= African American cinema =

Films made by, for, or about black Americans

African American cinema is loosely classified as films made by, for, or about Black Americans. Historically, African American films have been made with African-American casts and marketed to African-American audiences. The production team and director were sometimes also African American. More recently, Black films featuring multicultural casts aimed at multicultural audiences have also included American Blackness as an essential aspect of the storyline.

Three Film Pioneers

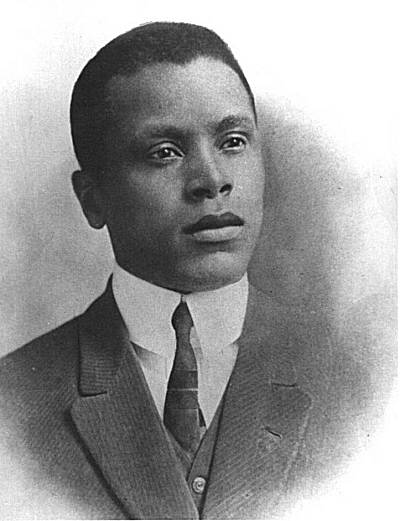
Oscar Micheaux is considered the first major African-American feature filmmaker. He made his first film in 1919 and (44 films later) his last in 1948.

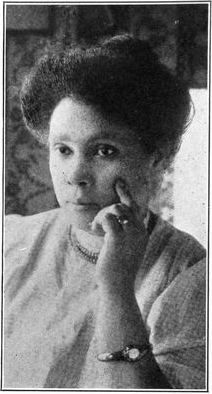
Maria P. Williams is considered the first Black woman film producer for the 5-reel silent drama based on her own screenplay for Flames of Wrath in 1923.

Lester Walton started writing film criticism in 1908 for the national mainstream Black newspaper New York Age. His reviews and insights remain foundational for subsequent Black film literature.

Segregation, discrimination, issues of representation, derogatory stereotypes and tired tropes have dogged Black American cinema from the start of a century-plus history that roughly coincided with the century-plus history of American cinema. From the very earliest days of moving pictures, major studios used Black actors to appeal to Black audiences while also often relegating them to bit parts, casting women as maids or nannies, and men as natives or servants or either gender as a "Magical Negro," an update on the "noble savage."

Black filmmakers, producers, critics and others have resisted narrow archetypes and offensive representation in many ways. As early as 1909, Lester A. Walton the arts critic for New York Age was making sophisticated arguments against the objectification of Black bodies onscreen, pointing out that "anti-Negro propaganda strikes at the very roots of the fundamental principles of democracy." Noting the educational impact film could have, he also argued that it could be used to "emancipate the white American from his peculiar ideas," which were "hurtful to both races."

The "race films" of 1915 to the mid-1950s followed a spirit of "racial uplift" and educational "counter-programing" with an eye to combating the racism of the Jim Crow south. That sensibility shifted markedly in the 1960s and '70s. Although Blaxploitation films continued to include stereotypical characters, they were also praised for portraying Black people as the heroes and subjects of their own stories.

By the 1980s, auteurs like Spike Lee and John Singleton created nuanced depictions of Black lives, which led the way for later filmmakers like Jordan Peele and Ava DuVernay to use a range of genres (horror, history, documentary, fantasy) to explore Black lives from multiple perspectives. Ryan Coogler's 2018 blockbuster superhero film Black Panther has also been widely praised for creating a fully realized Afrocentric urban utopia of Black people that includes a foundation myth and a legendary hero and takes "utter delight in its African-ness."

== History ==
Black cinema began in the silent era. Black producers made films, called race films, for segregated audiences. The short film Something Good – Negro Kiss was made in 1898. Early commercial films often depicted minstrel shows until vaudeville acts overtook them in popularity. An African American appeared in narrative film at least as early as 1909, which is also the year that Siegmund Lubin produced a comedy series, using a Black cast, with the derogatory title Sambo. Before then, film roles for Black actors were played by white actors in blackface. Sam Lucas became the first Black actor to be cast in a leading role in a mainstream film, appearing in the 1914 film Uncle Tom's Cabin. The Peter P. Jones Film Company was established in Chicago and filmed vaudeville acts as well as the 1915 National Half Century Exposition and Lincoln Jubilee.

William D. Foster's The Foster Photoplay Company in Chicago was one of the earliest studios to feature African Americans. Casts for its films included performers from stage shows at Robert T. Motts' Pekin Theatre. Theatre companies the Lafayette Players and the Ethiopian Art Theatre also had several players who crossed over into filmmaking. REOL Productions was a New York City studio that produced films in the early 1920s with actors from the Lafayette Players. During its relatively short existence, REOL produced a couple of documentaries, comedies, and a feature film.

Lincoln Motion Picture Company was established in Omaha, Nebraska before relocating to Los Angeles, and was among the very first Black producers of African-American films. Their mission statement was to "encourage black pride" with its "mostly family-oriented pictures." The short-lived white-owned Ebony Film Corporation was founded in 1915, but the white ownership's poor judgement about its stereotype-laden films aimed at both white and Black audiences led to a public outcry from Black audiences in the wake of divisive anger about The Birth of a Nation. The company shut its doors in 1919, as a result. Norman Studios, founded in 1920 in Jacksonville, Florida, produced drama films with African American casts, even though Norman, himself, was white. Between 1920 and 1928, however, he made a string of successful films, starring Black actors.

Biograph made a series of comedy shorts with comedian Bert Williams. Texas had several film companies that made films with black casts beginning in the 1920s.

=== Documentary shorts (1909–1913) ===
Some of the earliest African American films were later classified by scholars as "Uplift Cinema", referencing writer-educator Booker T. Washington's influential uplift movement, which took shape at Tuskegee Institute, an early Post Civil War teacher-training college in Alabama for newly freed slaves. Under his leadership, the college produced several documentary shorts, as a way to promote the institute and build support among the school's benefactors. Their first promotional documentary was 1909's A Trip to Tuskegee (1909) followed in 1913 by A Day at Tuskegee. That same year, Samuel Chapman Armstrong's Post Civil War Hampton Institute, which focused on "manual labor and self-help," took a page from Washington's book and created its own narrative documentary John Henry at Hampton: A Kind of Student Who Makes Good, specifically to appeal to Northern donors.

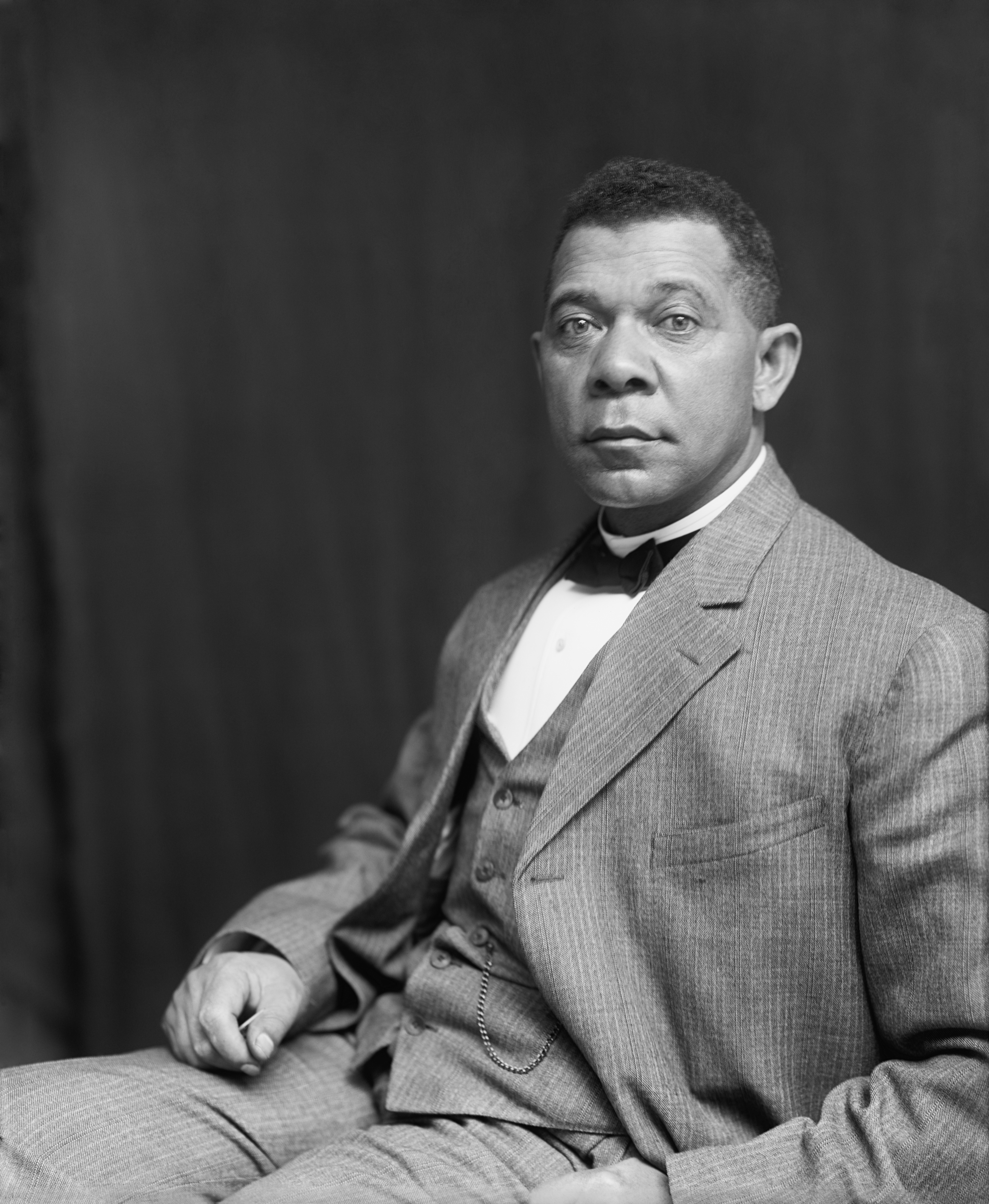
Booker T. Washington's uplift movement led to Uplift Cinema. Photographed by Frances Benjamin Johnston, c. 1895.

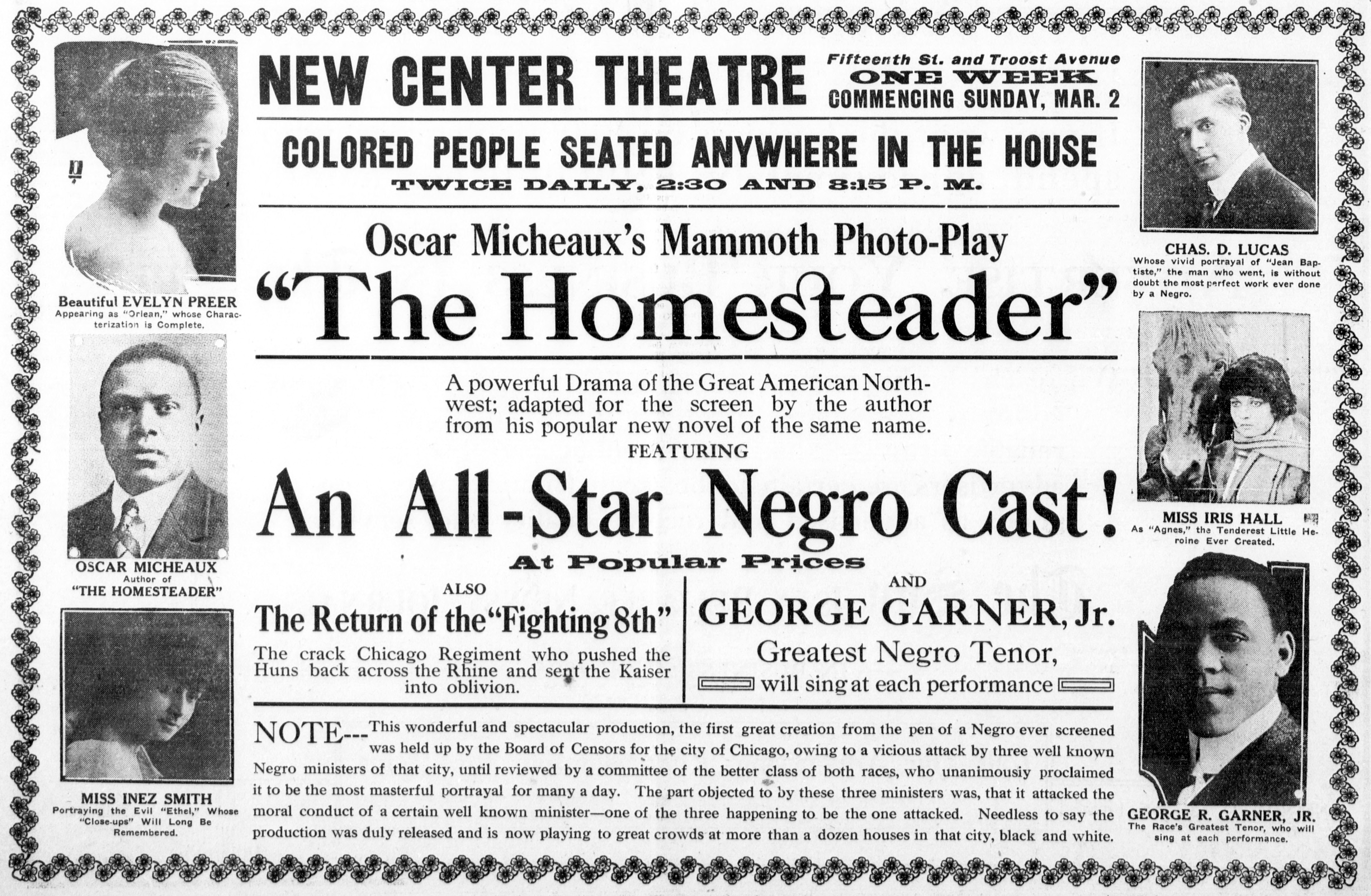
A newspaper ad for The Homesteader (1919) a lost black-and-white silent race film by filmmaker Oscar Micheaux.

=== Race film (1915–1950s) ===
Beginning in 1915, and continuing until the 1950s, African-American production companies partnered with independent film companies to create "race films," movies with African-American casts targeted at poor, and primarily Southern, African-American audiences by African-American producers working on much tighter budgets than their Hollywood rivals.

Race films typically emphasized self-improvement and middle-class values, while also "foster[ing] an entire generation of independent African American filmmakers and helped establish a 'Black cinema' in America, an artform and system where Black directors were empowered to be independent — raising money, shooting and editing, and scoring films themselves." Nearly 500 were made in the United States between 1915 and 1952, and most were shown in the southeastern United States where there were more theaters serving African Americans.

Early stars of the genre included future Oscar winner Hattie McDaniel and the actor, singer and political activist Paul Robeson, who would later be blacklisted during the McCarthy era. Novelist Oscar Micheaux adapted one of his novels for his first film The Homesteader, in 1919, which is credited as one of the earliest race films. Micheaux's second film Within Our Gates, released in 1920, was like all race films, a response to racism, and in this case the racism in D. W. Griffith's divisive 1915 film The Birth of a Nation. Micheaux would go on to write, produce and direct "forty-four feature-length films between 1919 and 1948," leading the Producers Guild of America to call him "The most prolific black — if not most prolific independent — filmmaker in American cinema."

=== Talkies and musicals (1920s–1940s) ===
Early filmmakers sometimes served in multiple roles as actor, director and producer. Spencer Williams, who later starred in Amos 'n' Andy, wrote and directed films. His Amegro Films produced the 1941 film The Blood of Jesus. Novelist-turned-filmmaker Oscar Micheaux worked first in silent film, and later became a prominent director and producer in talkies. William D. Alexander, known for his government-sponsored newsreels aimed at African American audiences early in his career, also became an influential African-American filmmaker.

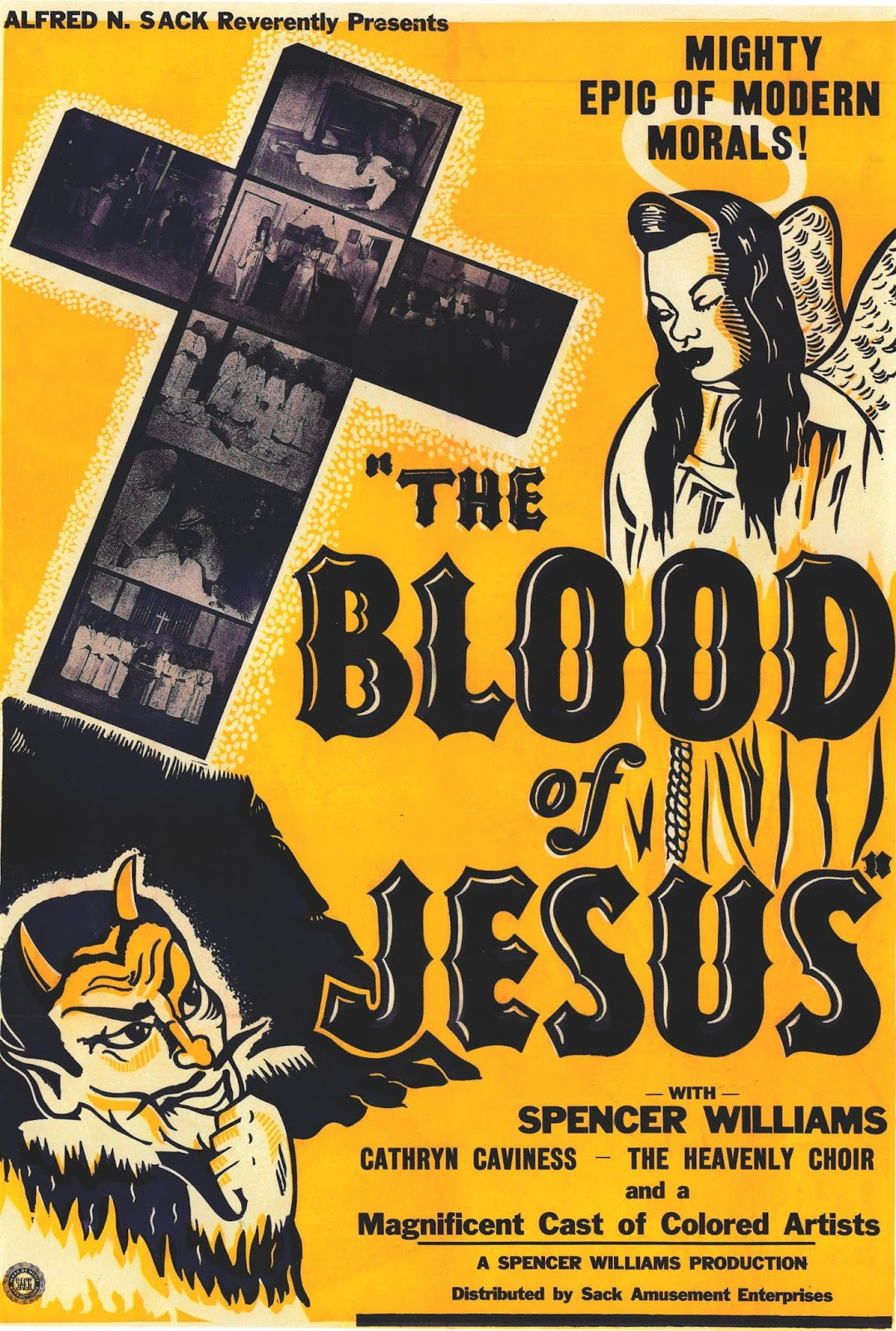
Poster advertising The Blood of Jesus, directed by Spencer Williams Jr., which Time magazine called one of the 25 most important race films, and was later added to the U.S. National Film Registry.

Major distributors included Toddy Pictures Corporation, which acquired and re-released earlier films under new titles and advertising campaigns and, briefly, Million Dollar Productions, which featured a partnership with African American star Ralph Cooper.

Musical films captured various African-American acts and performers on film. Known as soundies, they were a precursor to music videos, which were often cut from them and then released between the years 1940 and 1946. They featured an enormous range of musical styles and "cheesecake" performances, as well as musicians both white and Black, including singer, dancer and actress Dorothy Dandridge, who would later become the first Black Oscar nominee for Best Actress. Comic actor Stepin Fetchit, who was the first Black actor to earn a million dollars, and is controversial for his demeaning portrayal of Black subservience, also appeared in them. Jazz trumpeter Louis Armstrong, who went on to make 20 feature films between the 1930s and 1960s, made soundies too.

Other Black actors famous for their song-and-dance chops include tap dancer, singer and actor Bill "Bojangles" Robinson, who also performed in Shirley Temple films. Singer, dancer and actor Lena Horne, often recognized for her rendition of Stormy Weather in the 1943 musical of the same name, was also the first Black actress signed to a studio contract. Among the most prominent early actresses was Oscar winner Hattie McDaniel, who won Best Supporting Actress for her role in the 1939 film Gone with the Wind.

== Civil Rights era ==
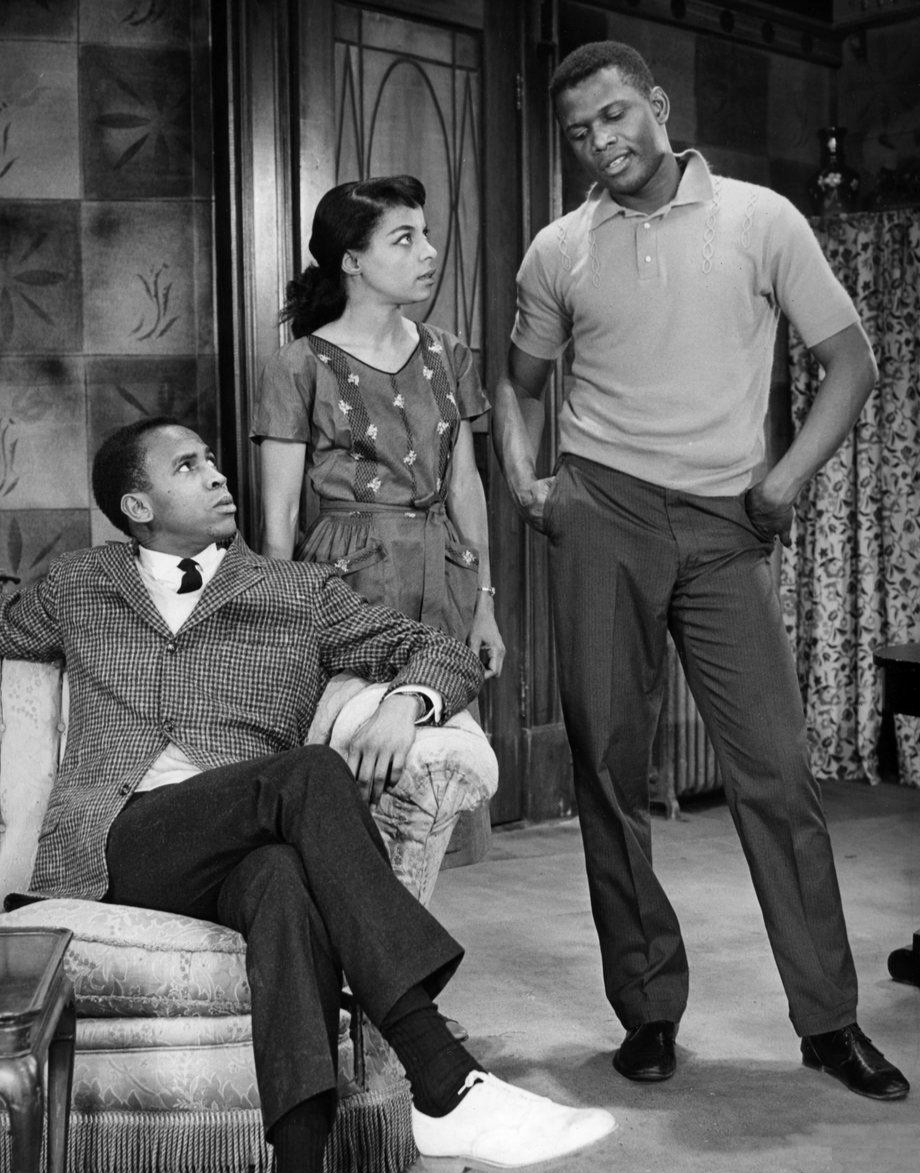
Movie star Sidney Poitier in A Raisin in the Sun, 1959

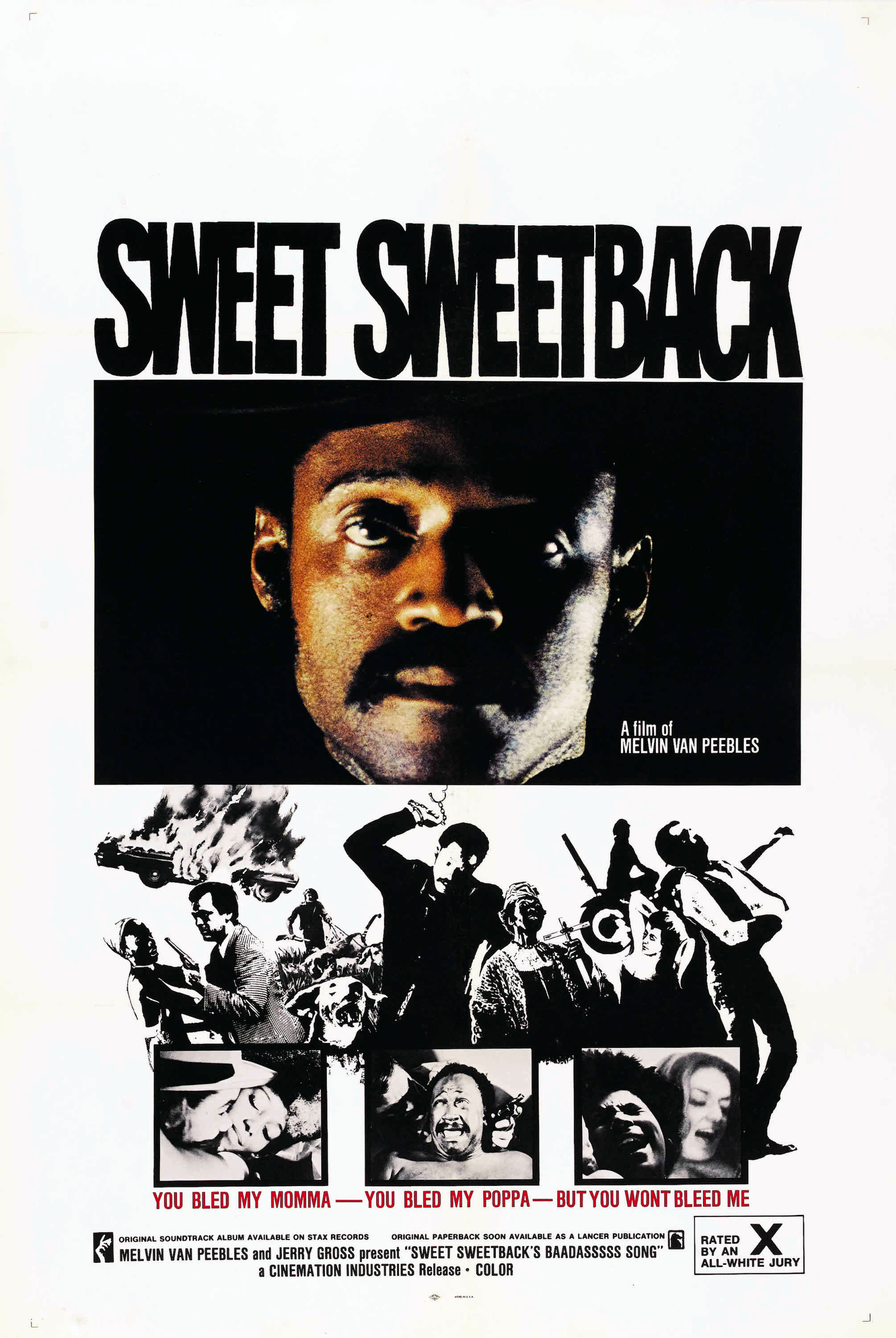
Poster for the independent film Sweet Sweetback's Baadasssss Song, 1971

=== Sidney Poitier films (1950s–1970s) ===
In the 1950s and 60s, Sidney Poitier became a movie star and the first Black male actor to win the Oscar in a competitive race for Lilies of the Field (1963), one of many acclaimed films in long filmography that includes an Oscar nod for The Defiant Ones (1958), which emphasized racial harmony as a means to an end, In the Heat of the Night (1967), a crime drama that focused on the uneasy partnership that develops between a bigoted white Southern police chief (played by Rod Steiger), in which Poitier famously slaps a racist plantation owner, and Guess Who's Coming to Dinner? (1967) a box office hit, co-starring Spencer Tracy and Katharine Hepburn as the liberal parents of Poitier's white fiancée, uneasy about their engagement. In the early 1970s, Poitier turned to directing, only to later return to the screen to portray Thurgood Marshall in Separate but Equal (1991) and Nelson Mandela in Mandela and de Klerk (1997). In 2009, Poitier was awarded the U.S. Presidential Medal of Freedom.

=== Blaxploitation (1971–1979) ===
Blaxploitation films are a subset of exploitation films, a term derived from the film marketing term emphasizing the promotion of a brand-name star, a trending topic or titilliating subject matter — in short, a nearly surefire draw at the box office. Both exploitation and blaxploitation films are low-budget B-movies, designed to turn a profit.

The 1970s Black variant sought to tell Black stories with Black actors to Black audiences, but they were usually not produced by African Americans. As Junius Griffin, the president of the Hollywood branch of the NAACP, wrote in a New York Times op-ed in 1972: "At present, Black movies are a 'rip off' enriching major white film producers and a very few black people."

Directors in the Civil Rights Era

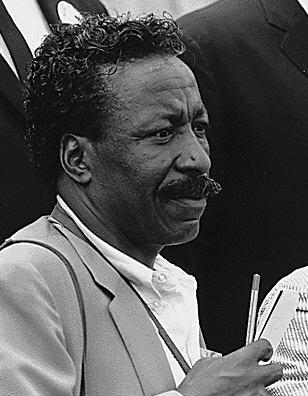
Film director Gordon Parks in 1963

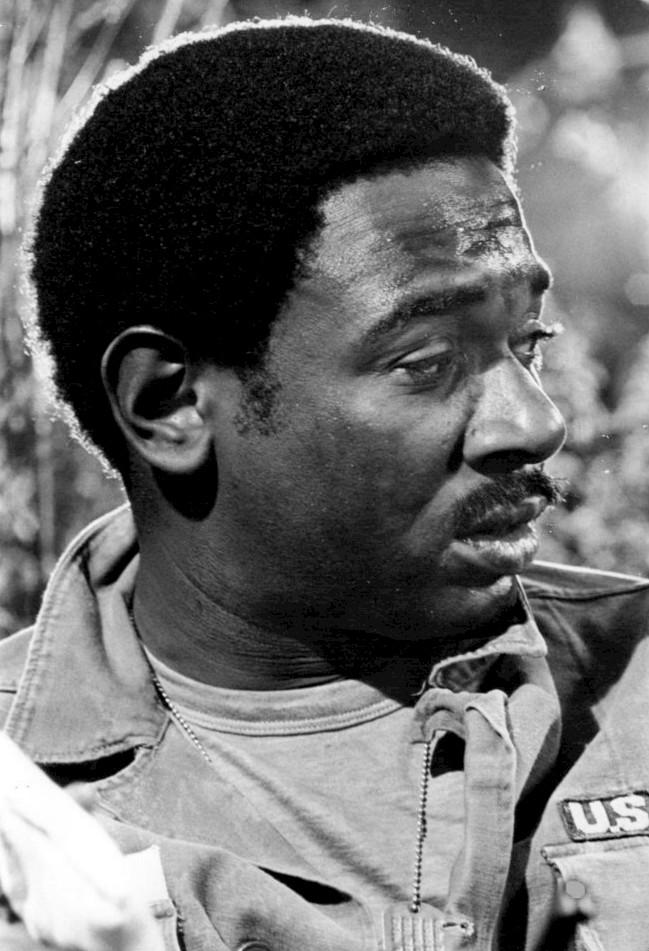
Director Ivan Dixon in 1967

Also considered exploitative because of the many stereotypes they relied on, Blaxploitation films typically took place in stereotypically urban environments, African-American characters were frequently charged with overcoming "The Man," which is to say white oppressors, and violence and sex often featured prominently. Despite these tropes, Blaxploitation film was also recognized for portraying Black people as the heroes and subjects of their own stories, and for being the first genre of film to feature funk and soul music on their soundtracks.

Two films, both released in 1971, are said to have invented the genre: Melvin Van Peebles' Sweet Sweetback's Baadasssss Song, about a poor Black man fleeing the white police, and featuring a soundtrack by Earth, Wind & Fire was one. Director Gordon Parks' criminal action movie Shaft, featured a theme song that later won for the Academy Award for Best Original Song for the movie's theme song, which later appeared on multiple Top 100 lists, including AFI's 100 Years...100 Songs was the other.

Other notable films in the genre include Ivan Dixon's first feature film the 1972 thriller Trouble Man, which featured a soundtrack by Marvin Gaye; and Bill Gunn's 1973 experimental horror film Ganja & Hess, later remade by Spike Lee in 2014 as Da Sweet Blood of Jesus.

If Van Peebles and Parks' films made the genre's quintessential films, then Pam Grier was the genre's quintessential actress. Later described by director Quentin Tarantino as cinema's first female action star, Grier was "part of a small group of women who defined the genre", going from bit parts in films such as the satirical melodrama Beyond the Valley of the Dolls to featured roles in movies such as 1973's horror film Scream Blacula Scream and 1973's Coffy, in which she played a vengeful nurse.

=== L.A. Rebellion (1960s–1980s) ===
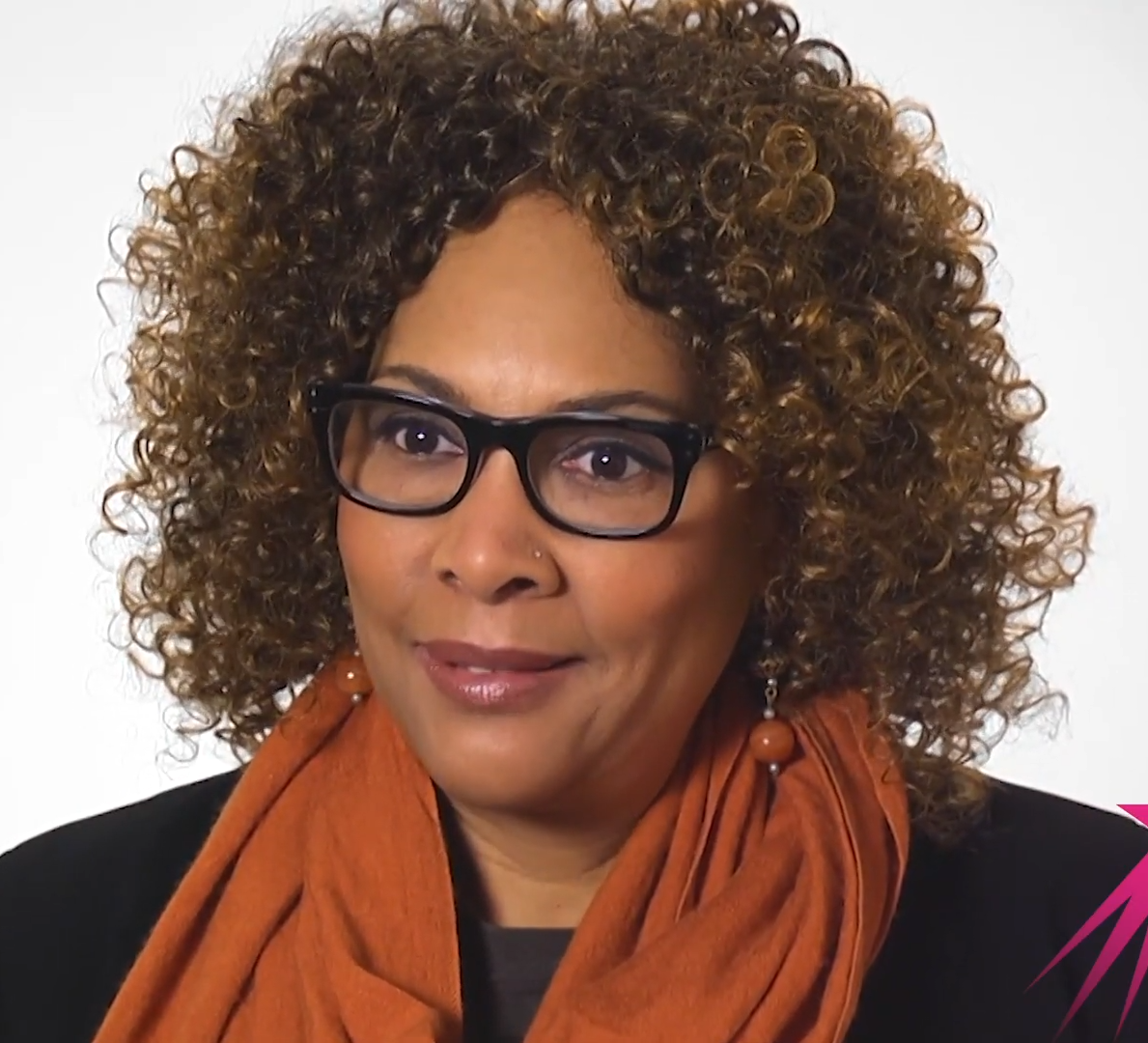
Film director Julie Dash in 2020

The L.A. Rebellion film movement, also known as the "Los Angeles School of Black Filmmakers", or the UCLA Rebellion, refers to several dozen young African and African-American filmmakers who studied at UCLA Film School for the 20-year span between the late 1960s to the late 1980s, who went on to create independent Black art house film to provides an alternative to classical Hollywood cinema.

Typically featuring working-class protagonists from communities in need, films such as Charles Burnett's 1978 feature Killer of Sheep have been hailed as a landmark, though until recently many have been hard to find. Julie Dash's 1991 Daughters of the Dust, on the other hand, was the first full-length feature directed by a Black woman that was distributed nation-wide.

Both films are informed by the greater context of the L.A. Rebellion's early days: Adamantly anti-Hollywood, and committed to storytelling based on authentic experience, the L.A. Rebellion was formed soon after the 1965 Watts riots, unrest after a 1969 shoot-out on the UCLA campus, anti-Vietnam and Black Power movement struggles, which led several students to persuade the university to "launch an ethnographic studies programme responsive to local communities of colour.... The films that followed ... were forged in solidarity with anti-colonial movements from around the world, such as Brazil's Cinema Novo and the Argentinian Grupo Cine Liberación."

Although most films like Burnett's were never widely seen, a resurgence of interest in the radical filmmaking movement led to a 2011 retrospective at the UCLA Hammer Museum, a 2015 retrospective at the Tate Modern, and a 2015 book published by UCLA called L.A. Rebellion: Creating a New Black Cinema.

== Contemporary ==
=== Cult classics (1980s) ===
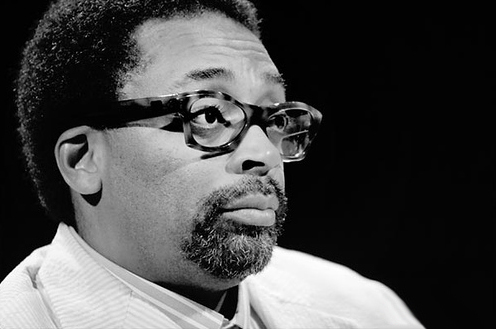
Director Spike Lee in 2007

In between the music and the drama, 1980s film was frequently comic, launching Eddie Murphy's blockbuster film career. In 1987, actor, comedian, and director Robert Townsend's 1987 film Hollywood Shuffle, satirized the Hollywood film industry and its treatment of African Americans and created a buzz. In 1982, Eddie Murphy made the buddy comedy 48 Hrs, which The New York Times called "positively witty". In 1983, he made another hit in Trading Places with Dan Aykroyd.

In 1984, already a proven box-office draw, Murphy left Saturday Night Live, and launched a successful full-time career, with his first solo leading role in Beverly Hills Cop, which went on to have two sequels. In 1988, he made the silly romantic comedy Coming to America (which led to the less well-received sequel Coming 2 America in 2021), and in 1989 he made the comedy-drama crime film Harlem Nights, starring as part of a multi-generational comedy team that included legendary stand-ups Richard Pryor and Redd Foxx.

In 1984, Prince's rock musical drama Purple Rain, which featured an Oscar-winning soundtrack, as well as an album by the same name launched him as a superstar. In full-time filmmaking 1986 black-and-white comedy drama She's Gotta Have It launched Spike Lee into a three-decade plus career and counting. More than 20 years later, his first film was relaunched and reimagined as a two-season 2016 TV series by the same name. Lee ended the decade with 1989's Do the Right Thing, whose story exploring racial tension and simmering violence earned him both critical and commercial accolades, and may still be his most famous film.

=== Denzel Washington (1980s-2000s) ===
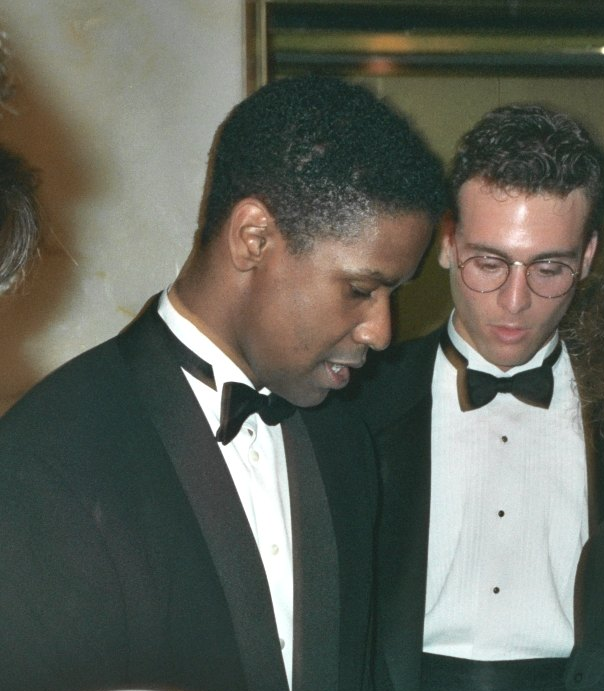
Matinee idol Denzel Washington in 1990

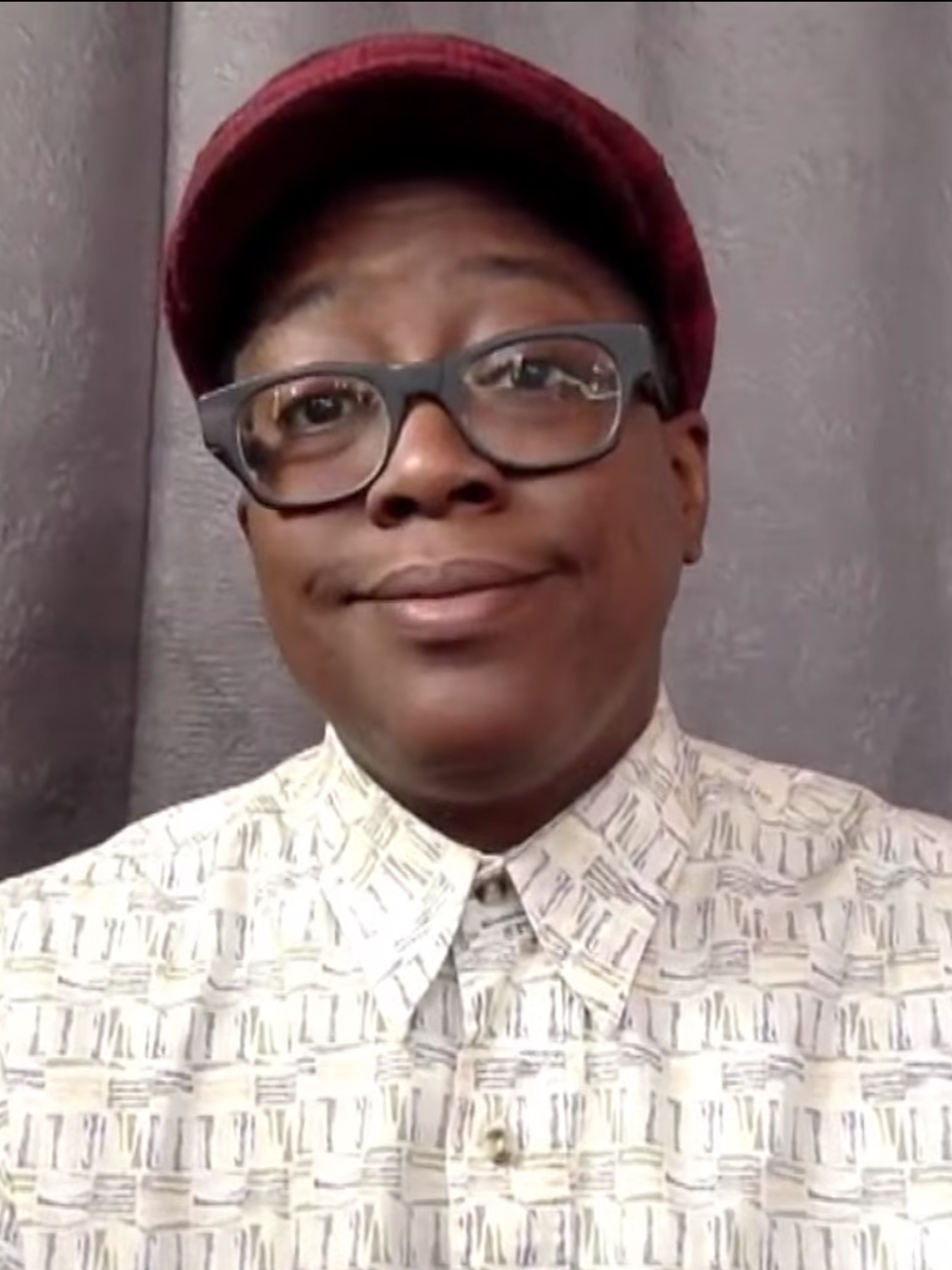
Director Cheryl Dunye in 2016

The late 1980s also marked the rise of actor Denzel Washington. He portrayed political activist Steve Biko in the 1987 film Cry Freedom, the title role in Spike Lee's 1992 Malcolm X and several other iconic figures. He won Best Supporting Actor for playing doomed Union Army soldier in the historical drama Glory (1989). Washington would go on to win 17 NAACP Image Awards, three Golden Globes, on Tony Award and a second Academy Award in 2001 for playing the corrupt detective in Antoine Fuqua's thriller Training Day.

In 2020, The New York Times ranked him as the greatest actor of the twenty-first century. In 2002, Washington made his directorial debut with the biographical film Antwone Fisher. His second directorial effort was The Great Debaters (2007). His third film, Fences (2016), in which he also starred, was nominated for the Academy Award for Best Picture.

=== Breakthrough years (1990s) ===
The Guardian newspaper's Steve Rose noted in 2016 that "The late 80s and 90s [also] heralded a breakthrough led by Spike Lee's Do the Right Thing and John Singleton's Boyz n the Hood." IndieWire calls the 1990s, in particular, "a period that witnessed a historic number of films made by African American directors who forever altered what we thought of as "black aesthetics" and who created touchstone works that continue to inspire contemporary filmmakers," crediting John Singleton's Boyz n the Hood (1991), which explores the challenges of ghetto life, Julie Dash's Daughters of the Dust about three generations of Gullah (1991), Kasi Lemmons' Eve's Bayou about the repercussions of a parent's affair and Cheryl Dunye's romantic dramedy Watermelon Woman (1996) as groundbreakers for their ambition and diversity of genre and style. Many also praise Spike Lee's Malcolm X (1992) as the biopic of the decade for its complexity and its frank politics, which began the film with a videotape of the brutal police beating of Rodney King, which sparked off the 1992 Los Angeles riots.

=== Auteurs and Oscars (2000s–present) ===
Spike Lee has built a body of work that predominantly uses Black casts, and tends to explore socio-political themes that range from women's sexual liberation in She's Gotta Have It (1986) to hate groups in the Oscar-winning Black Kkklansman (2018) more than 30 years later. Where Lee is squarely political, other contemporary filmmakers nowadays rely on political subtext hidden in plain sight. Jordan Peele's blockbuster horror film Get Out (2017) was also interpreted as a parable of Black dystopia, and Ryan Coogler's blockbuster Black Panther (2018) was interpreted as a model of Black utopia.

African-American women and African-American gay and lesbian women have also made advances directing films, in Radha Blank's comic The 40-Year-Old Version (2020), Ava DuVernay's fanciful rendition of the children's classic A Wrinkle in Time or Angela Robinson's short film D.E.B.S. (2003) turned feature-length adaptation in 2004.

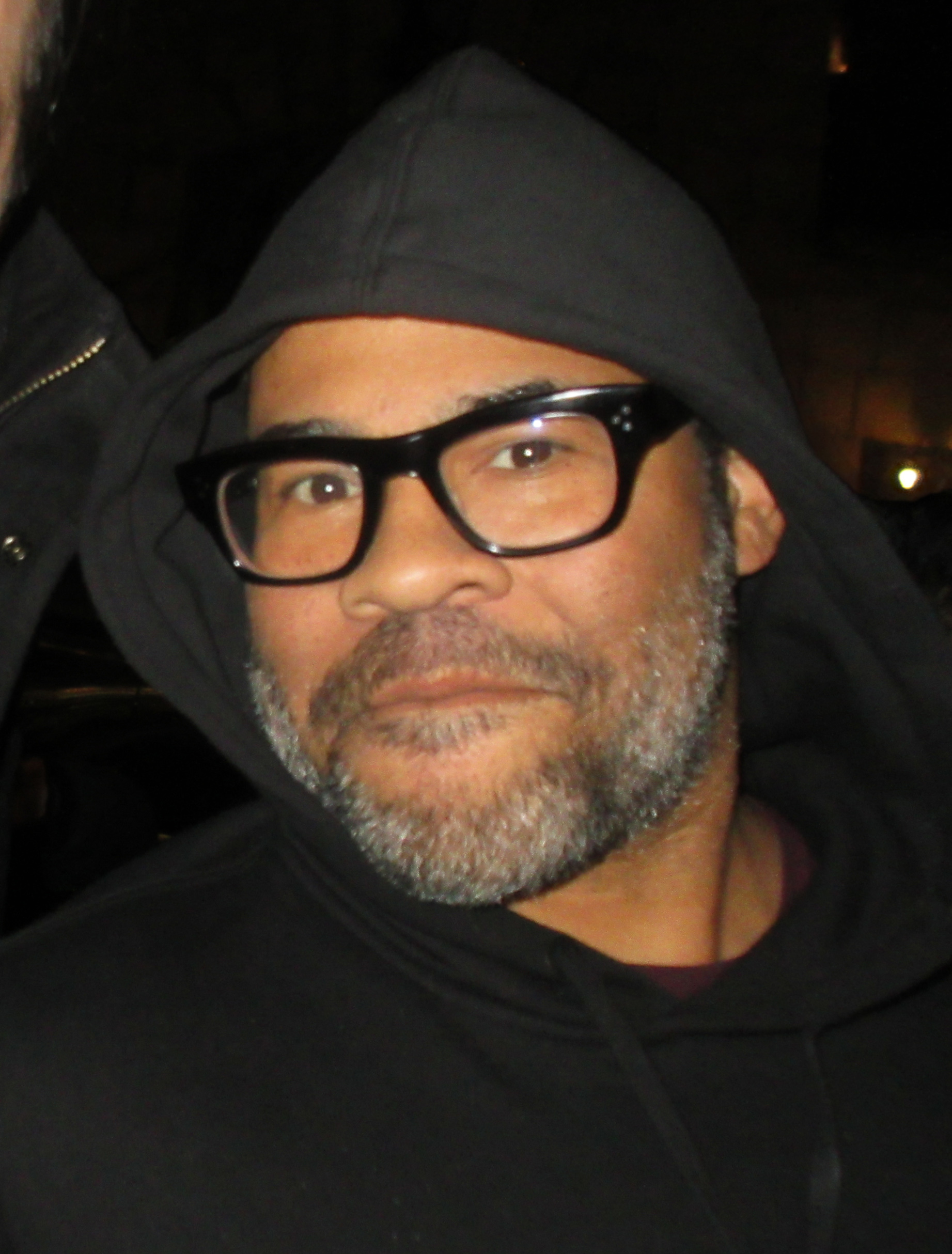
Director Jordan Peele in 2019

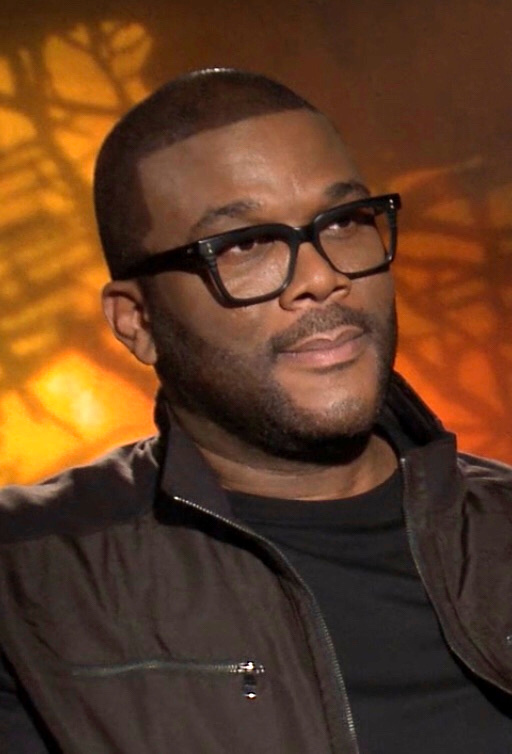
Director Tyler Perry in 2016

Director Tim Story is best known for comedies such as Barbershop (2002), the superhero film Fantastic Four (2005) and Ride Along, a buddy comedy franchise. He has been nominated for two NAACP Image Awards for Outstanding Directing in a Feature Film/Television Movie in 2006 and 2013.

=== Hollywood South ===
In the early 2000s, prolific Black filmmaker Tyler Perry began making movies. The films are often loathed by critics, and beloved by audiences. They mostly target Black audiences with slapstick farces that have earned him a loyal following and helped him build his Atlanta-based movie studio. Forbes describes Tyler Perry in a headline that says: "From 'Poor as Hell' to Billionaire: How Tyler Perry Changed Show Business Forever." "In 2007, the film industry spent $93 million on productions in Georgia. In 2016, it spent over $2 billion." He was awarded the Jean Hersholt Humanitarian Award at the 2021 Oscars ceremony, recognizing him as an "individual in the motion picture industry whose humanitarian efforts have brought credit to the industry," both for his personal generosity and his ingenuity, which extended to creating a "Camp Quarantine" to keep industry regulars employed during the Pandemic. More broadly, quantitative research has documented a substantial long-term increase in Black representation across contemporary Hollywood films. A 2026 study of 2,023 top domestic-grossing U.S. films released between 1980 and 2022 found that this increase was not uniform: Black actors' share of screentime was lower when credit conditions tightened and higher when GDP grew. Greater Black screentime was also associated with marginally higher domestic box-office revenue but lower international revenue share and worldwide gross.

== Controversies and criticism ==
Awards shows and membership in film associations have been criticized for largely excluding people of color, as have several recent films. Cultural critic Wesley Morris described The Help (2011) as "an owner's manual," noting that "[t]he best film roles three Black women will have all year require one of them to clean Ron Howard's daughter's house. Earlier films like The Green Mile (1999) and The Legend of Bagger Vance (2000), where a Black character's sole function was to help white people, were similarly criticized.

== Gallery of pioneers ==
(Selection was limited by availability.)

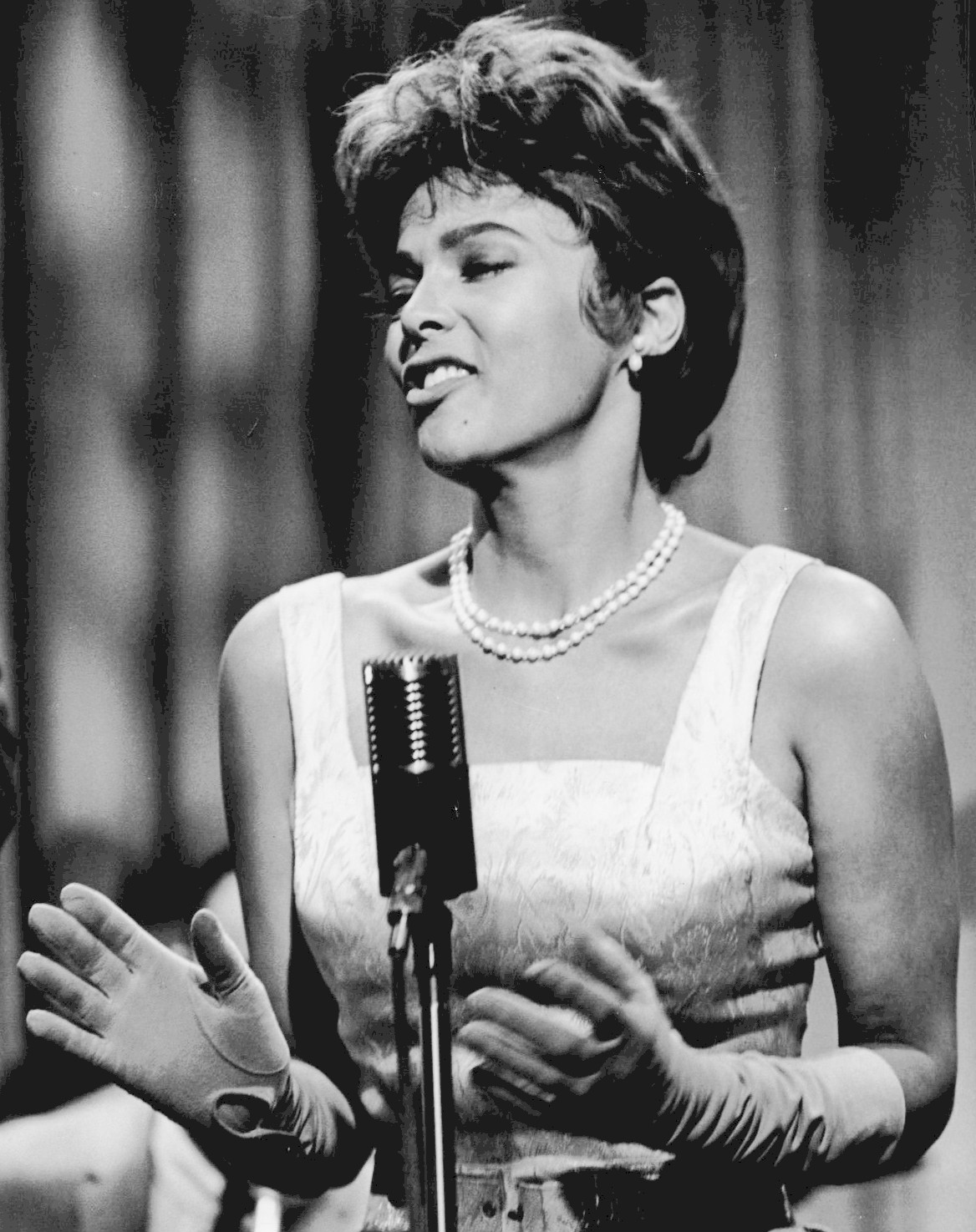
Dorothy Dandridge (1922–1965), pictured in 1962, is the first Black Best Actress Oscar nominee for her role in 1954's Carmen Jones with Harry Belafonte.

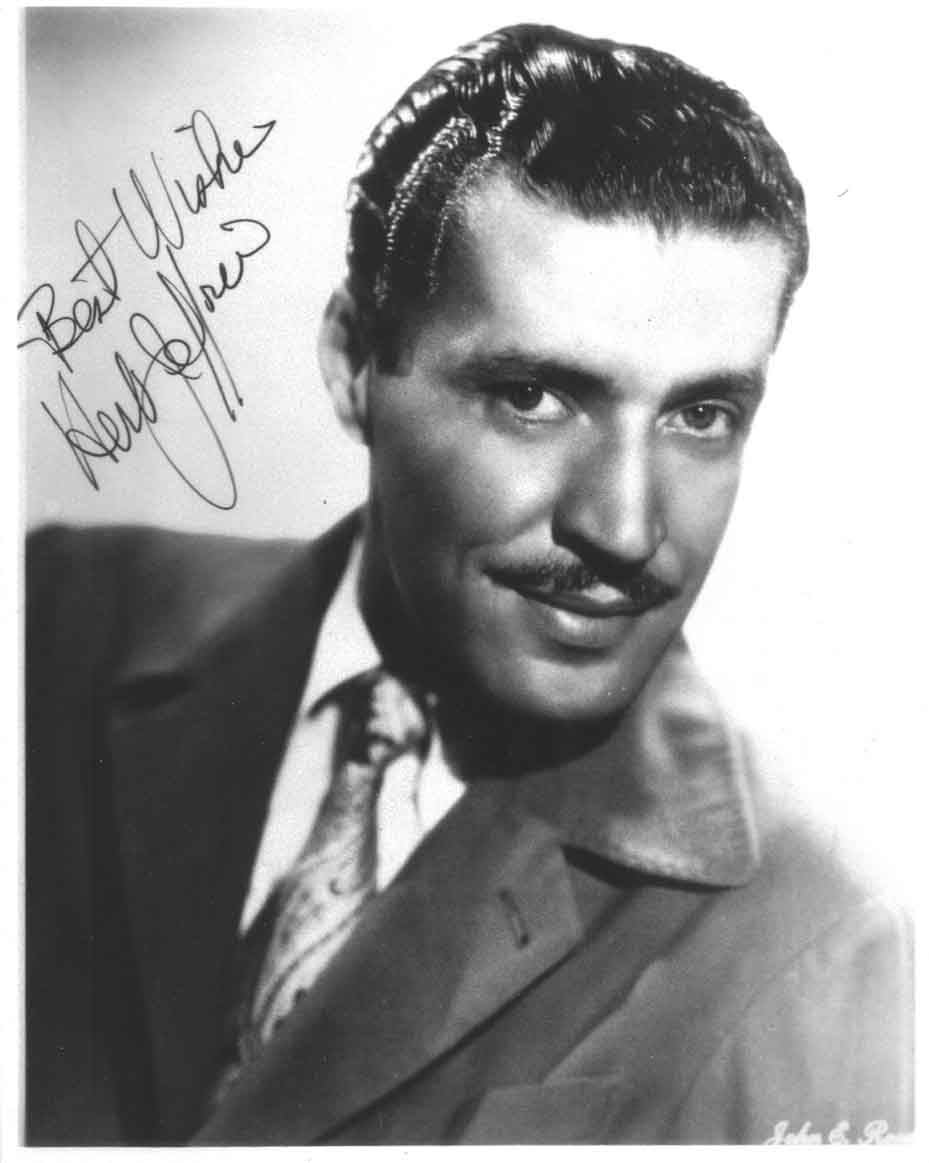
Herb Jeffries (1913–2014), pictured in 1944, debuted in 1937's Harlem on the Prairie, as the first Black singing cowboy in the first Black Western talkie with an all-Black cast.

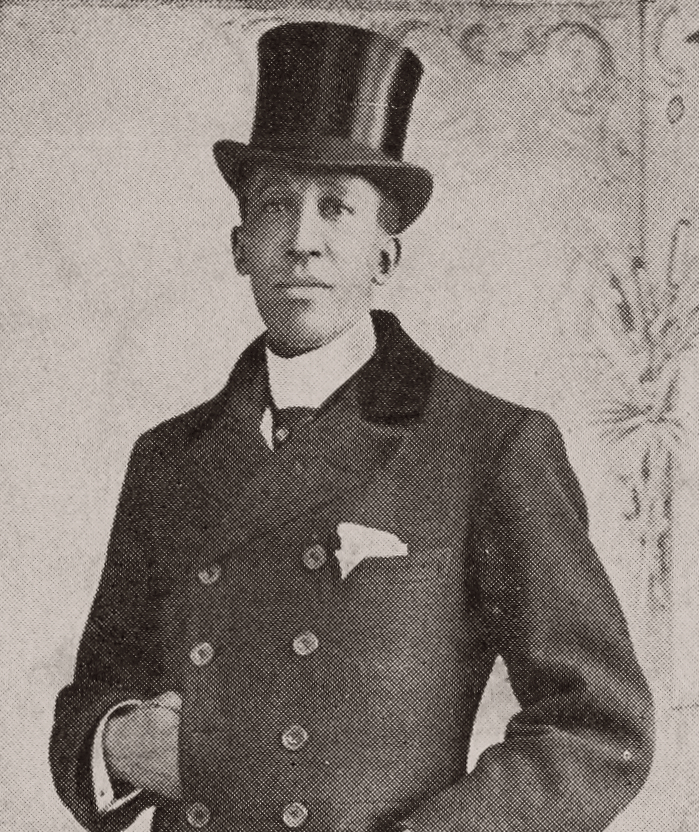
Sam Lucas (1848–1916), pictured in 1902, was the first Black man to portray the role of Uncle Tom on stage and screen.

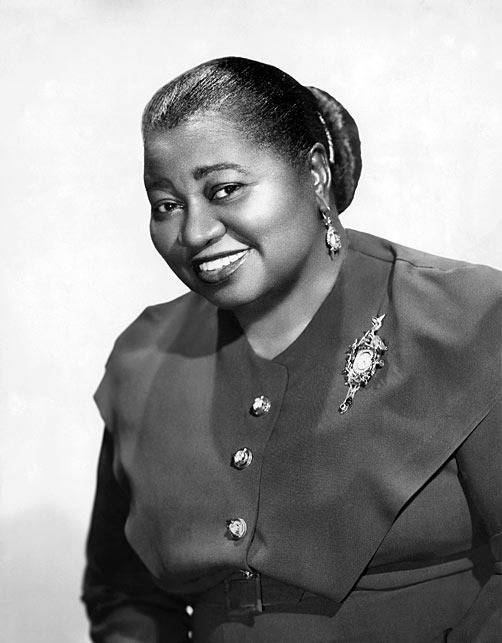
Hattie McDaniel (1893–1952), pictured in 1939, was the first Black individual and the first woman to win the Oscar for her role in Gone with the Wind.

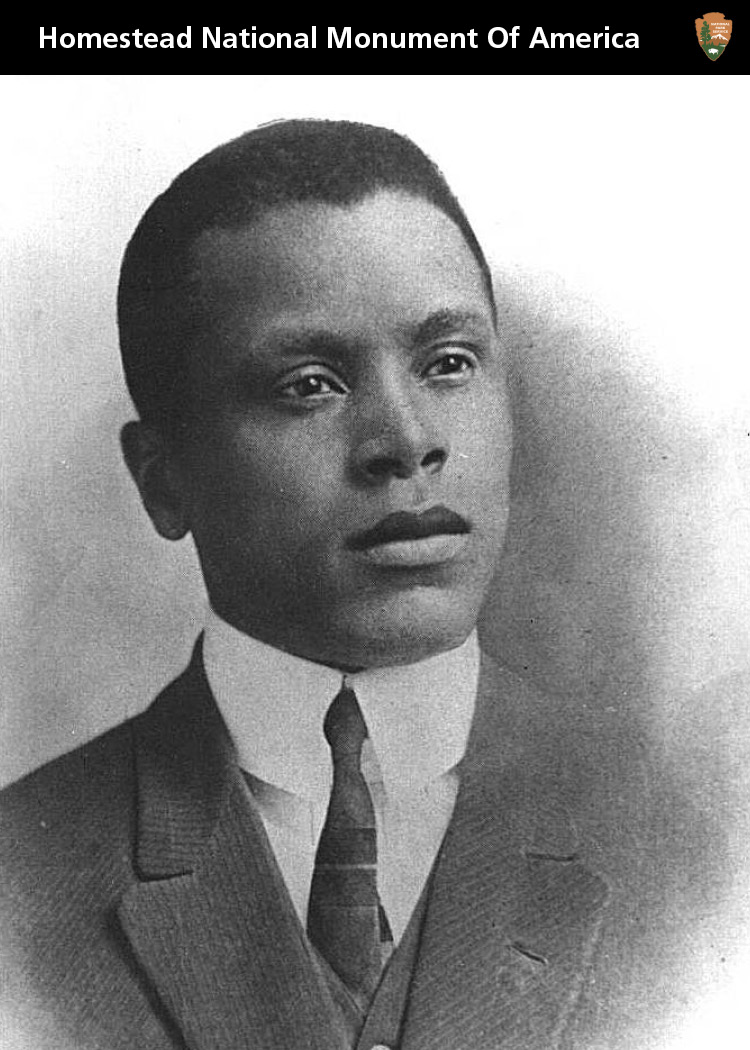
Oscar Micheaux (1884–1951) was both writer, director and the first major Black filmmaker who made more than 40 films, including adaptations from his own novels.

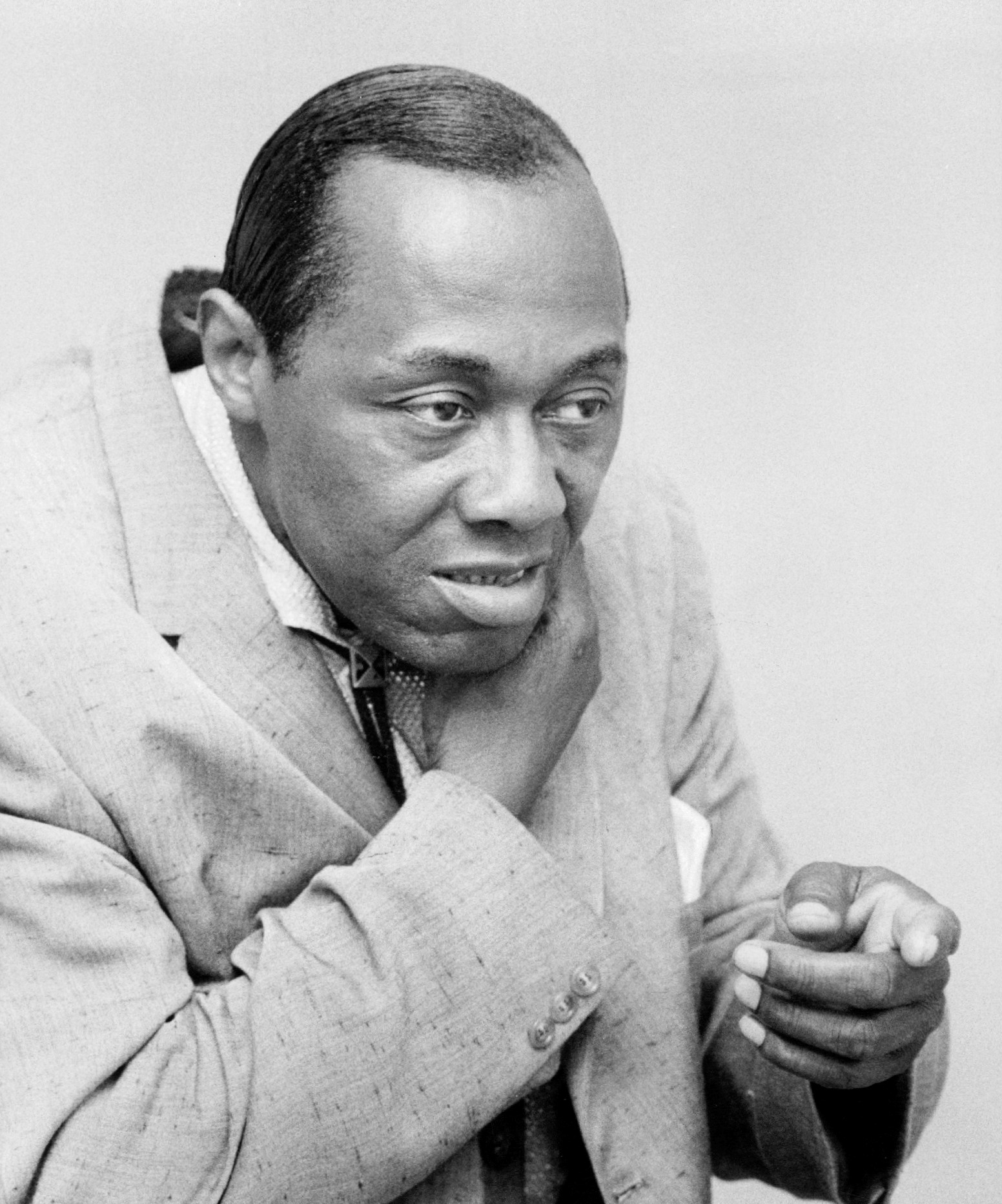
Stepin Fetchit, né Lincoln Perry (1902–1985), pictured in 1959, both criticized as a stereotype and praised as an archetype, was the first Black actor to earn $1 million.

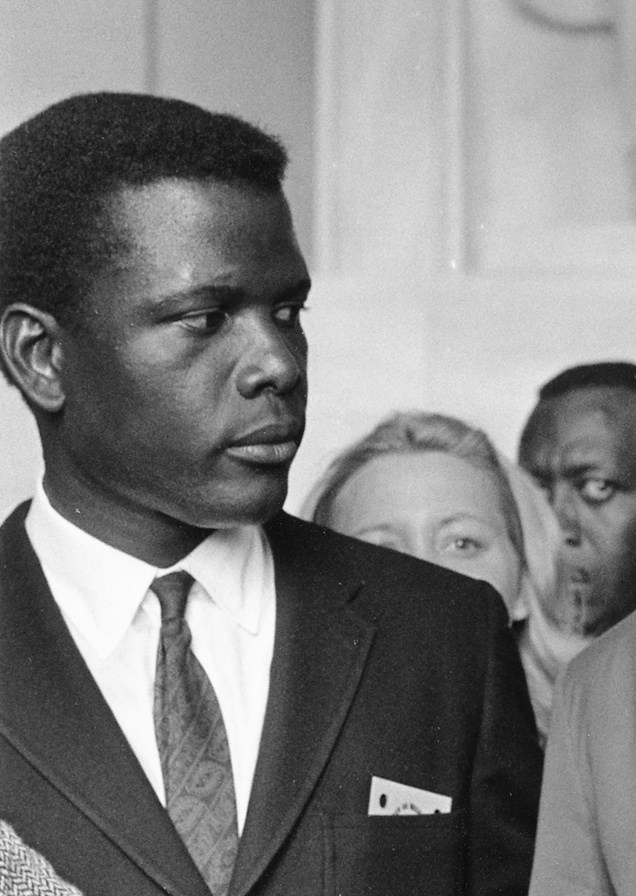
Sidney Poitier (1927–2022), pictured in 1963, was the first Black movie star and the first Black male winner of the Academy Award for Best Actor in 1964.

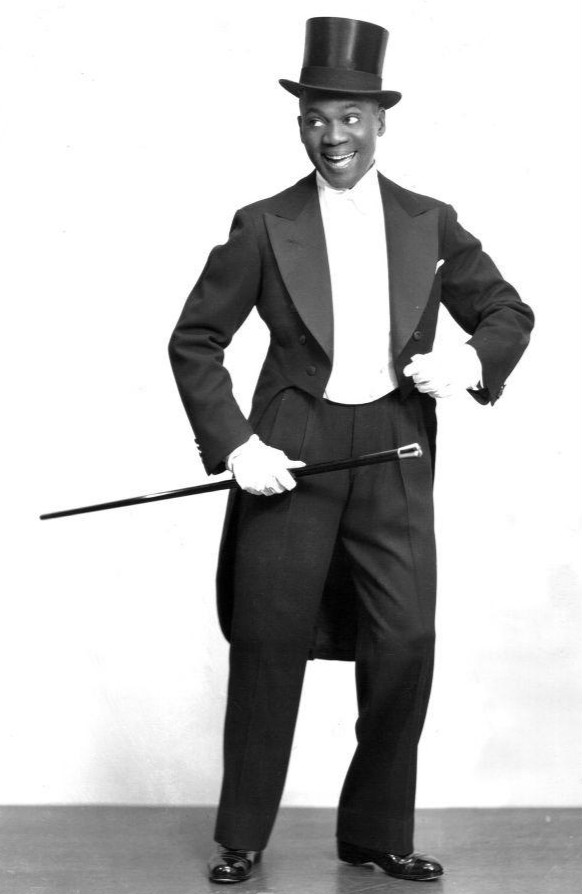
Bill "Bojangles" Robinson (1878–1949), pictured in 1946, was an American tap dancer, actor, singer, perhaps best known today for his Shirley Temple films. For the first half of the 20th century, however, he was the most highly paid Black American entertainer in America.

Lester Walton (1882–1965) was a journalist, sportswriter, civil rights activist, diplomat, composer and theater owner But it's his writing on Black representation in film that made him one of African America's earliest and most influential critics.

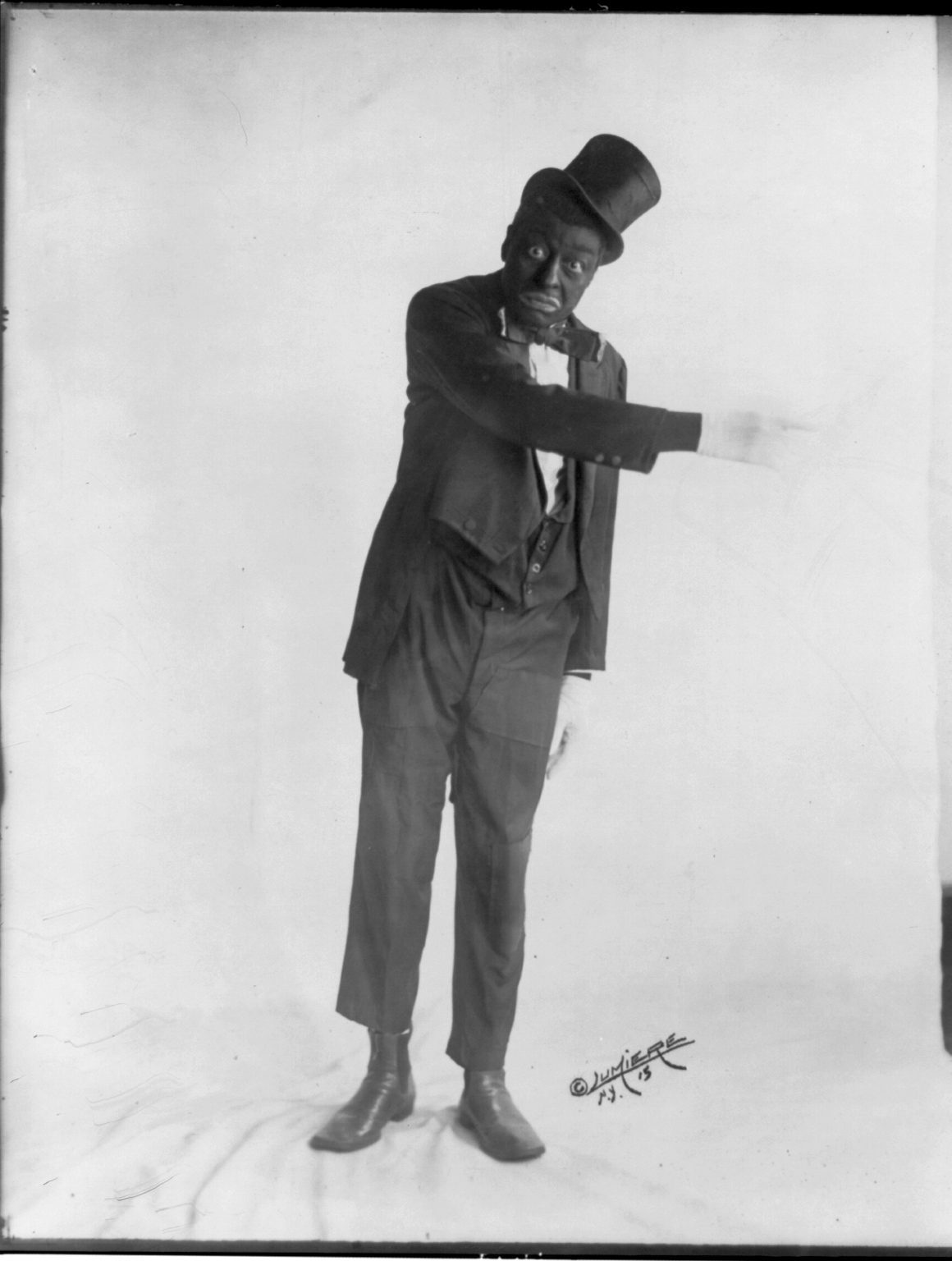
Bert Williams (1874–1922), pictured in 1922, the comedian, one of the most popular of his era, is credited as the first Black man to have the leading role in a film, in this case, Darktown Jubilee in 1914.

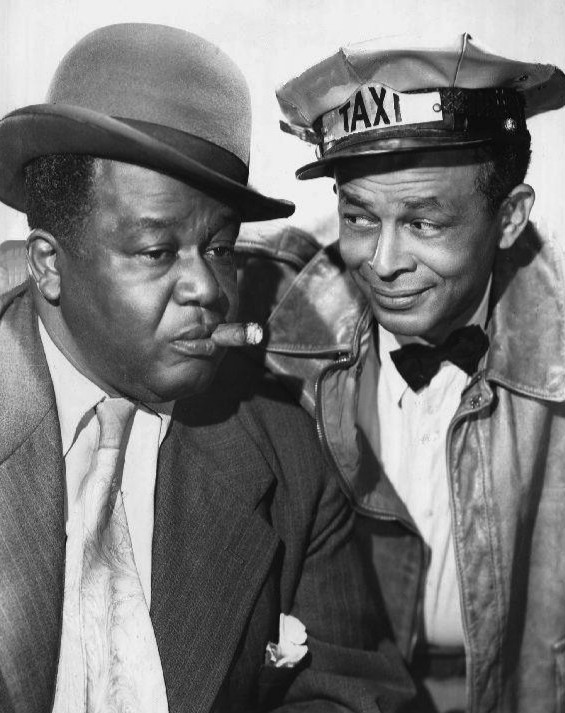
Spencer Williams (1893–1969) was a groundbreaking actor-director-filmmaker. He portrayed Andy on the Amos 'n' Andy TV show (Alvin Childress is pictured with him above in 1952). He also directed the 1941 race film The Blood of Jesus.

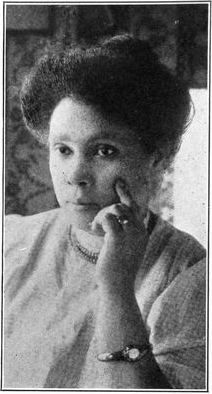
Maria P. Williams (1866–1932) was a teacher, reporter, actor and screenwriter, but she is also credited as the first Black woman film producer for the five-reel silent crime drama based on her own screenplay, Flames of Wrath in 1923.

== Gallery of Oscar winners ==
(Selection was limited by availability.)

Actors

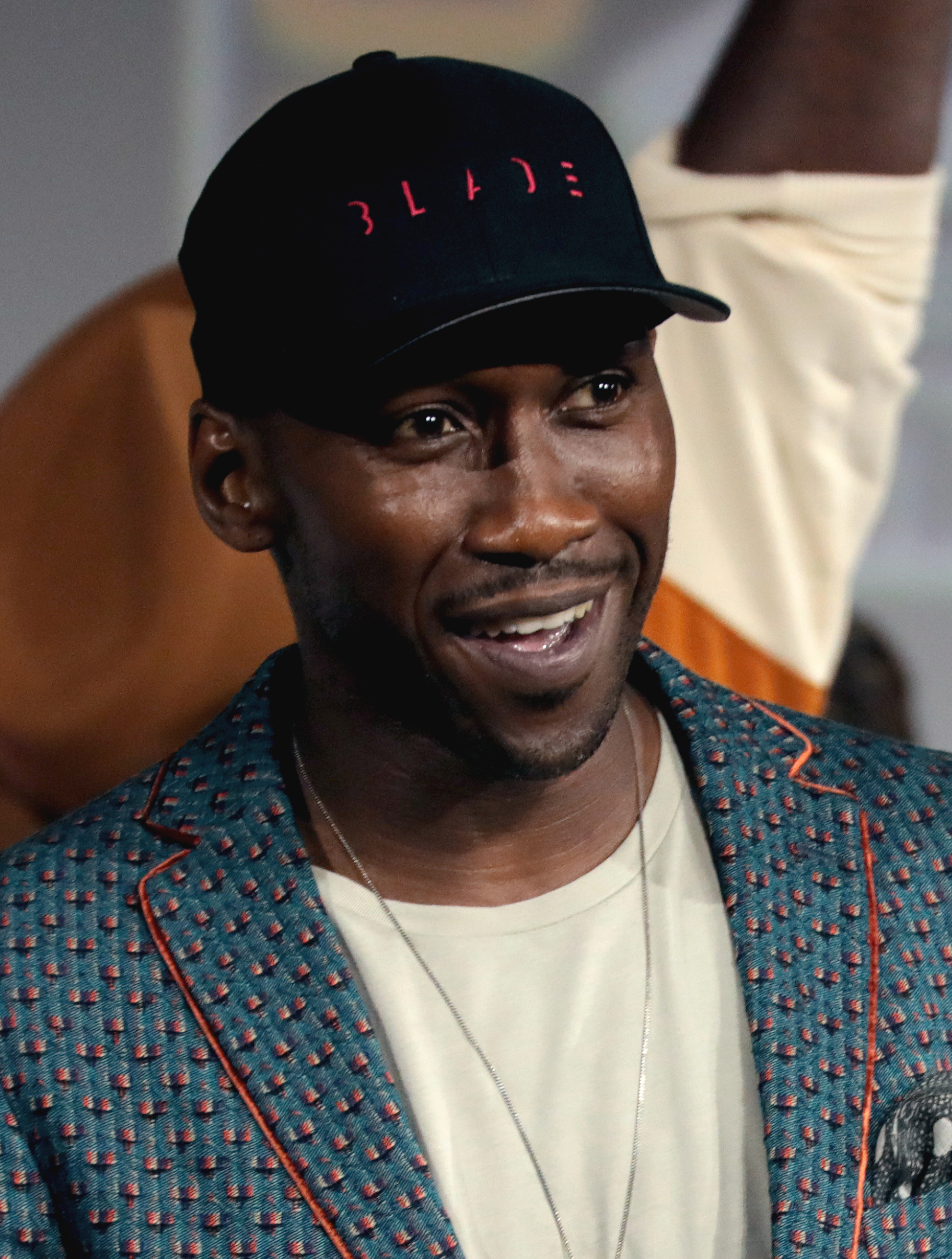
Actor and two time Academy Award winner Mahershala Ali in 2019

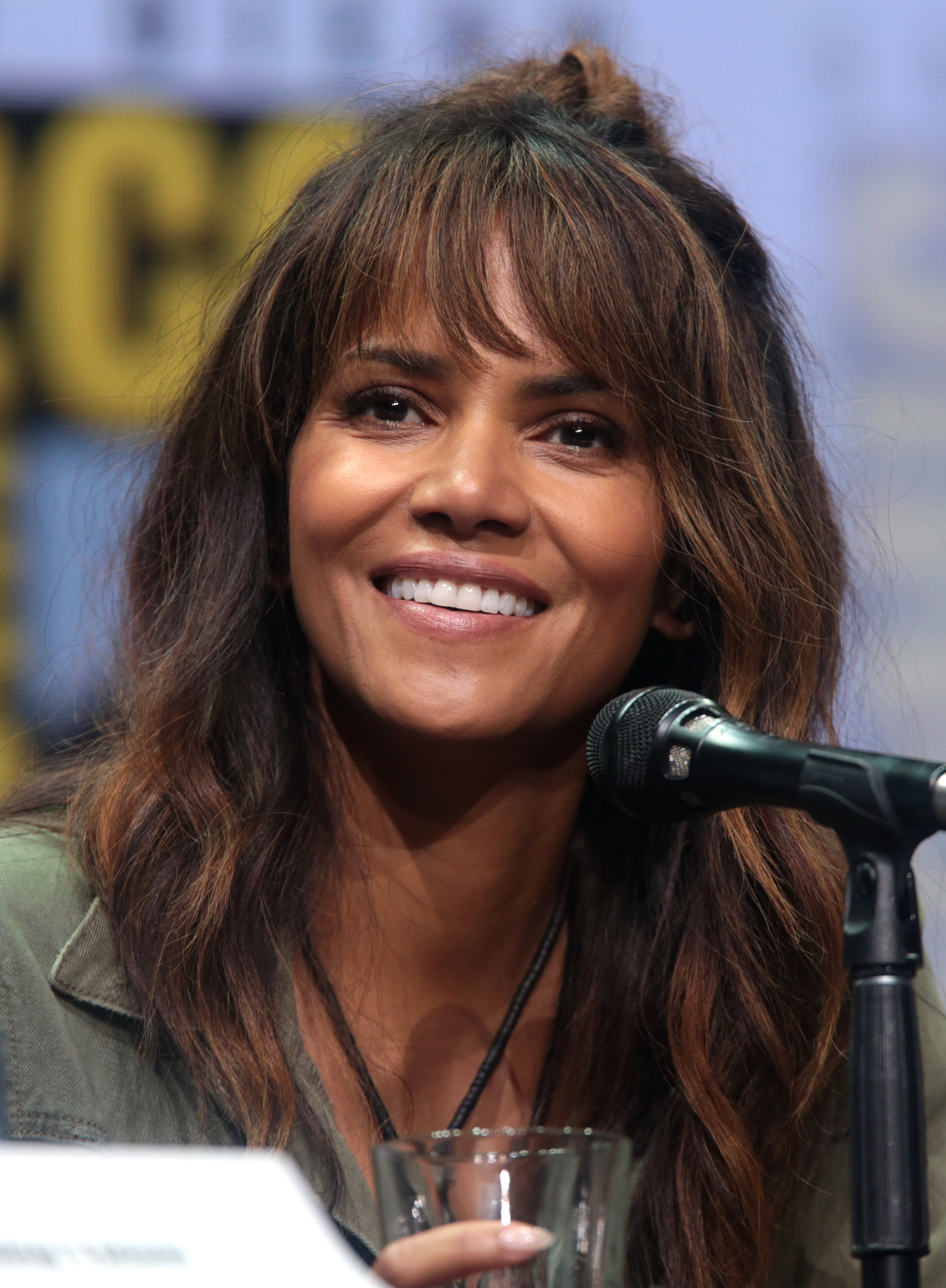
Actress and Academy Award winner Halle Berry in 2017

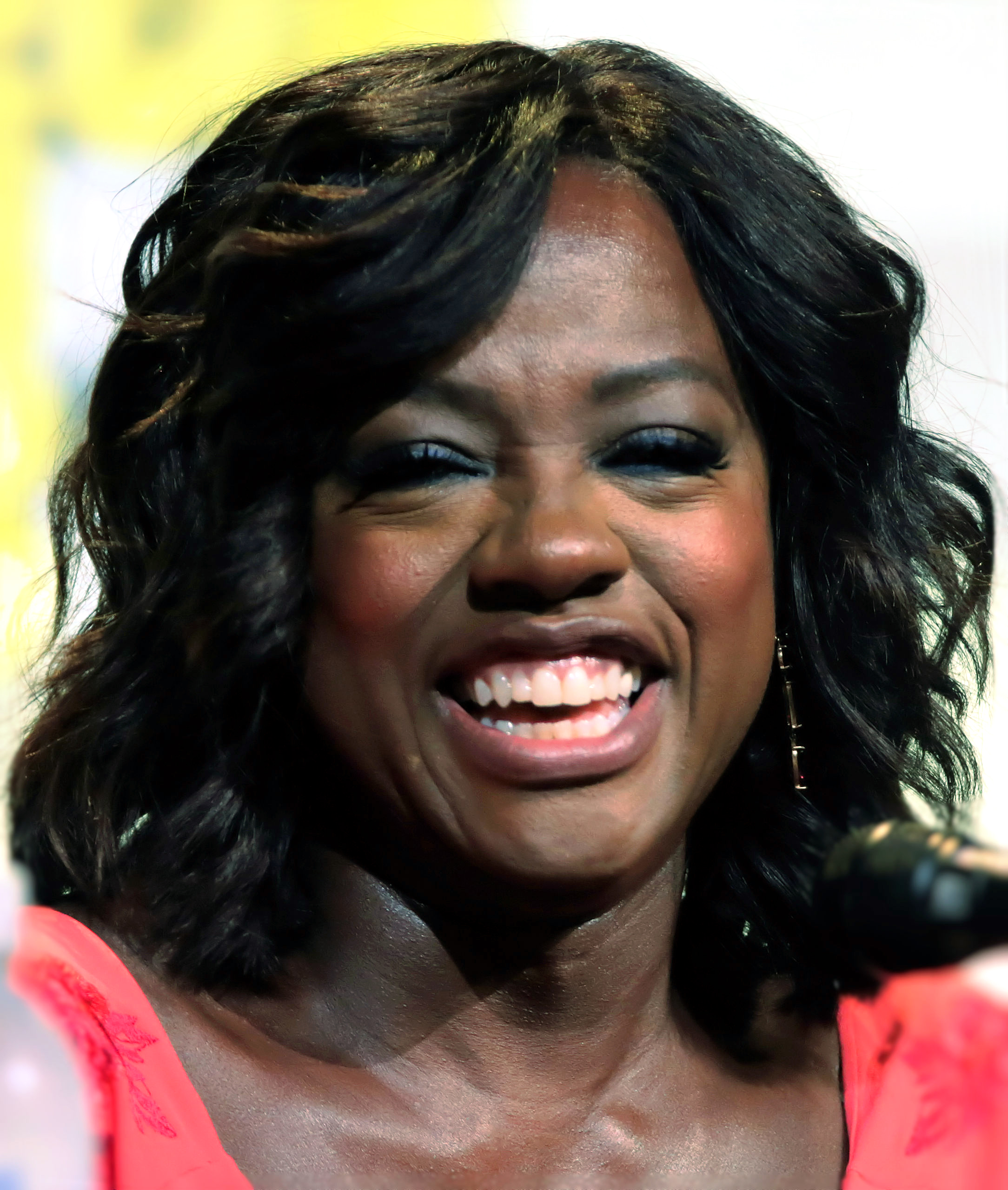
Viola Davis is the most nominated Black actress in Oscar history and won in 2016.

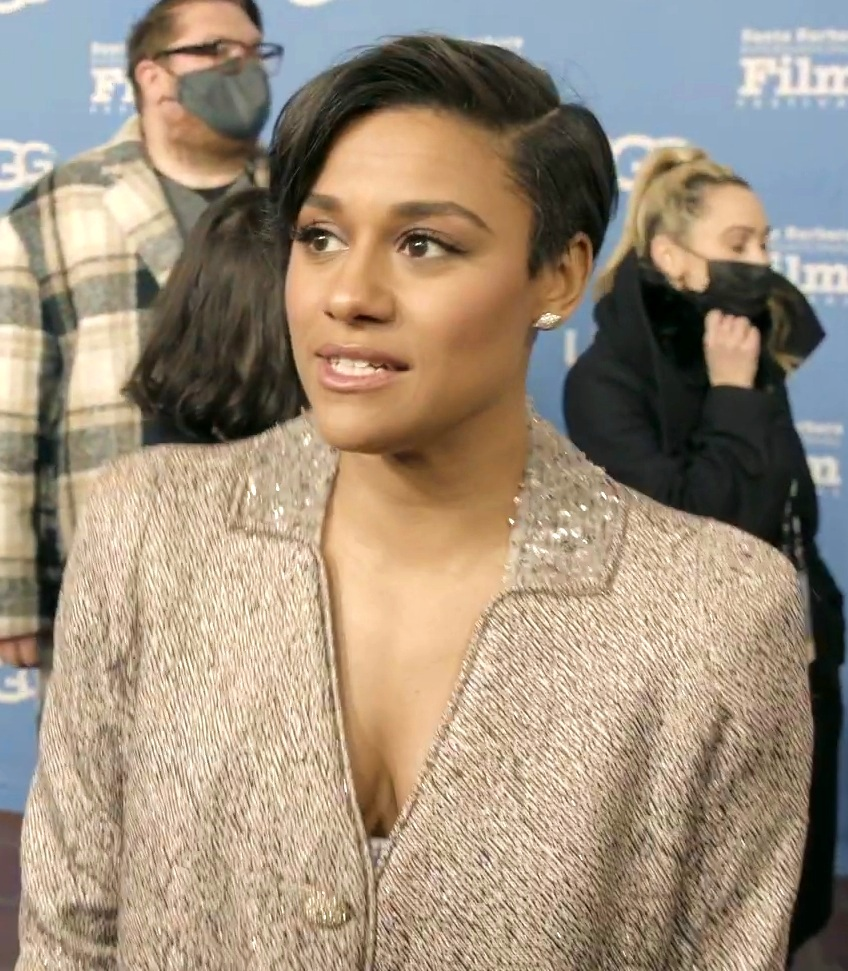
Actress and Academy Award winner Ariana DeBose in 2022

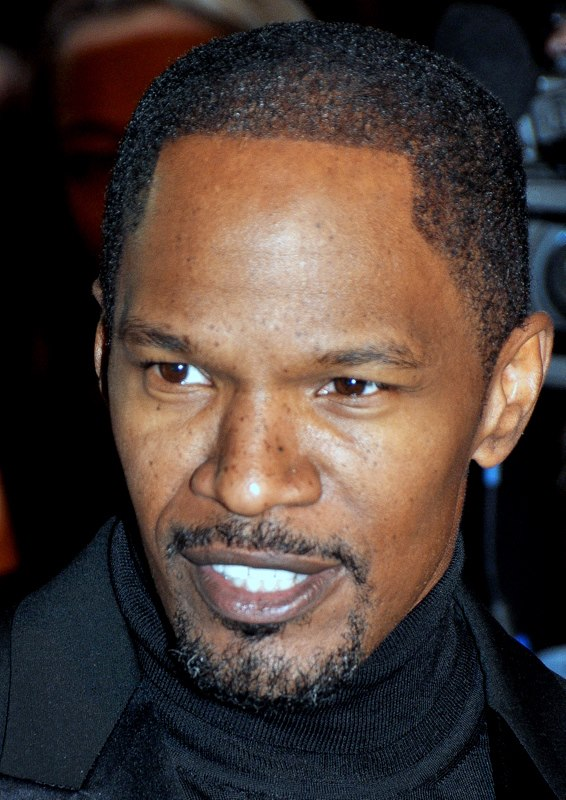
Actor, comedian and Academy Award winner Jamie Foxx in 2013

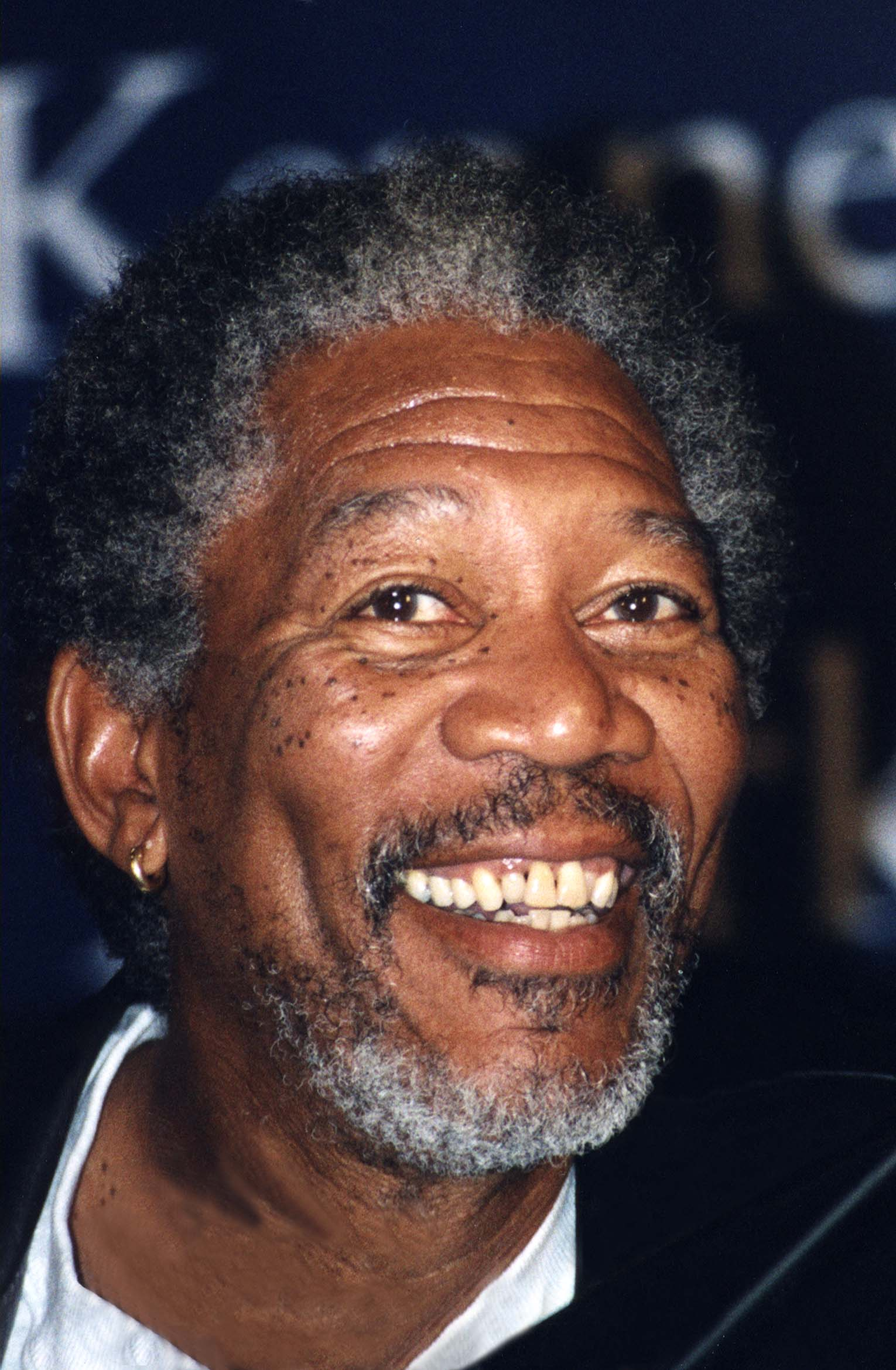
Actor and Academy Award winner Morgan Freeman in 1998

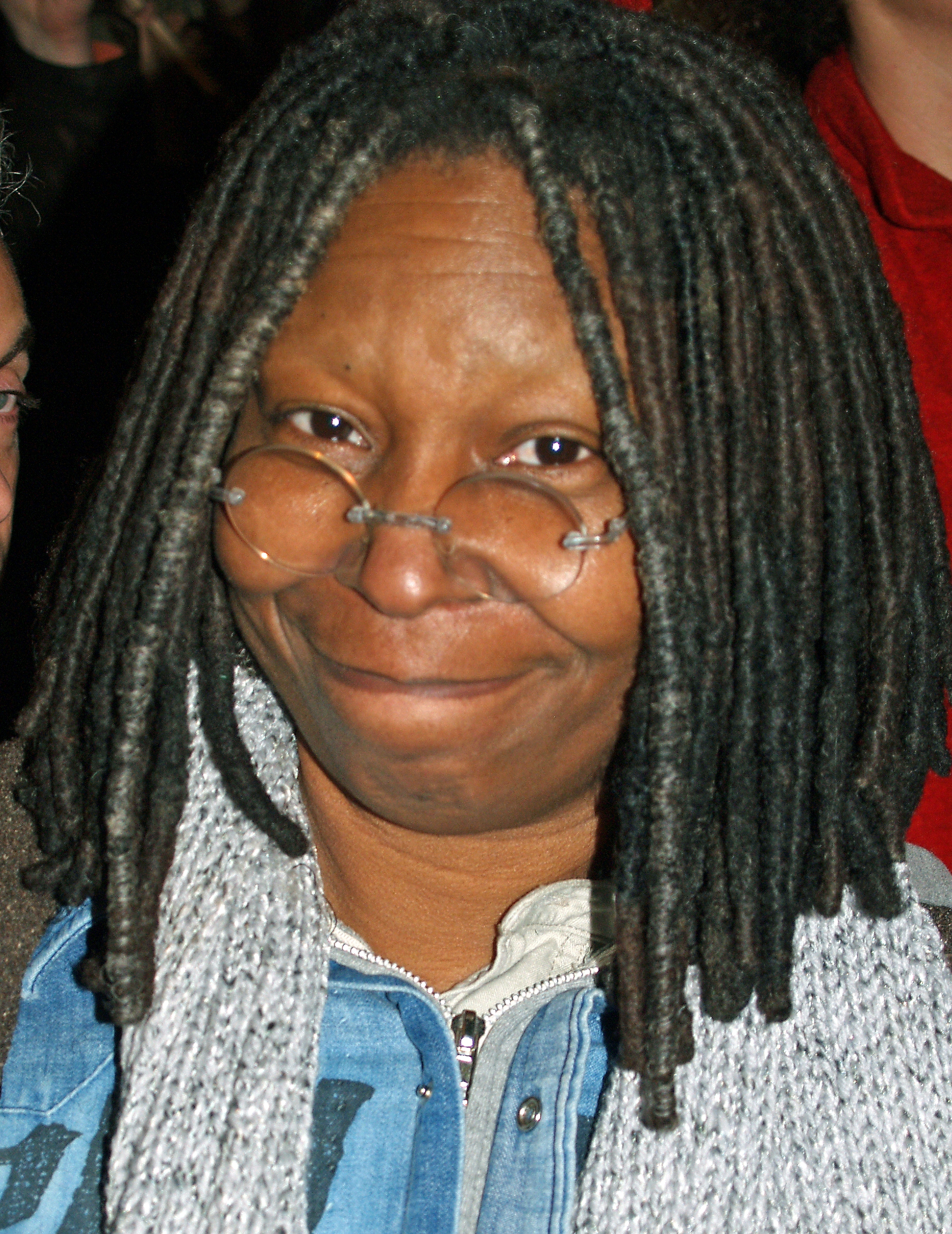
Comedian, actress and EGOT winner Whoopi Goldberg in 2008

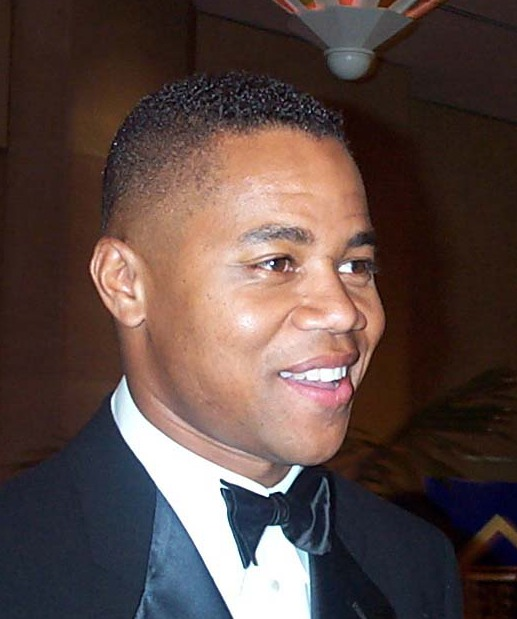
Actor and Academy Award winner Cuba Gooding Jr. in 2000

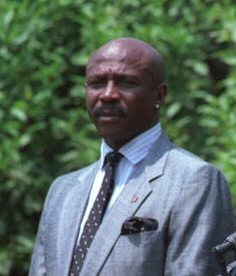
Actor and Academy Award winner Louis Gossett Jr. in 1987

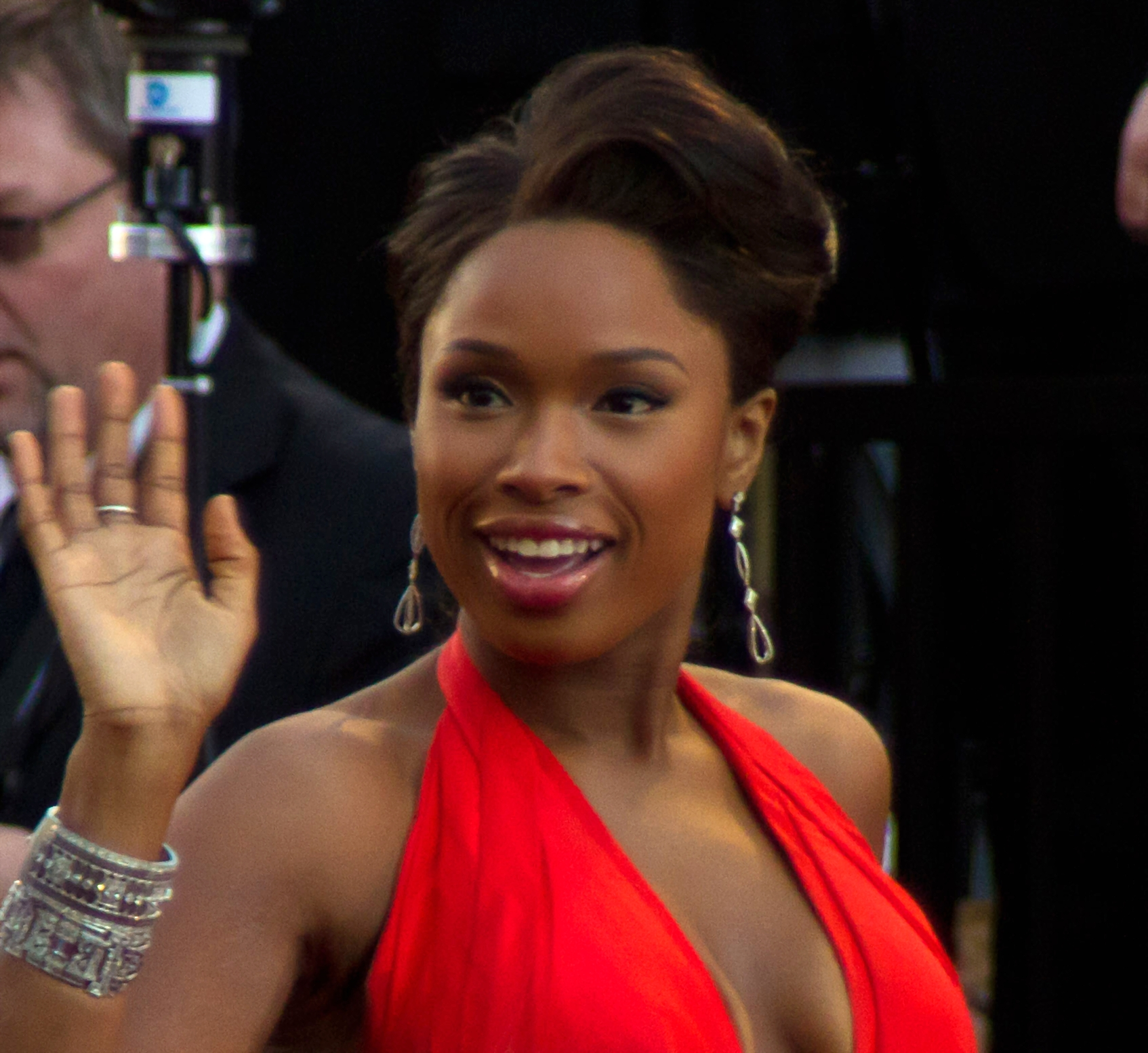
Actress and Academy Award winner Jennifer Hudson in 2011

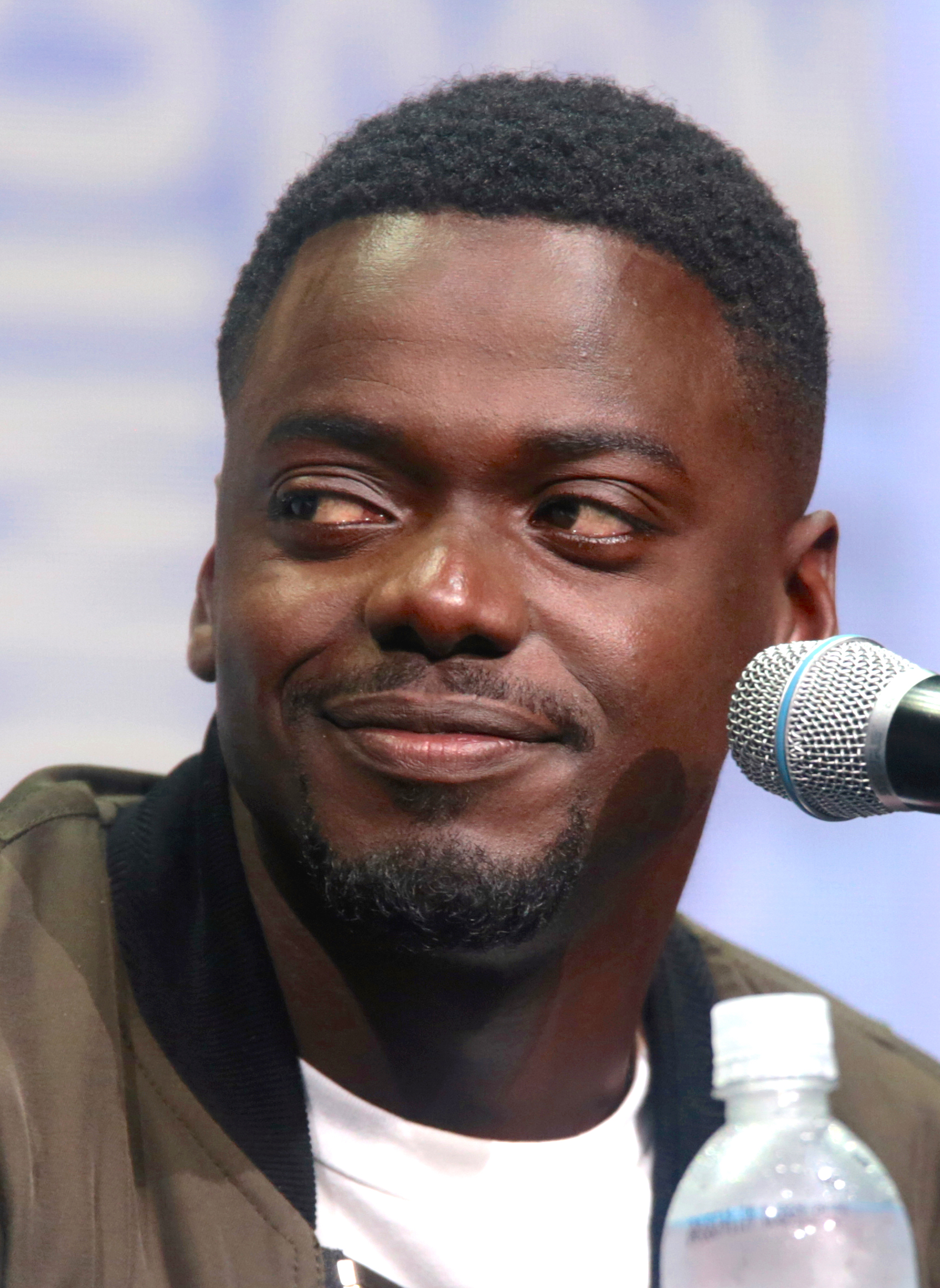
Actor and Academy Award winner Daniel Kaluuya in 2017

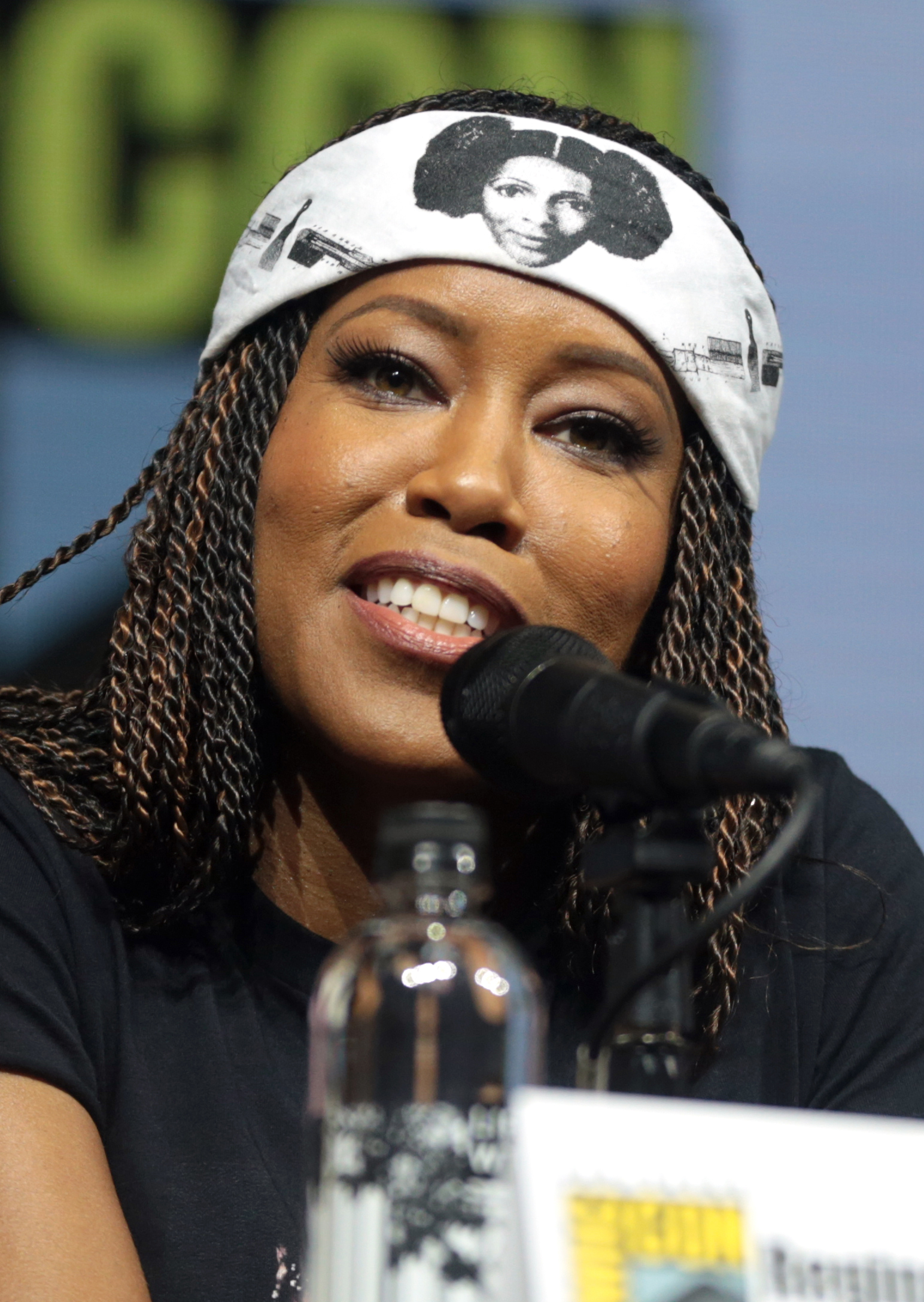
Actress and Academy Award winner Regina King in 2018

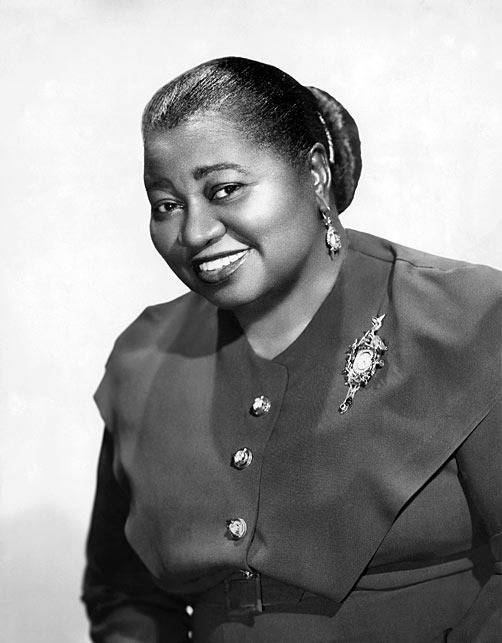
Actress and Academy Award winner Hattie McDaniel in 1939

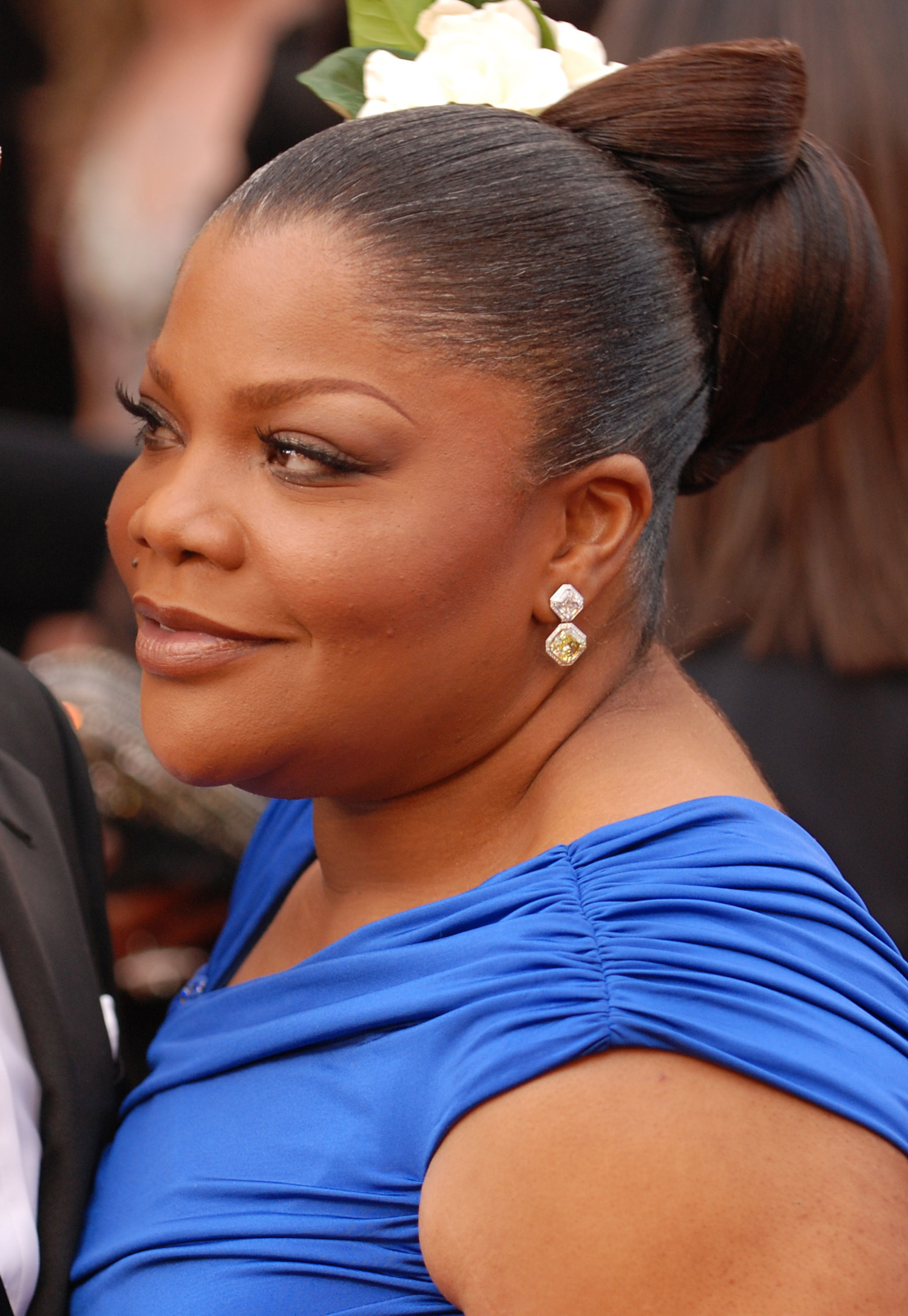
Actress and Academy Award winner Mo'Nique in 2010

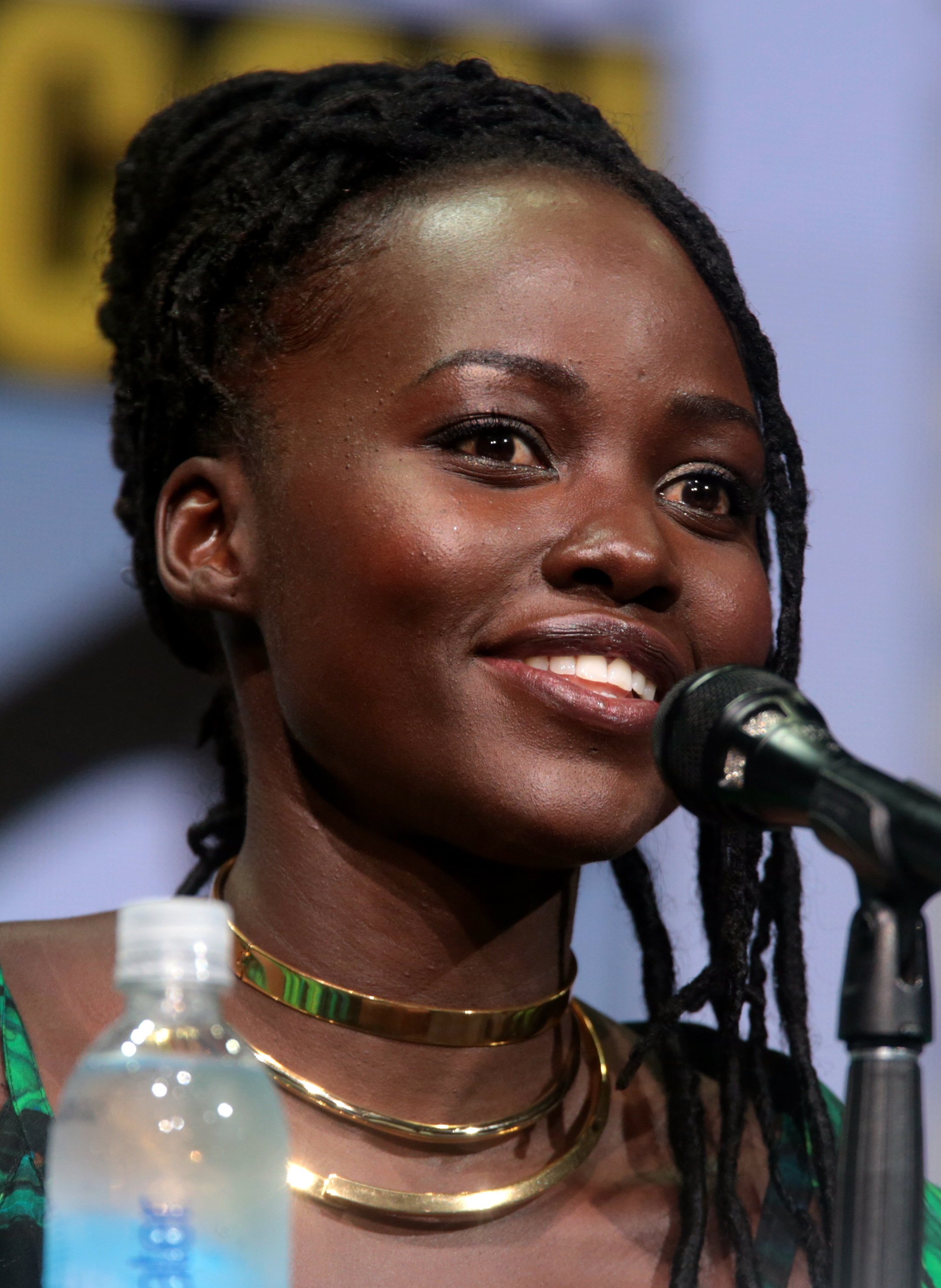
Actress and Academy Award winner Lupita Nyong'o in 2017

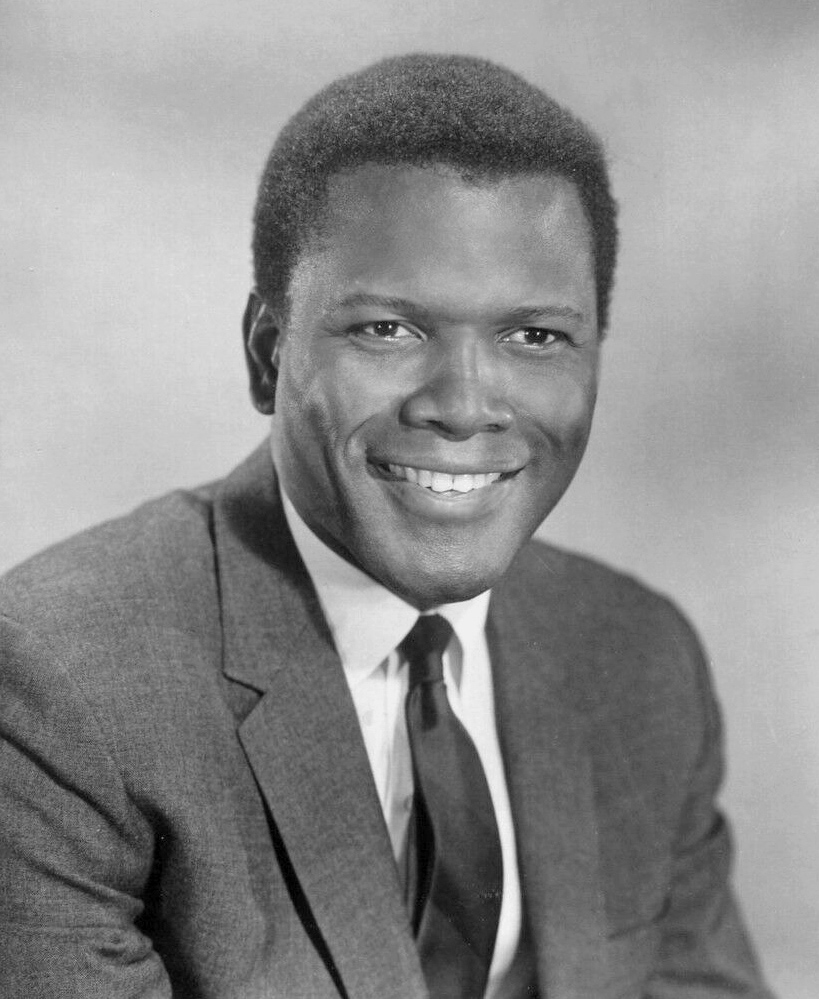
Actor and Academy Award winner Sidney Poitier in 1968

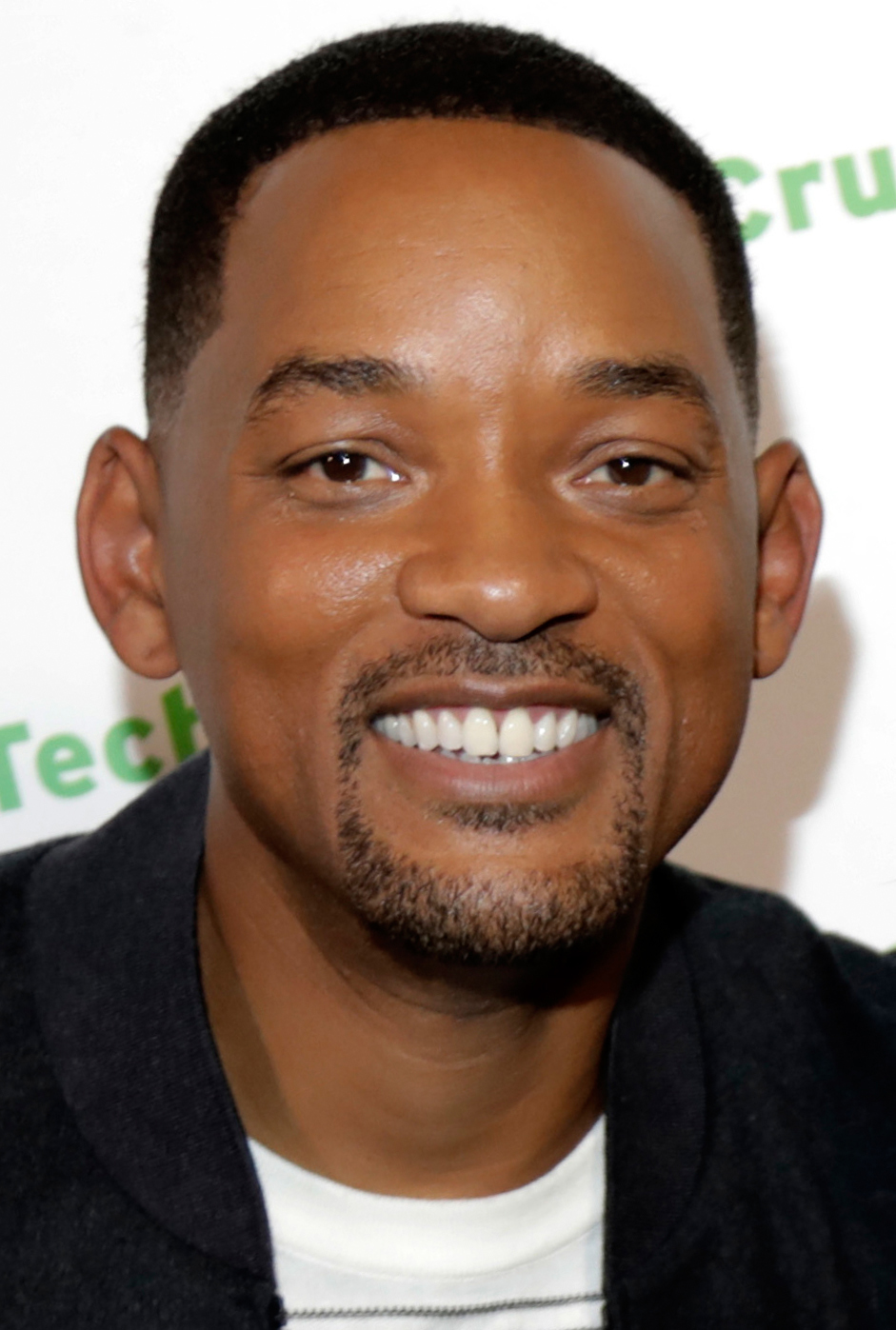
Actor and Academy Award winner Will Smith in 2019

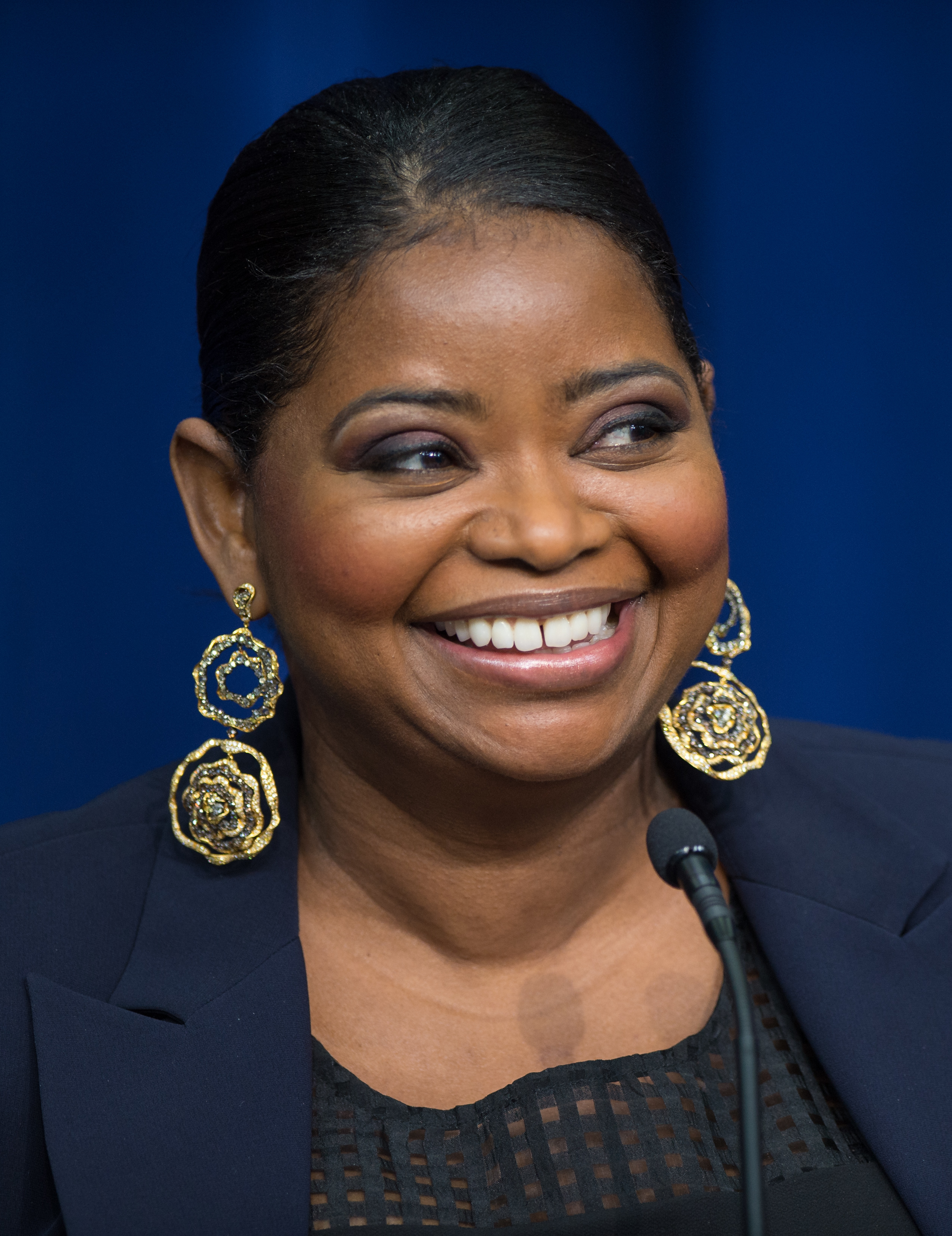
Actress and Academy Award winner Octavia Spencer in 2016

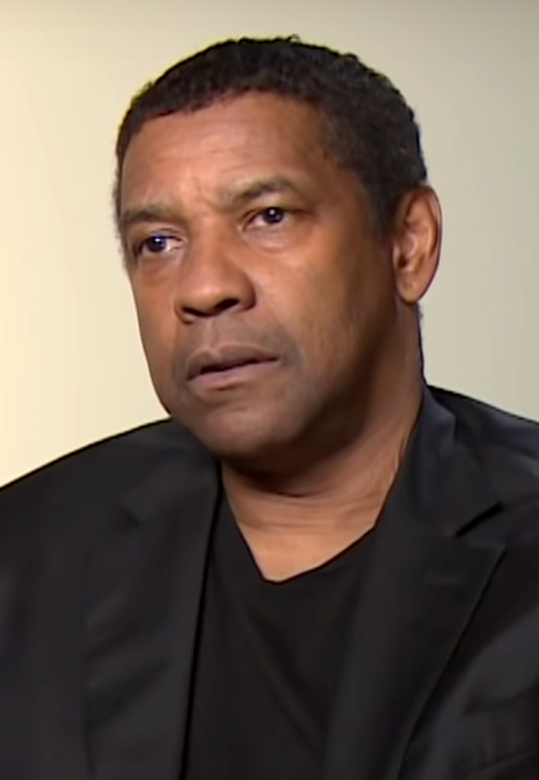
Actor and Academy Award winner Denzel Washington in 2018

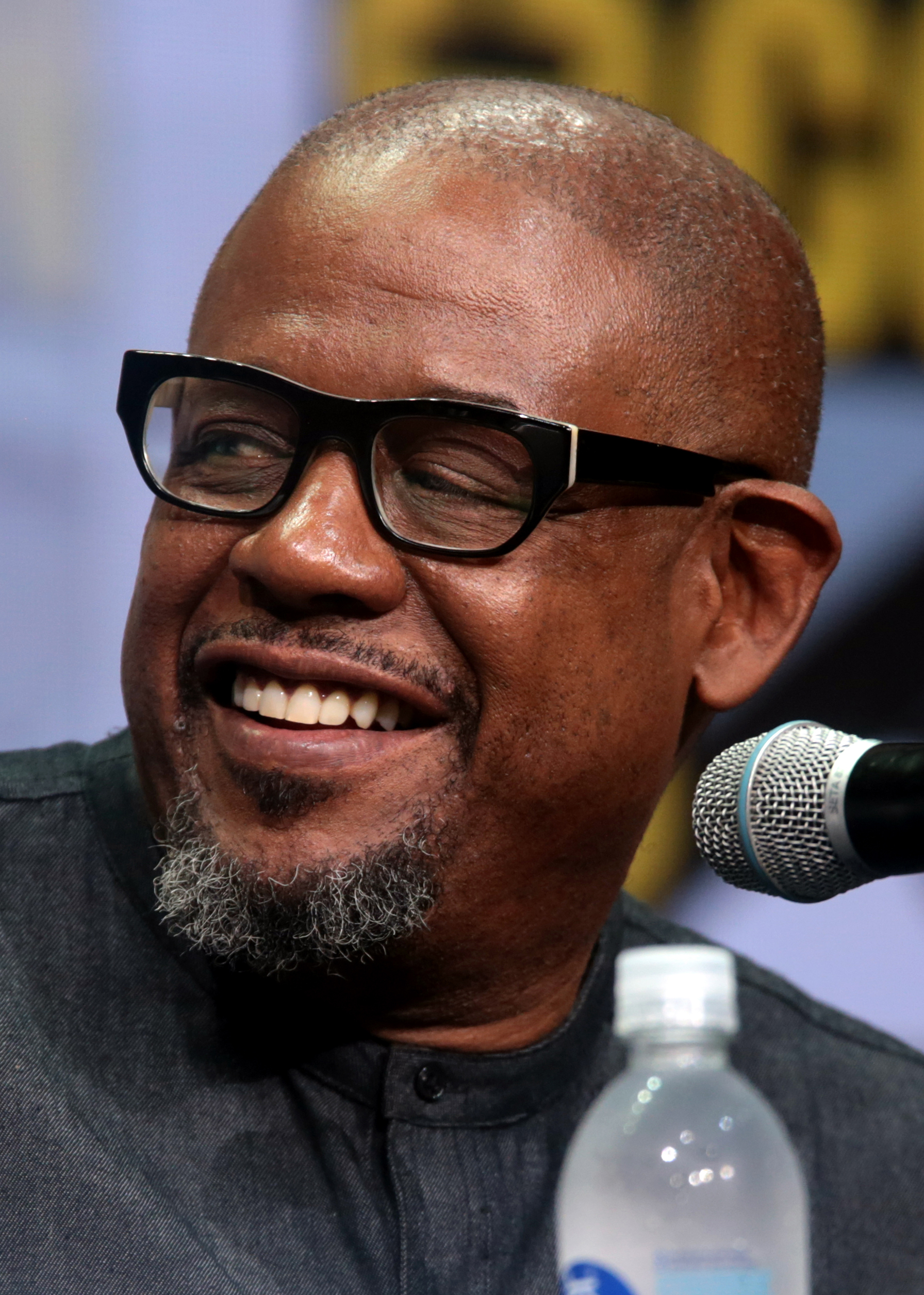
Actor and Academy Award winner Forest Whitaker in 2017
Directors

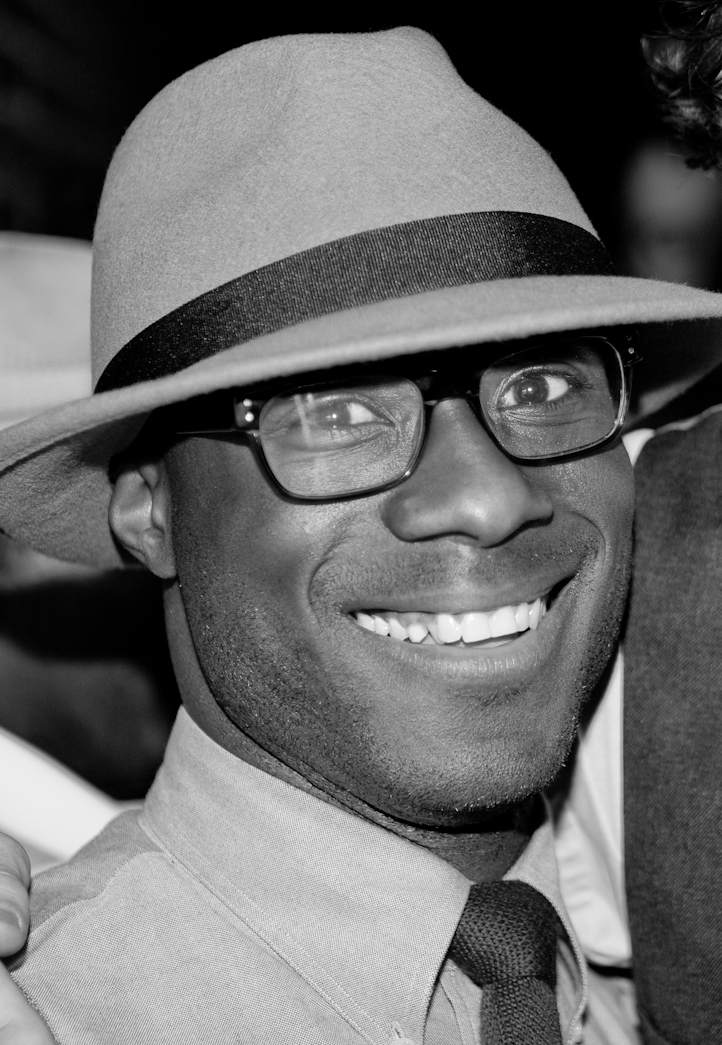
Director and Academy Award winner Barry Jenkins in 2009

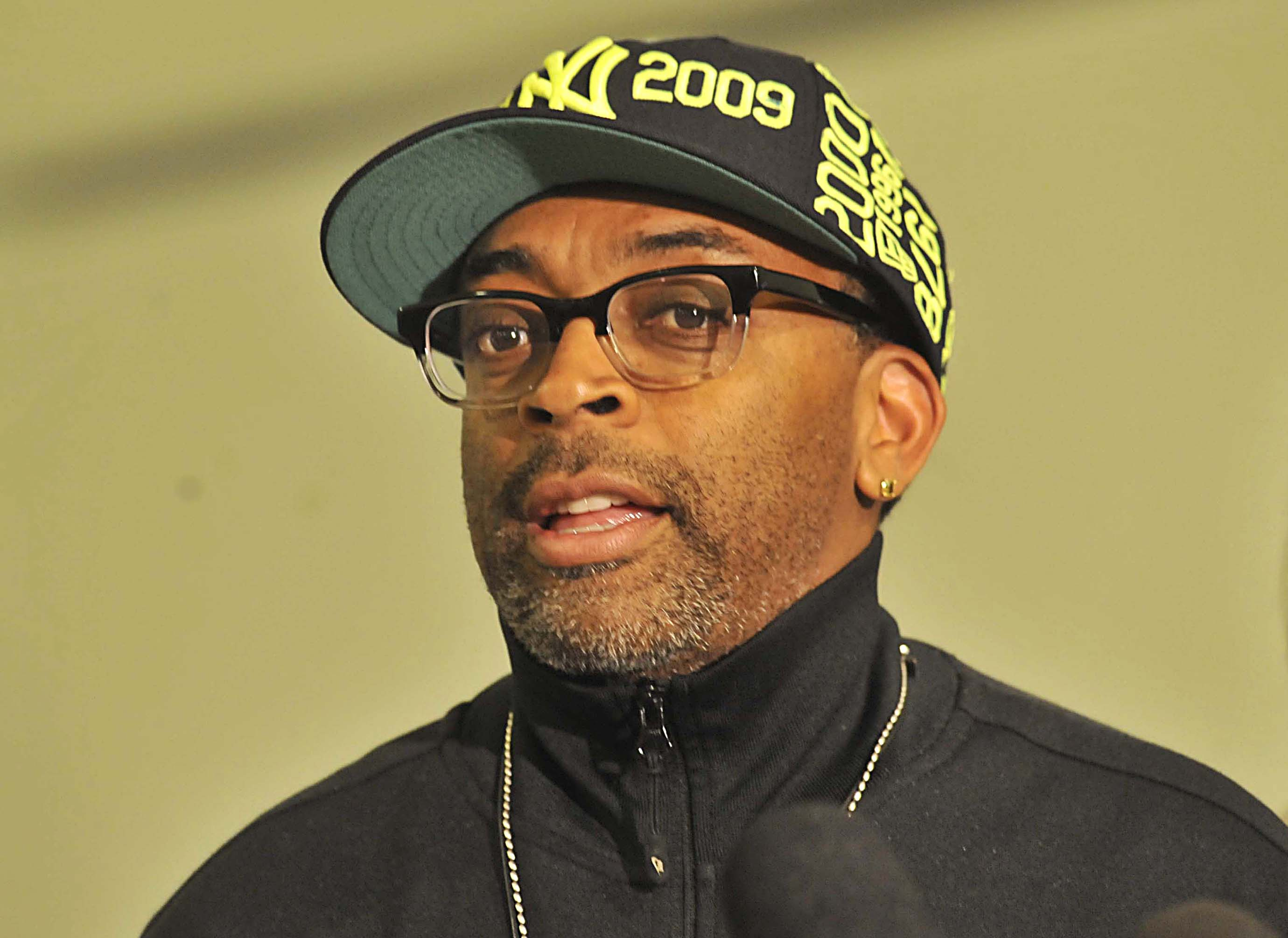
Academy Award-winning filmmaker Spike Lee in 2012

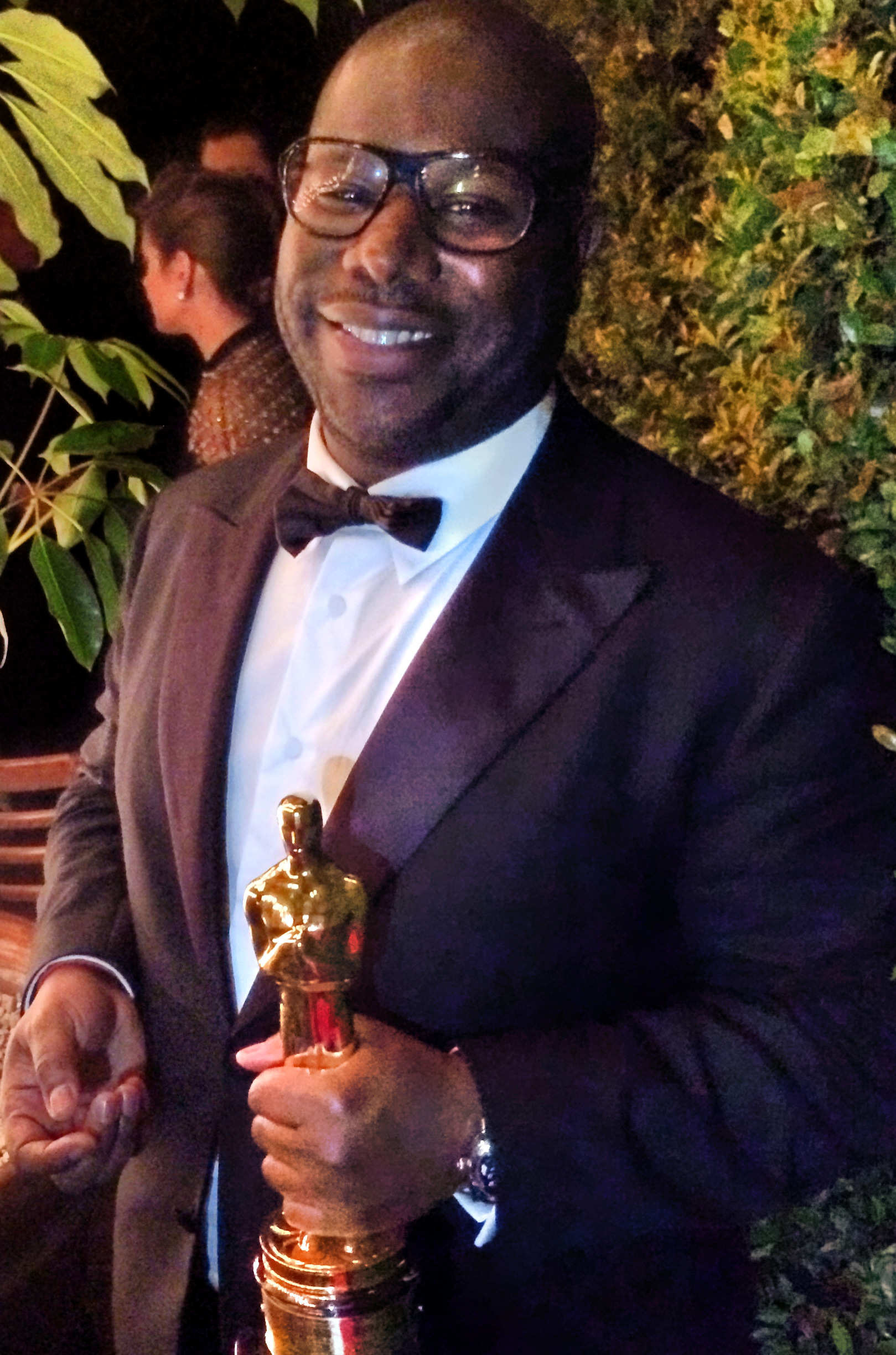
Director and Academy Award winner Steve McQueen at the Oscars in 2014

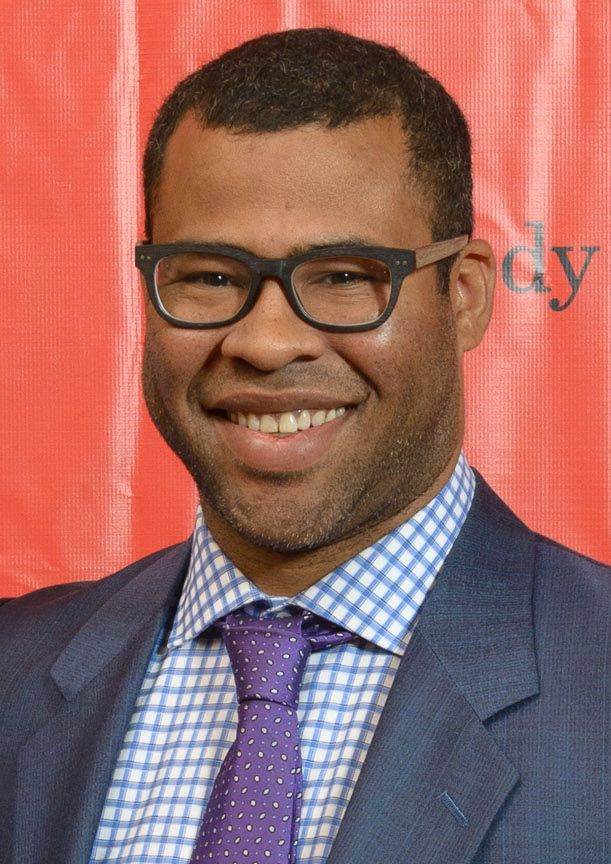
Director and Academy Award winner Jordan Peele in 2014
Writers

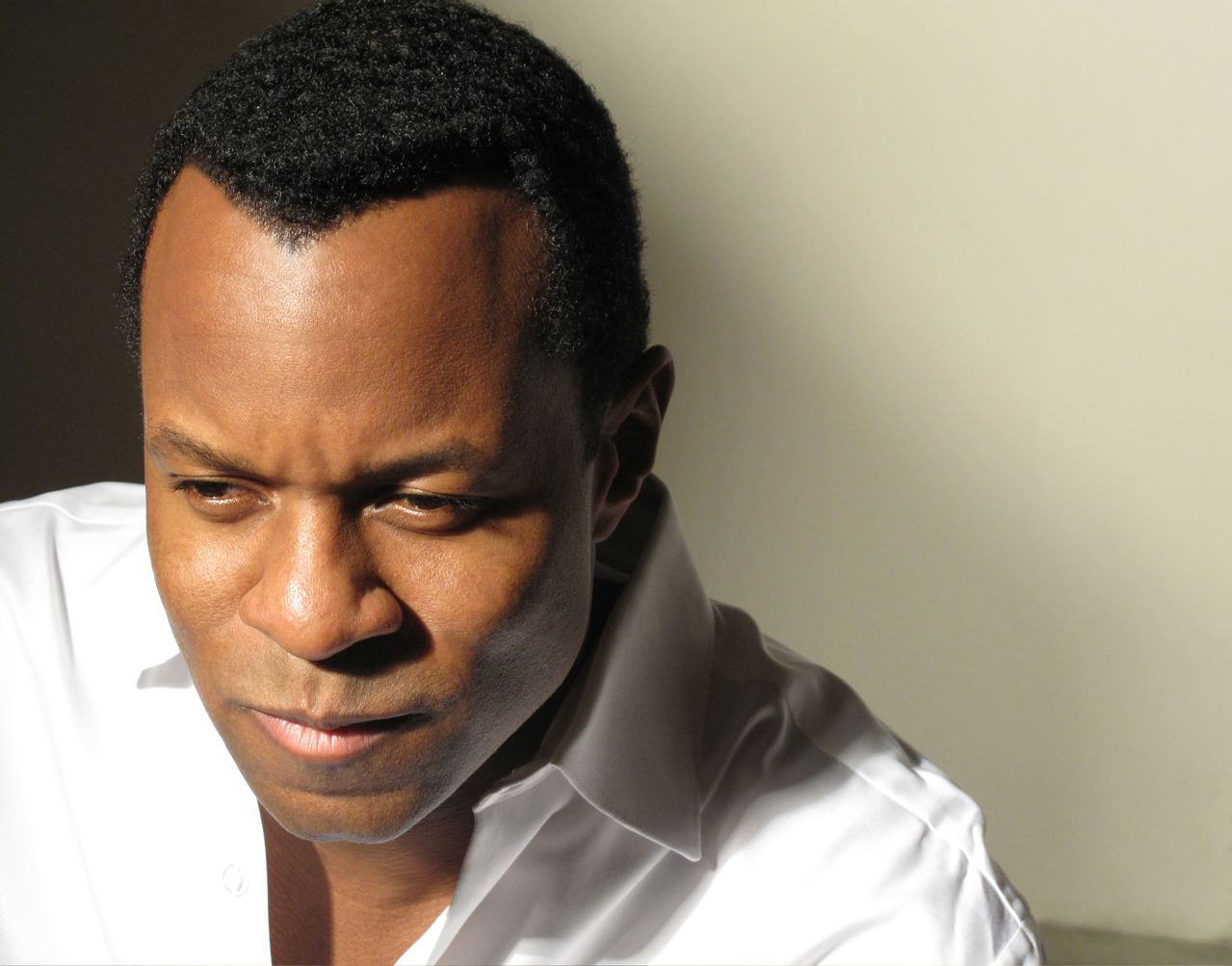
Writer and Academy Award winner Geoffrey Fletcher in 2010

== Theorists, critics and historians ==
=== Film critics ===
- Tony Langston at the Chicago Defender (1920s era)
- Sylvester Russell at the Indianapolis Freeman (1920s era)
- D. Ireland Thomas (1875–1955)
- Lester A. Walton (1882–1965) at The New York Age)

=== Academics and authors ===
- Donald Bogle (1944–present)
- Thomas Cripps (1932–2018)
- Phyllis R. Klotman (1924–2015)
- Audrey Thomas McCluskey (1940s?–present)

== Archives and collections ==
In the 1980s, G. William Jones led a restoration of early African American films, and Southern Methodist University has a collection named for him. Kino Lorber produced the Pioneers of African-American Cinema (2015) box set. Other notable collections include:

- Black Film Archive: Black films from 1915 to 1979
- The Library of Congress has African American films in its collection, and some coverage of the films.
- The Lucas Museum of Narrative Art has acquired a collection of Black Films.
- Pioneers of African-American Cinema (2015)
- The National Museum of African American History and Culture has film posters, lobby cards, and photographs in its collection.
- WUA University has an international collection with a lot of material from American films.

== See also ==
- Black women film pioneers
- Black women filmmakers
- Cinema of the United States
- List of African-American documentary films
- African American neighborhood
- List of black films of the 2010s
- Hood film
- List of films about Black girlhood
- Pioneers of African-American Cinema (2015)
- Jews in American cinema
- Native Americans in film
- Chicano cinema

== Bibliography ==
- Diawara, Manthia, ed. (1993). Black American Cinema. AFI Film Readers. Routledge. ISBN 978-0-415-90397-4.
- Gillespie, Michael Boyce (2016). Film Blackness: American Cinema and the Idea of Black Film. Duke University Press Books. ISBN 978-0-8223-6226-5.
- Cripps, Thomas (1978). Black Film as Genre. Indiana University Press. ISBN 978-0-253-37502-5.
- Cripps, Thomas (1977). Slow Fade to Black: The Negro in American Film, 1900–1942. Oxford University Press. ASIN B019NE3UPK.
- Reid, Mark A. (1993). Redefining Black Film. University of California Press. ISBN 978-0-520-07902-1.
- Yearwood, Gladstone Lloyd (1999). Black Film as a Signifying Practice: Cinema, Narration and the African American Aesthetic Tradition. Africa World Press. ISBN 978-0-86543-715-9.
