= List of African-American documentary films =

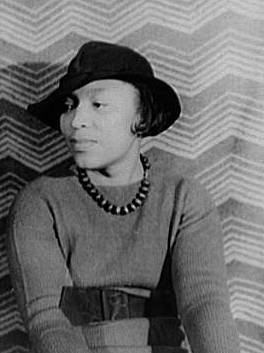
Noted author and anthropologist Zora Neale Hurston was also a filmmaker, most famously of the ethnographic documentary Commandment Keeper Church, Beaufort South Carolina, May 1940

This list of African American documentary films (1930s–present) includes films that were made by African Americans, as well as films on the topic of African Americans. (Films marked with an asterisk (*) are specifically about the Civil Rights Movement.)

== 1930s ==
- Marian Anderson: the Lincoln Memorial Concert * (1939)

== 1940s ==
- Commandment Keeper Church, Beaufort South Carolina, May 1940 (1940)
- Henry Browne, Farmer (1942)
- Negro Colleges in War Time (1943)
- We've Come a Long, Long Way (1944)
- The Negro Soldier (1944)
- The Negro Sailor (1945)
- Wings for This Man (1945)
- The Quiet One (1948)

== 1950s ==
- All My Babies (1953)
- A City Decides * (1956)
- The Cry of Jazz (1959)

== 1960s ==
- Integration Report 1 (1960)
- The Five Cities of June * (1963)
- Take This Hammer (1963)
- Children Without (1964)
- The March * (1964)
- Nine from Little Rock * (1964)
- A Time for Burning (1966)
- The Jungle (1967)
- Legendary Champions (1968)
- Eldridge Cleaver, Black Panther (1969)

== 1970s ==
- A.k.a. Cassius Clay (1970)
- Black Roots (1970)
- Jack Johnson (1970)
- King: A Filmed Record... Montgomery to Memphis * (1970)
- The Murder of Fred Hampton (1971)
- Black Rodeo (1972)
- Malcolm X * (1972)
- Black Shadows on a Silver Screen (1974)
- Always for Pleasure (1978)
- Goodnight Miss Ann (1978)
- 80 Blocks From Tiffany's (1979)
- Paul Robeson: Tribute to an Artist (1979)

== 1980s ==
- Miles of Smiles, Years of Struggle * (1982)
- Style Wars (1983)
- You Got to Move * (1985)
- Ethnic Notions (1987)
- Eyes on the Prize, part I * (1987)
- Hail! Hail! Rock 'n' Roll (1987)
- The Spirit Moves: A History of Black Social Dance on Film, 1900–1986 (1987)
- Adam Clayton Powell * (1989)
- Looking for Langston (1989)
- Tongues Untied (1989)

== 1990s ==
- Paris Is Burning (film) (1990)
- Eyes on the Prize, part II * (1990)
- Color Adjustment (1992)
- A Great Day in Harlem (1994)
- Freedom on My Mind * (1994)
- Malcolm X: Make It Plain * (1994)
- A Time for Justice * (1994)
- Black is... Black Ain't (1995)
- VINTAGE - Families of Value (1995)
- All God's Children (1996)
- All Power to the People (1996)
- The Church of Saint Coltrane (1996)
- The Last Angel of History (1996)
- 4 Little Girls * (1997)
- Blacks and Jews (1997)
- Colors Straight Up (1997)
- Midnight Ramble (1997)
- MPG: Motion Picture Genocide (1997)

== 2000s ==
- 4CHOSEN: The Documentary (2008)
- Afro-Punk (2003)
- Banished (2006)
- Beah: A Black Woman Speaks (2003)
- The Black Candle (2008)
- The Black List: Volume 1 (2008)
- The Black List: Volume 2 (2009)
- The Blues (2003)
- Hairkutt (2005)
- Colored Frames * (2007)
- Dare Not Walk Alone * (2006)
- E Minha Cara/That's My Face (2002)
- Faubourg Treme: The Untold Story of Black New Orleans (2008)
- February One: The Story of the Greensboro Four *
- Flight of the Red Tail
- Frederick Douglass and the White Negro (2008)
- From Swastika to Jim Crow
- A Girl Like Me
- Good Hair
- Hardwood
- Home of the Brave* (2004)
- Jim Brown: All-American
- LaLee's Kin: The Legacy of Cotton
- Legacy (2000)
- Maafa 21
- Marcus Garvey: Look for me in the Whirlwind
- Meeting David Wilson
- Mighty Times: The Children's March *
- Mississippi Cold Case *
- My Nappy Roots: A Journey Through Black Hair-itage
- Negroes with Guns: Rob Williams and Black Power (2004)
- Neshoba *
- The Pact (2006)
- Red Tail Reborn (2007)
- Revolution '67
- Rize
- Salute (2008)
- Scottsboro: An American Tragedy *
- Shouting Fire: Stories from the Edge of Free Speech
- Sister Wife
- Slavery and the Making of America
- Soundtrack for a Revolution *
- Street Fight
- The Sugar Babies
- Sweet Honey in the Rock: Raise Your Voice
- This Is the Life (2008)
- Tradition Is a Temple
- Twelve Disciples of Nelson Mandela
- Why We Bang
- The Witness: From the Balcony of Room 306 *

== 2010s ==
- 13th
- The Barber of Birmingham *
- The Black List: Volume 3 (2010)
- The Black Panthers: Vanguard of the Revolution
- The Czar of Black Hollywood
- Dark Girls
- The Fab Five
- Freedom Riders *
- Hale County This Morning, This Evening
- Hidden Colors, part 1: The Untold History Of People Of Aboriginal, Moor, and African Descent (2011)
- Hidden Colors, part 2: The Triumph of Melanin (2012)
- Hidden Colors, part 3: The Rules of Racism (2014)
- Hidden Colors, part 4: The Religion of White Supremacy (2016)
- I Am Not Your Negro (2016)
- In the Hour of Chaos *
- Through a Lens Darkly: Black Photographers and the Emergence of a People
- "Good Hair" and Other Dubious Distinctions
- Motherland
- No Crossover: The Trial of Allen Iverson
- No Lye: An American Beauty Story
- O.J.: Made in America (2016)
- Reincarnated (2013), on Snoop Dogg's conversion to Rastafari

== 2020s ==
- Mama Gloria (2020)

== See also ==
- The Black Association of Documentary Filmmakers
- The Black Association of Documentary Filmmakers West
- The Black Documentary Collective
