= American Descendants of Slavery =

American political movement

American Descendants of Slavery (ADOS) is a term referring to descendants of enslaved Africans in the area that would become the United States (from its colonial period onward), and to the political movement of the same name. Both the term and the movement grew out of the hashtag #ADOS created by Yvette Carnell and Antonio Moore.

The ADOS movement focuses mainly on demanding reparations for the system of slavery in the United States. They want colleges, employers and the federal government to prioritize ADOS and argue that affirmative action policies originally designed to help ADOS have been used largely to benefit other groups.

Supporters of the ADOS movement say they should have their own ethnic designation on census forms and college applications, and should not be lumped in with other Black people—namely modern Black African immigrants to the United States and Black immigrants from the Caribbean.

== Founders, views, and controversies ==
The American Descendants of Slavery movement was founded by Yvette Carnell and Antonio Moore, who co-host online ADOS radio shows. Carnell has been an aide for two Democratic politicians, Senator Barbara Boxer and Congressman Robert Marion Berry. Moore is a defense attorney in Los Angeles.

The ADOS's website says that it seeks "a New Deal for Black America" including, among other things, reparations for slavery specifically for American descendants of slavery in the United States; a 50% government-funded tax credit for college expenses for American descendants of slavery in the United States (75% for those who attend historically black colleges or universities); restoration of the protections of the Voting Rights Act; prison reform; and a minimum of 15% of Small Business Administration loans for ADOS businesses. The group supports affirmative action for American descendants of slavery, but opposes it for all other ethnic minorities.

A distinguishing feature of the ADOS movement is its explicit emphasis on black Americans who descended from slavery and its disagreements with black immigrants from Africa and the Caribbean. The group demands "a new designation on the Census with ADOS and another for Black immigrants" to the United States. Supporters of ADOS push the issue on social media with the hashtag #ADOS and state that it "sets out to shift the dialogue around the identity of what it is to be African American in an effort to move the discussion from melanin and properly center the discussion around lineage"; they view ADOS as having distinct interests from broader groups, such as people of color or ethnic minorities generally.

The ADOS movement's leaders say that it is nonpartisan. Carnell and Moore identify as anti-Trump and lifelong Democrats, and the group has frequently attacked the Democratic Party, urging black voters to seek an alternative to it. The movement has become "lightning rod for criticism on the left", and pro-Trump and right-wing figures, such as Ann Coulter and Ali Alexander, have used the #ADOS hashtag. Carnell once appeared in YouTube video in a "Make America Great Again" hat, later saying that it was a joke. The group's supporters have been critical of immigration, and have sometimes deployed rhetoric with an anti-immigrant cast, although they deny being xenophobic. In Twitter posts, Carnell defended the term "blood and soil", a slogan used by the Nazis; Moore has criticized a CBS News report written by a reporter with a Hispanic surname, asserting that the journalist "clearly has a conflicted interest to write the story". Carnell previously served as a board member of the anti-immigration group Progressives for Immigration Reform, which is tied to right-wing groups funded by nativist financier John Tanton. In September 2019, Progressives for Immigration Reform praised ADOS calling it "a movement that understands the impact unbridled immigration has had on our country's most vulnerable workers". Carnell's affiliation with the group has been a focus of criticism of the ADOS movement.

In 2019, some ADOS activists challenged Kamala Harris's authenticity as a Black woman, asserting that she was not "African American" (Harris's father is Jamaican American). The claim suggested that black Americans of immigrant descent, even from countries with a history of slavery under colonial rule (such as Jamaica) do not share the same struggle against racism and discrimination as the descendants of Black people in the United States. The claim that Harris was not authentically black was amplified by right-wing figures, including Donald Trump Jr., and criticized by civil rights leaders, who accused Carnell of engaging in xenophobic "birtherism". Carnell and Moore have also criticized the African-American intellectual Ta-Nehisi Coates for his past support of Barack Obama because of his pushing only for a public study of reparations rather than endorsing reparations.

The group's first national conference, held in October 2019 at Simmons College in Louisville, Kentucky, attracted more than a thousand attendees; guest speakers included Marianne Williamson and Cornel West. Congressman John Yarmuth attended a session at the conference.

In a 2020 article in Misinformation Review, a journal published by the Shorenstein Center on Media, Politics and Public Policy at Harvard's Kennedy School of Government (HKS), a group of authors, including academics and journalists, some affiliated with the Democratic Party-linked activist group MoveOn, analyzed postings with the #ADOS hashtag on Twitter in the runup to that year's elections, where ADOS had urged voters not to cast a presidential vote for any Democrat unless the party formally endorsed reparations. The authors concluded that ADOS was a disinformation operation that served the interests of the political right by discouraging Black people from voting. At the end of 2021, after informal and formal complaints from ADOS and two reviews that found fault with the study's methodology, Misinformation Review retracted the paper (the authors admitted some of their critics' arguments were valid but stood by their work). In mid-2022, Carnell and Moore sued HKS, the paper's authors, MoveOn and several other unknown defendants, alleging defamation.

== Size of movement ==
The movement is "tiny but outspoken"; the number of active supporters is believed to be in the thousands.

== Reception ==
New York Times writer Farah Stockman called ADOS "the most polarizing subject that I have ever tackled". Stockman questioned in November 2019 whether the movement was large enough to warrant discussion on a national level but decided to print an article about the group in The Times.

Hubert Adjei-Kontoh of The Outline opined that "#ADOS has managed to synthesize the black left-wing critique of America's origins with a right-wing belief in the inherent superiority of those who were born in America." Gregory Carr, co-chairman of Afro-American studies at Howard University and a longtime reparations supporter, called ADOS a "weaponized" movement that had become "indefensibly xenophobic and nativist". Kevin Cokley of the University of Texas at Austin is critical of the organization's desire to separate the descendants of slaves from African immigrants and encouraged the two groups to be united under an African American identity. Malcolm Nance described supporters as trolls, calling them "a mix of [African American] proTrump racists [and] nuts". Black commentator and author Roland Martin has described the notion of a "black purity test" as promoted by the movement "nothing but self-hate cloaked in black self-love". Talib Kweli is critical of the group because he believes they are aligned with the Republican Party against immigration. Shireen Mitchell stated the group was making it easier for black voters to justify voting for Donald Trump.

Alvin Bernard Tillery, Jr., an associate professor at Northwestern University, states that the issues ADOS raised on who should receive reparations will have to be reflected upon by the black community. William A. Darity Jr. believes the ADOS' premise is based on a distinctive ethnic identity that exists among the descendants of American slaves. He defended ADOS against nativism claims and believes they are supporting people who have not benefitted in the current American system. Cornel West stated at an ADOS conference in Louisville, Kentucky that the ADOS movement was resuming the work started by Martin Luther King Jr. and Malcolm X.

== See also ==
- African-American culture
- Foundational Black Americans
- History of civil rights in the United States
- People of African descent – Spread of people with African heritage
- Race and ethnicity in the United States
- Reparations for slavery debate in the United States
- Indigenous Black Canadians, a term used to distinguish Black Canadians of earlier ancestries (including Black Nova Scotians) from more recent arrivals from the Caribbean, Latin America and Africa
