= Hidden Colors =

2010s American documentary film series

Hidden Colors Part 1: The Untold History of People of Aboriginal, Moor, and African Descent Part 2: The Triumph of Melanin Part 3: The Rules of Racism Part 4: The Religion of White Supremacy Part 5: The Art of Black Warfare
- Directed by: Tariq Nasheed
- Produced by: Part 1: Ola Akinroluyo; Part 2: Thaddeus Allah; Part 3: Amos Kulumba; Haneef Muhammad; Darnell Washington
- Starring: Please see sections
- Cinematography: Part 1: Chas Pangburn; Part 2: Keith Mohmed; Terrance Thompson; Part 3: Tony “Flex God” Allah II; Janel Jackson; Keith Mohmed; Jojambe Lawrence
- Edited by: Part 1: Olono Mohammed; Part 2: Maurice Brawith; Umar Allah; Part 3: Marquis Crofoot
- Production company: King Flex Entertainment
- Distributed by: King Flex Entertainment
- Release dates: April 14, 2011 (Part 1); December 6, 2012 (Part 2); June 26, 2014 (Part 3); May 26, 2016 (Part 4); August 1, 2019 (Part 5)
- Country: United States
- Language: English

Hidden Colors is a series of documentary films directed by Tariq Nasheed and released between 2011 and 2019, to explain the marginalizing of people of African descent in America and across the world. Critical reception has been mixed to negative, with reviews describing the films' content mainly as discredited conspiracy theories.

== Series ==
The first film in the series, Hidden Colors: The Untold History of People of Aboriginal, Moor, and African Descent, was given a limited theatrical release on April 14, 2011. The second in the series, Hidden Colors 2: The Triumph of Melanin, was released the following year on December 6, 2012. The third film in the series, Hidden Colors 3: The Rules of Racism, was released on June 26, 2014. The fourth film in the series, Hidden Colors 4: The Religion of White Supremacy was successfully funded on Kickstarter in March 2015. The fifth film in the series, Hidden Colors 5: The Art of Black Warfare, was released in August 2019.

=== Hidden Colors: The Untold History of People of Aboriginal, Moor, and African Descent ===
The first installment in the series was released on April 14, 2011. The film discusses the role of African and aboriginal people in history and argues some achievements have not been properly recorded or credited to them. Hidden Colors features several interviews with commentators on subjects such as the race and appearance of Jesus Christ and the reasons behind the end of slavery. The film also states Africans were the first to circumnavigate the globe, there was "pre-European settlement in the United States", that Africans created the first Asian dynasties, and that the Vatican created Egyptology.

==== Cast ====
- Tariq Nasheed
- Phil Valentine
- Frances Cress Welsing
- Shahrazad Ali
- Sabir Bey
- Booker T. Coleman
- Umar Johnson

=== Hidden Colors 2: The Triumph of Melanin ===
The second installment was released on December 6, 2012 and was also directed by Nasheed. The documentary further explores issues surrounding people of African and aboriginal descent such as the global African presence and the treatment of Black economic communities in America. Other film topics include the investigation of melanin.

==== Cast ====
- Michelle Alexander
- KRS-One
- Tariq Nasheed
- Runoko Rashidi
- Phil Valentine (Not the talk show host)
- James Small
- Claud Anderson
- Tony Browder
- Booker T. Coleman
- Umar Johnson

=== Hidden Colors 3: The Rules of Racism ===
The third installment was released on June 26, 2014. The film focuses on the topic of race, racism, and history within the United States.

==== Cast ====
- Shahrazad Ali
- Carol Anderson
- David Banner
- Dick Gregory
- Paul Mooney
- Khalil Gibran Muhammad
- Nas
- Tariq Nasheed
- Killer Mike
- Phil Valentine
- Frances Cress Welsing
- George Fraser
- Joy Degruy
- Umar Johnson
- Kaba Kamene

=== Hidden Colors 4: The Religion of White Supremacy ===
- Tariq Nasheed
- Jennifer Tosch
- Tony Browder
- Llaila Afrika
- Boyce Watkins
- Robin Walker
- Phil Valentine
- James Small
- Eric Sheppard
- Patricia Newton
- Nteri Nelson
- Killer Mike
- Kaba Kamene
- Jim Brown
- Delbert Blair

=== Hidden Colors 5: The Art of Black Warfare ===
- Tariq Nasheed
- Claud Anderson
- Brother Polight
- Kaba Kamene
- Shahrazad Ali
- Ice-T
- Chuck D
- David Banner
- Rizza Islam
- Charm Tims
- Michael Jai White
- Jabari Osaze
- Kmt Shockley
- James Small

== Reception ==
The radio program Powertalk hosted by Lorraine Jacques-White called Hidden Colors "eye-opening and necessary."

A review of Hidden Colors 2 published in The Village Voice dismissed much of the documentary as conspiracy, saying that Nasheed demonstrates "a seeming total inability to separate gibble-gabble from revealed truth, vital social concern from talk about Chemtrails and digressive subchapters with titles like 'The Hidden Truth About Santa Claus.'" The reviewer praised one contributor, Michelle Alexander, who the Voice noted was the only woman in the film, saying that "Her well-reasoned discussion of the American penal system is compelling, but it's an embarrassment that she should be placed alongside the likes of Phil Valentine, a metaphysician whose malarkey about AIDS ("the so-called immunity system of the homosexual") is a low point, as is Umar Johnson's lionization of the late, unlamented Gaddafi and the odd nostalgia for segregation that runs throughout."

BET described the series as "one of the most successful Black independent documentaries."

The Root called the series "semifactual" and influenced by the Hoteps subculture.
