= Frances Cress Welsing =

American psychiatrist (1935–2016)

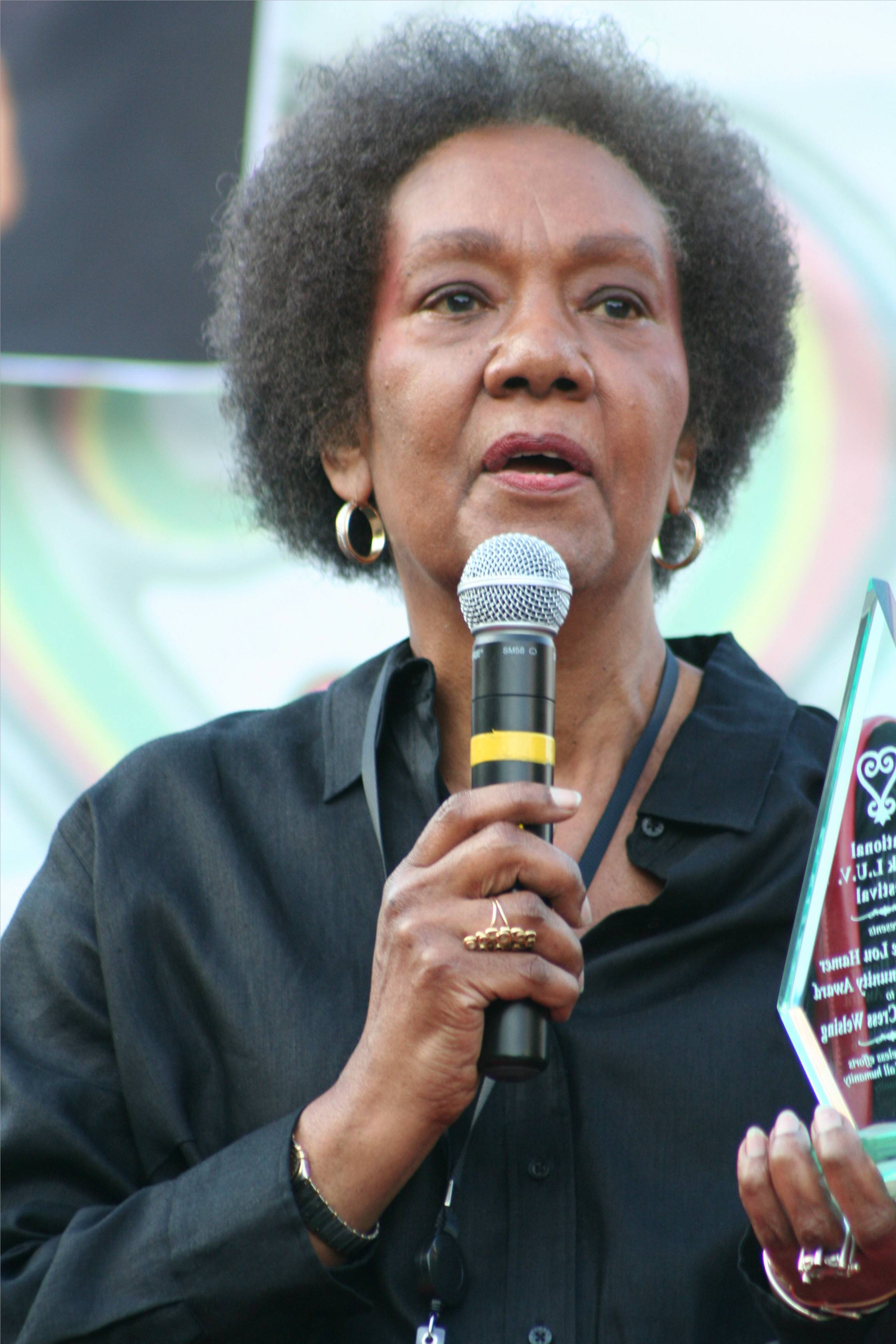
- Welsing receiving the Community Award at National Black LUV Festival on September 21, 2008
- Born: Frances Luella Cress; March 18, 1935; Chicago, Illinois, U.S.
- Died: January 2, 2016 (aged 80); Washington, D.C., U.S.
- Education: Antioch College (B.S.); Howard University (M.D.)
- Occupation: Physician
- Known for: The Isis Papers: The Keys to the Colors (1991)

Frances Luella Cress Welsing (March 18, 1935 – January 2, 2016) was an American psychiatrist and well-known proponent of the pseudoscientific melanin theory. Her 1970 essay, The Cress Theory of Color-Confrontation and Racism (White Supremacy), offered her interpretation of what she described as the origins of white supremacy culture. She was the author of The Isis Papers: The Keys to the Colors (1991).

== Biography ==
=== Early life and education ===
Welsing was born Frances Luella Cress in Chicago on March 18, 1935. Her father, Henry Noah Cress, was a physician, and her mother, Ida Mae Griffin, was a teacher. She was the middle child of three girls, her elder sister named Lorne, and the younger Barbara. In 1957, she earned a B.S. degree at Antioch College, in Yellow Springs, Ohio.

In 1962, Welsing received an M.D. from Howard University. In the 1960s, Welsing moved to Washington, D.C., and worked at many hospitals, especially children's hospitals.

=== Career ===
While Welsing was an assistant professor at Howard University, she formulated her first body of work in 1969, The Cress Theory of Color-Confrontation. She self-published it in 1970. The paper subsequently appeared in the May 1974 edition of The Black Scholar. This was an introduction to her thoughts that would be developed in The Isis Papers, released 22 years later. This was a compilation of Welsing's essays about global and local race relations.

In 1992, Welsing published The Isis Papers: The Keys to the Colors. The book is a compilation of essays that she had written over 18 years.

The title was inspired by the ancient Egyptian goddess Isis. According to Welsing, all the names of the gods were significant; however, Welsing specifically chose the name Isis for her admiration of "truth and justice".

In her book Welsing talks about the genocide of people of color globally, along with issues faced by black Americans. According to Welsing, the genocide of people of color is caused by white people's inability to produce melanin. The minority status of whites has caused what she calls a preoccupation with white genetic survival.

Welsing believed that injustice caused by racism will end when "non-white people worldwide recognize, analyze, understand and discuss openly the genocidal dynamic." She also tackled issues such as drug use, murder, teen pregnancy, infant mortality, incarceration, and unemployment. According to Welsing, the cause of these issues is white supremacy. Black men are at the center of Welsing's discussion because, according to her, they "have the greatest potential to cause white genetic annihilation."

=== Death ===
By December 30, 2015, Welsing had suffered two strokes and was placed in critical care at a Washington, D.C.-area hospital. She died on January 2, 2016, at the age of 80.

Welsing was mourned by Benjamin Chavis, president of the National Newspaper Publishers Association, by Kevin Washington, president of the Association of Black Psychologists, and by Chuck D of Public Enemy, who credited her as inspiration for the album Fear of a Black Planet.

== Views ==
In The Isis Papers, she described white people as the genetically defective descendants of recessive genetic mutants. She wrote that due to this "defective" mutation, they may have been forcibly expelled from Africa, among other possibilities. Racism, in the views of Welsing, is a conspiracy "to ensure white genetic survival". She attributed AIDS and addiction to crack cocaine and other substances to "chemical and biological warfare" by white people.

Welsing defined racism as:

"Racism (white supremacy) is the local and global power system dynamic, structured and maintained by those who classify themselves as white; whether consciously or subconsciously determined; this system consists of patterns of perception, logic, symbol formation, thought, speech, action and emotional response, as conducted simultaneously in all areas of people activity: economics, education, entertainment, labor, law, politics, religion, sex, and war. The ultimate purpose of the system is to ensure white genetic survival and to prevent white genetic annihilation on Earth—a planet in which the overwhelming majority of people are classified as non-white (black, brown, red, and yellow) by white skinned people. All of the non-white people are genetically dominant (in terms of skin coloration) compared to the genetic recessive white skinned people".

Welsing was against white supremacy and what she saw as the emasculation of black men. She theorized that white people were the first people with albinism who were driven from Africa by the black natives.

== Criticisms ==
Welsing's beliefs surrounding melanin have been criticized as pseudoscientific. She claimed that melanin gives Black people supernatural powers such as extrasensory perception. She gave as an example George Washington Carver, saying that his melanin enabled plants to talk to him and reveal their nutritional qualities.

Welsing caused controversy after she said that homosexuality among African-Americans was a ploy by white males to decrease the black population, arguing that the emasculation of the black man was a means to prevent the procreation of black people.

== Personal life ==
In 1961, she met Johannes Kramer Welsing, a Ghanaian, while enrolled at Howard University Medical School. They eventually married but had no children.

== Film appearances ==
- Welsing appeared in the documentary 500 Years Later (2005), directed by Owen Alik Shahadah, and written by M. K. Asante.
- Welsing also appeared in Hidden Colors: The Untold History of People of Aboriginal, Moor, and African Descent, a 2011 documentary film by Tariq Nasheed.

== Works ==
- The Isis Papers: The Keys to the Colors, Chicago: Third World Press, c 1992 (3rd printing); ISBN 978-0-88378-103-6, ISBN 978-0-88378-104-3.
