= Lyle Ashton Harris =

American artist (born 1965)

- Born: February 6, 1965 (age 61); Bronx, New York
- Education: Wesleyan University 1988, BFA, California Institute of the Arts 1990, MFA; National Graduate Photography Seminar, Tisch School of the Arts 1990; Whitney Museum Independent Study Program 1992,
- Known for: Photography

Lyle Ashton Harris (born February 6, 1965) is an American artist who has cultivated a diverse artistic practice ranging from photographic media, collage, installation art and performance art. Harris uses his works to comment on societal constructs of sexuality and race, while exploring his own identity as a queer, black man.

== Early life ==
Born in the Bronx, Harris was mostly raised by his chemistry professor mother Rudean after she divorced Harris's father, between New York City and Dar Es Salaam, Tanzania. Harris has expressed the impact of the absence of his father as a large impact on his personal and emotional development, which would later be shown through some of his pieces, including his collaborations with his brother, Thomas Allen Harris. While in Dar Es Salaam, Harris and his brother were sent to an English-speaking Swahili school. Harris believed it was important to his development as both an artist and a black man to live in a country in which black people were in positions of power. He valued his time spent in Tanzania, as it was a sharp contrast to the school he attended in New York City.

Harris spent a lot of his childhood with his grandparents, including his maternal grandmother Joella, who he has featured in his art, was a missionary and his grandfather was a treasurer for Greater Bethel AME Church (Harlem, New York), which influenced many of Harris' pieces. Additionally, his grandfather had an extensive photograph archive, which can be connected to Harris' later experimentation with photography in his art.

During their youth in the early 1970s, Harris and his brother began to do drag on the weekends, in which they would perform in the hallway of their mother's home. This provided a safe space for the brothers to experiment with gender and their own personal sexual identity, something they feel is crucial to their artistic development. In addition to playing with gender and performance, Harris toyed with color and different functions of color. Growing up in the 1970s, there was a resurgence within the African American community in which exploration of African culture began to influence style and domestic culture. Harris used color to connect himself and his art back to these roots, as many in his community did at the time of his childhood.

== Academia and early works ==
=== Education ===
Harris originally decided to attend Wesleyan University with the intended major of Economics. During his second year there, he took a trip to Amsterdam to visit his brother that was living there at the time. In Amsterdam, Harris discovered a book by Allan Sekula, "Photography Against the Grain: Essays and Photo Works" that he believes drastically altered his ideas of self-development, changing the course of his life. Harris returned to the US and spent the following semester exploring NYC through the black clubbing scene of the 1980s. He took courses in the arts, returned to Wesleyan, came out as queer, and switched his major to art. In 1988, Harris graduated from Wesleyan University with a BFA.Harris received his MFA from the California Institute of the Arts and attended the National Graduate Photography Seminar at the Tisch School of the Arts in 1990. Following this time, Harris also participated in the Whitney Museum Independent Study Program in 1992.

=== Americas ===
According to art critic Maximilíano Duron, an emergence of self-realization within Harris sparked his first work titled "Americas" between 1987 and 1988. "Americas" is a black and white photography series in which Harris dresses in wigs and wears whiteface. Scholars, Kwame Appiah and Cassandra Coblentz, view "Americas" as Harris' discovery of both his voice as an artist, and as a man, while toying with blackface in reverse. Harris went on to attend the California Institute for the Arts and describes facing challenges there as one of the only students of color. After receiving feedback from a professor that his work was misunderstood by a white audience, he created a piece intended to command attention. This piece was Harris standing in a leopard bodysuit with a derogatory word referring to homosexuals painted in red lipstick at the bottom. Harris expresses that he used this piece to claim his identity, and reassume power over it, in a way that everyone could understand.

=== Constructs ===
Harris' struggle at CalArts inspired his work titled "Constructs". Constructs furthered the ideas of his previous work "Americas", as he aimed to showcase what it means to be a queer black man and accentuated the connection between sexuality and race. He dressed mainly in minstrel attire and used whiteface to critique the static aspects of culture in the US led by a white majority.

== Exhibitions ==
=== Whitney Museum Independent Study Program ===
Harris' first exhibition-style work was curated in 1992, in a series he created through the Whitney Museum Independent Study Program. The collection was a color-based series, in which he used the colors of the Pan-African flag and members of his family to display and create a narrative of black life that was proud and exuberant.

=== Black Male: Representations of Masculinity in Contemporary Art ===
In 1994, Harris was offered a solo exhibition in New York City by Jack Tilton featuring his earlier work, "Constructs", as part of the larger exhibition titled "Black Male: Representations of Masculinity in Contemporary American Art." Educator, Senam Okudzeto, considered Harris' work a marriage of the autobiographical and the historiographical, beautifully illustrating "identity politics". For Okudzeto, "Black Male" did not attempt to project inclusivity or disillusion viewers; "Black Male" encouraged viewers to think about blackness and masculinity as political powers in the culture of the United States.

=== The Good Life ===
In the fall of 1994, Harris exhibited The Good Life in New York where Barkley L. Hendricks also appeared, where Elizabeth Hess of The Village Voice said "the most brilliant pairing in the installation is achieved when Lyle Ashton Harris' seductive self-portraits meet Barkley L. Hendricks' tight paintings of black men. Harris dresses up in feminine costumes, challenging every construct of black macho, while Hendricks' dated, once fashionable portraits - a sports figure, a man in a fancy, full-length coat - support the pillars of masculinity...". The show was composed of large format Polaroids depicting staged and impromptu photographs of friends and family members. One of the most notable works from the show is a triptych series in collaboration with his brother, Thomas Allen Harris, entitled "Brotherhood, Crossroads, Etcetera". The work weaves a complex visual allegory that invokes ancient African cosmologies, Judeo-Christian myths, and taboo public and private desires.

Harris remained consistent in his ability to play with gender, sexuality and race in his art when he worked with Renée Cox in 1994. The two posed for Harris's polaroid piece, The Child. Cox poses as a father figure, embracing Harris as the mother figure, who holds a child as they both look into the camera. Harris maintains his color scheme of black, green, red, and yellow, which emphasize his connection to his African roots and culture. Green, he establishes as a symbol of the African race, and red as a symbol of blood. This color scheme was used for The Child, as well as his project Brotherhood, done with Thomas Allen Harris.

=== The Watering Hole ===
In 1996, "The Watering Hole", a photomontage series, reveals Harris' performative use of photography and its mechanisms, putting image into a field of representation where they reveal hidden or repressed occurrences. "The Watering Hole" was inspired by the criminal case involving Jeffrey Dahmer, a cannibalistic killer who had victims that were majority black and Latino boys. At this time, Harris was interested in black masculinity as it relates to vulnerability. He used newspaper clippings relevant to the case and incorporated his own photographs to create a collage that showed the transparency between men and their masculine identities. Harris found the idea of cannibalism in the case especially interesting as it described the process of one's "desire to consume the other".

=== Billie, Boxers, and Better Days ===
In 2002 Harris came out with his photo series called "Billie, Boxers, and Better Days." With this series, made up of polaroid prints of performative self-portraits, Harris aimed to depict the commodity of black bodies and the idea of gender as a result of repeated acts that create an identity that can be categorized. Throughout these works, Harris intends to reveal he has infinite relationships with his being and definitions of selfhood, even aligning himself with black femininity through Billie Holiday. In her essay on this, Amber Musser says, "Harris's citation of Holiday is not just about his relationship to her; it is also about black femininity and understanding the way it functions as a space of otherness within Harris's formulation of selfhood".

=== Blow Up ===
In 2004, "Blow Up", Harris's first public wall collage was shown at the Rhona Hoffman gallery in Chicago. Harris' work, "Blow Up" is a collage series centered around a piece Harris found in 2001 while he was a fellow at the American Academy in Rome. At the time, Harris was interested in racism and power dynamic in European Soccer. He was particularly focused on an image of a black man massaging an Italian soccer player's leg. This image became the focal point of the entire exhibition. Blow Up contains imagery depicting interpretations of race and sex across cultures and history, while illustrating their connectivity. This led to a series of three other wall collages composed of materials, photographs and ephemera Harris collected including, Blow UP IV (Sevilla) which was made for the Bienal de Arte Contemporeano de Sevilla in Seville, Spain in 2006.

=== Memoirs of Hadrian ===
In 2002, "Memoirs of Hadrian", a photomontage series pictures a young boxer in a non-traditional manner as he is slouched and bloodied rather than triumphant as many images of boxers were shown around that time. According to a Holland Cotter, a Pulitzer prize winning art critic, the title refers to "both to the city and to Marguerite Yourcenar's book of the same name, a fictional autobiography of the aging Roman emperor.".

=== Other exhibitions ===
In 2010 Gregory R. Miller & Co. published Excessive Exposure. The publication is the most definitive documentation of Harris' "Chocolate-Colored" portraits made with a large-format Polaroid camera over the past ten years.

In 2011, The Studio Museum in Harlem exhibited some of these portraits, highlighting specific individual subjects.

In 2013, the Zuckerman Museum of Art at Kennesaw State University presented Accra My Love, a solo exhibition of 14 works by Harris.

In 2014, he was also featured on the Independent Lens documentary Through a Lens Darkly: Black Photographers and the Emergence of a People produced by his brother Thomas Allen Harris. In 2000 and 2001, he was a Fellow at American Academy in Rome. In February 2015, he received the 2014 David C. Driskell Prize from the High Museum of Art and, later in May, he also spoke at the Contemporary African Art Fair at Pioneer Works Center For Art and Innovation.

Harris also co-curated with Robert Storr and Peter Benson Miller a group exhibition Nero su Bianco (Black on White), which was presented at the American Academy in Rome in 2015.

He has also been exhibited in places such as the Solomon R. Guggenheim Museum, Whitney Museum of American Art, Scottsdale Museum of Contemporary Art, Venice Biennale, Adamson Gallery, the Bruce High Quality Foundation University Gallery Cornell University, Neil L. and Angelica Rudenstine Gallery, W. E. B. Du Bois Institute, Harvard University, University of California at Santa Barbara, Museum of Art Fort Lauderdale and Center for the Arts, University at Buffalo, Andy Warhol Museum and Howard University Department of Art. and magazines such as New York, Vibe and The New York Times (the latter at which he was a photojournalist). Mickalene Thomas cited Harris as an influence of hers while Harris himself cited influences such as Caravaggio, Francis Bacon, Robert Mapplethorpe, Cindy Sherman and Jean-Michel Basquiat.

Lyle Ashton Harris's work is featured in the permanent collection of the Pérez Art Museum Miami, in Florida, and it was included in the 2026 group show This is America: Selections from PAMM's Collection, in commemoration of the United States 250 birthday.

Ashton Harris is represented by the Salon 94 in New York City. He currently lives in New York where is the assistant professor of art at New York University and formerly split his time between the New York and Accra, Ghana campuses.

== Recent works and critical reception ==
=== Teaching in Accra, Ghana ===
Through New York University's Global Program, between the years of 2005 and 2012, Harris taught in Accra, Ghana, and created work inspired by the political unrest surrounding visibility for the homosexual community. His works "Deceivers and Money Boys," 2013 and "Untitled (Colonial Law)," 2014, were influenced by the oppression of the homosexual community provoked by the media after British Prime Minister, David Cameron, revoked aid to African Countries with "anti-gay laws". Philosopher, Kwame Anthony Appiah, investigates the effects Harris' work in Ghana. Appiah believes Harris discovered a different relationship with gender roles there, for example white is more disconnected with race; Ghanaians apply white powder to their faces in ritualistic practice not for the purposes of whiteface. This interconnectivity of culture is exemplified by Harris' interpretation of a photo taken of Italian politician, Silvio Berlusconi, that was featured in the New York Times in the early 2000s. Harris layered the photo with motifs of from Ghanaian funerary clothe and Java prints to represent the history of trade between Dutch and West Africa.

=== Collage methodology ===
Collage has remained an integral part of Harris's studio practice since the mid-1990s. Harris' series in Ghana, as well as his early work "The Watering Hole", are examples of his thoughtful collaging. Throughout his works "Jamestown Prison Erasure," 2010, and "Untitled," he uses translucent fabrics and shadowy figures to represent the invisibility of the LGBTQ community in Accra, and the ongoing presence of racist structures passed down from the transatlantic slave trade. According to Cassandra Coblentz, collaging helps display the strong connection between photograph and identity that exists in Harris' work. She believes he uses collage to make straightforward imagery layered, creating movement within still photography.

=== Self-portraiture and masquerading ===
Harris commonly uses self-portraiture in many of his works and exhibitions, particularly his earlier works. James Smalls refers to Harris' self-portraits as photography that engages in investigations of social issues with a focus on disguise and masquerade on the surface. One of Harris' most recent works, "Flash of the Spirit" is a mask-based series inspired by Robert Farris Thompson's book titled, Flash of the Spirit.For this series, Harris uses masks collected by his uncle who traveled through West Africa in the 1960s that he felt represented a connection to his childhood. "Flash of the Spirit" was shot in Provincetown, Fire Island, a typically white occupied vacation spot. Jeff Elstone of Vulture magazine reports that Harris did so to ignite the African diaspora in those environments through photographs that connect with the inherent queerness Harris sees in Africanism.

== Publications ==
- Cassel Oliver, Valerie, et al. Radical Presence: Black Performance in Contemporary Art. Contemporary Arts Museum Houston, 2013.
- Ashton Harris, Lyle, et al. Lyle Ashton Harris. Published by Gregory R. Miller & Co. in collaboration with CRG Gallery, 2003.
