= Thomas Allen Harris =

American filmmaker

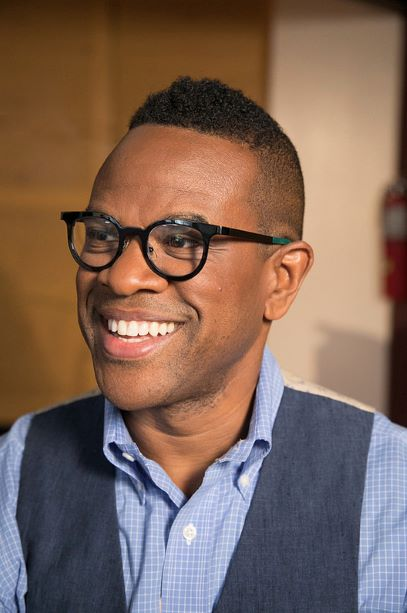
- Born: Thomas Allen Harris; 1962 (age 63–64); United States
- Education: Harvard University
- Occupations: Film director, Producer
- Known for: Documentary work
- Notable work: Twelve Disciples of Nelson Mandela (2005); Through a Lens Darkly (2014)
- Relatives: Lyle Ashton Harris (brother); Thomas Allen Harris Sr. (father); Benjamin Pule Leinaeng (stepfather)

Thomas Allen Harris is an American interdisciplinary artist who explores family, identity, and spirituality in a participatory practice. Since 1990, Harris has remixed archives from multiple origins throughout his work, challenging hierarchy within historical narratives through the use of documentary and research methodologies that center vernacular image and collaboration. He is currently a professor of film and media studies and African-American studies at Yale University.

His most recent project is the television show Family Pictures USA, which examines neighborhoods and cities of the United States through the lens of family photographs, collaborative performances, and personal testimony sourced from their communities.

== Early life and education ==
Harris was born in 1962. He was raised in the Bronx. His brother is artist Lyle Ashton Harris. His stepfather was South African activist Benjamin Pule Leinaeng. He spent part of his childhood in Tanzania, where he attended a local school.

Harris graduated from Harvard University with a biology degree in 1984. Although initially planning to go to medical school, he fell in love with film while on a fellowshipin Europe.

== Career ==
Harris’ participatory practice grew out of deeply collaborative work he engaged in early in his career with a vanguard of queer filmmakers of color, including Cheryl Dunye, Ellis Haizlip, Yvonne Welbon, Raul Ferrera Balanquet, Shari Frilot, and Marlon Riggs.

As a staff producer for WNET (New York’s PBS affiliate) on their show THE ELEVENTH HOUR, Harris produced public television segments around HIV/AIDS activism and its intersection with the culture wars from 1987-1991. In 1990, he curated the first New York/San Francisco Gay and Lesbian Town Hall meeting, a three-hour public television event which culminated in the broadcast of Marlon Riggs’ Tongues Untied. In 1997, Harris and 6 other queer filmmakers of color produced a document titled Narrating Our History: A Dialogue Among Queer Media Artists From the African Diaspora. This piece has been published in Sisters in the Life: A History of Out African American Lesbian Media-Making (2018, ed. Yvonne Welbon and Alexandra Juhasz).

Harris’ deeply personal and experimental films have received critical acclaim at international film/art festivals such as Sundance, Berlin, Toronto, Tribeca, FESPACO, Outfest, Flaherty, Cape Town, and the Melbourne Art Festival, and have broadcast on POV American documentary series on PBS, AfroPOP, the Sundance Channel, ARTE, as well as CBC, Swedish broadcasting Network, and New Zealand Television. The films include: Twelve Disciples of Nelson Mandela (2005), a story of the anti apartheid movement told through personal testimonies, archival material, and a cast of first time South African actors engaging with the archive; É Minha Cara/That’s My Face (2001), a mythopoetic journey shot completely on Super 8mm film by three generations of Harris’ family on three continents; and VINTAGE - Families of Value (1995), a mosaic portrait of Black families created by handing the camera to three groups of queer siblings, including Harris and his brother Lyle Ashton Harris. These films re-interpreted the idea of documentary, autobiography, and personal archive through their innovative use of community participation.

In 2009, Harris and his team founded Digital Diaspora Family Reunion (DDFR), a transmedia project that explores and shares the narratives found within family photo albums. Working in partnership with museums, festivals, senior and youth centers, educational institutions, libraries, and cultural arts spaces, DDFR organizes workshops, performances, and exhibitions that create communal linkages affirming our common humanity while privileging the voices of people whose stories have often been absented, marginalized or overlooked. The project was developed in tandem with Harris’ 2014 film Through A Lens Darkly: Black Photographers and the Emergence of a People, in which leading Black cultural figures, scholars, and photographers share their archives with Harris in an exploration of the ways photography has been used as a tool of representation and self-representation in history. The film premiered on Independent Lens on PBS in 2015 and was nominated for a National Emmy and a Peabody Award. The film won the 2015 NAACP Image Award for Outstanding Documentary film, the Fund for Santa Barbara Social Justice Award, and an Africa Movie Academy Award, among others.

In 2019, he launched Family Pictures USA , a television series following narratives in family photos.

Harris lectures widely on visual literacy and the use of media as a tool for social change. His media appearances include C-SPAN, the Tavis Smiley Show, NPR, Metrofocus, AriseTV, and a TEDx Talk. He has curated for Gay and Lesbian film festivals including Mix and Outfest.

=== Academia ===
He held a tenured position as Associate Professor of Media Arts at the University of California, San Diego. He was a Visiting Professor of Film and New Media at Sarah Lawrence College.

He joined the faculty of Yale University as a Senior Lecturer in African American and Film & Media Studies. He later became a professor.

== Personal life ==
Harris is gay.

== Filmography ==
Title	Year	Awards
VINTAGE - Families of Value	1995	Best Documentary at the Atlanta Film Festival; Golden Gate Award at the San Francisco International Film Festival
É Minha Cara/That's My Face	2001	Best Documentary at OutFest; Prize of the Ecumenical Jury of Christian Churches at the Berlin International Film Festival
Twelve Disciples of Nelson Mandela	2005	Best Documentary at the Pan-African Film Festival; Best Documentary at the Santa Cruz Film Festival; Henry Hampton Award for Excellence in Documentary Filmmaking at the Roxbury Film Festival
Through a Lens Darkly: Black Photographers and the Emergence of a People	2014	NAACP Image Award for Outstanding Documentary; Fund for Santa Barbara 2014 Social Justice Award; Best Diasporic Documentary Award from the Africa Movie Academy Awards in Nigeria

== Television ==
- Family Pictures USA (2019)

== Awards ==
Harris is a recipient of numerous awards and fellowships including a Tribeca Film Institute's Nelson Mandela Award, and United States Artist Award, Guggenheim Fellowship, Rockefeller Fellowship, as well as CPB/PBS and Sundance Directors Fellowships.
