= Tariq Nasheed =

American media personality and film producer

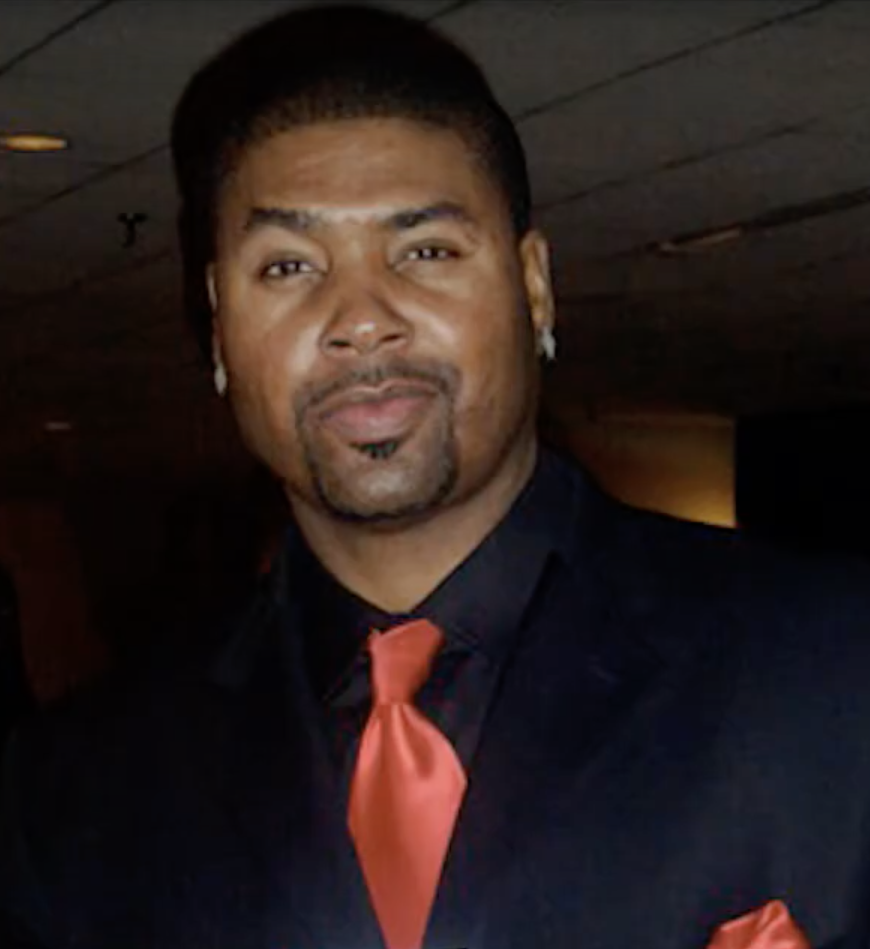
- Nasheed in 2016
- Born: Detroit, Michigan, U.S.
- Other names: Tariq Elite; King Flex; K-Flex
- Occupations: Author; film producer; social media commentator; musician
- Known for: Hidden Colors film series
- Spouse: Alexis Cobb (m. 2014)
- Children: 4
- Website: officialfba.com

Tariq Nasheed is an American film producer and internet personality. He is best known for his Hidden Colors film series, as well as his commentary and promotion of conspiracy theories on social media. He coined the English-language term "Foundational Black American" (FBA) in January 2019, to describe descendants of Africans enslaved in the United States.

== Early life ==
Nasheed was born in Detroit, Michigan, and spent most of his youth in Birmingham, Alabama.

== Career ==
In 1991, Nasheed moved to Los Angeles, where he began his career as a rapper and later as a dating expert under the "K-Flex" persona, before transitioning into documentary filmmaking. Many of his dating books give instructions on how to be a pickup artist.

In 2000, Nasheed had his first acting credit in the mockumentary TV series The Awful Truth by Michael Moore in the second-season episode "Taxi Driver", where he interviewed politicians in Washington, D.C. about allegations of taking money from lobbyists, including Mark Pfeifle, who served as deputy communications director to then-presidential candidate George W. Bush, U.S. representative Tom Lantos, and political campaigner Nick Nyhart of Every Voice.

Nasheed produced the 2011 documentary film Hidden Colors: The Untold History of People of Aboriginal, Moor, and African Descent. Nasheed's follow-up film and DVD, Hidden Colors 2: The Triumph of Melanin, was released in 2012.

In 2013, Nasheed released the horror film The Eugenist, which he also wrote and directed. In 2014, he released Hidden Colors 3: The Rules of Racism and co-produced Da Sweet Blood of Jesus (a remake of the 1973 movie Ganja & Hess) with director Spike Lee.

In 2015, Nasheed was an associate producer in the short documentary film Wilmington on Fire, about the 1898 Wilmington massacre.

In 2023 Nasheed opened the Hidden History Museum in Los Angeles. The museum features current and historical Black figures.

=== Mink Slide ===
Nasheed is the lead singer of the R&B musical group Mink Slide, which debuted in 2018. Mink Slide's first album, Egyptian Musk, debuted at number 12 on the Billboard R&B Albums chart.

== Views and reception ==
Nasheed is known online for his controversial commentary on race. He is a proponent of "Foundational Black Americans" (FBA), an ideology and ethnic identity he founded, which is defined as, "any person classified as Black, who can trace their bloodline lineage back to the American system of slavery. To be designated as an FBA, at least one parent must come from a non-immigrant background in The United States of America." Nasheed believes FBAs must "seek out reparations for their own" and that American-born descendants of the American slave trade have not adequately sought out resources for themselves.

Nasheed is known for his use of the term "bed wench" and the related term "Negro bed wench mentality". He uses the term to refer to black women who date interracially. He revived and popularized use of this term, which historically was used to disparage black women who were raped by their masters during slavery. Ebony Magazine described Nasheed's conception of the term "bed wench" as a put-down of successful black women who challenge the institutions of black patriarchy. Nasheed also uses the term "buck breaking" to refer to the sexual abuse of Black men, particularly in the context of slavery, via a documentary of the same name, which MEL Magazine described as containing "uncooked nonsense" and being largely inaccurate.

According to Refinery29, Nasheed "is notorious for his misogynistic, queerphobic, xenophobic and often ahistorical commentary on Blackness in America." Stephen Kearse in The New York Times Magazine refers to Nasheed as a "conspiracy buff".

During the COVID-19 pandemic, Nasheed was highly vocal about his distrust of the COVID-19 vaccine. He opined that, "they are using yet another Black, non-FBA doctor to do the #CovidVaccine experiment on today...Notice no one has given a scientific reason as to why we are only seeing Black people injected with this new vaccine" and that the "white powers in control" completely ignored requests for "reparations, decent employment, decent education, decent housing, no police killings."

=== 2018 swatting incident ===
In May 2018, Nasheed and his family were swatted by white nationalists while in his home in Los Angeles. Several calls were made to the Los Angeles Police Department (LAPD) falsely claiming that Nasheed had kidnapped and tied up his wife and had planted bombs in the house, which prompted an armed police response. Nasheed commended the LAPD for handling the situation professionally.

== Personal life ==
In 2014, Nasheed married Alexis "Peanut" Cobb. He has three children with her, as well as a daughter from a previous marriage.

== Books ==
- The Art of Mackin' (Research Associates School Times Publications, 2000) ISBN 0971135339
- Play or Be Played: What Every Female Should Know About Men, Dating, and Relationships (Simon & Schuster, 2004) ISBN 1439188769
- The Mack' Within (Riverhead Freestyle, 2005) ISBN 144062514X
- The Art of Gold Digging (G.D. Publishing, 2008) ISBN 0971135320
- The Elite Way: 10 Rules Men Must Know in Order to Deal with Women (King Flex Entertainment, 2010) ISBN 0971135347
- Foundational Black American Race Baiter: My Journey into Understanding Systematic Racism (King Flex Entertainment, 2021) ISBN 098310493X

== Filmography ==
- Hidden Colors (2011)
- Hidden Colors 2 (2012)
- The Eugenist (2013)
- Hidden Colors 3 (2014)
- Buck Breaking (2021)
