= Umar Johnson =

American Afrocentrist psychologist and activist

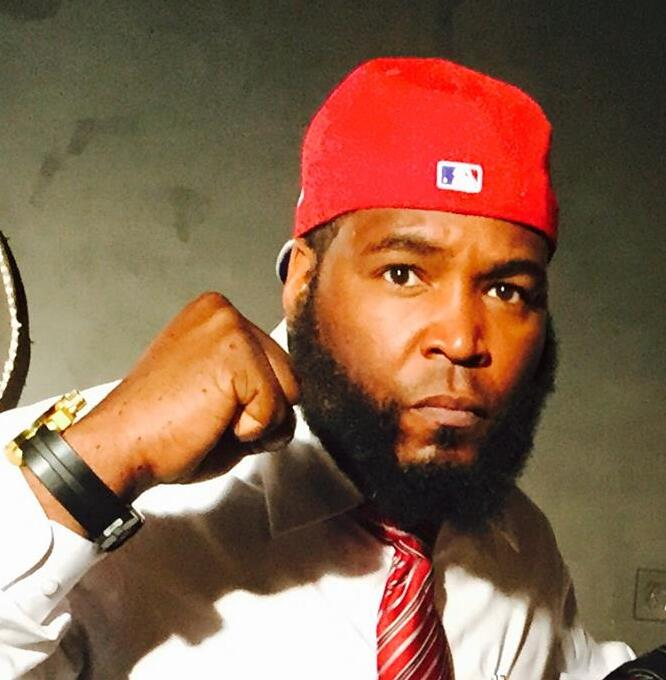
- Johnson in 2015
- Born: Jermaine Shoemake; August 21, 1974 (age 52); Philadelphia, Pennsylvania, U.S.
- Citizenship: United States; Ghana
- Education: Millersville University of Pennsylvania (BA); Philadelphia College of Osteopathic Medicine (MBA, PsyD)
- Occupations: Motivational speaker; author; polemist
- Children: 3

Academic background
- Thesis: The Relationship between Self-Concept and Academic Achievement in African American Middle School Students: A Correlational Study (2010)
- Doctoral advisor: Robert A. DiTomasso
- Influences: Garvey; Fanon; Nkrumah

Academic work
- Discipline: Educational psychology
- Notable works: Psycho-Academic Holocaust: The Special Education & ADHD Wars Against Black Boys (2013); Black Parent Advocate: The Art of War for Dealing with America's Public & Charter Schools (2020)
- Website: www.drumarjohnson.com

Umar Rashad Ibn Abdullah-Johnson (born Jermaine Shoemake; August 21, 1974), known professionally as Dr. Umar, is an American motivational speaker and author. Johnson has referred to himself as the "prince of Pan-Africanism".

== Early life and education ==
Johnson is a native of North Philadelphia. He earned a Bachelor of Arts from Millersville University. He later attended the Philadelphia College of Osteopathic Medicine, where he earned an MBA in 2009 and a Psy.D. in clinical psychology in 2012.

== Career ==
=== Book and documentary appearance ===
In 2011, he was featured on Hidden Colors: The Untold History of People of Aboriginal, Moor, and African Descent, directed by Tariq Nasheed. In 2013, Johnson self-published Psycho-Academic Holocaust: The Special Education & ADHD Wars Against Black Boys, a book in which he contended that attention deficit hyperactivity disorder (ADHD) was increasingly misdiagnosed in Black communities and that the American education system used ADHD to stigmatize black children. In a 2017 video clip, Johnson claimed that ADHD and learning disabilities do "not exist".

=== Social media commentary, activism, and controversies ===
Johnson is most known for his commentary, and his provocative remarks over the years, mostly on race.

In 2018, Johnson said that his main Facebook and GoFundMe accounts had been shut down, but that his Instagram—then with 342,000 followers—remained active. His Instagram following had risen to 789,000 by late 2021; at that time he also had 163,000 Twitter followers.

Johnson characterizes his commentary as pan-Africanist (which Johnson renders as "Pan-Afrikanist"); he has called for Black-Americans to identify with African people globally rather than with individual religions, nationalities, professions, and fraternal organizations. He referred to himself on his website as the "prince of Pan-Africanism". He engaged in a Twitter feud with Feminista Jones, a Philadelphia-based black feminist commentator and activist. He has criticized Black Americans for celebrating Independence Day. He has denounced various Black public figures, including actor Jonathan Majors—for dating a white woman, college football coach Deion Sanders—for leaving the historically black Jackson State to coach at Colorado, and Oprah Winfrey—for being identified with feminism and LGBTQ rights.

In speech and social media posts, Johnson is accused of promoting misinformation, including a viral Instagram post falsely claiming that billionaire Bill Gates sought for "at least 3 billion people" to die as part of a population control scheme. It is claimed that Johnson has also baselessly accused the Population Council and Planned Parenthood of "using homosexuality as a population control strategy in the black community".

Johnson criticized former President Barack Obama, claiming that his administration "gave my civil rights over to the LGBTQ, [...] the feminist movement, [...] [and] the Mexicans". In various speeches, Johnson also criticized President Joe Biden, contending that he had not done enough to protect Black people from police violence. In a 2023 interview on The Breakfast Club radio show, Johnson discouraged Black people from voting, said he had not voted for many years, and described the Democratic Party as "a White, racist institution" that "is just as racist as the Republican Party". In a 2023 interview on Joe Budden's The Joe Budden Podcast, Johnson criticized Black people who believed that Eminem was the greatest rapper of all time, asserting that it "speaks to how psychologically ill we are as a race of people" and "No non-African can ever be the best of anything African. It's an insult to the ancestors. It's an insult to the race".

In 2025, Johnson obtained Ghanaian citizenship.

In social media posts, Johnson has criticized interracial marriage, opposed same-sex marriage, and promoted various conspiracy theories. In January 2020, after the death of Kobe Bryant, Johnson suggested that the helicopter was sabotaged as part of an assassination attempt ordered by the NBA and the pharmaceutical industry. In 2020, after NFL player DeSean Jackson was disciplined for making antisemitic Instagram posts, Johnson suggested that Jackson's views were valid and that he should not apologize for them. In May 2021, Johnson criticized Kevin Samuels claiming that he was "slandering and criticizing Black women who don’t emulate Euro-centric standards of beauty and success". In September 2021, he hosted an Instagram Live where he married two women. This was later revealed to be a fake marriage.

=== Claim to be a Frederick Douglass relative ===
Johnson has repeatedly claimed to have a familial connection with Frederick Douglass, often claiming to be a "blood relative" of the 19th-century abolitionist and civil rights leader.

=== 2018 Pennsylvania State Board of Psychology hearing ===
In December 2017, Johnson was ordered to attend a hearing before the Pennsylvania State Board of Psychology the following month. He faced charges of engaging in the practice of psychology without a license. In defense, Johnson denied that he had ever claimed to be a psychologist.

== Reception ==
Many people have criticized Johnson, including commentators in the magazines The Root and TheGrio. South African commentator Khanya Mtshali, writing in a 2022 op-ed in the South African newspaper Mail & Guardian, likened Johnson to Louis Farrakhan and said that both men "trafficked in a goofy performance of pan-Africanism". Anwar Curtis, an opinion contributor to The Patriot-News, defended Johnson, describing him in a 2017 op-ed as a "noted conservative and Afro-centric thinker" and "dedicated [...] vessel for his people".

Various observers, including The Root commentators, have called Johnson a "hotep", a term that refers to a grouping of Afro-centric commentators who espouse a mixture of black radicalism and social conservatism. However, Molefi Kete Asante argues that Johnson lacks a grasp of Afro-centric academic theory and philosophy and thus cannot be termed Afro-centric.

He was referenced in a comedy skit in the "Weekend Update" parody newscast segment of NBC's Saturday Night Live (SNL) on May 16, 2026.

== See also ==
- Black supremacy
- Afrocentrism
- Anti-White racism
- Racism in the United States
- Race relations
