= Dark Medicine =

- Film poster
- Directed by: Tariq Nasheed
- Written by: Tariq Nasheed; Aaron Strongoni
- Produced by: Tariq Nasheed; Ola Akinroluyo; Rod Teddy Jones; Chris Mccoy
- Starring: Emily Brooks; Joshua Bednarsky; Russ Kingston
- Cinematography: Michele Lombardo; Morgan Schmidt
- Edited by: David Groves
- Release date: 2013
- Running time: 72 minutes
- Country: United States
- Language: English

Dark Medicine (originally known as The Eugenist) is a 2013 American horror film produced, written and directed by Tariq Nasheed.

== Plot ==
A group of college students break into an abandoned school to explore it. Once inside, they find that the school is not completely abandoned thanks to a eugenics program gone horribly wrong.

== Reception ==
Horrornews.net, giving the movie 2 tombstones out of 5, said, " Fans of teen horror flicks with a twist may want to give it a try. A climatic end that will surprise most is worth a look in its own right." On the other hand, Nav Qateel writing in Influx magazine gave the movie a D+, writing, "There wasn’t a single thing in this uncostly, unscary, rather short movie which spoke of hidden talent."
