= Red Tail Squadron =

American non-profit organization

- Logo prior to 2011
- Purpose: History of the Tuskegee Airmen
- Location(s): 971 Hallstrom Drive; Red Wing, Minnesota 55066
- Origins: The Commemorative Air Force (CAF) Red Tail Squadron
- Method: Exhibition
- Website: CAF Red Tail Squadron

The Red Tail Squadron, part of the non-profit Commemorative Air Force (CAF), known as the Red Tail Project until June 2011, maintains and flies a World War II era North American P-51C Mustang. The twice-restored aircraft flies to create interest in the history and accomplishments of the members of the World War II-era 332nd Fighter Group, also known as the Tuskegee Airmen, whose distinctive red markings on the tails of the P-51s they flew during that war, gave the organization its name.

The all African American 332d Fighter Group originally flew 15,550 sorties as bomber escorts in the Mustang; eventually the Airmen, who were originally shunned in the white military, acquired the right to fly combat missions. In 1970, the Commemorative Air Force acquired an original P-51 to include in their educational program. In 1980, Don Hinz took charge of the aircraft's restoration, and developed the idea of the Red Tail Project, named for the distinctive red paint on the Airmen's aircraft. Originally conceived as a restoration project, Red Tail evolved into an education program. Although the P-51 was restored, mechanical failure caused a crash and the death of the pilot, a retired U.S. Navy commander; the Tuskegee Airmen endorsed and encouraged the aircraft's second restoration, and the newly restored P-51C made its debut at AirVenture 2009 in Oshkosh, Wisconsin.

Since the 1990s, the Red Tail Squadron has raised over $2 million (US) for the aircraft's two restorations, its ongoing maintenance and associated educational programs. The Mustang has been featured in two documentary films: Red Tail Reborn, and Flight of the Red Tail.

== The Tuskegee Airmen ==
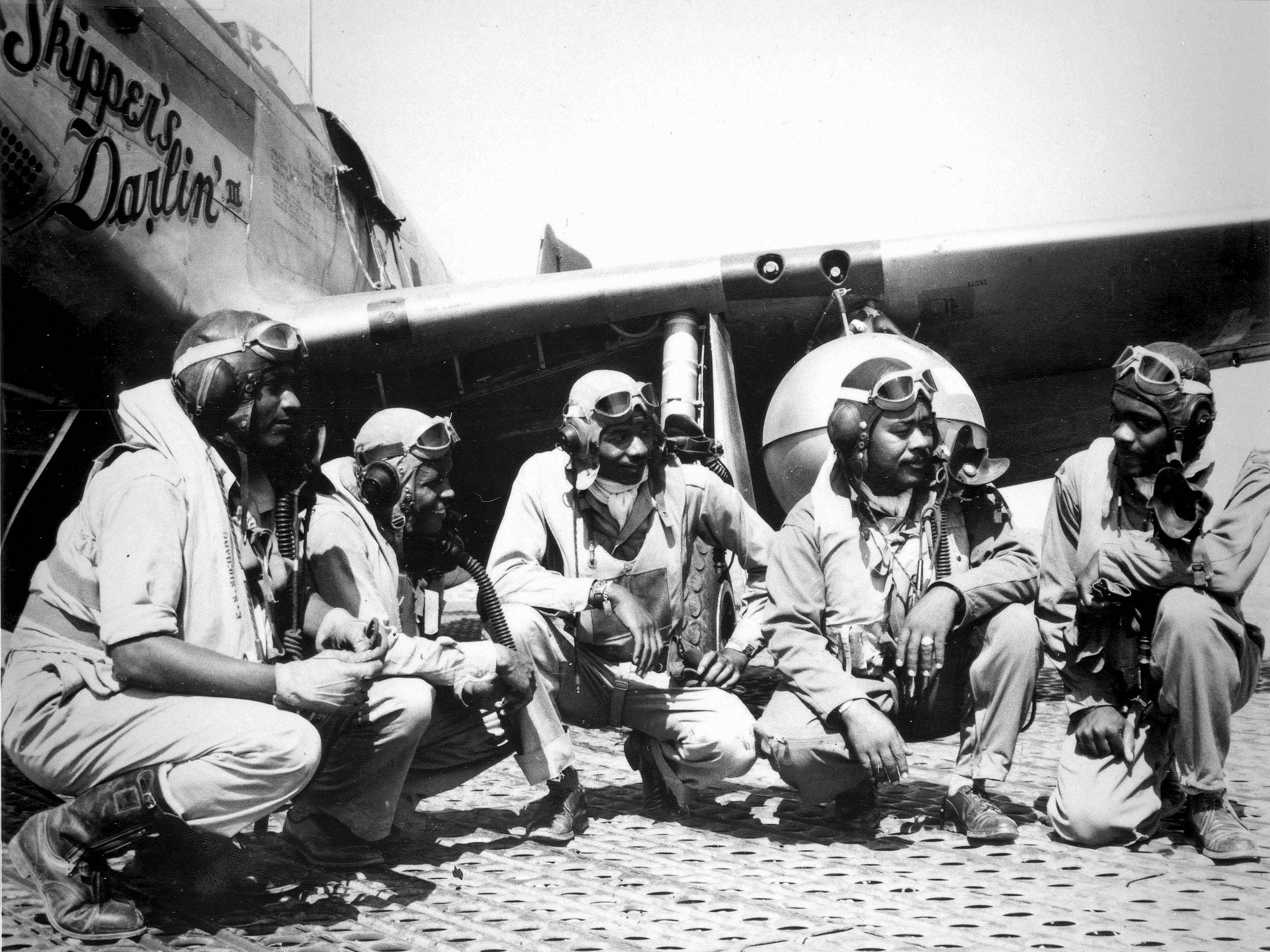
Pilots of the 332nd Fighter Group, known as Tuskegee Airmen, at Ramitelli Airfield, Italy

Tuskegee Airmen is the popular name of a group of African American pilots who fought in World War II as the 332nd Fighter Group and 477th Bombardment Group of the US Army Air Corps. They are also sometimes referred to as the Red Tail Angels or Red Tails, unofficial terms that were used during the War to describe the mostly unknown group of Airmen because of the distinctive red paint used on the tails of their fighter aircraft. The Tuskegee Airmen were the first unit of African American military aviators in the United States armed forces. During World War II, African Americans were still subjected to Jim Crow laws in portions of the United States and the American military itself was racially segregated. Legal and social prejudice prevented the Airmen from flying combat missions. Despite their adversities, the Tuskegee Airmen flew with distinction: In 2007, 350 Tuskegee Airmen and their widows were awarded a collective Congressional Gold Medal, and the airfield where they trained has been designated as Tuskegee Airmen National Historic Site. Although some sources claimed the Airmen had a perfect record in their 15,000 missions as bomber escorts, a report released in 2007 stated they lost 25 bombers.

== P-51C Mustang Tuskegee Airmen ==
P-51C Mustang Tuskegee Airmen
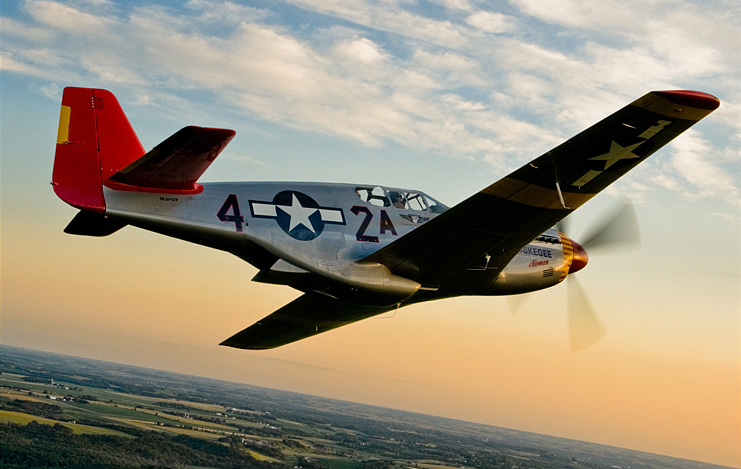
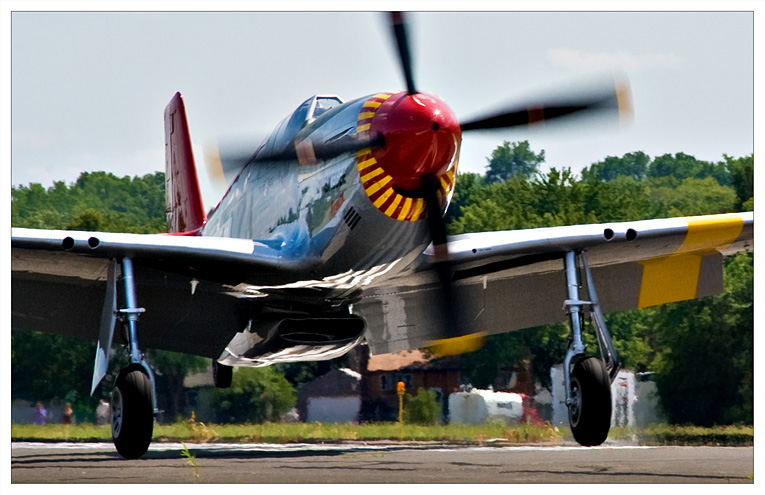
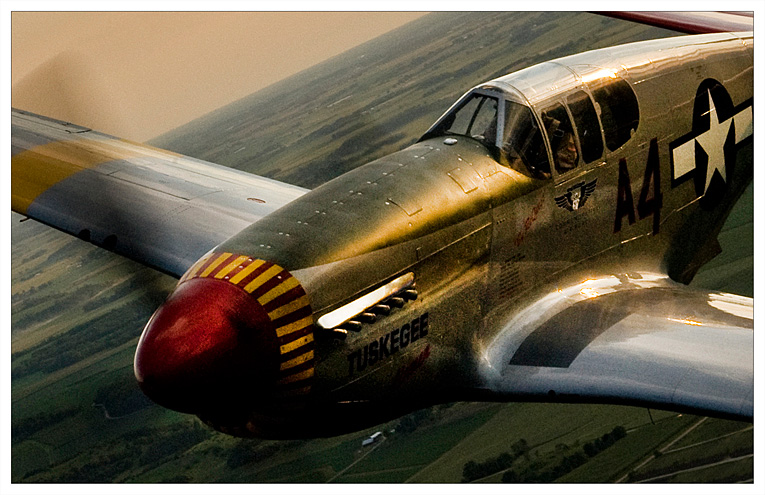
Images of "Tuskegee Airmen", a restored World War II P-51 Mustang flown by the CAF Red Tail Squadron

At the conclusion of World War II in 1945, the United States Army sold off military surplus and for $1 ($17.9 today) Montana State University in Bozeman, Montana bought a P-51C aircraft, which it parked on its campus in front of the engineering building. The P-51C was essentially left alone in Montana, except for an occasional coat of silver paint. In 1965, when the University wanted to add a parking lot, restorer Lloyd Creek bought it from the University for $1, provided that he could remove it from the campus in 24 hours of notification in winning the bid. To move the P-51C promptly to Billings, Montana necessitated the removal of the wings, which were sawed off with a circular saw. When the aircraft arrived in Billings, the wings were reattached to the fuselage.

In 1970, frustrated with restoration efforts, Creek donated the P-51C to the CAF, which disassembled the aircraft and shipped it to the organization's home base in Texas. While awaiting restoration, the aircraft endured a hurricane which exposed numerous parts of the aircraft to seawater damage. Several CAF volunteers attempted to rehab the aircraft in Minneapolis, Minnesota, Texas, Council Bluffs, Iowa, and finally in the late 1980s at the home of the Southern Minnesota wing of the CAF, which had just completed the restoration of the North American B-25 Mitchell bomber, Miss Mitchell. After noting the P-51C was in need of restoration, Don Hinz channeled his energy and talents into the emerging Red Tail project. The aircraft is now one of only four existing P-51C Mustangs in existence. As one of the four flying Mustangs, it is worth $2.5 million.

== History ==
The Commemorative Air Force, which has approximately 9,000 members and a fleet of 156 aircraft, is an educational association with the purpose to pay tribute to American military aviation through flight, exhibition and remembrance. It has been collecting, restoring and flying vintage historical aircraft for more than half a century. In the 1990s, the CAF's Minnesota Wing began restoring a P-51 that many branches of the CAF organization had attempted to restore but found the task beyond their capabilities. The P-51C once served Capt. Andrew "Jug" Turner. Pilot Don Hinz, a retired United States Navy commander based at Fleming Field in South St. Paul, Minnesota, heard of the project and enlisted some experts as well as named the effort "The Red Tail Project".

Originally, the restoration was attempted at Fleming Field. After soliciting the assistance of outside contractors from North Dakota, the aircraft was airborne in May 2001. The P-51C, which was named "Tuskegee Airmen", was included in numerous air shows to tell the history of the pilot group. From May 2001 to May 2004, the aircraft flew before more than an estimated three million people. By 2004, Hinz envisioned an educational program based on the restored aircraft. In a May 2004 show in Red Wing, Minnesota the camshaft drive of the Rolls-Royce Merlin engine failed. Although Hinz successfully landed the aircraft between two houses in a residential suburb, both wings were ripped off and the body was badly damaged. A tree damaged in the crash fell on Hinz, causing head trauma from which he did not recover.

The Tuskegee Airmen decided to restore the aircraft. The five-year restoration occurred at Tri-State Aviation in Wahpeton, North Dakota. In 2007, Gerry Beck, one of the primary restorers, was in a fatal collision of his P-51A and a P-51D during AirVenture 2007. Beck was the owner of Tri-State Aviation, but about a half dozen other CAF volunteer aviation mechanics contributed to the effort to pick up where he left off. The rebuilding continued with the mounting of the engine in 2008 and the mating of the wing in 2009. On 22 July 2009, four days before AirVenture 2009 in Oshkosh, Wisconsin, the P-51C had its first flight. Then, it was flown to Wisconsin for its public debut. After the show it returned to Minnesota with a 6 AT-6 escort. The aircraft has also served a tribute via military flyovers for fallen Tuskegee Airmen.

In 2011, the volunteer-driven organization changed its name from the "Red Tail Project" to the "CAF Red Tail Squadron" and also completed construction of the RISE ABOVE Traveling Exhibit as an additional tool to help tell the story of these pilots and their support personnel (who are also known as Tuskegee Airmen). The Mustang and the RISE ABOVE Traveling Exhibit appear together at air shows, and the Traveling Exhibit also goes to schools and other youth-oriented venues.

== Documentary ==
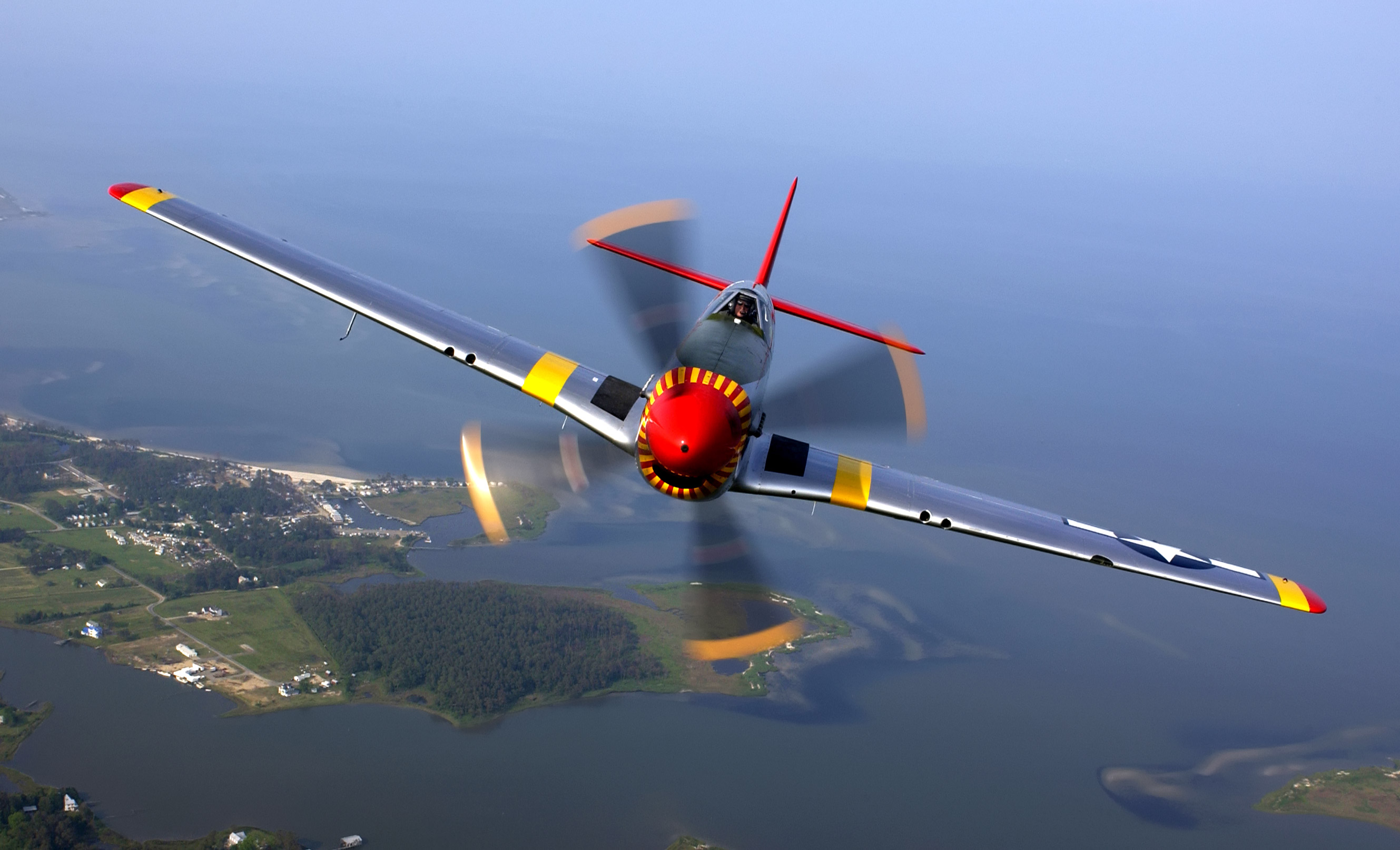
P-51 in a heritage flight over Langley Air Force Base

After the 2004 crash, the restoration became the impetus for a nationwide fund raising effort and attracted the attention of Adam White, an independent film maker who was, at the time, filming a documentary on vintage aircraft restoration called The Restorers. He was attracted to both the aircraft and the cause, and his 2007 historical documentary, Red Tail Reborn won Emmy Award recognition in his home state of Ohio, where it was first broadcast in February 2007, and, subsequently released on DVD in March of that year. Narrated by Michael Dorn of Star Trek fame, himself a pilot and warbird owner, the film documents the difficulties of the restoration of the P-51C and the travails of the Tuskegee Airmen. The following year PBS picked up the film in its Black History Month programming. White also completed a sequel, Flight of the Red Tail, a 12-minute film released in 2009.

The restoration, completed in 2009, cost $1 million. In 2005, the Red Tail Project, which is not for profit, sought to raise about $2 million to fund the initial restoration. The organization held several types of events to raise funds. Since then, community-based organizations adopted the project. For example, in Wahpeton, North Dakota, where the aircraft was restored, each August, the "Red Tail Run" is held. This motorcycle and vehicle run, which starts at the Harry Stern Airport, raises money for the project. In 2008, the organization hired Fund Raising Strategies, a fund raising specialist firm, to develop a direct mail fund raising program.

== Educational resources ==
The CAF Red Tail Squadron endeavors to preserve the legacy of the airmen through aviation education. In addition to the P-51C Mustang Tuskegee Airmen the Squadron RISE ABOVE Traveling Exhibit, utilized for tours and private showings for schools and groups around the country, the Squadron curates and provides educational resources for interested persons. These resources include a "Virtual Museum" which is an online repository of items belonging to or used by Tuskegee Airmen, including a catalogue of public memorials and artwork.

The "RISE ABOVE Traveling Exhibit" was introduced at EAA AirVenture 2011. It consists of a 53-foot (16.2 m) long semi trailer and tractor. The trailer, which has colorful graphics on all four sides, has expandable sides and houses a 40-foot (12.2 m) long, curved IMAX movie screen plus comfortable seating for 30 guests; it is also climate controlled. An original IMAX movie called RISE ABOVE, developed and filmed specifically for the Red Tail Squadron and the unique movie screen, is shown. The traveling exhibit goes to air shows with the Red Tail Project Mustang and spends 40 weeks per year at schools and places where young people congregate. The idea is to take the story of the Tuskegee Airmen, and how they overcame so many obstacles by setting goals and working to meet them, directly to the students who can benefit from hearing about the Airmen's experiences. The RISE ABOVE Traveling Exhibit is sponsored by the Texas Flying Legends Museum.
