= Thomas Cripps (film historian) =

American film historian (1932–2018)

- Born: September 17, 1932; Baltimore, Maryland
- Died: September 17, 2018 (aged 86); Baltimore, Maryland
- Occupation: Historian

Thomas R. Cripps (September 17, 1932 – September 17, 2018) was a professor at Morgan State University in Baltimore who wrote and lectured about the history of African American cinema.

== Early life and education ==
Cripps was born on September 17, 1932, in Baltimore, Maryland to Benjamin and Marian Cripps. He attended the Baltimore Polytechnic Institute and was part of the school's JV and Varsity soccer and baseball teams. Cripps pitched for the baseball team and joined them for the 1951 state championship, after his graduation in 1950. His skill brought him to the attention of a scout for the Brooklyn Dodgers.

Cripps went on to attend Towson University, where he graduated in 1954 with a bachelor's degree in secondary education, followed by a Master's and PhD at the University of Maryland, College Park in the cultural history of the United States. For his dissertation Cripps wrote "The Lily White Republicans: The Party, the Negro, and the South in the age of Booker T. Washington".

== Career ==
=== Teaching ===
Cripps took several teaching positions after graduating from Towson. While teaching at the University of North Carolina at Pembroke, Cripps and his wife received warning that the Ku Klux Klan planned on attacking him, as they were opposed to him teaching people of the Lumbee Nation. He went on to teach at Morgan State University was a visiting professor at Stanford, Harvard, and the University of Delaware, and was an adjunct professor at the University of Maryland in College Park and Johns Hopkins University.

During his time at Morgan State University Cripps coordinated the University Television Project, assisting in the production of approximately 40 programs on African-American life and culture and was a consultant to Turner Classic Movies. He was appointed Professor Emeritus in 1996 at Morgan State University, a position he held until his death in 2018.

=== Film ===
Cripps provided academic and scholarly research to multiple documentaries and was the writer for the documentary film Black Shadows on the Silver Screen. His research on the history of African American cinema has been viewed as groundbreaking and poet Thomas Sayers Ellis penned and dedicated a poem to Cripps, which he named after Cripps's 1977 book Slow Fade to Black.

== Honors and awards ==
Cripps was a Fellow at the National Humanities Center from 1980 to 1981, focusing on the topic "A Social History of Blacks in American Film, 1942 to the Present". Prior to this he was awarded the 1962 George Hammond history prize for a paper he wrote on his studies of the critical black reaction to the 1915 film The Birth of a Nation by D. W. Griffith. In 1982 Cripps received the Charles Thompson Prize from the Organization of American Historians and the National Archives of the United States.

After his death his papers and research materials were deposited in the Archive of Documentary Arts at Duke University.

== Personal life ==
Cripps was married to Alma Taliaferro (1933–1994) and then to Lynn Traut. He had five children, two of whom preceded him in death. Cripps died on September 17, 2018, at the age of 86 from complications from Alzheimer's disease.

== Bibliography ==
=== Books ===
- Slow Fade to Black: The Negro in American Film, 1900–1942 (1977)
- Black Film as Genre (1993)
- Making Movies Black: The Hollywood Message Movie from World War II to the Civil Rights Era (1993)
- Hollywood's High Noon: Moviemaking & Society Before Television (1997)

=== Films ===
- Black Shadows on a Silver Screen, 1975

=== Papers ===
- Cripps, Thomas R. (1963). "The Reaction of the Negro to the Motion Picture Birth of a Nation". The Historian. 25 (3): 344–362. doi:10.1111/j.1540-6563.1963.tb00220.x. ISSN 0018-2370. JSTOR 24441528.
- The Lily White Republicans: the Negro, the party, and the South in the progressive era (Thesis). 1967. OCLC 10238509.
- Cripps, Thomas (July 1975). "The Movie Jew as an Image of Assimilationism, 19031927". Journal of Popular Film. 4 (3): 190–207. doi:10.1080/00472719.1975.10661772. ISSN 0047-2719.
- Movies, Race, and World War II, 2005, OCLC 123479822
