= Elvis Mitchell =

American film critic and radio host (born 1958)

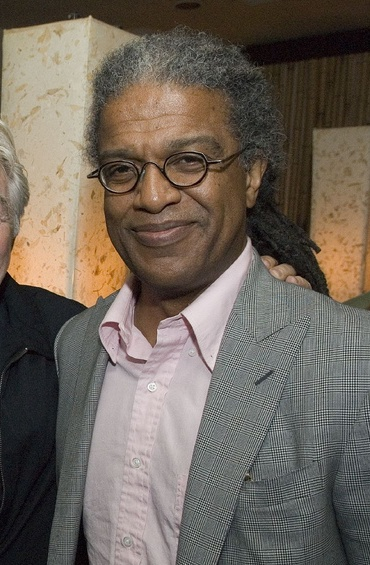
- Mitchell in 2007
- Born: December 6, 1958 (age 67); Highland Park, Michigan, United States
- Education: Wayne State University (1980)
- Occupation: Film critic
- Years active: 1980–present

Elvis Mitchell (born December 6, 1958) is an American film critic, host of the public radio show The Treatment, and visiting lecturer at Harvard University. He has served as a film critic for the Fort Worth Star-Telegram, the LA Weekly, The Detroit Free Press, and The New York Times. He had also been an interviewer for Interview Magazine. In the summer of 2011, he was appointed as curator of LACMA's new film series, Film Independent at LACMA. He is also currently a Film Scholar and lecturer at the University of Nevada, Las Vegas.

== Life and career ==
Mitchell was born in Highland Park, Michigan, in the Metro Detroit area. He graduated in 1980 from Wayne State University, where he majored in English. He was a film critic for the Fort Worth Star-Telegram, the LA Weekly, The Detroit Free Press, and The New York Times.

In the 1990s, Mitchell was part of a short-lived PBS show called Edge. On the series, he provided film commentary and general criticism. In one segment, Mitchell offered a quick run-down of all of director Oliver Stone's tropes, including "always keep that camera moving," which he said while moving a camcorder over a model of a Vietnam jungle and prison camp set up on a table. He was also the host of the Independent Film Channel's Independent Focus, a one-on-one interview show in front of a live audience from 1998 to 2001.

In March 2005, Mitchell was announced as the co-head (along with producer Deborah Schindler) of a New York City office for Sony's Columbia Pictures. Mitchell's role would be to help scout new minority talent and make movies for minority audiences. Mitchell never appeared for work, leaving Schindler to run the office alone, and as of 2011 he had refused to discuss his behavior.

From 2008 to 2010, Mitchell co-produced The Black List, a three-part series of documentaries about African Americans in the entertainment industry, with director Timothy Greenfield-Sanders. The first film, The Black List (2008), includes Toni Morrison, Chris Rock and Kareem Abdul-Jabbar among others. The Black List: Volume 2 (2009) features Angela Davis, Tyler Perry and RZA, among others. The Black List: Volume 3 (2010) includes interviews with John Legend, Lee Daniels and Whoopi Goldberg, among others.

Since 1996, Mitchell has been the host of Santa Monica, California, public radio station KCRW's pop culture and film interview program The Treatment, which is nationally distributed and podcast. He served for a number of years as a pop culture commentator for Weekend Edition on NPR. In 2008, Elvis Mitchell: Under the Influence began airing on Turner Classic Movies. On the program, Mitchell interviews actors and directors about their favorite classic films.

Mitchell is featured in the 2009 documentary film For the Love of Movies: The Story of American Film Criticism discussing how he was championed as a young writer by Pauline Kael, and the impact on him as an adolescent of the Herschell Gordon Lewis film, Two Thousand Maniacs!.

On September 10, 2010, film critic Roger Ebert announced he would be returning to television after his cancer treatment, and was producing a movie review show for public television. He also announced Mitchell would co-host the show along with film critic Christy Lemire of the Associated Press. On December 14, 2010, the Chicago Sun-Times reported Mitchell would not be appearing on the new show. Mitchell later simply stated he “couldn’t come to an agreement” for appearing the show, while Karina Longeorth in the L.A. Times wrote there were industry rumors he had poor onscreen chemistry with Lemire, and/or the lower-budget show would not pay a salary Mitchell expected.

In January 2011, it was announced that Mitchell had joined the Movieline as chief film critic, along with Stephanie Zacharek. Penske Media Corp terminated him after more than three months as Movieline.com's chief film critic.

Mitchell has been hired by the LACMA in partnership with Film Independent as curator of a new film series, Film Independent at LACMA. It was announced on June 16, 2011, that Mitchell would start his new job on the weekly film series in July. The series launched on October 13, 2011, with the world premiere of The Rum Diary, an adaptation of Hunter S. Thompson's novel, by director Bruce Robinson, starring Johnny Depp.

On April 4, 2019, Mitchell was the moderator at the 2019 CinemaCon Filmmakers Forum, where the guests included Elizabeth Banks, Olivia Wilde, and the Russo brothers. On February 9, 2020, on the Red Carpet at the Oscars program, Mitchell said "capitalism is ruining humanity".

In October 2022, Mitchell's documentary film Is That Black Enough for You?!? premiered at the New York Film Festival.

== In popular culture ==
In 2007, Mitchell appeared in an episode of the HBO TV series Entourage, playing himself.

In 2014, Mitchell was mentioned as "the bad boy of public radio" during the FOX TV series Bob's Burgers episode "Friends With Burger-Fits".
