= The Restorers =

- Cover art
- Directed by: Adam N. White
- Written by: Adam N. White
- Produced by: Hemlock Films
- Production company: Hemlock Films
- Release date: July 19, 2003
- Running time: 60 minutes
- Country: United States
- Language: English

The Restorers (sometimes referred to as The Restorers: Giving History a Future...) is a 2003 documentary film by Adam White about restoration of vintage war planes ranging from the F4U Corsair to the B-17 "Yankee Lady". White interviewed dozens of people who have dedicated much of their lives and thousands of dollars to restore planes for museums, air shows, or their own personal collections. The subjects range from people who restore planes in their own garages to major corporations; the end results range from planes that are used in exhibitions and air shows to planes that are restored as racing vehicles.

In 2005, White earned a regional 2004 Emmy Award for the film. The film had been released July 18–20, 2003 at the Neon Movies in Dayton, Ohio in conjunction with the Vectren Dayton Air Show. In February 2004, the film was made available in both DVD and VHS format. On March 3, 2004 it was screened at the Fargo Film Festival where it won Documentary Feature Runner-Up award. It debuted on television on Western Reserve Public Media April 13, 2004 and was reaired on June 16. The Public Broadcasting Service (PBS) broadcast made the film eligible for the 2004 Best Special Programming regional Emmy Award by the Cleveland Regional chapter of the National Academy of Television Arts and Sciences, which it won. The film had limited national PBS broadcasts in 2006 and 2008. While producing this film, White stumbled upon the restoration efforts of the Red Tail Project, which led to the production of Red Tail Reborn.
