= Benjamin Pule Leinaeng =

South African anti-apartheid activist (1930s?–2002)

- Born: 1937; Bloemfontein, Free State, South Africa
- Died: 2000 (aged 62–63); Bloemfontein, Free State, South Africa
- Other names: B. Pule Leinaeng; Lee
- Occupations: Anti-apartheid activist, journalist
- Known for: ANC activist in exile; member of the Bloemfontein 12
- Movement: African National Congress

Benjamin Pule Leinaeng, (born 1937) also known as B. Pule "Lee" Leinaeng, was a South African anti-apartheid activist, journalist, and member of the African National Congress (ANC). He was among the first ANC members to leave South Africa in exile following the banning of the ANC in 1960 and was one of the group later known as the Bloemfontein 12, or the Twelve Disciples of Nelson Mandela.

== Early life ==
Leinaeng was born in 1937 in Bloemfontein in the Free State and he became politically active as a young man through the African National Congress during the apartheid era.

== Political activism and exile ==
Following the banning of the African National Congress in 1960, Leinaeng was one of twelve young activists from Bloemfontein who left South Africa to continue the liberation struggle from exile. The group became known as the Bloemfontein 12 or the Twelve Disciples of Nelson Mandela, because of their commitment to the ANC and its leadership.

The group travelled through southern and eastern Africa before settling in exile. Leinaeng lived in Tanganyika (later Tanzania), East Germany, and subsequently the United States. Once in New York, Leinaeng studied journalism at Temple University and later obtained a master's degree from New York University in 1976. He worked as a broadcast journalist and was associated with the United Nations' anti-apartheid program, using international media to raise awareness of apartheid and to support the ANC in exile.

== Personal life ==
While living in New York, Leinaeng married the American educator and anti-apartheid activist and member of Black Power, Rudean Leinaeng. Through this marriage he became the stepfather of filmmaker and photographer Thomas Allen Harris, who later documented Leinaeng's life and the story of the Bloemfontein 12 in the award-winning documentary Twelve Disciples of Nelson Mandela.

== Legacy ==
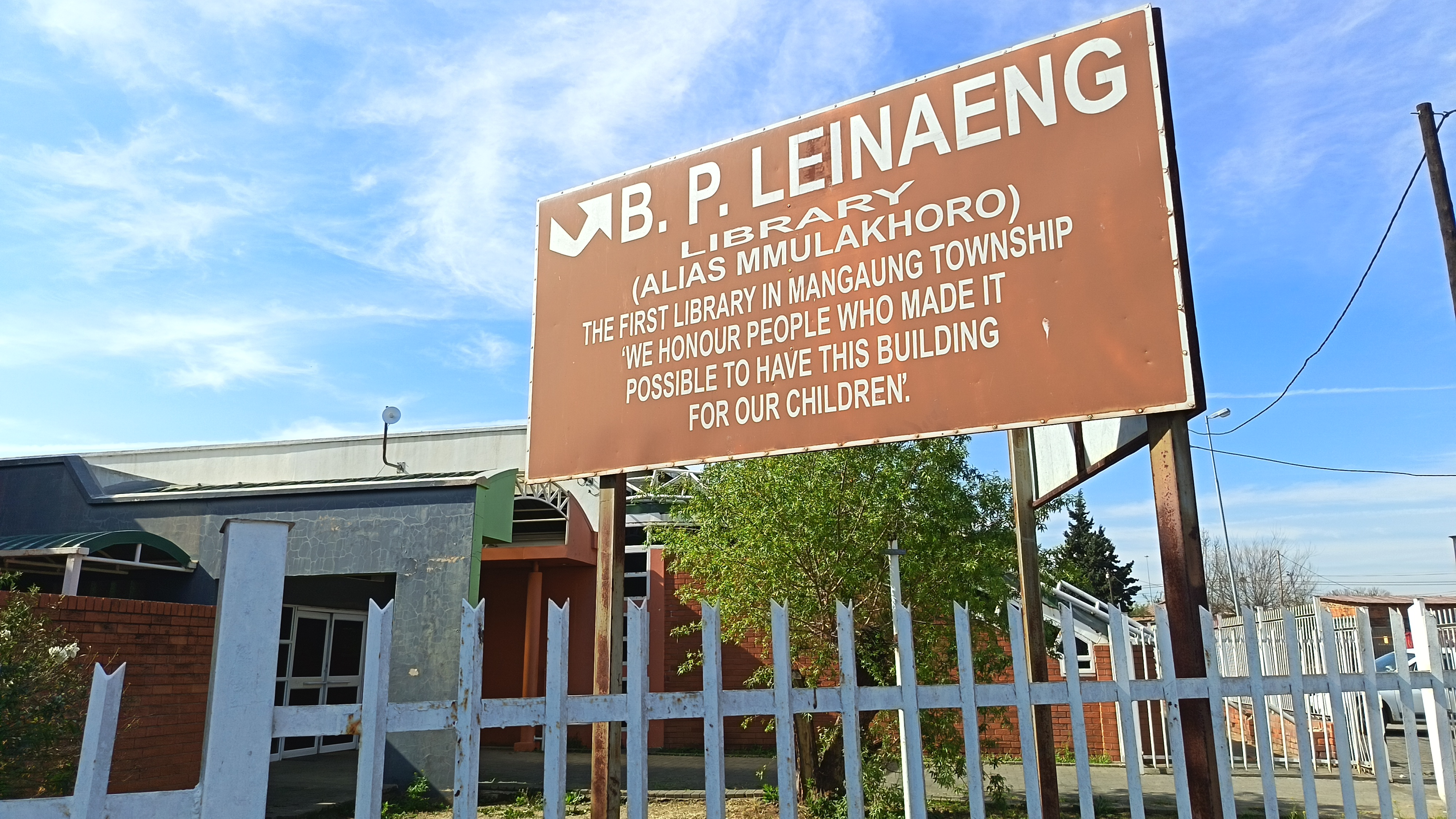
B.P. Leinaeng Public Library in Phahameng,Mangaung,Bloemfontein.

Leinaeng hass been commemorated through the naming of the B.P. Leinaeng Library in Phahameng, Bloemfontein, the first library established in Mangaung township.

His life is also the subject of the 2005 documentary film Twelve Disciples of Nelson Mandela, directed by his step son,Thomas Allen Harris. The documentary traces Leinaeng's role in the liberation struggle alongside the experiences of the other members of the Bloemfontein 12 and examines the personal and political legacy of exile.

== See also ==
- Twelve Disciples of Nelson Mandela
- African National Congress
