= Post-Newsweek Productions =

Documentary film producer

Post-Newsweek Productions was a film production company in the United States that made documentary films about aspects of American history. It produced various documentary films about aspects of American history. Alan Perris served as its president. In 1982 it was consolidated with Newsweek Video into Post-Newsweek Video. Narrators for the films include actors William Shatner, Gloria Swanson, Ossie Davis, and Theodore Bikel.

Writer and producer Ray Hubbard worked on several of the films. He created the "American Documents" series in 1976, the bicentennial year of the United States, and made 13 hour-long films about America's cultural history. The programs were syndicated nationally. Narrators for the films include William Shatner, Gloria Swanson, Ossie Davis, and Theodore Bikel.

== History ==
The Washington Post got into television broadcasting by acquiring a television station. Post Stations Inc. became Post-Newsweek Stations Inc. after the acquisition of Newsweek magazine in 1961.

== Films ==
The "American Documents" series includes the films Black Shadows on a Silver Screen, The Legendary West, A Moment in Time, Just Around the Corner, and Working for the Lord. In 1986, Republic Pictures issued some of the "American Documents" films.

The 1973 documentary The Age of Ballyhoo was directed by David Shepard and narrated by Gloria Swanson. It examines American culture during the 1920s and was marketed as "The Roaring Twenties as seen by the people who lived it!". It was released on DVD accompanying Cecil B. DeMille's 1926 film The Clinging Vine starring Leatrice Joy.

The documentary The Moving Picture Boys in the Great War includes stills and clips from old movies and footage of U.S. President Woodrow Wilson in the White House with sheep outside it. It is dedicated to Erich von Stroheim. The film was researched and compiled by John D. Abel, Robert C. Allen, Peter DuFour, and Larry Ward. It was released as a Republic Pictures Home Video.

In 1981 the production company planned to videotape Abbey Theater of Dublin productions for U.S. audiences.

== Filmography ==
- The Age of Ballyhoo (1973) by David Shepard, a documentary about the 1920s with Hollywood film clips and newsreel footage
- Immigrants - We all came to America (1974) by Ray Hubbard. Theodore Bikel narrates.
- The Legendary West : how movie makers and pulp magazines glamorized the Old West (1975)
- The Building of the Capitol (1975)
- A Moment in Time (1976)
- Patent Pending (1975) William Shatner narrates
- How we got the vote : the exciting story of the struggle for female equality Nancy Gager wrote the script and Jean Stapleton narrated. It won an Emmy Award. The film features photographs, cartoons, footage of suffragists in action and interviews with surviving suffragists including Alice Paul and Mabel Vernon.
- Black Shadows on a Silver Screen (1975) narrated by Ossie Davis
- Young Lives (1981), a five episode pilot for a series on the lives and challenges faced by teenagers.
- The Moving picture boys in the Great War (1986), documentary about American attitudes on isolationism
- Inaugural souvenir : the drama and comedy of presidential elections (1986)
- Brought to You By... Santa (1993)

== See also ==
- Graham Media Group
- Newsweek
