= The Isis Papers: The Keys to the Colors =

1991 Afrocentric book on racism

- Author: Frances Cress Welsing
- Language: English
- Subject: Race relations; White supremacy; Melanin theory
- Publisher: Third World Press
- Publication date: 1991
- Publication place: United States
- Media type: Print
- ISBN: 9780883781043

The Isis Papers: The Keys to the Colors is a controversial 1991 collection of essays by Black American psychiatrist Frances Cress Welsing in which she explores the roots of white supremacy using psychoanalysis and melanin theory.

== Background and criticism ==
Welsing developed her ideas in a 1970 paper titled The Cress Theory of Color-Confrontation and Racism (White Supremacy), which she later expanded in The Isis Papers. The title references the Egyptian goddess Isis, symbolizing African heritage and ancient wisdom. In the essays, she argued that white supremacy is driven by a fear of genetic annihilation and the global system of racism is a reaction to the biological dominance of people of color, particularly Black people, with high melanin. She claimed that white people, as genetic recessives, subconsciously fear being "wiped out" through interracial reproduction. The book also connects racism to alleged white dominance in sports, media, language, religion, war and all areas of human activity as part of the fear for annihilation.

=== Criticism ===
While critics question the scientific validity of Welsing's core theses, commentators in general acknowledge the influence of her work in Afrocentric, Black nationalist and psychological discourses, citing it as a provocative attempt to reframe systemic racism through a psycho-symbolic and genetic lens.

However, critics have accused Welsing of employing pseudoscientific and racial essentialism in her theories, shot down for claiming that racism is biological. In a 1993 essay titled "Melanin, Afrocentricity, and Pseudoscience", published in the American Journal of Physical Anthropology, anthropologist Bernard R. Ortiz de Montellano critiques what he refers to as the "melanist" strand of Afrocentrism, a scholarship that ascribes paranormal or intellectual superiority to melanin pigmentation. Ortiz de Montellano specifically calls out Welsing and others (such as Leonard Jeffries and Richard King) as primary proponents of these pseudoscientific ideas. He argues that the alleged properties of melanin are unsupported by science.

A 1990 Los Angeles Times article described Welsing's theory as "outlandish" and "crackpot," with critics expressing concern that it essentializes race and misapplies psychiatric logic. In response, Welsing defended her framework, saying "Truth, when you first hear it, can be very upsetting."

Critics note that Welsing's suggestion that white-skinned people descend from albino populations expelled from ancient Black African societies lacks support from anthropological or genetic evidence. Scholars such as Cheikh Anta Diop and Yosef Ben-Jochannan, who affirmed the African origin of humanity, did not support the idea of an albino diaspora forming a distinct white race. Additionally, modern genetics shows that all races produce melanin to some degree, and that light skin likely evolved as an adaptation to less tropical climates rather than a result of genetic defect.

In the Black Agenda Report, R. L. Stephens II called Welsing's theories "profoundly counter-revolutionary," arguing they undermine anti-capitalist analysis within Black liberation movements as they reduce racism not to psycho-biological conflict instead to political economy and class struggle.

Welsing's claims that melanin grants Black people supernatural abilities and that homosexuality among African-American men is a conspiracy to reduce the Black population were also widely criticized as pseudoscience.
