= Hoteps =

Afrocentrist group of African Americans

Hoteps is a derogatory exonym for an African-American subculture that adopts ancient Egyptian history as a source of Black pride while promoting pseudohistory and misinformation about African-American history. Hoteps espouse a mixture of Black radicalism and social conservatism.

== Etymology ==
The term "hotep" was originally used among Afrocentrists as a greeting, similar to "I come in peace", but by the mid-2010s had come to be used disparagingly to "describe a person who's either a clueless parody of Afrocentricity" or "someone who's loudly, conspicuously and obnoxiously pro-black but anti-progress". (Note: Anthropologist Miranda Lovett wrote that "Pinpointing when and where this definition of 'Hotep' arose is difficult".)

== Ideology ==
One of their more recognizable beliefs uses modern American racial and ethnic constructs to define the civilization of ancient Egypt, asserting that it was racially homogeneous and uniformly made up of a single ethnic group of Black people. This belief has been criticised for contradicting mainstream and scholarly understanding that ancient Egypt was a diverse civilization consisting of people of various skin tones and backgrounds.

Hoteps espouse a mixture of black radicalism and social conservatism, often through generating social media content on sites such as X (formerly Twitter) and Instagram. Members of the subculture promote conspiracy theories, often through internet memes, as well as inaccurate historical claims. Hoteps often denounce homosexuality and interracial marriage, promote the view that Black women should be subordinate to Black men, and oppose LGBT rights and feminism, which they view as inimical to Black liberation. A substantial number of hoteps promote antisemitic conspiracy theories. Commentator Matthew Sheffield wrote in 2018 that "a significant portion of self-identified hoteps have so much in common with far-right white nationalism" that the subculture "has been dubbed the 'ankh right' by some of its black critics" (a play on the term "alt-right").

While they are often identified as practicing a form of Afrocentrism, Molefi Kete Asante argues that hoteps lack a grasp of Afrocentric academic theory and philosophy and thus cannot be termed Afrocentric.

== Origin ==
In the 1930s, hotep ideology originated in the Islam-inspired teachings of Wallace Fard Muhammad, a door-to-door salesman and founder of the American black nationalist organization Nation of Islam. Claiming he was the incarnation of Noble Drew Ali, Muhammad "borrowed from traditional Islamic behavioral practices" to create "a myth designed especially to appeal to African Americans". Prominent members included Malcolm X and Elijah Muhammad.

Although its members are not always called "hoteps", the community originated in response to early 20th-century Egyptomania within the American black community as well as in response to the emergence of Afrocentrism following the civil rights movement (with a later resurgence in the 1980s and 1990s).

== In popular culture ==
In 2018, the Netflix series Dear White People featured a hotep antagonist, Trevor, played by Shamier Anderson.

In 2019, comedian Robin Thede portrayed a recurring hotep character on multiple segments of A Black Lady Sketch Show.

== Reception ==
Critics have argued that hotep beliefs are too narrow-minded, contending that they only focus on Ancient Egypt, as opposed to Sub-Saharan Africa and other aspects of African history. Black feminists argue that hoteps perpetuate patriarchy and rape culture by policing women's sexuality and tolerating predatory black men.

Anthropologist Miranda Lovett, writing in the online magazine Sapiens, critiqued Hotep-promoted internet memes that "juxtapose incongruous elements of African culture and contemporary life" and present Black women as "Nubian queens" or "mothers of civilization" who "are expected to serve primarily as support to their Black husbands". Lovett argues: "The Hoteps movement is a testament to the uniquely painful and complicated history of African Americans. It is anchored in a long tradition of looking to Africa for points of needed pride. Yet it also risks propagating false histories and conventions, and, ironically, disparaging Black women and those who are LGBTQ in the service of elevating Black identity."

=== Notable adherents ===
Notable people who have promoted hotep ideas, or have been described as part of the hotep subculture, include Kanye West, Kyrie Irving, and Umar Johnson.

== See also ==
- Ancient Egyptian race controversy
  - Cleopatra race controversy
- African-American Jews
- Black Hebrew Israelites
  - Black Judaism
- African-American Muslims
  - Moorish Science Temple of America
  - United Nation of Islam
  - Your Black Muslim Bakery
- Nuwaubian Nation
- Five-Percent Nation
- Ausar Auset Society
