= Twelve Disciples of Nelson Mandela =

- Directed by: Thomas Allen Harris
- Written by: Thomas Allen Harris
- Produced by: Woo Cho, Thomas Allen Harris, Rudean Leinaeng, Donald Lester Perry II
- Cinematography: David Forbes, Jonathan Kovel
- Edited by: Sabine Hoffmann, Samuel D. Pollard
- Music by: Vernon Reid
- Release date: September 11, 2005 (Toronto International Film Festival)
- Running time: 75 minutes
- Language: English

Twelve Disciples of Nelson Mandela is a 2005 documentary film about a generation of men, considered terrorists by the U.S. government, who left South Africa to form the African National Congress and spread their message across the world. Filmmaker Thomas Allen Harris focuses on his stepfather Benjamin Pule Leinaeng, who was among the first ANC members to leave South Africa in 1960.

Twelve Disciples of Nelson Mandela was met with critical acclaim, winning an Independent Spirit Award nomination for its Stranger Than Fiction category and was aired on PBS as part of its Point of View series in 2006.
