= Shireen Mitchell =

American entrepreneur, author, technology analyst

- Born: New York City, New York, U.S.
- Education: Howard University (BS); University of the District of Columbia (MS)
- Website: Official website

Shireen Mitchell is an American entrepreneur, author, technology analyst and diversity strategist. She founded Digital Sisters/Sistas, Inc., the first organization dedicated to bringing women and girls of color online and Stop Online Violence Against Women (SOVAW), a project that addresses laws and policies to provide protections for women while online.

== Career ==
Shireen Mitchell began designing bulletin board systems and gopher (protocol) sites prior to the advent of websites. She was the webmaster for PoliticallyBlack.com, a site that was sold to Netivation (NTVN) a large media company as one of the web transactions in the late 1990s that later went public.

Mitchell formed the first woman of color web management firm in 1997, the Mitchell Holden Group (MHG). She then founded Digital Sisters/Sistas in 1999, first as a website and then an advocacy and training organization that focuses on technology, new media and diversity. Digital Sisters was the first organization created specifically to help women and girls of color get into the STEM field and use technology in their daily lives.

In 2010, she formed Tech Media Swirl LLC, a digital social strategy company focused integrated media strategies for outreach to diverse communities. In 2013, she founded Stop Online Violence Against Women (SOVAW). The project highlights diverse voices of women, and in particular, women of color. On October 5, 2020, Mitchell was named as one of the 25 members of the "Real Facebook Oversight Board", an independent monitoring group over Facebook.

== Honors and awards ==
- Eelan Media, Top 100 Most Influential Black People on digital/social media, 2014
- DC Inno, Top Ten Influencers in Social Media, 2012
- Fast Company Most Influential Women in Tech, 2010
- Washingtonian's Tech Titans, 2009
- The Root, 100 African-American Leaders of Excellence, 2009

== Published works ==
- Gaining Daily Access to Science and Technology, 50 Ways to Improve Women's Lives. Inner Ocean Publishing. June 21, 2007. ISBN 978-1-930722-45-3.
