= Flight of the Red Tail =

- Cover art
- Directed by: Adam N. White
- Produced by: Hemlock Films
- Narrated by: James Kisicki
- Edited by: Adam N. White
- Music by: Keith Philip Nickoson
- Production company: Hemlock Films
- Release date: July 27, 2009 (EAA AirVenture Oshkosh)
- Running time: 12 minutes
- Country: United States
- Language: English

Flight of the Red Tail is a 2009 historical documentary film by Adam White about the Red Tail Project's successful return to flight of a World War II P-51 Mustang. The plane had been originally flown by the United States Air Force 332d Fighter Group as a bomber escort for the Allied Forces in the European Theatre of World War II and serves as a travelling and flying tribute to the Tuskegee Airmen. It had become inoperable during a 2004 crash after having been restored for exhibition flying once before in 2001. The Red Tail Project is a part of the Commemorative Air Force. The film is a sequel to Red Tail Reborn which brought attention to the attempt to relaunch of the plane after the 2004 crash.

== Details ==
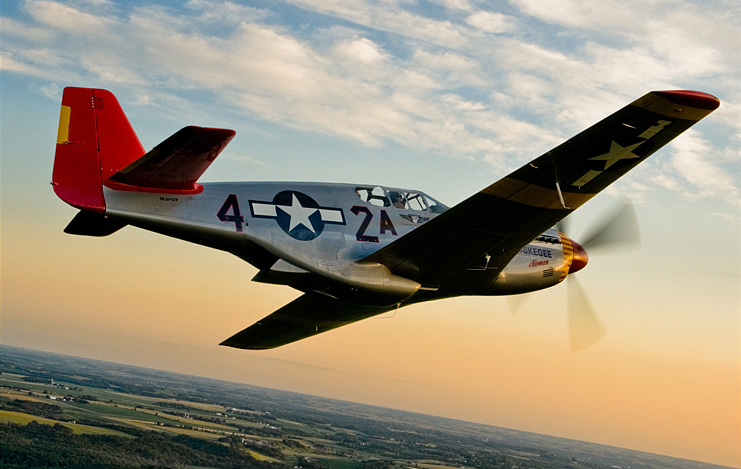
The restored World War II P-51 Mustang flown by Red Tail Project as described in the film (2009-08-05)

The film was released in DVD format on November 27, 2009. The film, which was produced in NTSC Dolby 5.1 format, had a running time of 12 minutes. It is contained on a single disc. This film chronicles the reconstruction by picking up where Red Tail Reborn left off in 2007. It is described as a companion piece to its predecessor, but White says it is only part of a continuing story.

The five-year restoration occurred at Tri-State Aviation in Wahpeton, North Dakota from 2004 to 2009. In 2007 Gerry Beck, one of the primary restorers was in an aviation collision of a P-51A and a P-51D during AirVenture 2007. Nonetheless, the rebuilding continued with the mounting of the engine in 2008 and the mating of the wing in 2009. On July 22, 2009, four days before AirVenture 2009 in Oshkosh, Wisconsin the plane had its first flight. Then, it was flown to Wisconsin for its public debut. After the show it returned to Minnesota with a 6 AT-6 escort.
