= Kevin Cokley =

American academic and author

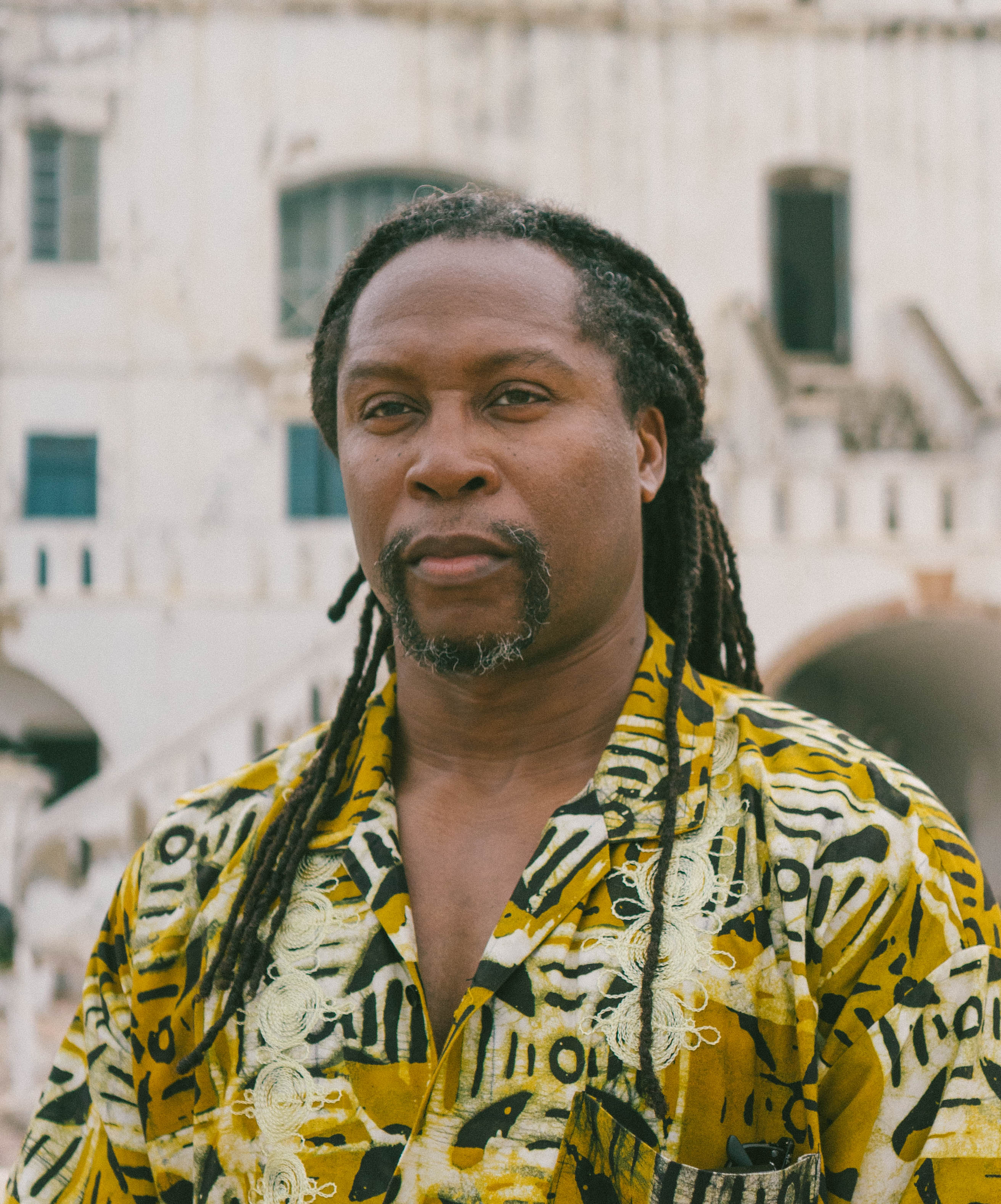
- Born: 1969 (age 56–57); Mount Airy, North Carolina
- Occupations: Psychologist, academic and researcher
- Title: University Diversity and Social Transformation Professor, Associate Chair of Diversity Initiatives, Professor of Psychology
- Awards: Distinguished Psychologist Award, Association of Black Psychologists

Academic background
- Education: B.A. M.Ed. Ph.D.
- Alma mater: Wake Forest University; University of North Carolina at Greensboro; Georgia State University
- Website: http://www.kevincokley.com/

Kevin Cokley is an African-American counselling psychologist, academic and researcher. He is University Diversity and Social Transformation Professor, Associate Chair of Diversity Initiatives, Professor of Psychology at the University of Michigan Ann Arbor. Previously he was the Oscar and Anne Mauzy Regents Professor of Educational Research and Development, Department Chair of Educational Psychology, and Professor of African and African Diaspora Studies at the University of Texas at Austin, where he directed the Institute for Urban Policy Research & Analysis. He was a Fellow of the UT System Academy of Distinguished Teachers and a Distinguished Teaching Professor at the University of Texas at Austin.

Cokley's research is focused on racial issues and the impact of the imposter phenomenon in academic and mental health outcomes. He is the author of The Myth of Black Anti-Intellectualism: A True Psychology of African American Students, which was published in 2014. He is the editor of Making Black Lives Matter: Confronting Anti-Black Racism, which was published in 2021, and editor of "The Impostor Phenomenon: Psychological Research, Theory, and Interventions" which was published in 2024.

Cokley is a fellow of the American Psychological Association and the former Editor-In-Chief of the Journal of Black Psychology.

== Education ==
Cokley graduated from Wake Forest University's Department of Psychology in 1991. Then he received his master's degree in Counselor Education from the University of North Carolina at Greensboro in 1993. He completed his doctoral studies in Counseling Psychology from Georgia State University in 1998.

== Career ==
Following his Ph.D. degree, Cokley taught at Southern Illinois University Carbondale as an assistant professor from 1998 until 2004, and at the University of Missouri as an associate professor from 2004 until 2007. In 2010, Cokley joined the University of Texas at Austin as an Associate Professor and in 2013, he was promoted to Professor of Educational Psychology and African and African Diaspora Studies.

In 2014, Cokley was appointed as Director of the Institute for Urban Policy Research & Analysis at the University of Texas.

In 2022, Cokley joined the University of Michigan Ann Arbor as University Diversity and Social Transformation Professor, Associate Chair of Diversity Initiatives, and professor of psychology.

== Research ==
Cokley applies an emic approach to his work and focused much of his early research on racial issues, academic self-concept and academic achievement. His later research has focused on exploring impostor syndrome and other correlates of mental health, including perceived discrimination, and minority status stress among African Americans and ethnic minorities.

Cokley's research regarding racial and ethnic identity has focused on applying new developments in racial identity theory, and critically examining theoretical foundations of racial identity theories and the psychometric soundness of racial and ethnic identity instruments. Cokley has challenged the continued use of psychometrically problematic instruments, and argued that both science and ideology have influenced the study of racial and ethnic identity.

Cokley has written about racial identity theory and described in the Handbook of African American Psychology, the seminal models, key racial identity theories, and the future directions regarding racial identity.

=== Academic self-concept and academic achievement ===
Cokley has focused on factors affecting the academic achievement of African American students. His work has identified academic self-concept as one of the strongest predictors of academic achievement. He has also found GPA to be the best predictor of academic self-concept for African American students attending predominantly White colleges and universities (PWCUs) while finding the quality of student-faculty interactions to be the best predictors of academic self-concept for African American students attending historically Black colleges and universities (HBCUs).

In research regarding academic disidentification among African American and European American students, Cokley found that African American male students experienced significant academic disidentification compared to other students. He also studied the attitudes of African American students using empirical data collected on academic motivation, academic self-concept, and GPA.

=== Impostor phenomenon ===
Cokley explores impostor phenomenon among African Americans and other ethnic minorities. Imposter phenomenon is one's belief in and experience of one's self as an intellectual fraud. In his first empirical impostor phenomenon study, Cokley et al. (2013) found that impostor feelings were a stronger predictor of mental health than minority status stress.

== Selected awards and honors ==
- 2008 – '10 Rising Stars of the academy' award, Diverse Issues in Higher Education
- 2010 – Charles and Shirley Thomas Award for mentoring, education, and training of ethnic minority students, American Psychological Association
- 2014 – Regents’ Outstanding Teaching Award
- 2017 - University of Texas System Academy of Distinguished Teachers
- 2018 – Distinguished Psychologist Award, Association of Black Psychologists
- 2019 – University of Texas Academy of Distinguished Teachers
- 2020 – Named Top 25 Essential Black Voices on Mental Health and Wellness by Relevant Magazine
- 2022 - University of Michigan Diversity and Social Transformation Professorship

== Bibliography ==
=== Books ===
- The Myth of Black Anti-Intellectualism: A True Psychology of African American Students (2014) ISBN 9781440831577
- Making Black Lives Matter: Confronting Anti-Black Racism (2021) ISBN 978-1793531858

=== Selected articles ===
- Cokley, K. (2007). Critical issues in the measurement of ethnic and racial identity: A referendum on the state of the field. Journal of Counseling Psychology, 54, 224–234.
- Cokley, K. (2000). An investigation of academic self-concept and its relationship to academic achievement in African American college students. Journal of Black Psychology, 26(2), 148–164.
- Cokley, K. (2003). What do we know about the motivation of African American college students? Challenging the “anti-intellectual myth”. Harvard Educational Review, 73, 524–558.
- Cokley, K., McClain, S., Enciso, A., & Martinez, M. (2013). An examination of minority status stress, impostor feelings and mental health among ethnic minority college students. Journal of Multicultural Counseling and Development, 41(2), 82–95.
- Cokley, K., Smith, L., Bernard, D., Hurst, A., Jackson, S., Stone, S., & ....Roberts, D. (2017). Impostor feelings as a moderator and mediator of the relationship between perceived discrimination and mental health among racial/ethnic minority college students. Journal of Counseling Psychology, 64(2), 141–154.
- Cokley, K. & Garba, R. (2018). Speaking truth to power: How Black/African psychology changed the discipline of psychology. Journal of Black Psychology, 44(8), 695–721.
- Cokley, K., Krueger, N., Cunningham, S. R., Burlew, K., Hall, S., Harris, K., Castelin, S., & Coleman, C. (2022). The COVID-19/racial injustice syndemic and mental health among Black Americans: The roles of general and race-related COVID worry, cultural mistrust and perceived discrimination. Journal of Community Psychology, 50(6), 2542–2561.
