= Hairkutt =

- Promotional poster for the film
- Directed by: Curtis Elliott; Ben Scholle
- Produced by: Curtis Elliott; Ben Scholle
- Starring: Maurice Bradley; Anthony Dorsey; Curtis Elliott; Bryant Johnson
- Cinematography: Maurice Bradley; Martin Cervino; Anthony Dorsey; Joe Meier; Zak Mussig
- Edited by: Ben Scholle
- Music by: Vince Deloney, including "High All Day"; Ben Scholle
- Distributed by: Brave New Theaters
- Release dates: March 2005 (New York International Independent Film and Video Festival); July 28, 2007 (United States)
- Running time: 77 minutes
- Country: United States
- Language: English

Hairkutt is a 2005 documentary film by Curtis Elliott and Ben Scholle.

== Plot ==
The film stars Bryant "HairKutt" Johnson, director Elliott, Maurice Bradley, and Anthony Dorsey as four friends from St. Louis, Missouri, who travel to a remote cabin in the Great Smoky Mountains of Tennessee. Their plan is to spend a week together to help Hairkutt quit his 15-year addiction to heroin.

Hairkutt longs to end his heroin addiction in order to finally care for his daughter and to realize his dream of running his own hair-cutting business. His friends, particularly Curtis Elliott, want to help him, so they travel to a cabin in Tennessee, cover its carpeting with plastic sheeting, and prepare restraining ropes on one of the beds. Hairkutt will attempt to quit cold turkey.

It is stated that 99% of attempts to quit heroin cold turkey are unsuccessful.

During the first night, Hairkutt experiences severe withdrawal symptoms while his friends remain with him and provide support. Over the following nights, his condition fluctuates as they care for him and challenge him to confront his addiction, leaving uncertain whether he will recover or continue to deteriorate.

== Cast ==
- Reese ... Maurice Bradley (himself)
- Lark ... Anthony Dorsey (himself)
- Curtis ... Curtis Elliott (himself)
- HairKutt ... Bryant Johnson (himself)

== Format ==
The cinematography is amateur, yet expertly edited by filmmaker Scholle, and spliced together with interviews with the participants. Subtitle explanations of the story as it unfolds and background on the history of drugs and violence in St. Louis complement the scenes.

Original music by Ben Scholle and Vince Deloney adds texture.

== Reception ==
The film won accolades at several documentary film festivals, including Best Documentary at the St. Louis Filmmakers Showcase and the New York International Independent Film and Video Festival.
