= Black Shadows on a Silver Screen =

Documentary film on African American cinema

Black Shadows on a Silver Screen is a 1975 documentary film about African American cinema. It was distributed by Lucerne Films. Steven York directed and edited the film. Ossie Davis narrates.

The movie was screened at the 1977 Cannes Film Festival. Thomas Cripps wrote the film. Ray Hubbard executive produced and Stephan Henriquez and William Bowman produced under Post-Newsweek Productions.

The film Birth of a Race is noted in the documentary. Clips from various films including Pinky, Hearts in Dixie, So Red the Rose, and Birth of a Nation are included.

== See also ==
- African American cinema
- Midnight Ramble, a 1994 documentary about the early history of Black American movies between 1910 and 1950
