= The Black List (film series) =

2008 film

The Black List is a series of films created from 2008 through 2010 as part of The Black List Project, a film, book and museum tour of photographs conceived by photographer/filmmaker Timothy Greenfield-Sanders, with Elvis Mitchell, public radio host and former New York Times film critic.

== Volume 1 ==
The Black List: Volume 1 premiered at Sundance Film Festival in 2008 and then in August of that year on HBO.

The Black List: Volume 1 won the NAACP Spirit Award in 2009 for best documentary. "The Black List Sold to HBO"

Volume 1 includes: Bill T. Jones, Chris Rock, Colin Powell, Slash, Dawn Staley, Faye Wattleton, Kareem Abdul-Jabbar, Keenen Ivory Wayans, Lorna Simpson, Louis Gossett Jr., Mahlon Duckett, Marc Morial, Rev. Al Sharpton, Richard D. Parsons, Russell Simmons, Sean Combs, Serena Williams, Steven Stoute, Susan Rice, Suzan-Lori Parks, Thelma Golden, Toni Morrison, Vernon Jordan, William Rice and Zane.

== Volume 2 ==
The Black List: Volume 2 is the follow-up to The Black List: Volume 1. It premiered on HBO in February 2009.

The Black List: Volume 2 includes Angela Davis, Bishop Barbara Harris, Bishop T.D. Jakes, Charley Pride, Dr. Valerie Montgomery-Rice, Governor Deval Patrick, Kara Walker, Majora Carter, Laurence Fishburne, Maya Rudolph, Melvin Van Peebles, Patrick Robinson, Rza, Suzanne De Passe, and Tyler Perry.

== Volume 3 ==
The Black List: Volume III was released in February 2010 and includes interviews with Beverly Johnson, Debra L. Lee, Dr. Michael Lomax, Hill Harper, John Legend, LaTanya Richardson, Lee Daniels and Whoopi Goldberg.
