= Red Tail Reborn =

2007 film

- DVD cover
- Directed by: Adam N. White
- Written by: Adam N. White (writer); Hallie Sheck (co-writer)
- Produced by: Hemlock Films
- Starring: Pilots and Crew of the 332d Fighter Group
- Narrated by: Michael Dorn
- Production company: Hemlock Films
- Release date: February 11, 2007
- Running time: 54 min
- Country: United States
- Language: English

Red Tail Reborn is a 2007 historical documentary film by Adam White about the Commemorative Air Force's Red Tail Project. The project involves the restoration, exhibition and maintenance of a World War II P-51 Mustang flown by the United States Air Force 332d Fighter Group. The exhibition of this plane is considered to be a traveling and flying tribute to the Tuskegee Airmen. In addition to increasing awareness of the travails of the Tuskegee Airmen, this film served to highlight the Red Tail Project fundraising effort to rebuild the plane after a 2004 crash.

The film was initially broadcast and released on DVD in 2007 in the director's home state of Ohio, winning local Emmy Award recognition. The following year, it was broadcast nationally for the first time on Public Broadcasting Services (PBS) stations. The film had a sequel called Flight of the Red Tail.

== Story ==
Red Tail Reborn is described by AllMovie as "... the story of the brave African-American pilots who risked their lives in order to ensure that peace prevailed, and the people who have dedicated their lives to ensure that they are not forgotten." It tells three stories in one: the story of the Tuskegee Airmen, the history of the Red Tail Mustangs they flew (one of which is the subject of the restoration efforts) and the story of the late Don Hinz who crashed the first restored Mustang in 2004.

The film sheds light on the bravery and heroism of the Tuskegee Airmen in their service as bomber escorts for the Allied Forces in the European Theatre of World War II. It documents that the Tuskegee Airmen were the country's first African American military aviators taking flight in World War II, despite contemporary stereotyping of African American men as lacking the essential intellectual and emotional qualities necessary to fly. The film even presents government documents deriding African American men as substandard and "cowards". It describes segregation endured by the African American military officers, and it describes how these pilots distinguished themselves with their record.

It details the evolution of the Red Tail Project mission and the re-dedication to this enthusiasm when the mission's leader perished while flying a plane in homage to the Tuskegee Airmen. This includes an explanation of the provenance of the plane and the various restoration efforts that led up to the Red Tail Project.

== History and production ==
Tuskegee Airmen
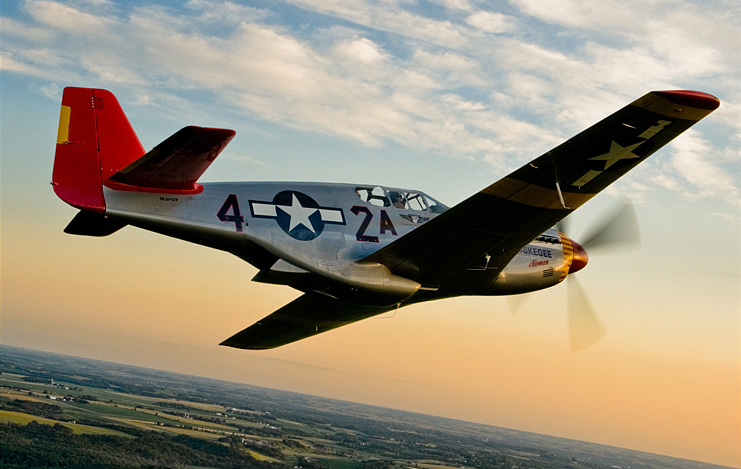
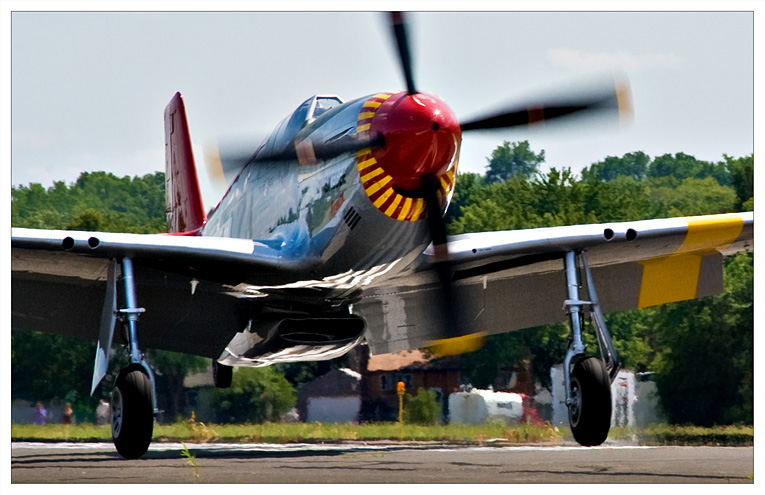
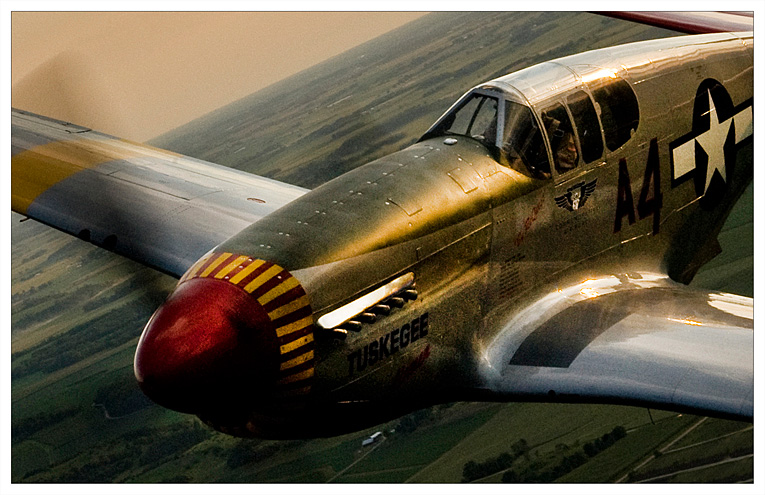
Images of the restored World War II P-51 Mustang flown by Red Tail Project, named Tuskegee Airmen, that is described in the film

Among those that Cleveland filmmaker White interviewed to make the film were 13 of the Tuskegee airmen. Several of the Tuskegee Airmen were from the northeast Ohio region. One of the veterans interviewed was Colonel Charles McGee, who had served in World War II, the Korean War and the Vietnam War and whom White said had more combat flight hours than any other American. The film was shot in Billings, Montana. The film was produced to help increase awareness and elicit financial support for The Red Tail Project. The film was produced by Cleveland-based Hemlock Films, which is White's production company. It was underwritten by the Parker Hannifin Corporation.

The film was inspired while White was filming The Restorers, after a P-51C Mustang landed for refueling and White met Doug Rozendaal, the pilot of the Red Tail Project's Tuskegee Airmen plane. When White heard Don Hinz had been killed in a crash of that very same plane, he felt compelled to do a story focusing on it. Once he got involved in the project, a local PBS station committed to airing the final product, which was an early step in the successful development of the project. When researching the film he noticed a lack of resources about the Tuskegee Airmen and felt driven to fill the void.

== Airings and DVD release ==
The film premiered at the MAPS Air Museum at the Akron-Canton Regional Airport in Green, Ohio on Saturday February 10, 2007 and debuted during a simulcast on Western Reserve Public Media, PBS network stations serving northeastern Ohio, the following day. The stations re-aired the show four more times between February 13 and 20. The film debuted in western Ohio at Wright State University on March 22, 2007, at which time a two-disc DVD was made available. It was released to the general public in DVD format on March 23, 2007. The film, which was not rated, was available in 1.33:1 aspect ratio and in Color, Dolby, DVD, NTSC, widescreen format. was produced in color format. The film began national PBS broadcasts during Black History Month in February 2008, reaching over 300 affiliates in its initial national airing, although specific dates and times varied from station to station. The PBS airings began on February 5. PBS also aired the film later in 2008 during its November Veterans Day programming.

The DVD release includes a second disc with four hours of additional interviews, deleted scenes, and productions stills. A reviewer from Flight Journal, feels the DVD package will connect with an audience of actual and aspiring restorers of military combat aircraft, which sometimes referred to as warbirds. It notes that the narrator, Michael Dorn, is a warbird owner and pilot.

== Legacy ==
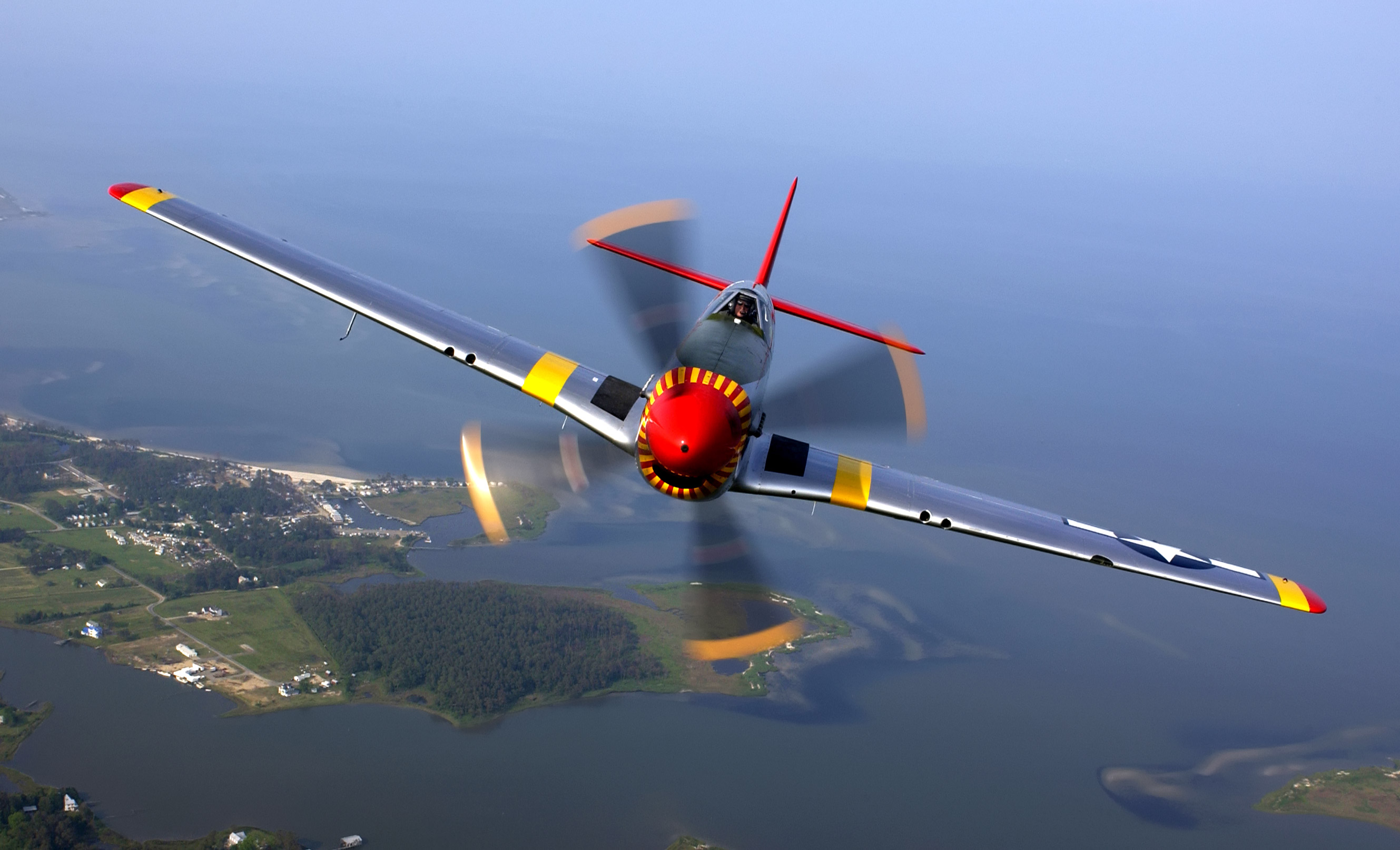
P-51 Mustang in a heritage flight over Langley Air Force Base

In 2008, the film garnered three regional Emmy Awards from the Lower Great Lakes Region of the National Academy of Television Arts and Sciences in the following categories: Best Informational/Instructional Program, Best Music Composition/ Arrangement and Best Research. The film had been nominated for a total of six Emmys including the following additional categories: Best Lighting Location, Best Videographer – Program (Non News), Best Writer – Program (Non-News). The 2004 film followed the success of The Restorers, which chronicled the restoration efforts for various warbird and vintage aircraft and which also won regional Emmy Award recognition. Whereas, The Restorers focuses on general aircraft restoration, the Red Tail Reborn expounds upon the restoration and rebuilding of a specific plane and the Red Tail Project. Although it was not released in theatres and its DVD sales were not among the top 100 in 2007, the success of its national airing spawned a 2009 sequel entitled Flight of the Red Tail, which is also known as Red Tail Reborn 2, that was available on DVD on November 27. The sequel is a 12-minute documentary follow-up.
