= Commandment Keeper Church, Beaufort South Carolina, May 1940 =

- Release date: 1940
- Running time: 42 minutes
- Country: United States
- Language: English

Commandment Keeper Church, Beaufort South Carolina, May 1940 is a 1940 short documentary film which shows religious services taking place in a South Carolina Gullah community.

The documentary film was directed by Zora Neale Hurston.

In 2005, Commandment Keeper Church was selected for preservation in the United States National Film Registry by the Library of Congress as being "culturally, historically, or aesthetically significant".

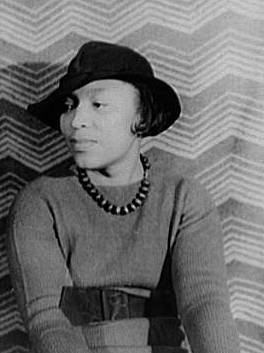
The film's director Zora Neale Hurston. Courtesy Library of Congress Prints and Photographs Online Catalog.
