= Foundational Black Americans =

Term for descendants of US Black slaves

Foundational Black Americans (FBA) is a term used in contemporary social and political discourse to describe a subset of Black Americans who trace their ancestry to people enslaved in the United States. The designation emphasizes lineage connected to American chattel slavery and the historical experiences that followed, including Reconstruction, segregation, and systemic discrimination.

== Definition and usage ==
The term "Foundational Black Americans" is used by some commentators and community members to distinguish descendants of enslaved Black people in the United States from Black immigrants and their descendants. It is often invoked in discussions related to identity, historical continuity, and policy debates surrounding reparations and resource allocation.

Usage of the term has appeared across media platforms, including television segments, political discussions, and online discourse.

== Historical context ==
The concept underlying the term is rooted in the historical experience of Black Americans whose ancestors were enslaved in the United States beginning in the early 17th century. This population experienced centuries of chattel slavery, followed by Reconstruction-era transitions, Jim Crow segregation, and ongoing forms of systemic inequality. However, the FBA traces FBA's as far back as 1526, when Lucas Vázquez de Ayllón allegedly brought black slaves to the Americas. Who, they claim, intermingled with Native Americans after the colony collapsed (due to an alleged slave revolt).

Scholars and commentators have noted that descendants of enslaved people in the United States developed distinct cultural, social, and political traditions shaped by these historical conditions. These contributions include influence on American music, language, religion, and cultural practices.

== Sociological perspectives ==
From a sociological perspective, the term reflects broader discussions about ethnicity, lineage, and identity formation within the United States. Some observers describe it as an attempt to define a lineage-based subgroup within the broader Black American population.

The use of lineage as a defining characteristic has been compared to other forms of ethnic identification that distinguish groups based on historical origin and generational continuity. Discussions surrounding the term often intersect with broader debates about race, ethnicity, and national identity.

== Public discourse and criticism ==
The term has generated debate among commentators, journalists, and political observers. Supporters argue that it provides a framework for recognizing the specific historical experiences of descendants of enslaved people in the United States, particularly in discussions related to reparations, representation, and social equity.

Critics have raised concerns about the term's implications, arguing that it may contribute to divisions within the broader Black population or oversimplify complex histories of migration and identity. Media coverage has also linked discussions of the term to broader issues such as misinformation, political discourse, and identity debates in digital spaces.
