= Through a Lens Darkly =

Through a Lens Darkly: Black Photographers and the Emergence of a People
- Film poster
- Directed by: Thomas Allen Harris
- Screenplay by: Thomas Allen Harris; Paul Carter Harrison; Don Perry
- Based on: Reflections in Black: A History of Black Photographers 1840 to the Present by Deborah Willis
- Produced by: Thomas Allen Harris; Ann Bennett; Don Perry; Deborah Willis; Kimberly Steward
- Cinematography: Martina Radwan
- Edited by: Matthew Cohn; K.A. Miille
- Music by: Miles Jay; Vernon Reid
- Production company: Chimpanzee Productions
- Distributed by: First Run Features
- Release dates: January 17, 2014 (Sundance); August 27, 2014 (United States)
- Running time: 92 minutes
- Country: United States
- Language: English
- Box office: $16,618

Through a Lens Darkly: Black Photographers and the Emergence of a People is a 2014 documentary film directed by Thomas Allen Harris. It is inspired by Reflections in Black: A History of Black Photographers 1840 to the Present by Deborah Willis, who also produced the film. The film had its premiere at the 2014 Sundance Film Festival on January 17, 2014.

The film later screened at 64th Berlin International Film Festival in February 2014. The film also screened at 2014 Santa Barbara International Film Festival on 5 February 2014. It won the Justice Award at the festival. The film had a theatrical release on August 27, 2014 in United States.

== Synopsis ==
The first documentary to explore the role of photography in shaping the identity, aspirations, and social emergence of African Americans from slavery to the present, Through a Lens Darkly: Black Photographers and the Emergence of a People probes the recesses of American history through images that have been suppressed, forgotten, and lost.

== Reception ==
The film received generally positive reviews from critics. Review aggregator Rotten Tomatoes reports that 61% of 18 film critics have given the film a positive review.

Zeba Blay in her review for Indiewire said that "It shows us the disturbing lynch photographs and minstrel illustrations in all their startling, horrific detail. But it also counterbalances them with countless photos of black people by black people, pictures from family albums all the way to the professional work of some of the most seminal black photographers in America. There’s an understanding that the lynch photos, the regal pictures of Booker T. Washington and Sojourner Truth, the images of Carrie Mae Weems staring straight into the camera in her Kitchen Table Series, all lie on a continuum. They’re happening now. And its through these images we’re privy to a secret history of the black photographer and the black subject, a history reaching far back into the past and shining a light on those who paved the way for everyone, all of us, to affirm our own identities through the images we take of ourselves and each other." Dennis Harvey of Variety gave the film a positive review by saying that, "Though a tad uneven, as a whole the documentary cannily juggles an overview of African-American history in general with the specifics of its photographic representation and talents."

AnOther Magazine added it in their "15 Fascinating Art Documentaries to Watch Now." (2020)

Bustle added it in their "22 Films & Shows To Get Creative Juices Flowing." (2016)

FlavorWire added it in their "50 Essential African-American Independent Films." (2015)

MSNBC added it in their "Celebrating black history: Music and movie syllabus."(2015)

The Huffington Post added it in their "10 must see films at (2014) Sundance."

IndieWire added it in their "14 LGBT Films To Look Out For At The 2014 Sundance Film Festival."

== Accolades ==
Accolades
Year	Film Festival	Category	Recipient(s)	Result
2016	The Peabody Awards	Documentary	Thomas Allen Harris	Nominated
2016	Emmy Awards	News & Documentary	Thomas Allen Harris	Nominated
2015	American Library Association	Notable Videos for Adults	Thomas Allen Harris	Won
2015	Black Reel Awards	Outstanding Independent Documentary	Thomas Allen Harris	Nominated
2015	NAACP Image Award	Outstanding Documentary (Theatrical)	Thomas Allen Harris	Won
2015	American Historical Association	John E. O'Connor Film Award Nomination	Thomas Allen Harris	Nominated
2014	Santa Barbara International Film Festival	The Fund for Santa Barbara Social Justice Award	Thomas Allen Harris	Won
2014	10th Africa Movie Academy Awards	Best Diaspora Documentary	Thomas Allen Harris	Won
2014	Pan African Film Festival	Festival Programmers' Award	Thomas Allen Harris	Won
2014	The National Media Market	Best of Show, Collegiate	Thomas Allen Harris	Won

== See also ==
- List of black films of the 2010s
