= Index of articles related to African Americans =

An African American is a citizen or resident of the United States. The term "African American" generally denotes descendants of Africans enslaved in the United States. but can also signify anyone who has origins in any of the black populations of Africa. African American-related topics include:

== 1 ==
- 1st Rhode Island Regiment
- 10th Cavalry Regiment (United States)
- 12 Years a Slave (film)
- 1968 Miami riot

== 2 ==
- 2nd Cavalry Division (United States)
- 27th Cavalry Regiment (United States)
- 28th Cavalry Regiment (United States)
- 24th Infantry Regiment (United States)
- 25th Infantry Regiment (United States)

== 3 ==
- 3 Strikes (film)
- 30 Years to Life
- 35 and Ticking
- 333rd Field Artillery Battalion (United States)
- 366th Infantry Regiment (United States)
- 369th Infantry Regiment (United States)
- 371st Infantry Regiment (United States)
- 372nd Infantry Regiment (United States)

== 4 ==
- 4 Little Girls
- 4CHOSEN: The Documentary
- 40 acres and a mule
- 41st Infantry Regiment (United States)

== 5 ==
- 5th Tank Group (United States)
- 5th United States Colored Cavalry
- 5th United States Colored Infantry Regiment
- 500 Years Later
- 551st Parachute Infantry Battalion (United States)
- 555th Parachute Infantry Battalion (United States)

== 7 ==
- 758th Tank Battalion (United States)
- 761st Tank Battalion (United States)

== 8 ==
- 805th Pioneer Infantry

== 9 ==
- 9th Cavalry Regiment (United States)
- 92nd Infantry Division (United States)
- 93rd Infantry Division (United States)

== A ==
- AALBC.com
- Abolitionism in the United States
- Above the Rim
- ACAE
- Acid jazz
- Acting white
- Address to the Negroes of the State of New York
- The Advocate (Portland, Oregon)
- Affirmative action
- African American
- (List of) African-American abolitionists
- (List of) African-American astronauts
- African-American book publishers in the United States, 1960–80
- African-American church
- African American cinema
- African-American culture
- African-American culture and sexual orientation
- African-American dance
- (List of) African-American documentary films
- African-American English
- African-American family structure
- African-American Film Critics Association
- (List of) African-American firsts
- African-American hair
- African-American Heritage Sites (U.S. National Park Service)
- African-American history
- African-American Institute (Northeastern University)
- African-American inventors and scientists
- (List of) African-American jurists
- African-American literature
- (List of) African-American mathematicians
- (List of) African-American Medal of Honor recipients
- African-American middle class
- African American Military History Museum
- African American Museum in Philadelphia
- African American Museum of Iowa
- African American Museum of the Arts
- African-American music
- African-American musical theater
- African-American names
- African American National Biography Project
- African-American neighborhood
- African-American newspapers
- (List of) African-American officeholders during the Reconstruction
- African-American organized crime
- African American Policy Forum
- African-American Research Library and Cultural Center
- African American Review
- African-American studies
- (List of) African-American United States senators
- African-American Vernacular English
- African-American Woman Suffrage Movement
- African-American women in politics
- African-American Women for Reproductive Freedom
- (List of) African-American visual artists
- (Lists of) African Americans
- African Americans and the G.I. Bill
- African American Civil War Memorial
- African Americans at the Siege of Petersburg
- African Americans in Alabama
- African Americans in Atlanta
- African Americans in Baltimore
- African Americans in California
- African Americans in Chicago
- African Americans in Davenport, Iowa
- African Americans in France
- African Americans in Florida
- African Americans in France
- African Americans in Georgia (U.S. state)
- African Americans in Ghana
- African Americans in Kansas
- African Americans in Louisiana
- African Americans in Maryland
- African Americans in Mississippi
- African Americans in Missouri
- African Americans in New York City
- African Americans in North Carolina
- African Americans in Omaha, Nebraska
- African Americans in San Francisco
- African Americans in South Carolina
- African Americans in Texas
- African Americans in Tennessee
- African Americans in Utah
- African Americans in the United States Congress
- African American National Biography Project
- (List of) African-American Republicans
- African Blood Brotherhood
- African Burial Ground National Monument
- African Cemetery at Higgs Beach
- African Christian Union
- African diaspora
- African Hebrew Israelites of Jerusalem
- African Methodist Episcopal Church
- Africana philosophy
- Africana womanism
- Africans in Hawaii
- Africatown
- AfriCOBRA
- Afro
- Afro-American Cultural Center at Yale
- Afro-Academic, Cultural, Technological and Scientific Olympics
- Afro-American Historical and Genealogical Society
- Afro-American Museum of Pompano Beach
- Afro-American settlement in Africa
- Afrocentrism
- Afro-Cuban jazz
- Afrodite Superstar
- Afrofuturism
- Afro-punk
- Afro-Punk (film)
- Agana race riot
- Ain't I a Woman? (book)
- Ain't Supposed to Die a Natural Death
- Akeelah and the Bee
- Alabama A&M University
- Alabama Christian Movement for Human Rights
- Alabama Democratic Conference
- Alabama State University
- Albany State University
- Alcorn State University
- Alexander v. Holmes County Board of Education
- Alexandria Black History Museum
- All About You (film)
- All God's Children (film)
- All Power to the People
- All the Young Men
- Allen University
- Alliance of Black Jews
- Alpha Kappa Alpha sorority
- Alpha Phi Alpha fraternity
- American Black Film Festival
- American Black Upper Class
- American Civil War
- American Descendants of Slavery
- American Gangster (film)
- American Negro Academy
- American Negro Ballet Company
- American Negro Labor Congress
- American Negro Theater
- American Slavery As It Is
- American Society of African Culture
- American Society of Muslims
- American Tennis Association
- La Amistad
- Amos 'n' Andy
- An Act for the Gradual Abolition of Slavery
- And you are lynching Negroes
- Angola, Florida
- Ann Arbor Decision
- Another Country (novel)
- Anti-miscegenation laws in the United States
- Anti-Tom literature
- Antwone Fisher (film)
- A. Philip Randolph Institute
- Apollo Theater
- April Fools (2007 film)
- Archives of African American Music and Culture
- Are We Done Yet?
- Are We There Yet? (film)
- Apostolic Faith Mission Church of God
- University of Arkansas at Pine Bluff
- Arkansas Baptist College
- The Art Movements
- Artworks commemorating African-Americans in Washington, D.C.
- Aruba (film)
- Ashton Villa
- Ashworth family
- Jabari Asim
- Association of Black Photographers
- Association of Black Psychologists
- Association of Black Women Historians
- Association for the Study of African American Life and History
- At the Beach LA
- ATL (film)
- Atlanta Compromise
- Atlanta Conference of Negro Problems
- Atlanta Exposition Speech
- A.U.M.P. Church
- Aunt Phillis's Cabin
- Ausar Auset Society
- Ax Handle Saturday

== B ==
- BAADASSSSS!
- Baby Boy (film)
- Baby mama
- Backstreet Cultural Museum
- Back-to-Africa movement
- Bad Boys
- Bait (2000 film)
- Ball culture
- Bamboozled
- Band of Angels
- Banished (film)
- Banjee
- Banjo
- Barber-Scotia College
- Barbershop (film)
  - Barbershop 2: Back in Business
- Baseball color line
- Baton Rouge bus boycott
- Battle of Ambos Nogales
- Battle of Baxter Springs
- Battle of Bear Valley
- Battle of Beecher Island
- Battle of Black Jack
- Battle of Olustee
- Battle of Fort Pillow
- Battle of Poison Spring
- Battle of Saltville I
- Battle of Saltville II
- Battle of Fort Tularosa
- Battle of Negro Fort
- Battle of Osawatomie
- Battle of the Saline River
- Bayview-Hunters Point, San Francisco
- Beah: A Black Woman Speaks
- Beale Street Mama
- Bean pie
- Beatboxing
- A Beautiful Soul (film)
- Bebe's Kids
- Bebop
- Beecher's Bible
- Bell v. Maryland
- Belly (film)
- Beloved (1998 film)
- Benedict College
- Bennett College
- The Best Man (1999 film)
- BET Awards
- BET Her
- Bethel Literary and Historical Society
- Bethune–Cookman University
- The Betrayal (1948 film)
- Beyond the Down Low
- Big Ain't Bad
- Big band
- Big River (musical)
- Big Momma's House
- Biker Boyz
- Biloxi wade-ins
- The Bingo Long Traveling All-Stars & Motor Kings
- Bird (1988 film)
- Bishop State Community College
- Bishop College (historical)
- Black Americana
- Black American Princess
- Black American Racers Association
- Black American Sign Language
- List of black animated characters
- Black-appeal stations
- Black Arts Movement
- Black August (film)
- Black Autonomy Network Community Organization
- Black Betty
- Black billionaires
- Blackbirds of 1928
- Black and Blue (musical)
- Black Bottom
- Black Boy
- The Black Candle
- Black capitalism
- Black Catholicism
- Black church
- Black Coaches & Administrators
- (List of) Black college football classics
- Black Consciousness Movement
- Black conservatism
- Black conservatism in the United States
- Black cowboys
- Black Cultural Association
- Black Data Processing Associates
- Black Dispatches
- Black doll
- Black elite
- Black Enterprise
- Black Enterprise Business Report
- Black Entertainment and Sports Lawyers Association
- Black Entertainment Television
- Black existentialism
- Blackface
- Black Family Channel
- Black feminism
- Black Filmmakers Hall of Fame
- Black flight
- Black gay pride
- Black Hebrew Israelites
- Black Hispanic and Latino Americans
- Black History Month
- Black Inches
- Black Indians in the United States
- Black Intelligence Test of Cultural Homogeneity
- Black is Beautiful
- Black is... Black Ain't
- Black leftism
- Black Liberators
- Black Like Me
- Black Like Me (film)
- The Black List (film series)
- Black Lives Matter
- Black Loyalist
- Black Mafia
- Black Mafia Family
- The Black Man: His Antecedents, His Genius and His Achievements
- Black matriarchy
- Black mecca
- Black middle class
- Black Movie Awards
- Black Music Month
- Black nationalism
- Black orientalism
- Black Panther Party
- Black participation in college basketball
- BlackPast.org
- Black Patriot (American Revolution)
- Black Patti Records
- Black people
- Black people in Ireland
- Black Pioneers
- BlackPlanet
- Black players in American professional football
- Black populism
- Black Power
- Black Power and the American Myth
- Black Power movement
- Black pride
- Black psychology
- Black Radical Congress
- Black Reconstruction in America
- Black Reel Awards
- Black refugee (War of 1812)
- Black Rock Coalition
- The Black Scholar
- Black school
- Black science fiction
- Black Seminoles
- Black Seminole Scouts
- Black separatism
- Black sermonic tradition
- Black Sexual Politics: African Americans, Gender, and the New Racism
- Black sitcom
- Black Star Line
- Black supremacy
- Black Swan Records
- Black Theater of Ardmore
- Black theology
- Black Twitter
- Black Women Organized for Political Action
- The Black World Today
- Blacks and Jews (film)
- Blankman
- Blaxploitation
- Bleeding Kansas
- Bling-bling
- BLK (magazine)
- Blockbusting
- Block party
- The Blood of Jesus
- Bleeding Kansas
- Bloods
- Bluefield State University
- Blue Front Cafe
- Blue Hill Avenue (film)
- Blue note
- Blues
- Blues in the Night (musical)
- The Bluest Eye
- Board of Education of Oklahoma City v. Dowell
- Body and Soul (1925 film)
- Bones (2001 film)
- Bolling v. Sharpe
- Boogie-woogie
- Booker T. Washington Junior College
- Booker T. Washington National Monument
- Book of Love (2002 film)
- Book of Negroes
- Boomerang (1992 film)
- The Boondocks (comic strip)
- Booty Call (film)
- Bop (disambiguation)
- Bossip
- Bouie v. City of Columbia
- Bounce TV
- Bowie State University
- Boynton v. Virginia
- Boy! What a Girl!
- Boyz n the Hood
- Brass Ankles
- Tawana Brawley rape allegations
- Bread and Roses (disambiguation)
- Break (music)
- Breakin' All the Rules
- B-boying or breakdancing
- Br'er Rabbit
- Br'er Rabbit Earns a Dollar a Minute
- Briggs v. Elliott
- Bright Road
- Bring in 'da Noise, Bring in 'da Funk
- The Brute (1920 film)
- Bronner Bros.
- Brother John (film)
- Brother Martin: Servant of Jesus
- The Brothers (2001 film)
- Brotherhood of Sleeping Car Porters
- Browder v. Gayle
- Brown Paper Bag Test
- Brown v. Board of Education
- Brownsville affair
- Bubbling Brown Sugar
- Buchanan v. Warley
- Buck and the Preacher
- Bud Billiken Club
- Bud Billiken Parade and Picnic
- The Buffalo Saga
- Buffalo Soldier
- Bureau of Colored Troops
- Burlesque in Harlem
- Bush Mama
- Bushwhacker
- Bustin' Loose (film)
- Butler Medal

== C ==
- Cabin in the Sky (film)
- Cadillac Records
- Café Society
- Cakewalk
- California African American Museum
- Call and response
- Callaloo (journal)
- Cambridge, Maryland
- Camp Ashby
- Camp Lejeune Incident
- Camp Lockett
- Camp Nelson National Cemetery
- Canterbury Female Boarding School
- Carmel Indians
- Carmen: A Hip Hopera
- Carmen Jones
- Carmen Jones (film)
- Caught Up (film)
- Cave Canem Foundation
- CB4
- 4th Cavalry Regiment (United States)
- Central Brooklyn Jazz Consortium
- Central State University
- Char Room (film)
- Chavis family
- Cheyney University of Pennsylvania
- Cherrydale sit-ins
- Chesapeake pipes
- Chestnut Ridge people
- Chicago stepping
- Chief Buffalo Child Long Lance
- Children, Go Where I Send Thee
- Children of the plantation
- Chitlin circuit
- Chowanoke
- Christian Methodist Episcopal Church
- The Church of Saint Coltrane
- Civil Brand
- City Mission Society
- Civil Rights Act of 1866
- Civil Rights Act of 1875
- Civil Rights Act of 1957
- Civil Rights Act of 1960
- Civil Rights Act of 1964
- Civil Rights Cases
- Civil rights movement
- Civil rights movement (1865–1896)
- Civil rights movement (1896–1954)
- Civil rights movement in Omaha, Nebraska
- The Civil War (musical)
- Claflin University
- Clark Atlanta University
- Class Act
- Classical Theatre of Harlem
- Claudine (film)
- Clef Club
- Clinton Junior College
- Clockers (film)
- Clotel
- Clothing in the Ragtime Era
- Coach Carter
- Coahoma Community College
- Coalition of Black Trade Unionists
- Coeur d'Alene, Idaho labor confrontation of 1899
- Coffy
- Coleman Manufacturing Company
- Colfax massacre
- Colonial period of South Carolina
- Colonization Societies
- Color Adjustment
- Color blindness (race)
- The Color of Friendship (2000 film)
- Color line (civil rights issue)
- Colored
- Colored Episcopal Mission
- Colored Music Settlement School
- Colored National Labor Union
- Colored Soldiers Monument in Frankfort
- Colorism
- The Color Purple
- The Color Purple (musical)
- Colors Straight Up
- Columbia Air Center
- Combahee River Collective
- Come Back, Charleston Blue
- Coming to America
- Commitments (film)
- Common Burying Ground and Island Cemetery
- The Communist Party and African-Americans
- Community Reinvestment Act
- Composers of African descent
- Compromise of 1850
- Concordia College, Selma (historical)
- Congdon Street Baptist Church
- Congo Square
- Congressional Black Caucus
- Congress of Racial Equality
- The Conjure Woman
- Conk
- Connie's Inn
- Consolidation Coal Company (Iowa)
- Constellation (film)
- Constitution of Virginia
- Constitutional colorblindness
- Contemporary R&B
- The Cookout
- Cool (American Negro aesthetic)
- Cool jazz
- Cooley High
- Coon song
- Cooper v. Aaron
- Coppin State University
- Copp's Hill Burying Ground
- Coretta Scott King Award
- Cornbread, Earl and Me
- The Corner: A Year in the Life of an Inner-City Neighborhood
- Cornerstone Speech
- Cornrows
- The Cosby Show
  - (List of) The Cosby Show characters
- Cotton Club
- Cotton Club (Portland)
- Cotton Comes to Harlem
- Cotton Comes to Harlem (novel)
- The Council (drug syndicate)
- Council of Federated Organizations
- Coushatta massacre
- Cover (film)
- Crack epidemic
- Creole Giselle
- Creole music
- Creoles of color
- Criminal black man
- Crips
- The Crisis
- Crooklyn
- Crossover (2006 film)
- Crossroads Theatre
- Crunk
- Cultural mulatto
- Cumming v. Richmond County Board of Education
- Cyrus Gates Farmstead

== D ==
- D Underbelly
- Daddy's Little Girls
- Dancing for eels
- Dangerous Minds
- Daniel Payne College (historical)
- Dap greeting
- Dark Girls
- Darktown Revue
- Darlings of Rhythm
- A Daughter of the Congo
- Davis v. County School Board of Prince Edward County
- Deacons for Defense and Justice
- Death at an Early Age
- Death at a Funeral (2010 film)
- "Deep River" (song)
- Deep River Boys
- Def by Temptation
- Def Jam's How to Be a Player
- The Defiant Ones (film)
- Delaware State University
- Deliver Us from Eva
- Delta blues
- Delta Ministry
- Denmark Technical College
- Denmark Vesey House
- Department of African American Studies – Syracuse University
- DePorres Club
- Desdemona (play)
- Dese Bones G'wine Rise Again
- Desegregation
  - Desegregation busing in the United States
  - Desegregation in the United States Marine Corps
- Detroit Hair Wars
- Diary of a Mad Black Woman (film)
- Dillard University
- Directive 5120.36
- Dirty Gertie from Harlem U.S.A.
- Dirty Laundry (2007 film)
- Disappearing Acts
- Disfranchisement after Reconstruction era
- University of the District of Columbia
- District of Columbia Compensated Emancipation Act
- Dixieland
- Dobyville
- Dodge Revolutionary Union Movement
- Don't Be a Menace to South Central While Drinking Your Juice in the Hood
- Do-rag
- Double consciousness
- Double Dutch (jump rope)
- Double-duty dollar
- Double Jeopardy: To Be Black and Female
- Douglass Place
- Dozens (game)
- Dreadlocks
- Dreamgirls (film)
- Dred Scott v. Sandford
- Dr. Robert Walter Johnson House and Tennis Court
- Drum (1976 film)
- Drumline (film)
- Drums and Shadows
- The Duke Is Tops
- The Dungeon (1922 film)
- Dyer Anti-Lynching Bill
- Dysfunktional Family

== E ==
- East Coast hip hop
- East Oakland, Oakland, California
- Ebonics (word)
- Ebony (magazine)
- Edge of the City
- Education in Harlem
- Education outcomes in the United States by race and other classifications
- Edward Waters University
- Elaine massacre
- Elizabeth City State University
- Emancipation Oak
- Emancipation Proclamation
- Emmett Till
- Emmett Till Antilynching Act
- Encyclopedia of the Harlem Renaissance
- (List of) Enslaved people of Mount Vernon
- Equal Suffrage League (Brooklyn, New York)
- The Ernest Green Story
- Essence magazine
- Ethiopian Regiment
- "Every Time I Feel the Spirit" (song)
- Eve's Bayou
- Executive Order 8802
- Executive Order 9981
- Executive Order 11063
- The Exile (1931 film)
- Exodus of 1879
- Exodusters
- Expelled Because of Color
- Ex-slave repatriation
- Extra Mile Education Foundation
- Eyes on the Prize

== F ==
- The Fab Five (film)
- Fair Employment Practices Commission
- Fair Game (2005 film)
- Fat Albert and the Cosby Kids
- Faubourg Treme: The Untold Story of Black New Orleans
- Fayetteville State University
- Federal Council of Negro Affairs
- Federation of Black Cowboys
- Fela!
- Festival Sundiata
- Field holler
- Fifteenth Amendment to the United States Constitution
- The Fighting Temptations
- Finding Me
- Finding Me: Truth
- The Fire Next Time
- First African Baptist Church (Savannah, Georgia)
- First African Baptist Church (Lexington, Kentucky)
- First African Baptist Church (Richmond, Virginia)
- Fisk University
- The Five Heartbeats
- Five on the Black Hand Side
- Flight of the Red Tail
- Florida A&M Hospital
- Florida A&M University
- Florida Black Heritage Trail
- Florida Memorial University
- Florida Slavery Memorial
- Fodder on My Wings
- Folklore
- Foolish (film)
- For Colored Girls
- Forced into Glory: Abraham Lincoln's White Dream
- For Love of Ivy
- For Us the Living: The Medgar Evers Story
- Fort Gadsden
- Fort Howell
- Fort Pillow massacre
- Fort Pocahontas
- Fort Robert Smalls
- Fort Valley State University
- Forty acres and a mule
- Forty Acres and a Mule Filmworks
- Fountain Hughes
- Fourteenth Amendment to the United States Constitution
- Four Eleven Forty Four
- Freaknik
- Frederick Douglass and the White Negro
- Frederick Douglass National Historic Site
- Free African Society
- Freedman
- Freedman's Savings Bank
- Freedman's Village
- Freedmen (ethnic group)
- Freedmen's Aid Society
- Freedmen's Colony of Roanoke Island
- Freedmen's Bureau
- (List of) freedmen's towns
- Freedom Riders
- Freedom suits
- Freedom Summer
- Freedom Writers
- Free jazz
- Freeman (Colonial)
- Free Negro
- Free people of color
- Freeport Doctrine
- Free produce movement
- Free Soil Party
- Free-Stater (Kansas)
- Friday (1995 film)
- Friday After Next
- From Black Power to Hip Hop: Racism, Nationalism, and Feminism
- From Swastika to Jim Crow
- Fudge Farm
- Fugitive slave
- Fugitive Slave Act of 1793
- Fugitive Slave Act of 1850
- Funeral Procession (painting)
- Funk
- The Future of the American Negro
- The Future of the Race

== G ==
- Gadsden State Community College
- Gag rule
- Gamble Plantation Historic State Park
- Gang of Roses
- Gang system
- Gangsta rap
- Garveyism
- Gas (2004 film)
- Gebhart v. Belton
- Geer Cemetery
- Genius of Universal Emancipation
- George Washington and slavery
- Georgia Alliance of African American Attorneys
- Get down
- Get on the Bus
- A Get2Gether
- Ghetto fabulous
- Ghetto tourism
- Gibbs Junior College
- Gibson family (Virginia)
- Gillfield Baptist Church (Petersburg, Virginia)
- Giles v. Harris
- The Girl from Chicago
- The Girl in Room 20
- Glory (1989 film)
- Go Down, Death!
- Goffe Street Special School for Colored Children
- Go for Broke (2002 film)
- God's Step Children
- Golden age hip hop
- Golden Circle (proposed country)
- Golden Slippers
- Golden State Mutual Life Insurance Building
- Golden Thirteen
- Gold roll
- Go Man Go (film)
- A Good Day to Be Black and Sexy
- Good Deeds
- Good Fences
- Good Hair
- "Good Hair" and Other Dubious Distinctions
- Good hair (phrase)
- Good Times
- Gospel music
- Go Tell It on the Mountain (novel)
- Graffiti in the United States
- Grambling State University
- Grand Contraband Camp
- Greased Lightning
- Great Migration (African American)
- Great Plains Black History Museum
- Greek Picnic
- Green v. County School Board of New Kent County
- The Green Pastures (film)
- The Greensboro Four
- Greensboro sit-ins
- The Greenwood Encyclopedia of African American Folklore
- Griffin v. County School Board of Prince Edward County
- Griggs v. Duke Power Co.
- Grind (musical)
- Guadalupe College (historical)
- Guess Who (film)
- Guess Who's Coming to Dinner
- A Guest of Honor (opera)
- Guey Heung Lee v. Johnson
- Guinn v. United States
- Gullah
- Gullah language
- The Gunsaulus Mystery

== H ==
- Hair
- Hair Show
- Haliwa-Saponi
- Hallelujah! (film)
- Hallelujah, Baby!
- Hamitic League of the World
- Hampton Negro Conference
- Hampton University
- Hard bop
- Hardwood (film)
- The Harimaya Bridge
- Harlem Artists Guild
- Harlem Globetrotters
- The Harlem Globetrotters (film)
- Harlem Renaissance
- Harlem Riot of 1935
- Harlem Riot of 1943
- Harlem Riot of 1964
- Harlem Writers Guild
- Harriet Tubman
- Harriet Tubman National Historical Park
- Harris–Stowe State University
- 1941 Harvard–Navy lacrosse game
- Hate crime
- Hate group
- Hav Plenty
- Having Our Say: The Delany Sisters' First 100 Years
- Heart of Atlanta Motel v. United States
- Heat Wave (1990 film)
- The Hemingses of Monticello: An American Family
- Henderson v. United States (1950)
- Henry Browne, Farmer
- A Hero Ain't Nothin' but a Sandwich (film)
- Hey, Hey, Hey, It's Fat Albert
- Heyward Shepherd monument
- High Freakquency
- High yellow
- The Highwaymen (landscape artists)
- Hinds Community College at Utica
- Hip hop
- Hip-hop dance
- Hip hop music
- Hip hop production
- (African-American ) Historic Places
- Historically black colleges and universities
- History of African Americans in Atlanta
- History of African Americans in Boston
- History of African Americans in Chicago
- History of African Americans in Dallas-Ft. Worth
- History of African Americans in Detroit
- History of African Americans in Houston
- History of African Americans in Kansas
- History of African Americans in Los Angeles
- History of African Americans in Philadelphia
- History of African Americans in San Antonio
- History of African Americans in Texas
- History of African Americans in Utah
- History of Blacks in ice hockey
- History of the Jews in the African diaspora
- History of slavery in Alabama
- History of slavery in California
- History of slavery in Connecticut
- History of slavery in Georgia (U.S. state)
- History of slavery in Illinois
- History of slavery in Indiana
- History of slavery in Kentucky
- History of slavery in Louisiana
- History of slavery in Maryland
- History of slavery in Massachusetts
- History of slavery in New Jersey
- History of slavery in New York
- History of slavery in North Carolina
- History of slavery in Texas
- History of slavery in Virginia
- Hi-top fade
- Hitsville U.S.A.
- Hokum
- Hollywood Black Film Festival
- Hollywood Shuffle
- Home Girls
- The Homesteader
- Homo hop
- The Honeymooners (2005 film)
- Hood films
- Hoodoo (folk magic)
- Hookers In Revolt
- The House Behind the Cedars
- House dance
- House Negro
- House Part (film)
  - House Party 2
  - House Party 3
  - House Party 4: Down to the Last Minute
- Howard University
- How I Spent My Summer Vacation (1997 film)
- House slave
- How Stella Got Her Groove Back
- Huckleberry Finn
- Hully Gully
- Human Rights (journal)
- Hunter v. Erickson
- Hush harbor
- Hustle & Flow
- Huston–Tillotson University
- Hurston/Wright Legacy Award

== I ==
- "I, Too, Sing America"
- I Can Do Bad All By Myself (film)
- Idlewild, Michigan
- I Got the Hook Up
- Igbo American
- Igbo people in the Atlantic slave trade
- Imaging Blackness
- The Impending Crisis of the South
- I'm Through with White Girls (The Inevitable Undoing of Jay Brooks)
- Incidents in the Life of a Slave Girl
- Impact of the COVID-19 pandemic on African-American communities
- Indian cavalry
- Indian Rocks Dining Hall
- In the Heat of the Night (film)
- In the Heights
- The Inkwell
- In Living Color
- Institute Catholique
- Institute of the Black World
- Institute of the Black World 21st Century
- Institutional racism
- Interdenominational Theological Center
- International Association of Black Actuaries
- International Federation of Black Prides
- Interregional slave trade
- The Interruption of Everything
- Introducing Dorothy Dandridge
- Invisible churches (slavery)
- Invisible Man
- I Shall Not Be Moved
- Isle of Canes
- I Spy (1965 TV series)
- Is That Black Enough for You?!?
- It Ain't Nothin' But the Blues
- I Will Follow (film)

== J ==
- Jack and Jill (organization)
- Jackson State University
- Jailhouse Blues
- Jarvis Christian University
- Jason's Lyric
- Jayhawker
- Jazz
- Jazz (novel)
- Jazz funeral
- Jazz-funk
- Jazz fusion
- Jazz Profiles
- Jefferson–Hemings controversy
- The Jeffersons
- Jelly's Last Jam
- Jerkin'
- Jews in the civil rights movement
- J. F. Drake State Technical College
- Jheri curl
- J-Setting
- Jet (magazine)
- Jim Brown: All-American
- Jim Crow (character)
- Jim Crow economy
- Jim Crow laws
- (List of) Jim Crow law examples by State
- Jivin' in Be-Bop
- John Brown's last speech
- John Brown's Provisional Constitution
- John Brown's raid on Harpers Ferry
- John Henry (folklore)
- Johnny Bright incident
- Johnson C. Smith University
- Johnson Family Vacation
- The Josephine Baker Story
- Journal of African American History
- Journal of Black Psychology
- Journal of Black Studies
- Journal of Negro Education
- Journal of Negro History
- Journal of Pan African Studies
- Judicial aspects of race in the United States
- Juice (1992 film)
- Juke joint
- Juke Joint (1947 film)
- Julia (American TV series)
- Julian Scott Department Store
- Jump blues
- Jump In!
- Jumping the Broom
- Jumping the broom
- Jump Jim Crow
- Juneteenth
- Juneteenth in Oregon
- The Jungle (1967 film)
- Just Wright
- Justice for Victims of Lynching Act

== K ==
- Kalunga Line
- Kansas–Nebraska Act
- Karamu House
- Katherine Dunham Company
- Katzenbach v. McClung
- Kelly Ingram Park
- Kentucky in Africa
- Kentucky State University
- Kevin Hart's Guide to Black History
- A Key to Uncle Tom's Cabin
- The KIDflix Film Fest of Bed-Stuy
- King (TV miniseries)
- "Kingdom Coming"
- King's Ransom (film)
- Kissing Case
- Kitchen Table: Women of Color Press
- Kittrell College (historical)
- Knights of the Clock
- Knights of the Golden Circle
- Know Your History: Jesus Is Black; So Was Cleopatra
- Knoxville College
- Krumping
- Kufi
- Ku Klux Klan
- Kwanzaa

== L ==
- Lady Sings the Blues
- Lady Sings the Blues (film)
- Lakeview, Illinois
- LaLee's Kin: The Legacy of Cotton
- Lancaster County, Pennsylvania
- Lane College
- Langston Hughes Medal
- Langston University
- L.A. Rebellion
- The Last Angel of History
- Latin jazz
- Lawn jockey
- Lawrence, Kansas
- Lawson State Community College
- League of Revolutionary Black Workers
- League of Struggle for Negro Rights
- Lean on Me (film)
- The Learning Tree
- Leavenworth Constitution
- Lecompton Constitution
- Legacy (2000 film)
- Leland College (historical)
- Helen Lemme
- LeMoyne–Owen College
- LeRoy Battle
- Let's Do It Again (1975 film)
- Letters to a Young Brother
- Lewis College of Business
- Liberia
- The Liberator (anti-slavery newspaper)
- Liberty Party (United States, 1840)
- Life and Times of Frederick Douglass
- Life as a BlackMan
- "Lift Every Voice and Sing"
- Abraham Lincoln's Lyceum address
- Abraham Lincoln's Peoria speech
- Lincoln's Lost Speech
- Lincoln–Douglas debates
- Lincoln Motion Picture Company
- Lincoln University of Missouri
- Lincoln University of Pennsylvania
- Linconia
- Lindy Hop
- Linewatch
- The Links, Incorporated
- Literacy tests
- List of monuments to African Americans
- Little Rock Nine
- Livingstone College
- Livin' Large
- Logan family (historical)
- Walter P. Lomax Jr.
- Long Look Estate
- 1992 Los Angeles riots
- Losing the Race
- The Lost Man
- Louisiana African American Heritage Trail
- Louisiana Creole French
- Louisiana Voodoo
- Louisiana v. United States (1965)
- Love (Toni Morrison novel)
- Love Chronicles (film)
- Love Don't Cost a Thing (film)
- Loving v. Virginia
- A Low Down Dirty Shame
- Lying Lips
- Lynching
- Lynching of John Henry James

== M ==
- Maafa
- Maafa 21
- Madame Rentz's Female Minstrels
- Madea's Big Happy Family (film)
- Madea's Family Reunion
- Magical Negro
- Mahaffie House
- Mahogany (film)
- The Making of Robert E. Lee
- Malcolm X (film)
- Mama, I Want to Sing! (film)
- Mammy archetype
- Manumission Intelligencier
- Marais des Cygnes massacre
- The March (1964 film)
- March on Washington Movement
- Marching On!
- Marci X
- Marijuana
- Marcus Garland
- Marcus Garvey: Look for me in the Whirlwind
- Margaret Garner (opera)
- Marian Anderson: the Lincoln Memorial Concert
- Martin Luther King, Jr. Day
- Mary Ann Shadd Cary House
- Maryland Constitution of 1864
- Mary Don't You Weep
- University of Maryland Eastern Shore
- Mississippi-in-Africa
- Maryland State Colonization Society
- Mason County, Kentucky slave pen
- Mason–Dixon line
- USS Mason (DE-529)
- Massachusetts General Colored Association
- Mass racial violence in the United States
- M-Base
- McComas Institute
- McDonnell Douglas Corp. v. Green
- McDonogh Three
- McGill family (Monrovia)
- McLaurin v. Oklahoma State Regents
- M.Dia
- Meat packing industry
- Media Take Out
- Meeting David Wilson
- Meet the Browns (film)
- Meharry Medical College
- Melungeon
- Memphis (musical)
- Menace II Society
- Mendez v. Westminster
- A Mercy
- Mestiza Double Consciousness
- Memorials to Martin Luther King Jr.
- The Meteor Man (film)
- Middle Passage
- Midnight Ramble (film)
- Miles College
- Miles of Smiles, Years of Struggle
- Military history of African Americans
- Military history of African Americans in the American Civil War
- Militia Act of 1862
- Milliken v. Bradley
- Million Man March
- Millions More Movement
- Minstrel show
- Miscegenation
- Misogyny in hip hop culture
- Miss Ann
- Miss Black America
- Missing white woman syndrome
- Mississippi Blues Trail
- Mississippi Burning
- Mississippi Damned
- Mississippi Freedom Democratic Party
- Mississippi Valley State University
- Missouri Compromise
- Missouri ex rel. Gaines v. Canada
- Mister Charlie
- Mitchelville
- Mo' Better Blues
- MoCADA
- Modal jazz
- Mojo (African-American culture)
- Mo' Money
- Monacan people
- Montage of a Dream Deferred
- Montgomery bus boycott
- Montgomery Improvement Association
- Moore v. Dempsey
- Moorish Orthodox Church of America
- Moorish Science Temple of America
- Morehouse College
- Morehouse School of Medicine
- Morgan State University
- Morris Brown College
- Morris College
- Mosaic Templars Cultural Center
- Mother African Methodist Episcopal Zion Church
- Motherland (2010 film)
- Motown
- Motown Productions
- Motown Records
- Moulin Rouge Hotel
- Mount Auburn Cemetery (Baltimore, Maryland)
- Mount Hermon Female Seminary (historical)
- Mount Moor African-American Cemetery
- Mount Oread
- MOWA Band of Choctaw Indians
- MPG: Motion Picture Genocide
- Mudsill theory
- Le Mulâtre
- Mulatto
- Mumbo Jumbo (novel)
- Muncy Abolition Riot of 1842
- Murder in Harlem
- The Murder of Fred Hampton
- Murray v. Pearson
- (List of) Museums focused on African Americans
- Mutiny on the Amistad: The Saga of a Slave Revolt and Its Impact on American Abolition, Law, and Diplomacy
- Mutual Black Network
- My Bondage and My Freedom
- My Nappy Roots: A Journey Through Black Hair-itage
- My Past Is My Own
- Mytown (organization)

== N ==
- NAACP Image Awards
- NAACP in Kentucky
- NAACP Theatre Awards
- Nadir of American race relations
- Nansemond
- Nashville Convention
- Nashville sit-ins
- Nassau Plantation (Texas)
- Nasty C
- Nasty C discography
- Natchez Museum of African American History and Culture
- Nation of Islam
- National Abolition Hall of Fame and Museum
- National Action Network
- National African American Archives and Museum
- National African American Leadership Summit
- National Afro-American Council
- National Afro-American League
- The National Alliance of Black School Educators
- National Anti-Slavery Standard
- National Association for the Advancement of Colored People
- National Association for the Advancement of Colored People v. Alabama
- National Association of Black Accountants
- The National Association of Blacks in Criminal Justice
- National Association of Black Journalists
- National Association for Black Veterans
- National Association of Colored Women
- National Baptist Convention, USA, Inc.
- National Black Antiwar Antidraft Union
- National Black Caucus of State Legislators
- National Black Chamber of Commerce
- National Black Child Developmental Institute
- National Black Family Reunion
- National Black Farmers Association
- National Black Feminist Organization
- National Black Law Students Association
- National Black MBA Association
- National Black Network
- National Black Nurses Association
- National Black Police Association (United States)
- National Black Republican Association
- National Black United Front
- National Black United Fund
- National Brotherhood of Workers of America
- National Center of Afro-American Artists
- National Civil Rights Museum
- National Coalition of 100 Black Women
- National Coalition of Black Lesbians and Gays
- National Colored Base Ball League
- National Conference of Black Lawyers
- National Council of Negro Women
- National Equal Rights League
- National Medical Association
- The National Memorial for Peace and Justice
- National Museum of African American History and Culture
- National Museum of African American Music
- National Negro Business League
- National Negro Committee
- National Negro Congress
- National Negro Labor Council
- National Organization of Black Women in Law Enforcement
- National Organization for the Professional Advancement of Black Chemists and Chemical Engineers
- National Pan-Hellenic Council
- National Society of Black Engineers
- National Urban League
- National Youth Movement
- National Welfare Rights Organization
- Native Son
- Nat Turner's slave rebellion
- Negro
- Negro American League
- Negro Digest
- Negro Factories Corporation
- Negro Fort
- Negro league baseball
- The Negro Motorist Green Book
- Negro Mountain
- Negro National League (1920–1931)
- Negro National League (1933–1948)
- The Negro in the South
- The Negro Speaks of Rivers
- The Negro Star
- Negro World
- Neighborhoods
- Neo-soul
- The Network for Better Futures
- New Communities
- New England Anti-Slavery Society
- New England Emigrant Aid Company
- New Great Migration
- New Jack City
- New jack swing
- New Jersey Drive
- The Negro Soldier
- The New Jim Crow
- The New Negro
- New Orleans African American Museum
- New South
- New-York Central College
- New York Conspiracy of 1741
- New York Manumission Society
- Next Friday
- Niagara Falls Underground Railroad Heritage Center
- Niagara Movement
- Nigga
- Nigger
- Niggertown Marsh
- Night Catches Us
- Nixon v. Condon
- Nixon v. Herndon
- Nkiru Center for Education and Culture
- No Crossover: The Trial of Allen Iverson
- No Way Out (1950 film)
- Noah's Arc: Jumping the Broom
- Nora's Hair Salon
  - Nora's Hair Salon 2: A Cut Above
- Norbit
- Norfolk State University
- North Carolina A&T State University
- North Carolina Central University
- Northern Student Movement
- Norwood v. Harrison
- Nothin' 2 Lose
- Notorious (2009 film)
- The Notorious Elinor Lee
- Noyes Academy
- The Nutty Professor (1996 film)
  - Nutty Professor II: The Klumps

== O ==
- Oakville, Alabama
- Oakwood University
- Oberlin–Wellington Rescue
- Ocoee massacre
- Of One Blood (film)
- Olathe, Kansas
- Old City Cemetery (Lynchburg, Virginia)
- Old West Baltimore Historic District
- Ol' Man River
- Omaha Star
- Omega Psi Phi
- Once Upon a Time...When We Were Colored
- One-drop rule
- One More River to Cross (book)
- One People's Project
- Oneida Institute
- Opportunity (journal)
- Orangeburg massacre
- The Organization (film)
- Organization of Afro-American Unity
- Original 33
- Origins of the American Civil War
- Origins of the blues
- Origins of rock and roll
- Ostend Manifesto
- Othermother
- Oui Be Negroes
- Our Nig
- Out-of-Sync
- The Outsider (Wright novel)

== P ==
- Pacific Movement of the Eastern World
- The Pact (2008 film)
- Paine College
- Pan-African colors
- Pan-African flag
- Pan-Africanism
- Pan-African Film Festival
- Paper bag party
- Paradise (Morrison novel)
- Paradise Park, Florida
- Parents Involved in Community Schools v. Seattle School District No. 1
- Paris Blues
- Partus sequitur ventrem
- Passing (racial identity)
- Passing Strange (musical)
- A Patch of Blue
- Patting juba
- Paul Mooney: Analyzing White America
- Paul Robeson: Tribute to an Artist
- Paul Quinn College
- PeaceOUT World Homo Hop Festival
- Pearl incident
- Peculiar institution
- Peg Leg Joe
- Pennsylvania Abolition Society
- Peoples Temple
- The Perfect Holiday
- Perry massacre
- Personal liberty laws
- Person of color
- Peters-Graham House
- Petition of Free Negroes
- Phat Beach
- Philander Smith University
- Philipsburg Proclamation
- Philosophia Africana
- Phylon
- Pick Up the Mic
- A Piece of the Action (film)
- Piedmont Sanatorium
- Pinkster
- Pioneers of African-American Cinema
- Pipe Dreams (1976 film)
- Piscataway v. Taxman
- Plantocracy
- Playhouse Theatre (Seattle)
- Political hip hop
- Political views of Paul Robeson
- Polly (1989 film)
- Pomo Afro Homos
- Porgy and Bess
- Porgy and Bess (film)
- The Portal (community center)
- Port Chicago disaster
- Portrayal of black people in comics
- Port Royal Experiment
- Post-blackness
- Post-bop
- Post–Civil Rights Era African-American history
- Post Traumatic Slave Syndrome: America's Legacy of Enduring Injury and Healing
- Pottawatomie massacre
- Pottawatomie Rifles
- Pound Cake speech
- Powell v. Alabama
- Prairie Mission
- Prairie View A&M University
- Prayer kettle
- Preacher's Kid (film)
- The Preacher's Wife
- Premium (film)
- President's Committee on Civil Rights
- Pressure Point (1982 film)
- Pride (2007 film)
- Princess Tam Tam
- Progressive Farmers and Household Union of America
- Project 21
- Project Brotherhood
- Proslavery
- Provisional Constitution (John Brown)
- Pullman Company
- Punks (film)
- Purlie
- Purple drank

== Q ==
- Quantrill's Raiders
- The Quiet One (film)
- Quiet storm
- Quindaro Townsite
- The Quorum

== R ==
- Race & Class
- Race and crime in the United States
- Race and ethnicity in the NBA
- Race and ethnicity in the United States Census
- Race movie
- Race record
- Racial integration
- Racial Integrity Act of 1924
- Racial liberalism era
- Racial segregation
- Racial segregation in Atlanta
- Racial segregation in the United States
- Racial steering
- Category:Racially motivated violence against African Americans
- Racism in the United States
- Raid at Combahee Ferry
- Racism in the United States
- A Rage in Harlem (film)
- Ragtime
- Ragtime (musical)
- Raid at Combahee Ferry
- Rainbow Coalition (Fred Hampton)
- Rainbow/PUSH
- The Rainbow Sign
- Raisin (musical)
- A Raisin in the Sun
- A Raisin in the Sun (1961 film)
- A Raisin in the Sun (2008 film)
- Rapping
- Rawdon Street Methodist Church
- Ray (film)
- Rebecca's Revival
- Recitatif
- Red Ball Express
- Redbone (ethnicity)
- Red Summer of 1919
- Red Tail Project
- Red Tail Reborn
- Regional Council of Negro Leadership
- Religion of Black Americans
- Rent party
- Reparations for slavery
- Representation of African Americans in media
- Representations of African Americans in movies
- Republic of Maryland
- Republic of New Afrika
- Resignation of Shirley Sherrod
- Restrictive covenant
- Reverse freedom rides
- Reverse Underground Railroad
- Revolution '67
- Revolutionary integrationism
- Rhythm and blues
- Ride (1998 film)
- Ride with the Devil (film)
- The Rights of All
- Ring shout
- River Road African American Museum
- Rivers Wash Over Me
- Riverside School (Elkins, West Virginia)
- Rize (film)
- Roanoke Island
- Roger Williams College (historical)
- Roll Bounce
- Roots: The Saga of an American Family
  - Roots (1977 miniseries)
  - Roots: The Next Generations
  - Roots: The Gift
- Rosenwald Schools
- Rosewood massacre
- Rough Crossings
- Roxbury Film Festival
- Rubyfruit Jungle
- Rufus Jones for President
- Runaway slave
- Runyon v. McCrary
- Rust College

== S ==
- Sacking of Lawrence
- Sagging (fashion)
- Saint Paul's College (historical)
- The Salon (film)
- Salsa Soul Sisters
- Salute (2008 film)
- Sambo (racial term)
- Sampling (music)
- Samuel Osgood House
- Sanankuya
- Sanford and Son
- Sarah Keys v. Carolina Coach Company
- Savannah State University
- Scat singing
- School Daze
- Scottsboro Boys
- The Scottsboro Boys (musical)
- S-Curl
- Schomburg Center for Research in Black Culture
- Second Great Migration (African American)
- Second line (parades)
- The Secret of Selling the Negro Market
- Secret Six
- Seddity
- Segregated prom
- Selma University
- Separate Car Act
- Sepia Cinderella
- Set de flo'
- Seventeen Again
- Sexual slavery
- Shaw University
- Shelton State Community College
- Sherman's Special Field Orders, No. 15
- She's Gotta Have It
- Shields Green
- Shotgun house
- Show Boat
- Show Boat (1929 film)
- Show Boat (1936 film)
- Show Boat (1951 film)
- Show Boat (novel)
- Showtime at the Apollo
- Showtime Steppers
- Shuckin' and jivin'
- Shuffle Along
- Shuttlesworth v. Birmingham
- Siege of Charleston Union order of battle
- Sierra Leone Company
- (List of) singers
- Signifyin'
- Signifying monkey
- Silent Parade
- Sit-in
- Sister Wife
- Skirmish at Island Mound
- The Ski Trip
- Slater Fund
- 1733 slave insurrection on St. John
- 1842 Slave Revolt in the Cherokee Nation
- Slave breeding in the United States
- The Slave Community
- Slave and free states
- The Slave's Friend
- Slave health on American plantations
- Slave insurance in the United States
- Slave name
- Slave narrative
- Slave patrol
- Slave Power
- Slave rebellion
- Slave Trade Act of 1794
- Slavery
- Slavery and the Making of America
- Slaveryinamerica
- Slavery among Native Americans in the United States
- Slavery during the American Civil War
- Slavery in the colonial United States
- Slavery in the United States
- Slow drag (dance)
- Slow jam
- Smalls Paradise
- Smith v. Allwright
- Smith's Fly Boys
- Smooth jazz
- Snap music
- Snow Hill Site
- Snow on tha Bluff
- Society for the Prevention of Calling Sleeping Car Porters "George"
- "Sometimes I Feel Like a Motherless Child"
- Songs of the Underground Railroad
- Song of Solomon (novel)
- Songs of My People
- A Son of Satan
- Sons of Haiti
- Soul!
- Soul food
- Soul Food (film)
- Soul jazz
- Soul music
- Soul of the Game
- Soul Plane
- Soul Train
- Soundtrack for a Revolution
- South Carolina State University
- Southern Claims Commission
- South Pacific (musical)
- Southern University at New Orleans
- Southern University at Shreveport
- Southern University and A&M College
- Southwestern Christian College
- Space Jam
- Sparkle (2012 film)
- Speed-Dating
- Spelman College
- Spingarn Medal
- The Spirit Moves
- Spiritual (music)
- Spoken word
- The Spook Who Sat by the Door (film)
- The Spook Who Sat by the Door (novel)
- "Stagger Lee" (song)
- The Star of Ethiopia
- State of the Black Union
- St. Augustine's University
- Stepping (African-American)
- Steppin: The Movie
- Stereotypes of African Americans
- Stick dance (African-American)
- Still I Rise: A Cartoon History of African Americans
- Stillman College
- St. Mary's Beneficial Society Hall (Upper Marlboro, Maryland)
- St. Mary's Honor Ctr. v. Hicks
- Stomp the Yard
  - Stomp the Yard 2: Homecoming
- Stono Rebellion
- Storer College (historical)
- Storytelling
- St. Philip's College (United States)
- "Strange Fruit"
- Strapped
- Street Fight (film)
- Stride piano
- Strivers' Row
- (List of black) superheroes
- Student African American Brotherhood
- Student Nonviolent Coordinating Committee
- The Sugar Babies
- Sugar Chile Robinson, Billie Holiday, Count Basie and His Sextet
- Sula (novel)
- Sundown town
- Superspade
- Supreme Team (gang)
- Swann v. Charlotte-Mecklenburg Board of Education
- Sweet Honey in the Rock: Raise Your Voice
- Sweet sorghum
- Sweet Sweetback's Baadasssss Song
- Swing!
- "Swing Low, Sweet Chariot"
- Swing (jazz performance style)
- Swing music

== T ==
- Take a Giant Step
- Take This Hammer (film)
- The talk (racism in the United States)
- Talladega College
- Tallahassee bus boycott
- The Talented Tenth
- Talkin' Dirty After Dark
- Tantiusques
- Tap dance
- Tar baby
- Tar Baby (novel)
- Tennessee State University
- Texas College
- Texas Slavery Project
- Texas Southern University
- That's Black Entertainment
- Their Eyes Were Watching God
  - Their Eyes Were Watching God (film)
- They Call Me MISTER Tibbs!
- Thicker than Water (1999 film)
- A Thin Line Between Love and Hate
- Thirteenth Amendment to the United States Constitution
- This Christmas (film)
- This Bridge Called My Back
- This Is the Life (2008 film)
- Three Can Play That Game
- Three-Fifths Compromise
- Thurgood Marshall College Fund
- Timeline of African-American history
- Timeline of the civil rights movement
- Timeline of racial tension in Omaha, Nebraska
- Time on the Cross: The Economics of American Negro Slavery
- Tobacco marketing and African Americans
- Tobacco and Slaves: The Development of Southern Cultures in the Chesapeake, 1680–1800
- Tongues Untied
- Topeka Constitution
- To Sir, with Love
- Tougaloo College
- Traci Townsend
- Tradition Is a Temple
- Traditional black gospel
- Transition Magazine
- Trash talk
- A Treatise on the Patriarchal, or Co-operative System of Society
- Treatment of the enslaved in the United States
- Treemonisha
- Trenholm State Technical College
- Tresillo (rhythm)
- Triple oppression
- Trippin' (film)
- Trois
  - Trois 2: Pandora's Box
  - Trois 3: The Escort
- Tulsa race massacre
- Tuskegee & Its People
- Tuskegee Airmen
- The Tuskegee Airmen
- Tuskegee Airmen National Historic Site
- Tuskegee University
- Tutnese
- Twelfth Street YMCA Building
- Twelve Years a Slave
- Tyson (1995 film)

== U ==
- Uncle Jasper's Will
- Uncle Remus
- Uncle Tom
- Uncle Tom's Cabin
- Underground Railroad
- United Negro College Fund
- United Pentecostal Council of the Assemblies of God, Incorporated
- United States National Slavery Museum
- United States v. The Amistad
- United States v. Cruikshank
- United States Colored Troops
- (List of) United States Colored Troops Civil War units
- (List of) U.S. communities with African-American majority populations
- (List of) U.S. counties with African American majority populations
- (List of) U.S. metropolitan areas with large African-American populations
- United States v. Johnson (1968)
- United States v. Montgomery County Board of Education
- Unity Day (Philadelphia)
- Unity Fellowship Church Movement
- Universal Negro Improvement Association and African Communities League
- Up from Slavery
- Uptown Saturday Night
- Uptown Theater (Philadelphia)
- Urban Bush Women
- Urban contemporary music
- Urban contemporary gospel
- Urban fiction
- The urbanization of blacks in America
- US Organization
- USS Kitty Hawk riot
- USS PC-1264

== V ==
- Vanguard Justice Society
- Veiled Aristocrats
- (List of black) video game characters
- The Virgin of the Seminole
- University of the Virgin Islands
- Virginia State University
- Virginia Union University
- Virginia University of Lynchburg
- The Voice of the Negro
- Voorhees University
- Voter Education Project
- Voting Rights Act
- Voting rights in the United States
- Vogue (dance)

== W ==
- Wages of Sin (1929 film)
- Waist Deep
- Waiting to Exhale
- Walkaround
- The Wanderer (slave ship)
- A Warm December
- Fenwick Henri Watkins
- Watson v. Fort Worth Bank & Trust
- Watts Riots
- "The Weary Blues"
- Weaver family (Virginia)
- Welcome Home Roscoe Jenkins
- We-Sorts
- West Indian American
- West Coast hip hop
- West Oakland, Oakland, California
- West Virginia State University
- Western University (Kansas) (historical)
- Weyanoke, Virginia
- What's Love Got to Do with It (film)
- When Men Betray (1929 film)
- The White Negro
- Whiteface (performance)
- White guilt
- Who's the Man?
- Who's Your Caddy?
- Why Did I Get Married Too?
- Why Did I Get Married?
- Why Do Fools Fall in Love (film)
- Why I Hate Abercrombie and Fitch
- Why We Bang
- Wigger
- Wilberforce University
- Wiley University
- Wilfandel
- William Lynch speech
- Williams v. Mississippi
- William and Mary Hosmer House
- William E. Harmon Foundation award for distinguished achievement among Negroes
- Winks Panorama
- Winston-Salem State University
- With or Without You (2003 film)
- The Wiz
- The Wiz (film)
- A Woman Called Moses
- Womanist theology
- Women of Color Policy Network
- Women's Political Council
- Woo (film)
- The Wood
- Working With the Hands
- Work song
- Wyandotte Constitution

== X ==
- Xavier University of Louisiana

== Y ==
- Henry Clay Yerger
- Youngblood (1978 film)
- Young Boys Inc.
- Young, Gifted and Black
- "You've Got to Be Carefully Taught"

== Z ==
- Zephaniah Kingsley
- Zoodio
- Zora Neale Hurston House
- Zora Neale Hurston Museum of Fine Arts
- Zouzou (film)
