= Isis Rodriguez =

American painter

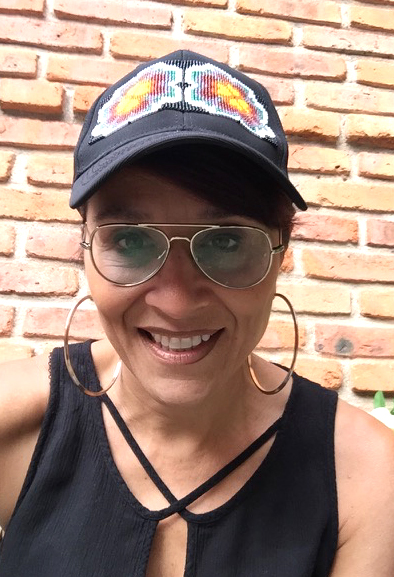
Isis Rodriguez Portrait

Lilly Marie Rodriguez, known by her artist name Isis Rodríguez, is an American contemporary painter who uses the cartoon as a conceptual tool to explore women's empowerment and liberation. Combining classical realism with the contemporary influences of cartoons, tattoos, and graffiti, her work bridges high and low art. Her hybrid style expresses new possibilities for female identity and spirituality. Judy Chicago and Edward Lucie Smith highlight Rodriguez as one of the few female artists to ever discuss the sex industry in her work and Sherri Cullison includes Rodriguez among the most noteworthy American women artists of the 20th century.

Rodríguez has exhibited work in numerous solo and group shows in the United States, Mexico, and Argentina, including Bay Area Now in San Francisco and the Festival Internacional Cervantino in Guanajuato. Her art is featured in two documentaries: Blind Eye to Justice: HIV+ Women in California's Prisons (Carol Leigh, 1998) and Live Nude Girls Unite! (Julia Query, 2000).

== Genre ==
Rodriguez has been called both a feminist and a Chicana. In Women and Art: Contested Territory, Judy Chicago and Edward Lucie Smith emphasize Rodriguez' feminist message, and Mix: Independent Art and Culture called her a "cultural sniper for the feminist movement". Chican@ Art Magazine featured her art on the cover of its Fall 2006 edition, and Lowrider Arte called her "the closest thing to a Chicana cartoon goddess that you'll find living in Alta California".

On her website, however, Rodriguez identifies herself in depoliticized terms using Gloria Anzaldúa's term mestiza: "a woman of mixed race who synthesizes multiple cultural and artistic influences".

== Style ==
Rodriguez' art is sexual, sometimes graphically so. Sherri Cullison says of Rodriguez' work: "Isis feels she is free to use her privilege to tease, and she does it with acrylic electroshock therapy conceived in true street-level, riot grrl style". Judy Chicago says of Rodriguez' 1996 painting "No More" (a nude woman with a snarling tiger emerging from her vagina): "[W]hile being able to celebrate the freedom of younger women artists like Isis Rodriguez, I have to… acknowledge the discomfort that this image causes me."

Rodriguez' art is highly symbolic. Often, her paintings redefine traditional symbols. When a male reporter from Despertar de Oaxaca criticized Rodriguez' use of ski masks in her series "La Mujer Enmascarada", assuming it was an anachronic reference to zapatismo, Rodriguez countered, "[T]he mask depends on your history and your personal experience. Maybe to you it represents zapatismo, but to an Esquimo it represents protection from the cold." In 1999 Rodriguez told Artsy, "What interests me about my art is the creation of a female language made up of symbols and images in the hopes of establishing a woman's voice without any apologies."

Another hallmark of Rodriguez' art is her frequent use of cartoons. In her early work, underground-style cartoons allow Rodriguez to make satirical commentaries about women's issues. A good example is the painting "Freedom" from the series "My Life as a Comic Stripper" that pokes fun at the "Madonna/Whore complex": a cartoon exotic dancer fantasizing about the Virgen de Guadalupe and a Harley Davidson, while male cartoon patrons such as Homer Simpson, Krusty the Clown, and Scooby Doo shower her with cash.

In her later paintings, Rodriguez uses cartoons conceptually, rather than satirically. The oil and pastel series "Enter With Discretion" (previously called "La Mujer Enmascarada"), features a realistically painted woman accompanied by a cartoon girl, challenging traditional distinctions between "high" and "low" art. In Rodriguez' artist statement, she says: "The cartoon is an elegant, minimalistic drawing of the realistic figure, and the realistic figure is just an over-rendered cartoon."

She also mentions that cartoons have a spiritual symbolism: "Cartoons can guide us toward our inner fantasies, where we often retreat to cope with our conflicts."

== Art and Activism ==
While living in San Francisco, Rodriguez worked as an exotic dancer with several strip clubs, including the Lusty Lady, Century Theatre, Mitchell Brothers, and the Crazy Horse. Many of her early paintings criticize the strip club industry for its materialism and exploitation. Rodriguez donated use of her painting "Be All You Can Be" (a satirical army ad spoofing women's limited gender roles) to the stripper rights organization Live Nude Girls Unite, which fought to reduce club stage fees and mandate safe working conditions for dancers. She was one of more than 500 plaintiffs in the 1994 class action lawsuit against the Mitchell Brothers, which was settled in the dancers' favor for $2.85 million in 1998.

== Biography ==
Rodriguez was born in Los Angeles, California, and raised in Topeka, Kansas. She is the daughter of a Puerto Rican mother and a Mexican father.

Rodriguez earned a bachelor of fine arts in painting from the University of Kansas in 1988 and went on to study for a year at the San Francisco Art Institute.

Rodriguez lived in San Francisco until 2008, when she moved to Mexico. She currently lives in San Miguel de Allende, Guanajuato, Mexico.

== Works ==
- 1997: "My Life As A Comic Stripper." This satirical series of gouache, acrylic, and ink cartoons is an activist's perspective on women's bodies and identities, as seen through the lens of San Francisco's strip club industry.
- 2005-2016: "Re-Diving Eve": In this series Isis uses a female, white cartoon image, reminiscent of Walt Disney style, to play the part of Eve, from the Adam and Eve story. Rodriguez has conceptually placed her in a moonlit dark paradise, surrounded by symbols from "The Original Sin". However, the Eve depicted here is free of blame, guilt, and shame, shown with an easy smile and soft eyes.
- 2006: "Glyphtoons". This series of acrylic and ink drawings on paper shows imagery related to exotic dancing, but unlike Rodriguez' earlier work, the series is introspective rather than activist.
- 2008-Current: "Enter with Discretion". Continuing on an introspective, spiritual note, the oils and pastel paintings in this show feature a woman in a ski mask, lingerie, and other guises, moving through a space of darkness that Rodriguez calls nepantla, a state of spiritual transition and conflict.

== Comics ==
Rodriguez is the co-author with Alfonso López de Anda of independent bilingual comic series Niñají. The comic was inspired by the Oaxacan legend of Donají, a princess who died in a war between the Mixtecs and the Zapotecs. Niñají tells the story of a pre-Hispanic princess who is assassinated in a conflict between rival shamans, then reborn 500 years later to share her indigenous values with modern Mexico. "What makes our comic very special is the fact that it is spiritually based, from an indigenous perspective", Rodriguez told the San Miguel de Allende newspaper Atención.

== Exhibitions ==
- 2015 "Los Resplandores." El Faro Centro Cultural, San Miguel de Allende, Guanajuato, Mexico.
- 2012 "Domestic Disobedience: Redefining the Feminine Space." San Diego Mesa College Art Gallery, San Diego, California, United States.
- 2010 "Child's Play." Triton Museum of Art, San Jose, California, United States.
- 2010 "Anotomía: Renewed Independence." Mission Cultural Center for Latino Arts, San Francisco, California, United States.
- 2008 "La mujer enmascarada." El Espacio de La Curtiduria, Oaxaca, Mexico.
- 2008 "Insurrectas y Estridentes en México a 100 años de Simone de Beauvoir." El Festival Internacional Cervantino, Guanajuato, Mexico.
- 2008 "Subjected Culture Interruptions and Resistances on Femaleness." Fondo Nacional de las Artes, Buenos Aires and Museo de Arte Contemporáneo de Rosario, Argentina.
- 2007 "Drawings-Visions, Surfaces and Beyond." Triton Museum, Santa Clara, California, United States.
- 2006 "Glyphtoons." Patricia Correia Gallery, Santa Monica, California, United States.
- 2005 "Sociedad de Vida." Steven Wolf Fine Arts Gallery, San Francisco, California, United States.
- 2003 "Brave New Girl." Flanders Gallery, Minneapolis, Minnesota, United States.
- 2002 "Hysterical Girl." Davidson Gallery, Seattle, Washington, United States.
- 2002 "Toys in Babeland." Richmond Art Center, Richmond, California, United States.
- 2002 "Fight Like A Girl!" Arts Benicia, Benicia, California, United States.
- 1999 "The Adventures of Betty Ramirez & Little Miss Attitude." MACLA, San Jose, CA
- 1999 "Piecing It Together: A Visual Journal." San Jose Museum of Art and McPherson Center, San Jose, California, United States.
- 1999 "Dangerous Dolls." Roc la Rue, Seattle, Washington, United States.
- 1999 "Secret Language of Girl." The Lab, San Francisco, California, United States.
- 1997 "Tweakville: A Bi-Coastal Exhibition Exploring the World of the Psychologically Frenetic." Catherine Clark Gallery, San Francisco, California, United States.
- 1997 "Bay Area Now." Center for the Arts Yerba Buena Gardens, San Francisco, California, United States.
- 1997 "My Life as a Comic Stripper." Galeria de la Raza, San Francisco, California, United States.

== Awards and honors ==
- 2006 Media Arts Awards for "The Re Awakening," San Jose CA USA
- 2003 Individual Arts Commission Grant of San Francisco, CA USA
- 1990 San Francisco Art Institute Grant, San Francisco, CA USA
- 1989 University of Kansas Minority Award of Excellence, KS USA
