= IABA =

IABA or Iaba may refer to:

== Boxing ==
- International Amateur Boxing Association
- Irish Athletic Boxing Association

== Professional associations ==
- International Association of Black Actuaries
- Iranian American Bar Association

== Other ==
- Iaba, one of the ancient Assyrian queens Iaba, Banitu and Atalia
- Israel Anti-Boycott Act, a proposed anti-BDS law in the United States
