= Todd Bernstein =

American activist

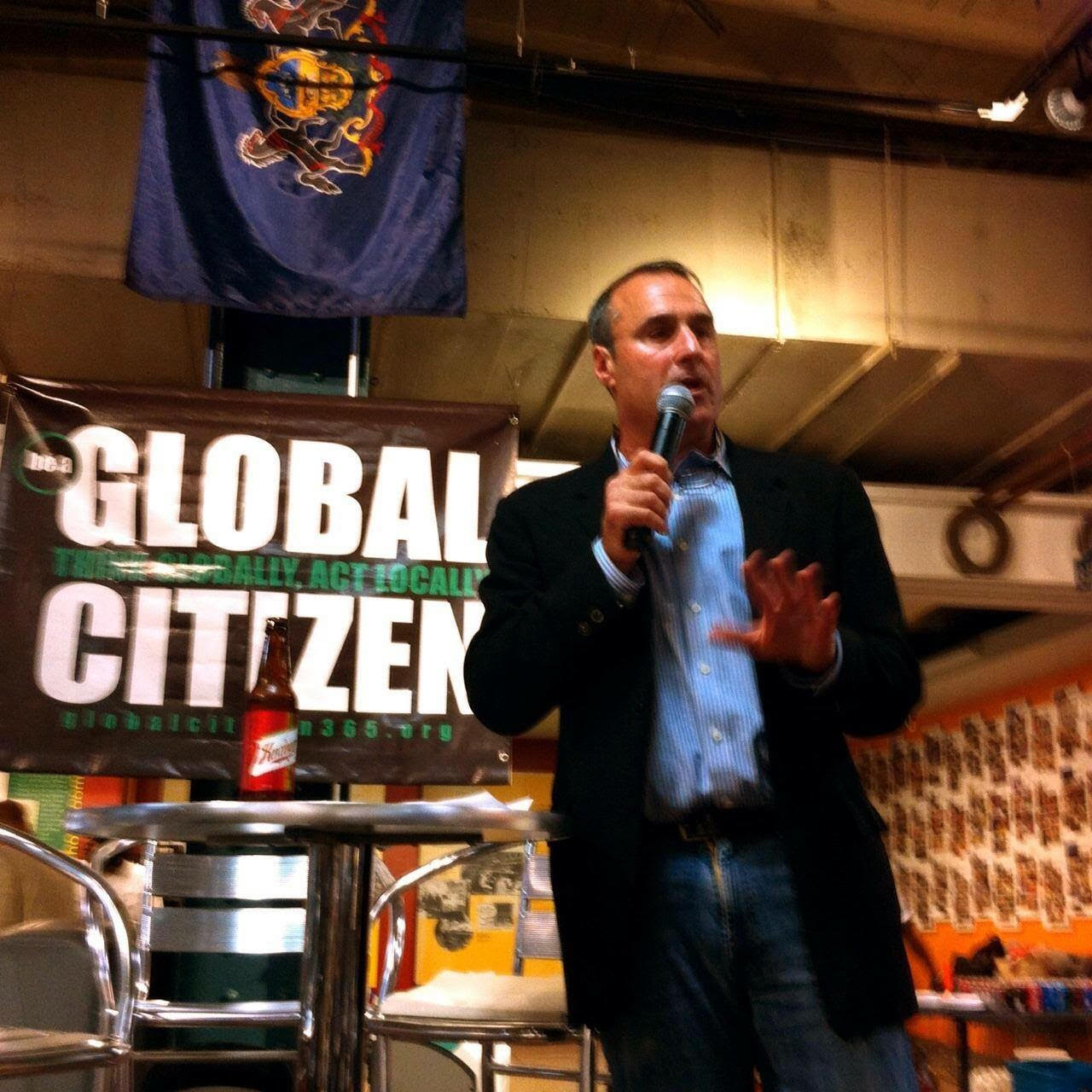
Todd Bernstein, the president and founder of Global Citizen

Todd Bernstein is an American civic engagement advocate. He is president of Global Citizen, a non-profit organization he founded in 1995, which promotes social justice through civic engagement. He created the Greater Philadelphia Martin Luther King Day of Service, an initiative dedicated to sustained citizen action through community service.

== Education ==
Bernstein holds a B.A. in Politics from Ithaca College and went on to graduate from the University of Pennsylvania's Fels Institute of Government.

== Career ==
=== King Day of Service ===
In 1994, Bernstein collaborated with Pennsylvania US Senator Harris Wofford and Atlanta Congressman John Lewis to launch the national King Day of Service, an initiative to encourage volunteer participation in honor of Martin Luther King Jr. In 1999, the Greater Philadelphia King Day of Service was recognized as a national Point of Light by the Points of Light Foundation.

Bernstein also founded MLK365, which aimed to extend the King Day of Service into a year-round civic engagement initiative in the Greater Philadelphia region.

=== Civic Engagement ===
In 1997, Bernstein served as national planner for the Presidents' Summit for America's Future, a five-day summit that brought U.S. presidents and community leaders together to address civic engagement and opportunities for young citizens. The summit led to the creation of America's Promise: The Alliance for Youth.

In 2000, he served as director of the National Shadow Convention, a bipartisan event held concurrently with the Republican and Democrat national conventions. From 2006 to 2008, Bernstein was director of the King Day of Service National Expansion Initiative.

== Honors ==
In 2012, Bernstein was named a ‘Champion of Change’ by the Obama administration as part of a civic engagement recognition program. He also received recognition such as the Points of Light Foundation’s National Award in 2000 and the Jewish Social Policy Action Network Social Justice Award in 2009. In 2013, he was honored by the national Bipartisan Policy Center in Washington, D.C. with its inaugural Public Service Award In 2012, the Philadelphia Association of Black Journalists recognized him with the Community Service Award. Bernstein was awarded the National Association of Blacks in Criminal Justice Legacy Award. In 2003, the Philadelphia Inquirer presented Bernstein with its Citizen Hero Award.
