= Quorum (disambiguation) =

A quorum is the minimum number of members of a deliberative body necessary to conduct the business of that group.

Quorum or The Quorum may also refer to:

- Minyan, in Judaism, a quorum required for certain religious obligations
- The Quorum (coffee house), New Orleans coffee house famous for being a seat of racial integration during the 60s
- Quorum (distributed computing), the minimum number of votes required to be allowed to perform an operation
- The Quorum (magazine), the first British homosexual magazine, shortlived in 1920
- Quorum (horse), sire of Red Rum
- Quorum (Latter Day Saints), a body of priesthood holders in the Latter Day Saint movement
- Quorum Business Park, an office development in North Tyneside, North East England, United Kingdom
- Quorum sensing, a system of stimulus and response correlated to population density
- Quorum, a London fashion boutique founded in the 1960s by Alice Pollock
- Quorum, a government agency in the DC Comics Universe
- Quorum (quartet), winner of the 2022 Barbershop Harmony Society International Quartet Championship

== See also ==
- The Quorum of the Twelve, a governing body in some Latter Day Saints churches
- QUOROM flow chart, a flow chart of studies in a systematic review
