= Shon Gables =

== Broadcasting career ==
Gables worked as a news anchor at WCBS-TV in New York City. As co-anchor of CBS 2 News This Morning from 2003 to 2006, Gables covered many New York City events, including the New York City Subway Centennial Celebration; the Republican National Convention; the Summer Olympics bid; the re-opening of the Statue of Liberty; the Twin Towers Memorial; the NYC Transit strike; and the Blackout of 2003.

Gables has hosted several specials such as "Salute to NYC Schools: Truman High School" and the "Tunnel to Towers Run". Gables also participated in the run, which honored the NYC firefighters who died on September 11, 2001. Gables also wrote and anchored "Salute to Harlem", which explored Harlem's economic development, social impact and future.

Gables launched her broadcast journalism career at KWCH-DT in Wichita, KS, where she reported and anchored the station's public affairs program. She then moved on to KWTV-DT in Oklahoma City, OK, promoted from associate producer to education reporter and news anchor, covering US military issues affecting Tinker Air Force Base. Next, Gables became morning news anchor/general assignment reporter for WDIV-TV in Detroit, MI. There, she covered breaking stories with all three US Automakers and served as spokesperson for the American Cancer Society's Southwest Michigan Division, which led her to produce a two-hour special on breast cancer awareness for WDIV. Gables also spent time in radio broadcasting, serving KVSP in Oklahoma City as news director and host. From 2007 to 2010, Gables was the host of Black Enterprise Business Report. She was then the weekend morning anchor for WFAA-TV in Dallas, TX until 2014 and an anchor with KTBS-TV in Shreveport, LA between 2016 and 2018

== Projects ==
Her next project, The Mocha Manual to a Fabulous Pregnancy DVD, debuted Mother's Day 2008. It is based on the top selling book written by Kimberly Allers, published by Amistad/HarperCollins.
