= Hutchins Center for African and African American Research =

Research institute in Massachusetts, US

The Hutchins Center for African and African American Research, also known as the Hutchins Center, is affiliated with Harvard University. The Center supports scholarly research on the history and culture of people of African descent around the world, facilitates collaboration and aims to increase public awareness of the subject. It was established as the W. E. B. Du Bois Research Institute in May 1975, making it the oldest research center focused on the study of the history, culture, and society of Africans and African Americans, with the rebranding as the Hutchins Center occurring in 2013.

== Affiliated institutes ==
The Hutchins Center includes or supports a number of research institutes and projects, including the Hiphop Archive and Research Institute, the Afro-Latin American Research Institute, the Image of the Black Archive & Library, the Project on Race & Gender in Science & Medicine, the History Design Studio and the Jazz Research Initiative. It is also home to the Ethelbert Cooper Gallery of African & African American Art, also known as the Cooper Gallery.

== History ==
The Center was established as the W. E. B. Du Bois Research Institute in May 1975, making it the oldest research center focused on the study of the history, culture, and society of Africans and African Americans. It was named after the first African American to be awarded a Ph.D. from Harvard in 1895, William Edward Burghardt Du Bois. It was established to create fellowships that would "facilitate the writing of doctoral dissertations in areas related to Afro-American Studies".

The Hutchins Center was launched in September 2013, named in honor of a $15 million gift from the Hutchins Family Foundation endowed by Glenn Hutchins. It continued to incorporate the W. E. B. Du Bois Research Institute.

== Description ==
The Hutchins Center supports scholarly research on the history and culture of people of African descent around the world, facilitates collaboration and aims to increase public awareness of the subject.

As of December 2020 Henry Louis Gates Jr. is the director of the Center.

== Publications and projects ==
The Center publishes Transition Magazine, and is connected to the Du Bois Review (edited by W.E.B. Du Bois Professor of the Social Sciences at Harvard Lawrence D. Bobo).

The African American National Biography Project is a joint project of the Hutchins Center and Oxford University Press.

The Center supported the establishment of the Centre for the Study of the Legacies of British Slave-ownership at University College London. The Centre's online database, the Legacies of British Slave-ownership, is free for public use.

== W. E. B. Du Bois Medal ==
In 2000, the Hutchins Center began awarding the W. E. B. Du Bois Medal, which is considered Harvard's highest honor in the field of African and African American studies.
