= Indian Rocks Dining Hall =

- U.S. National Register of Historic Places
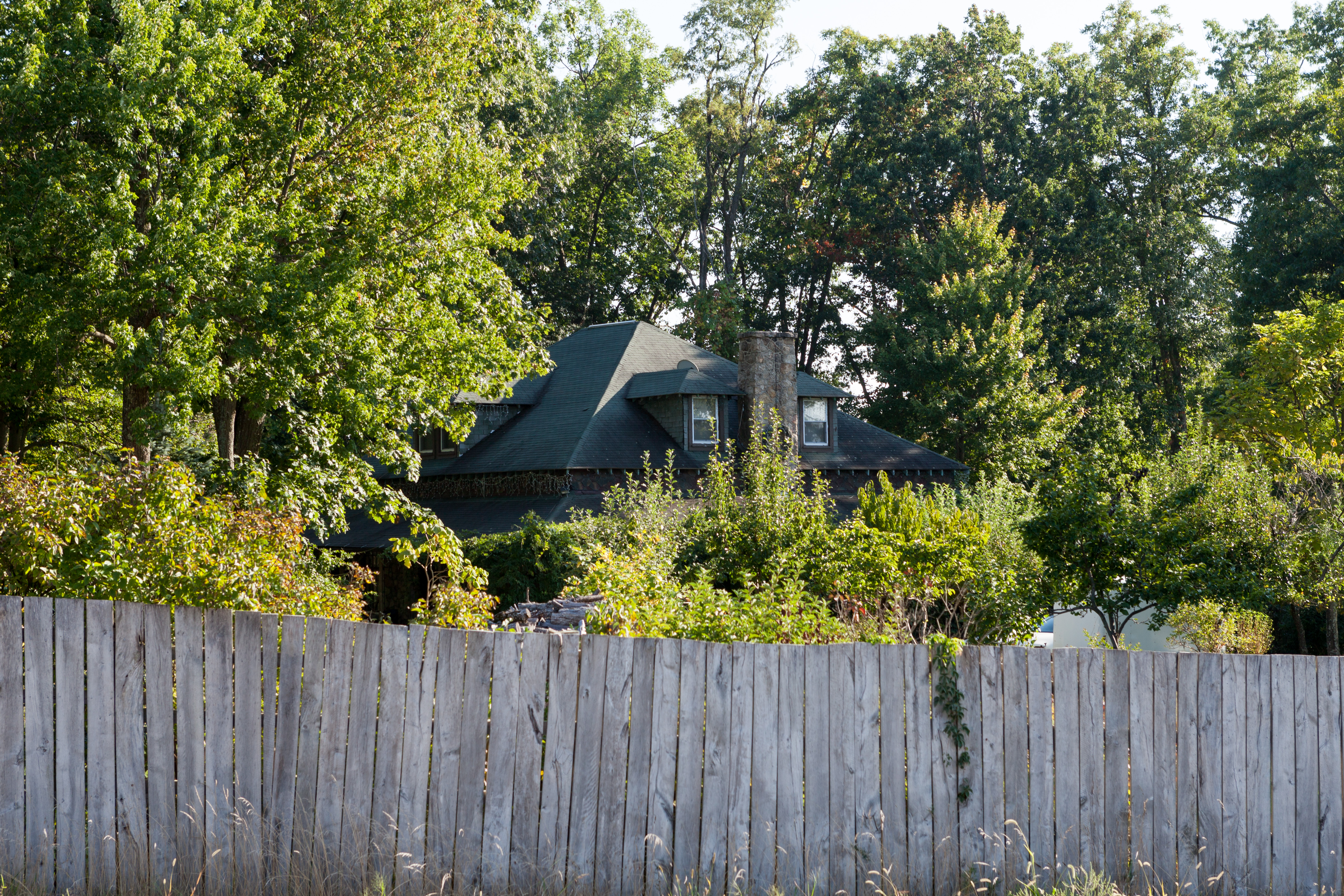
- The upper story and roof, seen from WV 7 in September, 2015

- Location within West Virginia Location within the United States
- Location: WV 7, 1 mile east of Reedsville, near Reedsville, West Virginia
- Coordinates: 39°30′37″N 79°45′55″W
- Area: 12 acres (4.9 ha)
- Built: 1928
- Architectural style: Adirondack
- NRHP reference No.: 02001688
- Added to NRHP: January 8, 2003

Indian Rocks Dining Hall is a historic building located near Reedsville, Preston County, West Virginia. The dining hall was built in 1928, and 1 1/2 stories, with a hip porch on three sides. The front facade is of brown fieldstone with a large fireplace at the center front of the building. It is in the rustic Adirondack style. Also on the property are a contributing tourist cabin (c. 1928), an ice / spring house (1928), and an ice pond (c. 1928). The property was developed in the late-1920s by John Henry Hunt, Sr., who was a pioneer in African American entrepreneurship and worked for the advancement of African Americans in West Virginia.

It was listed on the National Register of Historic Places in 2003.
