= National Association for Black Veterans =

US Veterans Service Organization

The National Association for Black Veterans (NABVETS) is a nationally certified Veterans Service Organization and a United States Department of Veterans Affairs claims representative. NABVETS has membership and chapters throughout the United States and Puerto Rico, providing personal advocacy on behalf of veterans seeking claims against the United States Department of Veterans Affairs. NABVETS' mission includes advocacy for youth and families, community involvement to help create positive lifestyles for veterans, and the empowerment of low-income and minority veterans. NABVET also works to generate and preserve historical records.
