= Golden State Mutual Life Insurance Building =

The name Golden State Mutual Life Insurance Building has been assigned to two different buildings in Los Angeles, California.

- Golden State Mutual Life Insurance Building (1928)
- Golden State Mutual Life Insurance Building (1949)
