= Political views of Paul Robeson =

Entertainer and activist Paul Robeson's political philosophies and outspoken views about domestic and international Communist countries and movements were the subject of great concern to the western mass media and the United States Government, during the Cold War. His views also caused controversy within the ranks of black organizations and the entertainment industry.

Robeson was never officially identified as a member of the Communist Party USA (CPUSA), domestically or internationally. Robeson's beliefs in socialism, his ties to the CPUSA and leftist trade unions, and his experiences in the USSR continue to cause controversy among historians and scholars as well as fans and journalists.

== First visit to the Soviet Union (1934) ==
Robeson journeyed to the Soviet Union in December 1934, via Germany, having been given an official invitation. While there, Robeson was welcomed by playwrights, artists and filmmakers, among them Sergei Eisenstein who became a close friend. Robeson also met with African Americans who had migrated to the USSR including his two brothers-in-law. Robeson was accompanied by his wife, Eslanda Goode Robeson and his biographer and friend, Marie Seton. He and his wife Eslanda were nearly attacked by Nazi Sturmabteilung at the stopover in Berlin.

=== Soviet constitution and anti-racist climate ===
Robeson recounted how Russian children and strangers approached him in the streets and offered to shake his hand. Robeson quickly became captivated with the Soviet experiment and its leadership, also declaring that African-American spiritual music resonated to Russian folk traditions. He told the press:

Here, I am not a Negro but a human being for the first time in my life ... I walk in full human dignity.

Robeson also took great interest in Article 123 of the Soviet Constitution which unlike the laws of the US at the time, effectively barred racial discrimination.

During this time Robeson also commented about the recent execution after court-martial trial of people described by The Daily Worker as "counter-revolutionary terrorists":

From what I have already seen of the workings of the Soviet government, I can only say that anybody who lifts his hand against it ought to be shot!

== 1930s–1940s ==
Through his writings and speeches during the mid-to-late 1930s, Robeson would go on to champion the cultural and political revolutions of the Soviet Union especially, as Robeson put it, "its national minority policy as it operates among the peoples of Central Asia." Robeson also advocated the similarities he found between blacks all over the world and the Russian people, urging African Americans to look towards the Soviet Union for inspiration in gaining full citizenship within the United States. Robeson also hoped that African countries would follow the example of the USSR and embrace socialism. Robeson studied Russian language and Russian history intensely during the inter-war period.

Paul Robeson's laudatory remarks for the socialist revolutions and decolonization of Africa and Asia were not considered controversial during this pre-Cold War era partially because Robeson himself publicly stated that his interest in the Soviet Union was "non-political" and because the USSR was not yet considered an enemy of the US. Robeson would eventually have his son educated in Moscow, widely announcing to the press that he did not want his son to face the "same discrimination that he had faced growing up in the United States."

When Robeson was given the news of Stalin's 1939 non aggression pact with Hitler, also known as the Molotov–Ribbentrop Pact, he saw the agreement as having been forced on the Soviets by the unwillingness of the military forces of Great Britain and France "to collaborate with the Soviet Union in a real policy of collective security". He personally wrote in his journal that an Anglo-Russian pact "would have stopped Nazi aggression" and thus leaving the USSR with no alternative choices in shoring up its borders.

In 1946, Robeson was questioned by the Fact-Finding Committee on Un-American Activities in California, informally known as the Tenney Committee. When he was asked whether he was a member of the Communist Party, Robeson replied that he might as well have been asked whether he was a registered Democrat or Republican—in the United States the Communist Party was equally legal. But, he added, he was not a Communist. There is no clear evidence that Robeson ever was a member of the Communist Party. According to records released under the Freedom of Information Act, the FBI believed that Robeson might have joined the Party under the name "John Thomas" but "his Communist Party membership book number is not known". Robeson's biographer, Martin Duberman, concludes that "he was never a member of CPUSA, never a functionary, never a participant in its daily bureaucratic operations". Paul Robeson, Jr. has also stated on numerous times that his father was never a member of the CPUSA.

Robeson opposed anti-communist legislation. In 1948, he opposed a bill calling for registration of Communist Party members and appeared before the Senate Judiciary Committee. Questioned about his affiliation with the Communist Party, he refused to answer, stating "Some of the most brilliant and distinguished Americans are about to go to jail for the failure to answer that question, and I am going to join them, if necessary." (The bill was ultimately defeated in the Senate.) In 1949, he spoke in favor of the liberty of twelve Communists (including his long-time friend Benjamin Davis, Jr.) convicted under the Smith Act, which criminalized various left- and right-wing activities as seditious.

Robeson endorsed Henry A. Wallace of the Progressive Party in the 1948 United States presidential election. He served as co-chair of the Henry Wallace for President Committee and toured the country making speeches in favor of his campaign.

== Itzik Feffer meeting and concert in Tchaikovsky Hall (June 1949) ==
In June 1949, during the 150th anniversary celebration of the birth of Alexander Pushkin, Robeson visited the Soviet Union on a major tour including a concert at Tchaikovsky Hall. Concerned about the welfare of Jewish artists, Robeson insisted to Soviet officials that he meet with Itzik Feffer a few days earlier. Robeson had first met Feffer on July 8, 1943, at the largest pro-Soviet rally ever held in the United States, an event organized by the Jewish Anti-Fascist Committee and chaired by Albert Einstein. Robeson then also got to know Solomon Mikhoels, the popular actor and director of the Moscow State Jewish Theater. Mikhoels also headed the Jewish Anti-Fascist Committee in the Soviet Union with Feffer as his second. After the rally, Robeson and his wife Essie had entertained Feffer and Mikhoels.

According to an account by Paul Robeson Jr told to Robeson biographer Martin Duberman, in the 1980s, Robeson was disturbed as to why he could not find his many Jewish friends when he returned to the U.S.S.R. in June 1949. After several inquiries, Feffer was brought to Robeson's hotel room by the State Police. He and Feffer were forced to communicate through hand gestures and notes because the room was bugged. Feffer indicated that Mikhoels had been murdered in 1948 by the secret police and intimated that he also was going to be killed. Feffer in fact was executed along with 14 other Jewish intellectuals three years later. After the talk with Feffer, Robeson would ask his friend Pete Blackman to "stick around" him during their stay in Moscow, and he would also caution Blackman to "watch what he said" around party officials.

=== Accounts of the meeting ===
There were no eyewitnesses who went on record, so the meeting of Paul Robeson and Itzik Feffer in Moscow has been given several varying interpretations. In recent years, Paul Robeson, Jr. has been quoted as saying that his father "tried to contact Soviet officials to see if anything could be done to release Feffer and other Jewish intellectuals." This conflicts somewhat with his first account to Martin Duberman, which stated that his father did not act to speak out on Feffer's behalf to Soviet officials. Solomon Mikhoels' daughter published an account that is nearly identical to that of Paul Robeson Jr., with Robeson specifically requesting to see Feffer except that places the meeting in 1951 which would not have been possible, given that Robeson was without his passport. A second and more angry account by composer Dimitri Shostakovich denounces Robeson for "staying silent", claiming the meeting was in a restaurant with Feffer accompanied by police agents. In The Long Journey by Slavic anthropologist Esther Markish, the author writes that Feffer, following orders from the Soviet secret police, carefully said nothing to Robeson about the purges.

=== Robeson's speaks publicly of Feffer ===
Robeson spoke during his concert in Tchaikovsky Hall on June 14, about his close friendship with Feffer and the recently deceased actor Solomon Mikhoels prior to singing the Vilna Partisan song "Zog Nit Keynmol" in both Russian and Yiddish. The concert was being broadcast across the entire Soviet Union. Historian and Robeson biographer Martin Duberman writes:

Asking the audience for silence he announced that there would be only one encore for that evening. He then spoke of his deep cultural ties between the Jewish peoples of the Soviet Union and the United States, and of how that tradition was being continued by the present generation of Russian-Jewish writers and actors. He then referred to his own friendship with Mikhoels and Feffer, and spoke of his great joy in having just come from meeting with Fefffer again. Robeson then sang in Yiddish, to a hushed hall, "Zog Nit Keynmol," the Warsaw Ghetto resistance song, first reciting the words in Russian:

Never say that you have reached the very end
When leaden skies a bitter future may portend;
For sure the hour for which we yearn will yet arrive
And our marching steps will thunder: 'we survive'.

After a moment's silence, the stunned audience, Great Russians and Jews alike responded with a burst of emotion, people with tears in their eyes coming up to the stage, calling out "Pavel Vaslyevich," reaching out to touch him. Having made that public gesture in behalf of Feffer and other victims of Stalin's policies-all that could have been done without directly threatening Feffers's life-Robeson clammed up on returning to the United States."

Robeson's spontaneous translation of the Yiddish text of the song of the Warsaw Ghetto Uprising into Russian and his personal tribute to Mikhoels and Feffer were censored from the tapes of the 1949 broadcast.

== Silence on Stalin ==
Upon returning to the United States, he denied any persecution of Jews or other political prisoners, stating: "I met Jewish people all over the place... I heard no word about it."

According to Joshua Rubenstein's book, Stalin's Secret Pogrom, Robeson also justified his silence on the grounds that any public criticism of the USSR would reinforce the authority of anti-Soviet elements in the United States which, he believed, wanted a preemptive war against the Soviet Union. A large number of Robeson biographers, including Martin Duberman, Philip S Foner, Marie Seton, Paul Robeson Jr., and Lloyd Brown, also concur with Robeson's own words, that he felt that criticism of the Soviet Union by someone of his immense international popularity would only serve to shore up reactionary elements in the U.S., the same elements that had lifted his passport, blocked anti-lynching legislation, and, according to Robeson, maintained a racial climate in the United States that also allowed Jim Crow, impoverished living conditions for all races and a white supremacist domination of the US government to continue. Robeson is on record many times as stating that he felt the existence of a major socialist power like the USSR was a bulwark against Western European capitalist domination of Africa, Asia and the Caribbean.

== Jackie Robinson's testimony to HUAC (April 1949) ==
At the World Congress of Partisans for Peace held in Paris on April 20, 1949, Robeson made the widely publicized controversial comments that American blacks would not support the United States in a potential post-World War II war with the Soviet Union. The subsequent controversy caused the House Committee on Un-American Activities (HUAC) to investigate Robeson. HUAC sought the testimony of the African American baseball star Jackie Robinson on the subject. In July 1949, Robinson eventually agreed to testify before HUAC, fearing that declining to do so might negatively and permanently damage his career. His testimony was a major media event, with Robinson's carefully worded statement appearing on the front page of The New York Times the following day.

== Views on Stalin ==
Robeson would state continually in speeches and essays that having experienced firsthand for himself during the 1930s a climate in Russia that he perceived as free from racial prejudice, he saw no western country or superpower actively attempt any comparable commitment. Robeson thus refused any pressure to publicly censure the Soviet experiment. He also stated that, the existence of the USSR was the guarantee of political balance in the world. During a 1949 address to the National Council of American-Soviet Friendship, he said:

Yes, all Africa remembers that it was Litvinov who stood alone beside Haile Selassie in Geneva, when Mussolini's sons flew with the blessings of the Pope to drop bombs on Ethiopian women and children. Africa remembers that it was the Soviet Union which fought the attempts of the Smuts to annex Southwest Africa to the slave reservation of the Union of South Africa... if the peoples of the Congo refuse to mine the uranium for the atom bombs made in Jim Crow factories in the United States; if all these peoples demand an end to floggings, an end to the farce of 'trusteeship' in the former Italian colonies.... The Soviet Union is the friend of the African and the West Indian peoples."

=== Stalin Peace Prize and Stalin eulogy (1952–1953) ===
In 1952, Robeson was awarded the Stalin Peace Prize. In April 1953, shortly after Joseph Stalin's death he wrote a eulogy entitled To You Beloved Comrade, in the New World Review, in which he praised Stalin's "deep humanity," "wise understanding," and dedication to peaceful co-existence with all peoples of the world calling him "wise and good." He also praised Stalin as a man that the world was fortunate to have for daily guidance: "Through his [Stalin's] deep humanity, by his wise understanding, he leaves us a rich and monumental heritage."

Robeson's comments of praise were made prior to Nikita Khrushchev's 1956 "Secret Speech" at the 20th Congress of the Communist Party of the Soviet Union regarding Stalin's purges. Though Robeson would continue to praise the USSR throughout his life, he would neither publicly denounce nor praise Stalin personally following Khrushchev's 1956 revelations. Many historians, Robeson scholars and advocates feel that his statements about Stalin and the Peace Prize itself are routinely used out of historical context to defame or disparage his legacy by his critics. In turn, many critics and historians feel the eulogy and prize are solid proof of his being a "hard line Stalinist."

== Robeson and House Un-American Activities Committee (1956) ==
Robeson's very vocal support of Communist countries and his outspoken political views, became a concern of the US government. Eventually he would have his passport lifted and spend eight years trying to win it back while being unwilling to sign an oath stating he was not a Communist. Robeson viewed signing such a statement and the existence of HUAC as a gross violation of every American's civil liberties.

In 1956, Robeson was called before the House Un-American Activities Committee (HUAC) after he refused to sign an affidavit affirming that he was not a Communist. In response to questions concerning his alleged Communist Party membership, Robeson reminded the Committee that the Communist Party was a legal party and invited its members to join him in the voting booth before he invoked the Fifth Amendment and refused to respond. Robeson lambasted Committee members on civil rights issues concerning African Americans. When one senator asked him why he hadn't remained in the Soviet Union, he replied: "Because my father was a slave, and my people died to build this country, and I am going to stay here, and have a part of it just like you. And no fascist-minded people will drive me from it. Is that clear? I am for peace with the Soviet Union, and I am for peace with China, and I am not for peace or friendship with the Fascist Franco, and I am not for peace with Fascist Nazi Germans. I am for peace with decent people."

Shortly thereafter he stated: "I am here because I am opposing the neo-fascist cause, which I see arising in these committees." (Audio recording of Paul Robeson's testimony before the House Un-American Activities Committee, June 12, 1956) At one point he remarked, "you are the nonpatriots, and you are the un-Americans, and you ought to be ashamed of yourselves". In making these statements, he was the only major figure to testify before HUAC who directly attacked the committee and subsequently cited for contempt of congress. The charges were later dismissed.

Robeson was also cross-examined over his opinions on Stalin and if he was no longer supporting Stalin's regime or the Soviet Union. In his testimony to HUAC he stated that: "I have told you, mister, that I would not discuss anything with the people who have murdered sixty million of my people, and I will not discuss Stalin with you." He later remarked that "I will discuss Stalin when I may be among the Russian people some day, singing for them, I will discuss it there. It is their problem." Asked if he had praised Stalin during his previous trip to the Soviet Union, Robeson replied, "I do not know." When asked outright if he had changed his mind about Stalin, he implored:

Whatever has happened to Stalin, gentlemen, is a question for the Soviet Union, and I would not argue with a representative of the people who, in building America, wasted sixty to a hundred million lives of my people, black people drawn from Africa on the plantations. You are responsible, and your forebears, for sixty million to one hundred million black people dying in the slave ships and on the plantations, and don't ask me about anybody, please.

== Possible challenge to Soviet policies ==
Robert Robinson, an African American toolmaker who had lived in the USSR since 1930 and who had met Robeson in the 1940s, wrote in his autobiography Black on Red: My 44 Years Inside the Soviet Union, as well as stated in a 1980s interview with Martin Duberman, that he recalled rumors during the early 1960s that Robeson had an "unpleasant confrontation" with Khrushchev about antisemitism. Historian Duberman found inconsistencies with Robinson's dates but posits that it involves an issue of "crucial if clouded importance" that may shed light on Robeson's subsequent suicide attempt in Moscow, March 1961 as well as his panic attack while passing the Soviet Embassy in London, September 1961 prior to his lengthy hospitalization at the Priory for mental illness.

Robinson had long since decided that Robeson was oblivious to the harsh Soviet realities, as he had refused Robinson's multiple appeals for assistance at getting out of the U.S.S.R. Robinson still recorded his astonishment when during the ball bearing factory concert (Robinson gives the date as 1961, but photographic evidence given by Duberman points to 1960), Robeson included "a mournful song out of the Jewish tradition, that decried their persecution through the centuries." Singing in Yiddish, with such a "cry in his voice", such a seeming "pleas to end the beating, berating and killing of Jews", that he concluded that Robeson had made a decisive choice to protest Soviet antisemitism. Robinson also recalls conversing with Robeson's interpreter and learning that he had been singing the Jewish songs at other appearances including major concert venues.

Robinson maintained having heard a rumor from five different people, none of whom knew each other and all of whom were "officials within the party structure". Robeson purportedly asked Khrushchev if stories in the Western press about the purges of Jews and widespread institutionalized antisemitism were true. And Khrushchev had purportedly blown up at him, accusing Robeson of trying to meddle in party affairs. Robinson also claimed to "have never heard his records again broadcast regularly" on radio Moscow and "never read another word about him in the press." Robeson would never return to the Soviet Union after his aforementioned five month hospitalization.

== Later views of communism (1960s) ==
During the early days of his retirement and even after his death, rumors about his health and its connections to his supposed disillusionment with the USSR continued to persist. There were even false claims that he was living in "self-imposed exile in the Soviet Union" by The New York Times who called him "the disillusioned native son".

At no time during his retirement (or his life) is Paul Robeson on record of mentioning any unhappiness or regrets about his beliefs in socialism or the Soviet Union nor did he ever express any disappointment in its leaders including Vladimir Lenin and Joseph Stalin. Moreover, only a few sources out of hundreds interviewed and researched by two of his biographers Martin Duberman and Lloyd Brown agreed with the claims made in the mainstream media of Robeson's supposed embitterment over the USSR.

Anna Louise Strong, the radical travel journalist, remarked in 1965 that she had always felt that "Paul's trouble had a deep psychosomatic cause in the shock and trauma he suffered from the Sino-Soviet split [...] Paul had a very deep love and devotion to both the USSR and for China's revolution and [...] consequently the split must have been especially hard for him, since his devotions have always been through passionate allegiance rather than through theory".

== Sources ==
- Duberman, Martin B. (1989). Paul Robeson. Bodley Head. ISBN 978-0370305752.
- Stewart, Jeffrey C., ed. (April 1998). Paul Robeson: artist and citizen. Rutgers University Press. ISBN 978-0813525105.
