= Dancing for eels =

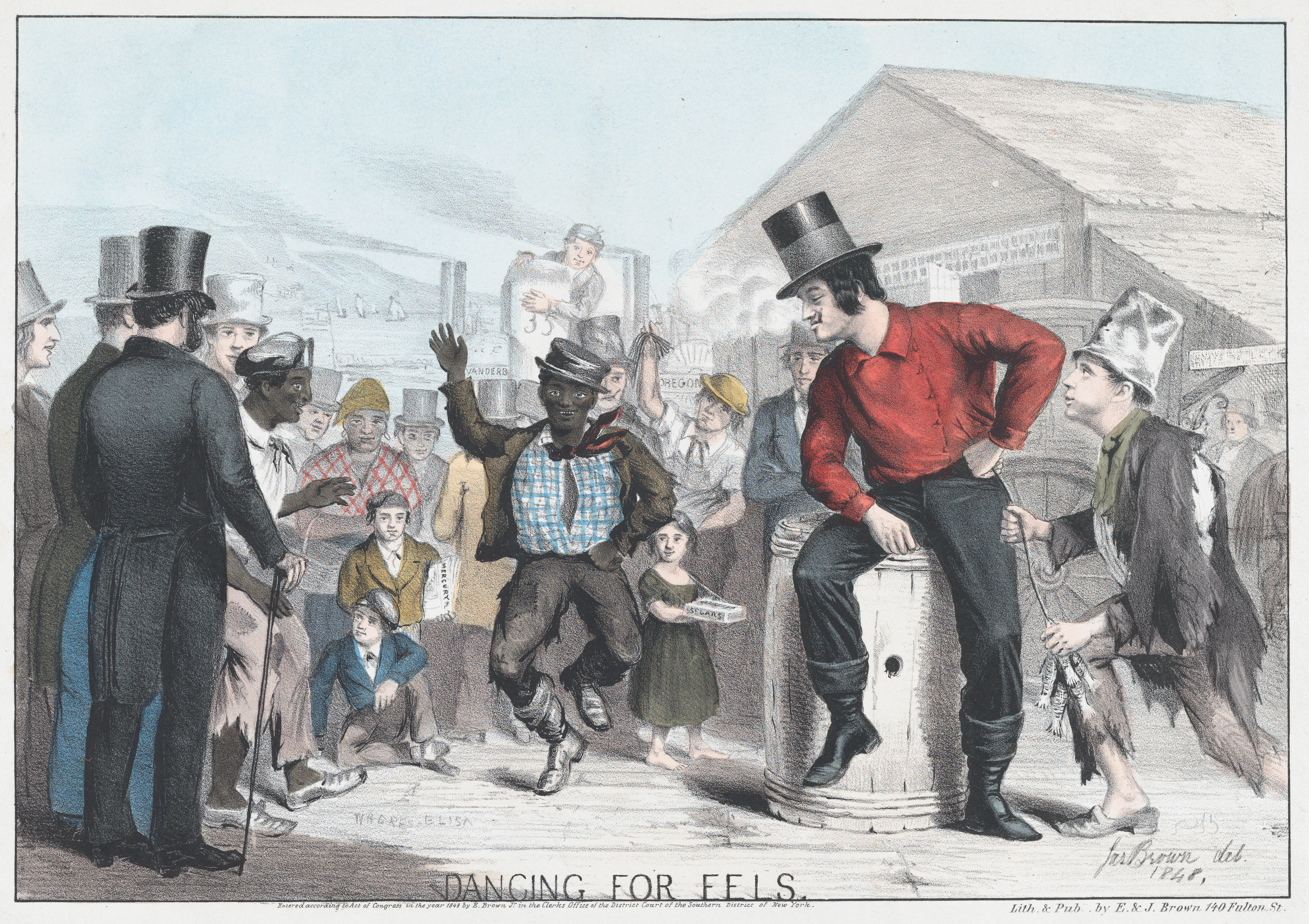
James Brown, Dancing for Eels, 1848, lithograph and watercolor, Metropolitan Museum of Art

Dancing for eels was a dance competition activity that was practiced during the 19th century by African-Americans at the market in Catherine Street and Catherine Slip (see Catherine Ferry) in New York City. The dancing steps and gestures used were characterized by relatively fixed choreography. This activity is depicted in a number of folk paintings, and is described in Thomas F. De Voe’s 1862 The Market Book. It is also analyzed in the 1998 book Raising Cain: Blackface performance from Jim Crow to Hip Hop by W.T. Lhamon, in connection with the development of blackface minstrelsy as well as African-American music and African-American dance performances.

According to Thomas de Voe's description, dancing for eels was a popular practice at Catherine Market, which in the 19th century was a destination place for African-American slaves from Long Island who would bring to the market berries, herbs, fish, clams and oysters in order to make a few shillings. Originally those African-Americans would be hired by the market people to dance for money or for fish (hence dancing for eels).

The Catherine Market in the 19th century was a mixed meeting place for people of various backgrounds, and white working-class people were frequent spectators of the dancing contests. According to W. T. Lhamon, blackface performance was strongly influenced by Catherine Market dancing elements. Modern rap and hip-hop performance also contain traces of gestural continuity from the New York street dancers, which, for example, can be observed in MC Hammer’s using the Market Step in his video U Can't Touch This: a knees open, heel-to-toe rock, often accompanied by one or both hands overhead. This move traces back to Dancing for Eels 1820 Catherine Market, one of the folk drawings depicting the old competition. This drawing is supposedly the source for a later painting, which dates to 1880-1890s. This painting is oil paint on canvas, laid over a tin backing. The subject and composition has a long popularity in American culture.

According to an 1849 fishing manual, black men still would meet at the market at dawn to skin eels and engage in dance competition for bundles of fish. The audience would vote for the winner through making noises and cheering for their most favorited performance. This style of competition carried on throughout African American culture all the way to modern-day freestyle rap competing. These forms of entertainment grew into routines that featured singing, dancing, and humor for more on stage acts performed by professions.

== See also ==
- "Dancing for Eels" oil painting ca. 1885, Antiques Roadshow, Washington DC, 21 August 2010 (Updated 2014)
