= Zoodio =

African-American street song and game

Song

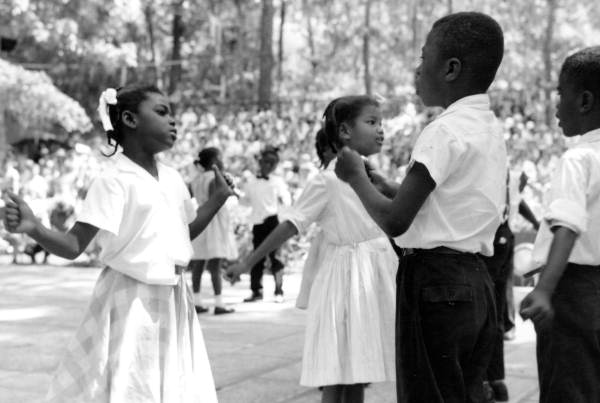
Children playing Zoodio.

"Zoodio", also spelled zoodeo, zudio, or zudie-o, is an African-American street song and game. Also a song sung by thousands of schools for its fun lyrics and diverse origins.

The lyrics are generally a variation of the following:

Here we go Zoodio, Zoodio, Zoodio
Here we go Zoodio,
All night long.

Step back, Sally, Sally, Sally
Step back, Sally
All night long.

To the front to the back to the s-s-side, to the s-s-side
To the front to the back to the s-s-side

I looked out my window and what did I see
I saw a big fat man from Tennessee
I bet you five dollars I can beat that man
I bet you five dollars I can beat that man

To the front to the back to the s-s-side, to the s-s-side
To the front to the back to the s-s-side

Walkin' through the alley, alley, alley
Walkin' through the alley
All night long.
