= ACAE =

American institution for the benefit of African students

The American Council on African Education (ACAE) is an American institution for the benefit of African students.

It was established in 1945 by Nigerian politician and prince Nwafor Orizu, who obtained numerous tuition scholarships from American sources for the benefit of African students.

Among its members are Alain LeRoy Locke, Oric Bates, Mary McLeod Bethune, Harry Emerson Fosdick and Constance Agatha Cummings. They were instrumental in offering scholarships to Nigerian students studying in the United States. Its membership consisted of both black and white academics, journalists and philanthropists.
