= The Kidflix Film Fest of Bed-Stuy =

The KIDflix Film Fest of Bed-Stuy!
- Location: Fulton Park in Stuyvesant Heights, Brooklyn, New York, United States
- Founded: 2000
- Hosted by: Museum of Contemporary African Diasporan Arts
- Festival date: Every Friday night in August

The Kidflix Film Fest of Bed-Stuy (styled The KIDflix Film Fest of Bed-Stuy!) is a free annual film festival for children and their families presented by the Museum of Contemporary African Diasporan Arts (MoCADA). With the exception of the 2020 season (which was suspended due to COVID-19), it has been held every Friday night in August since 2000.

The festival was founded by local artist TRUE, with the help of MoCADA’s former Executive Director (and current New York City Council woman), Laurie Cumbo. It has been produced in partnership with African Film Festival, Inc. since 2003, and has also collaborated with organizations such as Black Girls Rock!, caribBEING, DCTV, Red Clay Arts, Reel Sisters of the Diaspora Film Festival, Scenarios USA and others. It is funded, in part, by corporate sponsors, governmental agencies, and audience contributions.

The festival is an extension of MoCADA’s public outreach programs, and strives to present films that further the museum’s mission, to “…give a more accurate portrayal of contributions to the historical, artistic and cultural landscape of the world by people of African descent.” The organizers also try to showcase local and independent filmmakers, and films made by youth. Film selections have been curated around themes such as “Celebrating Black Music!” “Black Girls Rock!,” “Growing Up Muslim,” and “Young Black Lives Matter,” and are often preceded by live music and dance performances and workshops that are thematically linked to the night’s films.

Selections have included: Amandla!: A Revolution in Four-Part Harmony; The Autobiography of Miss Jane Pittman; The Boys of Baraka; Bronx Princess; Chisholm ’72: Unbought & Unbossed; Slingshot Hip Hop; The Trials of Muhammad Ali; and War/Dance. Each year, the festival ends with an interactive “Sing & Dance-Along” to The Wiz that features visual effects, a yellow brick road, puppets, a costume contest, and a tribute to the music of Michael Jackson and Lena Horne (who grew up in Bedford-Stuyvesant). Popcorn, face-painting, and “I’m a KIDflix KID!” T-shirts are provided free of charge to hundreds of kids each year.

In 2009, former Brooklyn Boro President Marty Markowitz commemorated KIDflix's 10th season by officially proclaiming August 7, 2009 as "The KIDflix Film Fest of Bed-Stuy! Day" in Brooklyn, New York.

In 2014, Brooklyn Boro President Eric Adams commemorated KIDflix's 15th season by officially proclaiming August 1, 2014 as “The KIDflix Film Fest of Bed-Stuy! Day” in Brooklyn, New York.
