= "Good Hair" and Other Dubious Distinctions =

- Directed by: Camille Debose
- Release date: August 22, 2011 (Black Harvest)
- Running time: 34 minutes
- Country: United States
- Language: English

"Good Hair" and Other Dubious Distinctions is a 2011 documentary film directed, written and edited by Camille S. DeBose. The film focuses on cultural language and practices that negatively impact the development of a healthy sense of self. The filmmaker's commentary asserts a criticism of the way wavy hair, lighter skin and a slender nose are still considered more attractive in the black community in light of historical and contemporary movements which have sought to liberate black self-esteem.

As a practicing and teaching sociologist, the filmmaker sought to illuminate the notion of symbolic violence through the lens of Pierre Bourdieu and spark conversation not just in the black community but all other communities as well. Cultural practices which value some features but not others are issues common to every family and every community. For the filmmaker this is an issue of valuing and finding beauty in every human being.

== Synopsis ==
The film begins with a series of outdoor shots narrated by the filmmaker. The viewer follows her fuzzy form as she approaches the camera and tells a story of people remarking on the features they hope her unborn child will be born with. The film continues with a collection of personal stories juxtaposed against discussion and analysis from professionals and academics. Viewers get glimpses of the filmmaker's pregnant form as she travels through the landscape. The film ends with the sight of the filmmaker's child and a quote by bell hooks on shame and the life cycle.

== Release ==
The film had its Chicago debut at the Black Harvest Film Festival on August 22, 2011.

== Recognition ==
- 2012 - This film was an official selection at the San Francisco Black Film Festival.
- 2012 - This film was an official selection at the Langston Hughes African American Film Festival in Seattle, WA.
- 2012 - This film was awarded Second Place for Best Documentary at the Central Illinois Feminist Film Festival.

== Reviews ==
The film was reviewed and recommended by Video Librarian in their 2013 January/February online issue.
