= Bread and Roses (disambiguation) =

Bread and Roses is a political slogan originally associated with the 1912 textile strike in Lawrence, Massachusetts.

Bread and Roses may also refer to:

- Bread and Roses (1967 film), a 1967 East German film
- Bread and Roses (1993 film), a 1993 biographical film about the New Zealand trade unionist Sonja Davies
- Bread and Roses (2000 film), a 2000 film about custodial workers in Los Angeles
- Bread and Roses (2023 film), a 2023 film about women in Afghanistan
- Bread and Roses (album), a 1976 album by Judy Collins
- Bread and Roses (collective), a women's liberation collective based in Boston, Massachusetts
- Bread and Roses (magazine), a magazine for British and Irish members of the Industrial Workers of the World
- Bread and Roses (political party), a United States political party based in the state of Maryland
- Bread and Roses Award, a British award for radical books
- Bread and Roses Heritage Festival, an annual labor history and social justice festival in Lawrence, Massachusetts
- Bread and Roses Presents, an entertainment nonprofit organization associated with Mimi Fariña and based in San Francisco
- Bread and Roses TV, weekly bilingual TV/YouTube show produced by the Council of Ex-Muslims of Britain
- Bread and Roses: Her Story, an autobiography of the New Zealand trade unionist Sonja Davies
