= Rebecca's Revival =

Rebecca's Revival: Creating Black Christianity in the Atlantic World is a biography written by Jon F. Sensbach, a professor of history at the University of Florida. It follows the life of Rebecca Protten a slave and then freed woman of mixed white and African descent, who, while living on the island of St. Thomas during the 1730s, became part of the movement to convert slaves to Christianity. Sensbach attempts to show how the rise of the 'Black Church' was in part a result of Rebecca's early evangelical efforts at slave conversion.

== Sources ==
- Sensbach, Jon F. (2005). Rebecca's Revival: Creating Black Christianity in the Atlantic World . Harvard University Press. ISBN 9780674022577. Retrieved June 25, 2020.
