= United States v. Montgomery County Board of Education =

United States v. Montgomery County Bd. of Ed.
- Supreme Court of the United States

Argued April 28, 1969 Decided June 2, 1969
- Full case name: United States v. Montgomery County Board of Education
- Citations: 395 U.S. 225 (more) 89 S. Ct. 1670; 23 L. Ed. 2d 263; 1969 U.S. LEXIS 1433

Holding
- The school board must move toward a goal whereby "in each school the ratio of white to Negro faculty members is substantially the same as it is throughout the system."

Court membership
- Chief Justice Earl Warren Associate Justices Hugo Black · William O. Douglas; John M. Harlan II · William J. Brennan Jr. Potter Stewart · Byron White; Thurgood Marshall

Case opinion
- Majority: Black, joined by unanimous

United States v. Montgomery Country Board of Education, 395 U.S. 225 (1969), was a case heard before the United States Supreme Court concerning the integration of public schools in Montgomery County, Alabama.

== See also ==
- List of United States Supreme Court cases, volume 395
