= D Underbelly =

D Underbelly performing Koool-Aid Luv Odyssey at the Transmodern Festival in Baltimore on March 31, 2007

D Underbelly (styled D UNDERBELLY) is an underground network of independent performance artists and dancers of color based in Brooklyn, New York, founded in 1997 by Artistic Director Baraka de Soleil. D Underbelly is invested in interdisciplinary exploration through the excavation of new work and communal exchange and reflects the traditions of the African diaspora immersed in a contemporary reality.

The company’s work is diverse, difficult to characterise, and has included plays, elements of modern dance and African dance, new media, performance art and installation art. D Underbelly has toured the United States and internationally.

Works include:

- N This Hous [sic], developed at the Tribeca Performing Arts Center Residency Program
- Water Moves the Soul, a project based on the physical, spiritual and emotional memories of ancestors who went through the Atlantic slave trade
- Koool-Aid Luv Odyssey, a hip trip psychedelic journey through the fixating liquid legacies of our society, premiering at BAX / Brooklyn Arts Exchange in February 2007

== Plays written ==
- First Dark Drama, written by Baraka de Soleil and Daniel Givens, which premiered at the Richard Foreman Ontological-Hysteric Theater in the East Village, Manhattan of New York City.

== Awards ==
- 2006 AUDELCO Viv Award-winner
- 2006 Jerome Hill Travel and Study grant to Ghana, West Africa, in order to study the experiences of slaves in the African slave trade and Atlantic slave trade routes. Two works will be created: The first is the kinesthetic based EGRESS, an abstraction of the Jean-Paul Sartre play No Exit, which explores the subconscious of contemporary culture and relationships, refracting an expansive notion of “blackness”. The second work, Childr’n of O, examines the voice and image of an iconic Black woman figure. The project uses seven characters, utilizing poetic text, the deconstruction of television and Internet cultural symbolism, and the use of gesture language and multimedia projections.
- McKnight Foundation Choreography Fellowship
- Nadine Blacklock Nature Sanctuary Fellowship
