= The Negro Star =

African American newspaper published from 1908 to 1953

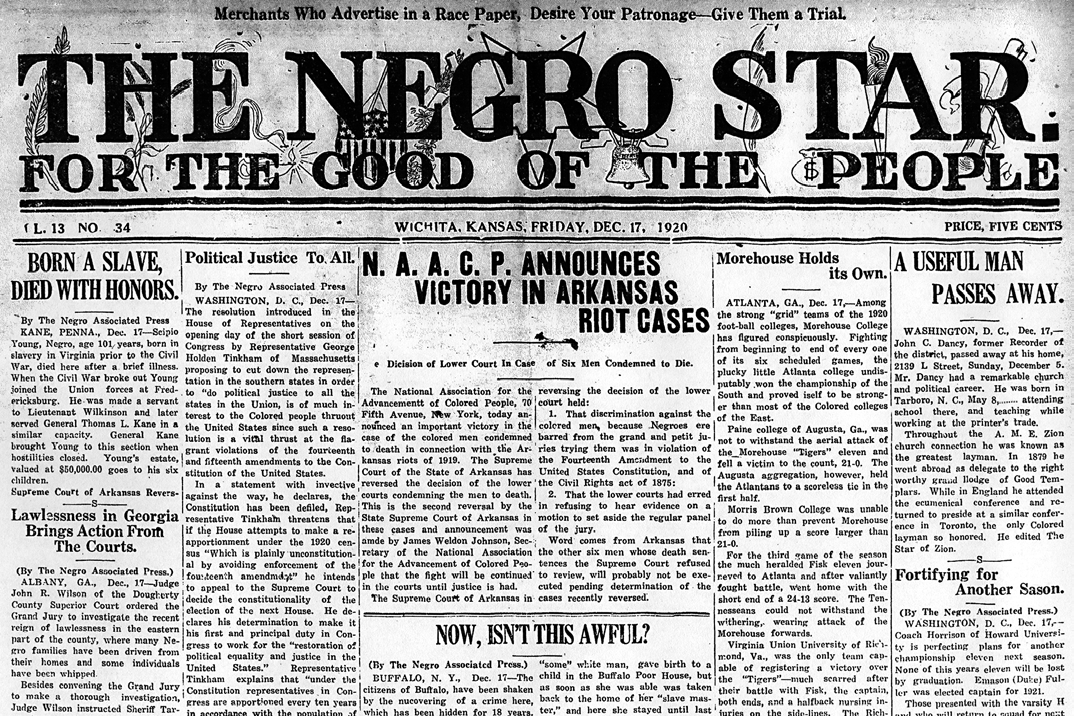
- Front page of The Negro Star on December 17, 1920, announcing the NAACP's declaration of victory in the "Arkansas riot cases"
- Type: Weekly newspaper
- Founder: Hollie T. Sims
- Publisher: H. T. and Virginia Sims
- Editor: H. T. Sims
- Founded: February 1908
- Ceased publication: January 16, 1953
- Headquarters: Wichita, Kansas
- OCLC number: 12617095

The Negro Star was an African American newspaper created by Hollie T. Sims that ran from 1908 to 1953. Sims founded the paper in Greenwood, Mississippi, but moved it to Wichita, Kansas, in 1919 as a result of racial hostility. Bringing national news to Wichita, the Star was one of few newspapers that provided African Americans news and access to African-American updates during the early to mid-1900s.

== History ==
Hollie Sims originally ran The Negro Star while he lived in Greenwood, Mississippi. However, the city sheriff and others made Sims unwelcome there after he wrote a tribute to the black soldiers of World War I. Sims and his wife therefore moved their family, along with two other families involved in the Star's production, to Wichita, Kansas in 1919.

Sims and his family were very involved with both the newspaper and the community (among other activities, Sims founded the Wichita chapter of the NAACP). At the time of the move, the Star's assistant editor was W. S. Moore. Sims' brother Hugh also worked at the Star, as did B. H. Neely, who partnered with Sims to form the Kansas Coal and Mercantile Company. For a period in 1934–35, the paper tapped Bennie Williams as a sports editor.

The Sims continued to publish the Star until 1953; Virginia Sims wrote in January, "Because of Editor Sims [sic] continued weak condition, we are giving up printing; [the Star] goes into new hands later this week". The paper continued as The Post Observer until July 1953 and the Wichita Post Observer until July 1954.

== Ownership and memberships ==
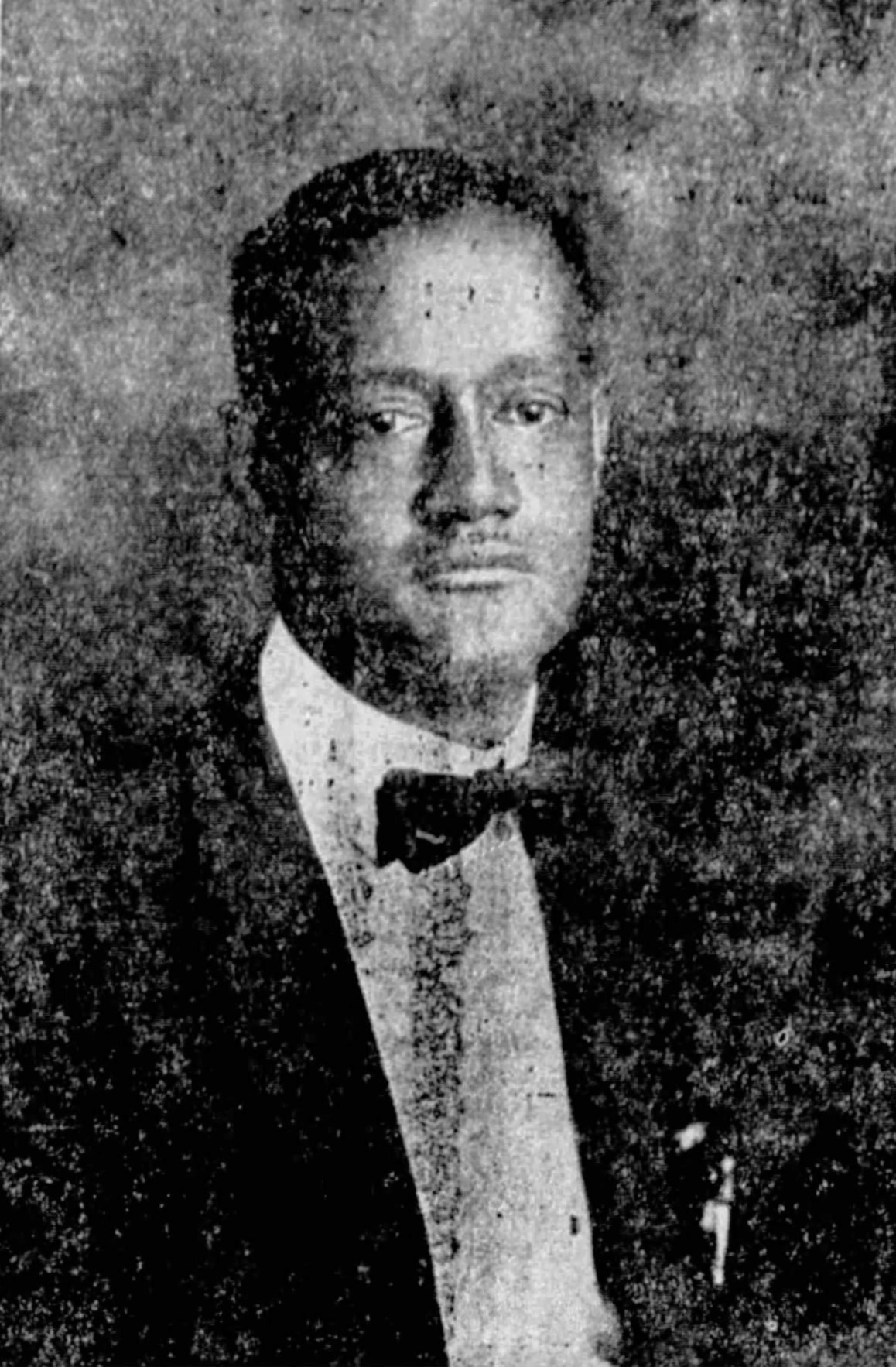
Hollie T Sims (1926)

The Star was a paper that came from Sims's vision to spread news of African American progress. Sims and his wife issued and distributed the Star from a barn behind their house until Sims died in 1953. However, the paper received nationwide recognition thanks to a membership campaign by the National Negro Business League, which had been founded by Booker T. Washington in 1900 with a mission "to promote the commercial and financial development of the Negro."

The Star became a member of the National Negro Press Association, a society of African-American editors and publishers associated with the National Business League, in 1908 (the organization was then called the National Colored Press Association). The Star eventually became a member of the National Newspaper Publishers Association when the National Negro Press Association was incorporated into that group in 1940.

The Star also belonged to Wichita's Baptist State Convention and Auxiliaries, a collection of Baptist churches, district associations, and auxiliaries.

== Coverage ==
The Star was circulated in the city of Wichita and its surrounding areas in Sedgwick County, Kansas.

== Content ==
The Star covered African-American issues across the nation in various topics. As a general-interest newspaper, the Star habitually published stories covering entertainment, public figures, business promotions and advertisements, societal activity, sporting events, and both local and national criminal activity. Because white newspapers paid little attention to African Americans except as "athletic stars, entertainers, or criminals", African Americans in Wichita could only read about daily news of interest to the black community in the Star and one other Wichitan paper, the People's Elevator. Sims wrote in 1922 that "a newspaperman's duty is to serve the public by giving the truth of all matters [...] regardless of his own individual opinions or creed."

Advertisements for local African-American businesses, shops, and services were written into the paper as a form of marketing in a segregated community. The Star encouraged African Americans to patronize existing businesses and services, try new ones, and generally support the local economy.

In August 1934, the Star hired a sports editor and began covering the state baseball tournament in a separate sports page; previously, sports coverage in the paper had been quite spotty. This sports page, consisting of both local articles and reports from the Associated Negro Press wire service, continued until January 1935.
