= Mytown (organization) =

Mytown, an acronym for Multicultural Youth Tour of What's Now, was a youth organization based in Boston, Massachusetts, USA, engaging young people in learning about and teaching others about the local history of their urban neighborhood.

== History and mission ==
Mytown was founded in 1995 by Karilyn Crockett and Denise Thomas, with a mission to "use the process of sharing local history to empower young people and build appreciation of urban neighborhoods. Mytown believes that young people and communities can realize the power local history has in increasing youth activism and decreasing the stereotypes that stigmatize urban neighborhoods."

Since the organization's founding, mytown has trained nearly 300 low and moderate-income Boston teenagers in learning the history of their neighborhood, community and city. Once trained, members lead historical walking tours of Boston's neighborhoods to almost 10,000 Boston residents and visitors annually.

== Founding idea ==
Founder Karilyn Crockett, as a young African American girl, felt disconnected from Boston, the city in which she was raised. She went on a walking tour of Roxbury and the South End, learning about the history of the Pullman Porters, Tent City Settlement, and about the many migrants and immigrants from around the world that had built and transformed Boston over 350 years. Crockett's tour was transformative; for the first time she felt that Boston was a place that she could call "my town."
