= St. Mary's Beneficial Society Hall (Upper Marlboro, Maryland) =

- U.S. National Register of Historic Places
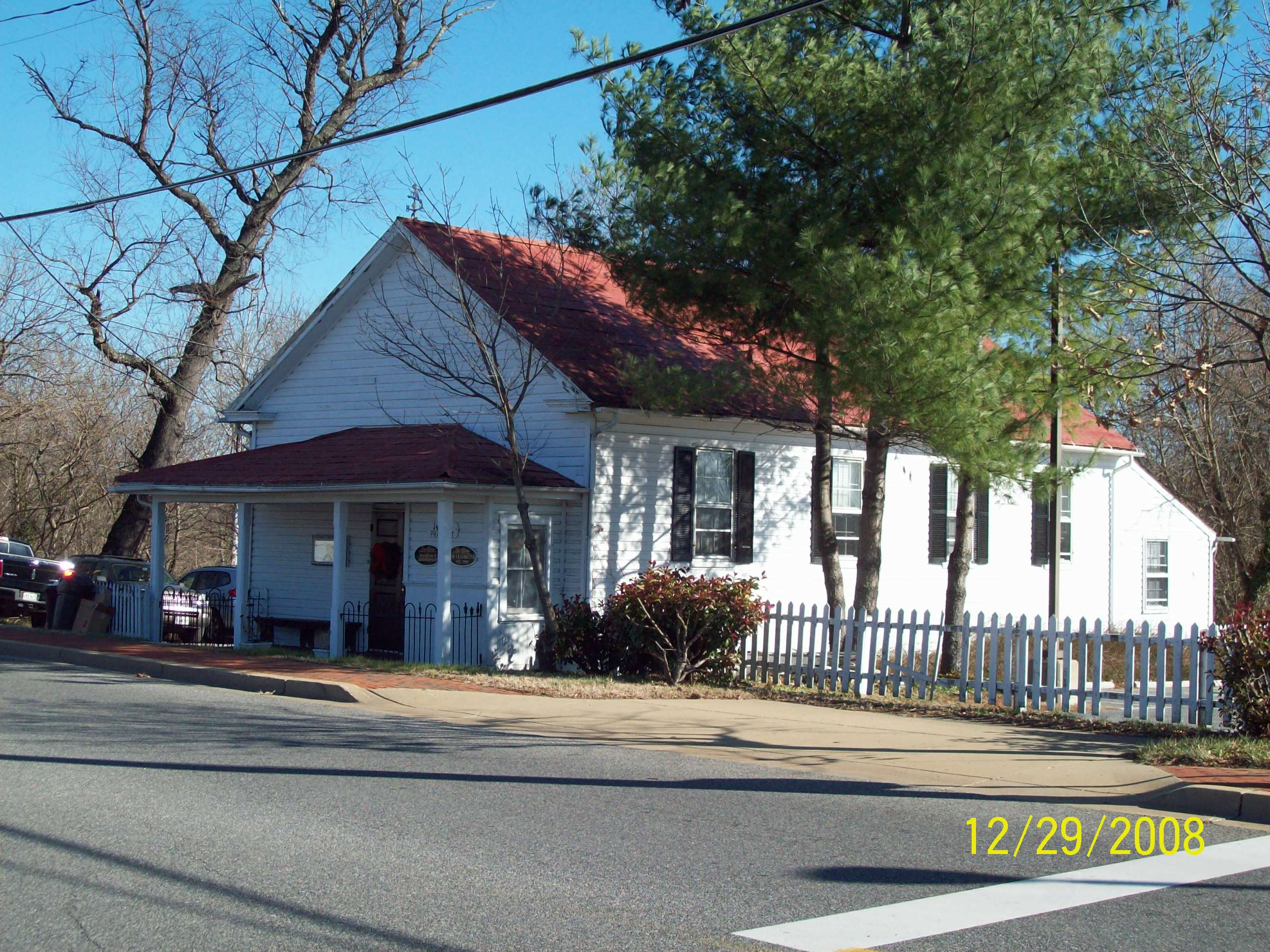
- St. Mary's Beneficial Society Hall, December 2008

- Location within Maryland Location within the United States
- Location: 14825 Pratt St., Upper Marlboro, Maryland
- Coordinates: 38°49′11″N 76°44′53″W
- Area: 0.3 acres (0.12 ha)
- Built: 1892
- MPS: African-American Historic Resources of Prince George's County, Maryland
- NRHP reference No.: 05000150
- Added to NRHP: March 14, 2005

St. Mary's Beneficial Society Hall, constructed in 1892, is a historic building located in Upper Marlboro, Prince George's County, Maryland.

The Hall, an excellent example of an African American multi-purpose building, served as a meeting place, social and political center, and house of worship for African Americans living in a segregated society. It is located nearly across the street from St. Mary's Catholic Church, with which it is historically associated.

It is a one-story wood frame gable-front building, In 1988, a law firm acquired the building and converted it to office space.

It was listed on the National Register of Historic Places in 2005.
