= Afro-American Museum of Pompano Beach =

The Afro-American Museum of Pompano Beach was a museum that was located at 295 NW Sixth St., Pompano Beach, Florida. It operated from 1983 to 1985, but closed because of lack of community support. It was founded and run by Karl Weaver.
