= Clothing in the ragtime era =

The ragtime era helped to define not only new music but also new clothing.

== Clothing style and class ==
The ragtime era began in the late 19th century and transitioned into the early 20th century (approximately 1897–1918), a period of class conflict in Western society. The difference between the upper and lower classes could clearly be seen. Much of this had to do with their clothing and how they carried themselves in public.

== Upper class ==
The upper class could afford to dress well. Women often appeared in long white gowns, which were in fashion at the time. On these dresses were white collars and usually a brooch that kept the collar closed. Women often wore large white hats and carried parasols as accessories. Some women wore wrist bracelets, but not much jewelry was worn. Bustles were commonplace for women as well. Men often wore light, form-fitting suits and wore bow ties as accessories. It was not rare to see men wearing handlebar mustaches.

== Lower class and immigrant population ==
Whereas the upper class was put together and proper, and everything was crisp, clean, and uniformed, the immigrant population was quite the opposite. This was the very beginning of immigrants being allowed to enter the United States via Ellis Island. Because they were able to carry very little over to the New World, they had little clothing and little money to buy more when their clothes started to wear out. They would, therefore, mismatch their clothing or reuse the fabric from an old article of clothing so that they could get multiple uses out of each garment.

== African American population ==
Many African Americans enjoyed popular music from the ragtime era. Their sense of style in clothing seemed to reflect this. Whereas the mostly Caucasian American upper class dressed in clean and light-colored fabric (often cream or white), the African Americans dressed in bright and vibrant clothing when they attended clubs that played ragtime music. The most popular dance frocks had peplums, with a somewhat high waistline. Whereas the upper-class clothing was form-fitting, their clothes were loose, which allowed for free and easy movement. Women often adorned their hair with colorful flowers as accessories, and men often wore vests and bowler hats as their accessories.
