= National Organization of Black Women in Law Enforcement =

United States non-profit organization

National Organization of Black Women in Law Enforcement, Inc.
- Abbreviation: NOBWLE
- Formation: 1985; 41 years ago
- Founder: Special Agent Gladys Jones
- Founded at: Washington, DC Metropolitan area
- Type: Non-profit organization
- Headquarters: Fort Washington, Maryland
- Services: Provides training conferences, education, and professional network for women in law enforcement
- Key people: Special Agent Gladys Jones

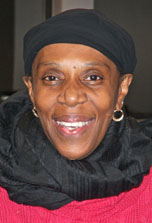
Gladys Jones, founder of NOWBLE

The National Organization of Black Women in Law Enforcement, Inc. (NOBWLE) is a United States non-profit organization devoted to furthering the hiring, training, retention, and promotion of females in law enforcement. The organization promotes a spirit of professionalism by preparing women through education and training to keep abreast of current theories and techniques. It is headquartered in Fort Washington, MD, and have chapters in Maryland, Pittsburgh, Philadelphia and Newark. The organization holds training conferences throughout the year.

NOBWLE was founded in 1985 by Special Agent Gladys Jones and several others from the Washington, DC Metropolitan area, to give women a network and a voice within their profession. NOBWLE seeks both women and men to help mentor women in the law enforcement community, to give back NOWBLE members' children, to help support families with needs, and to continue being strong role models in order to lift each other up.

== See also ==
- National Organization of Black Law Enforcement Executives
