= African American National Biography Project =

The African American National Biography Project is a joint project of the Hutchins Center for African & African American Research at Harvard University and Oxford University Press. The object of the project is to publish and maintain a database of African Americans similar in scope to the American National Biography.

The African American National Biography (AANB) was published in print in 2008, with a supplement of over 1500 entries published in 2013.

The database, which is continually updated, includes many entries by noted scholars, among them Sojourner Truth by Nell Irvin Painter; W. E. B. Du Bois by Thomas Holt; Rosa Parks by Darlene Clark Hine; Miles Davis by John Szwed; Muhammad Ali by Gerald Early; and President Barack Obama by Randall Kennedy. In 2008 the AANB was selected as a CHOICE Outstanding Academic Title, was named a Library Journal Best Reference work, and awarded Booklist Editors’ Choice — Top of the List.

The general editors of the project are Henry Louis Gates Jr. and Evelyn Brooks Higginbotham, while the executive editor is Steven J. Niven of the W.E.B. Du Bois Institute.
