= McComas Institute =

- U.S. National Register of Historic Places
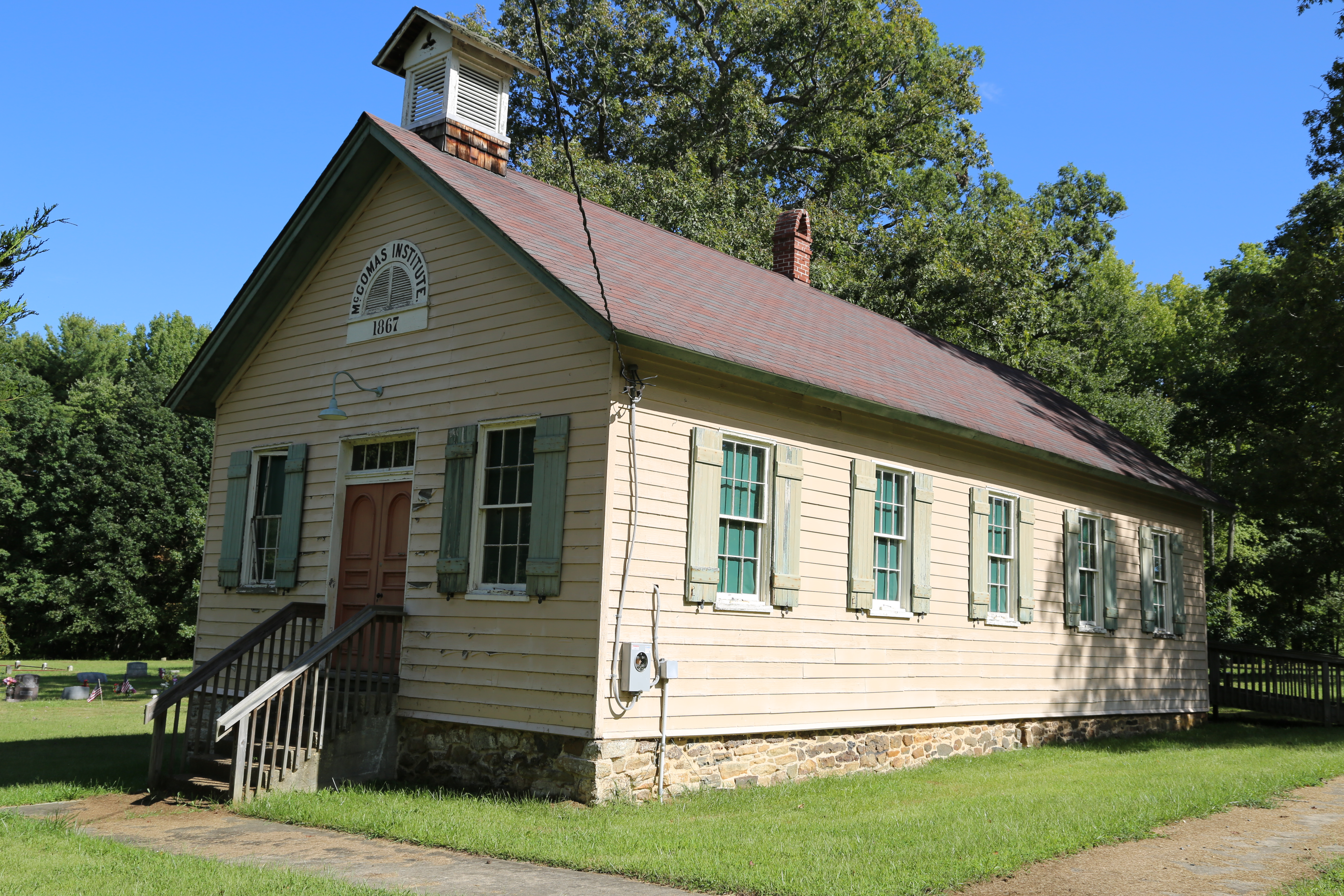
- McComas Institute 2014

- Location within Maryland Location within the United States
- Nearest city: Joppa, Maryland
- Coordinates: 39°28′2″N 76°21′30″W
- Area: 1 acre (0.40 ha)
- Built: 1867
- NRHP reference No.: 80001819
- Added to NRHP: September 8, 1980

McComas Institute is a historic school located at Joppa, Harford County, Maryland, United States. The school was built in 1867, and is a one-story frame structure with a gable roof, five bays long and three bays wide, and resting on a stone foundation. It is one of three schools erected in the area by the Freedmen's Bureau after the Civil War.

The McComas Institute was listed on the National Register of Historic Places in 1980.
