= Snow Hill Site =

- U.S. National Register of Historic Places
- Nearest city: Port Deposit, Maryland
- Area: 1 acre (0.40 ha)
- Built: 1847
- NRHP reference No.: 84001758
- Added to NRHP: April 27, 1984

The Snow Hill Site is an archeological site located near Port Deposit, Cecil County, Maryland. It was the location of a free African American community, which was established in this area by the mid-19th century. It includes the remains of several structures, a foundation and wall or floorboard, two in situ cast iron stoves, and concentrations of refuse. Only the portion of the site located on the United States Naval Training Center Bainbridge property has been tested. The only remaining standing structure from the community is a two-story, two-family duplex built in the late 19th century, which is located nearby.

It was listed on the National Register of Historic Places in 1984.
