= Lady Sings the Blues =

Lady Sings the Blues may refer to:

- "Lady Sings the Blues" (song), a 1956 song by Billie Holiday
- Lady Sings the Blues (Billie Holiday album), a 1956 album by Billie Holiday
- Lady Sings the Blues (Rebecca Ferguson album), a 2015 album by Rebecca Ferguson, consisting of cover versions of Holliday songs
- Lady Sings the Blues (book), a 1956 autobiography by Billie Holiday
- Lady Sings the Blues (film), a 1972 film about Billie Holiday
- Lady Sings the Blues (soundtrack), the soundtrack album to the 1972 film
