= Mestiza Double Consciousness =

Sociological concept

Mestiza Double Consciousness is a concept coined by Peruvian-American Sociologist Sylvanna Falcón in her study, "Mestiza Double Consciousness: The Voices of Afro-Peruvian Women on Gendered Racism". It attempts to explain how Afro-Peruvian women have become engaged in activism and organized against racism, how they have become aware of their social positions, and how they have formed a different consciousness that did not previously exist, which Falcón calls the "Mestiza Double Consciousness."

== Background ==
Sylvanna Falcón conducted qualitative research with Afro-Peruvian women participating in the World Conference Against Racism 2001. From her research, Falcón tries to understand the lives of three participants—Sofía, Mónica, and Martha—by merging a gendered view of W.E.B. Du Bois' double consciousness and an expanded view of Gloria E. Anzaldúa's mestiza consciousness frameworks. Du Bois' double consciousness alone provides an understanding of race relations in the United States from the perspective of the racialized Other, while Anzaldúa's mestiza consciousness describes a form of consciousness unique to the mestiza because Chicanas live in a space of contradiction and ambiguity unique to the [Mexico-US] borderland. However, for Falcón, both frameworks are insufficient to understand the three Afro-Peruvian women's lives. Thus, the new concept, Mestiza Double Consciousness, develops by merging the two.

== Rationale ==
According to Falcón, merging Du Bois and Anzaldúa's concepts is necessary to fully comprehend "how gendered racism shape [Sofía's, Mónica's, and Martha's] lives and why they have a desire to forge transnational solidarity with other women in the African Diaspora of the Americas". Therefore, for the concept of Mestiza Double Consciousness to exist, a gendering of Du Bois' double consciousness to include women's experience, and an expansion of Anzaldúa's mestiza consciousness to include other borderlands is needed. The comprehensive approach of the Mestiza Double Consciousness concept explains the processes that those three Afro-Peruvian women went through in their activism, involvement with organizations and political communities, and understanding of their social positions.

== Analysis ==
According to Falcón, the concept provides a more comprehensive analysis of articulation and activism around issues pertaining to race and gender that would allow scholars to retheorize (and revise) the borderlands and their related struggle". In other words, it will expand academia's view to encompass individuals who are neither male African-American nor Chicana, but suffer similar racial and gender struggles.

== Explanation ==
By using a complementary explanation of Du Bois and Anzaldúa's theoretical frameworks, the concept explains the development of mestiza double consciousness by the three Afro-Peruvian women leaders at the WCAR 2001. Mestiza Double Consciousness assumes that the roles [that of Sofía, Mónica, and Martha] occupy in their activism and organizing activities embody the political consciousness Du Bois and Anzaldúa described. However, Du Bois and Anzaldúa's perspectives are limited in their abilities to capture all the dimensions of the three Afro-Peruvian women leaders' life experiences, which are based on race, gender, and nation. The women's testimonios "show that by gendering double consciousness, we have a better understanding about how survival in their borderlands requires a navigation of multiple and intersecting worlds based on race, gender, and nation". The three Afro-Peruvian women's testimonios also show that by expanding mestiza consciousness, "we can conceptualize a borderland where the Global North and Global South meet and collide and that includes the experiences and activism of Latin American women of African descent".
