= International Association of Black Actuaries =

Organization based in the United States

- Formation: October 25, 1992
- Type: Professional association
- Headquarters: West Hartford, Connecticut
- Location: United States
- President and Director: Stephen Abrokwah, PhD, FSA, CERA, MAAA
- Vice President: Gloria Gilliam, ACAS, MAAA
- Website: BlackActuaries.org

The International Association of Black Actuaries (IABA) is a tax-exempt, nonprofit professional organization that represents black actuarial professionals and students around the world. Its members include Fellows, Associates and students of the Society of Actuaries, the Casualty Actuarial Society, the Institute and Faculty of Actuaries, and Enrolled Actuaries originating from the United States, Canada, Caribbean and African nations.

== Mission ==
IABA's mission is to contribute to an increase in the number of black actuaries and to influence the successful career development, civic growth and achievement of black actuaries.

== Organizational structure ==
IABA is a volunteer-run organization with one full-time staff member. The organization has a team of over 100 active volunteers. This volunteer group consists of college students, actuarial students and experienced actuaries.

== History ==
- October 25, 1992: Sixty-five men and women from the United States, the Caribbean and Canada attend the inaugural meeting of the National Association of Black Actuaries (NABA) in Washington, DC. An Organizing Committee, under the leadership of Garth Bernard FSA, continues to build a framework.
- October 16, 1994: The second Annual Meeting of NABA takes place in Chicago, Illinois. The name is changed to the International Association of Black Actuaries (IABA). By-laws and committees are proposed. Garth Bernard FSA becomes its first elected president.
- October 14, 1995: Boston, Massachusetts, hosts the Annual Meeting for the first time.
- September 22, 1996: The Annual Meeting is moved to the campus of Howard University in Washington, DC, which becomes IABA's “home” for four years. Christopher Allen of Morehouse College receives the first IABA scholarship. Four committees (Communications, Membership, Mentoring, and Finance) are approved and chairs named.
- September 9–10, 2000: Atlanta, Georgia, becomes the first host city in the current six-city rotation for the Annual Meeting. At this meeting, professional development is added in the form of three workshops and a rap session.
- April 4, 2001: IABA is granted 501(c)(6) status.
- August 2003: The first seven City Affiliates (Atlanta, Chicago, New York / New Jersey, Boston, Delaware Valley, Washington DC and Hartford) are formed.
- August 18, 2004: The IABA Foundation is formed and is granted 501(c)(3) status.
- December 3, 2004: The Corporate Advisory Council is formed with twelve organizations (Hewitt, Hartford, Aetna, Howard University, Towers Perrin, National African American Insurance Association (NAAIA), Mercer, DW Simpson, North Carolina Mutual Life Ins. Co., Aon, CNA and Allstate Insurance) at the offices of CNA Insurance in Chicago. It meets four times per year, with one meeting immediately preceding the Annual Meeting.
- August 5, 2005: The Annual Meeting introduces an agenda with 12 professional development sessions. The two-day meeting starts on a Friday just after lunch.
- February 23, 2007: IABA holds its first Legends Reception, to honor black actuaries who have been trailblazers. The first honoree is Robert J. Randall, FSA 1952.
- June 2007: IABA hires its first executive director.
- August 2012: IABA hosts the first IABA Actuarial Boot Camp.
- April 2013: IABA launches a state-of-the-art job board and career portal.
- August 1–2, 2014: The Annual Meeting adds Thursday-afternoon to the agenda, making the IABA Annual Meeting a full two and a half day conference.
- March 17, 2015: IABA is granted 501(c)(3) status. The IABA Foundation is then merged into IABA, allowing the organization to operate as one charitable entity.
- August 2015: Total scholarship funds awarded since 1996 exceeds $500,000.
- August 7–8, 2015: IABA Annual Meeting attendance reaches 300 for the first time.

== Past presidents ==
- Garth Bernard FSA October 1994 - September 1996
- Linda Shepherd FCAS October 1996 - August 1998
- Jeffrey Johnson FSA September 1998 - August 2000
- Sharon Robinson FCAS September 2000 - August 2002
- Stafford Thompson
- Jeffrey Johnson FSA September 2006 - December 2009
- John Robinson FSA January 2010 – December 2013
- Monique Hacker-Patterson FSA January 2013 - December 2016
- Tenesia McGruder FSA - January 2017 - December 2020
- Dwayne Husbands FSA CFA - January 2021 - December 2024
