= The National Association of Blacks in Criminal Justice =

American criminal justice organization

National Association of Blacks in Criminal Justice
- Abbreviation: NABCJ
- Formation: 1974
- Type: Nonprofit, nonpartisan association
- Purpose: Criminal justice advocacy and professional development
- Headquarters: Durham, North Carolina, U.S.
- National president: Gerard Lowe
- Website: nabcj.org

The National Association of Blacks in Criminal Justice (NABCJ) is an American nonprofit, nonpartisan membership organization concerned with criminal justice issues affecting Black people and other people of color. Founded in 1974, the association includes criminal justice professionals, students, and community leaders, including people working in law enforcement, corrections, courts, social services, academia, and faith- and community-based organizations.

== History ==
NABCJ grew out of the "Blacks in the Criminal Justice System" conference held at the University of Alabama in Tuscaloosa from February 24 to 27, 1974. The conference proceedings described the event as leading to an effort to create a continuing national organization responsive to the needs of Black people involved in, or working within, the criminal justice system.

A committee formed after the conference considered the feasibility of the organization and drafted early goals and objectives for what became NABCJ. African American Registry states that the conference created a committee to establish the association and that a substantial part of its membership came from people involved in the criminal justice process.

== Purpose and membership ==
According to NABCJ, the association focuses on issues involving legislation, law enforcement, prosecution, defense, courts, corrections, and crime prevention. Its stated mission is to address the needs, concerns, and contributions of African Americans and other people of color in the administration of equal justice.

Membership is open to professionals, paraprofessionals, nonprofessionals, students, and community leaders interested in the administration of justice.

== Leadership ==
As of 2026, NABCJ lists Gerard Lowe as its national president and Sherman P. Lea Jr. as immediate past national president.
