= Black Enterprise Business Report =

Black Enterprise Business Report is a weekly television program produced by Black Enterprise, Inc.. It airs across a range of American local television stations on varying times and days of the week. Black Enterprise also produces another show titled Our World with Black Enterprise.
