= The Quorum (coffee house) =

Coordinates: 29°57′47.3″N 90°3′33.1″W

The Quorum was a coffee house in New Orleans, known as a model for multicultural exchange in the politically and racially charged atmosphere of the 1960s. It became a frequent target of segregationist harassment in New Orleans after it opened to persons from all racial backgrounds in 1963. In 1964, police raided The Quorum and arrested 73 people with charges such as "playing guitars out of tune." Many musicians, poets and artists spent time at The Quorum including Jerry Jeff Walker.

== Documentary ==
A documentary film about racial integration and the role of this small coffee house was released in 2003. The documentary, The Quorum, was written and produced by Drs. Harriet J. Ottenheimer (Kansas State University) and Maurice M. Martinez (University of North Carolina-Wilmington). Both are alumni of the Quorum coffeehouse. The film was awarded Best Documentary at the Cine Noir, Best Documentary at the Cape Fear Independent Film Network, and was a finalist at the Atlanta Independent Black Film Festival.
