= Jermaine Hopkins =

American actor (born 1974)

- Born: Jermaine R. Hopkins; August 23, 1973 (age 52); Newark, New Jersey, U.S.
- Other names: Huggy
- Occupation: Actor
- Years active: 1988–present
- Known for: Thomas Sams – Lean on Me; Steel – Juice; Benny King – Phat Beach
- Spouse: Renee Williams
- Children: 3

Jermaine R. “Huggy” Hopkins (born August 23, 1973) is an American television and film actor. Hopkins is best known for his roles as Dupree on The WB sitcom The Wayans Bros. from 1996 to 1998, and as Thomas Sams in the 1989 film, Lean on Me, Eric "Steel" Thurman in the 1992 crime drama thriller Juice, Benny King in the 1996 film Phat Beach and Kilo in the 1997 comedy film Def Jam's How to Be a Player.

== Career ==
Born in Newark, New Jersey, Hopkins began his acting career as a teenager. At age 14, Hopkins fell into the acting business when his mother brought him to a casting-call audition in New York for the Warner Bros. feature film Lean on Me, in which he got a starring role opposite Morgan Freeman as Thomas Sams, a misguided drug-abusing high school student. His next project Juice, directed by Ernest R. Dickerson, had him starring as Steel alongside Khalil Kain, Omar Epps, and Tupac Shakur.

Hopkins subsequently starred in the HBO worldwide release Strapped, that would be Forest Whitaker's directorial debut. Over the next two years, Hopkins appeared in episodes of Murder One and Moesha, and six episodes as Dupree on The WB's The Wayans Bros. series, before finishing production on his next film Def Jam's How to Be a Player, starring opposite Bill Bellamy and comedian Pierre Edwards.

=== Legal Issues ===
Hopkins was arrested on December 15, 2011, for attempting to purchase 200 pounds (91 kg) of marijuana from an undercover police officer. He faced up to five years in prison, but was sentenced to 30 days in jail and three years' probation. Hopkins was arrested again on October 13, 2017, in Apex, North Carolina with 5.7 pounds (2.6 kg) of marijuana in the trunk of his car. TMZ reports Hopkins pled guilty to felony possession. However, the judge suspended his four-month sentence, instead giving Hopkins 24 months of supervised probation.

== Filmography ==
=== Film ===
Year	Title	Role	Notes
1989	Lean on Me	Thomas "Sams" Sams	
1992	Juice	Eric "Steel" Thurman	
1993	Strapped	Lay Lay	TV movie
1996	Bullet	Pudgy	
1996	Phat Beach	Benny King	
1997	Riot	Young Black Man	TV movie
1997	Def Jam's How to Be a Player	Kilo	
2002	Urban Massacre	Chronic	
2007	I Wish I Had a House Like This	Drama	
2008	Cash Rules	Himself	Video
2012	Zoo	The Bearded Clam	
2020	Equal Standard	Jermaine	
2021	Asbury Park	Officer Gaston	

=== Television ===
Year	Title	Role	Notes
1991–1992	The Royal Family	Buddy	Recurring cast
1995	Murder One	Gangsta #2	Episode: "Chapter Seven"
1995	The Parent 'Hood	No Good	Episode: "Not with My Daughter"
1996	Moesha	The Kid	Episode: "Reunion"
1996–1998	The Wayans Bros.	Dupree	Recurring cast: season 3–5
2001	Law & Order: Special Victims Unit	Store Clerk	Episode: "Rooftop"
