= Uptown Comedy Club =

- Also known as: The BET Uptown Comedy Club
- Genre: Sketch comedy Stand-up comedy Variety
- Created by: Kevin Brown
- Written by: Jim Breuer; Kevin Brown; Monteria Ivey; Debra Wilson; Corwin Moore; Tracy Morgan; Flex Alexander; Ian Edwards; Paul Mooney; Joe Torry
- Directed by: Don Weiner
- Starring: Flex Alexander; Arceneaux & Mitchell; Jim Breuer; DJ Scratch; Ronda Fowler; Monteria Ivey; Little Rascal; Rob Magnotti; Tracy Morgan; Corwin Moore; Domencio 'Macio' Parrilla; Aries Spears; Debra Wilson
- Country of origin: United States
- Original language: English
- No. of seasons: 2
- No. of episodes: 44

Production
- Executive producers: André D. Brown; Kevin Brown; Bob Banner; Keith Samples; Don Weiner
- Camera setup: Multi-camera
- Running time: 60 minutes
- Production companies: Bob Banner Associates; Don Weiner Productions; Rysher Entertainment

Original release
- Network: Syndication
- Release: September 28, 1992 – March 7, 1994

Uptown Comedy Club is a sketch comedy show filmed in the Harlem neighborhood of Manhattan in New York City that aired in first-run syndication for two seasons, from 1992 until 1994. The series was produced by Bob Banner. Repeats of the series eventually found their way onto BET.

Taped before a live audience at a club in Harlem, Uptown Comedy Club provided a mixture stand-up comedy, musical guests usually from the world of hip-hop, and sketch comedy from a troupe of mostly black comics. Jim Breuer and Rob Magnotti were the only regular white cast members. Uptown Comedy Club would in hindsight, provide a springboard for future Saturday Night Live cast members Jim Breuer and Tracy Morgan and future Mad TV cast members Aries Spears and Debra Wilson. Monteria Ivey served as the host for the first season, while the regular cast members rotated in that capacity for the second. DJ Scratch meanwhile, was the resident DJ.

A recurring segment on Uptown Comedy Club was pitting stand-up comedians against each other in a game of The Dozens. The audience picked the winner.

== Cast ==
- Flex Alexander
- Arceneaux & Mitchell
- Jim Breuer
- Ronda Fowler
- Little Rascal (1993–1994)
- Rob Magnotti
- Tracy Morgan (1993–1994)
- Corwin Moore (1992–1993)
- Domencio 'Macio' Parrilla
- Aries Spears
- Debra Wilson (1992–1993)

== Special guests ==
=== Stand-ups featured ===
- Mark Anthony
- D.C. Benny
- Brooklyn Mike
- Xavier Paul Cadeau
- Ian Edwards
- Pierre Edwards
- Talent Harris
- T.P. Hearns
- Robert L. Hines
- "Hamburger" Jones
- Kevin Jordan
- Brad Lowery
- Faizon Love
- Carlos Mencia
- James McNair
- Mo'Nique
- Hugh Moore
- Mark Overton
- Dwayne Perkins
- Reynaldo Rey
- Keith Robinson
- Rickey Smiley
- Sommore
- Chris Tucker
- Sheryl Underwood

=== Musical guests featured ===
- Mary J. Blige
- Brand Nubian
- Das EFX
- Father MC
- Fat Joe
- Fu-Schnickens
- Gang Starr
- Kris Kross
- KRS-One
- Luke
- Mad Cobra
- MC Lyte
- Pharcyde
- Redman
- Pete Rock & CL Smooth
- Super Cat
- SWV
- Christopher Williams
- Wu-Tang Clan
- Yo-Yo

== Stations ==
Uptown Comedy Club aired mostly late at night on UHF stations.

City	Station
Albany	WFXL 31
Atlanta	WGNX 46
Bainbridge	WTLH 49
Boston	WLVI 56
Chicago	WGN 9
Cleveland	WUAB 43
Detroit	WXON 20
Eugene	KLSR 34
Fort Worth	KTVT 11
Houston	KHOU 11
Lakeland	WTMV 32
Lexington	WKYT 27
Los Angeles	KCAL 9
New York	WNYW 5
Norfolk	WTKR
Phoenix	KPHO 5 (season one only)
Salt Lake City	KOOG 30
San Diego	KNSD 39
San Francisco	KPIX 5
York	WPMT 43

== See also ==
- List of ViacomCBS television programs#Rysher Entertainment
