= Black American princess =

Pejorative term for upper-class black women

Black American princess (BAP) is a term for African-American women of upper- and upper-middle-class background, who possess (or are perceived to possess) a spoiled or materialistic demeanor. While carrying "valley girl" overtones of the overly materialistic and style-conscious egotist, the term has also been reclaimed as a matter of racial pride to cover an indulged, but not necessarily spoiled or shallow, daughter of the emerging buppies or black urban middle class. At best, such figures carry with them through life a sense of civic pride, and of responsibility for giving back to their community.

== History ==
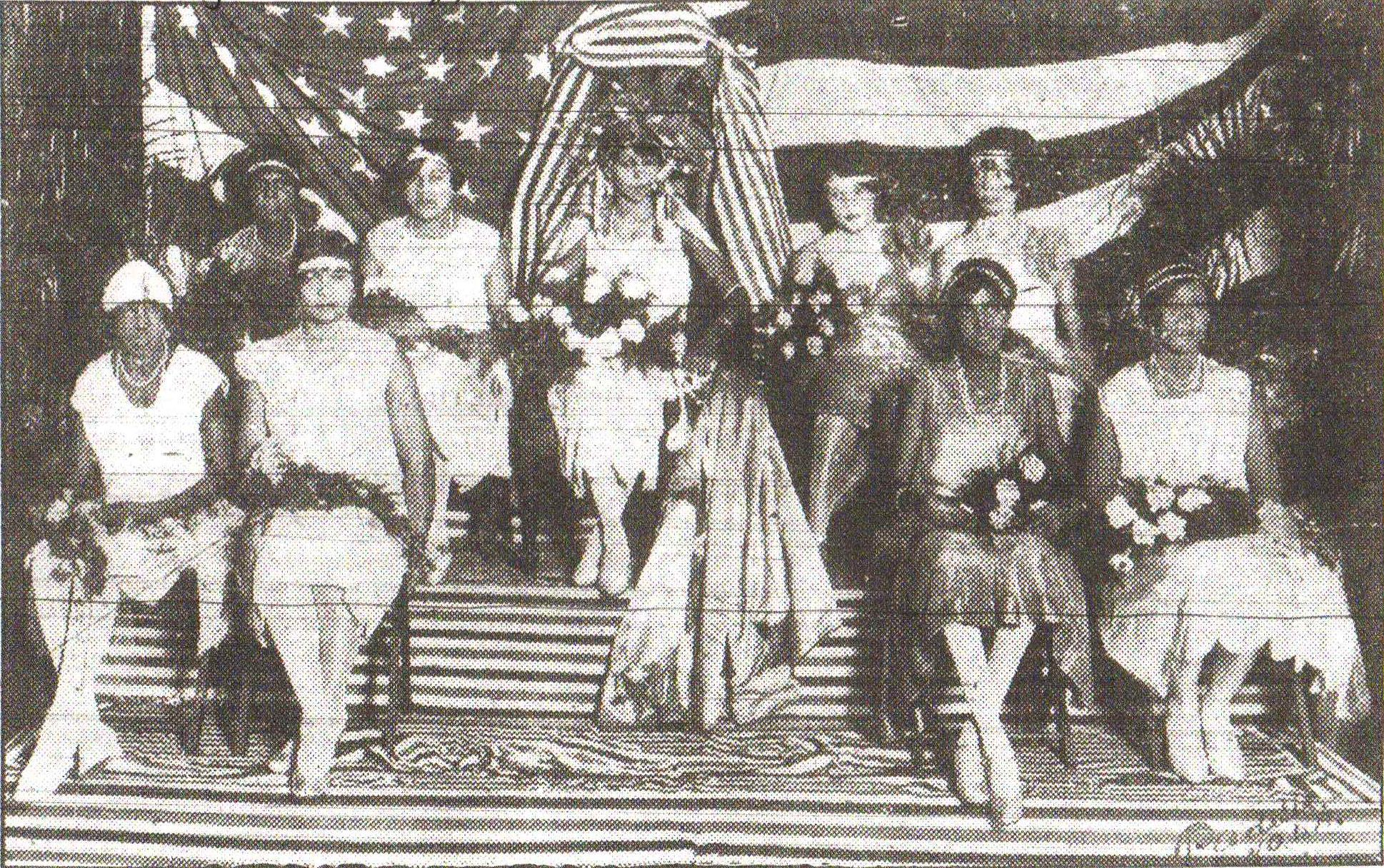
Black debutantes at the Young Men's Illinois Club Ball in New Orleans in 1927

The term can be rooted back to the end of segregation. After segregation ended, black children were put into predominantly white schools, and were able to take advantage of the opportunities they were given. The BAP stereotype can be seen as linked to the "dumb blonde" stereotype associated with white women.

== Culture ==
Stereotypically, younger BAPs are often members of Jack and Jill, a social and civic organization for upper-middle-class African-American youth. BAPs usually then go on to enroll in a "black Ivy" institution, mainly Spelman College, Hampton University, or Howard University, where many of them join either Alpha Kappa Alpha or Delta Sigma Theta sorority.

BAPs often later become members of The Girl Friends, Inc. or The Links, Incorporated, and pass in black enclaves of Sag Harbor, New York, or Oak Bluffs, Massachusetts. Many BAPs have friends in a variety of organizations, include Sigma Pi Phi fraternity and the National Association of Guardsmen, Inc.

== Cultural depictions ==
The BAP Handbook: The Official Guide to the Black American Princess, written by Kalyn Johnson, Tracey Lewis, Karla Lightfoot, and Ginger Wilson, is a 2001 humor book written by self-described BAPs. According to the guide, a black American princess is a pampered female of African-American descent born to upper-middle- or upper-class families. Her life experiences give her a "sense of entitlement", and she is accustomed to the best and nothing less.

The 1997 comedy B.A.P.S. depicts a pair of women (Halle Berry and Natalie Desselle) who become "BAPs" living off a millionaire's money.

The character of Hillary Banks (played by Karyn Parsons) from The Fresh Prince of Bel Air is a stereotypical "BAP".

== In other cultures ==
- Princess sickness, China and South Korea
- Stereotypes of Jews § Jewish-American princess
- White Anglo-Saxon Protestants
