= Chat Room (film) =

- DVD cover
- Directed by: Barry Bowles
- Written by: Barry Bowles; Carl Washington
- Produced by: Anita M. Cal; Barry Bowles; Brian Hooks; Lisa Diane Washington; Peter Zumo
- Starring: Brian Hooks; Christopher Richards; Deya Simone; Darryl Brunson; Troy Winbush
- Cinematography: Jonathon Millman
- Edited by: Krysia Szyszlo
- Music by: Jeff Christmas
- Production company: Inverness Media
- Distributed by: Artisan Entertainment; Megastar Pictures
- Release date: July 2, 2002
- Running time: 89 minutes
- Country: United States
- Language: English

Chat Room is a 2002 American comedy film directed by Barry Bowles, and starring Brian Hooks. The plot revolves around a bet between four high-school friends; whoever brings the best-looking woman to their ten-year high school reunion wins $50,000.

== Plot ==
Most people want to have a good-looking date for their high school reunion, but four guys with more at stake than just pride scramble to find the right girl for the occasion in this comedy. Max (Hooks), Drew (Darryl Brunson), and Jelly Roll (Christopher Richards) have been close friends since high school. Shortly after graduation, they made a bet — each man threw 50 dollars into a pot, and it was decided whoever brought the best-looking woman to their ten-year high school reunion would get all the money. Ten years down the line, the guys discover that after ten years of smart investing, the two hundred bucks has become a whopping 50,000 dollars, but as their reunion looms on the horizon, none of them has a girlfriend, or even a steady date. With that much money at stake, all three men (as well as J-Ron, their arrogant teammate from the high school football team, and the fourth person in on the bet) are eager to find a sexy woman with an evening to spare. The three of them end up searching for the perfect girl on the internet, visiting chat rooms in search of an available knockout. It isn't long before they realize that truth in advertising isn't all that common in the online dating game.

== Cast ==
- Brian Hooks — Max
- Christopher Richards — Jelly Roll
- Darryl Brunson — Drew
- Deya Simone — Wendy
- Troy Winbush — J-Ron
- Cindy Clark — Peaches
- LaNease Adams — Pink Panties
- Monica Mallet — Fonzi
- Barry Bowles — Undercover Cop #1
- Carl Gilliard — Detective Jeeves
