= Bryan Turner (businessman) =

American entrepreneur (born 1955 or 1956)

- Born: 1955 or 1956 (age 70–71); Winnipeg, Manitoba, Canada
- Organization(s): Priority Records, Melee Entertainment
- Children: 4

Bryan Turner is a Canadian–American entertainment executive and entrepreneur. He is perhaps best known for being the founder of Priority Records in 1985, which was “the country’s largest independent label in the mid-90s” according to the New York Times. Turner was CEO and sold a portion of the business to EMI in 1996 and the remainder in 1998.

Turner has worked with a multitude of artists, including N.W.A, Dr. Dre, Ice Cube, Snoop Dogg, and Mack 10. He has also been involved in the production of numerous films, including Friday (1995) and Next Day Air.

== Career ==
Turner moved to Los Angeles in 1980, beginning his career in the music industry at Capitol Records. He worked in special markets for one year, shortly followed by a five-year run at K-Tel International. At K-Tel, he specialized in curating compilation albums and negotiating licensing rights with labels for artists such as UTFO, Whodini, Run-DMC, and the Fat Boys.

=== Priority Records ===
After six years working at major labels, Turner founded Priority Records in 1985 and partnered with Mark Cerami. As the CEO of Priority, he was instrumental in the label's early signings. Priority's first album, which ultimately achieved gold status, was a collection entitled “Kings of Rap” in 1985. In 1986, the California Raisins were signed to Priority and sold over two million copies, achieving double platinum status.

In 1988, Priority released the debut studio album for hip-hop group N.W.A, who "billed itself as the World’s Most Dangerous Group” according to LA Times and USA Today. The album was called “Straight Outta Compton” and was made for $10,000. The group “caused a seismic shift in hip-hop when they formed N.W.A in 1986,” according to the LA Times, and “spoke the truth about life on the streets of Compton.”. While Eazy-E was working on his 2nd album, Turner received a tape copy of the album and said publicly that it was one of the best albums he had ever heard. Turner left Priority in 2002, after completing the label's sale to EMI a few years prior.

=== Film ===
Turner has been involved in the creation of several films. He was an executive producer for the 1995 Friday, which starred former N.W.A member Ice Cube. Additionally, Turner was an executive producer for the 1998 I Got the Hook-Up, starring Master P, Anthony Johnson, and Gretchen Palmer.

=== Melee Entertainment ===
In 2003, Turner launched Melee Entertainment, a diverse entertainment venture in partnership with DreamWorks Records. Melee was responsible for the DVD release of “Entertainer’s Basketball Classic at Rucker Park” in 2003. Under Melee, Turner was a co-executive producer for the 2003 documentary “Ultimate Gretzky,” starring Wayne Gretzky, as well as “Riding in Vans with Boys,” starring members of the rock band Blink 182.

In 2004, Melee was an associate producer on the dance film You Got Served, starring the best-selling group B2K, which grossed $40 million through its theatrical release. In 2009, Melee released the film “Next Day Air,” starring Mos Def, Mike Epps, Donald Faison, and Wood Harris. In 2012, Melee released the film “The Under Shepherd,” with director Russ Parr and Academy Award-winning actor Louis Gossett Jr., Isaiah Washington, Lamman Rucker, Bill Cobbs, and Elise Neal. In 2017, Melee produced the horror film “The Gracefield Incident.”
