= Foolish (film) =

1999 film directed by Dave Meyers

- Theatrical release poster
- Directed by: Dave Meyers
- Written by: Eddie Griffin
- Produced by: Master P
- Starring: Master P; Eddie Griffin
- Cinematography: Steve Gainer
- Edited by: Anna Celada; Chris Davis
- Music by: Lisa Coleman; Wendy Melvoin
- Distributed by: Artisan Entertainment; No Limit Films
- Release date: April 9, 1999
- Running time: 84 minutes
- Language: English
- Box office: $6 million

Foolish is a 1999 comedy drama film directed by Dave Meyers (in his feature film directorial debut), and starring Master P and Eddie Griffin. It was No Limit Films second theatrical release after I Got the Hook-Up.

== Plot ==
Quentin "Fifty Dollah" Waise is involved in a crime ring that earns him good money but worries his grandmother Odetta, who dotes on him and encourages him to follow a more righteous path. Fifty Dollah's brother Miles "Foolish" Waise, who got his nickname from Odetta, is an aspiring comedian, but his inability to get his career going convinces his older sibling he's wasting his talents. The movie pays homage to several of Griffin's idols, such as Redd Foxx, Robin Harris and Sammy Davis Jr. who appear as feet under restroom stalls while he prepares to perform.

His idols inspire Foolish to do well in his shows, which are widely attended and scheduled last to keep the bar customers drinking, but he has home trouble with his girlfriend and their son, and after the death of his grandmother, seems unable either to keep a gig or to move on. Fifty Dollah tries to give him the push he needs and tries to get his own life in order, but is distracted both by problems with criminal leader Eldorado Ron and by a painful love triangle with his brother and the girl they both like named Desiree.

== Cast ==
- Master P as Quentin "Fifty Dollah" Waise
- Eddie Griffin as Miles "Foolish" Waise
- Amie Petersen as Desiree
- Frank Sivero as Giovanni
- Daphne Duplaix as Clarisse
- Jonathan Banks as "Numbers"
- Andrew Dice Clay as Ron "Eldorado Ron"
- Sven-Ole Thorsen as Paris
- Marla Gibbs as Odetta Waise
- Traci Bingham as Simone
- Bill Nunn as Jimmy Beck
- Clifton Powell as Everette Washington
- AJ Johnson as Himself
- Traequon Tolbert as Miles Waise Jr.
- Brion James as Ruben Reyes, Talent Scout (uncredited)

== Soundtrack ==
A soundtrack containing hip hop music was released on March 23, 1999, by No Limit Records. It peaked at #32 on the Billboard 200 and #10 on the Top R&B/Hip-Hop Albums.

== Reception ==
On the review aggregator website Rotten Tomatoes, 0% of 16 critics' reviews are positive.
