= B.A.P.S. =

1997 film by Robert Townsend

Black American Princesses
- Theatrical release poster
- Directed by: Robert Townsend
- Written by: Troy Byer
- Produced by: Mark Burg; Jay Stern
- Starring: Halle Berry; Martin Landau; Ian Richardson; Natalie Desselle
- Cinematography: Bill Dill
- Edited by: Patrick Kennedy
- Music by: Stanley Clarke
- Distributed by: New Line Cinema
- Release date: March 28, 1997
- Running time: 92 minutes
- Country: United States
- Language: English
- Budget: $10 million
- Box office: $7,338,279

B.A.P.S (an acronym for Black American Princesses) is a 1997 American female buddy comedy film directed by Robert Townsend and starring Halle Berry, Natalie Desselle, and Martin Landau. Two African-American young women (Berry, Desselle) that dream of a fabulous life, move to Beverly Hills, in which they are brought to the mansion of an elderly man (Landau), and experience glamour and prestige. The film was written by Troy Byer and was her first screenplay. The film received mostly negative reviews from critics, although it has since been considered a cult classic, especially for black Hollywood. In total it earned $7.3 million at the box office worldwide.

The film features several celebrity cameos, including LL Cool J, Leon Robinson, and Dennis Rodman.

== Plot ==
Denise "Nisi", and her best friend Tamika "Mickey", work at a soul food diner in Decatur, Georgia. Their plan is to one day open the world's first combination hair salon and soul food restaurant if they ever get enough money. Their boyfriends, Ali, and James hope to one day own a luxury taxi company. Nisi and Mickey hear about a contest for a video girl, where the winner will appear in a Heavy D music video, and will receive a $10,000 prize as well. Nisi and Mickey spend all their savings to fly to Los Angeles, for Nisi to compete. On the plane ride there, Nisi reads a book on etiquette and she and Mickey discuss their new beehive hairstyles, which are so wide, tall, and annoying, to where other passengers badger them, and they also block the movie projector causing the flight attendants to tell them about their hair being a distraction.

Once in Los Angeles, Nisi auditions for the Heavy D video unsuccessfully, and she is eliminated, and ejected and disqualified for attacking other contestants inadvertently and accidentally with her hair. However on their way back home, a young handsome Italian man named Antonio, who was spying on Nisi and Mickey at the auditions, offers them the same amount of money to be in a different music video, and invites them to a Beverly Hills mansion. Once they arrive at the mansion, Nisi and Mickey meet a man named Isaac, who is the Nephew of the man who owns the estate. Isaac then reveals that Antonio is actually one of the butlers at the property, and he told Nisi and Mickey, an intentional lie.

Isaac informs Nisi and Mickey, the real purpose for them being there, is to do a dying wish favor for his Uncle, the property owner, who is an elderly and very ill man named Mr. Blakemore. Nisi is to pretend to be the granddaughter of an African-American woman named Lily, that Mr. Blakemore had a long secret affair with. However he was forbidden to be with her as Mr. Blakemore's family was racist, and would not allow him to be with her, although Mr. Blakemore loved Lily more than anything in the world. Isaac promises to pay Nisi and Mickey for going along with the charade. Nisi and Mickey agree with the plan.

Mr. Blakemore welcomes Nisi and Mickey into his residence, where they interact with the head butler, Manley. Manley's traditional demeanor and behavioral expectations contrast with Nisi and Mickey's domestic habits, lifestyle choices, communication styles, and interpersonal interactions with acquaintances such as Antonio. Concurrently, Mr. Blakemore develops a favorable disposition toward Nisi and Mickey, providing them with material goods, salon services, and shared social outings.

At this time, Isaac is revealed to have an ulterior motive to sabotage Nisi and Mickey, with Antonio also working as his partner in the plan. When Mr. Blakemore takes Nisi and Mickey on outings, Isaac secretly takes photos of them, to later falsely fabricate that Nisi and Mickey are taking advantage of him. Antonio is also in on this secret plot, to where one night while having intimate time with Mickey, Antonio tricks Mickey into tampering with Mr. Blakemore's safe. Later, Antonio is shown stealing and breaking various items in the property, to later blame Nisi and Mickey. When Antonio is caught by Manley, Antonio knocks Manley out with a statue. Nisi and Mickey are awoken by the commotion, and unaware that it's Antonio and assume it's a burglar, brutally fight and beat Antonio.

The police arrive, and Antonio lies and blames Nisi and Mickey for the stolen items and disruption around the house. Although Manley defends Nisi and Mickey and tells the police it was all Antonio's doing. Although Isaac was working in collusion with Antonio, Isaac refuses to fess up to his end of the sabotage and evil plot. Antonio is arrested and taken to jail. The next day after this incident, Mr. Blakemore's lawyer Tracy Shaw, arrives. Tracy informs Mr. Blakemore, Nisi and Mickey, of Isaac's secret plan to fabricate evidence that Nisi and Mickey were stealing from Mr. Blakemore. Mr. Blakemore decides to cut all ties with Isaac, and to apologize for what happened, gives Nisi and Mickey a large check of money. However, Nisi and Mickey destroy the checks, and refuse Mr. Blakemore's money, and decide to instead stay with him in his final days.

Mr. Blakemore, Manley, Nisi and Mickey continue to bond, frequently going out on shopping trips, and nightclub outings. One night, Nisi reveals to Mr. Blakemore that she misses and loves her boyfriend Ali back in Georgia, but he acts immature at times. Mr. Blakemore tells Nisi that love is special and to not let go of Ali. Feeling guilty for deceiving Mr. Blakemore, and that she's not actually Lily's granddaughter, Nisi tells Mickey that it's time for them to go back home, as the guilt is too much for them to stay. Nisi decides to write Mr. Blakemore a goodbye letter, telling him the truth. Nisi one night decides to tour the house one last time before they leave, only to realize that Manley paid for Ali, and Mickey's estranged boyfriend James to both come to Los Angeles to stay with them. Nisi and Mickey reunite with their boyfriends, and both men promise to be better, and act more adult, and to be better providers.

Later on in the night, Mr. Blakemore has an unexpected heart attack in his sleep, and he is rushed to the hospital. Nisi tries to confess to Mr. Blakemore at his bedside, but he silences her before she can finish and passes away soon afterwards. Nisi is extremely upset that she wasn't able to tell Mr. Blakemore the truth before he passed, and still feels guilty. However, Tracy explains that Mr. Blakemore knew what was going on the entire time, and that he knew Isaac was playing a game with him, as Lily up until her death, never had any children. Mr. Blakemore was happy to have Nisi and Mickey in his life, and knew the lie wasn't their fault and it was all Isaac's doing.

Back at the mansion, Nisi, Mickey, and their boyfriends are preparing to return to Decatur. Tracy arrives and reads Mr. Blakemore's last will and testament. Mr. Blakemore gives his property, and divides up the majority of his estate and wealth to Nisi and Mickey, in which he calls the girls his "B.A.P.S", short for Black American Princesses. Mr. Blakemore also gives Manley the remaining portion of his wealth. Isaac receives nothing, and angrily storms off. The film ends with Nisi and Mickey opening their combination hair salon and restaurant, which they name "Lily'z".

== Cast ==
- Halle Berry as Denise “Nisi”
- Martin Landau as Mr. Donald Blakemore
- Ian Richardson as Mr. Manley
- Natalie Desselle-Reid (credited as Natalie Desselle) as Tamika “Mickey”
- Troy Byer as Tracy Shaw
- Luigi Amodeo as Antonio
- Jonathan Fried as Isaac
- Pierre Edwards as Ali
- A.J. Johnson as James
- Bernie Mac as Mr. Johnson
- Faizon Love as Tiger J
- Rudy Ray Moore as Nate
- LL Cool J as himself, cameo
- Leon Robinson as himself, cameo
- Heavy D as himself, cameo
- Dennis Rodman as himself, cameo

== Production ==
The film was the first screenplay written by former actress Troy Byer. Byer was disappointed by the final cut of the film, and believed that her "words had not honestly made it onto the screen". She explained that this was the first time Robert Townsend had directed a film that he had not written. She used her earnings from this film to direct her first film.

== Reception ==
=== Critical response ===
Initial reception was overwhelmingly negative. On Rotten Tomatoes, the film has a score of 15% based on 33 reviews. Audiences surveyed by CinemaScore gave the film a grade B.

Roger Ebert of The Chicago-Sun Times gave the film a rare no-stars rating, calling it "jaw-droppingly bad and stupid, a movie so misconceived I wonder why anyone involved wanted to make it” and saying it was a lapse for Townsend, Landau and Berry whom he hoped would return to making their usual better quality productions. Ebert later included the film on his "most hated" list, writing facetiously it would ease racial tensions by uniting audiences who opposed its “excruciating boredom”. Gene Siskel also applied a zero-star rating to the movie. He described it as "an embarrassing comedy", said that Martin Landau was "looking very uncomfortable in a ridiculous role" in it, and said that "the two women play into shameless stereotypes in a film without a single laugh."

Janet Maslin praised Halle Berry for her comedic performance, but described the film as a "watered-down Pretty Woman". Maslin concluded "It's good for a half-hour of humor before the fun starts to dissolve." Esther Iverem of The Washington Post wrote "Despite its idiotic promotional trailers, 'BAPS' is a very funny movie." Lisa Alspector of the Chicago Reader called it "absurdly broad comedy infused with classic emotions and set in sumptuously detailed environments". John Anderson of the Los Angeles Times wrote that "it's true that airtight storytelling isn't the reason to see "B.A.P.S."—Desselle and Berry are. But the sloppiness of Beyer's script is symptomatic of what keeps the film from being first-rate." A critic for The News & Observer called the film "humor-impaired" and its director "clueless".

In 2018, Anne Cohen of the website Refinery29 called the film a "Black cult classic" and said the film deserved better than its (at the time) 13% rating on Rotten Tomatoes. Cohen said "The fact that the film has had such a lasting impact [...] proves that the film spoke to its audience."

=== Accolades ===
1998 Acapulco Black Film Festival

- Best Actress – Halle Berry (nominated)

1997 Stinkers Bad Movie Awards

- Worst Actress – Halle Berry (nominated)

== Stage play adaptation ==
B.A.P.S. is in development to be produced as a live stage play in 2023 from film producer and playwright Je'Caryous Johnson, who also adapted to the stage other urban movies such as Two Can Play That Game (2017), Set It Off (2018) and New Jack City (2022). The play was originally slated to open in May 2020, however the COVID-19 pandemic forced the production to close. Natalie Desselle-Reid was also in preparation to reprise her role as Mickey however died in 2020. Rapper/singer Inayah Lamis will assume the role from Natalie. Angela White formerly known as Blac Chyna will also star as Nisi. The play will open in October 2023 and run previews into November 2023.
