= Def Jam's How to Be a Player =

1997 film by Lionel C. Martin

- Theatrical release poster
- Directed by: Lionel C. Martin
- Screenplay by: Mark Brown; Demetria Johnson
- Story by: Mark Brown
- Produced by: Mark Burg; Todd Baker; Russell Simmons; Preston Holmes
- Starring: Bill Bellamy; Natalie Desselle; Bernie Mac; Pierre; A.J. Johnson; J. Anthony Brown; Max Julien; Jermaine "Huggy" Hopkins; Gilbert Gottfried; Jerod Mixon; Jamal Mixon
- Cinematography: Ross Berryman
- Edited by: William Young
- Music by: Darren Floyd
- Production companies: Island Pictures; PolyGram Filmed Entertainment; Def Jam Productions
- Distributed by: Gramercy Pictures
- Release date: August 6, 1997
- Running time: 93 minutes
- Country: United States
- Language: English
- Budget: $15 million
- Box office: $14 million

Def Jam's How to Be a Player is a 1997 American sex comedy film, starring Bill Bellamy, Natalie Desselle and Bernie Mac. The film was directed by Lionel C. Martin, and written by Mark Brown and Demetria Johnson.

The How to Be a Player Soundtrack, released by Def Jam Recordings on August 5, 1997, featured the hit single "Big Bad Mamma" by Foxy Brown featuring Dru Hill.

== Plot ==
Drayton "Dray" Jackson, who works as an A&R representative for Def Jam Recordings, is a playboy with only one goal in life: to have sex with as many women as possible. He dreams that he gets caught cheating on his girlfriend, Lisa, only to wake up from the dream to remind him not to get caught. The women he sleeps with are all a secret from Lisa, who comes over to his house for a bit to see him, before heading off for work. Dray's sister, Jenny, also comes by his house to remind him about the cookout. Dray becomes fascinated with Jenny's friend Katrina, and invites her to a party his friend is hosting; she tells him that she is busy.

Jenny cannot stand Dray's way of treating women. As soon as Dray leaves, she and Katrina snoop around and find Dray's mobile black book of his women. Jenny plans to set Dray up at the party in a hostile environment, hoping that Dray, if he gets caught, will reform his ways. After Jenny and Katrina call the women and receive their numbers, they both leave.

Dray makes his daily rounds of sex with his women, including his three main ones: Robin, a married woman, Amber, a sexy thespian, and Sherri, a freaky dominatrix. Afterwards, Dray goes to the cookout briefly before continuing on to the party. When he sees all of the women there, including Jenny and Katrina, he understands that he has been set up by them. He figures out a way get all of the women out of the party, without them noticing about each other and confrontation about Dray. He then heads to Jenny and Katrina to explain that when a player is put in a hostile environment, a player doesn't reform: he adapts to the situation. Dray leaves to go home and wait for Lisa to come see him after a long day at work.

While Dray is waiting for Lisa, Katrina shows up at the last minute to apologize. However, she has become fascinated with Dray and has been fantasizing about him. Before leaving, she makes a move on Dray and they have sex, apparently fulfilling her fantasy. Lisa returns, but Katrina is able to leave without her noticing. However as Lisa changes into her nightwear, she sees a dress, bra, and heels with smears of lipstick spelling out: "Busted, Adapt." Realizing that Katrina has set him up, Dray knows that he finally got caught.

== Cast ==
- Bill Bellamy as Drayton "Dray" Jackson
- Natalie Desselle as Jennifer "Jenny" Jackson
- Bernie Mac as Buster
- Pierre as David
- Anthony Johnson as "Spootie"
- J. Anthony Brown as Uncle Snook
- Max Julien as Uncle Fred
- Jermaine "Huggy" Hopkins as "Kilo"
- Gilbert Gottfried as Tony, The Doorman
- Jerod Mixon as Kid #1
- Jamal Mixon as Kid #2
- Lark Voorhies as Lisa
- Mari Morrow as Katrina
- Bebe Drake as Mama Jackson
- Beverly Johnson as Robin
- Natashia Williams as Girl In Pink At Malibu Party
- Stacii Jae Johnson as Sherri
- Elise Neal as Nadine
- Amber Smith as Amber

== Reception ==
Rotten Tomatoes gives the film a rating of 14% from 14 reviews.

== Soundtrack ==
Year	Album	Peak chart positions		Certifications
Year	Album	U.S.	U.S. R&B	Certifications
1997	How to Be a Player: Released: August 5, 1997; Label: Def Jam	7	2	US: Gold
