= Jason's Letter =

- Directed by: Terrance Tykeem
- Written by: Terrance Tykeem
- Produced by: Terrance Tykeem
- Starring: Vivica A. Fox
- Cinematography: Jay Wasley
- Edited by: Theodore Marcini; Terrance Tykeem
- Music by: Sylvester Sessoms Jr.
- Production companies: 13th Bunker Studios; Diamond Mind Media Group
- Release date: June 11, 2017
- Running time: 94 minutes
- Country: United States
- Language: English

Jason's Letter is a 2017 American independent drama film starring Vivica A. Fox.

== Plot ==
A story of an actual 12 year old boy seeking a solution to the ongoing problem of police officers shooting unarmed African American Men in his community.

== Cast ==
- Vivica A. Fox as Sammi Brooks
- Quinton Aaron as Troy James Sr.
- Michael Paré as Brad Macaulay
- Joseph R. Gannascoli as Principle "Pratt" Prattoli
- Claudia Jordan as Mattie James
- Brian Hooks as Melvin Jacks
- Nakia Dillard as Uncle Tony
- Jamol Manigault as Jason McKey
- Thomas Walton as Officer Zinman

== Production ==
The film was shot in Dover, Delaware in January 2017. Certain locations where principal photography occurred included the Dover Public Library and City Hall, especially the mayor's office.

== Release ==
The film made its premiere on June 11, 2017 at the Schwartz Center for the Arts in Dover.
