= The BAP Handbook =

2001 humor book

- first edition, 2001
- Author: Kalyn Johnson; Karla Lightfoot; Tracey Lewis; Ginger Wilson
- Illustrator: Jane Archer
- Language: English
- Subject: Humor, nonfiction, Upper Class
- Publisher: Broadway Books; New York
- Publication date: June 5, 2001
- Publication place: United States
- Media type: Print (Paperback)
- Pages: 214
- ISBN: 0-7679-0550-4
- OCLC: 45618259

The BAP Handbook: The Official Guide to the Black American Princess is a humor book released on June 21, 2001. The book was written by friends Kalyn Johnson, Tracey Lewis, Karla Lightfoot, and Ginger Wilson, and published by Broadway Books.

It is described by its writers as a humor book intended to break stereotypes about African-American women, written in a tongue-in-cheek and satirical manner and targeted to women of all ages and backgrounds.

== Synopsis ==
A Black American Princess (BAP) is described by the book's authors as "a pampered female of African-American descent, born to an upper-middle- or upper-class family...whose life experiences give her a sense of royalty and entitlement...accustomed to the best and nothing less". Other traits of BAPs are described as "[striving] for perfection in everything [they] do", as well as abiding by the "Nine Nevers", including never embarrassing their family, never wearing nail decals and never dating a man with a press and curl. Examples of "BAP legends" are provided as Sojourner Truth, Harriet Tubman, Marian Anderson and Zora Neale Hurston, with Ruth Simmons and Diahann Carroll listed as "current legends".

== Promotion ==
The BAP Handbook was promoted on a tour that visited Detroit, Atlanta, Los Angeles, Houston, Miami and Martha's Vineyard. MAC Cosmetics sponsored the book tour, based on the book's praise of the brand's lipsticks, and provided free makeovers.

== Reception ==
Cecelie S. Berry of The New York Times calls it "wise, witty counsel". Lola Smallwood of the Chicago Tribune described it as being "mainly...about spoiled, pampered, upper-class women, who don't mind poking fun at themselves and drawing a line between the BAPs and the BAP-nots". Criticism of the book from members of the African-American community has been noted, with it being called "elitist" and "promoting 'white' values". However, Tracey Lewis has stated the values put forward in the book were "learned from [their] parents and friends. In that sense, they are black values" and that the book is "not some great sociological work or commentary".

== See also ==
- Black American Princess
- The Official Preppy Handbook
