= Built to Last (TV series) =

- Also known as: The Royale Watkins Show
- Genre: Sitcom
- Created by: Greg Garcia; Warren Hutcherson
- Starring: Royale Watkins; Denise Dowse; Geoffrey Owens; J. Lamont Pope; Jeremy Suarez; Natalie Desselle-Reid; Paul Winfield
- Composer: Tom Rizzo
- Country of origin: United States
- Original language: English
- No. of seasons: 1
- No. of episodes: 8 (5 unaired)

Production
- Executive producers: Marcus King; David W. Duclon
- Producer: Royale Watkins
- Running time: 30 minutes
- Production companies: Lightkeeper Productions; Warner Bros. Television

Original release
- Network: NBC
- Release: September 24 – October 15, 1997

Built to Last is an American sitcom television series that aired from September 24 until October 15, 1997, on NBC.

== Premise ==
Set in Washington, D.C., the series centered on Royale Watkins, who put his career on hold to help run the family business, Watkins Construction, after his father had a mild heart attack. Actor Royale Watkin's real-life father ran an actual Watkins Construction in D.C.

== Cast ==
- Royale Watkins as Royale Watkins
- Denise Dowse as Sylvia Watkins
- Geoffrey Owens as Robert Watkins
- J. Lamont Pope as Randall Watkins
- Jeremy Suarez as Ryce Watkins
- Natalie Desselle-Reid as Tammy Watkins
- Paul Winfield as Russell Watkins
- Richard Speight Jr. as Stanley Taylor

== Episodes ==
No.	Title	Directed by	Written by	Original release date	Prod. code
1	"Pilot"	Michael Zinberg	Greg Garcia & Warren Hutcherson	September 24, 1997	475317
2	"The Apple Doesn't Fall Too Far"	Rod Daniel	Phill Lewis	October 8, 1997	466951
3	"A Family Affair"	Henry Winkler	Warren Hutcherson	October 15, 1997	466953
4	"Admitting Mistakes"	Rod Daniel	Nat Faxon	Unaired	466952
5	"Best Seats in the House"	Fred Savage	Rod Daniel	Unaired	466954
6	"More Tricks Than Treats"	Henry Winkler	Rod Daniel	Unaired	466955
7	"The Car, the Loan and the Date"	Rod Daniel	Phill Lewis	Unaired	466956
8	"A Thanksgiving to Remember"	Henry Winkler	Greg Garcia	Unaired	466957
