= Phat Beach =

1996 film by Doug Ellin

- Directed by: Doug Ellin
- Written by: Ben Morris; Brian E. O'Neal; Cleveland O'Neal III; Doug Ellin
- Produced by: Cleveland O'Neal III; Eric Manes; Michael Schultz
- Starring: Jermaine Hopkins; Coolio; Brian Hooks
- Cinematography: Dave Perkal; James A. Lebovitz; Jürgen Baum
- Edited by: Tucker Stilley; Jeremy Kasten; Richard Nord
- Music by: Joseph Williams
- Distributed by: Live Entertainment; Orion Pictures Corporation
- Release date: August 2, 1996
- Running time: 88 minutes
- Country: United States
- Language: English
- Budget: $100,000
- Box office: $1.3 million

Phat Beach is a 1996 American comedy film directed by Doug Ellin, which stars Jermaine 'Huggy' Hopkins, Coolio, Brian Hooks and Gregg Vance. The movie has been considered to be "one of the greatest (and perhaps only) hip-hop beach movies of all time."

== Plot ==
Benny King, an overweight, self-conscious teen in Bakersfield, California, faces the prospect of a dismal summer when his father Carl pushes him to get a job at a hamburger joint. Carl wants Benny to develop a work ethic instead of sitting around the house all summer, writing and dreaming. Benny begrudgingly takes on the job, but continues to daydream about Candace, the girl of his dreams, and gets sidetracked by his hormonal friend Durrel Jackson.

Durrel proposes an attractive alternative to Benny—heading off to the Southern California beaches. While Benny's family is on vacation, he borrows his father's Mercedes convertible and heads to Malibu with Durrel. Though Benny and Durrel intend to sell cheap sunglasses to beach-goers so Benny can afford a poetry class, Durrel gets distracted with all the attractive women around. Durrel proceeds to enjoy hook-ups with an assortment of women, while Benny is convinced he won't meet anyone because of his size. The duo get into a variety of misadventures, including running into Coolio at a first-class hotel and signing up for a volleyball tournament when they realize they are out of money.

== Cast ==
- Jermaine 'Huggy' Hopkins as Benny King
- Brian Hooks as Durrel Jackson
- Gregg Vance as Mikey "Mikey Z"
- Claudia Kaleem as Candace Williams
- Coolio as Himself
- Eric Fleeks as Carl N. King
- Alma Collins as Janet King
- Candice Merideth as Tasha King
- Jennifer Lucienne as Denise Marie
- Sabrina De Pina as Tanya Watkins
- Tommy "Tiny" Lister as "Tiny"

== Production ==
The film was the directorial debut of Doug Ellin, who was offered the chance to direct by producer Cleveland O'Neal based on a short film he made titled The Waiter. O'Neal envisioned Phat Beach to be the first hip-hop beach movie.

Due to the film being non-union, much of the cast, with the exception of Jermaine Hopkins, consisted of unknown actors appearing in their first feature film. Before Hopkins was cast in the role of Benny, Anthony Anderson had read for the part.

== Soundtrack ==
Phat Beach (Original Motion Picture Soundtrack)

Soundtrack album to Phat Beach by various artists
- Released: August 7, 1996
- Recorded: 1995–1996
- Genres: Hip hop; R&B
- Length: 57:03
- Label: TVT Soundtrax
- Producers: Biz Markie; Chubb Rock; Clint "Payback" Sands; Danny D; Def Jef; E-40; Ephriam Galloway; Howie How; Ivan Johnson; Jere McAllister; Larry "Rock" Campbell; M. Doc; Michael Angelo Saulsberry; Sleepy Nevilles; Smoke One Productions; Tigidy Tone; Vic C

Professional ratings
Review scores
| Source | Rating |
|---|---|
| AllMusic | 4/5 stars |

The soundtrack album for the film was released on August 7, 1996, through TVT Soundtrax and consisted primarily of hip hop and R&B music. The album reached number 40 on the Top R&B Albums chart.

=== Track listing ===
| No. | Title | Producer(s) | Length |
|---|---|---|---|
| 1. | "Fatal" (performed by E-40) | E-40 | 4:03 |
| 2. | "U Gotta Go" (performed by Kinsui and The Bucwee Boiz) | Danny D | 3:25 |
| 3. | "Up to No Good" (performed by 8Ball & MJG) | Smoke One Productions | 4:18 |
| 4. | "She's Hollywood" (performed by Rod King and Solo-Loc) | Michael Angelo Saulsberry | 4:06 |
| 5. | "Gotta Have Game" (performed by The Click) | Clint "Payback" Sands | 3:41 |
| 6. | "I'm Hungry" (performed by Biz Markie) | Biz Markie | 3:35 |
| 7. | "Like Playas" (performed by Young Kyoz and Spice 1) | Tigidy Tone | 5:17 |
| 8. | "80 Ways" (performed by Def Jef) | Def Jef | 5:05 |
| 9. | "You Are My Kind of Guy" (performed by Delasaneice) | Ephriam Galloway; Ivan Johnson | 3:03 |
| 10. | "Get Tis Money Honey" (performed by Wildliffe Society) | Howie How; Sleepy Nevilles; Darryl Pete (co.); Derrick Martin (co.) | 3:43 |
| 11. | "I Want the Bomb" (performed by LaTanya) | Jere M.C.; M. Doc | 4:04 |
| 12. | "I Just Wanna (Be With You)" (performed by L.A. Ganz) | Larry "Rock" Campbell | 3:58 |
| 13. | "I Dream of You" (performed by Chubb Rock) | Chubb Rock | 4:25 |
| 14. | "Jock'n Me" (performed by MoKenStef) | Vic C. | 4:20 |
| Total length: | | | 57:03 |

== Release ==
Phat Beach received a wide theatrical release on August 2, 1996. It opened in the 22nd spot, grossing $658,614 on 408 screens. It ultimately grossed $1,383,553 domestically, making the low-budget film a financial success.

== Reception ==
At the time of release, Phat Beach received negative responses from critics who described the film as little more than a puerile sex comedy. Roger Hurlburt of the Orlando Sentinel lamented that "women are treated as brainless, money-grubbing half-wits who swoon over dirty comments, vulgar flattery and a fancy car", and added "the plot is just an excuse for audiences to gape at a group of outrageously bosomy women removing bikini tops. In Phat Beach, smarmy, sexist jokes combine with silicone to produce a laughless, truly tasteless tale. Scarcely a poignant look at the loneliness of overweight, poetry-loving, nice-boy Benny King (Jermaine "Huggy" Hopkins), this simply is a bounce-and-jiggle picture. Phat is intended to titillate through gratuitous, overripe nudity and foul-mouthed high jinks. Contrary to the ads, none of it is phresh or phunky. Phlaccid is more like it."

In contrast, Amy Wu of the Chicago Tribune gave a positive review and wrote, "Phat Beach is a fun movie, and that's all it's meant to be." She added, "Simplicity is what makes Phat Beach so enjoyable", but "behind the simplicity is something revolutionary...The cast is multiethnic, the main characters are not white and the music comes from rap artist Coolio instead of the Beach Boys". The Los Angeles Times' Kevin Thomas felt the film is familiar at points, but praised the comedic chemistry between Hopkins and Hooks, in addition to the soundtrack.

Stephen Gaydos of Variety gave a more mixed review, writing, "Cooked up for young fans of the House Party comedies and the Wayans brothers' raucous outings, Phat's bite on the genre is too bland and its gags too warmed-over to satisfy the hunger of its targeted auds." Gaydos appreciated that some of Durrel's cruder attitudes about women "are counterbalanced by Benny’s constant criticism and belief in treating women with respect." Though he felt Coolio's appearance was too brief, he concluded, "First-time helmer Doug Ellin deserves credit for steering the sub-par script without resorting to MTV-style visual gimmicks, which only would have made the situation more derivative than it already is. His greatest strength is in the handling of the perfs of Hopkins, Hooks and Vance. Hopkins’ sweet vulnerability is wasted here and would be better placed in a pic with more substance, while Hooks and Vance are a winning pair of comedic newcomers."

Over the years, the film went on to develop a cult following, with Chris Rock and Kendrick Lamar being among its fans.
