= 3 Strikes (film) =

2000 film by DJ Pooh

- Theatrical release poster
- Directed by: DJ Pooh
- Written by: DJ Pooh
- Produced by: Marcus Morton
- Starring: Brian Hooks; N'Bushe Wright; Faizon Love; David Alan Grier
- Cinematography: John Simmons
- Edited by: John Carter
- Music by: Stewart Copeland
- Production companies: Metro-Goldwyn-Mayer Pictures; MPCA; Absolute Entertainment; Lithium Entertainment Group
- Distributed by: MGM Distribution Co. (United States); United International Pictures (international)
- Release date: March 2, 2000
- Running time: 82 minutes
- Country: United States
- Language: English
- Budget: $3.4 million
- Box office: $9.8 million

3 Strikes is a 2000 American comedy film written and directed by DJ Pooh, and starring Brian Hooks, N'Bushe Wright, Faizon Love and David Alan Grier. Despite some commercial success, it was negatively received by critics. The title refers to California's habitual offender law, whereby three convictions confer an automatic life sentence.

== Plot ==
Rob Douglas has just been released from jail for the second time. Fearing a third conviction, which will result in a life sentence, he decides to go straight and leave the street life. His friend J.J. picks him up. However, the police show up and he learns that J.J. was driving a stolen car. When his friend J.J. is wounded from a shot to the buttocks and is taken into custody, Douglas learns he has been implicated in the shooting. He reaches out to his probation officer for help in proving his innocence, but is told that his best option is to simply turn himself in. J.J. is planning to have Douglas take the fall for the crime.

Douglas' mother informs him that a woman named Dahlia has information that will prove his innocence. Dahlia, who has been infatuated with Douglas ever since they were in high school, agrees to cooperate if he will have sex with her. Robert accepts her proposal. The police find out that J.J. was behind the theft and also learn that J.J. was going to frame Douglas for it. As Douglas sneaks out of Dahlia's home, the police show up and send a dog after him. Douglas manages to get to his car and a high-speed chase ensues.

At his trial, the judge dismisses the felony charges. However, since Douglas failed to check in with his probation officer after leaving prison, he is sentenced to 30 days in jail for violating his parole. His family tells Douglas that they'll pick him up when he gets release this time. An epilogue states that Douglas was eventually released from prison early due to overcrowding.

== Cast ==
- Brian Hooks as Robert "Rob" Douglas
- Antonio Fargas as Uncle Jim Douglas
- Barima McKnight as "Blue"
- Bennet Guillory as Stan Wilson
- David Alan Grier as Detective Jenkins
- David Leisure as District Attorney
- Dean Norris as Officer Roberts
- De'Aundre Bonds as J.J.
- DJ Pooh as "Trick" Turner / Taxi Driver
- E-40 as Mike
- Faizon Love as "Tone"
- George Wallace as Mr. Douglas
- Harmonica Fats as Grandpa Johnson
- Meagan Good as Buela Douglas
- Mo'Nique as Dahlia
- N'Bushe Wright as Juanita Johnson
- Phil Morris as Mr. Libowitz
- Starletta DuPois as Ms. Douglas
- Shawn Fonteno as "Big Mo"
- Rashaan Nall as "T-Bird"
- Yolanda Whittaker as Charita
- Vincent Schiavelli as Cortino
- Jeff Garcia as Valet
- Kam as inmate

=== Cameo appearances ===
- Anthony Anderson as Prison Guard (uncredited)
- Big Boy as "Dre"
- Jerry Dunphy as Himself
- Mike Epps as "Dee"

== Reception ==
=== Box office ===
The film opened at #12 at the North American box office making $3,684,704 USD in its opening weekend.

=== Critical response ===
On the review aggregator website Rotten Tomatoes, 0% of 28 critics' reviews are positive, with an average rating of 2.7/10. The website's consensus reads: "3 Strikes lacks direction and its low-brow humor isn't even that funny." Metacritic, which uses a weighted average, assigned the film a score of 11 out of 100, based on 16 critics, indicating "overwhelming dislike".

A review of the film in The New York Times by critic A. O. Scott described it as "definitely a second-string effort" with "a series of comic situations so tired you can almost hear them snore" and a "jokeless script," and noted that Hooks' performance is "like someone who flunked out of the Wayans Brothers slapstick academy." Writing in The Austin Chronicle, critic Marjorie Baumgarten reported that there is "plenty of time to kill while watching this movie because it doesn’t require attention to be paid," that it lacks "much of a story, convincing performances, or visual style," and that "the excessiveness of the foul language bombards the brain like a verbal assault." Joe Leydon of Variety called it "exuberantly rude and crude, but generally more frantic than genuinely funny".

== Soundtrack ==
A soundtrack containing hip hop music was released on February 22, 2000 by Priority Records. It peaked at the 190th position on the Billboard 200 and number 52 on the Top R&B/Hip-Hop Albums. The film's score was composed by Stewart Copeland.

== See also ==
- List of films with a 0% rating on Rotten Tomatoes
- List of hood films
