= Santa and Pete =

- Based on: Santa & Pete by Christopher Moore; Pamela Johnson
- Screenplay by: Greg Taylor
- Directed by: Duwayne Dunham
- Starring: Hume Cronyn; James Earl Jones; Flex Alexander
- Music by: Alan Williams
- Country of origin: United States
- Original language: English

Production
- Producer: Erica Fox
- Cinematography: John Newby
- Production companies: The Polson Company; Madison Avenue Productions

Original release
- Network: CBS
- Release: December 5, 1999

Santa and Pete is a 1999 American Christmas film directed by Duwayne Dunham. It was written by Greg Taylor, based on the novel by Christopher Moore and Pamela Johnson. It stars Hume Cronyn as Saint Nick, Flex Alexander as Pete, and James Earl Jones as Grandpa Nicholas. It first aired on CBS on December 5, 1999.

== Plot ==
Grandpa Nicholas is seen decorating a Christmas tree before the arrival of his daughter Cassie with her husband James and son Terence. While decorating the tree together Terence finds an ornament of Santa Claus and a second ornament Grandpa Nicholas says is Pete. Realising Terence does not know who Pete is Grandpa Nicholas starts telling him the story of Santa and Pete.

Before he was known as Santa, Santa Claus was Saint Nicholas, a Christian Bishop and Patron Saint of Children, who travels the world performing small miracles and giving presents to children. He also carries a book called the Book of Life, which contains the names of every person in the world and information about their futures. One day he is arrested by the Spanish government who suspect he is actually a spy and imprison him before he can return to his home in the Netherlands. Whilst in prison Nick meets Pete, a cook, who wishes to see the world. After talking for hours Pete decides to secretly break Nick out of prison, but is seen by guards when retrieving the Book of Life and ends up escaping with Nick.

Years later, Nick and Pete find that some of the children and their families are missing and learn that most of them have travelled to the New World/New Amsterdam and decide to follow them. Before they leave they are approached by Henry Rutgers who wishes them to deliver an engagement ring to Elizabeth Van Olden and a promise to join her as soon as he can.

Arriving in New Amsterdam Nick and Pete learn that there is hostility between the settlers and the Native Americans. After a brief meeting with Maria and Janet Dangola who invite them for Christmas dinner they next attempt to deliver the ring to Elizabeth but are unable to find her.

As there is no lodging available Nick and Pete decide to sleep in a barn where they meet Marlene, a young girl whose parents were kidnapped by Native Americans. Hitching their horses to an old carriage Nick and Pete attend a meeting with the governor and learn there are plans to attack the Native Americans and after Nick asks to meet the Native Americans the governor spitefully takes their horses and gives them a single reindeer as replacement. On Christmas Eve Nick, Pete and Marlene visit the Dangola family with presents for the children. Pete begins to fall in love with Janet, while the reindeer they have named Vixen attracts 3 other reindeer.

Nick and Pete travel to the Native American camp and Nick is identified by them as the Man with the White Beard who brings peace and prosperity and could fly. After requesting the Native Americans return Marlene's parents for the sake of peace and safety of the children the Native Americans give Nick a bright red coat as thanks. Nick and Pete begin delivering presents and find that the village tanner has made Nick some black leather boots. Arriving at the governor's house they realise there are no traditional wooden clogs to put gifts in and instead decide to go down the chimney and leave gifts in stockings instead. They also meet the governor's maid, who turns out to be Elizabeth Van Olden, and after giving her the engagement ring she gives Nick a bright red hat.

Returning to the Dangola house the Native Americans appear with Marlene's parents just as it starts snowing. Unable to navigate the snow in their carriage, Maria's husband, Big Manuel, replaces the wheels with runners, transforming it into a sleigh, now with 6 reindeer. As Santa and Pete leave, the sleigh suddenly lifts into the sky and they fly away into the night.

Back in the present Terence wakes up in the middle of the night and finds that the Book of Life is in the living room. He finds his name inside but when he tries to tell Grandpa Nicolas the book disappears and he cannot remember anything he read. In a closing monologue Grandpa Nicholas reveals that Pete is one of their family ancestors.

== Cast ==
- Hume Cronyn as Saint Nicholas/Santa Claus
- Flex Alexander as Pete
- Emily Mae Young as Marlene
- James Earl Jones as Grandpa Nicholas
- Erica Gimpel as Cassie Moore
- Benjamin Brown as James Eric Moore
- Sedrathe Gillespie as Terence Moore
- Tempestt Bledsoe as Maria Dangola
- Tracey Douglas as Janet Dangola
- Bruce A. Young as Big Manuel Dangola
- Rhyon Nicole Brown as Julia Dangola
- Ruth de Sosa as Elizabeth Van Olden
- Cooper Thornton as Henry Rutgers
- Ted Rooney as the Tanner
- David Purdham as Rev. Bogart
- Herb Mitchell as the Governor
- Miguel Perez as Spanish Officer

== Production ==
The story, adapted from the novel of the same name, comes from a Dutch legend. Jones said that he was happy to play the grandfather, as it meant that Cronyn wore Santa's uncomfortable costumes.

== Release ==
Santa and Pete first aired on CBS on December 5, 1999. It was released on DVD in the US on November 25, 2008.

== Reception ==
Ray Richmond of Variety wrote that it "delivers the requisite amount of heartwarming cheer without being too painfully maudlin". Anne Sherber of Home Media Magazine called it "fanciful and charming". Terry Kelleher of People called it "pleasant but flimsy".

== See also ==
- List of Christmas films
