= Nothin' 2 Lose =

- DVD cover
- Directed by: Barry Bowles
- Written by: Barry Bowles
- Produced by: Brian Hooks; Doug Schwab; Ken Roy; Martin C. Jones; Niko Godfrey; Tanya York
- Starring: Brian Hooks; Carl Gilliard; Cedric Pendleton; Ryan Sands; Shani Bayeté
- Cinematography: Jon Parks
- Edited by: George T. Kelly Jr.
- Music by: G. Patrick Gandy
- Distributed by: Y2G Entertainment LLC
- Release date: June 20, 2000
- Running time: 100 minutes
- Country: United States
- Language: English

Nothin' 2 Lose is a 2000 American comedy film, directed by Barry Bowles, and starring Brian Hooks and Shani Bayeté. It was also written by Bowles, and was his second directorial effort, after first working with Hooks in Q: The Movie, in 1998. The film was registered as a low-budget movie in 1999.

== Plot ==
Kwame Gatmon is a young man with a promising career as a music producer and a beautiful girlfriend, Yasmine. But Yasmine is tired of watching all of her girlfriends get married while she stands on the sidelines, and one day she gives Kwame an ultimatum—either he marries her in 30 days, or the relationship is over. Kwame is not sure what to do; while he loves Yasmine, he also likes his freedom.

But the worst part of it all is, he has not been getting much positive feedback from all of his friends who are married men. He has been unwillingly placed at a major crossroad in his life, and now he has to choose between living the carefree lifestyle he has become accustomed to, or keeping the one true love of his life.

== Cast ==
- Brian Hooks as Kwame Gatmon
- Shani Bayeté as Yasmine
- Cedric Pendleton as Scooter
- Crystal Sessums as Tymkia
- Michael A. LeMelle as Iggy
- Martin C. Jones as Lance
- Rodney J. Hobbs as Reverend Banks
- Ryan Sands as Mookie
- Kweli as Mom
- Carl Gilliard as Uncle Cooper

== Awards and nominations ==
2001 DVD Exclusive Awards

- Best Actor — Brian Hooks (nominated)
- Best Directing — Barry Bowles (nominated)
- Best Live-Action Video Premiere — Martin C. Jones (nominated)
