= Dave Meyers (director) =

American film and television director

- Born: David Charles Meyers; October 19, 1972 (age 53); Berkeley, California, U.S.
- Education: Loyola Marymount University (BFA)
- Occupations: Film director; music video director; commercial director
- Years active: 1993–present

David Charles Meyers (born October 19, 1972) is an American music video, commercial and film director.

== Early life ==
Born and raised in Berkeley, California, Dave Meyers developed his love for film while working for a local Landmark cinema at age 17. After graduating from Berkeley High School he attended Loyola Marymount University, where he studied Film Production and Philosophy.

== Career ==
After graduating from Loyola Marymount University, Meyers worked his way through the studio systems at Paramount and Fox before filming his first music video with rap crew The WhoRidas.

Inspired by a chance meeting with director Gus Van Sant, Meyers steered his focus away from feature film-making to directing music videos. He has directed more than 200 videos for popular recording artists. He has received many nominations and 12 MTV Video Music Awards including the 2003, 2011, 2017 and 2018 MTV Video Music Award for Video of the Year. In 2006, he won the Grammy Award for Best Music Video for co-directing Missy Elliott's "Lose Control".

In 1999, Meyers directed the Eddie Griffin comedy Foolish. In 2007, he directed the remake of The Hitcher, which was produced by director Michael Bay. In 2020, he directed the Netflix original series Sneakerheads. Some unreleased films he had been attached to direct in the past include The Owl, a vigilante drama, Topsiders, an adventure film set up at DreamWorks Pictures, and Breaking the Box, a heist film set up at 20th Century Fox.

Meyers is a frequent collaborator with Janet Jackson, Ariana Grande, Britney Spears, Katy Perry, Missy Elliott, Jay-Z, Snoop Dogg, Jennifer Lopez and Pink.

== Filmography ==
=== Films ===
Year	Title	Studio(s)	Notes
1999	Foolish	Artisan Entertainment; No Limit Films	
2007	The Hitcher	Rogue; Intrepid Pictures; Platinum Dunes	
2015	Volatile Love		Short film; also writer
2017	Sremm Break	Interscope Records; EarDrummers	
2022	Hustle	Netflix; Happy Madison Productions; Roth/Kirschenbaum Films; SpringHill Company	Executive producer
2024	This Is Me... Now: A Love Story	Amazon MGM Studios; BMG Rights Management; Nuyorican Productions	Co-wrote story with Jennifer Lopez and Chris Shafer

=== Commercials ===
- Adidas – "Born to Perform", "Superstar", "Unstoppable"
- Amex – "US Open"
- Apple – "Breakdance", "Dance", "Funk", "Hip Hop", "Rock", "Saturday Hip Hop", "Stereo Rock"
- AT&T – "Shedding Styles"
- Beats by Dre – "Queen of Queens"
- Britney Spears – "Curious"
- Budweiser – "Traffic Stoppers"
- CA Lottery – "Super Ticket"
- Chase – "Bank", "Office", "Rockettes"
- Chevy – "Campsite", "Diner", "Keeps Going", "Stronger Truck", "Work Gloves"
- Chrysler – "Golf Buddies"
- Cingular Wireless – "Alter Ego Guy", "Alter Ego Girl", "Bridge"
- Cîroc – "Name Change", "Smile", "Smooth"
- Citibank – "Bright Lights"
- Coors Light – "Ascent", "Snow Cave"
- Deichmann – "Graceland"
- Discover America/Brand USA – "Anthem"
- Doritos – "Anti-Ad"
- ESPN – "Heat Huddle", "Pain", "Suit Up"
- Foot Locker – "Snow Dunk"
- Frito-Lay – "Favorite Things"
- Fujifilm – "Now or never."
- Gatorade G2 – "Kevins"
- GA Lottery – "Overture"
- Gillette – "Face Abuse", "Rehydrate"
- GMC – "Blade"
- Google Pixelbook – "Go Make, Discover, Ask"
- House of Fraser – "Turn It On"
- HP – "Gwen Stefani's Say"
- Hummer – "Yacht"
- ITV – "The Brighter Side Just Got Brighter"
- John F. Kennedy Presidential Library and Museum – "Ask Not"
- Kmart – "Jimmy & Jenny"
- La Poste – "Une journée Extraordinaire"
- Lexus – "Make Some Noise"
- Lowe's – "Coloring Book", "Don't Stop", "Exploded", "Lights Across America"
- Luminary – "Listeners"
- Mercedes – "Believe", "Smart Saves the City"
- Mexico Tourism – "Chiapas", "Oaxaca"
- M&M's – "Kaleidoscope"
- New York Lottery – "Beach Party", "Traditions"
- National Domestic Violence Hotline – "It Rarely Stops", "Pictures"
- Nike – "Chamber of Fear", "Second Coming"
- NFL Network – "Hologram Al", "Human Verification", "Space Raiders"
- O2 – "Priority"
- Olay – "Glam It Up"
- Olympus – "Bridesmaids", "Tourists"
- Pacific Standard Time – "Ice Cube Celebrates the Eames"
- Parlux Fragrances – "Reb'l Fleur"
- PETA – "Thanksgiving"
- Planters – "Road Trip", "Funeral"
- Pringles – "Rave", "Road Trip", "Pool Party"
- PSP – "PSPOV"
- Reebok – "Layers Off"
- Shangri-La Hotels and Resorts – Find Your Shangri-La
- Sony Xperia – "Cloud", "Tumbleweed"
- Starbucks – "Good Feels Good"
- State Farm – "Wake Up"
- TAP Project – "Life"
- Target – "Do Your Room", "Assortment Anthem"
- Twitter – "Music Is Happening", "Summergeddon"
- Verizon – "Juke"
- Verizon Fios – "Travel Companion"
- Virgin Mobile – "Foreign Language", "Killer Comebacks"
- Volvo – "Music Video"

== Awards ==
Music Videos	Award	Project	Year
MVPA Awards	Rap Video of the Year	OutKast - "B.O.B. (Bombs Over Baghdad)"	2001
MTV Video Music Awards	Best Group Video	No Doubt - "Hey Baby"	2002
MTV Video Music Awards	Best Pop Video	No Doubt - "Hey Baby"	2002
MTV Video Music Awards	Best Hip-Hop Video	Jennifer Lopez - "I'm Real (Remix)"	2002
MTV Video Music Awards	Best Dance Video	Pink - "Get the Party Started"	2002
MTV Video Music Awards	Best Female Video	Pink - "Get the Party Started"	2002
MTV Video Music Awards	Video of the Year	Missy Elliott - "Work It"	2003
MTV Video Music Awards	Best Hip-Hop Video	Missy Elliott - "Work It"	2003
MTV Awards Japan	Best Video of the Year	Missy Elliott - "Pass That Dutch"	2004
MVPA Awards	Best Direction of a Female Artist	Missy Elliott - "Pass That Dutch"	2004
MVP Awards	Direction of a Female Artist	Missy Elliott - "Pass That Dutch"	2004
Grammy Awards	Best Music Video	Missy Elliott - "Lose Control"	2005
MTV Video Music Awards	Best Hip-Hop Video	Missy Elliott - "Lose Control"	2005
MTV Video Music Awards	Best Dance Video	Missy Elliott - "Lose Control"	2005
MTV Video Music Awards	Best Pop Video	Pink - "Stupid Girls"	2006
MTV Awards Australia	Video of the Year	The Veronicas - "4ever"	2006
MTV Video Music Awards	Best Video of the Year	Pink - "So What"	2009
MTV Video Music Awards	Video of the Year	Katy Perry - "Firework"	2011
MTV Video Music Awards	Video of the Year	Kendrick Lamar - "Humble"	2017
MTV Video Music Awards	Best Hip-Hop Video	Kendrick Lamar - "Humble"	2017
MTV Video Music Awards	Best Direction	Kendrick Lamar - "Humble"	2017
Grammy Awards	Best Music Video	Kendrick Lamar - "Humble"	2017
MTV Video Music Awards	Video of the Year	Camila Cabello - "Havana"	2018
MTV Video Music Awards	Best Pop Video	Ariana Grande - "No Tears Left to Cry"	2018
MTV Video Music Awards	Best Collaboration	Shawn Mendes and Camila Cabello - "Señorita"	2019
MTV Europe Music Award	Best Video	Taylor Swift - "ME!"	2019
Commercials	Award	Project	Year
Cannes Lions	Bronze Lion: Dance	"Apple iPod"	2004
Clio Awards	Gold Campaign: Rock, Hip-Hop, Dance	"Apple iPod"	2004
Clio Awards	Special Merit: Hip-Hop	"Apple iPod"	2004
NY ADDYS		"Lowes: Don't Stop"	2011
D&AD Awards	Wood Pencil: Cinematography for Film Advertising	"Ice Cube Celebrates the Eames"	2012
Andy Awards	Silver Distinction: Web Film / Viral	"Ice Cube Celebrates the Eames"	2012
The One Show	Interactive Merit Award	"Ice Cube Celebrates the Eames"	2012

== Books ==
- Henry Keazor, Thorsten Wübbena: Video Thrills The Radio Star. Musikvideos: Geschichte, Themen, Analysen. Bielefeld 2005, p. 79ss., p. 218ss.
