= 2001: A Space Travesty =

- DVD cover
- Directed by: Allan A. Goldstein
- Written by: Francesco Lucente; Alan Shearman
- Produced by: Martin Heldmann; Werner Koenig
- Starring: Leslie Nielsen; Ophélie Winter; Peter Egan; Ezio Greggio
- Cinematography: Sylvain Brault
- Edited by: Gaétan Huot
- Music by: Claude Foisy
- Distributed by: Helkon Filmverleih GmbH; Buena Vista International
- Release date: October 31, 2000 (Tokyo)
- Running time: 99 minutes
- Countries: Germany; Canada
- Language: English
- Budget: $30 million

2001: A Space Travesty is a 2000 satirical science fiction comedy film directed by Allan A. Goldstein and starring Leslie Nielsen, Ophélie Winter, Peter Egan, and Ezio Greggio. The film has a few sequences satirizing elements of 2001: A Space Odyssey, but is not focused on parodying that film alone. Filming took place in Canada.

== Plot ==
Marshal Richard "Dick" Dix, a special agent, saves a fast food chain restaurant from a terrorist hostage situation, much to the displeasure of Chief Halverson. He drives away and back to the police station, where he meets his boss Secretary Osgood, who is with a police worker, Cassandra Menage. She retells her experience of the cloning of the President of the United States of America, Bill Clinton, who remains unnamed throughout the film.

Dix is sent aboard a Space shuttle to the cloning facility, a Moon base called Vegan. He causes mayhem on the way there, reaches Vegan and is met by Lt. Bradford Shitzu at the security check. On the way to meet the main suspect in the cloning, Dr. Griffin Pratt, Dix experiences strange happenings throughout the colony involving certain Aliens who live there.

During a very strange incident involving an Alien about to explode, Dix meets Capt. Valentino DiPasquale, with whom he will share his quarters. Dix and Shitzu get to Dr. Pratt's quarters, and talk to him. Shitzu leaves, and Pratt takes Dix on a tour of his cloning facility. While on the tour, he meets Dr. Uschi Künstler, with whom he takes the elevator to meet Ms. Menage. Dr. Künstler deserts the two, and they make their way to a party where the suspects may be.

Pratt and Menage have dinner, while Dix has a bizarre escapade with Pratt's toupe. He leaves the party and goes to his quarters with Valentino. There he shows him his huge array of disguises. Dix gets a phone call from Ms. Menage that they are about to raid Pratt's quarters. Dix accidentally destroys his Vegan model and spreads paint all over the place. Then he stumbles on the radio, and it starts playing the cancan very loudly.

Pratt comes back to his room, only to discover that Dix escaped. He goes to his apartment and threatens him. Dix tells Menage, and soon enough, Menage gets abducted by Pratt's goons. Pratt pretends to help Dix find the President and rescue Ms. Menage, but Pratt's goons trap them. Ms. Menage uses her martial arts skills, and the President, Dix, and Menage escape back to Earth. The President they rescued is then replaced with the president in the White House, and suddenly Dix finds out that he put the clone in the White House.

They find out that Secretary Osgood is also with Pratt. Dix, the President, Menage, Valentino, Shitzu and Künstler go to a concert by the Three Tenors, who are singing Village People songs. The presidents are involved in an onstage fight, and the whole concert is ruined by Shitzu's fumbling with the control panel. Then Künstler double-crosses Dix, and reveals she is actually an alien. After Menage kills her, the president is replaced, and Menage goes with Dix to a restaurant for a date.

== Cast ==
- Leslie Nielsen as Richard 'Dick' Dix
- Ophélie Winter as Cassandra Menage
- Ezio Greggio as Captain Valentino Di Pasquale
- Peter Egan as Dr. Griffin Pratt
- Alexandra Kamp as Dr. Uschi Künstler
- Pierre Edwards as Lt. Bradford Shitzu
- David Fox as Secretary Osgood
- Sam Stone as Police Chief Halverson
- Verona Pooth as Yetta Pussel
- Michel Perron as Famous Tenor #1
- Paul Rainville as Famous Tenor #2
- Yvan Ducharme as Famous Tenor #3
- Marc Hervieux as Famous Tenor Voice #1
- Perry Canestrari as Famous Tenor Voice #2
- Carlos Ruiz as Famous Tenor Voice #3
- Tommy Schnurmacher as Conductor
- Alan Shearman as Security Gendarme
- Teresa Barnwell as Mrs. President
- David Francis as Commander Wickernuts
- Una Kay as Oona Hottenlocker-Wickernuts
- Michele Scarabelli as Opera House Security Guard
- Mark Stevens as Teenage Hostage
- Ellen David as Spaceport Customs Officer
- Armand Laroche as Backstage Gendarme
- Ima Sudonim as Ben Hur (gag credit)
- Pierre Lenoir as Inspector Wazoo
- Richard Jutras as Wardrobe Dresser
- David Millbern as Pin Head Alien #1
- Matt Smiley as Pin Head Alien #2
- Charles Dennis as Flashback Doctor
- Natalie Gray as Flashback Mother
- Betsy Soo as Opera reporter
- Ghandi as Self
- Robert Suetsugu as Sumo Wrestler #1
- Reid Asato as Sumo Wrestler #2
- Luc Campeau as Theater Manager
- Stéphanie Dumoulin-Shaw as Shuttle Flight Attendant
- Annabelle Torsein as Female Prompter
- Charles Papasoff as Sax Musician
- Jean-Marc Bisson as Alien Emcee
- Alain Bérard as Converted Alien
- Caroline André as Violinist
- Toni Sherwood as Vegan Night Club Singer
- Mikael Gravel as Vegan Night Club Singer
- Marianne Farley as Vegan Night Club Dancer
- Daniel Alvarez as Vegan Night Club Dancer
- Rachel A. Jeperson as Vegan Night Club Dancer / Concert Dancer
- Christian Vezina as Vegan Night Club Dancer
- Marion Hinz as Vegan Night Club Dancer / Concert Dancer
- Noam Alon as Vegan Night Club Dancer
- Martin Samuel as Vegan Night Club Dancer
- Jean-Luc Côté as Concert Dancer (as Jean-Luke Côté)
- Don Jordan as Concert Dancer

== Production ==
In July 1998, it was announced German production company Helkon Media would be co-financing a Leslie Nielsen vehicle then titled Space Travesty 2000.

== Reception ==
The website Need Coffee praised Nielsen's comedy style, despite the film's silliness. "If you're just in the mood for silly, puerile humor (and we all are, sometimes), or if you're under thirteen and the word 'penis' sends you into gails [sic] of laughter, then check this one out. Otherwise, skip it and check out something with a bit more sophistication." Jason James from The Nut Gallery gave the film only one star out of five, stating: "Overall I am not that big of a fan of spoof movies to begin with so it would have to be pretty special for me to like it. Even with that this is still not even that good of a spoof movie making it even harder to watch." Richard Scheib from Moria.co also gave the film a very poor review, nominating it the "Worst Film of 2001".
