= Brian Hooks =

American actor

- Born: July 27, 1973 (age 52); Bakersfield, California, U.S.
- Occupations: Actor, comedian, producer, director
- Years active: 1996–present

Brian Hooks (born July 27, 1973) is an American actor, comedian, producer and director. He is best known for his roles as protagonist Rob Douglas in the screwball comedy 3 Strikes, and Nick Delaney on the UPN television sitcom Eve. He is also known for his role as DJ in the 2004 film Soul Plane.

== Acting career ==
Brian’s first acting role occurred as the central character in the film Phat Beach (1996), which was written and directed by Doug Ellin (creator of HBO’s Entourage). The success of Phat Beach led to roles in other films, including High School High (1996), Bulworth (1998), Beloved (1998) and Austin Powers: The Spy Who Shagged Me (1999). At the same time, he had guest starring roles in many television series in the late 1990s, such as Cracker, NYPD Blue, Moesha, ER and The Parkers.

In 2000, Hooks appeared as the central character in the comedy film 3 Strikes. After that, he continued to star in, as well as executive produce, many low-budget straight-to-DVD films, including Nothin’ 2 Lose (2000), The Luau (2001), The Chatroom (2002) and Malibooty (2003).

In the following years, he began to redirect some of his efforts to the off-camera aspects of production. After developing and producing a low-budget film which produced a remarkable five-thousand percent return (5000%) on investment, Q: The Movie, Brian was first able to observe the distinct advantages, and lucrative nature, of successfully creating and developing motion pictures. As a result, and backed by major film distributors such as MGM, Brian began to produce low-budget independent films in between his acting roles.

Brian’s procession of straight-to-DVD films led to him once being called “The King of DVD” by the urban media. In 2007, he produced, co-directed and co-wrote (with Deon Taylor) and starred in the horror film Dead Tone (originally titled 7eventy5ive). He produced the film I Do… I Did (2009). Hooks was the co-host of the relationship show According to Him & Her, which aired on Centric.

In 2021, amid the COVID-19 pandemic, Brian launched his own production company called Left of Bang Entertainment. Aside from producing in-house films, Left of Bang Entertainment will provide free educational programs and mentorship opportunities for inner-city kids.

== Filmography ==
=== Film ===
Year	Title	Role	Notes
1996	Abused Again!	Eric	
1996	Phat Beach	Durrel Jackson	
1996	High School High	Anferny Jefferson	
1997	Runaway Car	Dexter 'Dex' Strang	TV movie
1998	Bulworth	Marcus Garvey	
1998	Thursday	Jary	
1998	Beloved	Young Paul	
1999	Austin Powers: The Spy Who Shagged Me	Pilot	
1999	Q: The Movie	Cedrick	
2000	3 Strikes	Rob Douglas	
2000	Nothin' 2 Lose	Kwame Gatmon	Video
2000	Confessions of a Hustler: The Movie	SB's Friend	Video
2000	Obstacles	Caffeine	
2002	Chat Room	Max	Video
2003	Malibooty!	Donzelli Waters	Video
2003	The Entrepreneurs	August	
2004	Soul Plane	DJ	
2005	Wifey	Trump	Video
2005	The Luau	Cedric	
2007	Dead Tone	Marcus	
2007	Cutlass	Leroy the Mechanic	Short
2008	Fool's Gold	Curtis	
2011	Coming & Going	Chad Collins	
2011	Laughing to the Bank with Brian Hooks	Various	
2013	The Love Section	Joel Long	
2014	Blood Lines	Willy	
2014	Basketball 3:16	Derrion Nichols	
2015	72 Hours	Tyrann	
2015	Touched	Eric	
2015	The Ghetto	Hanz	
2016	Diva Diaries	Chris	
2016	What Are the Chances?	Icy	
2016	LAPD African Cops	Jamal	
2017	Almost Amazing	Dab	
2017	Jason's Letter	Melvin Jacks	
2018	Don't Get Caught	Icy	Video
2018	All Between Us	Ray	
2018	Pierre Jackson	Rodney Chase	
2019	The Dummy	Jalonzo	
2021	Clash	Dr. Johnson	
2022	Adam + Eve	Adam	

=== Television ===
Year	Title	Role	Notes
1997	413 Hope St.	-	Episode: "A Better Place"
1998	Cracker	Stone	Episode: "If: Part 1 & 2"
1998	NYPD Blue	Michael Reed	Episode: "Weaver of Hate"
1998	Moesha	Jerome	Episode: "Mo's Money, Mo's Money, Mo's Money"
1999–2000	The Parkers	Thomas	Episode: "It's a Family Affair" & "Trading Places"
2000	ER	Dylan	Episode: "Family Matters"
2003	The Proud Family	Igloo (voice)	Episode: "Wedding Bell Blues" & "Thelma and Luis"
2003–06	Eve	Nick Delaney	Main cast
2009	Cold Case	George Watson '48/'58	Episode: "Libertyville"
2012	The Ropes	Ninja Black	Episode: "Interrogation" & "Meet the Boys"
2017	Hand of God	Big Jackie	Episode: "Telling Me Your Dreams"
2017	Grown Folks	Cousin Leon	Episode: "Cousin Leon"
2020	Family Reunion	Marcellus	Episode: "Remember When the Party Was Over?"
2023	The Proud Family: Louder and Prouder	Igloo (voice)	Episode: "BeBe" & "Juneteenth"
