= Khalil Kain =

American actor

- Born: New York City, New York, U.S.
- Occupation: Actor
- Years active: 1991–present
- Known for: Juice; Girlfriends
- Spouse: Elise Lyon

Khalil Kain is an American actor known for his role as Raheem Porter in the 1992 crime drama film Juice and as Darnell Wilkes on the UPN/CW sitcom Girlfriends (2001–2008). He is also known for his role as Patrick Peet in the 2001 horror film Bones and playing Tiger Woods in The Tiger Woods Story and for featured roles in films like Love Jones and For Colored Girls.

== Biography ==
Kain was born in Manhattan, New York City, New York. His mother, June, is of African American and Chinese descent. Kain attended Hunter College High School in New York and later relocated to California, attending Foothill High School; graduating in 1983.

== Career ==
Kain first appeared in the 1992 film Juice as Raheem. Following roles included Roosevelt Nathaniel Hobbs in the 1994 comedy drama Renaissance Man and Marvin Cox in the 1997 romantic comedy, Love Jones. Kain portrayed golfer Tiger Woods in Showtime's The Tiger Woods Story. In 2001, he teamed again with Juice director Ernest Dickerson in Bones (starring Snoop Dogg). Kain had a role in the 2003 blaxploitation biopic Baadasssss!.

Kain appeared as Darnell Wilkes, Maya's (portrayed by Golden Brooks) husband on the UPN/CW TV series Girlfriends from season 2 through the conclusion of the series. Kain replaced his Juice co-star Flex Alexander, who left to star in the sitcom One on One. Other television credits include Suddenly Susan, Friends, Blue Bloods, Living Single, Moesha, Angel, and Sister, Sister. He also played the role of Bill in the 2010 movie For Colored Girls.

Khalil Kain directed The Millennial, which he also stars in along with Erica Mena, Terayle Hill and Terri Vaughn. The world premiere for The Millennial was in August 2021 at the Hip Hop Film Festival.

== Personal life ==
Since 1996, Kain has been an avid student of martial arts and holds a black belt in Hapkido. As of 2022, he is married to artist Elise Lyon. They have two children.

== Filmography ==
=== Film ===
Year	Title	Role	Notes
1992	Juice	Raheem Porter	
1994	Renaissance Man	Pvt. Roosevelt Nathaniel Hobbs	
1995	Zooman	Zooman	TV movie
1995	In the Kingdom of the Blind	Dion	
1995	Divas	Monte	TV movie
1997	Love Jones	Marvin Cox	
1997	The Fanatics	Norman	
1998	The Tiger Woods Story	Tiger Woods (age 21)	TV movie
1998	The Velocity of Gary	Venus	
1998	Free of Eden	Taurus	TV movie
1999	Passing Glory	Heatwave Hundley	TV movie
1999	Execution of Justice	Sister Boom Boom	TV movie
1999	Intimate Betrayal	Maxwell Knight	TV movie
2000	Ali: An American Hero	Rudy Clay/Rahman Ali	TV movie
2001	Bones	Patrick Peet	
2002	Reality Check	Swope	
2003	Baadasssss!	Maurice	
2004	Gas	Mookie	
2005	Complete Guide to Guys	Gene	
2010	For Colored Girls	Bill	
2011	Paradise Broken	Pimp	
2012	Love Overboard	Russell	Video
2017	Misguided Behavior	Michael Miller	
2017	The Fearless One	Turtle	
2020	Rabbit in The Tail Lights	Derrick	Short
2020	Coming to Africa	Buck	
2021	Faceblocked	OG Mally	
2021	Homegoing	Senior	Short
2021	Caged Birds	Guerron Lucas	
2022	The Millennial	Mr. Sterling	
2022	The Bricks	Tomas Jeffries	
2023	The Chrononaut	Gary	Short

=== Television ===
Year	Title	Role	Notes
1994	Sirens	Hektor	Episode: "The First Time"
1996	Living Single	Keith	Recurring cast: season 3-4
1996	Lush Life	Lance Battista	Main cast
1996	Friends	Cal	Episode: "The One with the Race Car Bed"
1996-97	Suddenly Susan	Dwight	Episode: "Cold Turkey" & "With Friends Like These"
1998	Sister, Sister	Aaron	Episode: "Young at Heart"
1998	Any Day Now	Greg Mingo	Episode: "Making Music with the Wrong Man"
1999	Moesha	Jim Meadows	Episode: "Mis-directed Study"
2001	Angel	Gio	Episode: "That Old Gang of Mine"
2001-08	Girlfriends	Darnell Leroy Wilkes	Recurring cast: season 2–5, main cast: season 6-8
2002	CSI: Crime Scene Investigation	Jerome 'The Man' Anderson	Episode: "Fight Night"
2006	Ghost Whisperer	Randall Fisher	Episode: "Fury"
2009	Ruby & the Rockits	Crayton Jones	Episode: "It's My Party and I'll Lie If I Want to"
2009	CSI: Miami	Byron Pearce	Episode: "In Plane Sight"
2009	Medium	Malcolm Littleton	Episode: "The Future's So Bright"
2013	Elementary	Benny Charles	Episode: "Solve for X"
2013	Person of Interest	Officer Lin	Episode: "The Crossing"
2015	Blue Bloods	FBI Agent Hill	Episode: "Bad Company"
2019	Bronx SIU	Chief Wryles	Recurring cast
2021	FBI	Frank Castlewood	Episode: “Unfinished Business”
2024	The Ms. Pat Show	Kareem Richards	Episode: "Blast From The Past"
2025	Privateers	The Recruiter	3 episodes
