= David Purdham =

American character actor (born 1951)

- Born: June 3, 1951 (age 73); San Antonio, Texas, U.S.
- Occupation: Actor
- Years active: 1980–present

David Purdham (born June 3, 1951) is an American character actor who has appeared in approximately one hundred films, television series and theatre productions throughout his career.

== Career ==
Purdham was born and raised in San Antonio, Texas. His first film role was in 1984, in Lily in Love. Other film credits include Defending Your Life (1991), My Girl 2 (1994), Coronado (2003), and Fracture (2007).

Purdham has appeared in many television shows since 1980. He played Father Emmerich in the soap opera, Ryan's Hope, from 1981 to 1985, and from 1991 to 1992 he portrayed Fred Porter in the soap opera, One Life to Live. He has had recurring roles in Kate & Allie (1987), Babylon 5 (1997), Port Charles (2000), JAG (1997, 2001), The Young and the Restless (2006), General Hospital (2010–11), and more. He has also guest-starred in countless TV programs, such as the cult science fiction series, Alien Nation (1990) as Marc Guerin, reprising the role for the 1994 TV movie, Alien Nation: Dark Horizon; crime shows Matlock (1994), Diagnosis Murder (1997), Boston Legal (2005) and Perception (2015); and comedies Seinfeld (1996) and George Lopez (2004).

Purdham has also starred in several plays—a 1982 production of The Life and Adventures of Nicholas Nickleby (1982), a 1991 production of Absent Friends, and a 1993 production of The Seagull.

Purdham's voice acting includes video games and audiobooks.

== Partial filmography ==
Film

Year	Title	Role
1984	Lily in Love	Young Actor
1991	Defending Your Life	Peter
1994	My Girl 2	Mr Owett
1997	Looking for Lola	Perry Monahan
2003	Shade	Detective
2003	Coronado	Ambassador Hurrie
2007	Because I Said So	Uncle Philip
2007	Fracture	Burt Wooton
2018	Dead Men	Caleb Riggs

Television

Year	Title	Role	Notes
1980	The Edge of Night	Bobby Burroughs	3 episodes
1981	Nurse	Ben	Episode: Hear My Hands
1981–85	Ryan's Hope	Father Emmerich	7 episodes
1987	Kate & Allie	Dennis	3 episodes
1987–88	All My Children	Mort	2 episodes
1990	Murphy Brown	Pete	Episode: On the Road Again
1990	Alien Nation	Marc Guerin	Episode: Green Eyes
1992	Picket Fences	Walden	Episode: The Green Bay Chopper
1993	Judgment Day: The John List Story	Gene Syfert	TV movie
1993	L.A. Law	Mr Pike	Episode: F.O.B
1994	Dead at 21	Dr Aaron	Episode: Brain Salad
1994	Matlock	Bruce Parmelee	Episode: The Scandal
1994	Alien Nation: Dark Horizon	Marc Guerin	TV movie
1995	ER	Dr Kallis	Episode: House of Cards
1995	Naomi & Wynonna: Love Can Build a Bridge	Michael Ciminella	TV movie
1996	NYPD Blue	Dr Barkley	Episode: Auntie Maimed
1996	Seinfeld	Dr Resnick	Episode: The Package
1996	7th Heaven	Bob Jackson	Episode: Now You See Me
1997	Sliders	Dr Bolivar	Episode: Murder Most Foul
1997	Beverly Hills, 90210	Conway Holland	Episode: Jobbed
1997	Diagnosis Murder	Dr Greg Nordoff	Episode: A History of Murder
1997	Babylon 5	Captain James	3 episodes
1997	JAG	Captain Ray Hubbard	Episode: Against All Enemies
1998	Silk Stalkings	Leo Previn	Episode: Total Eclipse
1998	Air America	Ardell Huchenson	Episode: Rebound
1998	L.A. Doctors	Dr Rudman	Episode: Nate Expectations
1999	Santa and Pete	Rev. Bogart	TV movie
1999	It's Like, You Know...	Dr Mnumonroe	Episode: Memories of Me
1999	Nash Bridges	Bayard Eldon Whitaker	Episode: Kill Switch
2000	Chicago Hope	Dr Jules Forman	Episode: Letting Go
2000	The Practice	Attorney Matthew Stone	3 episodes
2000	Port Charles	Martin Barrows	6 episodes
2001	The X Files	Dr Lev	2 episodes
2001	JAG	Captain Ray Hubbard	2 episodes
2002	The Chronicle	Lionel Carson	Episode: The Stepford Cheerleaders
2002	CSI: Crime Scene Investigation	Ray-Ray Varney's Lawyer	Episode: The Accused Is Entitled
2003	Crossing Jordan	Anthony Winton	Episode: Cruel & Unusual
2004	George Lopez	Father Rick	Episode: God Needles George
2004	Joan of Arcadia	Doctor at vending machine	Episode: Jump
2005	Monk	Lyle Peck	Episode: Mr Monk and the Red Herring
2005	Boston Legal	Judge William Connolly	Episode: It Girls and Beyond
2006	The Young and the Restless	Dr Campbell	15 episodes
2007	The Unit	Mr Green	Episode: Two Coins
2009	House M.D.	Chef Anthony	Episode: The Greater Good
2009	The Closer	Mr Evans	Episode: Power of Attorney
2009	Without a Trace	Dr Ken Buford	Episode: Labyrinths
2010	Rizzoli & Isles	Senator Sam Conway	Episode: See One, Do One, Teacher One
2010–11	General Hospital	Agent Bates	8 episodes
2011	Harry's Law	Judge Horatio Smithers	Episode: Innocent Man
2015	Perception	Walter Bosworth	Episode: Meat
2015	Mistresses	Frank	Episode: Back to the Start
