= The Tiger Woods Story =

1998 television film directed by LeVar Burton

- Directed by: LeVar Burton
- Starring: Keith David
- Music by: Camara Kambon
- Country of origin: United States
- Original language: English

Production
- Running time: 90 mins.

Original release
- Release: April 12, 1998

The Tiger Woods Story is a 1998 television film directed by LeVar Burton and starring Keith David and Khalil Kain. It was nominated for three Daytime Emmy Awards in 1999.

== Cast ==
- Keith David as Earl Woods
- Khalil Kain as Tiger Woods (age 21)
- Freda Foh Shen as Tida Woods
- Gary LeRoi Gray as Tiger Woods (age 9-13)
- John Cho as Jerry Chang
- Skyler Pierce as Infant Tiger Woods
- Ski Pierce as Infant Tiger Woods
