= Dwayne Perkins =

American standup comedian

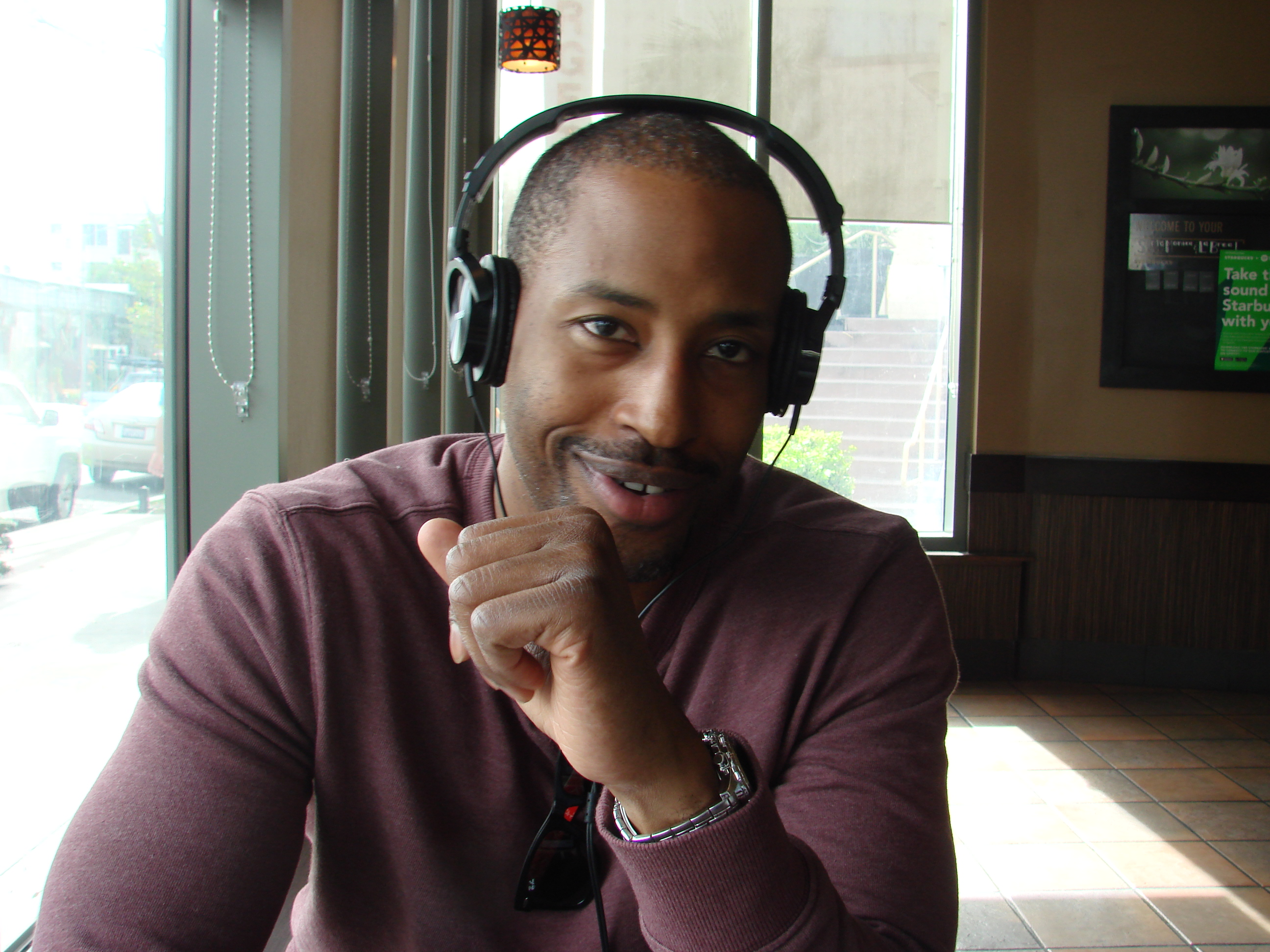
- Perkins in 2016
- Born: March 21, 1971 (age 55); Brooklyn, New York, US

Comedy career
- Years active: 1995–present
- Medium: Stand-up, television, radio

Dwayne Perkins (born March 21, 1971) is an American stand-up comedian from Brooklyn, New York, currently residing in Los Angeles. He has made appearances on Conan, Comedy Central, and as a regular correspondent on The Jay Leno Show. In August 2012, he was selected by Rolling Stone magazine as one of their "Five Comics to Watch". In October 2015, he was the artist-in-residence at the Rotterdam International Comedy Festival.

== Stage ==
Perkins earned a Bachelor of Science degree from the New York Institute of Technology. After emceeing events in college, Perkins began performing at the Uptown Comedy Club in Harlem. After graduation, he moved to Boston in 1994. While performing at The Comedy Studio in Boston in 1999, he was scouted by Late Night with Conan O'Brien, and he made his television stand-up comedy debut on that show in July of the same year. During this period, he also appeared in the New Faces of Comedy showcase at the Just for Laughs festival in Montreal.

In 2003, Perkins moved to Los Angeles. He has indicated that his primary clubs in the area are The Comedy & Magic Club and the Laugh Factory. Other notable area clubs where he has performed include the Hollywood Improv, The Comedy Store, and The Ice House. Notable clubs outside Los Angeles where he has headlined include Gotham City Comedy Club in New York City and the Punch Line in San Francisco.

In addition to performing in the United States and Canada, Perkins has also performed in Europe, the United Kingdom, South Africa, India, the United Arab Emirates, Hong Kong, Singapore, and China.

== Comedy style ==
Perkins has indicated that he prefers to appeal to broad audiences rather than to narrowly defined audience segments. His earliest stage time was in front of predominantly black audiences in Harlem, followed by a period in which he played to predominantly white audiences in Boston, and he credits both experiences with influencing his style. He has also indicated that he prefers subtler material over more confrontational approaches. While he includes material about race in his act, he has indicated that it is not the central focus of his material. His delivery style has been characterized as "likeable" and "matter-of-fact."

== Television ==
Year	Title	Notes	Ref(s)
1999–2008	Late Night with Conan O'Brien	4 episodes	
2000	Premium Blend	1 episode	
2004	Comedy Central Presents: Dwayne Perkins	1 episode	
2004	Faking It	1 episode	
2005–09	Last Call with Carson Daly	3 episodes	
2007	Last Comic Standing	2 episodes	
2007	The Late Late Show with Craig Ferguson	1 episode	
2008	History of the Joke	TV documentary	
2008	Comics Unleashed with Byron Allen	1 episode	
2009–10	The Jay Leno Show	13 episodes	
2009	The Tonight Show with Conan O'Brien	1 episode	
2011–15	Tosh.0 and Wild n out (date unknown)	4 episodes	
2012–13	Conan	2 episodes	
2014	The Arsenio Hall Show	1 episode	
2016	Take Note	Netflix	
