= Juice (1992 film) =

1992 American crime drama film directed by Ernest Dickerson

- Theatrical release poster
- Directed by: Ernest R. Dickerson
- Screenplay by: Gerard Brown; Ernest R. Dickerson
- Story by: Ernest R. Dickerson
- Produced by: David Heyman; Neal H. Moritz; Peter Frankfurt
- Starring: Omar Epps; Jermaine Hopkins; Khalil Kain; Tupac Shakur
- Cinematography: Larry Banks
- Edited by: Sam Pollard; Brunilda Torres
- Music by: Hank Shocklee and The Bomb Squad
- Production companies: Island World; Moritz-Heyman
- Distributed by: Paramount Pictures
- Release date: January 17, 1992
- Running time: 95 minutes
- Country: United States
- Language: English
- Budget: $5 million
- Box office: $20.1 million

Juice is a 1992 American crime thriller film directed by Ernest R. Dickerson in his directorial debut, written by Dickerson and Gerard Brown, and starring Omar Epps, Tupac Shakur, Jermaine Hopkins, and Khalil Kain. It follows four black youths growing up in Harlem, following their day-to-day activities, their struggles with police misconduct, rival neighborhood gangs, and their families.

The film marked the first acting roles for Epps, Kain, and Shakur. It was filmed in Harlem in 1991.

== Plot ==
Roland Bishop, Quincy "Q" Powell, Raheem Porter, and Eric "Steel" Thurman are four teenage African-American friends growing up together in Harlem. They regularly skip school, instead spending their days hanging out at Steel's apartment, at a neighborhood arcade, and also a record store where they steal LPs for Q's DJ interests. They are also harassed daily by the police and a Puerto Rican gang led by Radames.

Fed up with the harassment he and his friends have endured, Bishop decides that the group must go on to do bigger things in order to win respect. However, Q is unsure if he wants to become involved in a life of crime. One night, under Bishop's persistence, the friends decide to rob a local convenience store owned by Fernando Quiles.

However, Q is unsure of the plan, and also fears that it will affect his chances of participating in a DJ competition which he has yearned to compete in for years, although he is eventually pressured by his friends. During the robbery, Bishop fatally shoots Quiles in the head, and the group flees the scene.

The four then gather in an abandoned building where they argue over the evening's events; Q, Raheem and Steel are angry at Bishop for killing Quiles, and Raheem demands that Bishop give the gun to him. However, Bishop resists, and a struggle ensues before Bishop shoots Raheem dead. Panicking, Bishop, Q and Steel flee to another building, where Bishop threatens to kill Q and Steel if they reveal to anybody that he murdered Raheem. The detectives question and interrogate Q, Bishop and Steel about the murders of Quiles and Raheem, Bishop lies and tells the detectives that Radames killed Raheem.

Q and Steel realize that Bishop has become addicted to the thrill of killing, and they agree that Bishop is dangerous and to stay as far away from him as possible. However, while attending Raheem's funeral, they find Bishop there, who goes as far as to comfort Raheem's mother and sister, and promises to find his killer. While Q and Steel are mostly able to avoid Bishop, he eventually finds and confronts them, questioning their loyalty. Radames and his gang confronts and attacks Bishop.

Later, Bishop confronts and kills Radames, then plans to frame Q for his murders in order to cover his tracks. Fearful of Bishop, Q resorts to buying a gun for his own protection. Meanwhile, Bishop confronts Steel in an alley, accusing him of disloyalty, and shoots him. However, Steel survives the attack and is rushed to the hospital, where he informs Q's girlfriend Yolanda about Bishop and his plan to frame Q. Frustrated with the troubles brought upon him, Q throws his gun into the river and decides to confront Bishop unarmed. Q and Bishop meet, where a fight and a chase ensue when Bishop shoots Q in the left arm.

Q is subsequently chased into a building where a party is being held. While in an elevator, Bishop begins firing into a group of partygoers in an attempt to hit Q. The partygoers push Bishop out of the elevator, but Q escapes while still harmed from earlier in the chase. Q manages to disarm Bishop while he is distracted, and one of the partygoers grabs the gun that Bishop used to shoot Q. He pursues Bishop to a roof of a high-rise building. As the two get into a physical altercation, Bishop eventually falls off the ledge, but is caught by Q. Bishop begs Q not to let go, but Q eventually loses his grip instead, and Bishop falls to his death.

As Q is leaving the rooftop, a crowd from the party gathers to see what happened. An acquaintance in the crowd turns to Q and says, "Yo, you got the juice now, man." Q turns to look at him, shakes his head in disgust and trudges away.

The final scene of the film flashes back to Bishop, Q, Raheem, and Steel in happier times. As the credits roll, it's revealed Q continued his musical career and managed to get a remix on the radio.

=== Alternate ending ===
In the alternate ending, instead of Bishop accidentally falling to his death, he voluntarily loses grip of Q's hand after hearing approaching police sirens. Bishop states that he "ain’t going to jail."

== Cast ==
- Omar Epps as Quincy "Q" Powell
- Tupac Shakur as Roland Bishop
- Khalil Kain as Raheem Porter
- Jermaine Hopkins as Eric "Steel" Thurman
- Cindy Herron as Yolanda
- Vincent Laresca as Radames
- Samuel L. Jackson as Trip
- Jason Lopez as Merit
- Grace Garland as Lorraine Powell, Q's mother
- Queen Latifah as Ruffhouse MC
- Michael Badalucco as Detective Kelly

Cameos

- Oran "Juice" Jones as Snappy Nappy Dugout
- Flex Alexander as “Flex”
- Doctor Dré & Ed Lover as Contest judges
- Fab 5 Freddy as himself
- Donald Faison as student
- EPMD as Bar patrons
- Treach as a member of Radames crew
- Special Ed as Keesha's boy friend

== Production ==
The movie was filmed between March and April 1991. Daryl Mitchell, Treach, Money-B, and Donald Faison had auditioned for the role of Roland Bishop, but none were considered right for the role. Shakur accompanied Money-B to the audition and asked producer Neal H. Moritz to read. He was given 15 minutes to rehearse before the audition and secured the role. Treach and Faison landed cameo roles as a rival gang member and a high school student, respectively.

== Reception ==
The film received generally positive reviews. Roger Ebert gave the film three out of four stars, praising the film as "one of those stories with the quality of a nightmare, in which foolish young men try to out-macho one another until they get trapped in a violent situation which will forever alter their lives." Owen Gleiberman of Entertainment Weekly gave the film a "B+" grade, praising the depiction of four young characters who try to gain complete self-control over their surroundings. Gleiberman also found that:

The film is an inflammatory morality play shot through with rage and despair. Like Boyz n the Hood and Straight Out of Brooklyn, it asks: When every aspect of your environment is defined by violence, is it possible to avoid getting sucked into the maelstrom?

Dickerson also received praise for his directorial skills:

Coming out from behind Spike Lee's camera, Ernest Dickerson has instantly arrived at the forefront of the new wave of black directors. His film aims for the gut, and hits it.

Juice holds a rating of 82% on Rotten Tomatoes based on 33 reviews, with an average rating of 6.5/10. The consensus summarizes: "Juice hits hard as a tense, provocative morality play with assured direction from first-timer Ernest Dickerson and commanding central performances." On Metacritic, the film holds a score of 60 out of 100, based on 17 critics, indicating "mixed or average" reviews. The late rapper Juice Wrld also got his name from the movie.

== Soundtrack ==
Year	Album	Peak chart positions		Certifications
Year	Album	U.S.	U.S. R&B	Certifications
1991	Juice: Released: December 31, 1991; Label: MCA	17	3	US: Gold

== See also ==
- List of hood films
- Boyz n the Hood
- Menace II Society
- New Jack City
