= Man in the Mirror: The Michael Jackson Story =

2004 television film by Allan Moyle

- British DVD cover
- Written by: Claudia Salter
- Directed by: Allan Moyle
- Starring: Flex Alexander; Eugene Clark; Frederic Tucker; Lynne Cormack; Krista Rae; Amy Sloan; Peter Onorati
- Music by: Bruce Leitl
- Countries of origin: United States; Canada
- Original language: English

Production
- Executive producers: Jon Katzman; Joseph Plager; John Morayniss
- Producers: Chad Oakes; Michael Frislev
- Cinematography: David Greene
- Editor: Bridget Durnford
- Running time: 87 minutes
- Production companies: Blueprint Entertainment; Nomadic Pictures; VH1

Original release
- Network: VH1
- Release: August 6, 2004

Man in the Mirror: The Michael Jackson Story is a 2004 biographical drama television film directed by Allan Moyle and written by Claudia Salter. It stars Flex Alexander as American pop star Michael Jackson, and follows his rise to fame and subsequent events. The film takes its title from one of Jackson's songs, "Man in the Mirror". Essentially a spiritual sequel to The Jacksons: An American Dream, which discussed the Jackson family as children and young adults, the film was primarily shot in Calgary, Alberta, Canada, and aired on VH1 on August 6, 2004, six months before Jackson's criminal trial was scheduled to begin.

== Plot ==
A depressing look at the life of Michael Jackson, following the success of his sixth album, Thriller, his broken relationship with his father Joseph, his sexual abuse allegations, his marriage and divorce to Lisa Marie Presley, the birth of his children and his eventual trial.

== Cast ==
- Flex Alexander as Michael Jackson
  - Brandon Gademans as Young Michael Jackson
- Eugene Clark as Bobby (based on Bill Bray)
- Frederic Tucker as Joe Jackson
- Patricia Idlette as Katherine Jackson
- Lynne Cormack as Elizabeth Taylor
- Krista Rae as Lisa Marie Presley
- Amy Sloan as Holly
- Barbara Mamabolo as Janet Jackson
- April Telek as Debbie Rowe
- Peter Onorati as Ziggy (based on Frank DiLeo)
- Brendan Prost as Manny (based on Jordan Chandler)
- Daniel Libman as Dr. Goodman
- Aidan Wilks as David (based on Gavin Arvizo)
- Michael Tod as Sick Boy
- Brooklynn Proulx as Paris Jackson
- Greg Lawson as Detective #1
- William S. Taylor as Johnnie Cochran
- Marty Antonini as Detective #2
- Jason Anthony Griffith as Jermaine Jackson
- Gerrick Winston as Tito Jackson
- Tom Carey as Bob Giraldi
- Lou Poulis as Gardner
- Brian Martell as Thomas
- Brian Copping as Elder
- Samantha Kaine as Diana Ross
- Hugh Delaney as Judge Rodney Melville
- Talon Dunbar as Little Boy
- Carrie Schiffler as Surgeon
- Theresa Browning as Woman of the House
- Peter Skagen as Attorney
- Cedric De Souza as Martin Bashir
- Connor Schmidt as Benjamin Keough
- Keanne Dube as Riley Keough
- Jameson Trenholm as Junkie

== Award nominations ==
- 2005 – Nominated NAACP Image Award Outstanding Actor in a Television Movie, Mini-Series or Dramatic Special – Flex Alexander.

== Reception ==
The film originally aired on August 6, 2004, receiving a TV rating of TV-PG for language. The telefilm went on to receive generally negative reviews from both fans and critics alike as the film presented Michael Jackson in a very unflattering manner and did not represent most of the true story alongside criticizing the dialogue. Unlike The Jacksons: An American Dream, none of Jackson's songs are heard, only mentioned in the telefilm. Additionally, criticism was aimed at Flex's portrayal of Jackson due to their contrasting appearances.

Telelvision critic Melaine Mcfarland of the Seattle Post-Intelligencer called the "biopoem" (as described by the director Allan Moyle) "one of those tastelessly timed works meant to coax forth any sympathy we might have for Jackson's situation".

On Rotten Tomatoes, the film holds a rating of 7% from 15 reviews with the consensus: "Undone by its plodding sense of chronology and shallow storytelling, Man in the Mirror: The Michael Jackson Story never finds a compelling way to tell its subject's story."

== Home media ==
It is available on DVD on February 8, 2005, where it is distributed by Paramount Home Entertainment and is rated PG-13 for some brief language and thematic elements by the MPAA.
