= Gas (2004 film) =

- Directed by: Henry Chan
- Written by: Mark Swinton; Michael Haran
- Produced by: Claude Brooks, James Tripp-Haith, Marvin Hayes, Ralph Farquhar, Tony Smith
- Starring: Flex Alexander; Khalil Kain; Gina Ravera; Jo Marie Payton-Noble; Sticky Fingaz
- Cinematography: Donald A. Morgan
- Edited by: Brian Schnuckel
- Music by: Kurt Farquhar
- Distributed by: 20th Century Fox Home Entertainment
- Release date: 2004
- Running time: 96 minutes
- Country: United States
- Language: English

Gas is a 2004 comedy/drama film directed by Henry Chan. It stars Flex Alexander (One on One, Love... & Other 4 Letter Words) and Khalil Kain (Girlfriends, Love Jones).

== Plot ==
Upon returning to Los Angeles to attend his father's funeral, Damon (Alexander) soon learns that in order to claim his share of the family inheritance he must work alongside his brother, Mookie (Kain) — a former drug-dealer who had previously cost Damon a college scholarship — in keeping the family's long-running gas station in business for at least one year. As the siblings repeatedly butt heads over matters both great and small, they soon come to realize that it takes more than money to hold a family together.

== Cast ==
- Flex Alexander – Damon
- Khalil Kain – Mookie
- Art Evans – Will
- Brent Jennings – Mr. Garrison
- Clyde Kusatsu – Mr. Sang
- Gina Ravera – Reverend Sheila
- J.B. Smoove – Ignatius
- Jennifer Pae – Jee
- Jessica Lugo – Maria
- Jo Marie Payton-Noble – Loretta
- Kelly Perine – Ed
- Lil' Maxso – Lil' Max$o
- Mike Batayeh – Hector
- Sticky Fingaz – Craig
- Tyson Beckford – Karl
