= Carl Gilliard =

American actor, director, and producer (born 1958)

Carl Rousseau Gilliard
- Born: April 18, 1958 (age 68); Chicago, Illinois
- Occupations: Actor, film producer
- Years active: 1989–present
- Website: gilliardmedia.tv/carlgilliard/

Carl Rousseau Gilliard (born April 18, 1958) is an American actor, director, and producer.

== Career ==
Gilliard started his career working as a radio newscaster at WGPR in Detroit. He moved to Los Angeles in 1985, where he appeared in over 2 dozen plays. He has also appeared in films such as Inception, The Lost Shepherd, and Retiring Tatiana. Gilliard currently resides in Palmdale, California.

== Filmography ==
=== Film ===
Year	Title	Role	Notes
1990	Fate	Man In Disco	
1994	One Woman's Courage	Foreman	TV movie
1995	Dazzle	Alman	TV movie
1997	Sins of the Mind	Dylan Seidner	TV movie
1997	Contact	Controller	
1999	The Darwin Conspiracy	Second Baseman	TV movie
1999	And the Beat Goes On: The Sonny and Cher Story	Bumps Blackwell	TV movie
1999	Q: The Movie	Robin	
2000	Retiring Tatiana	Hassan	
2000	Nothin' 2 Lose	Uncle Cooper	Video
2002	The Chatroom	Detective Jeeves	Video
2005	Coach Carter	Store Clerk	
2005	Natural Born Salesman	Narrator/Cop	Short
2005	Fair Game	Caller #2 (voice)	
2005	Wifey	Blind Charlie	Video
2005	The Luau	Robin	
2005	Red Eye	Taxi Driver	
2005	Family Reunion	Frank Wilson	
2006	Restraining Order	Judge Brooks	
2006	Section 8	Director	
2007	Happy Anniversary, Punk!	Ty's Dad	Short
2007	Tale	Dale	Short
2007	The Mannsfield 12	Tulgate	
2007	Divine Intervention	Deacon Grier	
2009	Sweet Dreams	Officer Clayton	Short
2010	Nose Candy	Patterson	Short
2010	Inception	Lobby Sub Con	
2011	The Lost Shepherd	Pastor Eric Davis	Short
2012	Party of 12	Thomas	Short
2012	Super Cyclone	Mr. Stubbs	Video
2012	Layover	Ralph	TV movie
2013	Speaker of the House	Brian Smith	Short
2014	Meeting Gary	Gary	Short
2014	Grisly	Dr. Warner	Short
2015	Wuthering High	Mr. Josephs	TV movie
2015	The Man in 3B	Dave	
2016	36 Hour Layover	Pastor Bryant	
2016	Dead South	Silas	
2017	The Preacher's Son	Deacon Whitmore	
2017	History Day	Vernon Taylor	Short
2017	Remission	Doctor	Short
2017	A Question of Faith	Bailiff and Bill Collector (voice)	
2017	PK	Jonas	Short
2018	The Choir Director	Deacon Whitmore	
2018	Unspeakable	Doc Moses	Short
2018	All Between Us	Mr. Tillman	
2018	Doe	Detective Franca	
2019	#Truth	Pastor Johnson	
2019	Deadcon	Warren	
2019	Prisoner of Fame	Dr. Earl Carter	Short
2019	Nineteen Summers	Jefferson	
2020	CainAbel	Moses X	
2020	The Step Daddy	Reverend Douglas	
2021	Adolescents of Chymera	Daryl	
2022	Family Blood	Capt Bill Thomas	
2022	Remember Me: The Mahalia Jackson Story	John Jackson	
2022	Bin Bag Man	Beekeeper (voice)	Short
2022	Our Christmas Love Story	Marvin Jordan	
2022	Silent Night in Algona	William Hobbs	

=== Television ===
Year	Title	Role	Notes
1989-91	The Bold and the Beautiful	Kevin	Regular Cast
1990	Sunset Beach	Ned Baliss	Episode: "Sudden Withdrawal"
1991	Shannon's Deal	Officer #2	Episode: "First Amendment"
1992	Red Shoe Diaries	Mr. Evans	Episode: "Just Like That"
1993	Martin	Sax Player	Episode: "Do You Remember the Time?"
1993	Daddy Dearest	Father	Episode: "The Tortoise and the Scare"
1994	Roc	Mr. Harris	Episode: "Citizen Roc: Part 2"
1995	Tales from the Crypt	Paramedic #2	Episode: "You, Murderer"
1995	Live Shot	-	Episode: "A Death in the Family"
1995	Hang Time	Bill Nichols	Episode: "Full Court Press"
1996	The Fresh Prince of Bel-Air	Defense Attorney	Episode: "I, Clownius"
1996	Space: Above and Beyond	Ophthalmologist	Episode: "Dear Earth"
1996	Family Matters	Waiter	Episode: "Scammed"
1996	Mr. & Mrs. Smith	Carpool Man	Episode: "The Suburban Episode"
1996	L.A. Firefighters	Barkland	Episode: "Love Me Do"
1997	Sherman Oaks	Brother Clarance	Episode: "Sanford's Crisis"
1997	Union Square	Attorney	Episode: "The Audition"
1997-98	Mike Hammer, Private Eye	Fur Boy/Mobster	Episode: "Prodigal Son" & "Songbird: Part 2"
1998	Pensacola: Wings of Gold	Attorney	Episode: "Game, Set and Match"
1998	Seven Days	Technocrat	Episode: "Pilot: Part 1" & "Vows"
2002	General Hospital	Leroy	Episode: "Episode #1.9971"
2002	Robbery Homicide Division	SIS Detective #1	Episode: "Free and Clear"
2004	The Young and the Restless	Warden Oscar Paulsen	Episode: "Episode #1.8026" & "#1.8027"
2005	Strong Medicine	Principal	Episode: "Clinical Risk"
2005	The Bernie Mac Show	Mike	Episode: "The Big Payback"
2005	Barbershop	Harris	Episode: "The Politics of Money"
2005	Cold Case	Principal Parks	Episode: "Saving Patrick Bubley"
2005	Alias	Agent #1	Episode: "Fait Accompli"
2005	Sleeper Cell	NYPD Detective	Episode: "Hijack/Youmud Din (Part 1)"
2006	Freddie	Dr. Cunningham	Episode: "Freddie the Himbo"
2006	24	Ron	Episode: "Day 5: 1:00 a.m.-2:00 a.m."
2007	Private Practice	Desk Officer	Episode: "In Which Dell Finds His Fight"
2010	House	Dutch Hightower	Episode: "Baggage"
2012	CV Nation	Boss	Episode: "...This Particular Rooftop"
2014	Unsung Hollywood	Himself	Episode: "Bill Duke"
2016	Grey's Anatomy	Older Tenant	Episode: "You Haven't Done Nothin'"
2017	The Last Tycoon	Malcolm	Episode: "More Stars Than There Are in Heaven"
2018	Giants	Dr. Monroe	Recurring cast: season 2
2019	Stingers	LT. Stephens	Recurring cast
2020	For the Love of Jason	Sam Davidson	Recurring cast: season 1
2020	Two Degrees	Himself	Main cast
2020-22	The Family Business	Brother Minister	Recurring cast: season 2-4
2021	Shameless	Albert	Episode: "Survivors"
2021	Bigger	Rev Dr. Bishop Hextall	Episode: "Time Don't Give You Time"
2021	CSI: Vegas	Sidewalk Preacher	Episode: "In the Blood"
2022	Bel-Air	Henry Miles	Episode: "Yamacraw" & "Where To?"
2022	FBI: Most Wanted	Ezekiel Colson	Episode: "Iron Pipeline"
