= Natalie Desselle-Reid =

American actress (1967–2020)

- Born: Natalie Ann Desselle; July 12, 1967; Alexandria, Louisiana, U.S
- Died: December 7, 2020 (aged 53); Los Angeles, California, U.S.
- Education: Peabody Magnet High School; Grambling State University
- Occupation: Actress
- Years active: 1988–2020
- Known for: Mickey – B.A.P.S.
- Spouse: Leonard Reid (m. 2003)
- Children: 3

Natalie Ann Desselle-Reid (July 12, 1967 – December 7, 2020) was an American actress who performed in several films, including B.A.P.S., Def Jam's How to Be a Player, and Cinderella, and the television series Built to Last, For Your Love, and Eve.

== Biography ==
=== Early life ===
Desselle-Reid was one of four children born to Thelma Lee (née Sherman; 1945–1999) and Paul Desselle Jr. in Alexandria, Louisiana. Desselle-Reid attended Peabody Magnet High School, graduating in 1985. Desselle-Reid later attended Grambling State University.

=== Career ===
At Grambling, Desselle-Reid developed a deep interest in the theatre, and appeared in several productions during her time there. In 1997, she played evil step-sister Minerva in the Disney made-for-television movie Cinderella. Desselle-Reid starred in many films, including Madea's Big Happy Family, and guest starred in Family Matters. She was Janie Egins on Eve for three seasons. She is best known for her role as Mickey in B.A.P.S. and appeared in the 2017 series Ya Killin' Me.

=== Personal life ===
Desselle-Reid married Leonard Reid in 2003; they had three children.

=== Death ===
Desselle-Reid died due to colon cancer on December 7, 2020, at the age of 53. Numerous celebrities in the entertainment industry paid tribute to Desselle-Reid including Eve, Holly Robinson Peete, Issa Rae, and Madea's Big Happy Family co-stars Shannon Kane & Shad "Bow Wow" Moss. Desselle-Reid's B.A.P.S. co-star Halle Berry posted a tribute via Instagram saying "Natalie represented actual black women, not what black women are perceived to be. For that she was often underrated, passed over – deprived of the platform she truly deserved. But her light continues to shine through the people who grew up watching her, the people who knew her best and those of us who loved her. I'll love you forever my sweet friend."

== Filmography ==
=== Film ===
Year	Title	Role	Notes	Ref.
1996	Set It Off	Tanika		
1997	B.A.P.S.	Mickey		
1997	Def Jam's How to Be a Player	Jenny Jackson		
2003	Sweet Hideaway	Tiffany		
2004	Gas	Elizabeth		
2009	Divas	Tamika		
2010	Queen Victoria's Wedding	Queen Victoria Brooks	Short film	
2011	Madea's Big Happy Family	Tammy		
2011	Let Lorenzo	Tommy's Mom	Short film	
2014	Zoe Gone	Delores Lafontaine	Final film role	

=== Television ===
Year	Title	Role	Notes	Ref.
1996	Family Matters	Baby Girl	Episode: "My Big Brother"	
1997	Built to Last	Tammy Watkins	Main role	
1997	Cinderella	Minerva	Television film	
1998	Getting Personal	Vanessa	Episode: "The Wedding Zinger"	
2002	Yes, Dear	Cathy	Episode: "Kim's New Nanny"	
2003	ER	Herself (as Natalie Desselle)	Episode: "A Boy Falling Out of the Sky"	
2003–2006	Eve	Janie Egins	Main role, 66 episodes	
2010	Freaknik: The Musical	Doela Man's Mom (voice)	Television film	
2013	A Mother's Rage	Principal Davenport	Television film	
2017	Ya Killin' Me	Ex Wife	Final role	
