= I Got the Hook-Up =

1998 film directed by Michael Martin

- Theatrical release poster
- Directed by: Michael Martin
- Written by: Carrie Mungo; Leroy Douglas; Master P
- Produced by: Andrew Shack; Bryan Turner; Jonathan Heuer; Leroy Douglas; Master P; M. Cevin Cathell
- Starring: Master P; A.J. Johnson; Gretchen Palmer; Tommy "Tiny" Lister, Jr.; Helen Martin; Mia X; Anthony Boswell; Silkk the Shocker; C-Murder; Mystikal; Mr. Serv-On; John Witherspoon
- Cinematography: Antonio Calvache
- Edited by: T. David Binns
- Music by: Tommy Coster
- Production company: Dimension Films
- Distributed by: Miramax Films
- Release date: May 27, 1998
- Running time: 103 minutes
- Country: United States
- Language: English
- Budget: $3.5 million
- Box office: $10.3 million

I Got the Hook-Up is a 1998 American crime comedy film, starring Anthony Johnson, Master P, Ice Cube, C-Murder and directed by Michael Martin. This was No Limit Records' first theatrical release. The film was distributed by Dimension Films.

In the film, a duo of petty criminals sell television sets and boomboxes. After a shipment is delivered to them by mistake, they find themselves targeted by a local crime boss, by the primary enforcer of the boss, and by the Federal Bureau of Investigation.

== Plot ==
Working out of their van, Black (Master P) and Blue (Johnson) deal in TV sets and boomboxes, but then a driver mistakenly drops off a cell phone shipment. Business is on the upswing, but then the local crime boss, Roscoe, and his enforcer, T-Lay (Tom Lister Jr.), have a deal go sour and blame Black and Blue.

== Cast ==
- Master P as "Black"
- A. J. Johnson as "Blue"
- Anthony Boswell as "Little Brother"
- Frantz Turner as Dalton
- Gretchen Palmer as Lorraine "Sweet Lorraine"
- Harrison White as "Tootsie Pop"
- Helen Martin as Blue's Grandmother
- Joe Estevez as Lamar Hunt
- John Witherspoon as Mr. Mimm
- Mia X as Lola Mae
- Fiend as Roscoe
- Tommy "Tiny" Lister, Jr. as "T-Lay"
- C-Murder as "O-Money"
- Mr. Serv-On as "Mad-Dogg"
- Mystikal as "Stupid"
- Richard Keats as Jim Brady
- Jason Lopez as Merit
- Sheryl Underwood as Bessie "Bad Mouth Bessie"
- Tangie Ambrose as Carla "Nasty Mouth Carla"
- Ice Cube as Gun Runner
- Snoop Dogg as Pool Player / Bar Patron
- Silkk the Shocker as T-Lay's Friend 4#

== Critical reception ==
On the review aggregator website Rotten Tomatoes, 17% of 12 critics' reviews are positive, with an average rating of 3.3/10.

== Soundtrack ==
A soundtrack containing hip hop music was released on April 7, 1998 by No Limit Records. It peaked at #3 on the Billboard 200 and #1 on the Top R&B/Hip-Hop Albums.

== Sequel ==
=== I Got the Hook-Up 2 ===
In 2018, filming began on a sequel to the original film. Master P and Johnson returned as the stars.

I Got the Hook-Up 2 was released on streaming services and in very limited theatrical release on July 12, 2019.
