= Pierre Edwards =

American actor and director

Pierre
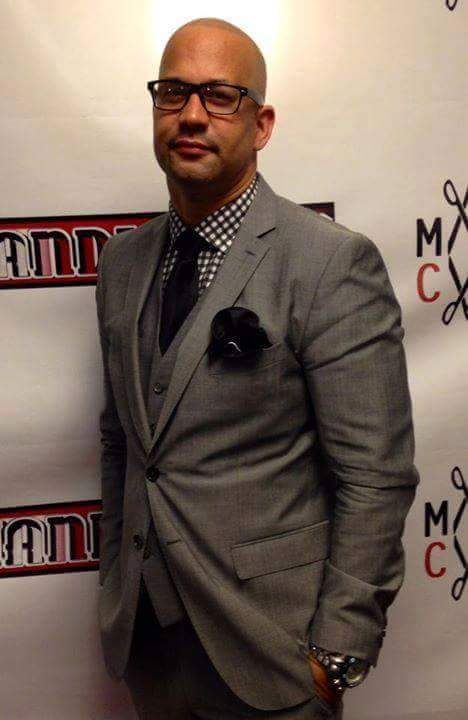
- Pierre at a concert in North Carolina (2015)
- Born: May 7, 1967 (age 59); Killeen, Texas, U.S.
- Occupations: Actor, comedian, writer, producer
- Years active: 1985–present

Pierre Edwards known mononymously as Pierre, is an American actor, director, writer, and stand-up comedian. Pierre is best known for producing, writing, directing, and starring as Dre Mitchell in For Da Love of Money (2002), and starring in such films as 2001: A Space Travesty (2000), Def Jam's How to Be a Player (1997), and B*A*P*S (1997).

== Early life ==
Pierre Edwards was born on May 7th, 1967 in Killeen, Texas to a German mother and an American father who was a soldier. Pierre was 3 weeks old when his family moved to Germany and at the age of eleven, he moved back to the United States with his family, residing in Washington, D.C.. Pierre used comedy as a defense against cultural change and bullying. In the 6th grade, he was selected to be on Good Morning America due to his humor.

Pierre began performing at comedy clubs in the DC area while in high school, with comedians such as: Martin Lawrence, Dave Chappelle, Wanda Sykes and Tommy Davidson. After being shot multiple times in 1987, Pierre decided to pursue comedy seriously. Seeing the success of his peers in Hollywood, he ventured West in 1991.

== Career ==
Pierre appeared on the first year of HBO's Def Comedy Jam, then starred on BET Comicview. Pierre was also featured on comedy shows: Showtime at the Apollo, Martin Lawrence Presents First Amendment and other late nite TV shows.

He worked alongside Oscar winner Halle Berry and Natalie Desselle when he played Nisi's boyfriend in the 1997 movie B*A*P*S, starred opposite Bill Bellamy in Def Jam's How to Be a Player, and played partner (detective) to actor Leslie Nielsen in the movie 2001: A Space Travesty. After a few small roles in The Wash and The Breaks he wrote, produced, directed and starred in the theatrical urban classic For Da Love of Money.

Pierre has also toured with R&B acts Mary J Blige, Dru Hill, New Edition, Patti LaBelle, Frankie Beverly, etc.

Pierre made numerous guest hosting appearances on the Steve Harvey Morning show. His first love is the comedy club stage, where he has headlined: Improv's (Dallas, Houston), Carolines (NYC), the FunnyBone (Shreveport La, Boise Id, Vicksburg, Ms), Uptown Comedy Corner (Atlanta) and many more. He has also performed at events such as, 'Damon Williams' annual 'New Year's Eve Comedy Bash' at Star Plaza'.

Pierre has performed for the troops home and abroad. He has also performed in comedy festivals overseas: Japan, South Africa, Germany, Amsterdam, England, etc.

Currently Pierre is working on a web series Dating Pierre, Slice Trilogy, and a self-published book "100 Homies and Phonies of Hollywood".

In mid-2020, Pierre became a lead analyst for ComedyHype News. He also hosts a podcast titled Pierre’s Panic Room.

== Filmography ==
=== Film ===
Year	Title	Role	Notes
1997	B*A*P*S	Ali	
1997	How to Be a Player	David	
1999	The Breaks	The Pimp	
2001	2001: A Space Travesty	Lt. Bradford Shitzu	
2001	The Wash	Mark	
2002	For da Love of Money	Dre Mitchell	
2008	Cut'n It Up: Chicago	Himself	Video
2009	4 Minutes	Melvin	
2011	Slice	Det. Dubois	
2011	Slice 2	Det. Dubois	
2013	Slice 3	Derek Dubois/Rally Speaker	
2014	Mad Black Men	Ron Rapper	Short
2017	Dirty South House Arrest	Uncle Kareem	
2018	Real Logic	-	Short
2024	Not Another Church Movie	Bus Driver Tyrone	

=== Television ===
Year	Title	Role	Notes
1992	An Evening at the Improv	Himself	Episode: "Episode #11.17"
1992	Def Comedy Jam	Himself	Episode: "Episode #1.5"
1994	Love Street	Tony	Episode: "Brownstone"
2007	1st Amendment Stand Up	Himself	Episode: "Annie McKnight, Iva Lashawn, Pierre, Darryl Brunson"
2008	Who's Got Jokes?	Himself	Episode: "Love on the DL"
2011	Way Black When: Primetime	Himself	Episode: "Episode #1.9"
2012	Paul Mooney: The Godfather of Comedy	Himself	TV special
2012	Uptown Comic	Himself	Episode: "Episode #1.4"
2014	Dating Pierre	Himself	Main cast
2019	Last Call	Himself	Episode: "Pilot"

=== Music video ===
Year	Artist	Song
1996	Dr. Dre	"Been There Done That"
1996	2Pac featuring Nate Dogg, Snoop Dogg & Dru Down	"All About You"
2001	Project Pat featuring Three 6 Mafia	"Don't Save Her"

=== Literature ===
Year	Title	Role
My 100 Homies & Phonies of Hollywood	2012	non-fiction
