= Flex Alexander =

American actor, comedian and dancer (born 1970)

- Born: Mark Alexander Knox; April 15, 1970 (age 56); New York City, U.S.
- Other names: Flex, Marc "Flex" Knox
- Occupations: Actor; comedian; dancer
- Years active: 1989–present
- Spouse: Shanice (m. 2000)
- Children: 2

Mark Alexander Knox (born April 15, 1970), known professionally as Flex Alexander or Flex, is an American actor, comedian and dancer. Having made his television debut as Reggie Coltrane in the critically acclaimed ABC sitcom Where I Live (1993), he became known for his role as single father Flex Washington in the UPN sitcom One on One (2001–2006), for which he was nominated for three NAACP Image Awards.

Alexander was nominated for a fourth NAACP Image Award in 2005 for his portrayal of Michael Jackson in the VH1 biographical drama Man in the Mirror: The Michael Jackson Story.

He has also appeared in films such as Juice (1992), She's All That (1999), Snakes on a Plane (2006), and The Hills Have Eyes 2 (2007).

Alexander has had recurring television roles in the UPN sitcom Girlfriends (2000–2001), the VH1 comedy-drama series Single Ladies (2012) and the ABC sitcom Mixed-ish (2020–2021).

== Early life ==
Born in Harlem, Alexander is the son of Alethia Knox and Robert Whitehead. As a teen, he began dancing in New York night clubs earning the nickname "Flex" due to his acrobatic dance skills. After being discovered by DJ Spinderella, he began touring with rap trio Salt-n-Pepa and remained with the dance troupe for three years. In addition to dancing, Alexander also choreographed for Mary J. Blige and Queen Latifah. In 1989, he made his stand-up comedy debut and eventually turned to acting, making his film debut in the 1992 film Juice. Alexander also was a regular cast member of the sketch comedy show Uptown Comedy Club from 1992 to 1994.

== Career ==
Alexander's first television role was on the short-lived 1993 ABC sitcom Where I Live, starring Doug E. Doug. Despite being critically acclaimed, the series was canceled that same year. Alexander then guest starred on episodes of Sister, Sister and The Cosby Mysteries before moving to Los Angeles in 1995 to concentrate on acting. In 1996, he landed a starring role on another short-lived sitcom Homeboys in Outer Space. The series was critically panned and canceled the following year. Later that year, Alexander co-starred in yet another short-lived series, the Steven Bochco-created Total Security. Following Total Security's run, Alexander guest starred on Brooklyn South and The Parkers, and also had roles in several films including the 1998 direct-to-video release Backroom Bodega Boyz and She's All That (1999).

From 2000 to 2001, Alexander appeared as Maya Wilkes' husband Darnell during the first season of the UPN sitcom Girlfriends. He left Girlfriends to star as single father Flexter Alexander "Flex" Barnes Washington on the UPN sitcom One on One, a series he created and produced. For his role on the series, Alexander was nominated for three NAACP Image Awards and two BET Comedy Awards. In 2004, he portrayed Michael Jackson in the VH1 television biopic Man in the Mirror: The Michael Jackson Story, which garnered him another NAACP Image Award nomination. He refused to play Jackson with prosthetics, but did mimic his voice, copied mannerisms and had a makeup job done to lighten his skin tone. He also refused to "cast judgement" over the singer's legal troubles of the time and said "we should pray for him". Alexander returned to One on One for two more seasons, however, during the last season, his character was written out and reduced to a recurring role when the show's premise was rebooted.

Following the end of One on One, Alexander had roles in the 2006 film Snakes on a Plane, opposite Samuel L. Jackson, and the 2007 horror film The Hills Have Eyes 2. He also had a role in Clement Virgo's Poor Boy's Game, with Danny Glover. Alexander's most recent role was in a 2007 episode of CSI: Miami. Flex and his wife, Shanice, had their own reality show Flex & Shanice that premiered on November 1, 2014, on the OWN.

In 2022, Flex was cast as "Pookie" in the stage adaptation of New Jack City: Live on Stage, written, produced and directed by urban playwright and film producer Je'Caryous Johnson. The production is currently on tour in nine cities.

== Personal life ==
Alexander, a born-again Christian, married R&B singer Shanice Wilson on February 19, 2000. They have two children.

== Filmography ==
=== Film ===
Year	Title	Role	Notes
1992	Juice	Contest Auditioner	
1995	Money Train	Hood	
1997	City of Industry	A-Roc	
1997	The Sixth Man	Jerrod Smith	
1998	Modern Vampires	Trigger	TV movie
1998	Ice	Kelvin	TV movie
1999	She's All That	Kadeem	
1999	The Apartment Complex	Miles	TV movie
1999	Santa and Pete	Pete	TV movie
2001	Out Cold	Anthony	
2004	Man in the Mirror: The Michael Jackson Story	Michael Jackson	TV movie
2004	Gas	Damon	
2005	Her Minor Thing	Marty	
2005	Shira: The Vampire Samurai	Willie 'Small Change Willie'	Video
2006	Snakes on a Plane	Clarence "Three G's" Dewey	
2007	Love... & Other 4 Letter Words	Arnold	
2007	Poor Boy's Game	Ossie Paris	
2007	The Hills Have Eyes 2	SGT Jeff 'Sarge' Millstone	
2007	The List	Chet	
2013	24 Hour Love	Bradford	
2013	My Sister's Wedding	Matthew	
2015	Soul Ties	Jessie	
2016	Grandma's House	Thomas	
2017	Love by the 10th Date	Preacher Hill	TV movie
2019	Maybe I'm Fine	Jeffrey	
2020	Ballbuster	Luther	
2020	Trigger	Michael Mass	
2023	The Assistant	Shawn Fields	

=== Television ===
Year	Title	Role	Notes
1992	Uptown Comedy Club	Various Characters	Main Cast: Season 1
1993	Where I Live	Reggie Coltrane	Main Cast
1994	Sister, Sister	Cold Dog	Episode: "The Concert"
1994	New York Undercover	Mecca	Episode: "The Friendly Neighborhood Dealer"
1995	Def Comedy Jam	Himself	Episode #5
1995	The Cosby Mysteries	Partygoer	Episode: "The Medium Is the Message"
1996–1997	Homeboys in Outer Space	Tyberius Walker	Main Cast
1997	Moesha	Dread	Episode: "Cold Busted"
1997	Brooklyn South	Buster	Episode: "McMurder One"
1997	Total Security	Neville Watson	Main Cast
2000	The Parkers	Andy	Episode: "J.C. Bowl"
2000–2001	Girlfriends	Darnell Wilkes	Recurring Cast: Season 1
2001–2006	One on One	Flex Washington	Main Cast: Season 1–4, Recurring Cast: Season 5
2005	Cuts	Flex Washington	Episode: "Keeping It Real"
2007	CSI: Miami	Martin Wilson	Episode: "Deep Freeze"
2010	Blue Bloods	Detective DeMarcus King	Episode: "Pilot"
2010	CSI: Miami	Beau Lendell	Episode: "Miami, We Have a Problem"
2012	Sketchy	Kyrone	Episode: "Beets by Dre"
2012	Single Ladies	James Blackwell	Recurring Cast: Season 2
2013	The Client List	The Wolf	Episode: "Unanswered Prayers"
2013	Masters of Sex	Walter	Episode: "Love and Marriage"
2014–2016	Flex & Shanice	Himself	Main Cast
2016	Lucifer	Simon Hallbrooks	Episode: "Homewrecker"
2017	Lawd Have Mercy	Himself/Host	Main Host
2018	In the Cut	Mr. Mustard	Episode: "The Big Day"
2018	Station 19	Evan Forrester	Episode: "Under the Surface"
2018	Grey's Anatomy	Evan Forrester	Episode: "Momma Knows Best"
2020–2021	Mixed-ish	George	Guest: Season 1, Recurring Cast: Season 2
2020–2024	The Family Business	Low Jack	Guest: Season 2, Recurring Cast: Season 3–5
2021	Kenan	Derek	Episode: "Flirting"
2022	American Gangster: Trap Queens	Himself	Episode: "Lonett Williams"
2023	The Black Hamptons	-	Episode: "Trouble in Paradise"
2024	The Ms. Pat Show	Pastor Jenkins	Episode: "The Book of Denise"

=== Music videos ===
Year	Artist	Song
1991	Slick Rick	"Mistakes of a Woman in Love with Other Men"
1991	Crystal Waters	"Gypsy Woman (She's Homeless)"
1992	SWV	"You're Always On My Mind"
2006	Shanice	"Take Care of U"

== Awards and nominations ==
Award	Year	Category	Nominated work	Result
BET Comedy Awards	2004	Outstanding Lead Actor in a Comedy Series	One on One	Nominated
BET Comedy Awards	2005	Outstanding Lead Actor in a Comedy Series	One on One	Nominated
NAACP Image Awards	2003	Outstanding Actor in a Comedy Series	One on One	Nominated
NAACP Image Awards	2004	Outstanding Actor in a Comedy Series	One on One	Nominated
NAACP Image Awards	2005	Outstanding Actor in a Television Movie, Mini-Series or Dramatic Special	Man in the Mirror: The Michael Jackson Story	Nominated
NAACP Image Awards	2005	Outstanding Actor in a Comedy Series	One on One	Nominated
