= Anthony Johnson (actor) =

American actor and comedian (1966–2021)

- Born: February 1, 1966; Compton, California, U.S.
- Died: September 6, 2021 (aged 55); Los Angeles, California, U.S.
- Spouse: Lexis Jones Mason
- Children: 3

Comedy career
- Years active: 1982–2019
- Medium: Stand-up, film, television
- Genres: Comedy, observational comedy, satire, improvisational comedy, blue comedy

Anthony Johnson (February 1, 1966 – September 6, 2021), sometimes credited as A. J. Johnson, was an American actor and comedian. He was best known for his role as Ezal in the 1995 comedy film Friday.

== Career ==
Born in Compton, California, his father Eddie Smith was a stuntman and a co-founder of the Black Stuntmen's Association. Johnson had credited his father for helping him enter the film industry, by getting him to work in film productions. He had also credited the comedian Robin Harris for helping him earlier on in his career as a stand-up comedian and giving him another chance even when he was jeered for his bad performance.

Johnson began acting in his early twenties. In 1990, he landed a starring role as E.Z.E. in House Party, after which he started doing stand-up in bars in Los Angeles. He later appeared in Lethal Weapon 3 as a drug dealer and in Menace II Society. His biggest role was in the 1995 comedy Friday, as Ezal, a crackhead and thief. He also appeared in Panther, The Players Club, B*A*P*S, I Got the Hook-Up, Def Jam's How to Be a Player and Repos, and in rap videos: in Dr. Dre's "Dre Day" (1992), he played Sleazy-E, a parody of Eazy-E, and he appeared again as Sleazy-E in the video for Eazy-E's "Real Muthaphuckkin G's" (1993), this time being assaulted.

== Personal life ==
Johnson was married to Lexis Jones Mason, but divorced in 2004. Anthony had three daughters, Antionette, Natasha and Bijan Johnson.

In July 2009, it was reported that Johnson had a heart attack at LaGuardia Airport while on his way to a comedy show. However, Johnson said in 2018 that it was instead a panic attack.

Johnson died on September 6, 2021, aged 55, at a Los Angeles County hospital, after being found unresponsive in a store. His death was publicly announced on September 20 by his representative LyNea Bell. Johnson died of multi-system organ failure. It also stated that he had contracted COVID-19 but was asymptomatic.

== Filmography ==
=== Film ===
| Year | Title | Role | Notes |
|---|---|---|---|
| 1982 | Puss in Boots | Field Hands | TV movie |
| 1990 | House Party | E.Z.E. | |
| 1992 | Lethal Weapon 3 | Drug Dealer | |
| 1993 | Menace II Society | Tony | |
| 1994 | House Party 3 | Butcher | |
| 1995 | Panther | Tony/Sabu | |
| 1995 | Friday | Ezal | |
| 1996 | The Great White Hype | Sultan's Valet | |
| 1997 | B*A*P*S | James | |
| 1997 | How to Be a Player | Spootie | |
| 1997 | Hoover Park | Chris | |
| 1998 | The Players Club | L'il Man | |
| 1998 | Woo | Doorman | |
| 1998 | I Got the Hook-Up | Blue | |
| 1998 | Dark Angeles | Drug Dealer / Attorney | |
| 1999 | Rising to the Top | Jailer #2 | Video |
| 1999 | Foolish | Himself | Video |
| 2000 | Hot Boyz | Pee Wee | Video |
| 2000 | Baller Blockin' | Himself | |
| 2001 | O | Dell | |
| 2002 | On the Edge | Hank Conrad | |
| 2003 | Sweet Hideaway | Coach | |
| 2004 | Roscoe's House of Chicken n Waffles | Roscoe | Video |
| 2004 | Hittin' It! | Cousin E | |
| 2006 | Repos | Tick Tack | Video |
| 2015 | Office Staff | AJ | TV movie |
| 2016 | Undercover Princesses | Dolph Thomas | |
| 2017 | Candy | Lollipop | |
| 2018 | 5K1 | Wash Manager | |
| 2018 | Hey, Mr. Postman! | Cousin Tino | |
| 2018 | Consequencez | Detective | |
| 2019 | I Got The Hook Up 2 | Blue | |
| 2019 | The Dummy | O.G.B.C Hype Man | |
| 2019 | Shorty Betta Go 2 Work - Grandma Huttie's Boyfriend | Gold Grillz | Short |

=== Television ===
| Year | Title | Role | Notes |
|---|---|---|---|
| 1989 | The Bold and the Beautiful | Caterer #2 | Episode: "Episode #1.579" |
| 1993-97 | Martin | Clyde / LaFonne | 2 Episodes |
| 1994 | Def Comedy Jam | Himself | TV series |
| 1994 | South Central | Thug on the Bus | Episode: "Gun: Part 1" |
| 1995 | The Parent 'Hood | Tre | Episode: "Welcome Back, Robert" |
| 1996 | Moesha | G-Dog | Episode: "Niece" |
| 1997 | Malcolm & Eddie | Free Willie | 2 Episodes |
| 1997 | The Jamie Foxx Show | Lil Loc Dog | Episode: "Super Face Off" |
