= List of Scary Movie (film series) characters =

Scary Movie is a comedy film series that parodies films in the horror genre. Most of the films revolve around how Cindy Campbell and various other characters deal with the threats that arise in their lives that heavily mirror the ones seen in the films being parodied.

== Introduced in Scary Movie ==
=== Cindy Campbell ===
- Portrayed by Anna Faris

Cindy Campbell is the main character of the Scary Movie franchise. In the first film, Cindy is a ditzy brunette who is constantly eluding her sex-crazed boyfriend, Bobby Prinze, and has a drug dealer and addict father Neil. She becomes the killer's next target after Drew Decker, a classmate of Cindy's from B.A. Corpse High School, is murdered. After finally giving up her virginity to Bobby, he reveals himself as the killer. However, the real masked murderer shows up and engages in a martial arts fight with Cindy. Police start to interrogate Cindy after the fact to find the killer, and she realizes the clues point to her friend Buffy Gilmore's brother, Officer Doofy.

Cindy subsequently appears in the next three films in the franchise, going to college in the second film, becoming a news presenter in the third, and a health professional in the fourth. She is best friends with Brenda Meeks throughout the franchise. She is based on the final girls of various horror franchises, such as Sidney Prescott (Neve Campbell) from Scream and Julie James (Jennifer Love Hewitt) from I Know What You Did Last Summer. Her name is a play on the first name of Sidney Prescott, and her last name being taken from that of Neve Campbell. She is blonde in the third and fourth films. She is a parody of Nell Vance (Lili Taylor) from The Haunting in the second film, Rachel Keller (Naomi Watts) from The Ring in the third film, Karen Davis (Sarah Michelle Gellar) from The Grudge in the fourth film, and Laurie Strode (Jamie Lee Curtis) from Halloween (2018) and Morticia Addams (Catherine Zeta-Jones) from Wednesday in the sixth film.

=== Brenda Meeks ===
- Portrayed by Regina Hall

Brenda Meeks is the other main character in the Scary Movie franchise. Brenda is Shorty's sister and Cindy's best friend. Brenda was also dating Ray Wilkins, despite the fact that he is interested in men. She gets stabbed in a movie theater by theatergoers due to being obnoxious and annoying during the showing of Shakespeare in Love.

In the second film, Brenda is alive by unexplained means, and is attending college with Cindy. In the third film, she is an elementary school teacher but is killed by the ghost Tabitha. She returns in the fourth film again by unknown means. She is based on Maureen Evans (Jada Pinkett) from Scream 2 and Karla Wilson (Brandy) from I Still Know What You Did Last Summer, while her name Meeks is a reference to Martha Meeks from Scream 3 (2000). In the sixth film, she is based on Sue Ann Erlington from Ma.

=== Shorty Meeks ===
- Portrayed by Marlon Wayans

Shorty Meeks is Brenda's brother, and he is constantly smoking marijuana with his friends. Shorty is shot by Bobby in front of Cindy near the end of film. Shorty returns by unknown means in the second film. The character is based on Randy Meeks (Jamie Kennedy) from Scream and Titus Telesco (Jack Black) from I Still Know What You Did Last Summer, with his last name coming from the former.

He returns in the sixth film, still in High School due to being held back for many years. He is now a crypto investor and live streamer.

=== Ray Wilkins ===
- Portrayed by Shawn Wayans

Ray Wilkins is a closeted football player at B.A. Corpse High School. Although he dates Brenda, he partakes in many homosexual activities, including a hidden relationship with Bobby, which he denies. Ray was apparently killed in the movie theater restroom. He is revealed to be alive in the end, where he teams up with Bobby to pretend to be the killer but ends up getting injured by the actual killer.

Ray returns in the second film, going to college with Cindy, Brenda and Shorty, and continuing his relationship with Brenda. He is based on Stu Macher (Matthew Lillard) from Scream, Tyrell Martin (Mekhi Phifer) from I Still Know What You Did Last Summer and Phil Stevens (Omar Epps) from Scream 2. He also returns in the sixth film, renouncing his homosexual activities in church.

=== Bobby Prinze ===
- Portrayed by Jon Abrahams

Bobby Prinze is Cindy's boyfriend and a fellow student at B.A. Corpse High School. Bobby was arrested once for suspicion of being the killer, but he was let go once the killer was spotted when he was in jail. Bobby, later, fakes being attacked by the killer. He is then found alive and admits that he and Ray have been the ones killing their friends. Bobby also admits that he has been having a love affair with Ray, and that they abducted Cindy's father Neil. When the actual killer shows up, he kills both Bobby and Ray. Bobby is based on Billy Loomis (Skeet Ulrich) from Scream and Ray Bronson (Freddie Prinze Jr.) from I Know What You Did Last Summer.

He returns in the sixth film as a hallucination of Cindy in a hospital, based on Smile and it is revealed that he is Sara's father.

=== Greg Phillippe ===
- Portrayed by Lochlyn Munro

Greg Phillippe is Buffy's brutish, unintelligent boyfriend, and he was the one that forcibly swore everyone to secrecy after murdering a pedestrian. He is killed at Buffy's pageant. Greg is based on Barry Cox (Ryan Phillippe) (I Know What You Did Last Summer).

Greg returns in the sixth film as the town sheriff and having a son, being based on Judy Hicks in Scream (2022).

=== Buffy Gilmore ===
- Portrayed by Shannon Elizabeth

Buffy Gilmore is Greg's girlfriend and is a promiscuous, rich girl. Buffy is the sister of Officer Doofy and claims to be Cindy's best friend. She is also very sarcastic when it comes to confronting the killer in true horror spoof movie fashion. Buffy is based on the character Helen Shivers (I Know What You Did Last Summer) and her name comes from Buffy Summers (Buffy the Vampire Slayer), both portrayed by Sarah Michelle Gellar. She is also partially based on Tatum Riley (Rose McGowan) from Scream.

Marlon and Shawn Wayans had intended for Elizabeth to return as Buffy Gilmore in 2026's Scary Movie, but had to exclude her and the character due to the already large number of returning cast members. They have expressed interest in having her return as Gilmore for a future installment.

=== Gail Hailstorm ===
- Portrayed by Cheri Oteri

Gail Hailstorm is a pushy television reporter who will do anything to get information, including flirting with Officer Doofy in order to get a lead on the brutal killings. She is also the author of a book titled You're Dead, I'm Rich. Gail is based on the character Gale Weathers (Courteney Cox) from Scream. She returns in the sixth film, still reporting on the latest news related to murders in the area. She is killed off when the killer breaks into her surgery room and injects her with a deadly serum.

=== Doofy Gilmore ===
- Portrayed by Dave Sheridan

Doofy Gilmore, or Officer Doofy, is Buffy's brother and is portrayed to be a very unintelligent rookie police officer. At the end of the movie, when Cindy finds out he is the killer, he is tearing off his disguise and ends up getting away in a car with Gail Hailstorm. He is a parody of Dewey Riley (David Arquette) from the Scream franchise.

In the sixth film, Doofy has quit the police force and secluded himself from society for many years, up to where he believes the COVID-19 pandemic remains an active threat. He still appears unintelligent (despite the ending of the first film) and comes out of retirement to help Cindy's friends and their children hunt down the killer. It also revealed that he went to trial for the murders he committed in the first film, but was pardoned.

=== Other ===
Other characters in Scary Movie include Cindy's drug dealing father Neil Campbell (Rick Ducommun) based on Neil Prescott (Lawrence Hecht) from Scream, Gail's cameraman Kenny (Dan Joffre) based on Kenny (W. Earl Brown) from Scream, the killer's first victim Drew Decker (Carmen Electra) based on Casey Becker (Drew Barrymore) from Scream, Shorty's stoner friends, and other classmates, school staff, and police officers.

== Introduced in Scary Movie 2 ==
=== Buddy Sanderson ===
- Portrayed by Chris Masterson

Buddy Sanderson is a college student and friend of the gang, sharing a room with Ray. He is selected for the paranormal experiment alongside the other student. After initially being rejected romantically by Cindy, he treats her as he would his male friends, roughhousing and teasing her. Later in the film, they become intimate when trapped in a walk-in freezer. He is dating Cindy at the end of the film. He is a parody of Luke Sanderson (Owen Wilson) from The Haunting.

=== Alex Monday ===
- Portrayed by Tori Spelling

Alex Monday is a classmate of the gang in college. She is selected for the paranormal experiment. During the night, the ghost of Hugh Kane has sex with her, to which she becomes infatuated with him to his dismay. She dies when Kane drops a chandelier on her. Her name comes from Alex Munday (Lucy Liu) from Charlie's Angels. Her character is partially a parody of Nell Vance (Lili Taylor) from The Haunting (1999).

=== Theo Keyoko ===
- Portrayed by Kathleen Robertson

Theo Keyoko is an attractive classmate of the gang in college. She is selected for the paranormal experiment. She attempts to use sex to bribe Dwight Hartman but he refuses. She joins Cindy and Brenda in forming a Charlies Angels style group to defeat a possessed Hanson. She is based on Theodora (Catherine Zeta-Jones) from The Haunting.

=== Dwight Hartman ===
- Portrayed by David Cross

Dwight is a wheelchair-using scientist working with Professor Oldman to study paranormal activity at Kane Manor. He organizes a study in which the gang comes to the house under the guise of a sleep disorder study. He has a rivalry with Hanson. He falls out of a window after a battle with the ghost of Hugh Kane, but survived. He is quite adamant about doing things for himself despite his disability, often clumsily doing things and wearing clothes associated with using legs, such as roller skates and jogging suits. He is most likely based of paraplegic characters in various horror films, such as Will Stanton (A Nightmare On Elm Street 3: Dream Warriors), and Franklin Hardesty (The Texas Cahinsaw Massacre).

=== Hanson ===
- Portrayed by Chris Elliott

Hanson is the butler and caretaker at Kane Manor. He has a malformed left hand which leaves other characters disgusted, but he describes as being his "strong hand". He was hired by Hugh Kane, but went on to kill him and his mistress after falling in love with Kane's wife, Caroline. He continued to work as a caretaker during Oldman's occupation of the house and the experiments. He was possessed by Hugh Kane, and almost died when the ghost was expelled. He reappeared at the college campus to claim Cindy, but was struck by a car driven by Shorty and killed. Hanson is based on Mr. Dudley (Bruce Dern) from The Haunting, as well as Reverend Henry Kane from “Poltergeist II: The Other Side”.

=== Professor Oldman ===
- Portrayed by (Tim Curry)

Oldman is a college professor hosting the characters in the haunted house, being based on characters from The Haunting and its remake. He uses the students to act as subjects for the paranormal forces of the house, under the guise of a sleep disorder experiment. He is perverse, often making suggestive comments and stalking the female characters. He is a parody of Dr. David Marrow (Liam Neeson) from The Haunting.

=== Father McFeely ===
- Portrayed by (James Woods)

Father McFeely is a local priest who arrived to the Vorhees house upon being told that their daughter Megan was possessed. He is a parody of Lankester Merrin from The Exorcist.

In an alternate ending to Scary Movie 2, Father McFeely would have visited the Hell House with law enforcement to inform Cindy that she's the soul survivor of all the people who stayed in the house and that all her friends are dead.

=== Other ===
Characters in the opening include Megan Vorhees (Natasha Lyonne), her mother (Veronica Cartwright) and the priest Father Harris (Andy Richter), who act as parodies of The Exorcist characters, Regan MacNeil (Linda Blair), Chris MacNeil (Ellen Burstyn) and Father Damien Karras (Jason Miller) respectively.

The ghost of Hugh Kane (Richard Moll), a parody of Hugh Crain (Charles Gunning) from The Haunting, serves as the main antagonist of the film. The ghost of his mistress Victoria Crane (Jennifer Curran), a parody of Madison Elizabeth Frank (Amber Valletta) from What Lies Beneath, starts a sexual relationship with Shorty. Caroline Kane (Anna Faris) is married to Hugh Kane, who bears a striking resemblance to Cindy. She acts as a guiding spirit to Cindy throughout the film and is a parody of Carolyn Crain (Hadley Eure) from The Haunting. Mr. Kittles is a violent black cat and Polly is a foul-mouthed green parrot, and are both residents of the mansion.

== Introduced in Scary Movie 3 ==
=== Cody Campbell ===
- Portrayed by Drew Mikuska

Cody Campbell is Cindy's nephew. His mother died after his birth and he was left in Cindy's care. His teacher in school was Brenda and he was friends with Sue Logan. He has some psychic powers, including clairvoyancy. In Scary Movie 4, Cindy tells Tom Logan that he was sent to military school. Cody is based on Aidan Keller (David Dorfman) from The Ring and Morgan Hess (Rory Culkin) from Signs.

=== Tom Logan ===
- Portrayed by Charlie Sheen

Tom Logan was a former pastor and farmer who lived with his daughter Sue and brother George. His wife Annie (Denise Richards) died in a car accident prior to the film, which made him give up church. Tom and George discover alien activity on their farm, as well as having to face a ghost named Tabitha. He officiates the marriage of Cindy and George in the film's conclusion. In Scary Movie 4, Tom is depressed living in New York and attempts to kill himself, but the process is ruined by Cindy, who makes him overdose on Viagra and impale himself on his own penis. Tom is based on Graham Hess (Mel Gibson) from Signs and Peter Kirk (Bill Pullman) from The Grudge. Sheen also portrayed Charlie Sanders in Scary Movie 5.

=== George Logan ===
- Portrayed by Simon Rex

George Logan was an aspiring rap artist living with his brother Tom and his niece Sue on their farm. He is quite clumsy and unaware, accidentally making racist symbols and hurting Cody throughout the film. He marries Cindy at the end of the film. In Scary Movie 4, George is shown to have died by tripping on a stool at Cindy's boxing match, in a scene similar to Million Dollar Baby. George is based on Merrill Hess (Joaquin Phoenix) from Signs, Jimmy "B-Rabbit" Smith (Eminem) from 8 Mile and Noah Clay (Martin Henderson) from The Ring. Rex also portrayed Dan Sanders in Scary Movie 5.

=== Baxter Harris ===
- Portrayed by Leslie Nielsen

Baxter Harris is the incompetent president of the United States. He ends up knocking Tabitha back into her well, defeating her. He is still acting president in Scary Movie 4. He is a parody of President George W. Bush.

=== Mahalik and CJ ===
- Portrayed by Anthony Anderson and Kevin Hart

Mahalik and CJ are friends of George Logan. In Scary Movie 4, they are shown to also be friends of Tom Ryan. They are parodies of David "Future" Porter (Mekhi Phifer) and DJ Iz (De'Angelo Wilson) from 8 Mile.

Anderson also appears in the sixth film as himself.

=== Trooper Champlin ===
- Portrayed Camryn Manheim

Trooper Champlin is the local state police officer near Washington D.C, and an acquaintance of Tom Logan. She informs him of the details of his wife’s death. Years later, she continues to console him about the incident. She is a parody of Officer Paski (Cherry Jones) from Signs.

=== Other ===
Sue Logan (Jianna Ballard) is the daughter of Tom Logan, parodying Bo Hess (Abigail Breslin) from Signs. Tabitha (Marny Eng) is the spirit of a demonic girl, parodying Samara Morgan (Daveigh Chase) from The Ring, who serves as the main antagonist, alongside aliens and Michael Jackson (Edward Moss). Parodies of The Matrix characters Oracle (Queen Latifah), Morpheus (Eddie Griffin) and the Architect (George Carlin), originally portrayed by Gloria Foster, Lawrence Fishburne and Helmut Bakaitis respectively, are also in the film.

== Introduced in Scary Movie 4 ==
=== Tom Ryan ===
- Portrayed by Craig Bierko

Tom Ryan (also known as Horace P. McTitties as per a court order name change by his wife Marilyn) is a dock worker in New York City and the neighbor of Mrs. Norris, an elderly woman Cindy Campbell acts as the care worker for. He is divorced with two children, Robbie and Rachel. When alien tripods arrive, he flees with his children. He is abducted with Rachel but is later saved by Cindy. He begins a romantic relationship with Cindy at the end of the film. Tom is based on Ray Ferrier (Tom Cruise), from War of the Worlds.

=== Others ===
Robbie and Rachel Ryan (Beau Mirchoff and Conchita Campbell) are Tom's children and parodies of Robbie and Rachel Farrier (Justin Chatwin and Dakota Fanning) from War of the Worlds. His ex-wife Marilyn (Molly Shannon) is a parody of Mary Ann Ferrier (Miranda Otto) from War of the Worlds. Mrs. Norris (Cloris Leachman), a parody of Emma Williams (Grace Zabriskie) from The Grudge, is an elderly woman cared for by Cindy, under the management of Mr. Koji (Henry Mah), a parody of Alex (Ted Raimi) from The Grudge. Toshi Saeki (Garret Masuda) is the ghost of a young Japanese boy haunting Mrs. Norris' home after his and his mother Kayako (Tomoko Sato)'s death at Cindy's boxing match. They are parodies of Toshio Saeki (Yuya Ozaki) and Kayako Saeki (Takako Fuji) from The Grudge. Zoltar (David Zucker) and Billy (Craig Mazin) are brother Martians who resemble Billy the Puppet who hold Saw-esque torture rooms as well as lead the alien invasion. There are also characters living an Amish style life in a parody of The Village.

== Introduced in Scary Movie 5 ==
=== Sanders Flamily ===
==== Jody Sanders ====
- Portrayed by Ashley Tisdale

Jody Sanders is a musician, ballet dancer and the wife of Dan Sanders. She becomes the adoptive mother of Dan's nieces and nephews. She is haunted by the spirit, Mama, but eventually defeats it. Jody is a parody of Katie Featherston from Paranormal Activity, Nina Sayers (Natalie Portman) from Black Swan and Annabel (Jessica Chastain) from Mama.

==== Dan Sanders ====
- Portrayed by Simon Rex

Dan Sanders is the husband of Jody, the brother of Charlie (Charlie Sheen), and the uncle to Kathy, Lily, and Aidan. He is a parody of Micah Sloat from Paranormal Activity and Lucas Desange (Nikolaj Coster-Waldau) from Mama

==== Kathy, Lily, and Aidan Sanders ====
- Portrayed by Gracie Whitton, Ava Kolker, and Dylan and Ryan Morris

Kathy, Lily and Aidan are the children of Charlie Sanders, and nieces and nephew of Dan. They are parodies of Victoria Desange (Megan Charpentier) and Megan Desange (Isabelle Nélisse) from Mama and Hunter Rey (Jackson Xenia Prieto and William Juan Prieto) from Paranormal Activity 2.

=== Other ===
Kendra Brooks (Erica Ash) is a fellow ballet dancer to Jody and a parody of Lily (Mila Kunis) from Black Swan. Maria (Lidia Porto) is the housekeeper to the Sanders family and a parody of Martine (Vivis Cortez) from Paranormal Activity 2. Mama (Donna Harrison and Scott Nery) is the main antagonist of Scary Movie 5 and a parody of the titular antagonist (Javier Botet) of Mama.

== Introduced in Scary Movie (2026) ==
=== Sara Campbell ===
- Portrayed by Olivia Rose Keegan, Hattie M. Baker (young)

Sara Campbell is the daughter of Cindy Campbell and Bobby Prinze, and Tuesday's older half-sister. Sara is addicted to drugs and has been estranged from her mother for six years because of Cindy constantly worried about Ghostface's return. As a child, Sara was neglected by Cindy and was gifted a severed arm by Scarifier, a parody of Art the Clown of the Terrifier franchise. Sara's boyfriend is Jack Kirsch, who she works with in an amusement park inspired by the Final Destination franchise. After Tuesday's attack by Ghostface, she and Jack are forced to reunite with her mother Cindy. After narrowly saving Tuesday with Jack, Sara infiltrates the Meeks' home where they discover the killers' identities, including Jack. After Shorty and Ray decide to cease their killing spree, Sara and Tuesday present themselves as the new leading ladies of the franchise, unintentionally insulting the original characters. Cindy and the others tie up Sara and Tuesday and leave them to burn inside the Meeks' home. Sara is based on Samantha Carpenter (Melissa Barrera) from Scream (2022). Other influences include Karen Nelson (Judy Greer) from Halloween (2018) and Joan (Lola Kirke) from Sinners.

=== Tuesday Campbell ===
- Portrayed by Savannah Lee Nassif

Tuesday Campbell is Cindy's younger daughter and Sara's younger half-sister. She was attacked by Ghostface while home alone, in order to force Sarah return to Woodsville and lure her mother out of the house. Tuesday is based on Tara Carpenter (Scream (2022)) and named after Wednesday Addams (Wednesday), both portrayed by Jenna Ortega.

=== Jack Kirsch ===
- Portrayed by Cameron Scott Roberts

Jack Kirsch is Sara's boyfriend. Jack is based on Richie Kirsch (Jack Quaid) from Scream (2022) and Remmick (Jack O'Connell) from Sinners. He is named after both Quaid and O'Connell.

=== Brad Meeks ===
- Portrayed by Gregg Wayans

Brad Meeks is Brenda and Ray's son and Dei's twin. Brad is based on Chad Meeks-Martin (Mason Gooding) from Scream (2022).

=== Dei Meeks ===
- Portrayed by Sydney Park

Dei Meeks is Brenda and Ray's daughter and Brad's twin. Dei is based on Mindy Meeks-Martin (Jasmin Savoy Brown) from Scream (2022).

=== Jess Phillippe ===
- Portrayed by Benny Zielke

Jess Phillippe is Greg's transgender son. Jess is based on Wes Hicks (Dylan Minnette) from Scream (2022).

=== Elle McKenzie ===
- Portrayed by Ruby Snowber

Elle McKenzie is Brad's girlfriend. Elle is based on Amber Freeman (Mikey Madison) and Liv McKenzie (Sonia Ammar) from Scream (2022).

=== Others ===
Agents Berger and Underwood (Heidi Gardner and Damon Wayans Jr.) and Shorthand (Chris Elliott) are parodies of Lee Harker (Maika Monroe), William Carter (Blair Underwood) and Longlegs (Nicolas Cage) from Longlegs respectively. Kim Wayans plays Nurse Ratchett.

Kenan Thompson appears as Jermaine Jackson, referencing his brother Michael Jackson's film Michael. As themselves appear Teyana Taylor and Carmen Electra, the latter working as a bartender, as well as Anthony Anderson and Shaquille O'Neal.
