= List of film franchises with LGBTQ characters =

The following is a list of film franchises with fictional and factual lesbian, gay, bisexual, transgender, or queer characters (LGBTQ) in a leading or supporting role (including guest characters). The films were released theatrically, direct-to-video, or on a streaming platform (not made-for-TV). Film franchises, as well as sequels and prequels, share common universes.

== Film franchises ==
Franchise	Year	Title	Character(s)	Identity	Actor	Notes	Country	Ref(s)
Alien	1979	Alien	Joan Lambert	Trans woman	Veronica Cartwright	In the sequel Aliens (1986) a biography very briefly flashes up on a computer screen in the background. The biography establishes Lambert as having had her gender altered from male to female. On the extras of a DVD presentation, one could see Lambert's full bio, which reads: "Despin Convert at birth (male to female). So far no indication of suppressed traumas related to gender alteration".	United States	
Alien	2017	Alien: Covenant	Dan Lope	Gay	Demián Bichir	Sergeant Lope is the head of the security unit aboard the Covenant and Sergeant Hallett's husband.	United Kingdom, United States	
Alien	2017	Alien: Covenant	Hallett	Gay	Nathaniel Dean	Sergeant Lope is the head of the security unit aboard the Covenant and Sergeant Hallett's husband.	United Kingdom, United States	
Austin Powers	1997	Austin Powers: International Man of Mystery	Frau Greta Farbissina	Bisexual	Mindy Sterling	Greta has a girlfriend named Una Brau in the second film who she met on the LPGA tour and fell in love. Later, when Dr. Evil and Past Greta have sex, she comments that she'll never love another man. Dr. Evil remembers her, responding "Yes, that's true". The sex between Dr. Evil and Greta results in their "love child", Scott.	United States	
Austin Powers	1999	Austin Powers: The Spy Who Shagged Me	Frau Greta Farbissina	Bisexual	Mindy Sterling	Greta has a girlfriend named Una Brau in the second film who she met on the LPGA tour and fell in love. Later, when Dr. Evil and Past Greta have sex, she comments that she'll never love another man. Dr. Evil remembers her, responding "Yes, that's true". The sex between Dr. Evil and Greta results in their "love child", Scott.	United States	
Austin Powers	2002	Austin Powers in Goldmember	Frau Greta Farbissina	Bisexual	Mindy Sterling	Greta has a girlfriend named Una Brau in the second film who she met on the LPGA tour and fell in love. Later, when Dr. Evil and Past Greta have sex, she comments that she'll never love another man. Dr. Evil remembers her, responding "Yes, that's true". The sex between Dr. Evil and Greta results in their "love child", Scott.	United States	
Basic Instinct	1992	Basic Instinct	Roxy Hardy	Lesbian	Leilani Sarelle	Roxy is Tramell's lover who tries to kill Nick Curran	United States	
Basic Instinct	1992	Basic Instinct	Catherine Tramell	Bisexual	Sharon Stone	Tramell is a psychopathic novelist who has sexual relationships with both male and female characters.	United States	
Basic Instinct	2006	Basic Instinct 2	Catherine Tramell	Bisexual	Sharon Stone	The same character from the 1992 film.	United States	
Bridget Jones	2001	Bridget Jones's Diary	Tom	Gay	James Callis	Tom is Bridget's flamboyant 'gay best friend'.	France, Ireland, United Kingdom, United States	
Bridget Jones	2004	Bridget Jones: The Edge of Reason	Tom	Gay	James Callis	Tom is Bridget's flamboyant 'gay best friend'.	France, Ireland, United Kingdom, United States	
Bridget Jones	2004	Bridget Jones: The Edge of Reason	Rebecca Gillies	Lesbian	Jacinda Barrett	Rebecca is Mark Darcy's colleague who Bridget thinks is enamoured with him; it turns out her affections lie with Bridget.	France, Ireland, United Kingdom, United States	
Bridget Jones	2016	Bridget Jones's Baby	Tom	Gay	James Callis	The same character from the 2001 and 2004 films.	France, United Kingdom, United States	
Bridget Jones	2025	Bridget Jones: Mad About the Boy	Tom	Gay	James Callis	The same character from the 2001 and 2004 films.	France, United Kingdom, United States	
Bullyparade	2001	Der Schuh des Manitu	Winnetouch	Gay	Michael Herbig	Older twin brother of the Apache chief Abahachi.	Germany	
Bullyparade	2004	Traumschiff Surprise – Periode 1	Captain Jürgen T. Kork	Gay	Christian Tramitz	Parodies of Star Trek characters Captain James T. Kirk, Scotty, and Mr. Spock. Spoof and characters originate from the television show Bullyparade.	Germany	
Bullyparade	2004	Traumschiff Surprise – Periode 1	Schrotty	Gay	Rick Kavanian	Parodies of Star Trek characters Captain James T. Kirk, Scotty, and Mr. Spock. Spoof and characters originate from the television show Bullyparade.	Germany	
Bullyparade	2004	Traumschiff Surprise – Periode 1	Mr. Brigitte "Spucki" Spuck	Gay	Michael Herbig	Parodies of Star Trek characters Captain James T. Kirk, Scotty, and Mr. Spock. Spoof and characters originate from the television show Bullyparade.	Germany	
Bullyparade	2017	Bullyparade: The Movie	Captain Jürgen T. Kork	Gay	Christian Tramitz	Parodies of Star Trek characters Captain James T. Kirk, Scotty, and Mr. Spock. Spoof and characters originate from the television show Bullyparade.	Germany	
Bullyparade	2017	Bullyparade: The Movie	Schrotty	Gay	Rick Kavanian	Parodies of Star Trek characters Captain James T. Kirk, Scotty, and Mr. Spock. Spoof and characters originate from the television show Bullyparade.	Germany	
Bullyparade	2017	Bullyparade: The Movie	Mr. Brigitte "Spucki" Spuck	Gay	Michael Herbig	Parodies of Star Trek characters Captain James T. Kirk, Scotty, and Mr. Spock. Spoof and characters originate from the television show Bullyparade.	Germany	
Bullyparade	2025	Das Kanu des Manitu	Winnetouch	Gay	Michael Herbig	The same character from the 2001 film.	Germany	
Child's Play	1998	Bride of Chucky	David	Gay	Gordon Michael Woolvett	He has an unnamed ex-boyfriend.	United States	
Child's Play	2004	Seed of Chucky	Glen / Glenda	Genderfluid	Billy Boyd	Although Glen / Glenda was not explicitly identified as genderfluid in the movie, their genderfluid identity was confirmed in the Chucky TV series.	United States	
Child's Play	2013	Curse of Chucky	Jill	Lesbian	Maitland McConnell	The live-in nanny of Alice, she has an affair with Barb, who is Alice's mother, making out with her in the kitchen.	United States	
Child's Play	2017	Cult of Chucky	Carlos	Gay	Zak Santiago	A male nurse who shares details about his husband's disability.	United States	
Cleopatra Jones	1973	Cleopatra Jones	Mommy	Lesbian	Shelley Winters	Mommy is a gang leader who exhibits predatory behavior towards the women she keeps around for her pleasure.	United States	
Cleopatra Jones	1975	Cleopatra Jones and the Casino of Gold	Dragon Lady	Lesbian	Stella Stevens	Dragon Lady is a lesbian drug lord based in Hong Kong.	United States	
2020	Justice League Dark: Apokolips War	John Constantine	Bisexual	Matt Ryan	Matt Ryan confirmed in an interview that they are ex-boyfriends.			
2020	Justice League Dark: Apokolips War	King Shark	Gay or Bisexual	John DiMaggio	Matt Ryan confirmed in an interview that they are ex-boyfriends.			
DC Extended Universe	2020	Birds of Prey	Harley Quinn	Bisexual	Margot Robbie	In the opening 10 minutes, Harley says she is unlucky in love, which is represented by an animated sequence showing two of her previous partners as men and one as a woman.	United States	
DC Extended Universe	2020	Birds of Prey	Renee Montoya	Lesbian	Rosie Perez	Renée and Ellen are exes.	United States	
DC Extended Universe	2020	Birds of Prey	Ellen Yee	Lesbian	Ali Wong	Renée and Ellen are exes.	United States	
DC Extended Universe	2021	The Suicide Squad	Harley Quinn	Bisexual	Margot Robbie	Same character from the 2020 film.	United States	
DC Extended Universe	2023	Shazam! Fury of the Gods	Pedro Peña	Gay	Jovan Armand	In one scene, Pedro comes out to his foster family as gay.	United States	
DC Extended Universe	2023	Shazam! Fury of the Gods	Pedro Peña	Gay	D. J. Cotrona	In one scene, Pedro comes out to his foster family as gay.	United States	
The Devil Wears Prada	2006	The Devil Wears Prada	Nigel Kipling	Gay	Stanley Tucci	Nigel is Runway Magazine's art director.	United States	
The Devil Wears Prada	2026	The Devil Wears Prada 2	Nigel Kipling	Gay	Stanley Tucci	Nigel is Runway Magazine's art director.	United States	
Die wilden Hühner	2006	Die wilden Hühner	Wilma	Lesbian	Jette Hering	Wilma is a student whose relationship with Leonie leads to an argument in her friend group.	Germany	
Die wilden Hühner	2007	Die wilden Hühner und die Liebe	Wilma	Lesbian	Jette Hering	Wilma is a student whose relationship with Leonie leads to an argument in her friend group.	Germany	
Die wilden Hühner	2009	Die wilden Hühner und das Leben	Wilma	Lesbian	Jette Hering	Wilma is a student whose relationship with Leonie leads to an argument in her friend group.	Germany	
Die wilden Hühner	2007	Die wilden Hühner und die Liebe	Leonie	Lesbian	Svea Bein	Leonie is Wilma's girlfriend until they separate at the end of the second film.	Germany	
Downton Abbey	2019	Downton Abbey	Thomas Barrow	Gay	Robert James-Collier	Based on the tv series of the same name, Barrow is the former butler at Downton Abbey, who is currently the assistant and lover of actor Guy Dexter.	United Kingdom, United States	
Downton Abbey	2022	Downton Abbey: A New Era	Thomas Barrow	Gay	Robert James-Collier	Based on the tv series of the same name, Barrow is the former butler at Downton Abbey, who is currently the assistant and lover of actor Guy Dexter.	United Kingdom, United States	
Downton Abbey	2022	Downton Abbey: A New Era	Guy Dexter	Gay	Dominic West	Based on the tv series of the same name, Barrow is the former butler at Downton Abbey, who is currently the assistant and lover of actor Guy Dexter.	United Kingdom, United States	
Downton Abbey	2025	Downton Abbey: The Grand Finale	Thomas Barrow	Gay	Robert James-Collier	Based on the tv series of the same name, Barrow is the former butler at Downton Abbey, who is currently the assistant and lover of actor Guy Dexter.	United Kingdom, United States	
Downton Abbey	2025	Downton Abbey: The Grand Finale	Guy Dexter	Gay	Dominic West	Based on the tv series of the same name, Barrow is the former butler at Downton Abbey, who is currently the assistant and lover of actor Guy Dexter.	United Kingdom, United States	
Fear Street	2021	Fear Street Part One: 1994	Deena Johnson	Lesbian	Kiana Madeira	Deena and Sam once were in a relationship that broke apart when Sam and her mother moved to the rival neighbouring town where Sam began to date a boy named Peter. At the end of the first film, the two girls reunite and revive their relationship	United States	
Fear Street	2021	Fear Street Part One: 1994	Samantha "Sam" Fraser	Bisexual	Olivia Scott Welch	Deena and Sam once were in a relationship that broke apart when Sam and her mother moved to the rival neighbouring town where Sam began to date a boy named Peter. At the end of the first film, the two girls reunite and revive their relationship	United States	
Fear Street	2021	Fear Street Part Two: 1978	Deena Johnson	Lesbian	Kiana Madeira	Deena and Sam once were in a relationship that broke apart when Sam and her mother moved to the rival neighbouring town where Sam began to date a boy named Peter. At the end of the first film, the two girls reunite and revive their relationship	United States	
Fear Street	2021	Fear Street Part Two: 1978	Samantha "Sam" Fraser	Bisexual	Olivia Scott Welch	Deena and Sam once were in a relationship that broke apart when Sam and her mother moved to the rival neighbouring town where Sam began to date a boy named Peter. At the end of the first film, the two girls reunite and revive their relationship	United States	
Fear Street	2021	Fear Street Part Three: 1666	Deena Johnson	Lesbian	Kiana Madeira	Deena and Sam once were in a relationship that broke apart when Sam and her mother moved to the rival neighbouring town where Sam began to date a boy named Peter. At the end of the first film, the two girls reunite and revive their relationship	United States	
Fear Street	2021	Fear Street Part Three: 1666	Samantha "Sam" Fraser	Bisexual	Olivia Scott Welch	Deena and Sam once were in a relationship that broke apart when Sam and her mother moved to the rival neighbouring town where Sam began to date a boy named Peter. At the end of the first film, the two girls reunite and revive their relationship	United States	
Fear Street	2021	Fear Street Part Three: 1666	Sarah Fier	Lesbian	Kiana Madeira / Elizabeth Scopel	The two girls have a secret lesbian relationship. When this is discovered by their Christian community and strange events begin to occur, they are framed and hunted as witches, until Sarah is hanged.	United States	
Fear Street	2021	Fear Street Part Three: 1666	Hannah Miller	Lesbian	Olivia Scott Welch	The two girls have a secret lesbian relationship. When this is discovered by their Christian community and strange events begin to occur, they are framed and hunted as witches, until Sarah is hanged.	United States	
The Hangover	2009	The Hangover	Leslie Chow	Bisexual	Ken Jeong	The main antagonist in two films. In The Hangover he mentions his bisexuality. (GLAAD criticized the character as stereotypical.)	United States	
The Hangover	2011	The Hangover Part II	Leslie Chow	Bisexual	Ken Jeong	The main antagonist in two films. In The Hangover he mentions his bisexuality. (GLAAD criticized the character as stereotypical.)	United States	
The Hangover	2011	The Hangover Part II	Kimberly "Kimmy"	Trans woman	Yasmin Lee	A beautiful stripper and sex worker who Stu falls for.	United States	
The Hangover	2013	The Hangover Part III	Leslie Chow	Bisexual	Ken Jeong	Chow escapes from a prison in Thailand and is a major presence with a parade of hookers, as he remains sex-obsessed.	United States	
It	2017	It	Richie Tozier	Gay	Finn Wolfhard (young); Bill Hader (adult)	It is revealed that when Richie was younger, he struggled with his sexuality and feelings for his best friend Eddie Kaspbrak, and was bullied for it. When he returns to Derry 27 years later, we find out Richie had been in love with Eddie, who dies, which devastates Richie, but leads him to accept who he is and re-carve his and Eddie's initials on the kissing bridge that he had carved when he was 13.	United States	
It	2019	It Chapter Two	Richie Tozier	Gay	Finn Wolfhard (young); Bill Hader (adult)	It is revealed that when Richie was younger, he struggled with his sexuality and feelings for his best friend Eddie Kaspbrak, and was bullied for it. When he returns to Derry 27 years later, we find out Richie had been in love with Eddie, who dies, which devastates Richie, but leads him to accept who he is and re-carve his and Eddie's initials on the kissing bridge that he had carved when he was 13.	United States	
James Bond	1971	Diamonds Are Forever	Mr. Kidd	Gay	Bruce Glover	Wint and Kidd are hit men who work for Ernst Stavro Blofeld.	United Kingdom	
James Bond	1971	Diamonds Are Forever	Mr. Wint	Gay	Putter Smith	Wint and Kidd are hit men who work for Ernst Stavro Blofeld.	United Kingdom	
James Bond	2012	Skyfall	Q	Gay	Ben Whishaw	When James Bond and Moneypenny arrive at Q's house in No Time to Die, Q is setting up a date for himself and another man.	United Kingdom, United States	
James Bond	2015	Spectre	Q	Gay	Ben Whishaw	When James Bond and Moneypenny arrive at Q's house in No Time to Die, Q is setting up a date for himself and another man.	United Kingdom, United States	
James Bond	2021	No Time to Die	Q	Gay	Ben Whishaw	When James Bond and Moneypenny arrive at Q's house in No Time to Die, Q is setting up a date for himself and another man.	United Kingdom, United States	
Knives Out	2019	Knives Out	Benoit Blanc	Gay	Daniel Craig	Blanc is a master detective who has a domestic partner named Philip.	United States	
Knives Out	2022	Glass Onion: A Knives Out Mystery	Benoit Blanc	Gay	Daniel Craig	Blanc is a master detective who has a domestic partner named Philip.	United States	
Knives Out	2022	Glass Onion: A Knives Out Mystery	Philip	Gay	Hugh Grant	Blanc is a master detective who has a domestic partner named Philip.	United States	
Knives Out	2025	Wake Up Dead Man	Benoit Blanc	Gay	Daniel Craig	Blanc is a master detective who has a domestic partner named Philip.	United States	
Mamma Mia!	2008	Mamma Mia!	Harry Bright	Gay	Colin Firth	One of Sophie's possible fathers who is seen hugging and dancing with another man at the end of the first film.	Germany, United Kingdom, United States	
Mamma Mia!	2018	Mamma Mia! Here We Go Again	Harry Bright	Gay	Colin Firth	One of Sophie's possible fathers who is seen hugging and dancing with another man at the end of the first film.	United Kingdom, United States	
Mannequin	1987	Mannequin	Hollywood Montrose	Gay	Meshach Taylor	A flamboyant black man.	United States	
Mannequin	1991	Mannequin Two: On the Move	Hollywood Montrose	Gay	Meshach Taylor	A flamboyant black man.	United States	
Marvel Cinematic Universe	2011	Thor	Loki	Bisexual / Genderfluid	Tom Hiddleston	The shape-shifting god of mischief and adoptive son of Odin. (Loki's bisexuality and genderfluidity was confirmed in the Loki TV series. Loki is canonically bisexual and genderfluid in the comics.)	United States	
Marvel Cinematic Universe	2012	The Avengers	Loki	Bisexual / Genderfluid	Tom Hiddleston	The shape-shifting god of mischief and adoptive son of Odin. (Loki's bisexuality and genderfluidity was confirmed in the Loki TV series. Loki is canonically bisexual and genderfluid in the comics.)	United States	
Marvel Cinematic Universe	2013	Thor: The Dark World	Loki	Bisexual / Genderfluid	Tom Hiddleston	The shape-shifting god of mischief and adoptive son of Odin. (Loki's bisexuality and genderfluidity was confirmed in the Loki TV series. Loki is canonically bisexual and genderfluid in the comics.)	United States	
Marvel Cinematic Universe	2017	Thor: Ragnarok	Valkyrie	Bisexual	Tessa Thompson	The scene confirming the character's bisexuality was deleted from the film and her sexual orientation is instead only alluded to. (Valkyrie is canonically bisexual in the comics the movie was based on.)	United States	
Marvel Cinematic Universe	2017	Thor: Ragnarok	Loki	Bisexual / Genderfluid	Tom Hiddleston	The shape-shifting god of mischief and adoptive son of Odin whose bisexuality and genderfluidity was confirmed in the Loki TV series (Loki is canonically bisexual and genderfluid in the comics).	United States	
Marvel Cinematic Universe	2018	Avengers: Infinity War	Loki	Bisexual / Genderfluid	Tom Hiddleston	The shape-shifting god of mischief and adoptive son of Odin whose bisexuality and genderfluidity was confirmed in the Loki TV series (Loki is canonically bisexual and genderfluid in the comics).	United States	
Marvel Cinematic Universe	2018	Black Panther	Ayo	Lesbian	Florence Kasumba	Based on the Marvel Comics character of the same name who has a lesbian lover in the Dora Milaje.	United States	
Marvel Cinematic Universe	2019	Avengers: Endgame	Grieving man	Gay	Joe Russo	The first openly gay character portrayed in a Marvel Cinematic Universe film, he was at a support group brought together by Steve Rogers.	United States	
Marvel Cinematic Universe	2019	Avengers: Endgame	Valkyrie	Bisexual	Tessa Thompson	In the film, she is crowned King of Asgard.	United States	
Marvel Cinematic Universe	2021	Eternals	Phastos	Gay	Brian Tyree Henry	Phastos is the first superhero to be depicted as gay in an MCU film, living with his husband and their child. Ben is Phastos' husband.	United States	
Marvel Cinematic Universe	2021	Eternals	Ben	Gay	Haaz Sleiman	Phastos is the first superhero to be depicted as gay in an MCU film, living with his husband and their child. Ben is Phastos' husband.	United States	
Marvel Cinematic Universe	2022	Black Panther: Wakanda Forever	Aneka	Lesbian	Michaela Coel	Aneka and Ayo are a couple.	United States	
Marvel Cinematic Universe	2022	Black Panther: Wakanda Forever	Ayo	Lesbian	Florence Kasumba	Aneka and Ayo are a couple.	United States	
Marvel Cinematic Universe	2022	Doctor Strange in the Multiverse of Madness	Amalia Chavez	Lesbian	Chess Lopez	Amalia and Elena are America Chavez's mothers.	United States	
Marvel Cinematic Universe	2022	Doctor Strange in the Multiverse of Madness	Elena Chavez	Lesbian	Ruth Livier	Amalia and Elena are America Chavez's mothers.	United States	
Marvel Cinematic Universe	2022	Thor: Love and Thunder	Korg	Gay	Taika Waititi	At the end of the film, Korg has entered a relationship with a fellow Kronan man named Dwayne.	United States	
Marvel Cinematic Universe	2024	Deadpool & Wolverine	Deadpool / Wade Wilson	Pansexual	Ryan Reynolds	While Tim Miller, director of the first Deadpool film, described Deadpool as pansexual, this is never explicitly portrayed on-screen.	United States	
Marvel Cinematic Universe	2024	Deadpool & Wolverine	Negasonic Teenage Warhead	Lesbian	Brianna Hildebrand	Negasonic Teenage Warhead and Yukio are in a relationship.	United States	
Marvel Cinematic Universe	2024	Deadpool & Wolverine	Yukio	Lesbian	Shioli Kutsuna	Negasonic Teenage Warhead and Yukio are in a relationship.	United States	
Millennium	2009	The Girl with the Dragon Tattoo	Lisbeth Salander	Bisexual	Noomi Rapace	Salander is a world-class computer hacker with a photographic memory. Under the pseudonym "Wasp", she becomes a prominent figure in the international hacker community known as the Hacker Republic (similar to the group Anonymous).	Sweden	
Millennium	2009	The Girl Who Played with Fire	Lisbeth Salander	Bisexual	Noomi Rapace	Salander is a world-class computer hacker with a photographic memory. Under the pseudonym "Wasp", she becomes a prominent figure in the international hacker community known as the Hacker Republic (similar to the group Anonymous).	Sweden	
Millennium	2009	The Girl Who Kicked the Hornets' Nest	Lisbeth Salander	Bisexual	Noomi Rapace	Salander is a world-class computer hacker with a photographic memory. Under the pseudonym "Wasp", she becomes a prominent figure in the international hacker community known as the Hacker Republic (similar to the group Anonymous).	Sweden	
Millennium	2011	The Girl with the Dragon Tattoo	Lisbeth Salander	Bisexual	Rooney Mara	Salander has an on-again/off-again romantic relationship with Wu.	Sweden, Germany, United Kingdom, United States	
Millennium	2011	The Girl with the Dragon Tattoo	Miriam "Mimi" Wu	Bisexual	Elodie Yung	Salander has an on-again/off-again romantic relationship with Wu.	Sweden, Germany, United Kingdom, United States	
Millennium	2018	The Girl in the Spider's Web	Lisbeth Salander	Bisexual	Claire Foy	In this version, in addition of being a computer hacker, Salander also has an estranged sister who the head of a major crime syndicate. She has been the lover of both Mikael Blomkvist and Sofia.	Canada, Germany, United States, Sweden, United Kingdom	
Millennium	2018	The Girl in the Spider's Web	Sofia	Lesbian	Andreja Pejić	In this version, in addition of being a computer hacker, Salander also has an estranged sister who the head of a major crime syndicate. She has been the lover of both Mikael Blomkvist and Sofia.	Canada, Germany, United States, Sweden, United Kingdom	
Mulan	1998	Mulan	Li Shang	Bisexual	BD Wong	Critics consider Li Shang's attraction began before Li Shang knew Mulan was a woman.	United States	
Mulan	2004	Mulan II	Li Shang	Bisexual	BD Wong	Critics consider Li Shang's attraction began before Li Shang knew Mulan was a woman.	United States	
Pitch Perfect	2012	Pitch Perfect	Cynthia Rose Adams	Lesbian	Esther Dean	She reveals to the Barden Bellas that her gambling addiction has been causing problems with her girlfriend (stated in dialog near the end of the first film).	United States	
Pitch Perfect	2015	Pitch Perfect 2	Cynthia Rose Adams	Lesbian	Esther Dean	She reveals to the Barden Bellas that her gambling addiction has been causing problems with her girlfriend (stated in dialog near the end of the first film).	United States	
Pitch Perfect	2017	Pitch Perfect 3	Cynthia Rose Adams	Lesbian	Esther Dean	She reveals to the Barden Bellas that her gambling addiction has been causing problems with her girlfriend (stated in dialog near the end of the first film).	United States	
The Producers	1967	The Producers	Carmen Ghia	Gay	Andreas Voutsinas	Carmen is the companion of Roger De Bris, a flamboyant director who is directing "Springtime for Hitler".	United States	
The Producers	1967	The Producers	Roger De Bris	Gay	Christopher Hewett	Carmen is the companion of Roger De Bris, a flamboyant director who is directing "Springtime for Hitler".	United States	
The Producers	2005	The Producers	Carmen Ghia	Gay	Roger Bart	Just as in the 1967 film, Carmen is the confidente of Roger De Bris.	United States	
The Producers	2005	The Producers	Roger De Bris	Gay	Gary Beach	Just as in the 1967 film, Carmen is the confidente of Roger De Bris.	United States	
Scary Movie	2000	Scary Movie	Bobby Prinze	Gay	Jon Abrahams	Ray Wilkins is a closeted homosexual who dates Brenda Meeks. At the end of the movie, Bobby Prinze announces he is gay and in a relationship with Ray, who denies this.	United States	
Scary Movie	2000	Scary Movie	Ray Wilkins	Gay	Shawn Wayans	Ray Wilkins is a closeted homosexual who dates Brenda Meeks. At the end of the movie, Bobby Prinze announces he is gay and in a relationship with Ray, who denies this.	United States	
Scary Movie	2001	Scary Movie 2	Ray Wilkins	Gay	Shawn Wayans	Ray is still a closeted gay.	United States	
Scary Movie	2026	Scary Movie	Ray Wilkins	Gay	Shawn Wayans	Ray declares that he is ex-gay, but is still actually closeted.	United States	
Scary Movie	2026	Scary Movie	Jess	Trans man	Benny Zielke	Jess is the transgender son of the town sheriff.	United States	
Scary Movie	2026	Scary Movie	Dei	Non-binary	Sydney Park	Dei is the non-binary child of Brenda Meeks.	United States	
Scream	2022	Scream	Mindy Meeks-Martin	Lesbian	Jasmin Savoy Brown	Mindy is a Woodsboro teenager and the fraternal twin sister of Chad.	United States	
Scream	2023	Scream VI	Mindy Meeks-Martin	Lesbian	Jasmin Savoy Brown	Mindy is a Woodsboro teenager and the fraternal twin sister of Chad.	United States	
Scream	2023	Scream VI	Anika Kayoko	Lesbian	Devyn Nekoda	Anika is the girlfriend of Mindy.	United States	
Scream	2026	Scream 7	Mindy Meeks-Martin	Lesbian	Jasmin Savoy Brown	Mindy is a Woodsboro teenager and the fraternal twin sister of Chad.	United States	
Star Trek	2009	Star Trek	Hikaru Sulu	Gay	John Cho	The film franchise is based on the television series of the same name, and the changing of the character's original sexual orientation from heterosexual to gay led George Takei to express his disappointment with the decision.	United States	
Star Trek	2013	Star Trek Into Darkness	Hikaru Sulu	Gay	John Cho	The film franchise is based on the television series of the same name, and the changing of the character's original sexual orientation from heterosexual to gay led George Takei to express his disappointment with the decision.	United States	
Star Trek	2016	Star Trek Beyond	Hikaru Sulu	Gay	John Cho	The film franchise is based on the television series of the same name, and the changing of the character's original sexual orientation from heterosexual to gay led George Takei to express his disappointment with the decision.	United States	
Star Wars	1980	The Empire Strikes Back	Lando Calrissian	Pansexual	Billy Dee Williams	Lando, a gambler, con artist, playboy, mining engineer, and businessman who administered Cloud City, was confirmed as pansexual, and having fluidity in his sexuality, by a co-writer of Solo, Jonathan Kasdan. Some took this to be a "deeply regressive" move by suggesting this to fans without delivering on it, even as Donald Glover supported the interpretation.	United States	
Star Wars	1983	Return of the Jedi	Lando Calrissian	Pansexual	Billy Dee Williams	Lando, a gambler, con artist, playboy, mining engineer, and businessman who administered Cloud City, was confirmed as pansexual, and having fluidity in his sexuality, by a co-writer of Solo, Jonathan Kasdan. Some took this to be a "deeply regressive" move by suggesting this to fans without delivering on it, even as Donald Glover supported the interpretation.	United States	
Star Wars	1999	Star Wars: Episode I – The Phantom Menace	Sabé	Bisexual	Keira Knightley	A handmaiden and double of Queen Amidala. Her sexuality was confirmed in the 2019 novel Queen's Shadow.	United States	
Star Wars	2017	Star Wars: The Last Jedi	Larma D'Acy	Lesbian	Amanda Lawrence	Commander of the Resistance who shares a kiss with the female pilot Wrobie Tyce at the end of The Rise of Skywalker.	United States	
Star Wars	2018	Solo: A Star Wars Story	Lando Calrissian	Pansexual	Donald Glover	The same character from the 1980 film.	United States	
Star Wars	2019	Star Wars: The Rise of Skywalker	Lando Calrissian	Pansexual	Billy Dee Williams	The same character from the 1980 film.	United States	
Star Wars	2019	Star Wars: The Rise of Skywalker	Larma D'Acy	Lesbian	Amanda Lawrence	Lesbian Resistance commander and pilot who share a kiss at the end of the film.	United States	
Star Wars	2019	Star Wars: The Rise of Skywalker	Wrobie Tyce	Lesbian	Vinette Robinson	Lesbian Resistance commander and pilot who share a kiss at the end of the film.	United States	
Wizarding World	2001	Harry Potter and the Philosopher's Stone	Albus Dumbledore	Gay	Richard Harris	Albus Dumbledore is the headmaster of the wizarding school Hogwarts. In the Harry Potter series, although Dumbledore's sexual orientation is not portrayed or explicitly mentioned in the films and books they are based on, J. K. Rowling (author of the Harry Potter series of fantasy novels) revealed in 2007 that he is gay. (Note: In Fantastic Beasts: The Secrets of Dumbledore (2022), Dumbledore is confirmed to have been in a past romantic relationship with Gellert Grindelwald.)	United Kingdom, United States	
Wizarding World	2002	Harry Potter and the Chamber of Secrets	Albus Dumbledore	Gay	Richard Harris	Albus Dumbledore is the headmaster of the wizarding school Hogwarts. In the Harry Potter series, although Dumbledore's sexual orientation is not portrayed or explicitly mentioned in the films and books they are based on, J. K. Rowling (author of the Harry Potter series of fantasy novels) revealed in 2007 that he is gay.	United Kingdom, United States	
Wizarding World	2004	Harry Potter and the Prisoner of Azkaban	Albus Dumbledore	Gay	Michael Gambon	Albus Dumbledore is the headmaster of the wizarding school Hogwarts. In the Harry Potter series, although Dumbledore's sexual orientation is not portrayed or explicitly mentioned in the films and books they are based on, J. K. Rowling (author of the Harry Potter series of fantasy novels) revealed in 2007 that he is gay.	United Kingdom, United States	
Wizarding World	2005	Harry Potter and the Goblet of Fire	Albus Dumbledore	Gay	Michael Gambon	Albus Dumbledore is the headmaster of the wizarding school Hogwarts. In the Harry Potter series, although Dumbledore's sexual orientation is not portrayed or explicitly mentioned in the films and books they are based on, J. K. Rowling (author of the Harry Potter series of fantasy novels) revealed in 2007 that he is gay.	United Kingdom, United States	
Wizarding World	2007	Harry Potter and the Order of the Phoenix	Albus Dumbledore	Gay	Michael Gambon	Albus Dumbledore is the headmaster of the wizarding school Hogwarts. In the Harry Potter series, although Dumbledore's sexual orientation is not portrayed or explicitly mentioned in the films and books they are based on, J. K. Rowling (author of the Harry Potter series of fantasy novels) revealed in 2007 that he is gay.	United Kingdom, United States	
Wizarding World	2009	Harry Potter and the Half-Blood Prince	Albus Dumbledore	Gay	Michael Gambon	Albus Dumbledore is the headmaster of the wizarding school Hogwarts. In the Harry Potter series, although Dumbledore's sexual orientation is not portrayed or explicitly mentioned in the films and books they are based on, J. K. Rowling (author of the Harry Potter series of fantasy novels) revealed in 2007 that he is gay.	United Kingdom, United States	
Wizarding World	2010	Harry Potter and the Deathly Hallows – Part 1	Albus Dumbledore	Gay	Michael Gambon	Albus Dumbledore is the headmaster of the wizarding school Hogwarts. In the Harry Potter series, although Dumbledore's sexual orientation is not portrayed or explicitly mentioned in the films and books they are based on, J. K. Rowling (author of the Harry Potter series of fantasy novels) revealed in 2007 that he is gay.	United Kingdom, United States	
Wizarding World	2011	Harry Potter and the Deathly Hallows – Part 2	Albus Dumbledore	Gay	Michael Gambon	Albus Dumbledore is the headmaster of the wizarding school Hogwarts. In the Harry Potter series, although Dumbledore's sexual orientation is not portrayed or explicitly mentioned in the films and books they are based on, J. K. Rowling (author of the Harry Potter series of fantasy novels) revealed in 2007 that he is gay.	United Kingdom, United States	
Wizarding World	2016	Fantastic Beasts and Where to Find Them	Gellert Grindelwald	Gay	Johnny Depp	In the prequel series, Fantastic Beasts, the relationship in their youth between Dumbledore and the dark wizard Grindelwald is referenced.	United Kingdom, United States	
Wizarding World	2018	Fantastic Beasts and the Crimes of Grindlewald	Albus Dumbledore	Gay	Jude Law	In the prequel series, Fantastic Beasts, the relationship in their youth between Dumbledore and the dark wizard Grindelwald is referenced.	United Kingdom, United States	
Wizarding World	2018	Fantastic Beasts and the Crimes of Grindlewald	Albus Dumbledore	Gay	Toby Regbo	In the prequel series, Fantastic Beasts, the relationship in their youth between Dumbledore and the dark wizard Grindelwald is referenced.	United Kingdom, United States	
Wizarding World	2018	Fantastic Beasts and the Crimes of Grindlewald	Gellert Grindlewald	Gay	Johnny Depp	In the prequel series, Fantastic Beasts, the relationship in their youth between Dumbledore and the dark wizard Grindelwald is referenced.	United Kingdom, United States	
Wizarding World	2022	Fantastic Beasts and the Secrets of Dumbledore	Albus Dumbledore	Gay	Jude Law	In the prequel series, Fantastic Beasts, the relationship in their youth between Dumbledore and the dark wizard Grindelwald is referenced.	United Kingdom, United States	
Wizarding World	2022	Fantastic Beasts and the Secrets of Dumbledore	Gellert Grindlewald	Gay	Mads Mikkelson	In the prequel series, Fantastic Beasts, the relationship in their youth between Dumbledore and the dark wizard Grindelwald is referenced.	United Kingdom, United States	
The Wonderful Wizard of Oz	2024	Wicked	Pfannee	Gay	Bowen Yang	Pfannee is one of Glinda's college friends who later works as one of her assistants. Pfannee's actor Yang confirmed his sexuality in an interview.		United States
The Wonderful Wizard of Oz	2025	Wicked: For Good	Pfannee	Gay	Bowen Yang	Pfannee is one of Glinda's college friends who later works as one of her assistants. Pfannee's actor Yang confirmed his sexuality in an interview.		United States
X-Men	2016	Deadpool	Deadpool / Wade Wilson	Pansexual	Ryan Reynolds	While Tim Miller, director of the first film, described Deadpool as pansexual, this is never explicitly portrayed on-screen.	United States	
X-Men	2016	Deadpool	Negasonic Teenage Warhead	Lesbian	Brianna Hildebrand	Negasonic Teenage Warhead and Yukio are in a relationship.	United States	
X-Men	2018	Deadpool 2	Deadpool / Wade Wilson	Pansexual	Ryan Reynolds	Same character from the 2016 film.	United States	
X-Men	2018	Deadpool 2	Negasonic Teenage Warhead	Lesbian	Brianna Hildebrand	Negasonic Teenage Warhead and Yukio are in a relationship.	United States	
X-Men	2018	Deadpool 2	Yukio	Lesbian	Shioli Kutsuna	Negasonic Teenage Warhead and Yukio are in a relationship.	United States	
X-Men	2020	The New Mutants	Mirage / Danielle Moonstar	Lesbian	Blu Hunt	Mirage is a Native American mutant who can create illusions based on the fears and desires of other people. She and Wolfsbane are in a relationship.	United States	
X-Men	2020	The New Mutants	Wolfsbane / Rahne Sinclair	Lesbian	Maisie Williams	Mirage is a Native American mutant who can create illusions based on the fears and desires of other people. She and Wolfsbane are in a relationship.	United States	

== See also ==
- List of feature films with lesbian characters
- List of feature films with gay characters
- List of feature films with bisexual characters
- List of feature films with transgender characters
- List of animated films with LGBT characters
- List of made-for-television films with LGBT characters
- List of LGBT-related films
