= List of number-one DVDs of 2002 (UK) =

== Chart history ==
Issue date	Number-one DVD
7 January	Shrek
14 January	Shrek
21 January	Final Fantasy
28 January	Swordfish
4 February	Swordfish
11 February	Jurassic Park III
18 February	Planet of the Apes
25 February	Planet of the Apes
4 March	Moulin Rouge!
11 March	Moulin Rouge!
18 March	American Pie 2
25 March	American Pie 2
1 April	American Pie 2
8 April	American Pie 2
15 April	Amélie
22 April	Apocalypse Now
29 April	Apocalypse Now
6 May	Harry Potter and the Philosopher's Stone
13 May	Harry Potter and the Philosopher's Stone
20 May	Harry Potter and the Philosopher's Stone
27 May	Harry Potter and the Philosopher's Stone
3 June	Harry Potter and the Philosopher's Stone
10 June	Harry Potter and the Philosopher's Stone
17 June	Buffy the Vampire Slayer Season 6
24 June	The Shawshank Redemption
1 July	Scary Movie 2
8 July	Friends Season 8 Episodes 13-16
15 July	Training Day
22 July	Training Day
29 July	Training Day
5 August	The Lord of the Rings: The Fellowship of the Ring
12 August	The Lord of the Rings: The Fellowship of the Ring
19 August	The Lord of the Rings: The Fellowship of the Ring
26 August	The Lord of the Rings: The Fellowship of the Ring
2 September	Monsters, Inc.
9 September	Monsters, Inc.
16 September	Monsters, Inc.
23 September	Monsters, Inc.
30 September	Blade II
7 October	The Time Machine
14 October	Ocean's Eleven
21 October	Ice Age
28 October	Ice Age
4 November	Beauty and the Beast
11 November	Star Wars: Episode II – Attack of the Clones
18 November	Star Wars: Episode II – Attack of the Clones
25 November	Scooby-Doo: The Movie
2 December	Scooby-Doo: The Movie
9 December	Scooby-Doo: The Movie
16 December	Scooby-Doo: The Movie
23 December	The Lord of the Rings: The Fellowship of the Ring
30 December	The Lord of the Rings: The Fellowship of the Ring
