= Brenda Meeks =

Fictional support character from the Scary Movie franchise

- Scary Movie character
- Regina Hall as Brenda Meeks in Scary Movie
- First appearance: Scary Movie (2000)
- Created by: Shawn Wayans; Marlon Wayans; Buddy Johnson; Phil Beauman
- Based on: Hallie McDaniel; Maureen Evans; Karla Wilson; Martha Meeks; Sue Ann "Ma" Ellington
- Portrayed by: Regina Hall

In-universe information
- Occupation: High school student (Scary Movie (2000)); College student (Scary Movie 2); Teacher (Scary Movie 3); News reporter (Scary Movie 4); Housewife (Scary Movie (2026))
- Family: Mr. Meeks (father); Mrs. Meeks (mother); Shorty Meeks (half-brother); Unnamed half-human baby (son); Brad Meeks (son; deceased); Dei Meeks (daughter; deceased)
- Significant others: Ray Wilkins (husband)

Brenda Meeks is a fictional character of the Scary Movie franchise. She is portrayed by Regina Hall, and was created by Shawn Wayans, Marlon Wayans, Buddy Johnson and Phil Beauman. Meeks debuted as a high school student in Scary Movie (2000), parodying characters seen in the Scream and I Know What You Did Last Summer franchises.

Brenda is the best friend of Cindy Campbell, sister of Shorty Meeks, and sometimes girlfriend of Ray Wilkins. Brenda Meeks has appeared in most of the films in the Scary Movie franchise, except for Scary Movie 5 (2013). The character dies in both Scary Movie and Scary Movie 3 (2003), but returns without explanation. Hall reprised her role as Meeks in the sixth installment, Scary Movie (2026).

== Appearances ==
Brenda Meeks is the half-sister of Shorty Meeks (Marlon Wayans) and best friend of Cindy Campbell (Anna Faris). In Scary Movie she attends high school with Cindy, Shorty, her closeted boyfriend Ray (Shawn Wayans), and her two other friends Buffy (Shannon Elizabeth) and Greg (Lochlyn Munro). (Note: As depicted in Scary Movie (2000)) Brenda is killed in a movie theater by the movie-goers after she shows improper theater etiquette while watching Shakespeare in Love.

Brenda inexplicably returns in Scary Movie 2. She attends college and takes part in a supernatural experiment. (Note: As depicted in Scary Movie (2001))

In Scary Movie 3 Brenda has become a teacher and remains in contact with Cindy. She is killed by a Ring-esque ghost and, at her wake, Cindy's friend George, whose niece Sue is a student of Brenda's, accidentally causes her corpse to explode after mistakenly believing she is still alive.

Brenda once again inexplicably returns in Scary Movie 4 as a news reporter; in this movie Brenda and Cindy fight off aliens. At the end of the film, she gives birth to a Billy the Puppet-esque baby.

Brenda and Cindy are not featured in Scary Movie 5, but reappeared in Scary Movie (2026). Brenda was confirmed to be returning to the franchise in August 2025 via Instagram. Hall and Faris released a joint statement to Deadline stating their excitement to reprise the roles. In the movie trailer, Brenda is depicted as a parody of the titular character of Ma. She is married to Ray with two children, Dei and Brad.

== Creation and development ==
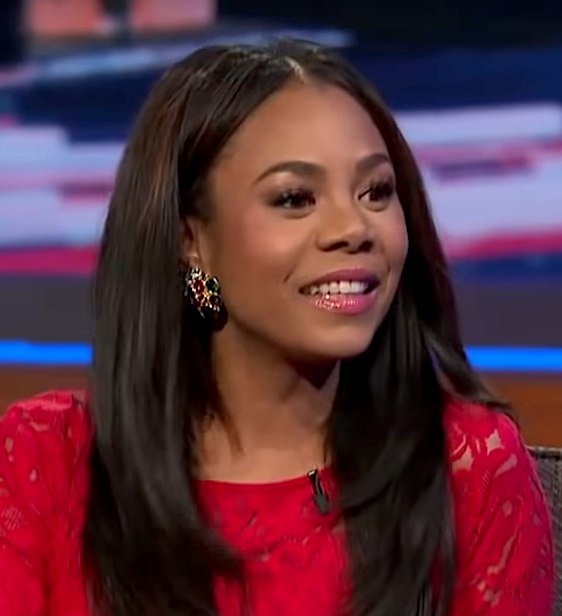
Hall in 2014

Brenda Meeks is loosely based on black characters of slasher films of the 1990s, such as Brandy Norwood's character Karla Wilson in I Still Know What You Did Last Summer and Jada Pinkett Smith's character Maureen Evans in Scream 2.

Aaliyah was initially considered for the part of Brenda, but turned down the role due to her thoughts on the script and friendship with Brandy Norwood. Christina Milian and Lil Kim were also considered.

Regina Hall ultimately landed the part, and has stated she used improvisation while playing the role, despite film director Keenen Ivory Wayans originally asking her not to "bother" the character and instead follow the script.

Brenda received her own Letterboxd account to promote the sixth film.

== Reception ==
The character of Brenda Meeks throughout the franchise has been deemed "iconic" for her comedic and memorable moments. The characters pairing with Faris' character Cindy has them regarded as final girls and staples of the franchise.

Kristin Corry of Vice praised Brenda, describing her as the "voice of reason" who expresses what viewers are thinking as they watch the film. She argues that while Maureen is a cynical Black character created for White audiences and intended to die first as part of a common horror film trope, Brenda stands apart because of her cynicism.

The Statesman describes her as a "quick wit" and "sass" character that articulates "unforgettable one-liners". About Brenda's unexplained returns following her deaths, Carly Levy of Cinema Blend comments that "the best parody movies" do not require continuity.
