= Cindy Campbell =

Fictional lead character from the Scary Movie franchise

- Scary Movie character
- Anna Faris as Cindy Campbell in Scary Movie 4 (2006)
- First appearance: Scary Movie (2000)
- Created by: Shawn Wayans; Marlon Wayans; Buddy Johnson; Phil Beauman
- Based on: Sidney Prescott; Julie James; Eleanor Vance; Rachel Keller; Karen Davis; Laurie Strode
- Portrayed by: Anna Faris

In-universe information
- Occupation: High school student (Scary Movie); College student (Scary Movie 2); News presenter (Scary Movie 3); Women's boxer (Scary Movie 4); Health professional (Scary Movie 4)
- Family: Neil Campbell (father); Mrs. Campbell (mother, deceased); Unnamed older sister (deceased); Cody Campbell (nephew); Tom Logan (brother-in-law, deceased); Sara Campbell (oldest daughter, presumed deceased); Tuesday Campbell (youngest daughter, presumed deceased)
- Spouse: George Logan (deceased)
- Significant others: Bobby Prinze (original film); Buddy Sanderson (second film); Tom Ryan (fourth film)

Cindy Campbell is a fictional character and the main protagonist of the Scary Movie franchise. Portrayed by Anna Faris and created by Shawn Wayans, Marlon Wayans, Buddy Johnson, and Phil Beauman, the character first appeared as a high school student in Scary Movie (2000). In the film, whose main parodies are the Scream and I Know What You Did Last Summer franchises, Cindy shares a role similar to Sidney Prescott and Julie James.

Faris would reprise her role of Cindy in the film's sequels, although each film presents a different version of the character without being related to each other. In Scary Movie 2, Cindy is attending college and with her friends, goes to Hell House for Professor Oldman's experiment. Here, her role is based on Eleanor Vance from The Haunting. In Scary Movie 3, where her role is based on Rachel Keller from The Ring, she is portrayed as a news presenter and has a nephew, Cody. After seeing a cursed tape, she tries to break the curse before seven days pass and she dies. In Scary Movie 4, where she parodies Karen Davis from The Grudge, Cindy is working as a caregiver in a haunted house and attempts to stop an alien attack with the help of Brenda.

Up until the fourth installment, Faris and Regina Hall, who portrayed Brenda Meeks, were the only cast members to appear in every installment of the franchise. Faris did not return for Scary Movie 5 and Cindy was replaced by Ashley Tisdale's character, Jody Sanders. Critical response to Faris' portrayal has been positive.

== Appearances ==
=== Scary Movie (2000) ===
Cindy is a high school student attending B. A. Corpse High School with her boyfriend Bobby Prinze. Their friends include Brenda Meeks, Buffy Gilmore, Ray Wilkins and Greg Phillipe. Despite being in a committed relationship with Bobby, the two of them still have not consummated their relationship. Following Drew Decker's death, it is revealed that one year prior, the six of them had accidentally ran over a man while drinking. While the man was unharmed, they did not notice and after accidentally knocking him unconscious, dumped his body at a pier. Later the same day, she notices a masked killer outside her classroom and a note on her desk telling her that "they know what she did last Halloween". After being attacked by the killer, she assumes that Bobby is the killer and gets him arrested. After the real killer calls her, she decides to invite her friends to keep each other safe. Thanks to Shorty, the small get-together turns into a party. After having sex with Bobby, it is revealed that he is gay and in a relationship with Ray. Despite killing Shorty, they reveal to her that they are copycats of the real killer who appears and kills both of them. After knocking him out, Cindy is taken to the police station where she realizes Doofy, Buffy's brother, is the killer. Despite running after him, Doofy manages to escape, leaving Cindy screaming in the middle of the street, only to get ran over by a car.

=== Scary Movie 2 ===
One year after the events of the previous film, Cindy is attending college with Brenda, Shorty and Ray, despite all three of them having died in the previous film and the latter having tried to kill her.

Cindy and her friends (including her new love interest Buddy) then are invited to an experiment on insomnia. Little did they know, it was an invite to a haunted house. Cindy then joins the house alongside her friends and meets the people that works for the house.

After a long time, Cindy and her friends gets some paranormal encounters with the ghost that haunts the house. Eventually, the ghost is defeated and they leave the haunted house. Cindy and Buddy tries to make a healthy new relationship. But after Buddy realizes that the creepy butler Hanson that worked for the haunted house is alive, he runs away and is never seen again. Cindy gets desperate, only to have Hanson get ran over by a car.

=== Scary Movie 3 ===
Now a journalist, Cindy has custody of her paranormally gifted nephew, Cody, after his mother (her older sister) died giving birth to him. She again meets Brenda, now a teacher. Unnerved, Brenda asks Cindy to stay with her for the night, when she says she watched a cursed tape. Brenda is murdered by a supernatural girl named Tabitha after failing to turn off the TV. Cindy goes after the answer to the curse of the tape, discovering that aliens are also involved, all while trying to protect Cody and her new friends, Tom Logan, his daughter, and brother George, who becomes Cindy's love interest. After breaking the curse, she marries George.

=== Scary Movie 4 ===
Cindy has become broke and lonely because her husband George had died and her nephew Cody has enrolled in military academy.

Over the following day, Cindy bonds with Tom Ryan, confiding to him about George's death in a fateful boxing match. The two realize their newfound love, but are interrupted by a gigantic triPod which disables electricity and starts vaporizing the town residents.

Cindy converses in mock Japanese with the haunted house's ghost, Toshio, learning that the answer of the invasion is his father's heart. While Tom leaves the city with his children, Cindy reunites with her friend, Brenda Meeks, miraculously alive after her death (having been pieced back together by Mahalik). Following Toshio's directions, the two head to the countryside and end up in a mysterious, isolated community. They are captured and put to trial headed by Henry Hale. The result allows them to live but never leave the village.

Tom and his children drive and find themselves in the middle of a war between the U.S. military and the aliens. Excited with the conflict, Robbie runs away, while Tom and Rachel are taken by the triPod. Back at the village, Henry is killed by the village loon, Ezekiel, revealing to Cindy that he fathered Toshio, who was killed during Cindy's boxing match. Cindy and Brenda are soon taken by the triPod and sent to the bathroom seen in the prologue, and they get stuck into the Venus flytrap. Cindy manages to get through Billy's challenge, but is threatened with the safety of Tom and his children, who are put to traps. Looking at a toilet with the "heart" nearby, Cindy realizes that Billy, through Henry's wife, is the true father of Toshio. Seeing how far Tom would go to save his children, Billy apologizes for the invasion and releases them. Robbie and Rachel are successfully returned to their mother who is revealed to have married a much older man. Brenda also becomes romantically involved with Billy's brother, Zoltar. Meanwhile, Tom appears in The Oprah Winfrey Show and wildly professes his love for Cindy by jumping around, throwing Cindy, and crushing Oprah's wrists and hitting her with a chair.

=== Scary Movie (2026) ===
Twenty-years following Scary Movie 4. She now has two daughters, Sara (with her ex-boyfriend, Bobby) and Tuesday, but has been estranged from them for years due to her constant worry that Ghostface will return, leading her to turn her home into a trap. Sara and she hadn't spoken for 6 years, but they reconnected following Tuesday's attack by Ghostface, believed to be a ploy to lure her out of the house. While they are targeted by a new killer impersonating the original Ghostface killer as well as mimicking other horror icons. She is a parody of the incarnation of Laurie Strode from the 2018-2022 Blumhouse Halloween trilogy.

== Development ==
=== Parody and inspiration ===
In Scary Movie (2000), Cindy is a parody of Sidney Prescott from Scream and Julie James from I Know What You Did Last Summer. Her first name is a play on Sidney, while her last name is taken from Neve Campbell, who portrayed Sidney in the Scream franchise.

=== Casting and portrayal ===
In an interview with People, it was revealed that Anna Faris beat out about hundreds of actresses who auditioned for the role of Cindy, such as Melissa Joan Hart. Alicia Silverstone reportedly turned down the role. Keenen Ivory Wayans, director of the first two films, said about Faris that "there was a great freshness about her, because [she] had nothing to lose. She didn't think in a million years she was going to get the part".

Faris revealed that Scary Movie was her first Hollywood audition and that she highly enjoyed working on the franchise as it allowed her to be funny, feeling that female characters are not often allowed to be funny in films. Additionally, she stated that one of the things she liked about the franchise is that "[they] can spoof whatever [they want,] take what's popular at the moment and slide it into a very complicated plot structure".

== Reception ==
=== Critical response ===
Bruce G. Hallenbeck, in his book Comedy-Horror Films: A Chronological History, 1914–2008, described Faris as "the real discovery of Scary Movie, the one performer who tries valiantly to hold everything together".
