= Scary Movie 4 =

2006 film by David Zucker

- Theatrical release poster
- Directed by: David Zucker
- Screenplay by: Craig Mazin; Jim Abrahams; Pat Proft
- Story by: Craig Mazin
- Based on: Characters by: Shawn Wayans; Marlon Wayans; Buddy Johnson; Phil Beauman; Jason Friedberg Aaron Seltzer
- Produced by: Robert K. Weiss; Craig Mazin
- Starring: Anna Faris; Regina Hall; Craig Bierko; Bill Pullman; Anthony Anderson; Carmen Electra; Chris Elliott; Kevin Hart; Cloris Leachman; Michael Madsen; Phil McGraw; Leslie Nielsen; Shaquille O'Neal; Molly Shannon
- Cinematography: Thomas E. Ackerman
- Edited by: Craig Herring; Tom Lewis
- Music by: James L. Venable
- Production company: Brad Grey Pictures
- Distributed by: Dimension Films
- Release dates: April 10, 2006 (AMC Loews Lincoln Square Theater); April 14, 2006 (United States)
- Running time: 83 minutes
- Country: United States
- Language: English
- Budget: $40 million
- Box office: $178.7 million

Scary Movie 4 is a 2006 American parody film directed by David Zucker from a screenplay by Craig Mazin, Jim Abrahams, and Pat Proft, based on a story by Mazin. It is the sequel to Scary Movie 3 (2003) and the fourth installment in the Scary Movie film series. The film stars Anna Faris, Regina Hall, Anthony Anderson, Kevin Hart, and Leslie Nielsen reprising their roles from the previous installment, with Craig Bierko, Bill Pullman, Cloris Leachman, Michael Madsen, Dr. Phil McGraw, Shaquille O'Neal, and Molly Shannon joining the cast. Carmen Electra and Chris Elliott also return playing new characters.

Scary Movie 4 premiered at the AMC Loews Lincoln Square Theater in New York City, New York on April 10, 2006, and was released in the United States on April 14, by Dimension Films. The film received mixed reviews from critics, but grossed $178 million on a $40 million budget.

A standalone sequel, Scary Movie 5, was released in 2013.

== Plot ==
Shaquille O'Neal and Dr. Phil wake up to find themselves chained to pipes in a bathroom. Their host, Billy the Puppet, reveals that the room is slowly filling with nerve gas, with the only way out being to make a basket and get the saws, which have to be used on their feet. Unfortunately, Dr. Phil saws off the wrong foot and faints, leaving the two to die.

Meanwhile, Cindy Campbell visits her brother-in-law, Tom Logan in New York City. Her husband George has died, and her nephew Cody has enrolled in military academy, leaving her heartbroken and lonely. Tom's attempted suicide results in his ingesting Viagra, which greatly erects his penis and causes his death when he falls off the railing. Afterwards, Cindy takes a job to care for Mrs. Norris, who lives in a haunted house. Next door is Tom Ryan, who runs into George's friends Mahalik and CJ, learning about their homosexual one-night stand. He is greeted at home by the arrival of his estranged children, Robbie and Rachel. Over the following day, Cindy bonds with Tom, confiding to him about George's death in a fateful boxing match. The two realize their newfound love but are interrupted by a gigantic triPod which disables electricity and starts vaporizing the town residents.

Cindy converses in mock Japanese with the haunted house's ghost, a silent boy with pale skin, learning that the answer of the invasion is his father's heart. While Tom leaves the city with his children, Cindy reunites with her friend, Brenda Meeks, inexplicably alive after her death. Following the Japanese boy's directions, the two head to the countryside and end up in a mysterious, isolated community. They are captured and put to trial headed by Henry Hale. The result allows them to live but never leave the village. Meanwhile, an emergency United Nations meeting, headed by the eccentric U.S. President Baxter Harris, who is reluctant to stop reading "My Pet Duck", goes awry when Harris presents a series of jokes that are offensive but do not appear to have any punchline and a weapon scavenged from the aliens renders everyone stark-naked.

Tom and his children drive and find themselves in the middle of a war between the U.S. military and the aliens. Excited with the conflict, Robbie runs away, while Tom and Rachel are taken by the triPod. Back at the village, Henry is killed by the village loon, Ezekiel, revealing to Cindy that he fathered the Japanese boy, who was killed during Cindy's boxing match. Cindy and Brenda are soon taken by the triPod and sent to the bathroom seen in the prologue, and they get stuck into the Venus flytrap. Cindy manages to get through the puppet's challenge but is threatened with the safety of Tom and his children, who are put in traps. Looking at a toilet with the "heart" nearby, Cindy realizes that the Puppet, through Henry's wife, is the true biological father of the Japanese boy. Seeing how far Tom would go to save his children, the Puppet, who realizes his mistakes, apologizes for the invasion and releases them. Robbie and Rachel are successfully returned to their mother, who is revealed to have married a much older man. Brenda also becomes romantically involved with the Puppet's human brother, Zoltar.

An epilogue, set one month afterwards, narrated by James Earl Jones, who is subsequently hit by a bus, reveals Brenda's giving birth to her child with Zoltar, Mahalik and CJ resuming their relationship, and President Harris being contented with his duck. Meanwhile, Tom appears in The Oprah Winfrey Show and wildly confesses his love for Cindy by jumping around, throwing Cindy across the room, then breaking Oprah's wrists and hitting her with a chair afterwards.

== Cast ==
- Anna Faris as Cindy Campbell
- Regina Hall as Brenda Meeks
- Craig Bierko as Tom Ryan
- Leslie Nielsen as President Baxter Harris
- Bill Pullman as Henry Hale
- Anthony Anderson as Mahalik Phifer
- Kevin Hart as CJ Iz
- Beau Mirchoff as Robbie Ryan
- Conchita Campbell as Rachel Ryan
- Molly Shannon as Marilyn
- Michael Madsen as Oliver
- Chris Elliott as Ezekiel
- Carmen Electra as Holly
- Cloris Leachman as Emma Norris
- Garrett Masuda as Japanese Ghost Boy
- Craig Mazin as Saw Villain (voice)
- DeRay Davis as Marvin
- Henry Mah as Mr. Koji
- Patrice O'Neal as Rashed/CrackHead
- Tomoko Sato as Japanese Ghost Woman
- Kathryn Dobbs as School Teacher
- Bryan Callen as Agent Harper
- David Zucker as Zoltar (voice)
- Angelique Naude as Waitress
- Rorelee Tio as Yoko
- Sarah Edmondson as Bar Waitress
- Edward Moss as Michael Jackson
- Champagne Powell as Don King
- Dave Attell as Knifeman
- John Reardon as Jeremiah
- Kimani Ray Smith as Cutman
- Dale Wolfe as Hang Gliding Man

=== Cameo appearances ===
- Shaquille O'Neal as himself
- Dr. Phil McGraw as himself
- Simon Rex as George Logan
- Charlie Sheen as Tom Logan (uncredited)
- Debra Wilson as Oprah Winfrey
- James Earl Jones as Narrator / Himself
- Holly Madison, Bridget Marquardt and Kendra Wilkinson as girls in Tom's bed
- Lil Jon as himself
- Fabolous as himself/gunman
- Chingy as himself
- Crystal Lowe as Chingy's girl
- Bubba Sparxxx as hoodlum
- Bone Crusher as hoodlum
- YoungBloodZ as themselves
- Michael McDonald as Tiffany Stone (crossdressing boxer)

== Release ==
=== Home media ===
The film was released on DVD on August 15, 2006, in theatrical (83 minutes), and unrated (89 minutes) editions with deleted scenes, bloopers, and outtakes. About 1,581,754 units were sold, bringing in $22,308,989 in revenue.

== Reception ==
=== Box office ===
In its opening weekend, the film grossed a total of $40.2 million, the third best opening weekend of the Scary Movie franchise. It has the best Easter weekend opening weekend ever, beating Panic Room which made $30.1 million in its opening and also the second best April opening, only $2 million behind Anger Management's record. As of October 18, 2006, the film has grossed a total of $90,710,620 at the United States box office and $178,262,620 worldwide.

=== Critical response ===
Review aggregation website Rotten Tomatoes reports that 34% of 127 critics gave the film a positive review, with an average rating of 4.60/10. The site's consensus states, "Sure to inspire a few chuckles, but not enough to compensate for the recycled material from its predecessors." On Metacritic, film has an average of 40 out of 100, based on 23 critics, indicating "mixed or average reviews". Audiences surveyed by CinemaScore gave the film a grade "C+" on a scale of A+ to F.

Stephen Hunter of The Washington Post stated that while "Scary Movie 4 never takes you close to death by laughter [...] it's funny enough to turn the hands on your watch much more quickly than you can believe." Nathan Lee of The New York Times' described the film as being "organized on the principle of parody, not plot, [...] it's an exercise in lowbrow postmodernism, a movie-movie contraption more nuts than Charlie Kaufman's gnarliest fever dream. It's cleverly stupid."

=== Accolades ===
The film won a Golden Raspberry Award for Worst Supporting Actress (Carmen Electra, also in Date Movie).

== Sequel ==
A sequel titled Scary Movie 5, was released in 2013.

== See also ==
- List of ghost films
