= Scary Movie 5 =

2013 film by Malcolm D. Lee

- Theatrical release poster
- Directed by: Malcolm D. Lee
- Written by: Pat Proft; David Zucker
- Based on: Characters by: Shawn Wayans; Marlon Wayans; Buddy Johnson; Phil Beauman; Jason Friedberg Aaron Seltzer
- Produced by: David Zucker; Phil Dornfeld
- Starring: Ashley Tisdale; Simon Rex; Erica Ash; Katrina Bowden; Terry Crews; Heather Locklear; J. P. Manoux; Mac Miller; Jerry O'Connell; Molly Shannon; Snoop Dogg; Kate Walsh; Katt Williams
- Cinematography: Steven Douglas Smith
- Edited by: Sam Seig
- Music by: James L. Venable
- Production companies: Brad Grey Pictures; DZE
- Distributed by: Dimension Films
- Release date: April 12, 2013
- Running time: 86 minutes
- Country: United States
- Language: English
- Budget: $20 million
- Box office: $78.4 million

Scary Movie 5 (stylized as Scary MoVie) is a 2013 American parody film directed by Malcolm D. Lee and written by David Zucker and Pat Proft. It is the standalone sequel to Scary Movie 4 (2006) and the fifth installment in the Scary Movie film series. It is the second and last film in the series to be distributed by The Weinstein Company, as well as the only one not to involve Miramax Films. The film stars Ashley Tisdale, Simon Rex, Erica Ash, Katrina Bowden, Terry Crews, Heather Locklear, J. P. Manoux, Mac Miller, Jerry O'Connell, Molly Shannon, Snoop Dogg, Kate Walsh and Katt Williams. The film is the only installment of the franchise not to feature Cindy Campbell (played by Anna Faris) and Brenda Meeks (Regina Hall).

Scary Movie 5 premiered on April 11, at the Hollywood's ArcLight Cinerama Dome, and was theatrically released by Dimension Films on April 12, 2013. The film was unanimously panned by critics, and grossed $78.4 million, making it the worst-reviewed and lowest-grossing film in the Scary Movie series.

A sixth film, titled Scary Movie, was released in June 2026, with the Wayans brothers, Faris, and Hall returning.

== Plot ==
Charlie Sanders and his girlfriend Lindsay get together to make a sex tape with over 20 cameras in his room. They do all sorts of bedroom antics, including gymnastics, riding a horse, and having clowns jump in. Charlie is pulled into the air by a paranormal force and thrown against walls, shelves, and doors until he lands on the bed again.

Frightened, Lindsay decides to go home when she also flies into the air; becoming possessed she throws Charlie into the camera, killing him. The text explains that Charlie's body was found that day, but he did not stop partying until days later and that his three children were found missing. Lindsay was arrested again, and a reward was put out for the missing children.

Several months later, Ja'Marcus and D'Andre are walking in the Humboldt County woods in California, searching for cannabis to steal. Afterwards, they hide in a cabin in the woods. Inside, they see three strange creatures, later confirmed to be Charlie's children, and turn them in for the reward. Charlie's children are placed in isolation at a child development research center for a few months until they are deemed well enough to be returned to familial custody.

Charlie's estranged brother Dan Sanders and his wife Jody come for them. They are given the children under the condition of moving into a large suburban middle-class home fitted with security cameras. She is reluctant to take them at first but soon adapts. In an attempt to bond with their new children, Jody auditions for a ballet performance, Swan Lake, and is given the lead, the Swan Queen.

Meanwhile, a continuing pattern of bizarre paranormal activities in the Sanders' new home makes them investigate further. They eventually learn from the children that the attacks are by "Mama", their biological mother, who is under a curse and wants them back to sacrifice both herself and the children. Maria, the Hispanic live-in maid and housekeeper, is frightened and keeps trying various rituals, Catholic and otherwise, to ward off the house's evil spirits.

During the day, Dan is frustrated with the modest progress of his test subjects at a primate intelligence research facility; ironically, he is not bright enough to realize that the chimpanzee Caesar is now actually much smarter than he is. One night, the pool drain invites others to a party.

In the morning, after seeing the mess in the pool, Maria does more rituals, prompting Dan to fire her. As he does not understand her Spanish, their fighting leads to the lab releasing all of the apes. Jody and Dan, with the help of Jody's close friend Kendra Brooks who she knows from ballet, must quickly find a way to lift the curse and save their family. Along the way, they seek help from psychic Blaine Fulda, a complete fraud, and dream extractor Dom Kolb. He helps them understand that the solution to their problems lies in the mysterious book called Book of the Evil.

However, Jody and Kendra are oblivious to the book's power, wreaking havoc on the four friends. They take turns reading the book's two passages: one that unleashes demons, "gort klaatu barada nikto", and the other that frees them from possession. When "Mama" takes the children to a cliff to sacrifice them, Jody fails to lift the curse with the book but manages to send her falling down the cliff, but manages to survive by landing on the pool of Ja'Marcus and D'Andre's yacht, where she is devoured alive by a shark.

Realizing the love for her adopted children is all she needs, Jody gives the Swan Queen part to Kendra, who performs the dance in the style of a stripper. The audience applauds enthusiastically, including Jody, Dan, the children, Kendra's family, and Madea. In the end, Caesar, revealed to have been narrating the film, tells the audience that apes will eventually take over and humans should enjoy the time they have on the Earth.

== Cast ==
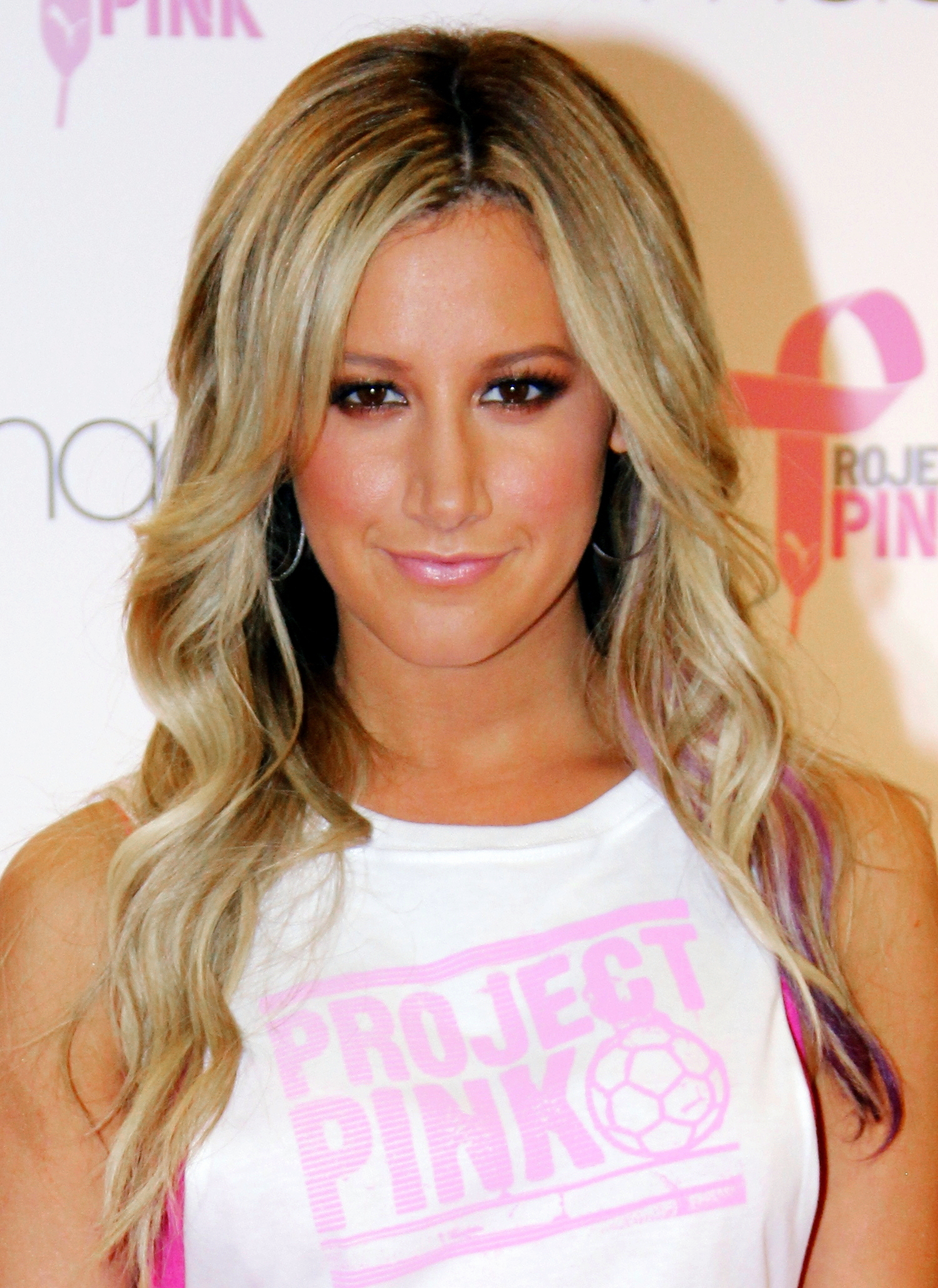
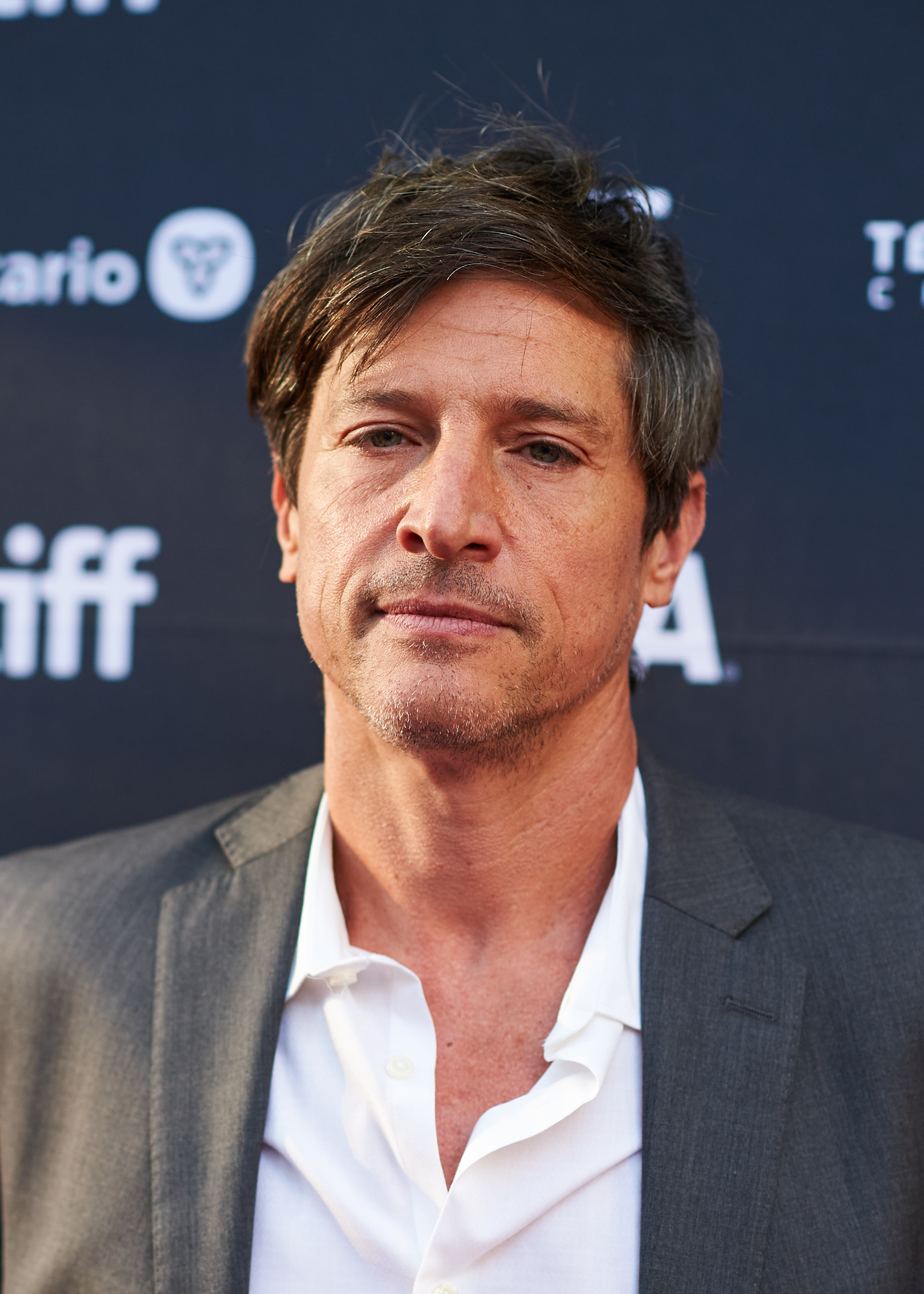
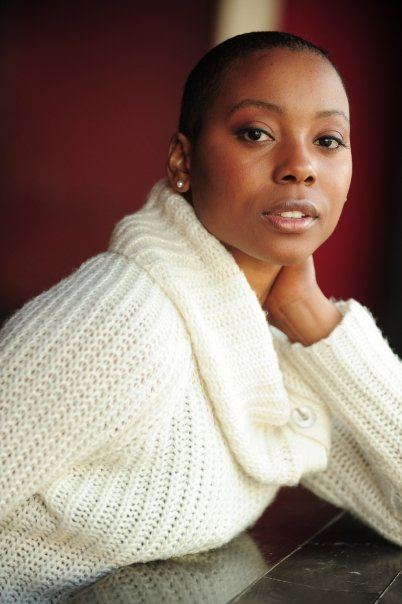
Ashley Tisdale (left) and Erica Ash (right) star in the film, replacing both Anna Faris and Regina Hall from the first four films in the franchise. Simon Rex (center) does not reprise his role from the previous two entries, instead playing a different character.
- Ashley Tisdale as Jody Sanders, the adoptive mother of Charlie's children
- Simon Rex as Dan Sanders, Jody's husband and the adoptive father of Charlie's children
- Erica Ash as Kendra Brooks, Jody's close friend
- Gracie Whitton as Kathy Sanders, one of Charlie's feral children
- Ava Kolker as Lily Sanders, one of Charlie's feral children
- Lidia Porto as Maria, Dan and Jody's Spanish housekeeper
- Charlie Sheen as Charlie Sanders, Dan's brother
- Lindsay Lohan as a fictionalized version of herself
- Terry Crews as Martin
- Jasmine Guy as Mrs. Brooks
- Darrell Hammond as Dr. Hall
- Heather Locklear as Barbara
- J. P. Manoux as Pierre
- Mac Miller as D'Andre
- Sarah Hyland as Mia, one of the residents in the cabin
- Tyler Posey as David, one of the residents in the cabin
- Bow Wow as Eric, one of the residents in the cabin
- Katrina Bowden as Natalie, one of the residents in the cabin
- Jerry O'Connell as Christian Grey
- Molly Shannon as Heather Darcy
- Snoop Dogg as Ja'Marcus
- Mike Tyson as himself
- Usher as Ira, the Janitor
- Kate Walsh as Mal Colb
- Katt Williams as Blaine Fulda, the psychic
- Lil Duval as Brooks
- Angie Stone as Kendra's Cousin
- Lewis Thompson as Mabel "Madea" Simmons
- Big Ang as herself
- Shereé Whitfield as herself
- Josh Robert Thompson as the voice of Caesar, Dan's intelligent chimpanzee who narrates the film

== Parodies ==
The main films parodied in Scary Movie 5 include:

- Paranormal Activity
- Black Swan
- Mama
- Rise of the Planet of the Apes

Other films parodied are Sinister, Inception, Ted (only in the unrated cut), Evil Dead (which was released a week prior to the film), The Cabin in the Woods, Insidious and The Help.

== Production ==
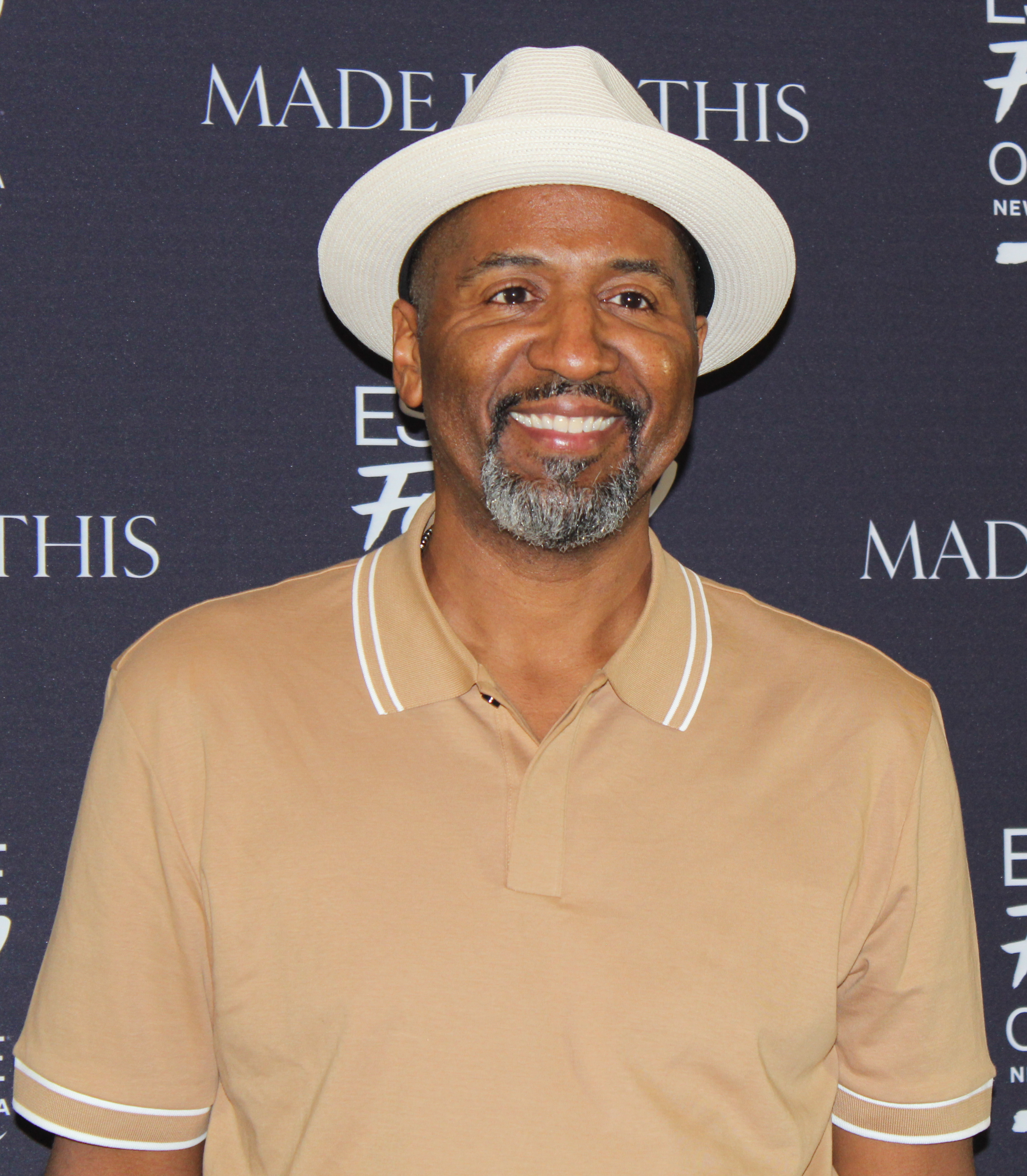
Malcolm D. Lee (photo from 2025), director for Scary Movie 5.

After completing filming on the movie A Haunted House, Marlon Wayans, former co-star and collaborator of the first two Scary Movie films, received an offer from The Weinstein Company to buy the film rights. According to Wayans, The Weinstein Company's ultimate intention was to buy and then shelve the film in order to use the ideas for Scary Movie 5. The offer, however, was ultimately rejected, and A Haunted House premiered in theaters in 2013.

The film was directed by Malcolm D. Lee and co-written and co-produced by David Zucker, who previously directed Scary Movie 3 (2003) and Scary Movie 4 (2006). Anna Faris, who starred in the previous films in the franchise, confirmed that she would not return for the fifth film. Ashley Tisdale's involvement in the film was confirmed in June 2012.

Lindsay Lohan and Charlie Sheen joined the cast in August 2012. Terry Crews joined the cast on August 14, 2012.

Filming began in September 2012. The first promotional image of the film, featuring Lohan and Sheen in the very first scene of the movie, was released on September 20, 2012.

The only actors from any of the previous installments to appear in this film are Sheen, Simon Rex, Molly Shannon, and Darrell Hammond. They do not portray their original characters, Sheen plays Charlie Sanders, Rex plays Dan Sanders, Shannon plays Heather Darcy, and Hammond plays Dr. Hall. Faris was never asked to appear in the film, while Regina Hall declined to return without Faris.

The film was largely shot in and around Atlanta, Georgia in the fall of 2012, with additional filming January and February 2013 at Sunset Gower Studios in Los Angeles. Zucker reportedly handled additional filming and reshoots while Lee was starting production for The Best Man Holiday (2013).

== Music ==
Scary Movie 5: Original Motion Picture Soundtrack

Soundtrack album by Various Artists
- Released: April 23, 2013
- Recorded: 2013
- Genre: Film soundtrack
- Length: 44:34
- Label: Lakeshore Records

Scary Movie 5: Original Motion Picture Soundtrack is the soundtrack of the film and was released on April 23, 2013.

No.	Title	Performer(s)	Length
1.	"Werk Me"	Hyper Crush	3:50
2.	"Way Out Willie"	Dug	2:19
3.	"I Want Her"	Blind Truth & Georgia Harris	3:04
4.	"How You Girlz Git Down"	Marcus Latief Scott	3:40
5.	"Everybody Feel It"	Hit Feeling Productions	3:22
6.	"Electricity"	John Costello	1:47
7.	"Lakme – Flower Duet"	Apollo Symphony Orchestra	3:28
8.	"Thunder"	The League	4:15
9.	"Pimp Cup"	Tarik NuClothes	2:12
10.	"Right There"	Bellringer	3:35
11.	"Livin' Loud"	D.J. FiFi	3:33
12.	"Swan Lake (Waltz Act 1)"	Yuri Botnari	2:59
13.	"Somewhere in This World"	Pete Peterkin	3:15
14.	"Ready for War"	MicLordz & Sauce Funky	3:14
Total length:			44:34

Scary Movie 5: Original Motion Picture Score

Film score by James L. Venable
- Released: May 14, 2013
- Recorded: 2013
- Genre: Score
- Label: Lakeshore Records

James L. Venable film scores chronology
Justice League: Crisis on Two Earths (2010)	Scary Movie 5: Original Motion Picture Score (2013)	Jay & Silent Bob's Super Groovy Cartoon Movie (2013)

Scary Movie 5: Original Motion Picture Score is the soundtrack of the film scored by James L. Venable it was released on May 14, 2013. All songs were written and composed by Venable.

== Home media ==
Scary Movie 5 was released on DVD and Blu-ray on August 20, 2013. An unrated version was also released.

== Reception ==
=== Box office ===
Scary Movie 5 grossed $32 million in North America and $46.4 million in other countries, for a worldwide total of $78.4 million. In North America, the film opened to #2 in its first weekend with $14.2 million, behind 42, making it the lowest-grossing opening weekend for a film in the Scary Movie franchise.

It was expected to take in about half as much as its predecessors, around $17 million in its opening weekend. The film held up reasonably well in its second weekend, slipping two spots to #4 with an estimated $6,296,000. In its third weekend, the film dipped 43.8% to #7 earning an estimated $3,457,000. The film held a spot in the top ten for the fourth weekend in a row, falling to #9 with a gross of $1,441,360. Scary Movie 5 fell to #13 in its fifth weekend earning $675,942 and slid to #15 in its sixth with $420,253.

=== Critical response ===
The film was not screened in advance for critics. On the review aggregator website Rotten Tomatoes, 4% of 51 critics' reviews are positive, with an average rating of 2.3/10. The website's consensus reads: "Juvenile even by Scary Movie standards, this fifth installment offers stale pop culture gags that generate few laughs." Metacritic, which uses a weighted average, assigned the film a score of 11 out of 100, based on 16 critics, indicating "overwhelming dislike". Audiences surveyed by CinemaScore gave the film a grade "C−" on a scale of A+ to F.

IGN gave the film a 1.0 out of 10. Stephanie Merry of The Washington Post gave the film zero stars saying, "The movie is so appalling that even a film fan who guffawed her way through The Aristocrats would feel nothing but a deep emptiness as the end credits begin to roll, wondering if one solid joke was too much to ask from a movie that bills itself as comedy."

Joe Neumaier of The New York Daily News gave the film one star saying, "Like so much of this whole series – hatched in 2000 by the Wayans brothers and intermittently directed by Airplane! veteran David Zucker, though newcomer Malcolm D. Lee takes over here – the mere mention of a familiar pop culture figure or title is supposed to be hilarious. It often isn't, and in fact the constant name-dropping and gross-out humor gets tiresome (in a movie that's at least 10 minutes too long). Luckily, folks like Snoop and good sports like Sheen and, yes, Lohan, break up the monotony. Until, like an undead beastie, the boredom and dumb jokes come roaring back."

Rafer Guzman of Newsday felt that "Even the talented people – comedian Katt Williams as a fake psychic, high-energy actor Jerry O'Connell in a send-up of the 'Fifty Shades of Grey' books – get chewed up and spit out by this relentless anti-laugh machine. Scary Movie 5 doesn't even have the imagination for a worthwhile gross-out joke. When the best you can offer is a poopy toothbrush, it's time to pack it in." Darren Franich of Entertainment Weekly said "Hitting theaters seven years after the last Scary Movie, the new film doesn't even feature the ameliorating presence of Anna Faris, who gave the earlier films a certain spoofy grace. In her place is High School Musical refugee Ashley Tisdale, her face frozen in an eye roll of mild irritation. Who can blame her? The film hopscotches between too-late riffs on Rise of the Planet of the Apes, Inception, Insidious, and Black Swan. At a running time of 86 minutes, it's about as long as an episode of Saturday Night Live, except with less laughs and worse storytelling." Frank Scheck of The Hollywood Reporter said "The filmmakers' desperation is evident from the fact that a good chunk of the running time is devoted to spoofing the recent Jessica Chastain starrer Mama. While that film was indeed a sleeper hit, it hardly seems memorable enough to warrant such sustained treatment, and indeed the comic payoffs are nil."

The film earned three nominations at the 34th Golden Raspberry Awards including Worst Supporting Actress for Lindsay Lohan, Worst Screen Combo for Lohan and Charlie Sheen and Worst Prequel, Remake, Ripoff or Sequel.

Director Malcolm D. Lee was very critical of the movie: "It was just a bad movie. Believe me. Don't bother going to see that movie. Or renting it, or anything. It's not worth your time".

== Sequel ==
A spiritual sequel to the first two films, Scary Movie, was released in June 2026, with the Wayans brothers' involvement and the original actors reprising their roles.

== See also ==
- American films of 2013
- List of comedy films of the 2010s
- List of ghost films
- List of horror films of the 2010s
- Parody film
