= Marny Eng =

Canadian stuntwoman

Marny Eng (sometimes credited as Marney Eng, Marnie Eng or Marni Eng) is a Canadian stuntwoman and stunt coordinator who has performed stunts in well over 100 films since the early 1990s. She has been the stunt double for numerous famous actresses such as Lucy Liu, Christina Ricci, Kristin Kreuk, Rachael Leigh Cook and Reese Witherspoon. As an actress, she is most famous for portraying Tabitha, the Samara Morgan parody from Scary Movie 3. In 2015, she received the UBCP/ACTRA Lorena Gale Woman of Distinction Award.

== Biography ==
Marny Eng was born in 1969 in Port Alberni, British Columbia. She learned gymnastics as a child, winning junior class British Columbia gymnastics championships. She then trained at the US National Academy of Artistic Gymnastics in Eugene, Oregon, before completing a degree in exercise science at the University of British Columbia.

Eng is a member of Stunts Canada and moved from executive member to president for 2015.

In 2022, Eng and E.J. Foerster collaborated as co-directors of the film Gringa, which won the Audience Award at the 2022 Whistler Film Festival.
