= Scary Movie (film series) =

American parody film series

- Official film series logo
- Created by: Shawn Wayans; Marlon Wayans; Buddy Johnson; Phil Beauman
- Owners: Miramax (2000–06; 2026–present); The Weinstein Company (2006–13)
- Years: 2000–present

Films and television
- Film(s): Scary Movie (2000); Scary Movie 2 (2001); Scary Movie 3 (2003); Scary Movie 4 (2006); Scary Movie 5 (2013); Scary Movie (2026)

Scary Movie is an American parody film series that primarily spoofs horror films and other popular culture. The films have collectively grossed $1 billion at the worldwide box office.

== Films ==
Film	U.S. release date	Director(s)	Screenwriter(s)	Story by	Producer(s)
Scary Movie	July 7, 2000	Keenen Ivory Wayans	Shawn Wayans, Marlon Wayans, Buddy Johnson, Phil Beauman & Jason Friedberg and Aaron Seltzer		Eric L. Gold, Lee R. Mayes, Bo Zenga
Scary Movie 2	July 4, 2001	Keenen Ivory Wayans	Shawn Wayans, Marlon Wayans, Alyson Fouse, Greg Grabianski, Dave Polsky, Michael Anthony Snowden & Craig Wayans		Eric L. Gold
Scary Movie 3	October 24, 2003	David Zucker	Craig Mazin & Pat Proft	Craig Mazin & Pat Proft	Robert K. Weiss
Scary Movie 4	April 14, 2006	David Zucker	Craig Mazin & Jim Abrahams & Pat Proft	Craig Mazin	Robert K. Weiss and Craig Mazin
Scary Movie 5	April 12, 2013	Malcolm D. Lee	David Zucker & Pat Proft	David Zucker & Pat Proft	David Zucker and Phil Dornfeld
Scary Movie	June 5, 2026	Michael Tiddes	Marlon Wayans & Shawn Wayans & Keenen Ivory Wayans & Rick Alvarez		Marlon Wayans, Shawn Wayans, Keenen Ivory Wayans, Craig Wayans, Rick Alvarez

=== Scary Movie (2000) ===
Scary Movie is the first film of the franchise and directed by Keenen Ivory Wayans. It is the highest-grossing film of the franchise, with $278,019,771 worldwide.

The film's plot mainly spoofs the slasher film genre, most notably the Scream and I Know What You Did Last Summer franchises, and it follows a group of clueless teenagers, led by the lovable, but dim-witted Cindy Campbell, who are stalked by a bumbling Ghostface-esque serial killer one year after disposing of the body of a man they accidentally hit with their car.

=== Scary Movie 2 (2001) ===
Scary Movie 2 is the second film of the franchise and was also directed by Wayans. It grossed $141,220,678 worldwide and is the second lowest-grossing film of the franchise. This is the last film to receive an R-rating and also marked the end of the Wayans siblings' involvement with the franchise, until the development of the sixth film.

The film is a parody of supernatural films, most notably The Haunting (1999), with the plot following a perverted college professor who tricks a group of unsuspecting students, including Cindy and her friends, into visiting a haunted mansion for a fake sleep-disorder study, using them as bait to capture a ghostly menace.

=== Scary Movie 3 (2003) ===
Scary Movie 3 is the third film of the franchise and was directed by David Zucker. With $220,673,217 earned worldwide, it is the second highest-grossing film in the franchise. This was the first Scary Movie film to receive a PG-13 rating, as well as the first film to have no involvement from the Wayans family.

Michael Jackson planned to sue the filmmakers for Edward Moss parodying him in such a way that made him seem like a child molester and having a fake nose.

The plot of the film is a spoof of the films Signs and The Ring (both 2002). It follows Cindy, now a TV reporter, as she investigates a cursed videotape that kills viewers in seven days while uncovering a link to mysterious crop circles and an impending alien invasion. To save the world, she must team up with the clueless U.S. President and two local farmer brothers to stop the supernatural and extraterrestrial threats before her time runs out.

=== Scary Movie 4 (2006) ===
Scary Movie 4 is the fourth film of the franchise and was also directed by Zucker. With $178,710,620 at the worldwide box office, it ranks as the franchise's third highest-grossing film.

The film's main targets of spoofs were The Grudge (2004), War of the Worlds (2005), The Village (2004) and the Saw franchise. The film follows Cindy as she discovers her new house, where she works as a caretaker, is haunted by a ghostly boy, forcing her to team up with her clueless neighbor to save the world from an invasion of alien "Tr-iPods".

=== Scary Movie 5 (2013) ===
Scary Movie 5 is the fifth film of the franchise and was directed by Malcolm D. Lee. It is the only film in the franchise to not star Anna Faris and Regina Hall. It grossed $78,613,981 worldwide and became the lowest-grossing film of the franchise.

The Paranormal Activity films, Mama (2013), Black Swan (2010) and Rise of the Planet of the Apes (2011) are primarily parodied, and follows a young couple who, after adopting three feral children, must use home surveillance cameras and supernatural experts to battle a malevolent demon haunting their home.

=== Scary Movie (2026) ===
In April 2024, it was announced that a new film was in development, with producer Neal H. Moritz attached to the project. Production was financed entirely by Miramax, while Paramount Pictures distributed the movie. In October 2024, it was confirmed that the Wayans brothers would reunite for the first time in 18 years to develop the new film. It was the first film in the series not to be produced by Dimension Films, due to the company being shut down on July 16, 2018 following The Weinstein Company's liquidation, and the second film in the series to be produced by Miramax. In August 2025, Regina Hall and Anna Faris were confirmed to reprise their roles as Brenda Meeks and Cindy Campbell, respectively. The film began filming in October 2025 and was released on June 5, 2026, after previously being slated to release on June 12.

== Recurring cast and characters ==
List indicators

This section includes characters who will appear or have appeared in two or more films in the series.

- An empty grey cell indicates the character was not in the film, or that the character's official presence has not yet been confirmed.
- ^{C} indicates a cameo role.
- ^{P} indicates an appearance in onscreen photographs.
- ^{U} indicates an uncredited appearance.
- ^{V} indicates a voice-only role.

Cast members	Films					
Cast members	Scary Movie	Scary Movie 2	Scary Movie 3	Scary Movie 4	Scary Movie 5	Scary Movie
Cast members	2000	2001	2003	2006	2013	2026
Anna Faris	Cindy Campbell	Cindy Campbell	Cindy Campbell	Cindy Campbell		Cindy Campbell
Regina Hall	Brenda Meeks	Brenda Meeks	Brenda Meeks	Brenda Meeks		Brenda Meeks
Marlon Wayans	Shorty Meeks	Shorty Meeks				Shorty Meeks Joe Jackson Tiffany Wilson Count Brolock
Shawn Wayans	Ray Wilkins	Ray Wilkins				Ray Wilkins
Carmen Electra	Drew Decker			Holly		Bartender^{C}
Jon Abrahams	Bobby Prinze					Bobby Prinze^{C}
Lochlyn Munro	Greg Phillippe					Greg Phillippe
Dave Sheridan	Doofy Gilmore / The Killer					Doofy Gilmore / Ghostface^{V}
Cheri Oteri	Gail Hailstorm					Gail Hailstorm
Chris Elliott		Hanson		Ezekiel		Shorthands
Charlie Sheen			Tom Logan	Tom Logan^{C}^{U}	Charlie Sanders	
Simon Rex			George Logan	George Logan^{C}	Dan Sanders	
Anthony Anderson			Mahalik Phifer	Mahalik Phifer		Himself
Kevin Hart			CJ Iz	CJ Iz		
Leslie Nielsen			President Baxter Harris	President Baxter Harris		
Drew Mikuska			Cody Campbell	Cody Campbell^{P}		
Darrell Hammond			Father Muldoon		Dr. Hall	
Edward Moss			Michael Jackson	Michael Jackson		
Molly Shannon				Marilyn	Heather Darcy	
Shaquille O'Neal				Himself		Himself

== Additional crew and production details ==
Film	Crew/Detail					
Film	Cinematographer	Editor(s)	Composer	Production companies	Distributing companies	Running time
Scary Movie (2000)	Francis Kenny	Mark Helfrich	David Kitay	Wayans Bros. Entertainment, Gold/Miller Productions, Brad Grey Pictures	Miramax Films	88 minutes
Scary Movie 2 (2001)	Steven Berstein	Tom Nordberg, Richard Pearson & Peter Teschner		Wayans Bros. Entertainment, Gold/Miller Productions, Brad Grey Pictures	Dimension Films	82 minutes
Scary Movie 3 (2003)	Mark Irwin	Jon Poll	James L. Venable	Brad Grey Pictures	Dimension Films	86 minutes
Scary Movie 4 (2006)	Thomas E. Ackerman	Craig Herring & Tom Lewis	James L. Venable	Dimension Films, Miramax Films, Brad Grey Pictures	The Weinstein Company	84 minutes
Scary Movie 5 (2013)	Steven Douglas Smith	Sam Seig	James L. Venable	Brad Grey Pictures, DZE	Dimension Films	86 minutes
Scary Movie (2026)	Terry Stacey	Jonathan Schwartz	Haim Mazar	Miramax, Wayans Bros. Entertainment	Paramount Pictures	96 minutes

== Production ==
=== Parodies ===
Scary Movie's (2000) main parodies are of Scream (1996) and I Know What You Did Last Summer (1997). The rest of its elements are from The Exorcist (1973), The Shining (1980), Kazaam (1996), Election (1999), Buffy the Vampire Slayer (1997–2003), The Matrix (1999), The Blair Witch Project (1999), and The Sixth Sense (1999).

Scary Movie 2's primary target is The Haunting (1999). The rest of the film contains traces parodies of House on Haunted Hill (1959) and its 1999 remake, The Legend of Hell House (1973), The Exorcist (1973), The Rocky Horror Picture Show (1975), The Amityville Horror (1979), The Changeling (1980), Poltergeist (1982), Bloodbath at the House of Death (1984), Titanic (1997), I Still Know What You Did Last Summer (1998), Stigmata (1999), What Lies Beneath (2000), Hollow Man (2000), Charlie's Angels (2000), Dude, Where's My Car? (2000), and Hannibal (2001).

Scary Movie 3's general parodies are of Signs (2002) and The Ring (2002). It also features elements of The Texas Chain Saw Massacre (1974), Airplane! (1980), The Others (2001), Minority Report (2002), 8 Mile (2002), and The Matrix Reloaded (2003).

Scary Movie 4's parodies are of The Village (2004), The Grudge (2004), the Saw franchise (2004–present), and War of the Worlds (2005). It also parodies Million Dollar Baby (2004) and Brokeback Mountain (2005).

Scary Movie 5's central areas of satire are the Paranormal Activity films (2007–present), Black Swan (2010), Rise of the Planet of the Apes (2011), and Mama (2013). Other notable parodies are those of the Madea films (2005–present), Inception (2010), Fifty Shades of Grey (2011), The Cabin in the Woods (2011), Sinister, Ted (both 2012), and Evil Dead (2013).

Scary Movie's (2026) primary parody is once again Scream, while parodies of Get Out (2017), Nope (2022), M3GAN (2022), Longlegs (2024), Heretic (2024), Sinners (2025), and Weapons (2025) are featured throughout.

== Reception ==
=== Box office ===
Film	Release date	Grosses			Budget
Film	Release date	Domestic	International	Worldwide	Budget
Scary Movie (2000)	July 7, 2000	$157,019,771	$121,000,000	$278,019,771	$19 million
Scary Movie 2	July 4, 2001	$71,308,997	$69,911,681	$141,220,678	$45 million
Scary Movie 3	October 24, 2003	$110,003,217	$110,670,000	$220,673,217	$48 million
Scary Movie 4	April 14, 2006	$90,710,620	$88,000,000	$178,710,620	$40 million
Scary Movie 5	April 12, 2013	$32,015,787	$46,598,194	$78,613,981	$20 million
Scary Movie (2026)	June 5, 2026	$108,277,762	$123,189,689	$231,467,451	$30 million
Total		$569,336,154	$559,369,564	$1,128,705,718	$202 million

=== Critical response ===
Film	Rotten Tomatoes	Metacritic	CinemaScore
Scary Movie (2000)	52% (122 reviews)	48 (32 critic reviews)	B−
Scary Movie 2	13% (110 reviews)	29 (25 critic reviews)	B
Scary Movie 3	35% (127 reviews)	49 (27 critic reviews)	B
Scary Movie 4	34% (127 reviews)	40 (23 critic reviews)	C+
Scary Movie 5	4% (51 reviews)	11 (16 critic reviews)	C−
Scary Movie (2026)	23% (134 reviews)	38 (27 critic reviews)	C+

=== Awards ===
Film	Award	Category	Recipient(s)	Result
Scary Movie (2000)	2000 Stinkers Bad Movie Award	Most Unfunny Comic Relief	90% of the film	Nominated
Scary Movie (2000)	2000 Stinkers Bad Movie Award	Worst Supporting Actress	Shannon Elizabeth	Nominated
Scary Movie (2000)	2001 Taurus World Stunt Award	Best Work with a Vehicle	Leslie McMichael and Yves Cameron	Nominated
Scary Movie (2000)	2000 Teen Choice Award	Film - Movie of the Summer	Film - Movie of the Summer	Won
Scary Movie (2000)	2001 Blockbuster Entertainment Award	Favorite Actor - Comedy	Marlon Wayans	Nominated
Scary Movie (2000)	2001 Blockbuster Entertainment Award	Favorite Actor - Comedy	Shawn Wayans	Nominated
Scary Movie (2000)	2001 Blockbuster Entertainment Award	Favorite Supporting Actress - Comedy	Cheri Oteri	Won
Scary Movie (2000)	2001 MTV Movie Award	Breakthrough Female Performance	Anna Faris	Nominated
Scary Movie (2000)	2001 MTV Movie Award	Best Kiss	Anna Faris and Jon Abrahams	Nominated
Scary Movie (2000)	2001 MTV Movie Award	Best Cameo in a Movie	James Van Der Beek	Won
Scary Movie 2	2001 Golden Schmoes Award	Worst Movie of the Year	Worst Movie of the Year	Nominated
Scary Movie 2	2001 Stinkers Bad Movie Award	Most Painfully Unfunny Comedy	Most Painfully Unfunny Comedy	Nominated
Scary Movie 2	2001 Stinkers Bad Movie Award	Worst Supporting Actress	Tori Spelling	Won
Scary Movie 2	2001 Teen Choice Award	Film - Choice Movie of the Summer	Film - Choice Movie of the Summer	Nominated
Scary Movie 2	2001 Teen Choice Award	Film - Choice Movie Your Parents Didn't Want You to See	Film - Choice Movie Your Parents Didn't Want You to See	Won
Scary Movie 2	2002 ALMA Award	Excellence in Make-Up in Television and Film	Rebecca DeHerrera	Nominated
Scary Movie 3	2003 Stinker Bad Movie Award	Most Painfully Unfunny Comedy	Most Painfully Unfunny Comedy	Nominated
Scary Movie 3	2003 Stinker Bad Movie Award	Worst Screenplay for a Film Grossing More than $100 Million Using Hollywood Math	Craig Mazin and Pat Proft	Nominated
Scary Movie 3	2004 Kids' Choice Award	Favorite Movie Actress	Queen Latifah (also for Bringing Down the House)	Nominated
Scary Movie 3	2004 MTV Movie Award	Best Cameo	Simon Cowell	Won
Scary Movie 3	2004 Teen Choice Award	Film - Choice Movie Your Parents Didn't Want You to See	Film - Choice Movie Your Parents Didn't Want You to See	Nominated
Scary Movie 4	2006 Fangoria Chainsaw Award	Chick You Don't Wanna Mess With (Best Heroine)	Anna Faris	Nominated
Scary Movie 4	2006 Stinker Bad Movie Award	Worst Sequel	Worst Sequel	Nominated
Scary Movie 4	2006 Teen Choice Award	Movies - Choice Comedy	Movies - Choice Comedy	Nominated
Scary Movie 4	2007 Razzie Award	Worst Supporting Actress	Carmen Electra (also for Date Movie)	Won
Scary Movie 5	2013 Golden Schmoes Award	Worst Movie of the Year	Worst Movie of the Year	Nominated
Scary Movie 5	2014 Razzie Award	Worst Supporting Actress	Lindsay Lohan	Nominated
Scary Movie 5	2014 Razzie Award	Worst Screen Combo	Charlie Sheen and Lindsay Lohan	Nominated
Scary Movie 5	2014 Razzie Award	Worst Remake, Rip-Off or Sequel	Worst Remake, Rip-Off or Sequel	Nominated
Scary Movie (2026)	2026 Fangoria Chainsaw Award	Best Supporting Performance	Regina Hall	Pending
