= Scary Movie 3 =

2003 film by David Zucker

- Theatrical release poster
- Directed by: David Zucker
- Written by: Craig Mazin; Pat Proft
- Based on: Characters by: Shawn Wayans; Marlon Wayans; Buddy Johnson; Phil Beauman; Jason Friedberg Aaron Seltzer
- Produced by: Robert K. Weiss
- Starring: Anna Faris; Anthony Anderson; Kevin Hart; Leslie Nielsen; Camryn Manheim; Simon Rex; George Carlin; Queen Latifah; Eddie Griffin; Denise Richards; Regina Hall; Charlie Sheen
- Cinematography: Mark Irwin
- Edited by: Jon Poll
- Music by: James L. Venable
- Production company: Brad Grey Pictures
- Distributed by: Dimension Films
- Release dates: October 20, 2003 (AMC Avco Cinemas); October 24, 2003 (United States)
- Running time: 84 minutes
- Country: United States
- Language: English
- Budget: $45–48 million
- Box office: $220.7 million

Scary Movie 3 is a 2003 American parody film directed by David Zucker and written by Craig Mazin and Pat Proft. It is the sequel to Scary Movie 2 (2001) and the third installment in the Scary Movie film series. The film stars Anna Faris and Regina Hall reprising their roles as Cindy Campbell and Brenda Meeks, alongside new cast members Charlie Sheen, Simon Rex, Anthony Anderson, Kevin Hart, Queen Latifah, and Leslie Nielsen. It is the first film in the series without the involvement of the Wayans family.

Set primarily in Washington, the film parodies a number of early 2000s films, including The Ring (2002), Signs (2002), The Matrix Reloaded (2003), and 8 Mile (2002). The story incorporates elements of the horror, science fiction, and mystery genres. Principal photography took place in Vancouver, British Columbia. Mark Irwin served as cinematographer, and the score was composed by James L. Venable.

Scary Movie 3 premiered at the AMC Avco Cinemas in Westwood, California on October 20, 2003, and was released in the United States on October 24, by Dimension Films. The film received mixed reviews from critics, but grossed $220.7 million worldwide on a $45–48 million budget. A sequel, Scary Movie 4, was released in 2006. At the 2004 Teen Choice Awards, Scary Movie 3 won the award for Choice Movie: Your Parents Didn't Want You to See.

== Plot ==
High schoolers Becca Kotler and Katie Embry discuss a cursed videotape that allegedly causes the death of anyone who watches it within seven days. After they both watch the tape, an unseen entity kills them. On a farm outside Washington, D.C., widowed pastor Tom Logan and his brother George discover crop circles in their cornfield, with Tom's daughter Sue screaming in the center.

Local reporter Cindy Campbell works for 8 News, covering the crop circle phenomenon but receives little attention. She cares for her young nephew Cody, who displays precognitive abilities. While picking him up from school, Cindy meets George, who invites her and her friend Brenda Meeks to a rap battle. At the event, George impresses the crowd by defeating Fat Joe but is expelled after mistakenly wearing a white hoodie which looks like a Ku Klux Klan hood while greeting the audience.

Brenda later informs Cindy that she has watched the cursed videotape, so asks her to stay with her. After a series of pranks, Brenda is killed by the tape's entity named Tabitha. George, Mahalik, and CJ learn of Brenda's death. Meanwhile, Tom meets Sayaman, who accidentally caused his wife Annie's death in a car accident.

George and Mahalik disrupt Brenda's wake, attempting to revive her. Cindy discovers the cursed tape among Brenda's belongings, watches it, and receives a call warning her of her death. Seeking help, she contacts George, Mahalik, and CJ. CJ refers her to his aunt Shaneequa, who identifies a hidden image of a lighthouse within the tape, suggesting it holds the key to breaking the curse. While Cindy is away, Cody watches the tape, putting himself at risk.

In a further attempt to warn the public, Cindy broadcasts a warning through her news station, but her boss distorts the message. Concurrently, Tom and his family encounter an alien disguised as Michael Jackson, while U.S. president Baxter Harris arrives to investigate the crop circles.

Cindy visits the lighthouse and meets the Architect, who explains that Tabitha was his adopted daughter, a malevolent spirit who his wife drowned in a nearby well. Before her death, Tabitha transferred her evil essence into a VHS tape, which he accidentally returned to Blockbuster, releasing the curse.

Returning home, Cindy finds Cody missing and learns that the tape has been aired on live television, exposing a wide audience. She traces Cody to the Logan farm, where he has taken shelter. As chaos unfolds with global extraterrestrial sightings, Tom instructs Cindy, Sue, and Cody to hide in the basement while he, George, Mahalik, Harris and the Secret Service confront the extraterrestrials. They reveal they are peaceful and intercepted the cursed tape, mistakenly believing it to be the film Pootie Tang, and have come to Earth to stop Tabitha.

In the basement, Cindy identifies the well from the tape. Tabitha emerges and captures Cody. Cindy and George attempt to reason with her, offering her a place in their family. However, though Tabitha initially appears to accept, she attempts to attack them, only for Harris to inadvertently open the basement door and knock her back down into the well.

Following the incident, Cindy and George get married. As they depart for their honeymoon, they realize they have left Cody behind. Cindy narrowly avoids hitting him at an intersection, only for another vehicle to strike him.

== Cast ==
- Anna Faris as Cindy Campbell
- Anthony Anderson as Mahalik
- Leslie Nielsen as President Baxter Harris
- Camryn Manheim as Trooper Champlin
- Simon Rex as George Logan
- Pamela Anderson as Becca Kotler
- Jenny McCarthy as Katie Embry
- Darrell Hammond as Father Muldoon
- Kevin Hart as CJ Iz
- D. L. Hughley as John Wilson
- Ja Rule as Agent Thompson
- Drew Mikuska as Cody Campbell
- Jeremy Piven as Ross Giggins
- George Carlin as The Architect
- Queen Latifah as Aunt Shaneequa/The Oracle
- Eddie Griffin as Orpheus
- Denise Richards as Annie Logan
- Regina Hall as Brenda Meeks
- Charlie Sheen as Tom Logan
- Ajay Naidu as Sayaman
- Simon Cowell as himself
- Tim Stack as Carson Ward
- Diane Klimaszewski as herself
- Elaine Klimaszewski as herself
- Jianna Ballard as Sue Logan
- Marny Eng as Tabitha
- Edward Moss as Michael Jackson Alien

=== Rapper cameos ===
As well as in "The Rap Battle", several actual rappers assist in the confrontation with the aliens and a subsequent shootout amongst themselves.

- Fat Joe
- Master P
- Macy Gray
- Method Man
- Redman
- Raekwon
- The RZA
- U-God

== Production ==
After the success of Scary Movie 2, the Wayans brothers who had directed and co-written the previous Scary Movie films, pitched their idea for the third film at the same time that they were pitching the idea for the movie White Chicks. Their pitch for the third film reportedly met with approval. According to Marlon Wayans, the two parties however could not come to a deal primarily because Miramax's initial pay offer was only equal to what had been agreed upon for the first Scary Movie film, which would mean the Wayans would actually be taking a pay cut. Higher offers were then made after the White Chicks film idea was greenlit, but still below the initial pay demand that the Wayans had asked for at the start of negotiations. The Wayans brothers then chose to prioritize the White Chicks film while their pitch would then reportedly be used as the basis for the third film without their involvement.

After the Wayans left Scary Movie 3, Keenen Ivory Wayans encouraged Anna Faris not to star in the film; however, Faris was under a three-picture contract and feared the financial consequences of a potential lawsuit if she broke it. According to Anthony Anderson, he signed on to the film due to an interest in working with Marlon and Shawn because of his friendship with the family, but he had not realized that they had left the franchise prior. Anderson would later collaborate with the Wayans officially in the franchise over two decades later in the sixth film.

In November 2002, Dimension Films announced the development of a third Scary Movie installment without the involvement of the Wayans brothers. In December 2002, Kevin Smith signed on as executive producer and co-writer but later withdrew from the project. David Zucker was brought on as director. Jason Friedberg and Aaron Seltzer, who had contributed to an early draft of the original Scary Movie (2000), were initially assigned to write the script, and wrote a script initially titled Scary Movie 3: Episode I – Lord of the Brooms, with the project being intended to parody the Star Wars, The Lord of the Rings and Harry Potter franchises. Although Zucker considered using their draft, he ultimately opted for a new screenplay written by Craig Mazin and Pat Proft that aligned more closely with the tone of the earlier two films.

Principal photography began on March 12, 2003 and concluded on July 16 that same year. Filming took place in Vancouver, British Columbia in Canada.

== Music ==
The score for Scary Movie 3 was composed by James L. Venable and performed by the Hollywood Studio Symphony. The film’s original soundtrack, featuring a blend of hip hop and contemporary music, was released on October 24, 2003. It includes contributions from artists such as Buku Wise, Delinquent Habits, Dame Lee, and Kebyar. Frank Fitzpatrick served as the music supervisor, while Jorge Corante produced and co-wrote the majority of the original songs featured in the film.

== Release ==
=== Home media ===
Disney's Buena Vista Home Entertainment (under the Dimension Home Video banner) released the film on DVD and VHS on May 11, 2004. An unrated version titled Scary Movie 3.5 was released on September 30, 2005, the same day Disney finalized their sale of Dimension Films (a sublabel of Miramax) to Bob Weinstein and Harvey Weinstein, who were leaving Miramax's parent company Disney to form a new studio called The Weinstein Company. However, Disney/Miramax retained the rights to all of Dimension's films that had been released up until that point, despite the label itself becoming part of The Weinstein Company from October 1, 2005 onward. Disney eventually sold Miramax and the pre-October 2005 Dimension library to private equity firm Filmyard Holdings in December 2010.

Filmyard Holdings licensed the home media rights for several Dimension/Miramax titles to Lionsgate, and on September 20, 2011, Lionsgate Home Entertainment released the film's unrated cut on Blu-ray. On December 6, 2011, Lionsgate also released the first three Scary Movie films on a Blu-ray triple feature. In 2011, Filmyard Holdings licensed the Miramax library to streamer Netflix. This deal included Scary Movie 3, and ran for five years, eventually ending on June 1, 2016.

In March 2016, Filmyard Holdings sold Miramax to Qatari company beIN Media Group. Then in April 2020, ViacomCBS (now known as Paramount Skydance) bought a 49% stake in Miramax, which gave them the rights to the Miramax library and the pre-October 2005 Dimension library. Afterwards, Paramount began reissuing many Dimension/Miramax titles they had acquired. On February 1, 2021, Paramount Home Entertainment reissued Lionsgate's triple feature Blu-ray, also releasing it as a triple feature DVD. Paramount later made Scary Movie 3 available on their subscription streaming service Paramount+, as well as on their free streaming service Pluto TV.

== Reception ==
=== Box office ===
Scary Movie 3 opened at number one at the North American box office, grossing $48.1 million during its opening weekend and $57.5 million during its first week. It surpassed Red Dragon to have the highest October opening weekend at the time. The film earned $24.7 million in its second weekend and ultimately grossed $110 million domestically. Internationally, it grossed an additional $110.7 million, bringing its worldwide total to approximately $220.7 million. The film became the second-highest-grossing entry in the Scary Movie franchise.

=== Critical response ===
On the review aggregator website Rotten Tomatoes, 35% of 127 critics' reviews are positive, with an average rating of 5/10. The website's consensus reads: "Though an improvement over the second Scary Movie, the laughs are still inconsistent." Metacritic, which uses a weighted average, assigned the film a score of 49 out of 100, based on 27 critics, indicating "mixed or average" reviews. Audiences polled by CinemaScore gave the film a grade of "B" on an A+ to F scale.

Critics generally viewed the film as an improvement over its predecessor but criticized its uneven humor. Roger Ebert of the Chicago Sun-Times gave the film two stars out of four, criticizing it as a simpleminded spoof with less intelligent satire than the "average issue of Mad magazine". Empire wrote that the film "manages some good laughs" but criticized it for relying heavily on easy targets and repetitive slapstick.

Common Sense Media noted that while the film was "less vulgar" than the previous installments, it still contained crude humor and was best suited for older teens and adults. IGN observed that the film delivered "a handful of hilarious scenes," but ultimately described it as "hit and miss."

The BBC review praised Anna Faris' performance but concluded that the film "feels like a series of skits rather than a coherent movie." The Guardian criticized the film's "scattergun approach" to parody, suggesting it lacked the sharper satire found in more effective spoof comedies.

== Sequel ==
A sequel titled Scary Movie 4, was released in 2006, with Faris, Hall, Anderson, Hart, Nielsen, Rex, Sheen and Edward Moss reprising their roles.

== See also ==
- List of ghost films
