= Scary Movie 2 =

2001 film by Keenen Ivory Wayans

- Theatrical release poster
- Directed by: Keenen Ivory Wayans
- Written by: Shawn Wayans; Marlon Wayans; Alyson Fouse; Greg Grabianski; Dave Polsky; Michael Anthony Snowden; Craig Wayans
- Based on: Characters by: Shawn Wayans; Marlon Wayans; Buddy Johnson; Phil Beauman; Jason Friedberg Aaron Seltzer
- Produced by: Eric L. Gold
- Starring: Shawn Wayans; Marlon Wayans; Anna Faris; Regina Hall; Chris Masterson; Kathleen Robertson; David Cross; James Woods; Tim Curry; Tori Spelling; Chris Elliott
- Cinematography: Steven Bernstein
- Edited by: Tom Nordberg; Richard Pearson; Peter Teschner
- Production companies: Gold/Miller Productions; Wayans Bros. Entertainment; Brad Grey Pictures
- Distributed by: Dimension Films
- Release date: July 4, 2001 (United States)
- Running time: 82 minutes
- Country: United States
- Language: English
- Budget: $45 million
- Box office: $141.2 million

Scary Movie 2 is a 2001 American parody film directed by Keenen Ivory Wayans. It is the sequel to Scary Movie (2000) and the second installment in the Scary Movie film series. The film stars Anna Faris, Regina Hall, Shawn Wayans, and Marlon Wayans (all reprising their roles from the first film, despite their characters having been killed), as well as Tim Curry, Tori Spelling, Chris Elliott, Chris Masterson, Kathleen Robertson, David Cross, and James Woods. The film was the last in the series to feature the involvement of the Wayans family until Scary Movie (2026) twenty-five years later.

Where the original film was mainly based on the slasher films of the 1990s, Scary Movie 2 parodies an array of supernatural and haunted house films from various decades, namely The Haunting (1999), Stigmata (1999), The Exorcist (1973), The Rocky Horror Picture Show (1975), The Amityville Horror (1979), Poltergeist (1982), The Legend of Hell House (1973), House on Haunted Hill (both the 1959 and 1999 versions), The Changeling (1980), What Lies Beneath (2000), and Bloodbath at the House of Death (1984). It also spoofs the comedy film Dude, Where's My Car? (2000) and some contemporary films, such as Hannibal (2001), Hollow Man (2000), and Charlie's Angels (2000).

Scary Movie 2 was released by Dimension Films on July 4, 2001 and grossed $141 million worldwide against a $45 million budget and received largely negative reviews from critics. A sequel, Scary Movie 3, was released in 2003.

== Plot ==
At the haunted mansion Hell House, teenager Megan Voorhees becomes possessed by the spirit of Hugh Kane, the house's cruel, wicked previous owner. She interrupts a formal dinner party, thrown by her mother, who seeks help from two Roman Catholic priests, Fathers McFeely and Harris. After an unsuccessful attempt to exorcise Kane's ghost, McFeely pulls a gun and shoots Megan.

One year later, Cindy Campbell, Ray Wilkins, Brenda and Shorty Meeks are attending college, trying to live new lives after surviving the events of the first film. Cindy and Brenda are tagged by socially maladjusted Alex. Shorty is still the same stoner he was before. Ray, still confused about his sexuality, has two new male friends, Tommy and Buddy, the latter of whom becomes romantically interested in Cindy. She rebuffs him but agrees to be friends.

The sinister professor Oldman and his charming paraplegic assistant, Dwight Hartman, plan to study the paranormal activity at the Hell House. They recruit Cindy and her friends as test subjects under the pretense of a psychological experiment on sleep paralysis. At the mansion, Cindy encounters a foul-mouthed parrot named Polly, and Hanson, a creepy caretaker with a badly malformed hand. Later, the attractive Theo joins the group. They sit down for dinner but soon lose their appetite due to Hanson's repulsive handling of the food.

That night, Cindy hears voices directing her to a secret room, where she and Buddy find the diary that belongs to Kane's wife. Seeing her portrait, they note Cindy's slight resemblance. Meanwhile, the others also experience bizarre encounters: Kane has sex with Alex in her bedroom and quickly departs at the mention of commitment while Cindy gets into a fistfight with the house cat, Mr. Kittles. When Cindy tries to tell Oldman, he dismisses it and sends Theo to take Cindy to bed.

Later, Cindy is possessed by the spirit of Kane's wife, and attempts to seduce Oldman, but quickly returns to normal with no memory of the event. A toy clown attempts to kill Ray, but in a strange turn of events, the doll is molested by him instead. A monstrous weed rolls Shorty into a joint and proceeds to smoke him, much to Shorty's enjoyment, but gets distracted and lets him escape.

The next morning, Oldman tells Dwight that no one is leaving the house despite the attacks and shows his lecherous nature. Dwight is given the only house keys and told to give them to no one. Theo offers fellatio to Dwight in exchange for the keys, but to no avail; instead, Dwight does it to himself. She knocks him out and takes the keys. Later that night, Oldman is seduced by the spirit of Kane's former mistress, who lures him below the mansion and reveals her true demonic form before killing him.

After Dwight equips the teens with weapons that can injure their spectral enemy, they are pursued throughout the mansion. Alex attempts to win Kane's love and searches for him, but is killed by Kane dropping a chandelier on her head. Buddy and Cindy are locked in the walk-in freezer, but Cindy uses a collection of random objects to produce a caterpillar tractor and escapes the freezer.

Hanson becomes possessed by Kane and kidnaps an inebriated Shorty. Cindy, Brenda, and Theo team up to battle him with highly stylized fight choreography but are defeated until Cindy successfully exorcises Kane's ghost out of Hanson. Dwight regroups with the teens, and Cindy volunteers to act as bait to lure Kane into a device that will destroy him. The plan succeeds, freeing the group from the house's curse.

Two months later, Cindy and Buddy are in a relationship. They are out on a walk when Buddy disappears and Hanson arrives to take Cindy away with him. Standing in the road, Cindy screams in terror and Hanson laughs maniacally only to be hit by a car driven by Shorty, who is receiving fellatio from the ghost of Kane's mistress.

== Cast ==
- Anna Faris as Cindy Campbell
- Regina Hall as Brenda Meeks
- Shawn Wayans as Ray Wilkins
- Marlon Wayans as Shorty Meeks
- Chris Masterson as Buddy Sanderson
- David Cross as Dwight Hartman
- Tori Spelling as Alex Monday
- Kathleen Robertson as Theo
- Tim Curry as Professor Oldman
- Chris Elliott as Hanson
- Richard Moll as Hugh Kane (Hell House Ghost)
- James Woods as Father McFeely
- Andy Richter as Father Harris
- Natasha Lyonne as Megan Voorhees
- Veronica Cartwright as Mrs. Voorhees
- James DeBello as Tommy
- Beetlejuice as Shorty's brain
- Matt Friedman (voice) as Polly the parrot
- Vitamin C (voice) as herself
- Suli McCullough (voice) as Clown
- Jennifer Curran as Victoria Crane, Hugh's mistress

== Production ==
The film is a sequel to Scary Movie. According to director Keenen Ivory Wayans, the filmmakers watched over 130 horror films for background research. Marlon Brando was originally cast as Father McFeely and completed one day of filming before he had to leave the production due to illness. He was replaced by James Woods who was paid $1 million for four days' work. Charlton Heston had also turned down the Woods role. At one point, former President Bill Clinton, who had just left office the year the film was released, was also considered.

In a 2024 interview prior to the brothers' return to the franchise for the sixth film, Marlon revealed the reasoning of his family's departure due to creative conflicts with producers Bob and Harvey Weinstein.

== Music ==
Unlike its predecessor, the film does not have an official soundtrack. It features a heavily hip-hop and rap catalogue, with some rock and techno songs. Sugar Ray, who appear on the soundtrack, were also on the soundtrack for the second entry in the Scream franchise in 1997, which the Scary Movie franchise was initially parodying.

- "Hello, Dolly!" (Jerry Herman)
- "Shake Ya Ass" – Mystikal
- "Tubular Bells" – Mike Oldfield
- "I Walk Alone" – Oleander
- "Killer Bee" – Meeks
- "If I Had No Loot" – Tony! Toni! Toné!
- "Givin' My Dick Away" – Trace
- "Holiday Party" – Big Daddy
- "Sorry Now" – Sugar Ray
- "Evel Knieval" – Ceasefire V Deadly Avenger
- "U Know What's Up" – Donell Jones
- "Graduation (Friends Forever)" – Vitamin C
- "Let Me Blow Ya Mind" – Eve featuring Gwen Stefani
- "History Repeating" – Propellerheads featuring Shirley Bassey
- "Fever" – Richard Marino & His Orchestra
- "Insane in the Brain" – Cypress Hill
- "Smack My Bitch Up" – The Prodigy
- "Skullsplitter" – Hednoize
- "Ride wit Me" – Nelly featuring City Spud (played over the end credit sequence)
- "So Erotic" – Casey Crown featuring Jay Dee (played in end credits)
- "When It's Dark" – Trace featuring Neb Luv (played in end credits)

== Release ==
=== Home media ===
The film was released on VHS and DVD by Buena Vista Home Entertainment under the Dimension Home Video banner on December 18, 2001, with an array of special features, including commentaries and various deleted scenes.

Dimension Films was sold by The Walt Disney Company in 2005, with its parent label Miramax then being sold by Disney in 2010. That same year, private equity firm Filmyard Holdings took control of Miramax and the pre-October 2005 library of Dimension. Following the sale of Miramax to Filmyard Holdings, they licensed the home media rights for several Dimension/Miramax titles to Lionsgate Films. Lionsgate Home Entertainment later reissued the DVD, and released the film on Blu-ray on September 20, 2011.

In March 2016, Qatari company beIN Media Group purchased Miramax from Filmyard Holdings. Then during April 2020, ViacomCBS (now known as Paramount Skydance) bought a 49% stake in Miramax, which gave them the rights to the Miramax library and the pre-October 2005 Dimension library. Through this deal, Paramount Pictures and beIN became co-owners of the first three films in the Scary Movie franchise, which were released between 2000 and 2003. Paramount Home Entertainment reissued the film on DVD and Blu-ray on July 27, 2021, also reissuing many other Dimension/Miramax titles around this time. Paramount Home Entertainment also released the first three Scary Movie films on a Blu-ray pack. This release was a reissue of an earlier Lionsgate release from December 2011. The film was made available on Paramount's subscription streaming service Paramount+, and on its free streaming service Pluto TV.

== Reception ==
=== Box office ===
Scary Movie 2 opened on the Fourth of July weekend and ranked second at the US box office behind Cats & Dogs, with $20.5 million. In North America, the film grossed $71.3 million. With $69.9 million internationally, the worldwide gross comes to $141.2 million. Out of the first four Scary Movie films, this was the least successful to date, until the fifth film in 2013.

=== Critical response ===
On Rotten Tomatoes, Scary Movie 2 has an approval rating of 13% based on 110 reviews and an average rating of 3.70/10. The site's critical consensus reads, "Instead of being funny, this gross-out sequel plays like a sloppy, rushed-out product." On Metacritic, the film has a score of 29 out of 100 based on 25 critics, indicating "generally unfavorable reviews". Audiences polled by CinemaScore gave the film an average grade of "B" on an A+ to F scale.

Awards and nominations for Scary Movie 2

Year	Award	Category	Recipient(s)	Result	Ref.
2001	Bogey Awards	Bronze Award	—N/a	Won	
2001	Teen Choice Awards	Choice Movie of the Summer	—N/a	Nominated	
2001	Teen Choice Awards	Choice Movie Your Parents Didn’t Want You to See	—N/a	Won	
2002	ALMA Awards	Excellence in Make-Up in Television and Film	Rebecca DeHerrera	Nominated	
2002	Canadian Comedy Awards	Best Female Performance	Kathleen Robertson	Nominated	

== Sequel ==
A sequel titled Scary Movie 3, was released in 2003.
