= Morris Chestnut =

American actor (born 1969)

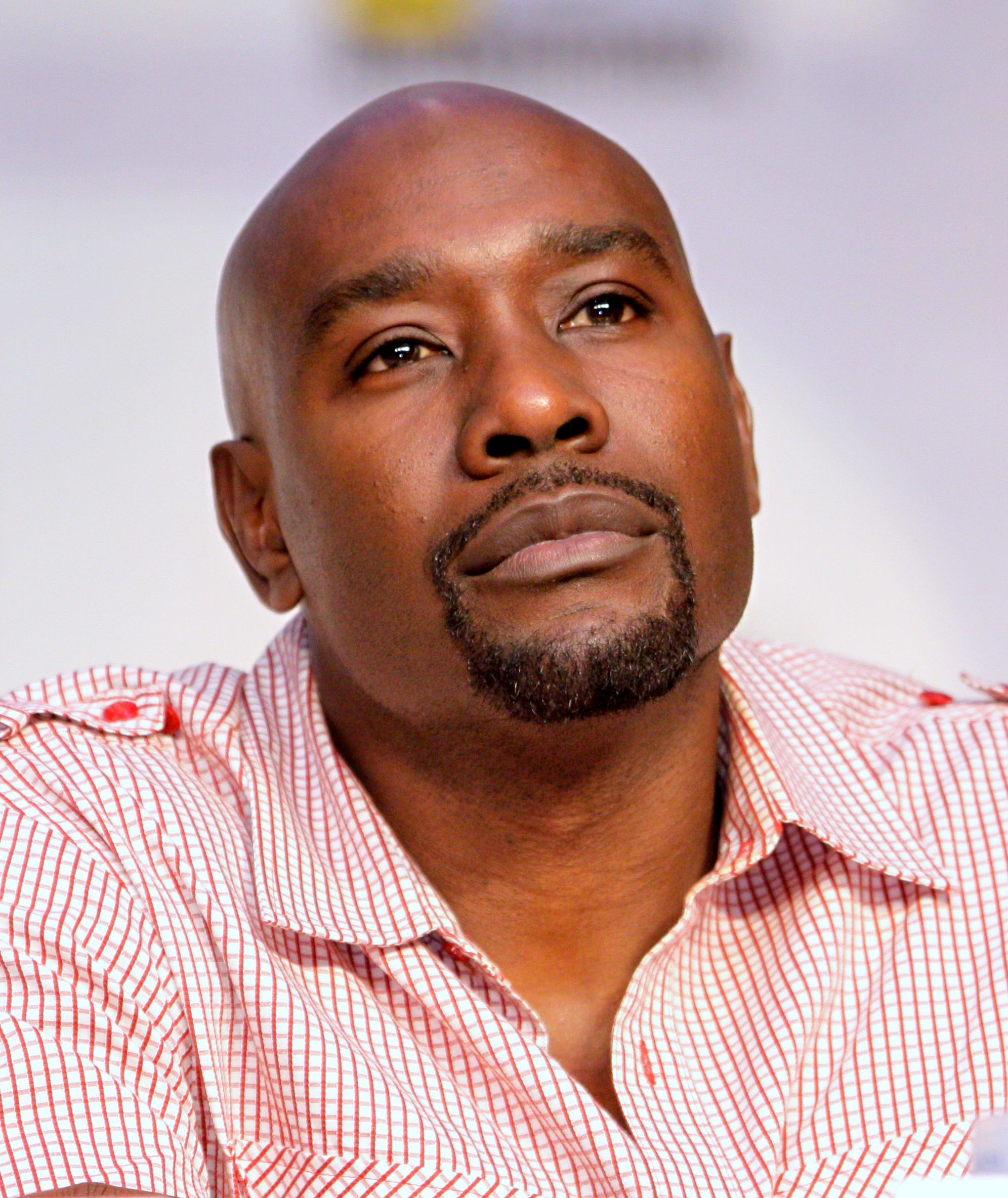
- Chestnut at San Diego Comic-Con in 2010
- Born: Morris Lamont Chestnut; January 1, 1969 (age 57); Cerritos, California, U.S.
- Education: California State University, Northridge
- Occupation: Actor
- Years active: 1988–present
- Spouse: Pam Byse (m. 1995)
- Children: 2

Morris Lamont Chestnut (born January 1, 1969) is an American actor. He first came to prominence for his role as Ricky Baker in the 1991 film Boyz n the Hood. He has appeared in feature films such as G.I. Jane, The Brothers, Like Mike, Ladder 49, The Game Plan, The Call, and Kick-Ass 2. He has also played Lance Sullivan in The Best Man (1999), reprising the role in the 2013 sequel film The Best Man Holiday, and 2022 follow-up series The Best Man: The Final Chapters.

His television roles have included Ryan Nichols in ABC's V, Ike Prentiss in Showtime's Nurse Jackie, the lead role of Beaumont Darius Rosewood, Jr. in Fox's Rosewood, Hakeem Rashad in Prime Video's Goliath, Barrett Cain in Fox's The Resident, Corey Cash in Hulu's Reasonable Doubt, and the title character in Watson for CBS.

Chestnut has been nominated for seven NAACP Image Awards, winning for Nurse Jackie and The Best Man: The Final Chapters. His body of work has seen him receive a star on the Hollywood Walk of Fame.

== Early life ==
Chestnut was born on January 1, 1969, in Cerritos, California, the son of Morris and Shirley Chestnut. His mother was a teacher, while his father worked as a medical salesman. He studied finance and drama at California State University, Northridge. Chestnut worked as a bank teller prior to being an actor.

== Career ==
=== Boys n the Hood and breakout ===
Chestnut's first professional acting role was as Jason in the Freddy's Nightmares episode "A Family Affair", which aired on February 18, 1990. His first feature film role was as Ricky Baker in Boyz n the Hood (1991). He followed that up with roles in various TV movies, notably including the Peabody Award winning Disney Channel film The Ernest Green Story, in which he played Ernest Green. Chestnut also appeared in Patti LaBelle's short-lived sitcom Out All Night. His career continued to rise steadily with co-starring roles in standard big-budget studio films such as Under Siege 2: Dark Territory (1995) with Steven Seagal and Katherine Heigl, and G.I. Jane (1997) with Demi Moore. He was also a regular cast member on ABC's action drama series C-16, in the role of Special Agent Mal Robinson, from 1997 to 1998.

=== The Best Man and other films ===
In 1999, Chestnut starred in The Best Man with Taye Diggs and Nia Long, as Lance Sullivan, a professional football player on the eve of his wedding. The Best Man earned positive reviews from the press and did well at the box office. For his performance, Chestnut earned an NAACP Image Award nomination. He again played a football player in Disney's The Game Plan (2007), co-starring opposite Dwayne Johnson.

Chestnut starred in The Brothers (2001), a film centering on the themes of fidelity and success among young Black professionals. That same year, he portrayed Keith Fenton, the love interest of Vivica A. Fox, in the romantic comedy Two Can Play That Game and appeared as basketball player Tracey Reynolds in 2002 film Like Mike. In 2004, he played firefighter Tommy Drake in Ladder 49, opposite John Travolta and Joaquin Phoenix.

He has worked with Steven Seagal three times: Under Siege 2: Dark Territory (1995) as his reluctant partner and lead male villain in Half Past Dead (2002) and Prince of Pistols (2008).

Chestnut appeared in four films in 2013: Identity Thief, The Call, Kick-Ass 2 (playing Omari Hardwick's character from the first film), and The Best Man sequel The Best Man Holiday, in which he reprised his role as Lance Sullivan, earning him another NAACP Image Award nomination.

Recent cinema work includes The Perfect Guy, Heist (both 2015) and When the Bough Breaks (2016).

=== Television work ===
In recent years, the majority of Chestnut's work has been in television.

From 2009 to 2011, Chestnut starred as Visitor Ryan Nichols in the ABC science fiction drama V, based on the classic 1983 miniseries. In 2011, he recurred as Luke in the first season of American Horror Story, and in 2013, he joined the cast of Showtime's medical dramedy Nurse Jackie as war veteran Dr. Ike Prentiss, staying for two seasons. For his performance in the latter, he won the NAACP Image Award for Outstanding Supporting Actor in a Comedy Series. Shortly afterward, he co-starred in the TNT crime drama Legends opposite Sean Bean.

From 2015 to 2017, Chestnut played the starring role of pathologist Dr. Beaumont "Rosie" Rosewood Jr. in the Fox crime procedural Rosewood, receiving another NAACP Image nomination as a result.

Chestnut had main roles in the second season of Prime Video's Goliath, and NBC's The Enemy Within. He played cold-hearted neurosurgeon Barrett Cain in seasons three and four of the Fox medical drama The Resident, and appeared as Raymond Dupont in the short-lived Our Kind of People, also for Fox.

In 2022, he once more played Lance Sullivan in the Peacock limited series The Best Man: The Final Chapters, winning his second NAACP Image Award. In 2023, he hosted Rebuilding Black Wall Street, an OWN/Sunwise Media docuseries covering the history and renovation of the Tulsa neighbourhood of Greenwood. In 2024, he starred opposite Diarra Kilpatrick in the BET+ mystery-dramedy Diarra from Detroit, and joined the main cast for the second season of Hulu's legal drama Reasonable Doubt. For the latter, he earned his sixth NAACP Image Award nomination.

From 2025 to 2026, Chestnut starred in the CBS medical-mystery series Watson, playing Dr. Watson from the Sherlock Holmes stories. For his performance, he received his seventh NAACP Image Award nomination.

== Personal life and other work ==
Chestnut has been married to Pam Byse-Chestnut since 1995. The couple have two children, son Grant and daughter Paige. Chestnut was raised in the Baptist church, and he is a practicing Christian.

In 1998, Chestnut won the annual Madden Bowl video game competition.

To prepare to reprise his role as professional football player Lance Sullivan in The Best Man Holiday, Chestnut trained with celebrity fitness trainer Obi Obadike to get into shape. This inspired him to become Obadike's co-author on the health and fitness book, The Cut. Published on April 18, 2017, the book contains exercise drills and recipes.

People magazine named Chestnut as one of the "Sexiest Men Alive" in 2015.

In March 2022, Chestnut was inducted into the Hollywood Walk of Fame with a star that was unveiled in his presence.

In 2024, Chestnut reunited with The Best Man director Malcolm D. Lee, and co-stars Harold Perrineau and Taye Diggs, to found Sable Bourbon, a spirits brand.

On December 9, 2024, Chestnut and actress Mindy Kaling announced the nominations for the 82nd Golden Globe Awards. At the ceremony itself, Chestnut and Kaley Cuoco presented the Best Screenplay award.

== Filmography ==
=== Film ===
Year	Title	Role	Notes
1991	Boyz n the Hood	Ricky Baker	
1991	The Last Boy Scout	Locker Room Kid	
1992	In the Line of Duty: Street War	Prince Franklin	TV movie
1993	The Ernest Green Story	Ernest Green	TV movie
1994	The Inkwell	Harold Lee	
1995	Higher Learning	Track Anchor	
1995	Under Siege 2: Dark Territory	Bobby Zachs	
1997	G.I. Jane	McCool	
1997	Firehouse	Andre	
1999	The Best Man	Lance Sullivan	
2001	The Brothers	Jackson Smith	
2001	Two Can Play That Game	Keith Fenton	
2001	Scenes of the Crime	Ray	
2001	The Killing Yard	Shango	TV movie
2002	Like Mike	Tracy Reynolds	
2002	Half Past Dead	Donny Johnson / 49ner One	
2003	Confidence	Travis	
2004	Breakin' All the Rules	Evan Fields	
2004	Anacondas: The Hunt for the Blood Orchid	Gordon Mitchell	
2004	Ladder 49	Tommy Drake	
2005	The Cave	'Top' Buchanan	
2007	The Game Plan	Travis Sanders	
2007	The Perfect Holiday	Benjamin	
2008	The Prince of Motor City	Leo Moore	TV movie
2009	Not Easily Broken	Dave Johnson	
2009	Love in the Nick of Tyme	Marcelles Wynters	Video
2012	Think Like a Man	James Merrill	
2013	Identity Thief	Detective Reilly	
2013	The Call	Officer Phillips	
2013	Kick-Ass 2	Detective Marcus Williams	
2013	The Best Man Holiday	Lance Sullivan	
2015	The Perfect Guy	Dave	
2015	Heist	Derrick 'Dog' Prince	
2016	When the Bough Breaks	John Taylor	
2017	Girls Trip	Himself	

=== Television ===
Year	Title	Role	Notes
1990	Freddy's Nightmares	Jason Woodman	Episode: "A Family Affair"
1992–1993	Out All Night	Jeff Carswell	Main Cast
1994	Soul Train	Himself/Guest Host	Episode: "Patti LaBelle/Sounds of Blackness/Simple E"
1994	Living Single	Hamilton Brown	Recurring Cast: Season 1
1997–1998	C-16: FBI	Special Agent Mal Robinson	Main Cast
2000	ER	ICU Nurse Frank "Rambo" Bacon	Guest Cast: Seasons 6–7
2005	Bones	Agent Oakes	Episode: "The Man in the Wall"
2006	In the Mix	Himself	Episode: "Xmas in March...."
2009–2011	V	Ryan Nichols	Main Cast
2011	American Horror Story	Luke Maxcy	Recurring Cast: Season 1
2013	American Dad!	Craig (voice)	Episode: "For Black Eyes Only"
2013–2014	Nurse Jackie	Dr. Ike Prentiss	Main Cast: Seasons 5–6
2014–2015	Legends	Tony Rice	Main Cast: Season 1, Recurring Cast: Season 2
2015–2017	Rosewood	Dr. Beaumont Rosewood Jr.	Main Cast
2016–2017	Live with Kelly and Mark	Himself/Guest Co-Host	Guest Co-Host: Season 28, Recurring Guest Co-Host: Season 29
2018	Unsung Hollywood	Himself	Episode: "The Best Man"
2018	Goliath	D.D.A. Hakeem Rashad	Main Cast: Season 2
2019	Being Mary Jane	Beau Mercer	Episode: "Becoming Pauletta"
2019	The Enemy Within	FBI Agent Will Keaton	Main Cast
2019–2021	The Resident	Dr. Barrett Cain	Main Cast: Seasons 3–4
2021	Our Kind of People	Raymond Dupont	Main Cast
2022	Celebrity Game Face	Himself	Episode: "Cedric the Entertainer Busts Kevin's Chops"
2022	The Best Man: The Final Chapters	Lance Sullivan	Main Cast
2022–2023	All American	Rick Barnes	Recurring Cast: Season 5
2023	The Talk	Himself/Guest Co-Host	Recurring Guest Co-Host: Season 13
2023	Rebuilding Black Wall Street	Himself/Host	Main Host
2024	Diarra from Detroit	Francois "Swa" Brickland	Main Cast
2024–	Reasonable Doubt	Corey Cash	Main Cast: Season 2, Recurring Cast: Season 3
2025	After Midnight	Himself	Episode: "Episode #2.67"
2025	Number One on the Call Sheet	Himself	Episode: "Black Leading Men in Hollywood"
2025–2026	Watson	Dr. John Watson	Main Cast

Key
†	Denotes series/miniseries that have not yet been released

=== Music videos ===
Year	Song	Artist
2003	"Dance with My Father"	Luther Vandross

== Theatrical performances ==
- Love In The Nick of Tyme (2007)
- What My Husband Doesn't Know (2011)
- The Nutcracker (2013)

== Published work ==
- Chestnut, Morris (2017). The Cut: Lose Up to 10 Pounds in 10 Days and Sculpt Your Best Body. Hachette Book Group, Inc. ISBN 978-1455565238.

== Awards and nominations ==
Year	Awards	Category	Recipient	Outcome
2000	NAACP Image Award	NAACP Image Award for Outstanding Actor in a Motion Picture	The Best Man	Nominated
2014	Acapulco Black Film Festival	Acapulco Black Film Festival Award for Best Acting Ensemble	The Best Man Holiday	Won
2014	Acapulco Black Film Festival	Acapulco Black Film Festival Award for Best Actor	The Best Man Holiday	Nominated
2014	NAACP Image Award	NAACP Image Award for Outstanding Supporting Actor in a Motion Picture	The Best Man Holiday	Nominated
2014	NAACP Image Award	NAACP Image Award for Outstanding Supporting Actor in a Comedy Series	Nurse Jackie	Won
2016	NAACP Image Award	NAACP Image Award for Outstanding Actor in a Drama Series	Rosewood	Nominated
2023	NAACP Image Award	NAACP Image Award for Outstanding Actor in a Television Movie, Mini-Series or Dramatic Special	The Best Man: The Final Chapters	Won
2025	NAACP Image Award	NAACP Image Award for Outstanding Actor in a Drama Series	Reasonable Doubt	Nominated
2026	NAACP Image Award	NAACP Image Award for Outstanding Actor in a Drama Series	Watson	Nominated
