= Shailyn Pierre-Dixon =

Canadian actress (born 2003)

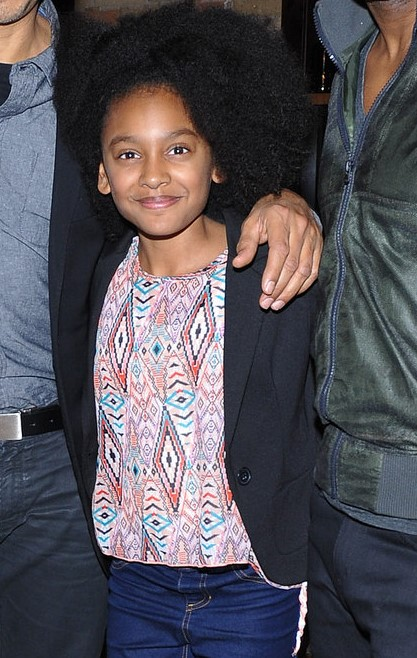
- Pierre-Dixon in 2015
- Born: June 1, 2003 (age 23); Caledon, Ontario, Canada
- Occupation: Actress
- Years active: 2013–present
- Website: https://www.shailynpierredixon.com/

Shailyn Pierre-Dixon (born June 1, 2003) is a Canadian actress. She is best known for her role as the young Aminata in the television miniseries The Book of Negroes, for which she won the Canadian Screen Award for Best Supporting Actress in a Drama Series in 2016. She has also appeared in the films The Best Man Holiday, Suicide Squad and Jean of the Joneses, and she plays the character Franny in the television series Between.

== Early life ==
Pierre-Dixon was born June 1, 2003, in Caledon, Ontario, to Christina Dixon, a Canadian actress, writer, and producer, and Maurice Pierre. She attributes her interest in acting to her mother, after seeing her on set. She is enrolled in the drama program at Mayfield Secondary School.

== Career ==
Pierre-Dixon began her career as a child model, appearing in commercials and advertisements. Her first major role was in the 2013 Hollywood film, The Best Man Holiday, as Kelly, the on-screen daughter of Regina Hall and Harold Perrineau. She played the role of young Aminata in the 2015 CBC miniseries The Book of Negroes. Her performance in The Book of Negroes led to a Canadian Screen Award for Best Supporting Actress in a Drama Series at the 4th Canadian Screen Awards in 2016. From 2015 to 2016, Pierre-Dixon appeared as Frances in the Netflix and CityTV series, Between. In 2016, she appeared in Jean of the Joneses as Mary Jones and Suicide Squad as Zoe Lawton, the daughter of Deadshot (played by Will Smith).

In 2023, the actress starred in an 8 part short form CBC Gem series Macy Murdoch, aimed at pre-teens based on the TV series Murdoch Mysteries, where she plays the great great great granddaughter of William Murdoch. Along with her friends Billie and Zane she travels back in time to solve a mystery where her ancestor Murdoch is framed for murder.

In 2015, Pierre-Dixon had the honor of presenting at the Canadian Screen Awards, making her one of the youngest presenters in the Academy's history at 11 years old.

== Filmography ==
=== Film ===
| Year | Title | Role | Notes |
|---|---|---|---|
| 2013 | The Best Man Holiday | Kelly | |
| 2016 | Suicide Squad | Zoe Lawton | |
| 2016 | Jean of the Joneses | Mary Jones | |
| 2025 | The Well | Sarah Devine | Premiere at the 29th Fantasia International Film Festival on July 21, 2025 for its World Premiere. |

=== Television ===
| Year | Title | Role | Notes |
|---|---|---|---|
| 2015-2016 | Between | Frances | 2015 (Recurring); 2016 (Main) |
| 2015 | The Book of Negroes | Young Aminata | Winner: Canadian Screen Award for Best Supporting Actress in a Drama Series (2016) |
