= Taye Diggs =

American actor and singer (born 1971)

- Diggs in 2026
- Born: Scott Leo Berry; January 2, 1971 (age 55); Newark, New Jersey, U.S.
- Education: Syracuse University (BFA)
- Occupations: Actor; singer
- Years active: 1994–present
- Spouse: Idina Menzel (m. 2003; div. 2014)
- Children: 1
- Relatives: Misty Copeland (cousin-in-law)

Scott Leo "Taye" Diggs (né Berry; born January 2, 1971) is an American actor and singer. He is known for his roles in the Broadway musicals Rent and Hedwig and the Angry Inch, the TV series Private Practice (2007–2013), Murder in the First (2014–2016), and All American (2018–2023), and the films How Stella Got Her Groove Back (1998), Brown Sugar, Chicago (both 2002), Malibu's Most Wanted (2003), Dylan Dog: Dead of Night (2011), and The Best Man (1999) and its sequel, The Best Man Holiday (2013).

== Early life and education ==
Scott Leo Berry was born in Newark, New Jersey, and grew up in the South Wedge neighborhood of Rochester, New York. His mother, Marcia (née Berry), was a teacher and actress, and his father, Andre Young, was a visual artist. When he was a child, his mother married Jeffries Diggs, whose surname Taye took. His nickname, Taye, comes from the playful pronunciation of Scotty as "Scottay". He is the oldest of five children. He has two brothers, Gabriel and Michael, and two sisters, Christian and Shalom. He attended Allendale Columbia School in Rochester and later transferred to School of the Arts. He received a BFA in musical theater in 1993 from Syracuse University College of Visual and Performing Arts.

Diggs performed many times at the popular Lakes Region Summer Theatre in Meredith, New Hampshire. He also spent the summer of 1992 at the New London Barn Playhouse in New London, New Hampshire. His Broadway debut was in the ensemble cast of the 1994 Tony Award-winning revival of the musical Carousel. In 1995, he also performed as a dancer in Sebastian's Caribbean Carnival at Tokyo Disneyland.

== Career ==
In 1996, Diggs originated the role of the landlord Benny in Jonathan Larson's Tony Award- and Pulitzer Prize-winning Rent, which also starred his future wife, Idina Menzel. After Rent, he appeared as Mr. Black opposite Menzel's character of Kate in Andrew Lippa's off-Broadway production of The Wild Party at Manhattan Theatre Club. Diggs also played The Bandleader in the 2002 film version of the Broadway revival of Chicago and filled in as Billy Flynn on Broadway. He also temporarily filled in for Norbert Leo Butz (an original Rent standby) as the love interest Fiyero of Menzel's Elphaba character in Wicked.

Diggs then moved from stage to television with a role on the soap opera Guiding Light. In 1998, he made his film debut in How Stella Got Her Groove Back, which brought Diggs much acclaim and exposure. The following year, he played a tantric sex god in Doug Liman's Go, and AWOL groom in the coming-of-age drama The Wood alongside Omar Epps. Malcolm D. Lee's The Best Man features Diggs as the title character, an author and best friend of the groom (portrayed by Morris Chestnut).

He also starred in the 1999 remake of William Castle's House on Haunted Hill. Diggs was featured in an episode of America's Next Top Model helping the contestants through an acting challenge. Another notable role of his was on the comedy-drama Ally McBeal as a lawyer named Jackson Duper who was the love interest of the character Renee Raddick and the possible love interest of the Ling Woo character.

Diggs portrayed the title character on the short-lived UPN television series Kevin Hill which despite critical acclaim was not renewed for a second season. He reprised the role of Benny for the 2005 Rent film. Diggs is featured on the following cast recordings: Carousel 1994 revival cast; Rent 1996 original Broadway cast; The Wild Party original off-Broadway cast. He also sings on the Rent film soundtrack. In 2002, he reprised his role as the Bandleader in the film adaptation of Chicago, and also played opposite Christian Bale as Bale's partner/antagonist Brandt in the dystopian sci-fi thriller Equilibrium.

In 2003, Diggs appeared on the TV show Punk'd after being tricked by Ashton Kutcher, while getting a check-up at a Punk'd-operated doctor's office. In early 2006, Diggs guest-starred for several episodes as Will Truman's love interest, James, on the eighth season of Will & Grace. In May, ABC picked up his pilot, Day Break, in which he portrayed a detective trapped in the same day and forced to relive it to clear his name of murder; the show debuted in mid-November 2006, but was abruptly canceled due to poor ratings. Although his film and television career continue to move forward, he still returns to the stage frequently. He was seen opposite James McDaniel in Charles Fuller's A Soldier's Play at Second Stage Theatre in New York.

Diggs co-starred as Sam Bennett opposite Kate Walsh in Private Practice, the spin-off of Grey's Anatomy, which ran for six seasons from 2007 until 2013. Diggs had a guest role on The West Wing as a Secret Service agent in charge of the security detail for the President's daughter. He then guest-starred on Grey's Anatomy again in a Grey's Anatomy/Private Practice crossover event. Diggs had a major role in the live action adaptation of the comic Dylan Dog: Dead of Night (2011). He also narrated the ESPN Films documentary The Fab Five about University of Michigan basketball players Chris Webber, Juwan Howard, Jalen Rose, Jimmy King, and Ray Jackson. Diggs is one of the stars of the independent film drama Between Us that won the grand jury prize at the 2012 Bahamas International Film Festival among its other festival appearances.

From 2014 until 2016, Diggs starred in the TNT serial crime drama Murder in the First with Kathleen Robertson. The show ran for three seasons. Diggs is the author of four children's books, Mixed Me! (2015), Chocolate Me (2015), I Love You More Than... (2018), and My Friend! (2021), all illustrated by Shane Evans (artist). Diggs performed the role of the titular character Hedwig in the Broadway production of Hedwig and the Angry Inch at the Belasco Theatre from July 22, 2015, until the production's closing on September 13, 2015. In 2017, Diggs appeared in the films 'Til Death Do Us Part and My Little Pony: The Movie, where he voices Capper the cat.

Diggs has twice appeared on Paramount Network's reality competition series Lip Sync Battle and is the show's only two-time winner. In a third-season episode against Ne-Yo, Diggs sang his competitor's song "Let Me Love You (Until You Learn to Love Yourself)" and then performed as Madonna for round two's performance of "Vogue". In his next appearance, the fourth season's Christina Aguilera tribute episode, he competed against Erika Jayne, performing "Beautiful" and "Candyman".

Diggs hosted the game show Hypnotize Me with hypnotist Keith Barry, based on Barry's British program You're Back in the Room. Hypnotize Me was originally shot for broadcast on FOX in 2016, but never aired on the network. The eight-episode series was eventually broadcast on The CW, in the summer of 2019. Diggs starred in the horror film Incarnation alongside Jessica Uberuaga and Michael Madsen, the film was released in 2022. In 2023, Diggs co-starred alongside Apryl Jones in the Peacock streaming film The Comeback. Diggs also starred in BET+ films two part series in 2023 Love & Murder: Atlanta Playboy , with part one releasing on September 21 and the second part releasing on September 28. Diggs starred and was executive producer alongside Meagan Good in Terry McMillan Presents: Forever which premiered on Lifetime on August 24, 2024.

In 2025, Taye Diggs worked in RoboGobo voicing Pupsiscle for season one where the role was recast to James Monroe Iglehart in season 2. He also starred in the Lifetime short film I'll Be Home for Margarita Day with Maria Menounos which was presented by Chili's.

== Personal life ==
Diggs is the co-artistic director of a dance company, Dre.dance, with fellow Broadway veteran and School of the Arts alumnus Andrew Palermo.

Diggs married his Rent co-star, actress Idina Menzel, on January 11, 2003. Their son, Walker Nathaniel Diggs, was born on September 2, 2009. In 2013, the couple separated after ten years of marriage. Their divorce was finalized on December 3, 2014.

In 2014, Diggs began a relationship with real estate agent Amanza Smith. They split in 2019.

From 2021 to 2023, Diggs was in a relationship with Love & Hip Hop: Hollywood star Apryl Jones.

== Filmography ==
=== Film ===
Year	Title	Role	Notes
1998	How Stella Got Her Groove Back	Winston Shakespeare	Nominated—Acapulco Black Film Festival Award for Best Actor
1999	Go	Marcus	
1999	The Wood	Roland	
1999	The Best Man	Harper Stewart	Nominated—NAACP Image Award for Outstanding Actor in a Motion Picture
1999	House on Haunted Hill	Eddie Baker	Blockbuster Entertainment Award for Favorite Supporting Actor – Horror
2000	The Way of the Gun	Jeffers	
2002	New Best Friend	Sheriff Artie Bonner	
2002	Just a Kiss	Andre	Uncredited
2002	Brown Sugar	Andre Romulus 'Dre' Ellis	Nominated—NAACP Image Award for Outstanding Actor in a Motion Picture; Nominated—Teen Choice Award for Choice Movie Chemistry (with Sanaa Lathan); Nominated—Teen Choice Award for Choice Movie Liplock (with Sanaa Lathan)
2002	Equilibrium	Andrew Brandt	
2002	Chicago	The Bandleader	Broadcast Film Critics Association Award for Best Cast; Critics' Choice Movie Award for Best Acting Ensemble; Screen Actors Guild Award for Outstanding Performance by a Cast in a Motion Picture; Nominated—Phoenix Film Critics Society Award for Best Cast
2003	Basic	Jay Pike	
2003	Malibu's Most Wanted	Sean (aka Blood Bath)	
2004	Drum	Henry Nxumalo	
2005	Rent	Benjamin "Benny" Coffin III	Nominated—Broadcast Film Critics Association Award for Best Cast
2005	Cake	Hemingway Jones	
2007	Slow Burn	Jeffrey Sykes	
2008	Days of Wrath	Steve Lerato	
2010	Our Family Wedding	Whipped Friend	Uncredited
2011	Dylan Dog: Dead of Night	Vampire Vargas	
2011	The Fab Five	Narrator	
2012	Between Us	Carlo	
2013	The Best Man Holiday	Harper Stewart	Acapulco Black Film Festival Award for Best Cast
2013	Baggage Claim	Langston Jefferson Battle III	Nominated—Acapulco Black Film Festival Award for Best Cast
2015	Larry Gaye: Renegade Male Flight Attendant	Rasta Cab Driver	
2016	Opening Night	Malcolm	
2017	My Little Pony: The Movie	Capper	Voice
2017	'Til Death Do Us Part	Alex Stone	Also producer
2018	Set It Up	Rick	
2018	River Runs Red	Charles Coleman Sr.	
2022	Incarnation	Brad	
2023	The Comeback	Jeff Murray	Also executive producer
2025	Both Eyes Open	Dr. Eric Murphy	
2025	His, Hers & Ours	Darius Stone	
2026	Stepfather	Darnell / Leon / Kennedy	Tubi Film
2026	Forever This Ring †	Maverick Collins	To be released

=== Television ===
Year	Title	Role	Notes
1996	New York Undercover	Stephon	Episode: "No Greater Love"
1996	Law & Order	Sky Bell	Episode: "Good Girl"
1997	Guiding Light	Adrian "Sugar" Hill	Unknown episodes
2001	Ally McBeal	Jackson Duper	10 episodes Nominated—NAACP Image Award for Outstanding Supporting Actor in a Comedy Series
2003	Punk'd	Himself	Episode: "2.5"
2003	Ed	Himself	Episode: "Captain Lucidity"
2003	The West Wing	Secret Service Agent Wesley Davis	2 episodes
2004	America's Next Top Model	Himself	Episode: "The Girls Meet Taye Diggs"
2004–2005	Kevin Hill	Kevin Hill	22 episodes and also producer NAACP Image Award for Outstanding Actor in a Drama Series
2006	Will & Grace	James	4 episodes
2006–2007	Day Break	Detective Brett Hopper	13 episodes and also producer
2007–2009	Grey's Anatomy	Dr. Sam Bennett	3 episodes
2007–2013	Private Practice	Dr. Sam Bennett	111 episodes NAACP Image Award for Outstanding Supporting Actor in a Drama Series; Nominated—NAACP Image Award for Outstanding Actor in a Drama Series (2010, 2012); Nominated—NAACP Image Award for Outstanding Supporting Actor in a Drama Series; Nominated—People's Choice Award for Favorite TV Drama Actor
2009	The Super Hero Squad Show	Black Panther (voice)	Episode: "Tremble at the Might of M.O.D.O.K.!"
2009	Better Off Ted	Greg	Episode: "Love Blurts"
2010	Black Panther	Historical Panther #2 (voice)	Episode: "Pilot"
2010, 2014	Sesame Street	Himself	2 episodes
2013	New Girl	Artie	Episode: "Coach"
2014–2016	Murder in the First	Inspector Terrance English	32 episodes Nominated—NAACP Image Award for Outstanding Actor in a Drama Series; Nominated—People's Choice Award for Favorite Cable TV Actor
2014	The Good Wife	Dean Levine-Wilkins	3 episodes
2015	Repeat After Me	Himself	Episode: "#1.8"
2015, 2017	Doc McStuffins	Declan (voice)	2 episodes
2015–2016	Rosewood	Mike Boyce	3 episodes
2016	NCIS	USMC Gunnery Sergeant Aaron Davis	Episode: "Scope"
2016–2017	Empire	Councilman Angelo DuBois	23 episodes
2017–2018	Lip Sync Battle	Himself	2 episodes
2018–2026	All American	Billy Baker	Main cast (seasons 1—5); guest (seasons 6 and 8)
2019	Rent: Live	Himself	Television special
2019	Selling Sunset	Himself	Episode: "(Real) Diamonds Are a Girl's Best Friend"
2019	Hypnotize Me	Himself	8 episodes
2019	Elena of Avalor	Sanza (voice)	Episode: "Flower of Light"
2020	Celebrity Ghost Stories	Himself	Episode: "Taye Diggs"
2020	Muppets Now	Himself	6 episodes
2021	The Celebrity Dating Game	Himself	Episode: "Taye Diggs and Demi Burnett"
2021	Ada Twist, Scientist	Mr. Twist (voice)	6 episodes
2022	The Best Man: The Final Chapters	Harper Stewart	Main cast
2022	Back in the Groove	Himself	Host; 8 episodes
2023	S.W.A.T.	Danny	Episode: "All That Glitters"
2023	Love & Murder: Atlanta Playboy	Lance Herndon	2 episodes
2024	Alert: Missing Persons Unit	Himself	Episode: "Federal Prisoner #07198F-068P"
2024	Terry McMillian Presents: Forever	Johniee	Also executive producer
2024–present	Ariel	King Triton (voice)	Main role
2025	RoboGobo	Pupsicle (voice)	9 episodes (season 1)
2025	I'll Be Home for Margarita Day	Sam	Television short

=== Music videos ===
Year	Title	Artist(s)	Ref.
1995	"Temptations"	2pac	
1999	"Let's Not Play The Game"	Maxwell	
2002	"Boys"	Britney Spears featuring Pharrell Williams	
2014	"Imagine" (UNICEF: World version)	Various	

=== Stage ===
Year	Title	Role	Notes
1994	Carousel	Policeman / Cyrus Hamlin u/s Jigger Craigin	Broadway
1996	Rent	Benjamin Coffin III	Off-Broadway
1996-1997	Rent	Benjamin Coffin III	Broadway
2000	The Wild Party	Mr. Black	Off-Broadway
2002	Chicago	Billy Flynn	Broadway
2003–2004	Wicked	Fiyero Tigelaar	Broadway
2005	A Soldier's Play	Captain Richard Davenport	Off-Broadway
2015	Hedwig and the Angry Inch	Hedwig Robinson	Broadway
2018	Beauty and the Beast	Gaston	Hollywood Bowl
2025	Moulin Rouge! The Musical	The Duke of Monroth	Broadway

== Awards and nominations ==
Year	Association	Category	Nominated work	Result
1999	Acapulco Black Film Festival	Best Actor	How Stella Got Her Groove Back	Nominated
2000	Blockbuster Entertainment Awards	Favorite Supporting Actor – Horror	House on Haunted Hill	Won
2000	NAACP Image Awards	Outstanding Actor in a Motion Picture	The Best Man	Nominated
2002	NAACP Image Awards	Outstanding Supporting Actor in a Comedy Series	Ally McBeal	Nominated
2003	Broadcast Film Critics Association Awards	Broadcast Film Critics Association Award for Best Cast	Chicago	Won
2003	NAACP Image Awards	Outstanding Actor in a Motion Picture	Brown Sugar	Nominated
2003	Phoenix Film Critics Society Awards	Best Cast	Chicago	Nominated
2003	Teen Choice Awards	Choice Movie Chemistry (with Sanaa Lathan)	Brown Sugar	Nominated
2003	Teen Choice Awards	Choice Movie Liplock (with Sanaa Lathan)	Brown Sugar	Nominated
2003	Screen Actors Guild Awards	Outstanding Performance by a Cast in a Motion Picture	Chicago	Won
2005	NAACP Image Awards	Outstanding Actor in a Drama Series	Kevin Hill	Won
2006	Broadcast Film Critics Association Awards	Best Cast	Rent	Nominated
2008	NAACP Image Awards	Outstanding Supporting Actor in a Drama Series	Private Practice	Nominated
2009	NAACP Image Awards	Outstanding Supporting Actor in a Drama Series	Private Practice	Won
2010	NAACP Image Awards	Outstanding Actor in a Drama Series	Private Practice	Nominated
2011	People's Choice Awards	Favorite TV Drama Actor	Private Practice	Nominated
2012	NAACP Image Awards	NAACP Image Award for Outstanding Actor in a Drama Series	Private Practice	Nominated
2013	Acapulco Black Film Festival	Best Cast	Baggage Claim	Nominated
2013	Acapulco Black Film Festival	Best Cast	The Best Man Holiday	Won
2015	NAACP Image Awards	Outstanding Actor in a Drama Series	Murder in the First	Nominated
2016	42nd People's Choice Awards	Favorite Cable TV Actor	Murder in the First	Nominated

== In popular culture ==
- In 2012, in the "Dr. Klaustus" episode of the animated series American Dad!, the character Roger sees a picture of Diggs in a magazine and comments that he is "still perfect". He refers to Diggs as "my constant, my ebony north star".
- On the NBC series Parks and Recreation, Diggs is often referenced by character Tom Haverford, who likens himself to Diggs. He also fantasizes about co-owning a burlesque nightclub with Diggs and two of the Pussycat Dolls.
- On the NBC series 30 Rock, Diggs is referenced as a male-excellence example by Jack Donaghy: "If I were dating a man he would be at the top of my list, with Michael Jordan, Denzel Washington."
- On the ABC/TBS television series Cougar Town, the character Laurie Keller is shown to have a crush on Diggs. She describes his smile as one that "lights up the world" and has numerous pictures of him in her apartment.
- Season 4 episode 10 of Unbreakable Kimmy Schmidt: the only people who follow Fran's girlfriend Monica on Twitter are her mother "and, of course, Taye Diggs".
