= NAACP Image Award for Outstanding Supporting Actor in a Motion Picture =

American film award

NAACP Image Award for Best Supporting Actor in a Motion Picture
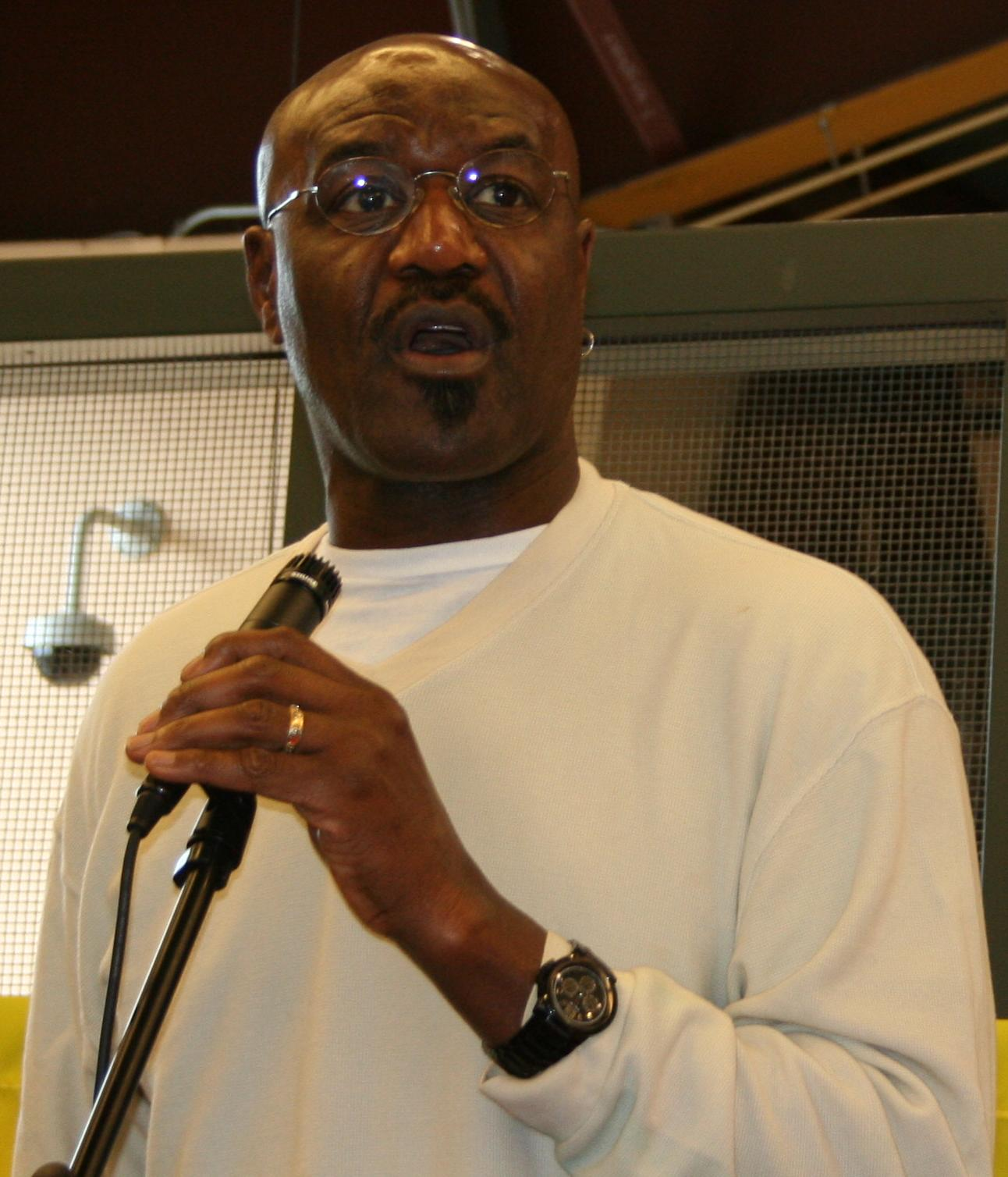
- The 2026 recipient Delroy Lindo
- Awarded for: Outstanding Performance by a Male Actor in a Supporting Role in a Motion Picture
- Presented by: NAACP
- First award: Redd Foxx for Cotton Comes to Harlem (1970)
- Currently held by: Delroy Lindo for Sinners (2026)

Highlights
- Most awards: Morgan Freeman and Denzel Washington (4 each)
- Most nominations: Don Cheadle (8)

This article lists the winners and nominees for the NAACP Image Award for Outstanding Supporting Actor in a Motion Picture. The award was introduced in 1970 and was awarded sporadically until its permanent feature from 1995 onwards. Morgan Freeman and Denzel Washington currently hold the record for most wins in this category, with four each.

== Winners and nominees ==
For each year in the tables below, the winner is listed first and highlighted in bold.

=== 1970s ===
| Year | Actor | Film | Ref |
|---|---|---|---|
| 1970 | **Redd Foxx** | **Cotton Comes to Harlem** | |
| 1971 | —N/a | | |
| 1972 | **Roscoe Lee Browne** | **The Cowboys** | |
| 1973–1976 | —N/a | | |
| 1977 | **DeWayne Jessie** | **The Bingo Long Traveling All-Stars & Motor Kings** | |
| 1978–1979 | —N/a | | |

=== 1980s ===
| Year | Actor | Film | Ref |
|---|---|---|---|
| 1980–1981 | —N/a | | |
| 1982 | **Moses Gunn** | **Ragtime** | |
| 1983 | **Scatman Crothers** | **Twilight Zone: The Movie** | |
| 1984 | —N/a | | |
| 1985 | **Denzel Washington** | **A Soldier's Story** | |
| 1986 | **Denzel Washington** | **Power** | |
| 1987 | **Mario Van Peebles** | **Heartbreak Ridge** | |
| 1987 | William Allen Young | Wisdom | |
| 1987 | Alex English | Amazing Grace and Chuck | |
| 1987 | Bill Duke | Predator | |
| 1987 | Michael Winslow | Police Academy 4 | |
| 1988 | **Arsenio Hall** | **Coming to America** | |
| 1989 | **Ossie Davis** | **Do the Right Thing** | |
| 1989 | Sammy Davis Jr. | Tap | |
| 1989 | Robert Guillaume | Lean on Me | |
| 1989 | Robert Townsend | The Mighty Quinn | |
| 1989 | Carl Lumbly | Everybody's All-American | |
| 1989 | James Earl Jones | Field of Dreams | |

=== 1990s ===
| Year | Actor | Film | Ref |
|---|---|---|---|
| 1990 | **Denzel Washington** | **Glory** | |
| 1991–1993 | —N/a | | |
| 1994 | **Al Freeman Jr.** | **Malcolm X** | |
| 1994 | Wolfgang Bodison | A Few Good Men | |
| 1994 | Delroy Lindo | Malcolm X | |
| 1994 | Denzel Washington | Much Ado About Nothing | |
| 1994 | Forest Whitaker | The Crying Game | |
| 1995 | —N/a | | |
| 1996 | **Laurence Fishburne** | **Higher Learning** | |
| 1996 | Don Cheadle | Devil in a Blue Dress | |
| 1996 | Charles S. Dutton | Cry, the Beloved Country | |
| 1996 | Cuba Gooding Jr. | Outbreak | |
| 1996 | Ice Cube | Higher Learning | |
| 1997 | **Samuel L. Jackson** | **A Time to Kill** | |
| 1997 | Charles S. Dutton | A Time to Kill | |
| 1997 | Delroy Lindo | Ransom | |
| 1997 | Blair Underwood | Set It Off | |
| 1997 | Forest Whitaker | Phenomenon | |
| 1998 | **Morgan Freeman** | **Amistad** | |
| 1998 | Don Cheadle | Rosewood | |
| 1998 | Vondie Curtis-Hall | Eve's Bayou | |
| 1998 | Danny Glover | The Rainmaker | |
| 1998 | Clarence Williams III | Hoodlum | |
| 1999 | **Morgan Freeman** | **Deep Impact** | |
| 1999 | Andre Braugher | City of Angels | |
| 1999 | Don Cheadle | Bulworth | |
| 1999 | Cuba Gooding Jr. | What Dreams May Come | |
| 1999 | Chris Rock | Lethal Weapon 4 | |

=== 2000s ===
| Year | Actor | Film | Ref |
|---|---|---|---|
| 2000 | **Terrence Howard** | **The Best Man** | |
| 2000 | Charles S. Dutton | Cookie's Fortune | |
| 2000 | LL Cool J | Deep Blue Sea | |
| 2000 | Harold Perrineau | The Best Man | |
| 2000 | Clarence Williams III | The General's Daughter | |
| 2001 | **Blair Underwood** | **Rules of Engagement** | |
| 2001 | Morgan Freeman | Nurse Betty | |
| 2001 | Wood Harris | Remember the Titans | |
| 2001 | Ving Rhames | Mission: Impossible 2 | |
| 2001 | Billy Dee Williams | The Visit | |
| 2002 | **Jamie Foxx** | **Ali** | |
| 2002 | Anthony Anderson | Two Can Play That Game | |
| 2002 | Cedric the Entertainer | Kingdom Come | |
| 2002 | Ving Rhames | Baby Boy | |
| 2002 | Mario Van Peebles | Ali | |
| 2003 | **Denzel Washington** | **Antwone Fisher** | |
| 2003 | Anthony Anderson | Barbershop | |
| 2003 | Cedric the Entertainer | Barbershop | |
| 2003 | Mos Def | Brown Sugar | |
| 2003 | Boris Kodjoe | Brown Sugar | |
| 2004 | **Morgan Freeman** | **Bruce Almighty** | |
| 2004 | Charles S. Dutton | Gothika | |
| 2004 | Djimon Hounsou | In America | |
| 2004 | Bernie Mac | Head of State | |
| 2004 | Forest Whitaker | Phone Booth | |
| 2005 | **Morgan Freeman** | **Million Dollar Baby** | |
| 2005 | Don Cheadle | Ocean's Twelve | |
| 2005 | Jamie Foxx | Collateral | |
| 2005 | Clifton Powell | Ray | |
| 2005 | C.J. Sanders | Ray | |
| 2006 | **Terrence Howard** | **Crash** | |
| 2006 | Anthony Anderson | Hustle & Flow | |
| 2006 | Don Cheadle | Crash | |
| 2006 | Ludacris | Crash | |
| 2006 | Larenz Tate | Crash | |
| 2007 | **Djimon Hounsou** | **Blood Diamond** | |
| 2007 | Harry Belafonte | Bobby | |
| 2007 | Danny Glover | Dreamgirls | |
| 2007 | Eddie Murphy | Dreamgirls | |
| 2007 | Jaden Smith | The Pursuit of Happyness | |
| 2008 | **Denzel Whitaker** | **The Great Debaters** | |
| 2008 | Chiwetel Ejiofor | Talk to Me | |
| 2008 | Nate Parker | The Great Debaters | |
| 2008 | Tyler Perry | Why Did I Get Married? | |
| 2008 | Forest Whitaker | The Great Debaters | |
| 2009 | **Columbus Short** | **Cadillac Records** | |
| 2009 | Cedric the Entertainer | Cadillac Records | |
| 2009 | Mos Def | Cadillac Records | |
| 2009 | Nate Parker | The Secret Life of Bees | |
| 2009 | Dev Patel | Slumdog Millionaire | |

=== 2010s ===
| Year | Actor | Film | Ref |
|---|---|---|---|
| 2010 | **Adam Rodriguez** | **I Can Do Bad All By Myself** | |
| 2010 | Chiwetel Ejiofor | 2012 | |
| 2010 | Danny Glover | 2012 | |
| 2010 | Lenny Kravitz | Precious | |
| 2010 | Anthony Mackie | The Hurt Locker | |
| 2011 | **Samuel L. Jackson** | **Mother and Child** | |
| 2011 | Don Cheadle | Brooklyn's Finest | |
| 2011 | Michael Ealy | For Colored Girls | |
| 2011 | Idris Elba | Takers | |
| 2011 | Justin Timberlake | The Social Network | |
| 2012 | **Mike Epps** | **Jumping the Broom** | |
| 2012 | Don Cheadle | The Guard | |
| 2012 | Anthony Mackie | The Adjustment Bureau | |
| 2012 | Charles Parnell | Pariah | |
| 2012 | Jeffrey Wright | The Ides of March | |
| 2013 | **Samuel L. Jackson** | **Django Unchained** | |
| 2013 | Don Cheadle | Flight | |
| 2013 | Dwight Henry | Beasts of the Southern Wild | |
| 2013 | Lenny Kravitz | The Hunger Games | |
| 2013 | David Oyelowo | Middle of Nowhere | |
| 2014 | **David Oyelowo** | **Lee Daniels' The Butler** | |
| 2014 | Morris Chestnut | The Best Man Holiday | |
| 2014 | Terrence Howard | The Best Man Holiday | |
| 2014 | Terrence Howard | Lee Daniels' The Butler | |
| 2014 | Cuba Gooding Jr. | Lee Daniels' The Butler | |
| 2015 | **Common** | **Selma** | |
| 2015 | Cedric the Entertainer | Top Five | |
| 2015 | Danny Glover | Beyond the Lights | |
| 2015 | André Holland | Selma | |
| 2015 | Wendell Pierce | Selma | |
| 2016 | **O'Shea Jackson Jr.** | **Straight Outta Compton** | |
| 2016 | Chiwetel Ejiofor | The Martian | |
| 2016 | Idris Elba | Beasts of No Nation | |
| 2016 | Corey Hawkins | Straight Outta Compton | |
| 2016 | Forest Whitaker | Southpaw | |
| 2017 | **Mahershala Ali** | **Moonlight** | |
| 2017 | Chadwick Boseman | Captain America: Civil War | |
| 2017 | Alano Miller | Loving | |
| 2017 | David Oyelowo | Queen of Katwe | |
| 2017 | Trevante Rhodes | Moonlight | |
| 2018 | **Idris Elba** | **Thor: Ragnarok** | |
| 2018 | Nnamdi Asomugha | Crown Heights | |
| 2018 | Sterling K. Brown | Marshall | |
| 2018 | Laurence Fishburne | Last Flag Flying | |
| 2018 | Lil Rel Howery | Get Out | |
| 2019 | **Michael B. Jordan** | **Black Panther** | |
| 2019 | Mahershala Ali | Green Book | |
| 2019 | Winston Duke | Black Panther | |
| 2019 | Brian Tyree Henry | If Beale Street Could Talk | |
| 2019 | Russell Hornsby | The Hate U Give | |

=== 2020s ===
| Year | Actor | Film | Ref |
|---|---|---|---|
| 2020 | **Jamie Foxx** | **Just Mercy** | |
| 2020 | Sterling K. Brown | Waves | |
| 2020 | Tituss Burgess | Dolemite Is My Name | |
| 2020 | Leslie Odom Jr. | Harriet | |
| 2020 | Wesley Snipes | Dolemite Is My Name | |
| 2021 | **Chadwick Boseman** | **Da 5 Bloods** | |
| 2021 | Aldis Hodge | One Night in Miami... | |
| 2021 | Clarke Peters | Da 5 Bloods | |
| 2021 | Colman Domingo | Ma Rainey's Black Bottom | |
| 2021 | Glynn Turman | Ma Rainey's Black Bottom | |
| 2022 | **Daniel Kaluuya** | **Judas and the Black Messiah** | |
| 2022 | Algee Smith | Judas and the Black Messiah | |
| 2022 | Delroy Lindo | The Harder They Fall | |
| 2022 | Idris Elba | The Harder They Fall | |
| 2022 | Lakeith Stanfield | The Harder They Fall | |
| 2023 | **Tenoch Huerta** | **Black Panther: Wakanda Forever** | |
| 2023 | John Boyega | The Woman King | |
| 2023 | Jalyn Hall | Till | |
| 2023 | Aldis Hodge | Black Adam | |
| 2023 | Cliff Smith | On the Come Up | |
| 2024 | **Colman Domingo** | **The Color Purple** | |
| 2024 | Sterling K. Brown | American Fiction | |
| 2024 | Jamie Foxx | They Cloned Tyrone | |
| 2024 | Corey Hawkins | The Color Purple | |
| 2024 | Glynn Turman | Rustin | |
| 2025 | **Denzel Washington** | **Gladiator II** | |
| 2025 | Brian Tyree Henry | The Fire Inside | |
| 2025 | David Alan Grier | The American Society of Magical Negroes | |
| 2025 | Corey Hawkins | The Piano Lesson | |
| 2025 | Samuel L. Jackson | The Piano Lesson | |
| 2026 | **Delroy Lindo** | **Sinners** | |
| 2026 | ASAP Rocky | Highest 2 Lowest | |
| 2026 | Damson Idris | F1 | |
| 2026 | Jeffrey Wright | Highest 2 Lowest | |
| 2026 | Miles Caton | Sinners | |

== Multiple wins and nominations ==
=== Wins ===
4 wins

- Morgan Freeman
- Denzel Washington

3 wins

- Samuel L. Jackson

2 wins

- Terrence Howard

=== Nominations ===
8 nominations

- Don Cheadle

5 nominations

- Morgan Freeman
- Denzel Washington
- Forest Whitaker

4 nominations

- Cedric the Entertainer
- Charles S. Dutton
- Idris Elba
- Danny Glover
- Terrence Howard
- Samuel L. Jackson
- Delroy Lindo

3 nominations

- Anthony Anderson
- Chiwetel Ejiofor
- Cuba Gooding Jr.
- Corey Hawkins
- David Oyelowo

2 nominations

- Mahershala Ali
- Chadwick Boseman
- Sterling K. Brown
- Mos Def
- Colman Domingo
- Jamie Foxx
- Aldis Hodge
- Djimon Hounsou
- Lenny Kravitz
- Anthony Mackie
- Brian Tyree Henry
- Blair Underwood
- Nate Parker
- Mario Van Peebles
- Ving Rhames
- Clarence Williams III
- Jeffrey Wright
