= Strung =

2026 thriller film by Malcolm D. Lee

- Official release poster
- Directed by: Malcolm D. Lee
- Written by: Alan B. McElroy
- Produced by: Tyler Perry; Jason Blum; Tim Palen; Malcolm D. Lee; Dominique Telson
- Starring: Chloe Bailey; Lynn Whitfield; Lucien Laviscount; Anna Diop
- Cinematography: Greg Gardiner
- Edited by: Paul Millspaugh
- Music by: Ali Shaheed Muhammad; Adrian Younge
- Production companies: Peachtree & Vine; Blumhouse Productions
- Distributed by: Peacock
- Release dates: May 27, 2026 (ABFF); June 26, 2026 (United States)
- Running time: 119 minutes
- Country: United States
- Language: English

Strung is a 2026 American psychological thriller film directed by Malcolm D. Lee and written by Alan B. McElroy. It stars Chloe Bailey, Lynn Whitfield, Lucien Laviscount, Anna Diop, Coco Jones, and Romy Woods. Tyler Perry and Jason Blum serve as producers through their Peachtree & Vine and Blumhouse Productions banners, respectively, in association with Blackmaled Productions. The film follows Laila (played by Bailey), a struggling violinist who accepts a live-in tutoring job for a wealthy, elite family and discovers a web of dark secrets.

Strung premiered at the American Black Film Festival on May 27, 2026, and was released on June 26, 2026 by Peacock.

== Cast ==
- Chloe Bailey as Laila Calloway
- Lynn Whitfield as Audra Jelani
- Lucien Laviscount as Marcus Walker
- Anna Diop as Imani Walker
- Coco Jones as Jasmine
- Romy Woods as Zuri
- Donna Biscoe as Charmaine Stewart
- Pardison Fontaine as Reginald Garvey Bell (RGB)
- Lebo Mashile as Femi
- Langley Kirkwood as Erik

== Production ==
=== Development ===
On October 1, 2021, it was reported that Alan B. McElroy would write and direct Help, with Jason Blum and Tyler Perry producing the film. On May 16, 2025, it was announced that Chloe Bailey, Lynn Whitfield, Lucien Laviscount, Anna Diop, Coco Jones, and Romy Woods would star in the film, with Malcolm D. Lee replacing McElroy as the director.

=== Filming ===
Principal photography was reported to be beginning in Cape Town, South Africa on March 7, 2025, prior to the announcement of the cast.

=== Music ===
Ali Shaheed Muhammad and Adrian Younge composed the score for the film.

== Release ==
Strung premiered at the American Black Film Festival on May 27, 2026, and was released on June 26, 2026 by Peacock.

== Reception ==
On the review aggregator website Rotten Tomatoes, 31% of 16 critics' reviews are positive, with an average rating of 3.5/10.
