= Nia Long =

American actress (born 1970)

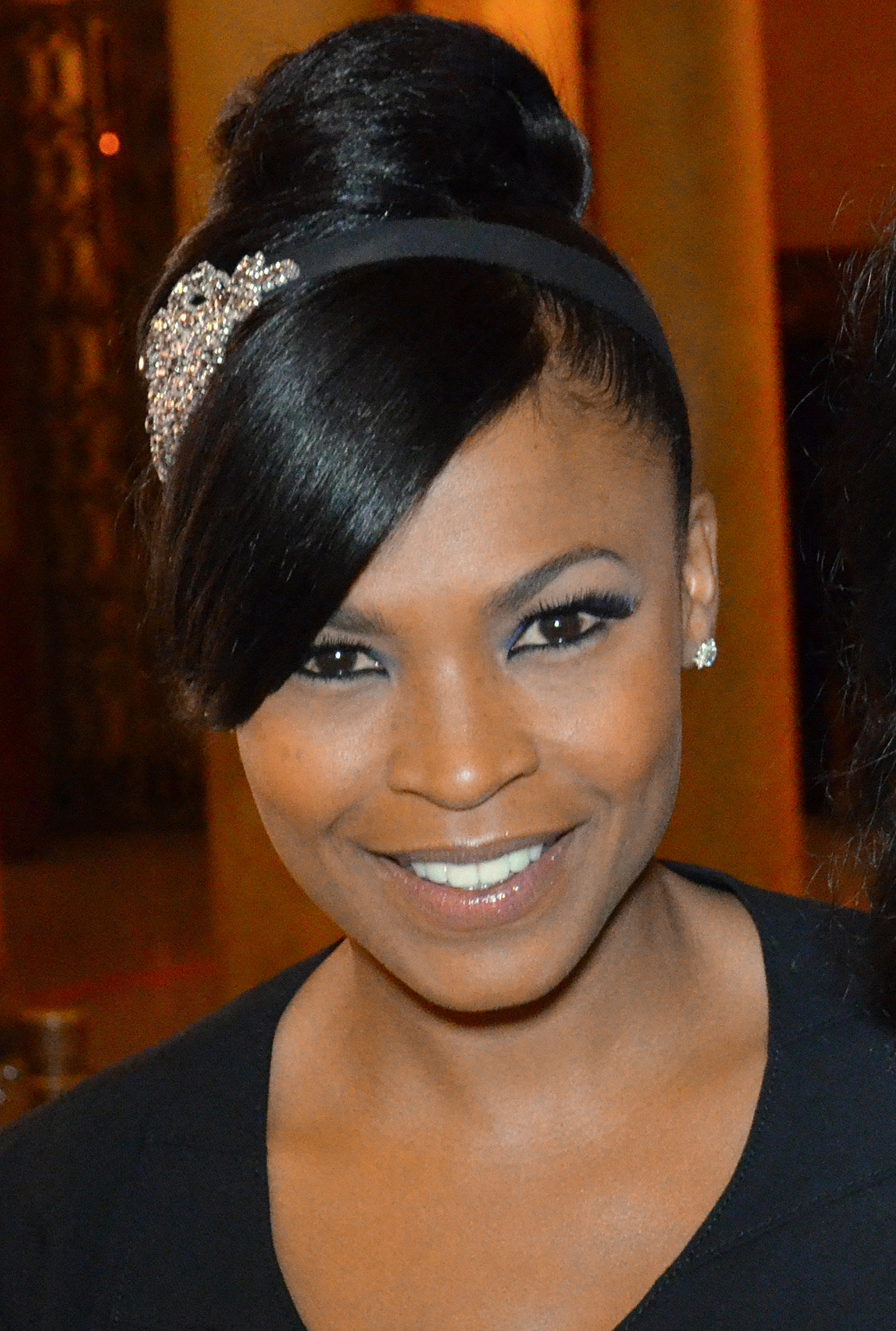
- Long in 2012
- Born: Nia Talita Long; October 30, 1970 (age 56); New York City, U.S.
- Education: Westchester High School
- Occupation: Actress
- Years active: 1986–present
- Partner: Ime Udoka (2010–2022)
- Children: 2
- Relatives: Sommore (half-sister)

Nia Talita Long (born October 30, 1970) is an American actress. Best known for her work in black cinema, Long rose to prominence after starring in the film Boyz n the Hood (1991), and for her portrayal of Beullah "Lisa" Wilkes on the NBC sitcom The Fresh Prince of Bel-Air (1991–1995). Long then appeared in the films Friday (1995), Love Jones (1997), and Soul Food (1997).

Long is known for her roles in the films The Best Man (1999), Big Momma's House (2000) and the Michael Jackson biopic Michael (2026), where she portrayed his mother Katherine Jackson. On television, Long portrayed Sasha Monroe on the crime drama series Third Watch (2003–2005) and has starred on the Fox drama series Empire (2017), and the CBS action series NCIS: Los Angeles (2017–2018). Long has received several accolades, including two NAACP Image Awards and a Black Reel Award.

== Early life ==
Long was born on October 30, 1970, in Brooklyn to Talita Long (née Gillman), a teacher and printmaker, and Doughtry Long, a Black American high school teacher and poet. Her mother is of Trinidadian descent. Long has an older half-sister, the actress and comedian known as Sommore. When Long was two years old, her parents divorced. Long accompanied her mother, who moved to Iowa City, to study fine arts.

When Long was seven, her mother moved to South Los Angeles, where she planned to marry. Doughtry and his fiancé called off the wedding, but Talita chose to stay in Los Angeles. Long's father resided in Trenton, New Jersey. She was bused from South LA to Paseo Del Rey Elementary School in Playa Del Rey from third grade through sixth grade and attended St. Mary's Academy in Inglewood, California. In addition to her academic classes, Long studied ballet, tap, jazz, gymnastics, guitar, and acting. She graduated from Westchester High School in Los Angeles in 1989.

== Career ==
Long's acting coach was Betty Bridges, better known as the mother of Diff'rent Strokes star Todd Bridges. Her earliest role was in the Disney television film The B.R.A.T. Patrol alongside Sean Astin, Tim Thomerson and Brian Keith. Her first notable role on television was a three-year contract role as Kathryn "Kat" Speakes on the soap opera Guiding Light. Long portrayed Kat from 1991 to 1994. Long also played Brandi in Boyz n the Hood. The film excited Long, who was doing her "first real movie role". It also helped Long build her confidence as an actress. "It introduced me to the world in a way that it was okay for me to be who I am and still find success," she added. "I didn't have to conform to anything." From 1994 to 1995, she played Will Smith's girlfriend and fiancée Beulah "Lisa" Wilkes on The Fresh Prince of Bel-Air. Jada Pinkett Smith was supposed to play Lisa, but was too short for the role (opposite a 6'2" Will Smith), thus leaving Long to take the part. Also, in the second season of the show (episode 8 – "She Ain't Heavy" 1992), Long appeared as Claudia, a love interest of Smith's, alongside Queen Latifah.

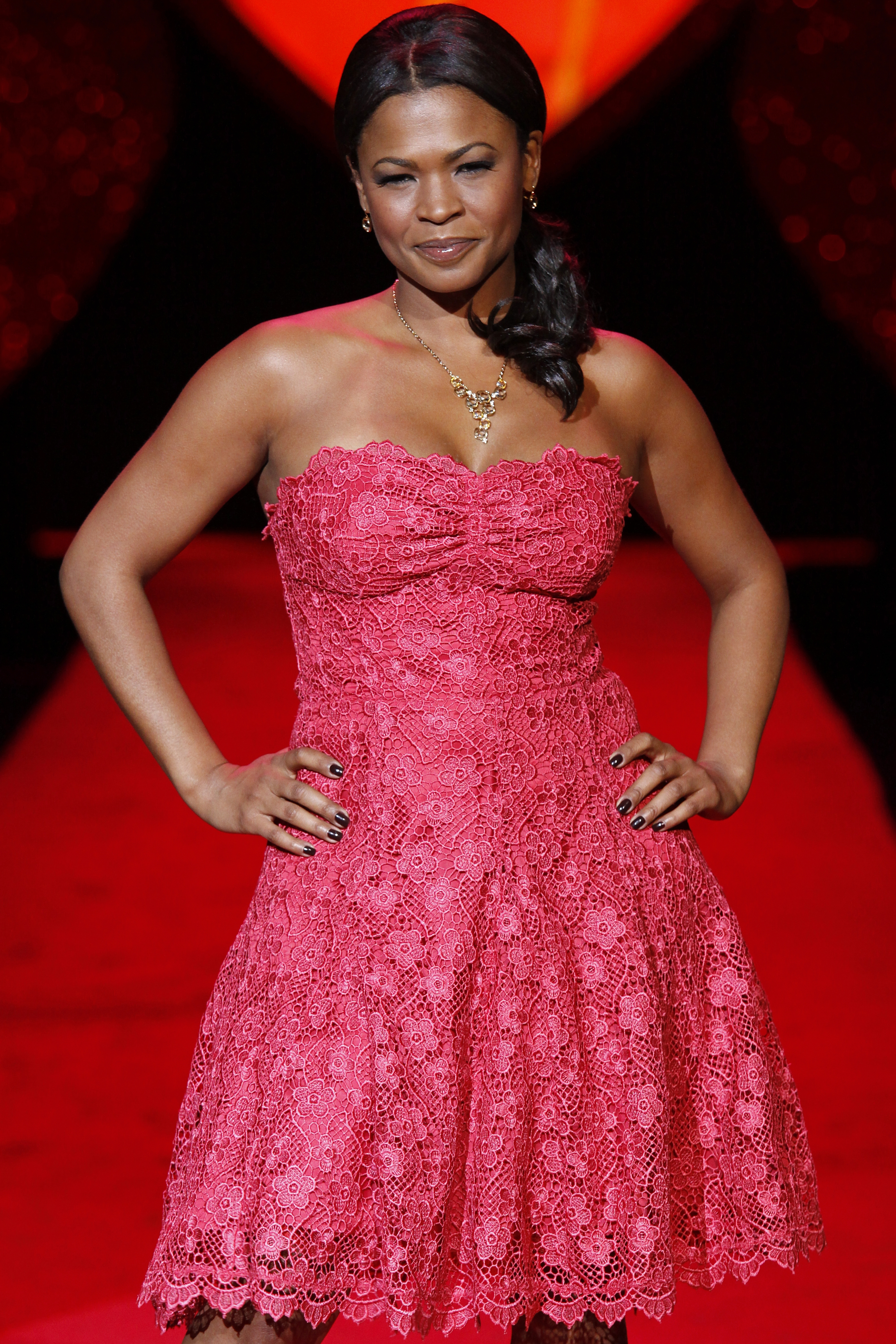
Long in 2009

In 2000, Long auditioned for the role of Alex Munday in Charlie's Angels, but did not get the part because she "looked too sophisticated and too old next to Drew Barrymore." The role was eventually given to Lucy Liu. In 2003, Long joined the cast of the drama Third Watch, where she played NYPD officer Sasha Monroe, continuing until the series finale in 2005. In 2005 and 2006, Long appeared on Everwood, and guest-starred on Boston Legal during its 2006–2007 season. She then starred alongside Michael Vartan and Dylan McDermott in Big Shots from 2007 to 2008. In 2016, Long was cast as Giuliana, a Las Vegas club owner, in a recurring role on the TV series Empire.

Long has had supporting roles in a number of films such as Friday and Made in America. She has also played a leading role, or was a member of the primary ensemble, in several films, including Soul Food, Love Jones, Boiler Room, Big Momma's House, Are We There Yet?, and The Best Man. Ice Cube has starred with her in four films, while fellow Westchester High alum Regina King has starred with her in two. Long has also starred alongside Michael Beach in the film Soul Food and on the TV series Third Watch.

Long made a cameo appearance in the video for Kanye West's "Touch the Sky". She also directed Yolanda Adams's video for "This Too Shall Pass". Long won an NAACP Image Award for Outstanding Actress in a Drama Series in 2004 for her performance on Third Watch. She co-directed and appeared in Ashanti's music video, "Baby", and made a guest appearance on the sitcom Living Single during its first season. She originally voiced Roberta Tubbs on The Cleveland Show before being replaced by Reagan Gomez-Preston.

Long later appeared in the 2013 film The Best Man Holiday, reprising her role from the original 1999 film. Unlike the original film, however, her character is in an interracial relationship with a white man. After Long was revealed to be pursuing an interracial relationship in the film, she explained: "We're living in a modern world where it happens and it's OK and it's no disrespect to any black man. I love black men, but the reality is the sistahs are marrying white men and the brothas are marrying white women and that's the world that we live in and it's not to be judged, and if it works for you then embrace it". Director Malcolm D. Lee also supported the interracial relationship being portrayed in the film: "African-American women who are extremely successful can't always find black male counterparts on that level so it's a little bit of a reflection of reality that black women are starting to date outside their race — and why not?"

In July 2020, Long starred in the Netflix psychological thriller Fatal Affair. In 2022, Long starred in the Peacock miniseries The Best Man: The Final Chapters, once again reprising her role from the previous films.

She played Katherine Jackson in the Michael Jackson biopic Michael (2026).

== Personal life ==
Long contributes her time to the Sterling Children's Home in Barbados as a motivational speaker.

In 2010, Long started dating then–National Basketball Association player Ime Udoka. Together, they have a son, born in 2011. Long also has an older son, born in 2000, from a previous relationship. Long and Udoka became engaged in 2015, though Long stated she had no plans to marry. The couple split in December 2022 after Udoka, who had become head coach of the Boston Celtics, was revealed to have had an affair with a Celtics staff member.

== Filmography ==
=== Film ===
Year	Title	Role	Notes
1990	Buried Alive	Fingers	
1991	Boyz n the Hood	Brandi	
1993	Made in America	Zora Mathews	
1995	Friday	Debbie	
1997	Love Jones	Nina Mosley	
1997	Hav Plenty	Trudy	
1997	Soul Food	Robyn "Bird" Joseph	
1998	Butter	Carmen Jones	
1998	The Secret Laughter of Women	Nimi Da Silva	
1999	In Too Deep	Myra	
1999	The Best Man	Jordan Armstrong	
1999	Stigmata	Donna Chadway	
1999	Held Up	Rae	
2000	The Broken Hearts Club: A Romantic Comedy	Leslie	
2000	Boiler Room	Abbie Halpert	
2000	Big Momma's House	Sherry Pierce	
	If These Walls Could Talk 2	Karen	
2003	BAADASSSSS!	Sandra	
2004	Alfie	Lonette	
2005	Are We There Yet?	Suzanne Kingston	
2006	Big Momma's House 2	Sherry Pierce-Turner	
2007	Premonition	Annie	
2007	Are We Done Yet?	Suzanne Persons	
2008	Gospel Hill	Yvonne Palmer	
2010	Mooz-lum	Safiyah	
2013	The Best Man Holiday	Jordan Armstrong	
2014	The Single Moms Club	May Miller	
2016	Keanu	Hannah	
2017	Roxanne Roxanne	Peggy	
2017	Lemon	Cleo	
	Beaches	Hilary Whitney	
2019	47 Meters Down: Uncaged	Jennifer	
2020	The Banker	Eunice Garrett	
2020	Fatal Affair	Ellie Warren	
2020	Life in a Year	Catherine	
2022	Look Both Ways	Lucy Galloway	
2023	You People	Fatima Mohammed	
2023	Missing	Grace	
2026	Michael	Katherine Jackson	Debut film
2027	Get Lite †	TBA	Filming

=== Television ===
Year	Title	Role	Notes
1986	227	Girl	Episode: "Slam Dunked"
1986	The Disney Sunday Movie	Darla Perkins	Episode: "The B.R.A.T Patrol"
1991	The Fresh Prince of Bel-Air	Claudia	Episode: "She Ain't Heavy"
1991–1993	Guiding Light	Katherine "Kat" Speakes	Regular cast
1993	Living Single	Stacey Evans	Episode: "Love Takes a Holiday"
1994–1995	The Fresh Prince of Bel-Air	Beullah "Lisa" Wilkes	Recurring cast (season 5)
1995	Live Shot	Ramona Greer	Recurring cast
1996	ER	Christy Wilson	Episode: "Baby Shower"
1996	Moesha	Babysitter	Episode: "A Concerted Effort: Part 1 & 2"
2000	If These Walls Could Talk 2	Karen	TV movie
2001–2002	Judging Amy	Andrea Solomon	Recurring cast (season 3)
2002	Sightings: Heartland Ghost	Lou	TV movie
2003–2005	Third Watch	Officer Sasha Monroe	Main cast (season 5–6)
2006	Everwood	Cassie	Episode: "Truth"
2007	Boston Legal	Vanessa Walker	Recurring cast (season 3)
2007–2008	Big Shots	Katie Graham	Main cast
2009	Celebrity Ghost Stories	Herself	Episode: "Tom Arnold/Nia Long/Carni Wilson/Dee Snider"
2009–2010	The Cleveland Show	Roberta Tubbs (voice)	Main cast (season 1)
2010	Black Girls Rock!	Herself/Host	Main host
2011	Chase	Melissa Randolph	Episode: "Narco: Part 2"
2013	House of Lies	Tamara	Recurring cast (season 2)
2014	The Divide	Billie Page	Main cast
2015–2016	Real Husbands of Hollywood	Herself	Guest cast (season 4–5)
2016	Trumpet Awards	Herself/Host	Main host
2016	Uncle Buck	Alexis Smith-Russell	Main cast
2017	Hand of God	Izzy	Recurring cast (season 2)
2017	Dear White People	Neika Hobbs	Recurring cast (season 1)
2017	Empire	Giuliana 'Giusi' Green	Recurring cast (season 3)
2017	Beaches	Hillary Whitney	TV movie
2017–2018	NCIS: Los Angeles	E.A.D. Shay Mosley	Main cast (season 9–10)
2018	Uncensored	Herself	Episode: "Nia Long"
2018	Unsung Hollywood	Herself	Episode: "The Best Man"
2018	The Goldbergs	Lucy Somers	Episode: "1990-Something"
2020	Entertainment Tonight	Herself/Guest co-host	Episode: "Disney Live Action Mulan Exclusive!"
2020	blackAF	Lavette	Recurring cast
2022	Let the World See	Mamie Till-Mobley	Main cast
2022	The Best Man: The Final Chapters	Jordan Armstrong	Main cast
2025	Number One on the Call Sheet	Herself	Episode: "Black Leading Women in Hollywood"

=== Music videos ===
Year	Song	Artist	Notes
1991	"Do Me (remix)"	Bell Biv DeVoe	bass player
1995	"Keep Their Heads Ringin'"	Dr. Dre	Dancer
1997	"Iggin' Me"	Chico DeBarge	Girlfriend
2002	"Baby"	Ashanti	
2005	"Touch the Sky"	Kanye West featuring Lupe Fiasco	
2008	"Long Distance Girlfriend"	Heavy D	
2015	"California Roll"	Snoop Dogg featuring Stevie Wonder	Woman in Theatre
2025	"Darling, I"	Tyler, the Creator	

=== Documentary ===
Year	Title
2004	The N-Word
2009	Good Hair
2011	Kiss and Tell: The History of Black Romance in Movie

== Awards and nominations ==
Institution	Category	Year	Work	Result
American Black Film Festival	Best Actress	1998	Love Jones	Nominated
American Black Film Festival	Star of the Year	2000	—N/a	Won
American Black Film Festival	Best Actress	2014	The Best Man Holiday	Won
American Black Film Festival	Best Ensemble Cast	2014	The Best Man Holiday	Won
BET Comedy Awards	Outstanding Supporting Actress in a Theatrical Film	2005	Alfie	Nominated
Black Reel Awards	Outstanding Actress	2000	The Best Man	Won
Black Reel Awards	Outstanding Supporting Actress	2001	Boiler Room	Nominated
Black Reel Awards	Outstanding Supporting Actress	2005	Alfie	Nominated
Black Reel Awards	Outstanding Actress	2012	Mooz-lum	Nominated
Black Reel Awards	Outstanding Actress	2014	The Best Man Holiday	Nominated
Black Reel Awards	Outstanding Actress, TV Movie or Limited Series	2018	Beaches	Nominated
Blockbuster Entertainment Awards	Favorite Actress – Comedy	2001	Big Momma's House	Nominated
NAACP Image Awards	Outstanding Supporting Actress in a Comedy Series	1996	The Fresh Prince of Bel-Air	Nominated
NAACP Image Awards	Outstanding Actress in a Motion Picture	1998	Love Jones	Nominated
NAACP Image Awards	Outstanding Actress in a Motion Picture	2000	The Best Man	Won
NAACP Image Awards	Outstanding Actress in a Television Movie, Mini-Series or Dramatic Special	2001	If These Walls Could Talk 2	Nominated
NAACP Image Awards	Outstanding Actress in a Motion Picture	2001	Big Momma's House	Nominated
NAACP Image Awards	Outstanding Actress in a Drama Series	2004	Third Watch	Won
NAACP Image Awards	Outstanding Actress in a Drama Series	2005	Third Watch	Won
NAACP Image Awards	Outstanding Supporting Actress in a Comedy Series	2014	House of Lies	Nominated
NAACP Image Awards	Outstanding Supporting Actress in a Motion Picture	2021	The Banker	Nominated
