= Shane Evans (artist) =

American writer

Shane W. Evans
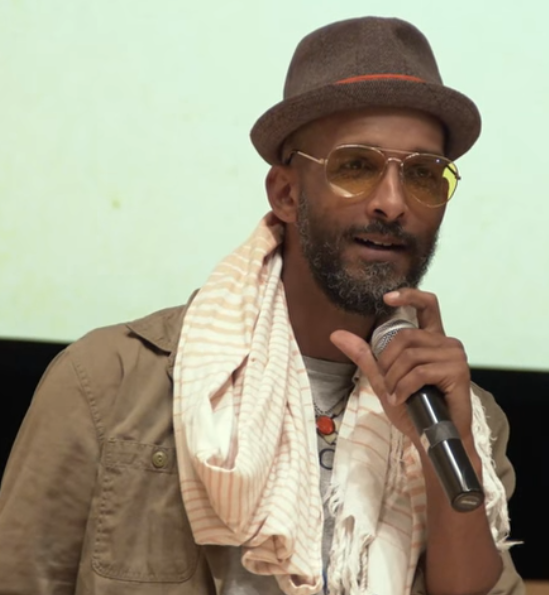
- Lecturing at the San Francisco Public Library in 2018
- Education: Syracuse University
- Occupations: Writer, artist, storyteller, musician
- Awards: Orbis Pictus Award; Boston Globe-Horn Book Award

Shane W. Evans is an American children's book author, illustrator, painter, storyteller, and musician born in New York. He attended the Syracuse University School of Visual and Performing Arts and majored in illustration. Evans' work has been featured on The Oprah Winfrey Show, The Today Show, Reading Rainbow, and Late Night with David Letterman.

Evans is the recipient of the Orbis Pictus Award for Outstanding Non-Fiction for Children and the Boston Globe-Horn Book Award. In 2002, he was chosen by First Lady Laura Bush to be honored at the 2002 National Book Festival. He illustrated the Shanna book series by Jean Marzollo, which was adapted into a Disney cartoon and then spun off into a television show called Shane's Kindergarten Countdown.

Evans has illustrated multiple children's books written by his friend, actor Taye Diggs.

== Background ==
Evans is the mixed-race child of parents who come from different cultural backgrounds. He also has a mixed-race daughter of his own, and this has influenced his interest in working on books that tackle the issues of growing up as a mixed-race individual.

Evans went to school in Buffalo and Rochester and later attended Syracuse University School of Visual and Performing Arts where he majored in illustration. He was interested in art from a young age and went to school with notable artists like Taye Diggs, Jesse Martin, and Tweet.

Evans spent some time working as a designer for Hallmark Cards and Rolling Stone and illustrated over 30 children's books before he opened up his own studio at 31st and Holmes in Kansas City, MO. Named Dream Studio, it was designed to be a 2,200 square foot work space for Shane, an art gallery, a music venue, and a community gathering space.

== Work ==
Evans' primary mediums for illustration are oil, pen, ink, and computer. He is inspired by his travels to places around the world like West Africa, Europe, Japan, China, and South America. When he began illustrating children's books, he knew there was a need for books that represented children and people of color.

Children's books he has illustrated include:

- Shaq and the Beanstalk and Other Very Tall Tales by Shaquille O'Neal
- Osceola: Memories of a Sharecropper's Daughter by Alan Govenar (2000)
- Homemade Love by bell hooks (2002)
- No More! Stories and Songs of Slave Resistance by Doreen Rappaport (2005)
- When Harriet Met Sojourner by Catherine Clinton (2007)
- Chocolate Me! by Taye Diggs
- Olu's Dream by Shane Evans (2009)
- Underground by Shane Evans (2011)
- We March! by Shane Evans (2012)
- I Love You More Than by Taye Diggs (2018)
- 28 Days: Moments in Black History that Changed the World by Charles R. Smith (2019)
- Hands Up! by Breanna J. McDaniel (2019)
- Big Papa and the Time Machine by Daniel Bernstrom (2020)
- My Friend! by Taye Diggs (2021)

He also plays guitar.
