= The Best Man Holiday =

2013 American comedy-drama film

- Theatrical release poster
- Directed by: Malcolm D. Lee
- Written by: Malcolm D. Lee
- Based on: Characters by Malcolm D. Lee
- Produced by: Malcolm D. Lee; Sean Daniel
- Starring: Morris Chestnut; Taye Diggs; Regina Hall; Terrence Howard; Sanaa Lathan; Nia Long; Harold Perrineau; Millie Davis; Shailyn Pierre-Dixon; Chris Williams
- Cinematography: Greg Gardiner
- Edited by: Paul Millspaugh
- Music by: Stanley Clarke
- Production companies: Blackmaled Productions; Sean Daniel Company
- Distributed by: Universal Pictures
- Release date: November 15, 2013
- Running time: 123 minutes
- Country: United States
- Language: English
- Budget: $17 million
- Box office: $72.8 million

The Best Man Holiday is a 2013 American Christmas comedy-drama film written, co-produced and directed by Malcolm D. Lee. A sequel to Lee's The Best Man (1999), it stars Morris Chestnut, Taye Diggs, Regina Hall, Terrence Howard, Sanaa Lathan, Nia Long, Harold Perrineau, Monica Calhoun and Melissa De Sousa, all reprising their roles from the previous film. Along with Lee, the film was produced by Sean Daniel.

Highly anticipated, the project was announced in October 2011 and principal photography began in April 2013 in Toronto, Ontario. The Best Man Holiday was released on November 15, 2013, by Universal Pictures. It received positive reviews from critics, who praised the performances of the cast, Lee's direction and the dramatic elements, with some criticism aimed at the screenplay. It was a commercial success, grossing $72.8 million worldwide on a production budget of $17 million.

The film received multiple accolades and nominations, including being nominated four times at the 45th NAACP Image Awards for Outstanding Motion Picture, Outstanding Supporting Actor in a Motion Picture (Chestnut and Howard) and Outstanding Directing in a Motion Picture (Lee).

== Plot ==
15 years after his blockbuster debut novel, Harper Stewart has writer's block and financial difficulties from being laid off from NYU and fertility treatments for his now-pregnant wife Robyn. Harper's agent suggests he write a biography of his former best friend and New York Giants superstar Lance Sullivan, who is set to retire. Though on speaking terms, Lance keeps Harper at a distance. Harper reluctantly agrees to do it, but in secret.

Meanwhile, Lance's wife Mia has invited Harper, Robyn and the rest of the gang for Christmas: Julian "Murch" Murchison and wife Candace Sparks, her best friend Jordan Armstrong (and Jordan's white boyfriend, Brian McDonald), Quentin "Q" Spivey, and Shelby Taylor. Shelby is a prominent reality television star on the hit The Real Housewives franchise. Q is a successful brand manager, heavily connected to prominent celebrities. Jordan is a producer at MSNBC, winning several Emmys. Julian runs a renowned school with former stripper Candace as his head of admissions. His main donor abruptly pulls his funding from the school when he learns of Candace's past. Julian finds a YouTube video of her stripping and accepting money for sex at a fraternity party, which he desperately tries to hide from Candace and the rest of the gang.

As the friends catch up, old tensions resurface. Harper awkwardly attempts to mend his friendship with Lance while discreetly gaining research for the biography. Shelby presses Murch to rekindle their relationship in the wake of his and Candace's marriage. Robyn struggles to bond with Jordan, knowing her history with Harper. During a pajama party, the gang has a good time, with the men dancing and lip-syncing to New Edition's "Can You Stand the Rain", which Mia sees has worked to patch up old wounds between Lance and Harper. Harper later finds Mia downstairs vomiting blood; she admits her terminal cancer diagnosis and asks him to help Lance accept it.

The next morning, Q and Shelby accidentally switch phones and she finds Candace's video. She tries to coerce Julian into resuming their relationship but he refuses. Soon afterwards, Candace confronts Shelby, leading to a physical altercation after which Candace leaves with the kids. Later, she returns and reconciles with Julian. When Brian has to leave to visit his family in Vermont for Christmas, Jordan dismissively states that she doesn't need him.

The ladies are preparing for a spa day when Mia collapses. This forces Harper to tell everyone about Mia's condition and everyone is supportive.

While Harper is wrapping the children's Christmas gifts, Lance approaches him and they reminisce about their college days, seemingly reconciling. The next day, as the gang volunteers at a shelter, Lance finds Harper's iPad and journal in Mia's purse, and a mock book cover for his unauthorized biography on the tablet. Lance angrily confronts Harper, telling him to stay away from him and his family. Mia fails to calm him down. Lance takes her home, leaving Q and Harper behind where Harper finally breaks down and admits the truth of his financial situation. After giving humble words of comfort to Harper, Q vows to take care of his debts as a friendly favor.

Lance is still heated over the biography when Mia challenges him to face reality. Mia accepts responsibility for Lance and Harper's longtime feud due to her one-night stand with Harper back in college, (Note: As seen in The Best Man (1999)) which she knew would hurt Lance due to his numerous infidelities. Mia takes off her wig, forcing him to also acknowledge the severity of her condition. On Christmas Day, Jordan apologizes to Brian over the phone for her harsh words, unaware that Brian has already arrived to see her. Lance is scheduled to play a game, but he defiantly refuses, believing that caring for Mia is more important. Mia convinces him to play, and his first half is uneventful. When Lance is benched and he angrily lashes out at fans and his team, Mia calls him. This inspires him to play and ultimately win the game, breaking the all-time rushing yards record. The men hurry home to take care of Mia, who dies shortly thereafter.

At the memorial service, Harper delivers a heartfelt eulogy. Lance later thanks his friend and affirms his faith in God. Harper lacks the same faith, but is encouraged, saying Lance will always be the better man between them.

Shelby gives Julian $2 million to cover the lost funding with no strings attached. Later, Brian promises to help through his contacts.

After the service, Robyn's water breaks so Lance, Harper, and Candace attempt to rush her to the hospital but get stuck in traffic; Lance delivers Harper's newborn baby girl in the backseat of his SUV, which is named Mia in tribute to Mia.

Ten months later, Harper and Lance are closer than ever, and Harper has written Lance's biography, God, Family and Football. When Lance visits Harper and Robyn in New York City, Q calls to announce his anticipated marriage but jokes that Harper had better not have slept with his bride.

== Cast ==
- Taye Diggs as Harper Stewart
- Sanaa Lathan as Robyn Stewart
- Nia Long as Jordan Armstrong
- Morris Chestnut as Lance Sullivan
- Harold Perrineau as Julian "Murch" Murchison
- Terrence Howard as Quentin "Q" Spivey
- Monica Calhoun as Mia Sullivan
- Melissa De Sousa as Shelby Taylor
- Regina Hall as Candace "Candy" Sparks
- Eddie Cibrian as Brian McDonald
- John Michael Higgins as Stan
- Isis Moore as Kennedy
- Riele Downs as Faith Sullivan
- Millie Davis as Hope
- Catherine Bruhier as Dr. Perkins
- Chris Williams as Dr. Nelson (voice)
- Shailyn Pierre-Dixon as Kelly
- Shailene Garnett as Jordan's Assistant
- Miles J Stroter as Lonnie

== Production ==
In October 2011, it was announced that a sequel to the 1999 film The Best Man was in development. On February 22, 2013, it was announced that the film would be titled The Best Man Holiday.

In March 2013, Terrence Howard revealed details about the film, saying: "I think it's going to be an amazing film and I get teary-eyed thinking about it because there's some tragedy in it. That's all I'll say...[Director and screenwriter] Malcolm Lee showed us what intelligent young black people were capable of in The Best Man I, but The Best Man II, it shows where people go, whether they're doing the right thing or the wrong thing, and how much we need each other within our community."

Principal photography began in April 2013 in Toronto, Ontario.

=== Home media ===
The Best Man Holiday was released on DVD and Blu-ray on February 11, 2014, by Universal Pictures Home Entertainment.

== Reception ==
=== Box office ===
The Best Man Holiday debuted with a $10.7 million Friday total, notably beating Thor: The Dark World for the top box office spot of that day. The Best Man Holiday did even better the next day earning $12.4 million on Saturday. It then went on to be the number two film of the weekend, taking in close to $30.6 million. It eventually earned a total of $70.5 million in the United States and $72.8 million worldwide.

=== Critical response ===
As of May 2025, the film holds a 71% approval rating on Rotten Tomatoes, based on 96 reviews with an average rating of 6/10. The site's critical consensus reads, "The Best Man Holiday manages honest laughs out of broad humor, and affects convincing drama from a deeply conventional plot." Metacritic gives the film a score of 59 out of 100, based on 30 critics, indicating "mixed or average reviews". CinemaScore reported that audiences gave the film a rare "A+" grade.

The Washington Post's Ann Hornaday gave it 2.5 stars, saying the "[s]equel is both a romp and a tearjerker... Like a long-lost soap opera emerging from a Rip Van Winkle–length hiatus, 'The Best Man Holiday' has lost none of its often baggy, saggy melodrama; luckily, when things get too soppy, Howard can be depended on for crude one-liners that land with all the more finesse thanks to his smoky, slightly stoned delivery. ...And 'The Best Man Holiday' has clearly caught up with the times, with one plot point revolving around social media run amok, off-handedly invoking everyone from Barack Obama (natch) to Melissa Harris-Perry, Olivia Pope and Robin Thicke".

== Soundtrack ==
The film's soundtrack includes songs by R. Kelly, Jordin Sparks, Mary J. Blige, Monica, Ne-Yo, Marsha Ambrosius, John Legend, Emeli Sandé, and more.

== Awards and nominations ==
Acapulco Black Film Festival

- Best Ensemble Cast (winner)
- Best Actress—Nia Long (winner)
- Best Supporting Actor—Terrence Howard (winner)
- Best Actor—Morris Chestnut (nominated)
- Movie of the Year—Malcolm D. Lee and Sean Daniel (nominated)
- Best Screenplay—Malcolm D. Lee (nominated)
- Best Supporting Actress—Sanaa Lathan (nominated)
- Best Director—Malcolm D. Lee (nominated)

14th BET Awards

- Best Movie (nominated)

2014 Black Reel Awards

- Outstanding Actress, Motion Picture—Nia Long (nominated)
- Outstanding Director, Motion Picture—Malcolm D. Lee (nominated)
- Outstanding Screenplay (Adapted or Original), Motion Picture—Malcolm D. Lee (nominated)
- Outstanding Ensemble—Julie Hutchinson (nominated)
- Outstanding Score—Stanley Clarke (nominated)

45th NAACP Image Awards

- Outstanding Motion Picture (nominated)
- Outstanding Supporting Actor in a Motion Picture—Morris Chestnut (nominated)
- Outstanding Supporting Actor in a Motion Picture—Terrence Howard (nominated)
- Outstanding Directing in a Motion Picture—Malcolm D. Lee (nominated)

== Sequel ==
On July 22, 2014, Universal announced that a third film, The Best Man Wedding, was to be released on April 15, 2016. In April 2016, the film was put on hold indefinitely.

In February 2021, Peacock gave a limited series order to a follow-up consisting of ten episodes. The Best Man: The Final Chapters is created by Lee and Dayna Lynne North, who also serve as executive producers. Chestnut, Diggs, Hall, Howard, Lathan, Long, Perrineau and De Sousa are set to reprise their roles. The 8-episode series premiered on December 22, 2022.

== See also ==
- List of black films of the 2010s
- List of Christmas films
