= The Best Man: The Final Chapters =

2022 American comedy-drama miniseries

- Genre: Comedy-drama
- Created by: Malcolm D. Lee
- Based on: Characters by Malcolm D. Lee
- Developed by: Malcolm D. Lee & Dayna Lynne North
- Starring: Morris Chestnut; Melissa De Sousa; Taye Diggs; Regina Hall; Terrence Howard; Sanaa Lathan; Nia Long; Harold Perrineau
- Music by: Robert Glasper
- Country of origin: United States
- Original language: English
- No. of episodes: 8

Production
- Executive producers: Malcolm D. Lee; Dayna Lynne North; Sean Daniel; Dominique Telson
- Producers: David Bausch; Cameron Johnson
- Cinematography: Greg Gardiner
- Editors: Kyle Gilman; Allyson Johnson; Gershon Hinkson
- Running time: 41–56 minutes
- Production companies: Blackmaled Productions; Loud Sis Productions; Universal Television

Original release
- Network: Peacock
- Release: December 22, 2022

The Best Man: The Final Chapters is an American comedy-drama television miniseries created by Malcolm D. Lee and developed by Lee and Dayna Lynne North. The series takes place a few years after The Best Man Holiday, itself a sequel to The Best Man, and it premiered on Peacock on December 22, 2022.

== Cast and characters ==
=== Main ===
- Morris Chestnut as Lance Sullivan
- Melissa De Sousa as Shelby Taylor
- Taye Diggs as Harper Stewart
- Regina Hall as Candace "Candy" Sparks-Murchison
- Terrence Howard as Quentin Spivey
- Sanaa Lathan as Robyn Stewart, Harper's wife
- Nia Long as Jordan Armstrong
- Harold Perrineau as Julian "Murch" Murchison, Candace's husband

=== Recurring ===
- Ron Canada as Wellington, Quentin's father
- Yvonna Pearson as Jasmine, a concierge at the resort in San Pierre that shares a connection with Lance
- Aaron Serotsky as Stan, Harper's literary agent
- Brandon Victor Dixon as Demetrius
- Eric Scott Ways as LJ, Lance and Mia's oldest child who comes out as non-binary

=== Special guest star ===
- Nicole Ari Parker as Xiomara Amani

=== Notable guest stars ===
- Terrence Terrell as Will
- Monica Calhoun as Mia Sullivan, Lance's deceased wife
- Michael Genet as Dr. Temple
- Tobias Truvillion as Jaha

== Episodes ==
No.	Title	Directed by	Written by	Original release date
1	"Paradise"	Malcolm D. Lee	Malcolm D. Lee & Dayna Lynne North	December 22, 2022
2	"The Wedding"	Malcolm D. Lee	Malcolm D. Lee & Dayna Lynne North	December 22, 2022
3	"Brown Girl Dreaming"	Robert Townsend	Lori Lakin Hutcherson	December 22, 2022
4	"The Invisible Man"	Malcolm D. Lee	Ayanna Floyd Davis	December 22, 2022
5	"The Party"	Charles Stone III	Teleplay by : Cameron Johnson & Lori Lakin Hutcherson; Story by : Cameron Johnson	December 22, 2022
6	"An American Marriage"	Robert Townsend	Wayne Conley & Zoe Marshall	December 22, 2022
7	"Things Fall Apart"	Stacey Muhammad	Nicole Amarteifio & Dayna Lynne North	December 22, 2022
8	"The Audacity of Hope"	Malcolm D. Lee	James Bland & Malcolm D. Lee	December 22, 2022

== Production ==
=== Development ===
On February 9, 2021, Peacock gave production a limited series order consisting of ten episodes. It is created by Malcolm D. Lee and Dayna Lynne North who are also executive producing it. Filming for the limited series began on March 14, 2022. It was filmed in New York City,Kearny New Jersey at Kearny Point, and Dominican Republic. The series is set to be released on Peacock on December 22, 2022, with all eight episodes instead of the original ten-episode order. The limited series picks up a few years after The Best Man Holiday.

=== Casting ===
Upon the limited series order announcement, Morris Chestnut, Melissa De Sousa, Taye Diggs, Regina Hall, Terrence Howard, Sanaa Lathan, Nia Long, and Harold Perrineau are set to reprise their roles from 1999's film The Best Man. On April 29, 2022, Nicole Ari Parker, Ron Canada, Brandon Victor Dixon, Michael Genet, Yvonna Pearson, Aaron Serotsky, Terrence Terrell, Tobias Truvillion, and Eric Scott Ways joined the cast in recurring roles.

== Reception ==
The review aggregator website Rotten Tomatoes reported a 91% approval rating with an average rating of 8/10, based on 11 critic reviews. Metacritic, which uses a weighted average, assigned a score of 58 out of 100 based on 4 critics, indicating "mixed or average reviews".
