= The Best Man (1999 film) =

- Theatrical release poster
- Directed by: Malcolm D. Lee
- Written by: Malcolm D. Lee
- Produced by: Spike Lee; Sam Kitt; Bill Carraro
- Starring: Taye Diggs; Nia Long; Morris Chestnut; Harold Perrineau; Terrence Howard; Sanaa Lathan; Monica Calhoun; Melissa De Sousa
- Cinematography: Frank Prinzi
- Edited by: Cara Silverman
- Music by: Stanley Clarke
- Production company: 40 Acres and a Mule Filmworks
- Distributed by: Universal Pictures
- Release date: October 22, 1999
- Running time: 120 minutes
- Country: United States
- Language: English
- Budget: $9 million
- Box office: $34.5 million

The Best Man is a 1999 American comedy drama film written and directed by Malcolm D. Lee in his directorial debut. It was produced by 40 Acres and a Mule Filmworks, with Lee's cousin, Spike Lee, serving as producer. The film stars an ensemble cast led by Taye Diggs and Nia Long, with the debut of Regina Hall. The film was released by Universal Pictures on October 22, 1999 to positive reviews from critics while grossing $34.5 million against a $9 million budget.

A Christmas-themed sequel, The Best Man Holiday, was released on November 15, 2013, with a reunited cast, followed by a limited series, The Best Man: The Final Chapters which was released on December 22, 2022.

== Plot ==
In Chicago, Harper Stewart is an up-and-coming author whose debut novel, Unfinished Business, has been selected by Oprah's Book Club. Harper's devoted girlfriend Robyn is frustrated by his unwillingness to commit to her.

Harper travels to New York City to spend the weekend with old friends from college, before they all attend the wedding of Lance Sullivan, a running back for the New York Giants, and Mia Morgan. Serving as best man, Harper reunites with his friends Julian "Murch" Murchison and Jordan Armstrong, who has passed an advance copy of Unfinished Business around their inner circle of friends – upon whom the book is based.

None of the friends approve of Murch's domineering girlfriend Shelby, and Harper chastises Quentin Spivey for being unable to settle down in a job. The weekend reveals that Quentin has always been a free spirit, Lance has renounced his womanizing behavior, Harper is unsure about remaining a bachelor, and Murch has never been able to keep a secret.

Flashbacks to their college days reveal that Lance met Mia through Harper, who almost slept with Jordan. Quentin antagonizes Lance about Mia, whom he believes has never been with another man. Learning Lance has a copy of his book, Harper worries he will discover that he and Mia had a one-night stand in college.

Confronting Harper about their mutual attraction, Jordan admits she wants to have sex with him that night, before Robyn arrives for the wedding the next day, and they share a kiss. Lance confronts Harper in the bathroom, but merely thanks him for his friendship; they are interrupted before Harper can come clean. As the groomsmen depart for the bachelor party, Jordan invites Harper to meet her later, and Murch finally stands up to Shelby.

At the party, Harper steals Lance's copy of Unfinished Business, to the disgust of Quentin, who has deduced Harper's secret. As the party gets increasingly drunk, Murch falls for one of the strippers, Candy, and Harper calls Jordan, accepting her invitation.

Finding the book in Harper's coat, Lance reads it and discovers the truth, that Mia slept with Harper in college to get back at Lance for his numerous infidelities. Enraged, he attacks Harper for his betrayal, almost throwing him off the balcony, but Quentin talks him down, and Lance calls off the wedding.

A badly beaten Harper arrives at Jordan's apartment. He blames her for circulating the book, but she berates him for airing his own dirty laundry and leading her on. The next day, Harper meets Robyn at the airport. She notices his injuries, and he confesses. Disappointed, Robyn prepares to leave, but Harper declares how much he needs her, and she reluctantly agrees to help him save the wedding.

Arriving at the church with Candy, Murch breaks up with Shelby. Lance arrives, and his friends try desperately to stop him before he can tell his parents the wedding is off. Harper – who doesn't share Lance's religious devotion – halts him by asking him to pray.

While Robyn and Jordan tend to Mia, who is oblivious to the previous night's events, Harper reasons with Lance after much difficulty and assures him of his and Mia's love. After forcing Harper to pray with him, a tearful Lance proceeds with the wedding.

Harper gives a heartfelt speech praising Mia and Lance's love that visibly moves the couple, earning Lance's forgiveness. Shelby pushes a bridesmaid out of the way to seize the bouquet, while Quentin catches the garter. Jordan finds closure with Harper, telling him Robyn is the woman for him.

On the dance floor, Harper thanks Robyn for her help and, in front of the entire wedding party, asks her to marry him; she says yes. The film ends as everyone dances the electric slide to the song "Candy" by Cameo.

In a post-credit scene, Shelby and Quentin wake up in bed together, to their shock and disgust.

== Cast ==
- Taye Diggs as Harper Stewart
- Nia Long as Jordan Armstrong
- Morris Chestnut as Lance Sullivan
- Harold Perrineau as Julian "Murch" Murchison
- Terrence Howard as Quentin Spivey
- Sanaa Lathan as Robyn Childers
- Melissa De Sousa as Shelby Taylor
- Monica Calhoun as Mia Morgan Sullivan
- Jim Moody as Uncle Skeeter
- Regina Hall as Candace "Candy" Sparks
- Jarrod Bunch as Wayne
- Victoria Dillard as Anita
- Malcolm D. Lee as Emcee
- Aleisha Allen as Flower Girl

== Reception ==
The film received mostly positive reviews from critics. The website AllMovie gave the film 3/5 stars, with reviewer Jason Clark stating that the film has "occasional moments of ripe humor, but it fails to say anything new about troubled weddings or the experience of being an upwardly mobile African-American looking for love." The film has earned a B+ average from users at the Yahoo! Movies site.

Howard's performance in particular earned much praise from film critics, and The Best Man is considered to be his breakout film. Jason Clark of AllMovie stated Howard "commands the screen with such abandon that one secretly wishes the film could have been all about his oddly captivating character".

Rotten Tomatoes gives the film a 72% positive rating based on reviews by 71 critics, with the site's consensus stating "With a strong cast and a host of well-defined characters, The Best Man is an intelligent, funny romantic comedy that marks an impressive debut for writer/director Malcolm D. Lee." Metacritic, which uses a weighted average, assigned the film a score of 61 out of 100, based on 30 critics, indicating "generally favorable" reviews.

One scholarly analysis notes that Mia, the bride-to-be, speaks for only about 15 percent of the film.

=== Box office ===
Produced on a relatively small budget of $9 million, the film went on to make over $34 million by the end of its theatrical run.

=== Awards and nominations ===
The film received numerous awards and accolades. All eight principal cast members received nominations at the 2000 NAACP Image Awards, with wins for Howard and Long, and for Outstanding Motion Picture.

2000 Black Reel Awards

- Best Actor (Theatrical)—Taye Diggs (nominated)
- Best Actress (Theatrical)—Nia Long (winner)
- Best Director (Theatrical)—Malcolm D. Lee (winner)
- Best Screenplay, Original or Adapted (Theatrical)—Malcolm D. Lee (winner)
- Best Supporting Actor (Theatrical)—Terrence Howard (nominated)

2000 Chicago Film Critics Association Awards

- Most Promising Actor—Terrence Howard (nominated)

2000 Independent Spirit Awards

- Best Supporting Male—Terrence Howard (nominated)

2000 NAACP Image Awards

- Outstanding Actor in a Motion Picture—Morris Chestnut (nominated)
- Outstanding Actor in a Motion Picture—Taye Diggs (nominated)
- Outstanding Actress in a Motion Picture—Monica Calhoun (nominated)
- Outstanding Actress in a Motion Picture—Nia Long (winner)
- Outstanding Motion Picture (winner)
- Outstanding Supporting Actor in a Motion Picture—Harold Perrineau (nominated)
- Outstanding Supporting Actor in a Motion Picture—Terrence Howard (winner)
- Outstanding Supporting Actress in a Motion Picture—Melissa De Sousa (nominated)
- Outstanding Supporting Actress in a Motion Picture—Sanaa Lathan (nominated)

== Soundtrack ==
The Best Man: Music from the Motion Picture

Soundtrack album by Various artists
- Released: October 12, 1999
- Recorded: 1998–1999
- Genres: Hip hop, R&B
- Length: 62:45
- Label: Columbia
- Producers: Bonnie Greenberg (exec.); Lisa Brown (exec.)

Singles from The Best Man: Music from the Motion Picture
- 1. "Let's Not Play the Game" Released: October 12, 1999; 2. "The Best Man I Can Be" Released: October 29, 1999

Professional ratings
Review scores
Source	Rating
Allmusic	3/5 stars

The film's soundtrack, released on October 12, 1999, by Sony Music Entertainment, peaked at number 2 on the Top R&B/Hip-Hop Albums and number 16 on the Billboard 200 in 1999.

=== Track listing ===
The Best Man: Music from the Motion Picture
No.	Title	Performer(s)	Length
1.	"What You Want"	The Roots featuring Jaguar	4:16
2.	"Let's Not Play the Game"	Maxwell	4:31
3.	"After All Is Said and Done"	Beyoncé and Marc Nelson	4:15
4.	"Poetry Girl"	Eric Benét	5:28
5.	"Liar, Liar"	LaTocha Scott	4:41
6.	"Best Man"	Faith Evans	3:26
7.	"Beautiful Girl"	Kenny Lattimore	4:04
8.	"Hit It Up"	Sporty Thievz	3:39
9.	"Turn Your Lights Down Low"	Bob Marley and Lauryn Hill	4:02
10.	"Untitled"	Meshell Ndegeocello	4:08
11.	"As My Girl"	Maxwell	4:11
12.	"Wherever You Go"	Sygnature featuring Simbi Khali	5:31
13.	"When the Shades Go Down"	Allure	4:56
14.	"The Best Man I Can Be"	Ginuwine, RL, Tyrese and Case	6:29

Notes

- The song playing during the scene where Harper and Jordan almost make love in college is "As" by Stevie Wonder, from his classic 1976 album Songs in the Key of Life. It does not appear on the soundtrack album, but appears on the soundtrack for the sequel The Best Man Holiday covered by Anthony Hamilton and British R&B vocalist Marsha Ambrosius.
- Also important to the plot of the film is the 1986 song "Candy" by Cameo (from the group's Word Up! album). Likewise, "Candy" does not appear on the soundtrack album for the film.
- Although The Roots' "What You Want" plays over the opening credits, the lyrics are edited slightly. This is necessary because the version which appears on the soundtrack album contains a major plot spoiler.

=== Weekly charts ===
Chart (1999)	Peak position
US Billboard 200	16
US Top R&B/Hip-Hop Albums (Billboard)	2

=== Certifications ===
Region	Certification	Certified units/sales
United States (RIAA)	Platinum	1,000,000^{^}
^{^} Shipments figures based on certification alone.

== Sequels ==
In 2013, Lee wrote and directed a sequel to The Best Man titled The Best Man Holiday. Chestnut, Diggs, Hall, Howard, Lathan, Long, Perrineau, Calhoun and De Sousa returned from the first film. It received positive reviews.

In February 2021, Peacock gave a limited series order to a follow-up consisting of ten episodes. The Best Man: The Final Chapters is created by Lee and Dayna Lynne North, who also serve as executive producers. Chestnut, Diggs, Hall, Howard, Lathan, Long, Perrineau and De Sousa reprised their roles. The 8-episode series premiered on December 22, 2022.
