= Let's Not Play the Game =

Single by Maxwell

from the album The Best Man - Music From The Motion Picture
- Released: October 12, 1999
- Genre: R&B
- Length: 4:32
- Label: Sony
- Songwriter(s): Hod David, Musze
- Producer(s): Musze, Hod David

Maxwell singles chronology
"Fortunate" (1999)	"Let's Not Play the Game" (1999)	"Get to Know Ya" (2001)

"Let's Not Play the Game" is a song by American R&B singer Maxwell, and is featured in the movie and soundtrack from the film The Best Man. It was released as the lead single from the film's soundtrack, and charted on Billboard's top R&B/Hip-Hop Songs.

== Charts ==
Chart (1999)	Peak position
US Billboard Hot R&B/Hip-Hop Songs	55
