= Regina Hall =

American actress (born 1970)

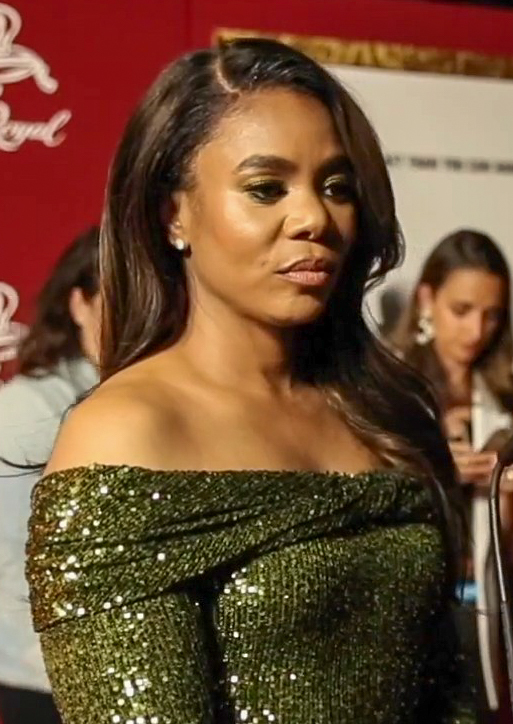
- Hall in 2019
- Born: Regina Lee Hall; December 12, 1970 (age 55); Washington, D.C., U.S.
- Education: Fordham University (BA); New York University (MA)
- Years active: 1994–present

Regina Lee Hall (born December 12, 1970) is an American actress. She gained prominence for her portrayal of Brenda Meeks in the comedy-horror Scary Movie film series. She has worked in film and television. In 2018, Hall became the first African-American to win the New York Film Critics Circle Award for Best Actress for her performance in the film Support the Girls.

Hall made her film debut in The Best Man (1999) and reprised her role in its sequel The Best Man Holiday (2014). Her film credits include Love & Basketball (2000), Think Like a Man (2012) and its sequel Think Like a Man Too (2014), Girls Trip (2017), The Hate U Give (2018), and One Battle After Another (2025). On television, she has starred in the comedy-drama series Ally McBeal (2001–2002), NBC police procedural Law & Order: LA (2010–2011), the comedy series Black Monday (2019–2021), and appeared as Ninny in Issa Rae's Insecure (2017).

== Early life ==
Hall's father Odie Hall was a contractor and electrician, her mother Ruby a teacher. After graduating from Immaculata High School, Hall enrolled at Fordham University in the Bronx, where she graduated with a bachelor's degree in communications in 1992. She enrolled at New York University, where she earned a master's degree in journalism in 1997. Reflecting on college, Hall said: "I loved being a student. I could've gone to school until I was 75 years old as long as somebody would've paid my rent. I would've been a professional student."

She wanted a career with impact and envisioned a career in writing or journalism, but Hall's first semester of graduate school changed drastically when her father died of a stroke. She began a career in the entertainment industry, starting off with a guest appearance on Sadat X's 1996 album Wild Cowboys on the track, "The Interview".

== Career ==
In 1997, Hall appeared in her first television commercial at the age of 26. Her television career began with a role on the soap opera Loving, and guest appearances on the Fox police drama New York Undercover. She played Candy in the 1999 film The Best Man. Hall reflected: "It was my very first movie. I met Sanaa Lathan on it, and we did Love and Basketball together, which was my second film. And then, at that point, I was visiting L.A. to stay and it led to a third film and a fourth film. And it was really a big deal because I'd never been on a set before."

Hall gained more recognition with her role in the comedy-horror-spoof Scary Movie (and the sequels Scary Movie 2, Scary Movie 3, and Scary Movie 4) portraying the sex-crazed Brenda Meeks, and the TV movie Disappearing Acts. The Scary Movie films are some of her best known roles. In 2001, Hall landed the role of Coretta Lipp on the prime-time drama Ally McBeal, which was originally a recurring role over several episodes but was made a main character in the fifth season of the show. A year later, she starred in the action-drama Paid in Full, a film directed by Charles Stone III. She has appeared in leading roles in films such as Malibu's Most Wanted, King's Ransom and The Honeymooners.

She appeared in the film Law Abiding Citizen in 2009. She had a role in the 2010 Danneel Harris and Arielle Kebbel film Mardi Gras. From its fall 2010 debut until a series overhaul in January 2011, Regina Hall portrayed Deputy District Attorney Evelyn Price on Law & Order: LA.

In 2012, she portrayed Candace Hall in Steve Harvey's movie Think Like a Man, a romantic comedy based on his book Act Like a Lady, Think Like a Man. Hall reprised her role as Candace Sparks in The Best Man Holiday in 2013. She believed the characters had evolved from the first film. Hall felt The Best Man Holiday was different from any sequel she had ever done before since it was not "immediate" and it had been fourteen years since the release of the original. Hall felt the first film had "the joy of the wedding" and in the sequel "they come together for the holidays, but it's deeper than that. This one's definitely different, but we still laughed. There was so much laughter behind the scenes." Hall joked about how all of the male members of the cast were married while all of the women were not, stating that Morris Chestnut was happily married while walking around "with his shirt off!"

Hall appeared in the 2014 film About Last Night, co-starring Kevin Hart. She and Hart were seen as the film's highlight as they had a "great dynamic together" and the two were credited with having the funniest lines in the film. All of the cast was seen as having a "perfect mix of charisma and likability". Jessica Herndon of the Associated Press stated "Hart and Hall are the best part of this film. They play the couple you know all too well: fiery, able to press one another's buttons and always caught in the makeup to breakup game." Negative reviews of the film also praised the pairing of Hall with Kevin Hart. Mick LaSalle of The San Francisco Chronicle expressed that Hart was "well paired for Hall, who matches him for comedy." At the time of the film's release, both Hall and Hart expressed interest in working on other projects together. About Last Night was her third ensemble film and Hall reflected that she learned from actors she worked with in ensembles.

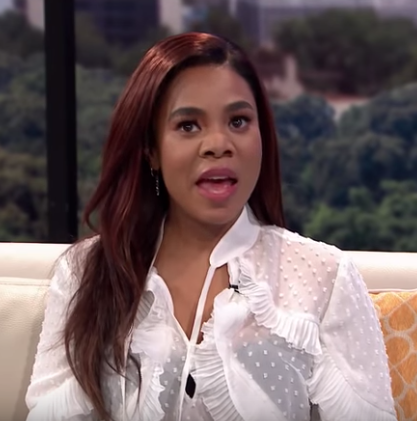
Hall interviewed in 2019

Hall reprised her role as Candace Hall in Think Like a Man Too. In July 2014, it was announced Hall would star in a Lifetime film, entitled With This Ring, with Eve and Jill Scott.

In the 2015 film People Places Things, Hall had a major role as the love interest of a newly divorced man. In 2016, Hall was in Barbershop: The Next Cut. She played the role of Angie, one of the hair stylists, alongside Ice Cube, Common, and Eve. In 2017, Hall co-starred in the comedy film Girls Trip, which became a critical and commercial success. In 2018, Hall was part of the ensemble cast of the drama film The Hate U Give, based on the 2017 novel The Hate U Give.

Hall had the lead in Support the Girls, a film directed by Andrew Bujalski. For the latter, she received critical praise, and was nominated for several awards, winning the New York Film Critics Circle Award for Best Actress. She is the first African-American to win the award. That same year she was invited to join the Academy of Motion Picture Arts and Sciences. In 2019, Hall hosted the 2019 BET Awards.

In October 2020, she signed a first-look deal with Showtime. Under the pact, Hall will develop and produce television projects via her production company, RH Negative. A mere months later, her company signed a six-film deal with ViacomCBS.

She cohosted the 94th Academy Awards with Amy Schumer and Wanda Sykes on March 27, 2022.

In October 2024, Hall inked a first-look deal with MGM Alternative, the division of Amazon MGM Studios. Under the agreement, Hall and her team will develop and produce original unscripted true crime, ensemble docuseries and game genres.

In 2019, Hall received an honorary doctorate degree from Dillard University. Furthermore, in May 2025, she received an honorary Doctorate of Fine Arts from her alma mater, Fordham University. This honor from Fordham University recognized her exceptional acting career and unwavering commitment to social justice.

In 2025, Hall appeared in the Paul Thomas Anderson epic action thriller film One Battle After Another as the character Deandra.

== Personal life ==
Around 2004, Hall's mother was diagnosed with scleroderma, a rare autoimmune disease.

"When my mom was diagnosed, I didn't know much about the condition. But Dana Delany, who is an actress and now a friend of mine, put me in touch with Bob Saget. Bob had made a television movie about scleroderma years ago because his sister had died from it. At the time, they did not know what scleroderma was. Bob had a group called the Scleroderma Research Foundation, so I donated to that and my mother even went to the doctor Bob had suggested, who happened to be over at Johns Hopkins."

Hall announced in November 2010 that she would be writing for Ability.

In 2010, when she was 40, Hall unsuccessfully tried to become a Catholic nun after a bad break-up, having previously wanted to become one at the age of 14. In the former case, she was refused for being too old, as the cut-off age was 39 for that order.

In 2014, she signed as an ambassador for Elizabeth Taylor's White Diamonds.

== Filmography ==
Key
| † | Denotes films that have not yet been released |

=== Film ===
| Year | Title | Role | Notes |
|---|---|---|---|
| 1999 | The Best Man | Candace "Candy" Sparks | |
| 2000 | Love & Basketball | Lena Wright | |
| 2000 | Scary Movie | Brenda Meeks | |
| 2001 | Scary Movie 2 | Brenda Meeks | |
| 2002 | The Other Brother | Vicki | |
| 2002 | Paid in Full | Keisha | |
| 2003 | Malibu's Most Wanted | Shondra | |
| 2003 | Scary Movie 3 | Brenda Meeks | |
| 2005 | King's Ransom | Peaches Clarke | |
| 2005 | The Honeymooners | Trixie Norton | |
| 2005 | Six Months Later | Keri | Short |
| 2006 | Scary Movie 4 | Brenda Meeks | |
| 2006 | Danika | Evelyn | |
| 2006 | The Elder Son | Susan | |
| 2008 | First Sunday | Omunique | |
| 2008 | Superhero Movie | Mrs. Xavier | |
| 2009 | Law Abiding Citizen | Kelly Rice | |
| 2010 | Death at a Funeral | Michelle Barnes | |
| 2011 | Mardi Gras: Spring Break | Ann Marie | |
| 2012 | Think Like a Man | Candace Hall | |
| 2013 | The Best Man Holiday | Candace "Candy" Sparks | |
| 2014 | About Last Night | Joan Derrickson | |
| 2014 | Think Like a Man Too | Candace Hall | |
| 2015 | People Places Things | Diane | |
| 2015 | Vacation | Nancy Peterson | |
| 2016 | Barbershop: The Next Cut | Angie | |
| 2016 | When the Bough Breaks | Laura Taylor | |
| 2017 | Girls Trip | Ryan Pierce | |
| 2017 | Naked | Megan Swope | |
| 2018 | Support the Girls | Lisa Conroy | |
| 2018 | Tijuana Jackson: Purpose Over Prison | Cheryl Wagner | |
| 2018 | The Hate U Give | Lisa Carter | |
| 2018 | Let's Dance | Woman on Bed | Short |
| 2019 | Little | Jordan Sanders | Also executive producer |
| 2019 | Shaft | Maya Babanikos | |
| 2021 | Breaking News in Yuba County | Ramirez | |
| 2022 | Master | Gail Bishop | Also executive producer |
| 2022 | Honk for Jesus. Save Your Soul. | Trinitie Childs | Also producer |
| 2022 | Me Time | Maya | |
| 2025 | O'Dessa | Neon Dion | |
| 2025 | One Battle After Another | Deandra | |
| 2025 | The SpongeBob Movie: Search for SquarePants | Barb (voice) | |
| 2026 | The Sheep Detectives | Cloud (voice) | |
| 2026 | Scary Movie | Brenda Meeks | |
| 2027 | Naughty † | TBA | Filming |
| 2027 | Lizard Music † | TBA | Filming |
| TBA | Judgment Day † | TBA | Post-production |

=== Television ===
Key
| † | Denotes television productions that have not yet been released |

| Year | Title | Role | Notes |
|---|---|---|---|
| 1994 | Loving | Roberta | Recurring cast |
| 1997 | New York Undercover | Tammy | Episode: "No Place Like Hell" |
| 2000 | NYPD Blue | Sharice Warner | Episode: "Little Abner" |
| 2000 | Disappearing Acts | Portia | TV movie |
| 2001–2002 | Ally McBeal | Corretta Lipp | Recurring cast (season 4); main cast (season 5) |
| 2010–2011 | Law & Order: Los Angeles | Deputy D.A. Evelyn Price | Recurring cast |
| 2013 | Second Generation Wayans | Regina | Recurring cast |
| 2014 | Married | Roxanne | Recurring cast (season 1) |
| 2014–2015 | Real Husbands of Hollywood | Herself | Recurring cast (season 3); guest (season 4) |
| 2015 | With This Ring | Trista | TV movie |
| 2015 | Key & Peele | Wife #1 | Episode: "Airplane Showdown" |
| 2016 | Grandfathered | Catherine Sanders | Recurring cast |
| 2016 | Uncle Buck | Jackie King | Episode: "Pilot" |
| 2016 | Crushed | Celia | TV movie |
| 2016 | Lip Sync Battle | Herself | Episode: "Lupita Nyong'o vs. Regina Hall" |
| 2016–2017 | Black-ish | Vivian | 3 episodes |
| 2017 | Insecure | Ninny | Recurring cast (season 2) |
| 2017–2018 | The Gong Show | Herself (guest judge) | 3 episodes |
| 2019 | BET Awards 2019 | Herself (host) | TV special |
| 2019–2021 | Black Monday | Dawn Darcy | Main cast; also producer |
| 2021 | Nine Perfect Strangers | Carmel Schneider | Main cast |
| 2022 | 94th Academy Awards | Herself (co-host) | TV special |
| 2022 | The Best Man: The Final Chapters | Candace "Candy" Sparks-Murchison | Main cast |
| 2026–present | The Five-Star Weekend | Dru-Ann Jones | Main cast |
| TBA | Rabbit, Rabbit † | Poppy | Main cast |

== Awards and nominations ==
| Year | Work | Award | Result | Ref. |
|---|---|---|---|---|
| 2003 | Ally McBeal | NAACP Image Award for Outstanding Supporting Actress in a Comedy Series | Nominated | |
| 2005 | Danika | Best Actress – San Diego Film Festival | Won | |
| 2018 | Girls Trip | NAACP Image Award for Outstanding Supporting Actress in a Motion Picture | Nominated | |
| 2018 | Support the Girls | African-American Film Critics Association Award for Best Actress | Won | |
| 2018 | Support the Girls | Austin Film Critics Association Award for Best Actress | Nominated | |
| 2018 | Support the Girls | Black Reel Award for Outstanding Actress | Nominated | |
| 2018 | Support the Girls | Boston Online Film Critics Association Award for Best Ensemble | Won | |
| 2018 | Support the Girls | Chicago Film Critics Association Award for Best Actress | Nominated | |
| 2018 | Support the Girls | Florida Film Critics Circle Award for Best Cast | Runner-up | |
| 2018 | Support the Girls | Gotham Independent Film Award for Best Actress | Nominated | |
| 2018 | Support the Girls | Independent Spirit Award for Best Female Lead | Nominated | |
| 2018 | Support the Girls | Online Film Critics Society Award for Best Actress | Nominated | |
| 2018 | Support the Girls | National Society of Film Critics Award for Best Actress | Runner-up | |
| 2018 | Support the Girls | New York Film Critics Circle Award for Best Actress | Won | |
| 2018 | Support the Girls | San Francisco Film Critics Circle Award for Best Actress | Nominated | |
| 2018 | Support the Girls | Seattle Film Critics Society Award for Best Actress | Nominated | |
| 2018 | Support the Girls | Vancouver Film Critics Circle Award for Best Actress | Won | |
| 2018 | Support the Girls | Talk Film Society Award for Best Actress | Nominated | |
| 2018 | Support the Girls | Toronto Film Critics Association Award for Best Actress | Nominated | |
| 2019 | The Hate U Give | Women's Image Network Awards for Best Supporting Actress, Feature Film | Won | |
| 2019 | The Hate U Give | NAACP Image Award for Outstanding Supporting Actress in a Motion Picture | Nominated | |
| 2020 | Black Monday | Black Reel Award for Outstanding Supporting Actress, Comedy Series | Nominated | |
| 2020 | Black Monday | NAACP Image Award for Outstanding Actress in a Comedy Series | Nominated | |
| 2020 | 2019 BET Awards Ceremony | NAACP Image Award for Outstanding Host in a Reality, Game Show or Variety (Series or Special) | Nominated | |
| 2021 | Nine Perfect Strangers | Newport Beach Film Festival – Spotlight Award (Artist of Distinction) | Won | |
| 2021 | Black Monday | NAACP Image Award for Outstanding Actress in a Comedy Series | Nominated | |
| 2022 | Black Monday | NAACP Image Award for Outstanding Actress in a Comedy Series | Nominated | |
| 2022 | Nine Perfect Strangers | NAACP Image Award for Outstanding Supporting Actress in a TV Movie, Limited-Series or Dramatic Special | Won | |
| 2022 | Life's Work | San Diego International Film Festival – Cinema Vanguard Award | Honored | |
| 2022 | Honk for Jesus. Save Your Soul. | Napa Valley Film Festival – Maverick Award | Honored | |
| 2023 | Honk for Jesus. Save Your Soul. | Independent Spirit Award for Best Lead Performance | Nominated | |
| 2023 | Honk for Jesus. Save Your Soul. | San Diego Film Critics Society Award for Best Actress | Nominated | |
| 2023 | Honk for Jesus. Save Your Soul. | Black Reel Award for Outstanding Actress | Nominated | |
| 2023 | Honk for Jesus. Save Your Soul. | NAACP Image Award for Outstanding Actress in a Motion Picture | Nominated | |
| 2023 | The Best Man: The Final Chapters | NAACP Image Award for Outstanding Actress in a TV Movie, Limited-Series or Dramatic Special | Nominated | |
| 2025 | One Battle After Another | SCAD Savannah Film Festival – Gold Derby Spotlight Award | Honored | |
| 2025 | One Battle After Another | Critics Choice Awards Celebration of Cinema & Television – Best Ensemble | Honored | |
| 2025 | One Battle After Another | New York Film Critics Online | Nominated | |
| 2025 | One Battle After Another | Georgia Film Critics – Best Supporting Actress | Runner-up | |
| 2025 | One Battle After Another | Women Film Critics Circle – Best Supporting Actress | Won | |
| 2026 | One Battle After Another | Actor Awards - Outstanding Performance by a Cast in a Motion Picture | Nominated | |
| 2026 | One Battle After Another | Astra Film Awards – Best Supporting Actress | Nominated | |
| 2026 | One Battle After Another | AARP Movies for Grownups Awards – Best Supporting Actress | Won | |
| 2026 | One Battle After Another | Black Reel Awards – Outstanding Supporting Performance | Nominated | |
| 2026 | Scary Movie | Fangoria Chainsaw Award – Best Supporting Performance | Nominated | |
