= Malcolm D. Lee =

American director (born 1970)

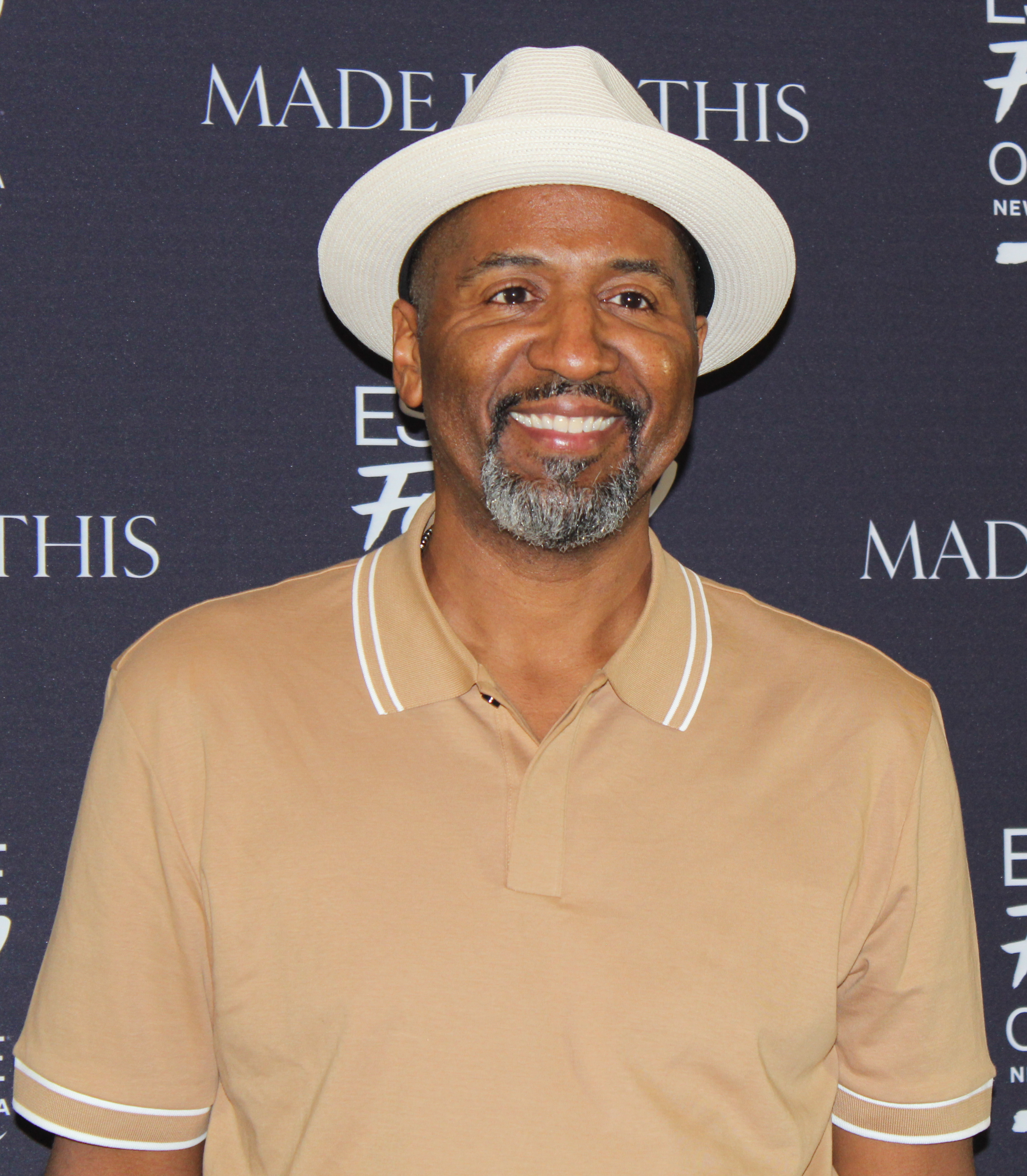
- Lee at EssenceFest 2025
- Born: January 11, 1970 (age 56); New York City, New York, U.S.
- Education: Packer Collegiate Institute; Georgetown University
- Occupations: Director; producer; writer
- Spouse: Camille Melika Banks (m. 2000)
- Relatives: Spike Lee (cousin); David Lee (cousin); Joie Lee (cousin); Cinqué Lee (cousin)

Malcolm D. Lee (born January 11, 1970) is an American filmmaker. He is known for directing comedy films including The Best Man (1999), Undercover Brother (2002), Roll Bounce (2005), Welcome Home Roscoe Jenkins (2008), Soul Men (2008), Scary Movie 5 (2013), The Best Man Holiday (2013), Girls Trip (2017), Night School (2018), and Space Jam: A New Legacy (2021), and the Peacock comedy-drama miniseries The Best Man: The Final Chapters (2022).

== Early life ==
Malcolm D. Lee was born on January 11, 1970, in Queens, New York City. He is a graduate of Packer Collegiate Institute and Georgetown University.

He is the cousin of filmmakers Spike Lee, Joie Lee and Cinqué Lee, and still photographer David Lee.

== Career ==
Lee has directed Undercover Brother, The Best Man, Roll Bounce, Welcome Home Roscoe Jenkins, Soul Men, Girls Trip, and other films. He also directed an episode of the sitcom Everybody Hates Chris. He directed an installment in the Scary Movie franchise, Scary Movie 5. In 2013, he directed The Best Man Holiday, a sequel to The Best Man.

In 2017 Girls Trip, starring Regina Hall, Queen Latifah, Tiffany Haddish and Jada Pinkett Smith, received positive reviews from critics and grossed $137 million worldwide, with $100 million of that total being from the domestic market, the first comedy of 2017 to do so. The success led to a first look deal with Universal Pictures.

In 2021, Lee directed a sequel to Space Jam titled Space Jam: A New Legacy, starring LeBron James and Don Cheadle. The film was a critical and commercial failure which released during the COVID-19 pandemic.

Lee has expressed interest in making a third Space Jam film with Dwayne Johnson as the lead and focusing on wrestling instead of basketball.

In 2026, Lee directed the psychological thriller Strung, starring Chloe Bailey. The film was selected to open the 30th edition of the American Black Film Festival in Miami Beach.

== Filmography ==
Film

Year	Title	Director	Producer	Writer	Notes
1999	The Best Man	Yes	No	Yes	Role: Emcee
2002	Undercover Brother	Yes	No	No	
2005	Roll Bounce	Yes	No	No	
2008	Welcome Home Roscoe Jenkins	Yes	Executive	Yes	
2008	Soul Men	Yes	No	No	
2013	Scary Movie 5	Yes	No	No	
2013	The Best Man Holiday	Yes	Yes	Yes	
2016	Barbershop: The Next Cut	Yes	Executive	No	
2017	Girls Trip	Yes	Yes	No	
2018	Night School	Yes	Executive	No	
2021	Space Jam: A New Legacy	Yes	No	No	Also executive soundtrack producer
2026	Strung	Yes	Yes	No	

Television

Year	Title	Director	Executive Producer	Notes
2006	Everybody Hates Chris	Yes	No	Episode "Everybody Hates The Lottery"
2017	Shots Fired	Yes	No	Episode "Hour Four: Truth"
2019	Wu-Tang: An American Saga	Yes	No	Episode "Box in Hand"
2021	Harlem	Yes	Yes	Episodes "Pilot" and "Saturn Returns"
2022	The Best Man: The Final Chapters	Yes	Yes	Also writer and creator

Other credits

Year	Title	Role
1992	Malcolm X	Set production and post-production assistant
1995	Clockers	Assistant to Spike Lee
1996	Girl 6	Director trainee
