= Harold Perrineau =

American actor (born 1963)

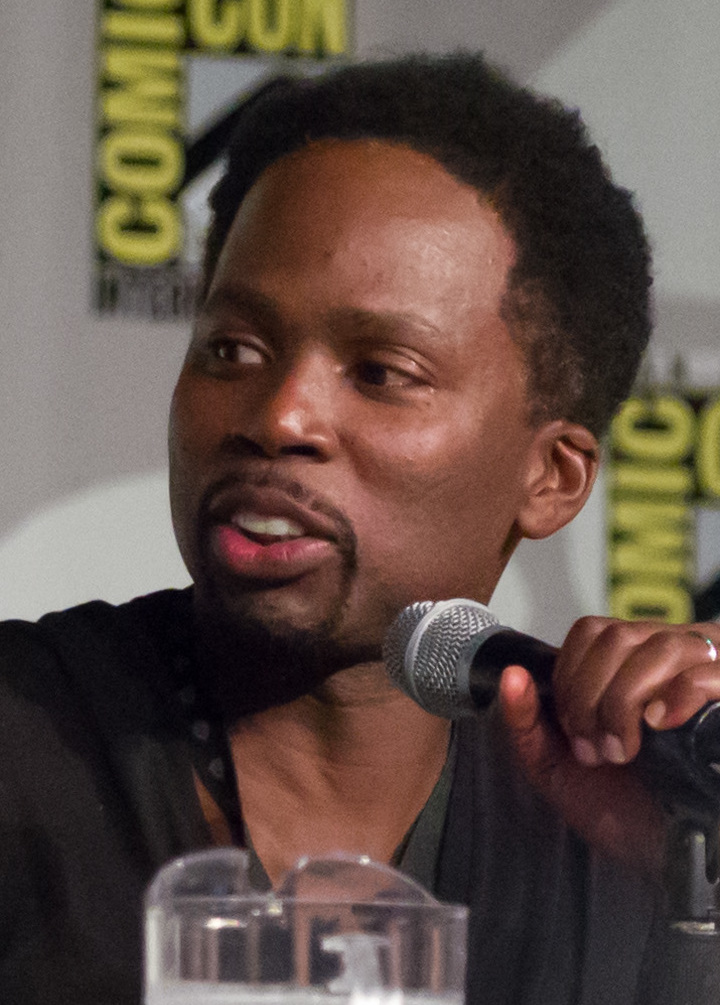
- Perrineau at the 2014 San Diego Comic Con
- Born: August 7, 1963 (age 63); New York City, U.S.
- Other names: Harold Perrineau Jr. Harold Williams
- Education: Shenandoah University
- Occupation: Actor
- Years active: 1986–present
- Spouse: Brittany Robinson (m. 2002)
- Children: 3, including Aurora

Harold Perrineau (born August 7, 1963) is an American actor. His breakout role was in the independent film Smoke (1995), for which he was nominated for the Independent Spirit Award for Best Supporting Male. He went on to appear as Mercutio in Romeo+Juliet (1996) and Link in The Matrix Reloaded and The Matrix Revolutions (both 2003).

On television, he has starred as Augustus Hill in the HBO prison drama Oz (1997–2003), Michael Dawson in the ABC series Lost (2004–2010), and Sheriff Boyd Stevens in the MGM+ horror series From (2022–present).

Perrineau has also appeared in the films The Edge (1997), The Best Man (1999), Woman on Top (2000), and 28 Weeks Later (2007). His other television credits include Sons of Anarchy (2012), Constantine (2014–2015), Claws (2017–2022), and The Rookie (2019–2021).

== Early life ==
Perrineau was born in Brooklyn, New York City. His parents changed his name to Williams when he was a child, but he later changed it back, after discovering there was already a Harold Williams in the Screen Actors Guild. He attended Shenandoah University and Alvin Ailey American Dance Theater.

== Career ==
In 1989, Perrineau was cast as the original Tyrone Jackson in the world premiere of the stage adaptation of the 1980 hit movie Fame (now known as Fame: The Musical) at the Walnut Street Theatre, in Philadelphia, Pennsylvania. He took the role of Link in The Matrix series after the original operator Tank was written out of the script when Marcus Chong was fired over monetary disputes. Around this time, he also booked a main role of Augustus Hill on the HBO series Oz (1997–2003).

Perrineau played Michael Dawson on ABC's hit show Lost. He was temporarily written off when his character left the island with his son at the end of season two and did not appear in season three. In July 2007, it was announced he would return to the main cast for the show's fourth season. However, the return was short-lived, as the fourth season was his last as a regular cast member. He made one guest appearance in the sixth and final season.

Since his debut single "Stay Strong" in 2007 Perrineau has been working on his musical career. He actively collaborated with music producer Tomo in der Muhlen, known as DJ Tomo Tom Tom, on his debut album, Seeker. The first single, "Moving On", was released October 15, 2011. Perrineau has also done live shows where he performs with a full band: two guitars, bass, drums and keyboards. He performed at Los Angeles club The Mint in April 2010. Perrineau has appeared in MKTO's "Thank You" music video and J. Cole's "She Knows" music video.

Perrineau starred in 30 Days of Night: Dark Days with Rhys Coiro, Mia Kirshner, Kiele Sanchez, Diora Baird and Monique Ganderton. Perrineau appeared in the 2008 music video "Yes We Can".

Perrineau voiced the title character from Marvel's Blade anime series on G4 in January 2012. He was cast to play the character of Damon Pope, the main antagonist of season 5 of the hit show Sons of Anarchy.

Perrineau starred as Stevie, the bass player, in the TBS comedy Wedding Band, which ran from 2012 to 2013.

Perrineau starred as Manny, an angelic messenger, in Constantine, the short-lived 2015 television series based on the DC Comics/Vertigo character John Constantine.

He made his Broadway debut in the Roundabout Theatre Company production of Anton Chekov's The Cherry Orchard, adapted by Stephen Karam. The play ran from September 2016 to December 4, 2016. Perrineau played Lopakhin, with Diane Lane as Ranevskaya. Also in 2016, Perrineau co-starred in the Amazon Studios legal series Goliath.

From 2017 to 2022, Perrineau played Dean, a man on the autism spectrum and the brother of Desna, in TNT's Claws. He won the award for Outstanding Supporting Actor in a Drama Series at the NAACP Awards.

In May 2021, Deadline announced that Perrineau would lead the cast of the forthcoming MGM+ science fiction horror television series From. The first season of the series was released globally in 2022. The second season of From premiered on April 23, 2023. The third season of From premiered on September 22, 2024. The fourth season of From was released on April 19th 2026. Perrineau has received critical acclaim for his performance on From.

In November 2022, Perrineau signed with Independent Artist Group for representation.

In December 2024, Perrineau was announced as a cast member of the independent drama Out Come The Wolves based on the Rancid 1995 album of the same name.

== Personal life ==
Since 2002, Perrineau has been married to Brittany Robinson Perrineau, a former actress and model for Tommy Hilfiger and Liz Claiborne throughout the 1990s. Brittany appeared on the first season of Lost in an episode titled "Outlaws" as the girlfriend of Sawyer, and in the episode "Numbers" as the woman who read the lottery numbers. Her acting credits also include the romantic-comedy Saving Face (2004) and the surreal biopic Your Name Here (2008).

They have three daughters: actress Aurora, born 1994, and two others born in 2008 and 2013.

== Filmography ==
=== Film ===
| Year | Title | Role | Notes |
|---|---|---|---|
| 1988 | Shakedown | Tommie | |
| 1990 | King of New York | Thug Leader | |
| 1991 | Out for Justice | King's Henchman (uncredited) | |
| 1995 | Smoke | Thomas "Rashid" Cole | |
| 1995 | Flirt | Men's Room Man 1# | |
| 1996 | Blood and Wine | Henry | |
| 1996 | Romeo + Juliet | Mercutio | |
| 1997 | The Edge | Steve | |
| 1998 | Lulu on the Bridge | Bobby Perez | |
| 1998 | Come to | Joseph | Short |
| 1999 | A Day in Black and White | Black Man | |
| 1999 | Macbeth in Manhattan | Chorus | |
| 1999 | The Best Man | Julian Murch | |
| 2000 | Woman on Top | Monica Jones | |
| 2000 | Overnight Sensation | Experienced PA | |
| 2001 | Prison Song | Uncle Cee | |
| 2002 | On Line | Moe Curley | |
| 2003 | The Matrix Reloaded | Link | |
| 2003 | The Matrix Revolutions | Link | |
| 2007 | 28 Weeks Later | Flynn | |
| 2007 | Garfield Gets Real | Husband | Voice, video |
| 2008 | Gardens of the Night | Orlando | |
| 2008 | Ball Don't Lie | Jimmy | |
| 2008 | Your Name Here | Richard Roundtree | |
| 2008 | Felon | Lieutenant Bill Jackson | |
| 2010 | The Killing Jar | John Smith | |
| 2010 | Case 219 | Franklyn Bonner | |
| 2010 | 30 Days of Night: Dark Days | Todd | Video |
| 2011 | Seeking Justice | Jimmy | |
| 2012 | Transit | Losada | |
| 2012 | Sunset Stories | Harold | |
| 2012 | Taking the Edge Off | – | Short |
| 2012 | Zero Dark Thirty | Jack | |
| 2013 | Snitch | Assistant District Attorney Jeffrey Steele | |
| 2013 | Go for Sisters | Wiley | |
| 2013 | Sexy Evil Genius | Marvin Coolidge | Video |
| 2013 | The Best Man Holiday | Julian Murch | |
| 2013 | The Championship Rounds | Darryl | Short |
| 2014 | Sabotage | Investigator Darius Jackson | |
| 2015 | Meet Me at a Funeral | Jeffrey | Short |
| 2016 | #FoundingFathers | – | Short |
| 2017 | Stephanie | Leader | |
| 2017 | The Bachelors | Dr. Rollens | |
| 2017 | I'm Not Here | Santana | |
| 2018 | Virginia Minnesota | Mister | Voice |
| 2018 | Cold Brook | Gil Le Deux | |
| 2018 | Dumplin' | Lee Wayne / Rhea Ranged | |
| 2022 | Without Ward | Lord Voraz Esquire | |
| 2023 | Unicorn Boy | Guard Pantius | Voice |
| 2024 | The Distinguished | Reverend | Short |
| 2026 | And Out Comes The Wolf | TBA | |

=== Television ===
| Year | Title | Role | Notes |
|---|---|---|---|
| 1986–1987 | Fame | Fame Dancer | Recurring role (season 6) |
| 1989 | The Cosby Show | Scott | Episode: "The Dead End Kids Meet Dr. Lotus" |
| 1990 | CBS Schoolbreak Special | Curtis | Episode: "Flour Babies" |
| 1990 | Law & Order | Jordan Hill | Episode: "Out of the Half-Light" |
| 1991 | The Days and Nights of Molly Dodd | Singer | Episode: "Here's a Neat Way to Tie Up the Loose Ends" |
| 1991–1993 | I'll Fly Away | Robert Evans | Recurring role |
| 1993 | Law & Order | Kenny Rinker | Episode: "Virus" |
| 1994 | The Cosby Mysteries | Junior Vansen | Episode: "Camouflage" |
| 1995 | New York News | Benny | 2 episodes |
| 1997 | ER | Isaac Price | Episode: "Freak Show" |
| 1997 | Living Single | Walter Jackson | Episode: "Forgive Us Our Trespasses" |
| 1997–2003 | Oz | Augustus Hill | Main role |
| 1998 | The Tempest | Ariel | TV movie |
| 1999 | Saturday Night Live | Augustus Hill | Episode: "Jerry Seinfeld/David Bowie" |
| 2003 | Spider-Man: The New Animated Series | Louis Wyler/Turbo Jet | Voice, episode: "Heroes and Villains" |
| 2003 | Dead Like Me | Aroun Levert | Episode: "Rest in Peace" |
| 2004–2010 | Lost | Michael Dawson | Main role (seasons 1–2 & 4; guest: season 6) |
| 2007 | CSI: Crime Scene Investigation | Reverend Rhodes | Episode: "Go to Hell" |
| 2007 | Demons | Mitch | TV movie |
| 2009 | The Unusuals | Detective Leo Banks | Main role |
| 2010 | CSI: NY | Reggie Tifford | Episode: "Redemption" |
| 2010 | The Whole Truth | Paul Braun | Episode: "Uncanny" |
| 2012 | Marvel Anime: Blade | Blade | Voice, main role |
| 2012 | Phineas and Ferb | Additional Voices | Episode: "Where's Perry?" |
| 2012 | Georgia | Michael | Main role |
| 2012 | Sons of Anarchy | Damon Pope | Recurring role (season 5) |
| 2012–2013 | Wedding Band | Stevie | Main role |
| 2013 | Law & Order: Special Victims Unit | Brian Tremore | Episode: "Secrets Exhumed" |
| 2014 | HitRecord on TV | Himself | Episode: "The Edge of Space" |
| 2014 | Growing Up Fisher | Fred | Episode: "Pilot" |
| 2014 | Z Nation | Lieutenant Hammond | Episode: "Puppies And Kittens" |
| 2014 | Newsreaders | Harold Perrineau | Episode: "F- Dancing, Are You Decent?" |
| 2014–2015 | Constantine | Manny | Main role |
| 2016 | The Mysteries of Laura | Charles Baptiste | Episode: "The Mystery of the Morning Jog" |
| 2016 | Goliath | Judge Reston Keller | Recurring role (season 1) |
| 2016 | Full Circle | Damon Houserman | Main role (season 3) |
| 2016 | Poor Richard's Almanack | Matt | TV movie |
| 2017 | Criminal Minds | Calvin Shaw | Recurring role (season 12) |
| 2017–2022 | Claws | Dean Simms | Main role |
| 2018–2019 | Star | Bobby Brooks | Recurring role (season 3) |
| 2019–2021 | The Rookie | Nick Armstrong | Recurring role (seasons 2–3) |
| 2020 | The Good Doctor | Wes Keeler | Episode: "Fixation" |
| 2022–present | From | Boyd Stevens | Main role |
| 2022 | The Best Man: The Final Chapters | Julian "Murch" Murchison | Main role |

=== Video games ===
| Year | Title | Role | Notes |
|---|---|---|---|
| 2003 | Enter the Matrix | Link | Voice |
| 2004 | The Matrix Online | Link | Voice |

== Awards and nominations ==
| Year | Awards | Category | Work | Outcome |
|---|---|---|---|---|
| 1996 | Independent Spirit Awards | Independent Spirit Award for Best Supporting Male | Smoke | Nominated |
| 2000 | NAACP Image Awards | NAACP Image Award for Outstanding Supporting Actor in a Motion Picture | The Best Man | Nominated |
| 2006 | Screen Actors Guild Awards | Screen Actors Guild Award for Outstanding Performance by an Ensemble in a Drama Series | Lost | Won |
| 2020 | NAACP Image Awards | NAACP Image Award for Outstanding Supporting Actor in a Drama Series | Claws | Won |
| 2022 | Saturn Awards | Saturn Award for Best Actor in a Network or Cable Television Series | From | Nominated |
