= Temple Hill Entertainment =

American film and television production company

- Industry: Film, television
- Founded: February 2006; 20 years ago
- Founder: Wyck Godfrey; Marty Bowen
- Headquarters: Los Angeles, California, United States
- Website: https://www.templehillent.com/

Temple Hill Entertainment or Temple Hill Productions is an American film and television production company, established in 2006 by producers Wyck Godfrey and Marty Bowen. The studio produced the Twilight and Maze Runner film series. In 2020, the studio signed a TV deal with Lionsgate. Temple Hill has enjoyed a first look movie deal with Paramount since 2019.In 2026, this deal was extended to television with Paramount Television Studios.

== Films ==
Release date	Title	Director(s)	Distributor
December 1, 2006	The Nativity Story	Catherine Hardwicke	New Line Cinema
November 21, 2008	Twilight	Catherine Hardwicke	Summit Entertainment
May 15, 2009	Management	Stephen Belber	Samuel Goldwyn Films
November 20, 2009	The Twilight Saga: New Moon	Chris Weitz	Summit Entertainment
February 5, 2010	Dear John	Lasse Hallström	Sony Pictures Releasing
June 30, 2010	The Twilight Saga: Eclipse	David Slade	Summit Entertainment
May 13, 2011	Everything Must Go	Dan Rush	Lionsgate
November 18, 2011	The Twilight Saga: Breaking Dawn – Part 1	Bill Condon	Summit Entertainment
September 14, 2012	10 Years	Jamie Linden	Anchor Bay Entertainment
November 16, 2012	The Twilight Saga: Breaking Dawn – Part 2	Bill Condon	Summit Entertainment
February 14, 2013	Safe Haven	Lasse Hallström	Relativity Media
June 6, 2014	The Fault in Our Stars	Josh Boone	20th Century Fox
September 19, 2014	The Maze Runner	Wes Ball	20th Century Fox
March 20, 2015	Tracers	Daniel Benmayor	Saban Films
April 10, 2015	The Longest Ride	George Tillman Jr.	20th Century Fox
July 24, 2015	Paper Towns	Jake Schreier	20th Century Fox
September 18, 2015	Maze Runner: The Scorch Trials	Wes Ball	20th Century Fox
March 24, 2017	Power Rangers	Dean Israelite	Lionsgate
January 26, 2018	Maze Runner: The Death Cure	Wes Ball	20th Century Fox
March 16, 2018	Love, Simon	Greg Berlanti	20th Century Fox
June 29, 2018	Uncle Drew	Charles Stone III	Lionsgate
August 17, 2018	Down a Dark Hall	Rodrigo Cortés	Lionsgate
September 21, 2018	Life Itself	Dan Fogelman	Amazon Studios
October 5, 2018	The Hate U Give	George Tillman Jr.	20th Century Fox
October 12, 2018	First Man	Damien Chazelle	Universal Pictures
October 25, 2019	The Kill Team	Dan Krauss	A24
August 28, 2020	All Together Now	Brett Haley	Netflix
November 25, 2020	Happiest Season	Clea DuVall	Hulu
June 18, 2021	Fatherhood	Paul Weitz	Netflix
May 20, 2022	Emergency	Carey Williams	Amazon Studios
September 23, 2022	On the Come Up	Sanaa Lathan	Paramount+
September 30, 2022	Smile	Parker Finn	Paramount Pictures
February 10, 2023	Somebody I Used to Know	Dave Franco	Amazon Studios
February 24, 2023	We Have a Ghost	Christopher Landon	Netflix
May 2, 2024	Turtles All the Way Down	Hannah Marks	Max
August 23, 2024	The Supremes at Earl's All-You-Can-Eat	Tina Mabry	Searchlight Pictures
September 20, 2024	Bagman	Colm McCarthy	Lionsgate
October 18, 2024	Smile 2	Parker Finn	Paramount Pictures
May 9, 2025	Clown in a Cornfield	Eli Craig	RLJE Films; Shudder
August 1, 2025	My Oxford Year	Iain Morris	Netflix
August 20, 2025	The Map That Leads to You	Lasse Hallström	Amazon MGM Studios
January 9, 2026	People We Meet on Vacation	Brett Haley	Netflix
September 25, 2026	Charlie Harper	Tom Dean & Mac Eldridge	Row K
September 25, 2026	Heart of the Beast	David Ayer	Paramount Pictures

=== Upcoming films ===
Release date	Title	Director(s)	Distributor
January 15, 2027	Children of Blood and Bone	Gina Prince-Bythewood	Paramount Pictures
April 16, 2027	Monitor	Matt Black & Ryan Polly	Searchlight Pictures
November 12, 2027	Tomorrow, and Tomorrow, and Tomorrow	Siân Heder	Paramount Pictures
May 12, 2028	One Italian Summer	Harry Bradbeer	Paramount Pictures

=== Undated Films ===
Title	Director(s)	Distributor
Crush	Julius Avery	20th Century Studios
Delulu	Leah McKendrick	TBA
Follow Mode	Ben Leonberg	TBA
Jealous People Are Ugly People	Theo James Krekis	New Line Cinema
Rule of Three	James Roday Rodriguez	TBA
Seekers of Infinite Love	Victoria Strouse	TBA
Smile 3	David Bruckner	Paramount Pictures

== Television ==
Year	Series	Creator(s)	Network
2011–15	Revenge	Mike Kelley	ABC
2015–17	Rosewood	Todd Harthan	Fox
2017–19	Mr. Mercedes	David E. Kelley	Audience
2019	Looking for Alaska	Josh Schwartz	Hulu
2020	The Outsider	Richard Price	HBO
2020–23	Dave	Lil Dicky; Jeff Schaffer	FXX
2020–22	Love, Victor	Isaac Aptaker; Elizabeth Berger	Hulu; Disney+ Season 3
2023	Grease: Rise of the Pink Ladies	Annabel Oakes	Paramount+
2023	The Other Black Girl	Zakiya Dalila Harris; Rashida Jones	Hulu
2026–present	Off Campus	Louisa Levy	Prime Video
2027	Boys of Tommen	Poppy Cogan	Prime Video
