= Monitor (film) =

- Teaser poster
- Directed by: Matt Black; Ryan Polly
- Written by: Matt Black; Ryan Polly
- Produced by: Marty Bowen; Wyck Godfrey; Isaac Klausner; John Fischer; Adrián Guerra
- Starring: Brittany O'Grady; Taz Skylar; Viveik Kalra
- Cinematography: Philip Lozano
- Edited by: Guillermo de la Cal
- Music by: Federico Jusid
- Production companies: Temple Hill Entertainment; Nostromo Pictures
- Distributed by: Searchlight Pictures
- Release dates: March 12, 2026 (SXSW); April 16, 2027 (United States)
- Running time: 88 minutes
- Country: United States
- Language: English

Monitor is a 2026 American horror film written and directed by Matt Black and Ryan Polly. It stars Brittany O'Grady, Taz Skylar, and Viveik Kalra.

Monitor premiered at the 2026 South by Southwest Film & TV Festival on March 12, 2026, and it will be released in the United States on April 16, 2027, by Searchlight Pictures.

== Plot ==
When a group of social media moderators encounters a highly disturbing video, they must survive a diabolical entity that begins hunting them down one by one with a single purpose: to escape the screen.

== Cast ==
- Brittany O'Grady as Maggie
- Taz Skylar as Isaac
- Viveik Kalra as Sariq
- Ines Høysæter Asserson as Faye
- Gunner Willis as Gunner
- Sara Alexander as Claudia
- Camila Bejarano Wahlgren as Hazel
- John De Luca as Police Officer
- Adam Underhill as Cliff

== Production ==
In November 2024, it was reported that Matt Black and Ryan Polly would be writing and directing a horror film titled Monitor. Principal photography began on March 10, 2025, in Barcelona and the Canary Islands, when Brittany O'Grady, Taz Skylar, Viveik Kalra, Ines Høysæter Asserson, Gunner Willis, Sara Alexander, and Camila Bejarano Wahlgren round out the cast.

== Release ==
Monitor premiered at the Midnighter section of the 2026 South by Southwest Film & TV Festival on March 12, 2026. In April 2026, Searchlight Pictures acquired U.S., U.K. and Southeast Asian distribution rights to the film, planning to release it sometime in 2027. In June 2026, on the Act Two Podcast, Black and Polly revealed that the film would be theatrically released in the United States on April 30, 2027. In August 2026, the film's release date was moved up two weeks to April 16, 2027.

== Reception ==
Matt Donato of Daily Dead gave the film a positive review and a 3.5 out of 5 rating and wrote: Monitor isn't found footage, but it has a Butterfly Kisses quality to its approach (complimentary) [...] a techno-horror terror that thoughtfully questions the ethics of content vetting corporations.

Brian Tallerico of RogerEbert.com gave the film a negative feedback and wrote: It wades into the increasingly crowded genre of how the internet is going to kill us, but with too little thematic exploration or impressive craft.
