= Alan Di Fiore =

Canadian screenwriter and producer

Alan Di Fiore (sometimes Alan DiFiore) is a Canadian screenwriter and producer of film and television, best known for his work on Grimm and the thriller film Money Monster, starring George Clooney, Julia Roberts and Jack O'Connell.

== Early life ==
DiFiore co-founded Pagliacci's Restaurant, located in Victoria, British Columbia, Canada, with his friend, Howard Siegel. His mother was the creator of most of Pagliacci's Restaurant's outstanding menu items.

== Career ==
DiFiore has worked extensively across film and television since the early 1990s. His numerous television credits include the CTV movie The Life and Milgaard, which won eight Geminis; the mini-series Vendetta and episodes of Ghost Whisperer and Neon Rider. In 2005, he won his third Gemini Award for his work on the Da Vinci's Inquest television show. DiFiore also wrote and served as producer on the CBS series The Handler.

In 2010, Di Fiore created The Bridge. The series was inspired by former Toronto police union head, Craig Bromell. It's a procedural drama about a union leader fighting criminals on the street, his bosses, and corruption on the force. Di Foire executive produced it alongside Laszlo Barna, Bromell, Robert Wertheimer and Adam J. Shully. He also worked on the fantasy police procedural drama television series Grimm (co-created by Jim Kouf, whom Di Fiore has worked with on several projects) as a writer and producer.

In 2016, Money Monster was released, directed by Jodie Foster. Di Fiore and Kouf wrote the original script of the film. On July 25, 2014, TriStar Pictures won the rights to finance and release the film, whose latest draft was written by Jamie Linden.

== Filmography ==
Production	Notes	Distributor/Broadcaster
Bride of Violence	Mini-series	
Neon Rider	2 episodes	CTV (1990-1992)/YTV (1992-1995)
Hard Time: The David Milgaard Story	TV movie	Alliance Atlantis Communications
On The Corner	Story Editor	On the Corner Productions Inc.
The Life	TV movie	CTV
The Handler	Writer	CBS
Da Vinci's Inquest	Story Editor, writer - 6 episodes	CBC Television
Desolation Sound	Story Editor	Allumination Filmworks
Ghost Whisperer	1 episode	CBS
The Quality of Life	TV movie	CBC
The Bridge	Creator	CTV
A Fork in The Road	Written with Jim Kouf	
Grimm	Writer- 10 episodes, co-executive producer	NBC
Money Monster	Written with Jim Kouf and Jamie Linden	TriStar Pictures
The Long Road Home	Mini-series, 2 episodes	National Geographic
The Expanse	1 episode	Syfy
