= On the Come Up (film) =

2022 film directed by Sanaa Lathan

- Official release poster
- Directed by: Sanaa Lathan
- Written by: Kay Oyegun
- Based on: On the Come Up by Angie Thomas
- Produced by: Timothy M. Bourne; Marty Bowen; Wyck Godfrey; Isaac Klausner; Jay Marcus; Robert Teitel; Angie Thomas; George Tillman Jr.
- Starring: Jamila C. Gray; Da'Vine Joy Randolph; Mike Epps; Lil Yachty; Sanaa Lathan; Method Man; Vin Hill
- Cinematography: Eric Branco
- Edited by: Steven Rosenblum
- Music by: Daniel Wohl
- Production companies: Paramount Players; Temple Hill Entertainment; State Street Pictures
- Distributed by: Paramount+
- Release dates: September 8, 2022 (TIFF); September 23, 2022 (United States)
- Running time: 116 minutes
- Country: United States
- Language: English
- Budget: $20 million
- Box office: $236,153

On the Come Up is a 2022 American musical drama film directed by Sanaa Lathan in her feature directorial debut. Based on the 2019 novel of the same name by Angie Thomas, it stars Jamila C. Gray, Da'Vine Joy Randolph, Mike Epps, Lil Yachty, Lathan, and Method Man.

On the Come Up is produced by Paramount Players, Temple Hill Entertainment and State Street Pictures. The film had its world premiere at the Toronto International Film Festival on September 8, 2022, and was released both in limited theaters and on Paramount+ on September 23, 2022. It received positive reviews from critics.

== Plot ==
Brianna "Bri" Jackson is a 16-year-old that has decided to take on the legacy of her late father, Lawless Jackson, who was a local rapper from the Garden Heights neighborhood. Bri is encouraged to pursue her dreams of rapping by her Aunt Pooh who manages her. She navigates the life of who she wants to be, who she is and who everyone sees her as. This is a struggle for her, especially at her current school.

After Bri runs from the "Ring" (a place where all the local MCs go to battle), she heads home and realizes that she needs to stop being scared and go for what she wants and what she deserves. Her mother Jay is struggling to manage her life after losing her job. They both start to figure out ways to come up with the money to pay bills. This is on top of trying to rebuild the family's relationship after Jay left Bri and her older brother Trey with their grandparents while she was in active addiction. Clean for three years now, Jay tries continually to reassure Bri that everything will be okay.

At school, Bri goes to sell candy to help out at home. While saying bye to her best friends Sonny and Malik, she starts heading to class. A male security officer becomes aggressive with her, demanding that she give him her bag full of candy. She is then thrown to the ground, handcuffed and taken to the principal's office. Jay is called to the school to pick up Bri and expresses her concerns on how Bri is cared for and protected at the school. Even after the principal mentions this is not the first time she has been in trouble. Bri's behavior results in her getting suspended; it is not anything compared to what is mentioned so Jay and Bri leave the school and head home.

Bri is convinced to try the battle at the Ring again by her Aunt Pooh and her friends, where she beats Milez, an up-and-coming artist who is the son of Supreme (a major producer, who worked with Bri's father before he died). In the midst of celebrating the win, Aunt Pooh gets into a disagreement with the Kings Crown. This disagreement resulted in everyone rushing home. Bri and Aunt Pooh, excited about the battle go home after getting a few groceries. Jay meets them at the door and is upset about them getting home late. Bri gives her mom her battle winnings and tells her Aunt Pooh and her are doing good.

Since the win against Milez, Bri and Aunt Pooh decide to go back up to the Ring and battle again. However, the bouncer disregards their entry because of the beef that happened between Aunt Pooh and some of the gang King's Crown. Therefore, Bri goes to start an outside battle instead with another MC named Ms. Tique and wins. This gets the attention of Supreme.

Bri agrees to go to Atlanta along with Sonny and Malik to work with Supreme on a new hit. After creating the hit, Malik and her get in an argument about her portraying someone she is not in the song. This makes them no longer talk to each other. Bri's song creates issues with the parents of the kids at her school as well as with the gang King's Crown. Arriving home, Aunt Pooh gets angry with Bri because of the lyrics as well.

Jay and Bri have a heart to heart about the pass. They agree to start fresh and try to move on. They then head to her school where the superintendent is speaking on what the concerns the other parents have about her lyrics and how fast the song is getting around the community. Jay holds him accountable on never calling her back regarding Bri's suspension and how she was assaulted by the security officers at her school. Malik reconciles with Bri, then decides to walk home where they are approached by two of the Kings Crown that assault Malik and steals Lawless' chain from Bri because of what she said in the song. Aunt Pooh drives up to Bri and Malik demanding that they tell her what is wrong. She then goes to retaliates and ends up in the hospital.

At the hospital, a doctor states that once Pooh wakes up from her coma she will be taken into custody by the police. Aunt Pooh wakes up and tells Bri that she has always known she was set for greatness. That she needs to go battle Infamous Millz Supreme's artist at the ring. After Infamous talks about Bri's mother and their situation. Bri battles Infamous based on all the pain and growth she has experienced and ends up winning the battle.

== Cast ==
- Jamila C. Gray as Bri Jackson
- Da'Vine Joy Randolph as Pooh
- Mike Epps as Hype
- Lil Yachty as Infamous Millz
- Sanaa Lathan as Jayda “Jay” Jackson
- Method Man as Supreme
- Titus Makin Jr. as Trey
- Miles Gutierrez-Riley as Sonny
- Michael Cooper Jr. as Malik
- Justin Martin as Milez
- GaTa as M-Dot
- Vin Hill as King Crown

== Production ==
On February 4, 2019, Fox 2000 Pictures acquired the rights to adapt Angie Thomas's 2019 novel On the Come Up, with George Tillman Jr. set to direct. The film's producers include Thomas and Tillman, alongside Robert Teitel, Jay Marcus from State Street Pictures, and Marty Bowen, Isaac Klausner and John Fischer of Temple Hill Entertainment. On December 11, 2019, after Disney's acquisition of 21st Century Fox and closing of Fox 2000, Paramount Players acquired the film adaptation with Kay Oyegun hired to write the script and Tillman Jr. still attached to direct. On October 19, 2020, Wanuri Kahiu replaced Tillman Jr. as director of the film. On June 10, 2021, it was announced that Sanaa Lathan would make her directorial debut with the film, replacing Kahiu. On October 21, 2021, it was announced that newcomer Jamila C. Gray had been cast to play the lead role in the film. On November 8, 2021, Method Man, Mike Epps, and Da'Vine Joy Randolph were cast in the film.

== Release ==
The film premiered at the 2022 Toronto International Film Festival on September 8, 2022. It was released on September 23, 2022, both in limited theaters and on the streaming service Paramount+.

== Reception ==
The film has an approval rating of 74% based on 31 professional reviews on the review aggregator website Rotten Tomatoes, with an average rating of 6.2/10. Tomris Laffly of The A.V. Club rated the film a B−, calling it "an upbeat and vibrant coming-of-age movie." Beandrea July of The New York Times called the narrative arc "predictable" but concluded that "even with its flaws, the film, by bringing a character like Bri into the cadre of battle rap, is a welcome update to the male bravado types we're used to seeing dominate the mic."
