= Rule of Three (film) =

- Directed by: James Roday Rodriguez
- Written by: Todd Harthan; James Roday Rodriguez
- Based on: The Rule of Three by Sam Ripley
- Produced by: Wyck Godfrey; Marty Bowen; Adrian Guerra; Isaac Klausner; Núria Valls
- Starring: Chloe East; Thomasin McKenzie; Sutton Foster; Jimmi Simpson; Tom Everett Scott; Bilal Hasna
- Cinematography: Rita Noriega
- Production companies: Temple Hill Entertainment; Protagonist Pictures; Taft Tennis; Nostromo Pictures
- Country: United States
- Language: English

Rule of Three is an upcoming American horror film directed by James Roday Rodriguez and co-written by Rodriguez and Todd Harthan, based on the 2022 novel The Rule of Three by Sam Ripley. It stars Chloe East, Thomasin McKenzie, Sutton Foster, Jimmi Simpson, Tom Everett Scott, and Bilal Hasna. The film was produced by Wyck Godfrey, Marty Bowen, Adrian Guerra, Núria Valls, and Isaac Klausner.

== Premise ==
Amy and her family are plagued by a deadly curse: every three years, death strikes under mysterious circumstances, horrifically killing family members. It's almost three years to the day since Amy's parents' death, and Amy realizes the curse must strike her next. With the help of her best friend Lizzy, the two friends try to cheat Amy's death and find a way to reverse the curse.

== Cast ==
- Chloe East as Amy
- Thomasin McKenzie as Lizzy
- Sutton Foster
- Jimmi Simpson
- Tom Everett Scott
- Bilal Hasna

== Production ==
On April 29, 2025, the film, a Temple Hill Entertainment and Protagonist Pictures co-production, was announced as the first installment in a new horror trilogy adapted from Sam Ripley's novel of the same name. Thomasin McKenzie and Katie Douglas were cast in the roles of Lizzy and Amy respectively. Protagonist Pictures launched sales at the 2025 Cannes market.

In January 2026, principal photography began in Barcelona.

On February 4, 2026, it was announced that Chloe East was now cast in the role of Amy, and that Jimmi Simpson, Sutton Foster, Tom Everett Scott, and Bilal Hasna had joined the cast in undisclosed roles. Later that month, the filming location shifted to Gran Canaria in the Canary Islands.
