= Money Monster =

2016 film by Jodie Foster

- Theatrical release poster
- Directed by: Jodie Foster
- Screenplay by: Jamie Linden; Alan Di Fiore; Jim Kouf
- Story by: Alan Di Fiore; Jim Kouf
- Produced by: Daniel Dubiecki; Lara Alameddine; George Clooney; Grant Heslov
- Starring: George Clooney; Julia Roberts; Jack O'Connell; Dominic West; Caitríona Balfe; Giancarlo Esposito
- Cinematography: Matthew Libatique
- Edited by: Matt Chessé
- Music by: Dominic Lewis
- Production companies: TriStar Pictures; LStar Capital; Smokehouse Pictures; The Allegiance Theater
- Distributed by: Sony Pictures Releasing
- Release dates: May 12, 2016 (Cannes); May 13, 2016 (United States)
- Running time: 99 minutes
- Country: United States
- Language: English
- Budget: $27.4 million
- Box office: $93.3 million

Money Monster is a 2016 American crime thriller film directed by Jodie Foster, from a screenplay by Jamie Linden, Alan Di Fiore, and Jim Kouf. It stars George Clooney as financial television host Lee Gates and Julia Roberts as his producer Patty Fenn, as they are put in an extreme situation when an irate investor takes them and their crew as hostage. The cast also features Jack O'Connell, Dominic West, Caitríona Balfe, and Giancarlo Esposito.

Money Monster had its world premiere at the 69th Cannes Film Festival on May 12, 2016, and was theatrically released in the United States the next day by Sony Pictures Releasing. Despite receiving mixed reviews from critics, the film was a box office success, grossing over $93 million against a budget of $27.4 million.

== Plot ==
Flamboyant television financial expert Lee Gates is in the midst of the latest edition of his show, Money Monster. Less than 24 hours earlier, IBIS Clear Capital's stock inexplicably cratered, supposedly due to a glitch in a trading algorithm, costing investors $800 million. Lee planned to have IBIS CEO Walt Camby appear for an interview, but Camby unexpectedly departed for a business trip to Geneva, Switzerland.

Midway through the show, a deliveryman wanders onto the set, pulls a gun and takes Lee hostage, forcing him to put on a vest laden with explosives. The man reveals that his name is Kyle Budwell, who invested $60,000—his entire life savings—in IBIS after Lee endorsed the company on camera. He was wiped out along with the other investors.

Unless Kyle gets some answers, he will blow up Lee before killing himself. Once police are notified, they discover that the receiver to the bomb's vest is located over Lee's kidney. The only way to destroy the receiver—and with it, Kyle's leverage—is to shoot Lee and hope he survives.

With the help of longtime director Patty Fenn, Lee tries to calm Kyle and locate Camby, though Kyle is dissatisfied when both Lee and IBIS chief communications officer Diane Lester offer to compensate him for his financial loss. He is angered by Diane's insistence that the algorithm is to blame. Diane is not satisfied with her own explanation, either, and defies colleagues by contacting a programmer who created the algorithm, Won Joon. Reached in Seoul, Joon insists that an algorithm could not take such a large, lopsided position without someone meddling with it.

Lee appeals to his TV viewers for help, seeking to recoup the lost investment, but is dejected by their response. The NYPD find Kyle's pregnant girlfriend Molly and allow her to talk to Kyle through a video feed. When she learns that he lost everything, she viciously berates him before the police cut the feed. Lee, seeing the decimation that has been visited on Kyle (i.e., not only losing so much money, but being yelled at on live TV by his hateful, spiteful girlfriend), decides to side with Kyle. Lee agrees to help his captor discover what went wrong.

Once Camby arrives, Diane flips through his passport, discovering that instead of going to Geneva he went to Johannesburg, South Africa. With this clue, along with messages from Camby's phone, Patty and the Money Monster team contact a group of Icelandic hackers to seek the truth. After a police sniper misses a shot at Lee, he and Kyle resolve to corner Camby at Federal Hall National Memorial, where, according to Diane, Camby is headed.

They head out with network cameramen Lenny, plus the police, and a mob of fans and jeerers alike. Having earned his trust, Kyle admits to Lee that the vest does not actually contain explosives, simply clay. Kyle accidentally shoots and wounds producer Ron Sprecher when Ron throws Lee a new earpiece. Kyle and Lee finally confront Camby with video evidence obtained by the hackers.

Camby had bribed the militant leader of a South African miners' union to go on strike at a platinum mine. When the mining company's share price crashed, IBIS bought $800 million of its shares. Camby intended to take advantage of the strike ending at a pre-arranged time, selling at a much higher than the purchase price as the stock rebounded, potentially making IBIS $2.4 billion.

The gambit backfired when the union stayed on the picket line. Camby visited the union leader that day in an unsuccessful attempt to bully him into ending the strike. IBIS' stock continued to plummet under the weight of its investment in the failing stock of the mining company. Despite the evidence, Camby refuses to admit his swindle until Kyle takes the explosive vest off Lee and puts it on Camby.

Camby finally admits to his wrongdoing on live camera. Satisfied with the outcome, and knowing the detonator is harmless, Kyle instigates suicide by cop – he triggers the detonator and is instantly shot by a sniper. Lee punches Camby, as his greed and corruption cost Kyle his life.

In the aftermath, the SEC announces that IBIS will be placed under investigation, while Camby is charged with criminal violations of the Foreign Corrupt Practices Act.

Lee and Patty reconcile, wondering how they will follow their last broadcast.

== Cast ==
- George Clooney as Lee Gates
- Julia Roberts as Patty Fenn
- Jack O'Connell as Kyle Budwell
- Dominic West as Walt Camby
- Caitriona Balfe as Diane Lester
- Giancarlo Esposito as Captain Marcus Powell
- Christopher Denham as Ron Sprecher
- Lenny Venito as Lenny, The Cameraman
- Chris Bauer as Lieutenant Nelson
- Dennis Boutsikaris as Avery, Goodloe CFO
- Emily Meade as Molly
- Condola Rashad as Bree, The Assistant
- Aaron Yoo as Won Joon
- Makhaola Ndebele as Moshe Mambo
- Olivia Luccardi as Arlene
- Grizz Chapman as Network Security Guard
- Anthony DeSando as Officer Benson
- John Ventimiglia as A Team Leader
- Grant Rosenmeyer as Dave
- Greta Lee as Amy
- Charlie Thurston as Ryan
- Laura Meakin as Wall Street Woman
- Cenk Uygur as Himself

== Production ==
=== Development ===
The project Money Monster was first announced by Deadline on February 7, 2012, when Daniel Dubiecki launched his own film production company, The Allegiance Theater. It would be the company's first produced film. IM Global financed while Dubiecki produced, along with Stuart Ford.

Alan Di Fiore and Jim Kouf wrote the script of the film. On October 11, 2012, Jodie Foster was set to direct the film. Lara Alameddine also produced the film. The story was altered from its original script inspired by the stock market glitch and crash of Cynk Technologies.

On July 25, 2014, TriStar Pictures won the rights to finance and release the film, whose latest draft was written by Jamie Linden. Clooney and Grant Heslov also produced for their Smoke House Pictures.

=== Casting ===
On May 8, 2014, it was announced that George Clooney was director Foster's choice to star in the film as a TV personality, Lee Gates, but the deal was not yet confirmed. Clooney's involvement was confirmed in July 2014. Jack O'Connell and Julia Roberts were added to the cast November 14, 2014 to star along with Clooney in the film. Caitriona Balfe joined the cast of the film on January 29, 2015, to play the head of PR of the company whose stock bottomed. Dominic West signed-on on February 25, 2015, to play the CEO of the company. Christopher Denham also joined the cast on March 4, 2015, playing Ron, a producer on the show.

=== Filming ===
In October 2012, filming was scheduled to begin early 2013. In July 2014, it was announced that production would begin after Clooney completed the Coen brothers' Hail, Caesar!, and principal photography on the film began in New York City on February 27, 2015.

On April 8, filming began on Wall Street in the Financial District, Manhattan, where it would last for 15 days. A scene was also shot in front of Federal Hall National Memorial. Some re-shooting for the film took place in mid-January 2016 in New York City on William Street and Broad Street.

== Release ==
In August 2015, Sony Pictures Entertainment set the film for an April 8, 2016 release. The film was later pushed back to May 13, 2016. The film premiered in Cannes on May 12, 2016, where the cast attended the photocall and screening in the evening.

== Reception ==
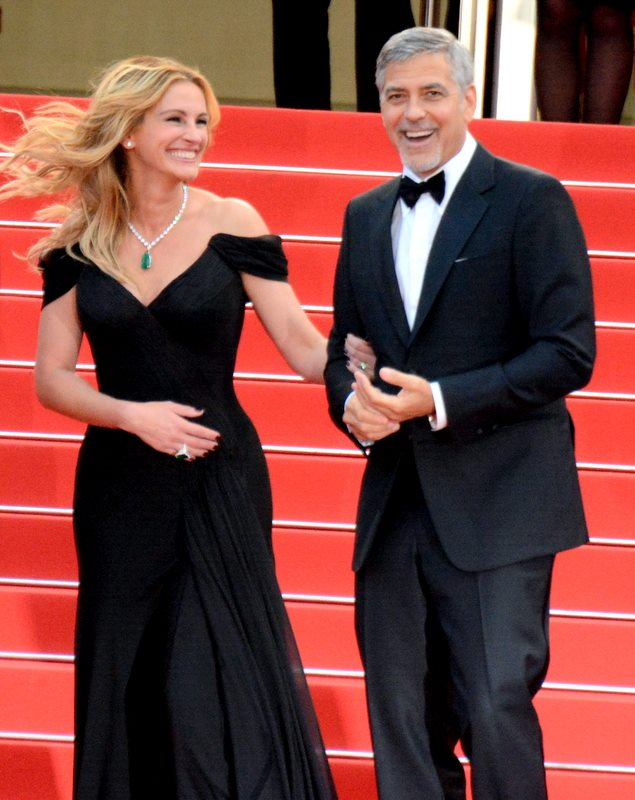
Julia Roberts and George Clooney attending the premiere of the film at the 2016 Cannes Film Festival

=== Box office ===
Money Monster grossed $41 million in the United States and Canada, and $52.3 million in other territories, for a worldwide total of $93.3 million, against a net production budget of $27 million.

In North America, the film was released alongside The Darkness and the wide expansion of Green Room, and was projected to gross $10–12 million from 3,104 theaters in its opening weekend. The film grossed $600,000 from its early Thursday night previews and $5 million on its first day. It went on to gross $14.8 million in its opening weekend, beating expectations and finishing 3rd at the box office behind Captain America: Civil War ($72.6 million) and The Jungle Book ($17.1 million). It fell 53% to $7 million in its second weekend, finishing 6th.

=== Critical response ===
On Rotten Tomatoes, the film holds an approval rating of 59%, based on 280 reviews, with an average rating of 6/10. The site's critics consensus reads: "Money Monster's strong cast and solidly written story ride a timely wave of socioeconomic anger that's powerful enough to overcome an occasionally muddled approach to its worthy themes." On Metacritic, the film has a weighted average score of 55 out of 100, based on 44 critics, indicating "mixed or average reviews". Audiences polled by CinemaScore gave the film an average grade of "B+" on an A+ to F scale, while PostTrak reported filmgoers gave an 81% overall positive score, with 56% saying they would definitely recommend it.

Clooney's performance was praised by critics. A. O. Scott of The New York Times said that the "quality of the acting both enhances the credibility of the narrative and exposes some of its weak points." Christy Lemire of RogerEbert.com, in a mixed review, praised Clooney's "enormous charisma", but criticized the film for not "being quite as thrilling or thought-provoking as [its] premise sounds." Chris Hewitt of Empire however gave a more positive review.

Several reviewers praised the atmosphere of suspense. Sandra Hall of The Sydney Morning Herald praised the film, particularly Foster's directing and her ability to "keep things moving". Richard Brody of The New Yorker wrote that Foster "keeps the action vigorous and the suspense high", but said that the film was "swallowed up by the very hectoring and impersonal sensationalism that it derides."

Some reviewers criticized the script. Wendy Ide of The Observer gave the film a negative review, writing that the film lacks the "authentic anger" of The Big Short and the "sniper-like accuracy" of Network, criticizing Clooney's "complete lack of sincerity". Peter Travers of Rolling Stone said that what the script lacks in "emotional subtext" can be found in the cast's "richly detailed" performances. In a mixed review, Robbie Collin of The Telegraph called the film a "raucous hostage thriller that eschews explanation for wish-fulfillment", concluding by saying that "in the heat of the moment, Money Monster's bluster and nerve keeps you hooked." Josh Lasser of IGN was critical of the film's mix of comedy and drama, calling the transitions "too fast, ripping the audience out of the unfolding drama."

Despite comparisons of Clooney's character to Jim Cramer and his TV show Mad Money, Clooney and Foster denied this.
