= 10 Years (2011 film) =

Film by Jamie Linden

- Theatrical release poster
- Directed by: Jamie Linden
- Written by: Jamie Linden
- Produced by: Marty Bowen; Reid Carolin; Wyck Godfrey; Channing Tatum
- Starring: Channing Tatum; Jenna Dewan; Justin Long; Kate Mara; Rosario Dawson; Lynn Collins; Brian Geraghty; Ari Graynor; Oscar Isaac; Ron Livingston; Anthony Mackie; Max Minghella; Aubrey Plaza; Scott Porter; Chris Pratt; Aaron Yoo
- Cinematography: Steve Fierberg
- Edited by: Jake Pushinsky
- Music by: Chad Fischer
- Production companies: Boss Media; Temple Hill Entertainment; Iron Horse
- Distributed by: Anchor Bay Films
- Release dates: September 12, 2011 (TIFF); September 14, 2012 (United States)
- Running time: 101 minutes
- Country: United States
- Language: English
- Box office: $987,640

10 Years is a 2011 American independent romantic comedy film written and directed by Jamie Linden in his directorial debut. It stars an ensemble cast including Channing Tatum, Jenna Dewan, Justin Long, Kate Mara, Rosario Dawson, Oscar Isaac, Lynn Collins, Chris Pratt, Scott Porter, Brian Geraghty, Aubrey Plaza, and Anthony Mackie. It was released September 14, 2012, in select theaters.

== Plot ==
On the day of their 10-year high school reunion, Jake and his girlfriend Jess arrive at the home of his now-married high school friends Cully and Sam. Other friends begin to arrive, including best friends Marty and AJ, famous musician Reeves, and the adventurous Scott with his wife, Suki. They depart for the reunion and reunite with their friend Garrity and meet his wife Olivia; and reconnect with Garrity's best friend Andre. Meanwhile, reclusive classmate Elise arrives at the reunion alone. She is ignored by the party planner, prom queen Anna.

Jake, Cully, Andre, and Reeves smoke a joint in Jake's car when he reveals an envelope with an engagement ring inside, stating that he has intended to ask Jess to marry him for quite some time but hasn't found the right moment to propose. However, Jake is conflicted when he sees his high school sweetheart Mary and her new husband Paul. The two couples share awkward introductions, as Jake and Mary reconnect for the first time in eight years. Reeves approaches Elise and the pair reminisce when he spots an old picture of her wearing bright yellow shoes.

As the night continues, Olivia unexpectedly discovers that Garrity has an affinity for hip hop, Cully drunkenly attempts and fails to appropriately apologize to some geeky classmates for bullying them in high school, and Marty and AJ attempt to flirt with Anna, causing tension between the duo. Jake and Mary discuss prom, which they couldn't attend as Mary's father had a heart attack that night.

As the reunion comes to a close, the group departs for a local karaoke bar. Reeves flirts with Elise but she turns him down. As Anna leaves the party early, Marty and AJ decide to toilet paper her house. At the bar, Jess takes notice of Jake's behavior around Mary and decides to return to the hotel under the guise of being tired. Paul does the same. Scott and Suki sing karaoke and Olivia is impressed by Garrity's breakdancing abilities.

Reeves is pressured by his friends to sing his hit song "Never Had", about the girl he misses. The line about bright yellow shoes makes Elise, who had never heard the song, realize it is about her. The two share a kiss and spend the remainder of the night together.

Anna catches Marty and AJ vandalizing her home and becomes upset, revealing that she is now an unhappy single mother with two children. Marty reveals that he is not a successful New Yorker, but instead lives in a small apartment and is financially unstable, and AJ reveals that he is getting a divorce. The trio bond over their shared life issues.

As the night comes to a close, Cully becomes embarrassingly drunk and upsets Sam. Scott reveals to his friends that he intends on returning to Japan with Suki to continue their adventures together. Mary asks Jake for the dance they never had at prom, finally giving them an opportunity to properly end their relationship. Mary reveals that she's pregnant, the two agree that they are happy with where their lives have taken them. Jake returns to the hotel and finds Jess still awake. She reveals she left so he could get his closure with Mary.

Jake and Jess soon join their friends at a local diner. He returns to his car to get the engagement ring from the envelope.

== Cast ==
- Channing Tatum as Jake
- Jenna Dewan-Tatum as Jess
- Justin Long as Marty
- Max Minghella as AJ
- Oscar Isaac as Reeves
- Chris Pratt as Cully
- Ari Graynor as Sam
- Scott Porter as Scott
- Eiko Nijo as Suki
- Brian Geraghty as Garrity
- Aubrey Plaza as Olivia
- Kate Mara as Elise
- Lynn Collins as Anna
- Anthony Mackie as Andre
- Rosario Dawson as Mary
- Ron Livingston as Paul
- Aaron Yoo as Peter

== Production ==
A short film titled Ten Year was produced in 2011 by Channing Tatum to attract financing for the feature film.

The film was produced by Marty Bowen, Reid Carolin, Wyck Godfrey and Channing Tatum, and the screenplay was written by Jamie Linden. Location shooting took place in and around Albuquerque, New Mexico.

== Release ==
The film had a red carpet premiere at the Toronto International Film Festival on September 12, 2011. It would be a year before the film received a limited theatrical release, on September 14, 2012.

The film was released on home video on December 17, 2012.

== Reception ==
=== Critical response ===
On the review aggregator website Rotten Tomatoes, 60% of 58 critics' reviews are positive, with an average rating of 5.9/10. The website's consensus reads: "A sweet ensemble comedy about a high school reunion, 10 Years is well cast but unfortunately predictable and short on three dimensional characters." Metacritic, which uses a weighted average, assigned the film a score of 67 out of 100, based on 20 critics, indicating "generally favorable" reviews.

Gary Goldstein of the Los Angeles Times called it "largely engaging" but that "there’s a lot of been-there, done-that going on." David Rooney of The Hollywood Reporter says the film "pulls us in eventually, delivering its share of poignant insights and melancholy reflections, even if it does all feel a tad familiar." Patrick Bromley, reviewing the home video release, stated that while "it traffics in the familiar, 10 Years is not a movie of gigantic revelations. It is a movie of small truths, usually well observed."

=== Box office ===
10 Years grossed $203,654 in the United States and Canada, and $782,986 in other territories, for a worldwide total of $987,640.
