= Viveik Kalra =

English actor

- Born: Windsor and Maidenhead, Berkshire, England
- Education: Royal Welsh College of Music & Drama
- Occupation: Actor
- Years active: 2016–present
- Notable work: Blinded by the Light

Viveik Kalra (/vɪˈvɛk ˈkɑːlrə/) is an English actor. His breakout role came in the film Blinded by the Light (2019), directed by Gurinder Chadha.

== Early life and education ==
Kalra was born in Windsor and Maidenhead, Berkshire to a British-born Indian father and Indian-born mother of Punjabi Hindu descent. He was raised in Windsor, where he became a fan of Indian films and American hip hop.

Kalra went to boarding school at Hurtwood House for sixth form. He was in his first year at the Royal Welsh College of Music & Drama in Cardiff in 2016 when he left after being cast in his first role.

== Career ==
Kalra's first job was in the 2018 ITV miniseries Next of Kin, which came after he sent a video audition. In 2019, he also starred in another ITV miniseries, Gurinder Chadha's historical drama Beecham House. He was cast as Javed Khan in Blinded by the Light, about a British-Pakistani teen inspired by Bruce Springsteen in 1987, after singing "Born to Run" in the audition. For his role as Javed, Kalra was nominated as Best Actor at the 2019 SIFF.

He stars as Peter in the science fiction film Voyagers, along with Tye Sheridan, Fionn Whitehead, Colin Farrell and Lily-Rose Depp.

In 2022, he starred as Troye Sivan's love interest in the film Three Months.

In 2023, he signed on to co-star with Shruti Haasan in the cross-cultural romantic comedy film titled "Chennai Story," which is directed by Philip John.

== Filmography ==
=== Film ===
Year	Film	Role	Notes	Ref.
2019	Blinded by the Light	Javed Khan		
2021	Voyagers	Peter		
2022	Three Months	Estha		
2024	Lift	Luke		
2026	Monitor	Sariq		
TBA	Chennai Story			

=== Television ===
Year	Film	Role	Notes
2018	Next of Kin	Danish Shirani	TV mini-series
2019	Beecham House	Baadal	TV mini-series
