= Henry Braham =

British cinematographer

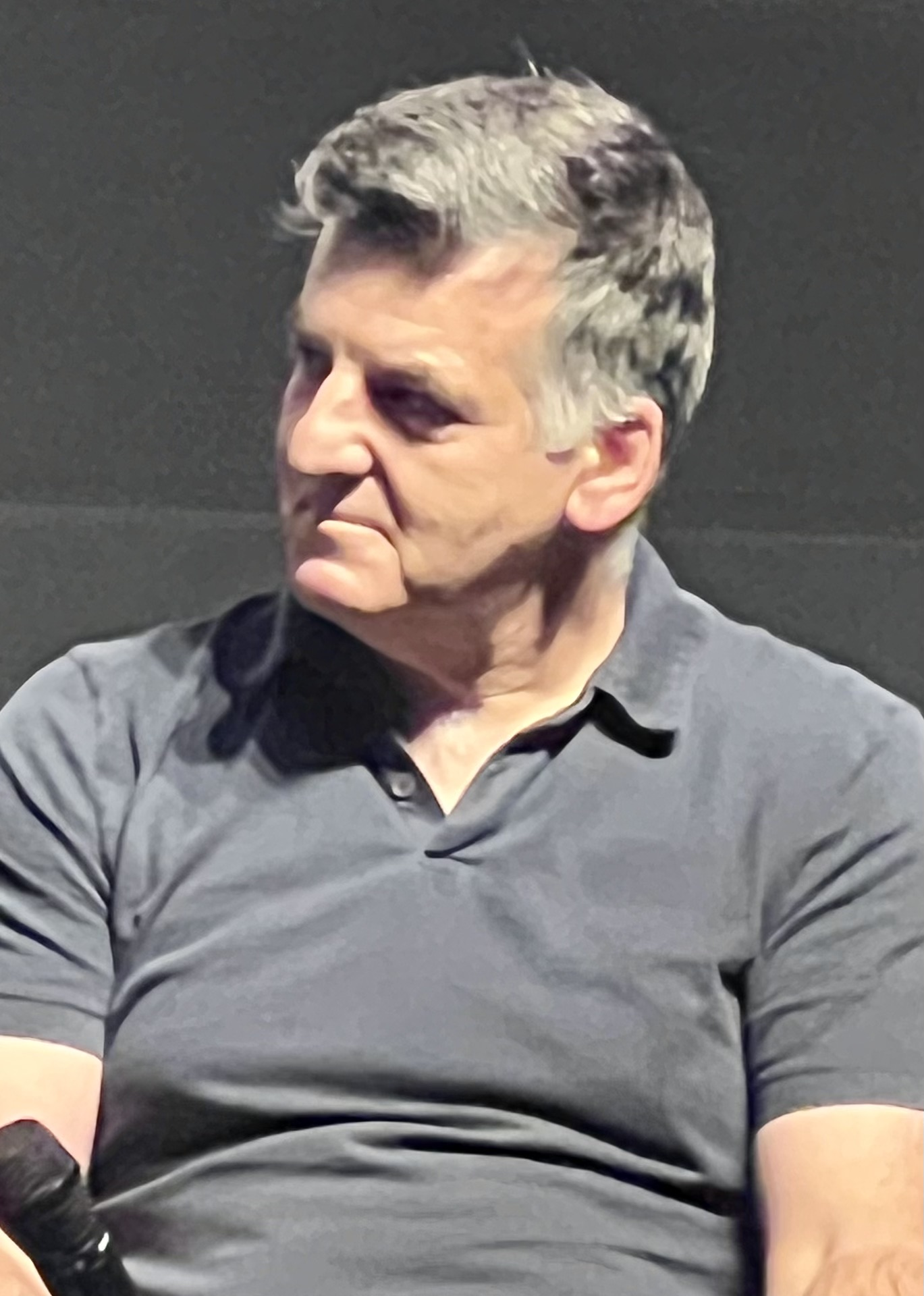
- Braham in 2025
- Born: October 30, 1965 (age 60); England
- Years active: 1988–present

Henry Braham BSC (born 30 October 1965) is an English cinematographer and commercial director.

== Life and career ==
Braham’s cinematographic career began in 1989 with the British band The KLF working on their 1991 road movie, The White Room. He won an Emmy Award for Outstanding Cinematography for a Limited Series for his work on the miniseries Shackleton.

Known for implementing warm lighting, a very stylized color grading, and sometimes applying fisheye lens, Braham works mostly in big-budget films with a heavy focus on visual effects, especially in films directed by James Gunn.

He has also directed several commercials. In 2013, Braham has also designed the lighting for the sellout exhibition, “Hats: An Anthology by Stephen Jones” for the Victoria and Albert Museum.

Braham is a member of the British Society of Cinematographers and is also the co-founder of the Good Hemp Food brand with Glynis Murray.

== Filmography ==
=== Film ===
Year	Title	Director	Notes
1992	Soft Top Hard Shoulder	Stefan Schwartz	
1997	Roseanna's Grave	Paul Weiland	
1997	Shooting Fish	Stefan Schwartz	
1998	The Land Girls	David Leland	
1998	Waking Ned	Kirk Jones	
2001	The Invisible Circus	Adam Brooks	
2001	Crush	John McKay	
2003	Bright Young Things	Stephen Fry	
2005	Nanny McPhee	Kirk Jones	
2006	Flyboys	Tony Bill	
2007	The Golden Compass	Chris Weitz	
2009	Everybody's Fine	Kirk Jones	
2016	The Legend of Tarzan	David Yates	
2017	Guardians of the Galaxy Vol. 2	James Gunn	1st collaboration with Gunn
2019	Georgetown	Christoph Waltz	
2019	Maleficent: Mistress of Evil	Joachim Rønning	
2021	The Suicide Squad	James Gunn	
2021	Cinderella	Kay Cannon	
2023	Guardians of the Galaxy Vol. 3	James Gunn	
2023	The Flash	Andy Muschietti	
2024	Road House	Doug Liman	1st collaboration with Liman
2024	The Instigators	Doug Liman	
2025	Superman	James Gunn	
2027	Mister †	Wade Eastwood	Filming
TBA	Bitcoin †	Doug Liman	Post-production
TBA	The Price of Peace †	Anthony McCarten	Filming

=== Television ===
Year	Title	Director	Notes
1996	Giving Tongue	Stefan Schwartz	TV movie
1998	The Comic Strip Presents...	Peter Richardson	Episode "Four Men in a Car"
2002	Shackleton	Charles Sturridge	Miniseries
2009	10 Minute Tales	Neil Gaiman	Episode "Statuesque"
2015	The Bastard Executioner	Paris Barclay	Episode "Pilot" (Part 1 & 2)
2022	The Guardians of the Galaxy Holiday Special	James Gunn	TV special

== Awards and nominations ==
Award	Year	Category	Title	Result
British Academy Television Craft Award	2003	Best Photography & Lighting: Fiction	Shackleton	Nominated
Primetime Emmy Awards	2002	Outstanding Cinematography for a Limited Series	Shackleton	Won
Satellite Awards	2007	Best Cinematography	The Golden Compass	Nominated
