= Wonderful World (2009 film) =

2009 film

- Theatrical release poster
- Directed by: Joshua Goldin
- Written by: Joshua Goldin
- Produced by: Miranda Bailey; Matthew Leutwyler; Glenn Williamson
- Starring: Matthew Broderick; Sanaa Lathan; Michael K. Williams; Jodelle Ferland; Jesse Tyler Ferguson; Ally Walker; Philip Baker Hall
- Cinematography: Daniel Shulman
- Edited by: Jeff Canavan
- Music by: Craig Richey
- Production companies: Ambush Entertainment; Back Lot Pictures; Cold Iron Pictures
- Distributed by: Magnolia Pictures
- Release dates: April 27, 2009 (Tribeca); June 18, 2010
- Running time: 89 minutes
- Country: United States
- Language: English
- Budget: $3 million
- Box office: $9,309

Wonderful World is a 2010 dark comedy drama film written and directed by Joshua Goldin, and starring Matthew Broderick, Sanaa Lathan, Michael K. Williams, Jodelle Ferland, Jesse Tyler Ferguson, Ally Walker, and Philip Baker Hall. It is Goldin's directorial debut. The story revolves around a misanthropic, former children's folk singer having his life changed after his Senegalese roommate goes into a diabetic coma, and the sister who arrives to take care of him that he falls in love with.

The film was produced by Ambush Entertainment, Back Lot Pictures and Cold Iron Pictures, with K5 International handling the world sales. Filming took place over 21 days in Shreveport, Louisiana, with a $3 million budget financed by producer Miranda Bailey through Ambush Entertainment. It made its world premiere on April 27, 2009, at the Tribeca Film Festival, got picked up by Magnolia Pictures for distribution, and was given a limited release in June 2010. Wonderful World garnered a mixed reception from critics over the script's unoriginality and numerous indie film clichés, but were universally positive towards Broderick's performance.

== Plot ==
Ben Singer is a former children's folk singer whose misanthropic worldview leads him to an isolated existence. When his Senegalese roommate Ibou falls into a diabetic coma and is taken to the hospital, his sister Khadi arrives from Senegal to take care of him. After Khadi and Ben eventually fall in love, circumstances lead Ben to reconsider his way of thinking.

== Cast ==
- Matthew Broderick as Ben Singer
- Sanaa Lathan as Khadi
- Michael K. Williams as Ibou
- Jodelle Ferland as Sandra
- Philip Baker Hall as The Man
- Jesse Tyler Ferguson as Cyril
- Patrick Carney as Evan
- Ally Walker as Eliza
- Dan Zanes as Sweeny
- David L. J. George as the Male Nurse

== Production ==
Michael K. Williams initially didn't audition for the role of Ibou because he felt the phone messages from writer-director Joshua Goldin's representatives were "a mass call", saying: "I thought, I'm not going to waste my time. Then Josh called me back a few times and said he wanted me. So I went in." Williams had already worked on the character's Senegalese accent while in Tuscany filming Spike Lee's Miracle at St. Anna (2008), befriending someone to help portray the character and pronounce the Senegal language. After Matthew Broderick signed on to Goldin's project to play Ben Singer, he got some financiers to back the film through his Creative Arts agency. Four days before pre-production, half of the film's budget was cut after its Canadian investors backed out of the project. Producer Miranda Bailey was able to finance the whole film through her production company Ambush Entertainment. The filmmakers moved the project to Shreveport, Louisiana to make use of its tax incentives, and shot the movie over 21 days.

== Reception ==
Wonderful World garnered mixed reviews from critics. On the review aggregator website Rotten Tomatoes, 42% of 31 critics' reviews are positive, with an average rating of 5/10. The website's consensus reads: "Matthew Broderick gives an appealing performance and director Joshua Goldin's script contains unexpected bursts of honest emotion, but Wonderful World's good intentions can't make up for its lack of originality." Metacritic, which uses a weighted average, assigned the film a score of 48 out of 100, based on 15 critics, indicating "mixed or average" reviews.

The A.V. Club's Scott Tobias and Entertainment Weekly's Owen Gleiberman both gave the film an overall C grade, the former calling it "a paint-by-numbers tale of redemption for a man whose wounds are mostly self-inflicted" and the latter saying, "[I]t's all very sincere, but watching a dweebish depressive learn that Life Is Good is a lesson of diminishing returns." Nick Schager of Slant Magazine called it "a checklist-indie that offers up clichés with gusto equal to that of its earnestness", criticizing Dan Zanes' "sorrowful score" and Ben's overall arc feeling "stock" and having "doggedly implausible" circumstances that lead to a "preordained conclusion", concluding that: "Goldin's mush about learning to stop and smell the roses is pretty close to being bottom-of-the-barrel." James Berardinelli felt the film was "lightweight and inconsequential" with its subject matter when compared to the similarly themed The Visitor and is hampered by "unconvincing performances" led by a "woefully miscast" Broderick, concluding that: "I suppose Wonderful World could be considered a "feel good" motion picture, but it's the kind of movie in which the upbeat ending doesn't wholly justify the discomfort of getting there. The direction and writing are purely TV-movie-of-the-week quality. The experience is so unremarkable that spending any money on it is overly generous."

Frank Scheck of The Hollywood Reporter praised the performances of Broderick, Ferland and Lathan, and wrote about Wonderful World overall: "While the film easily might have gone in an overly treacly direction, Goldin manages to avoid it, thanks to some unpredictable plot twists that subvert our expectations based on years of feel-good movies." New York film critic David Edelstein, gave the film a positive review stating "the movie is unfailingly likable and finally impressive." Stephen Holden of The New York Times praised Broderick for emitting "the right attitude" for his role and the soundtrack's mixture of "African guitar music" and "folk-pop songs" for giving off "little dashes of ebullience" and "a whimsical sweetness" respectively, but was critical of Philip Baker Hall's "infrequent" appearances throughout the movie, concluding that "he throws this delicate, intelligent film, which at its best suggests a muted hybrid of The Visitor and It's a Wonderful Life, off balance." Dan Kois of The Washington Post wrote: "If the components of Wonderful World seem a little tired, the film still has its own low-key pleasures, thanks to Broderick's restrained performance and a script that punctuates the inescapable saccharine of its storyline with tart little bursts of anger."

== Soundtrack ==
All music is composed by Craig Richey.

Wonderful World (Original Motion Picture Soundtrack)
No.	Title	Length
1.	"Main Title"	1:57
2.	"Ben Meets The Man"	2:09
3.	"Ibu Lies In The Street"	2:07
4.	"Ben Find's Khadi's Picture"	1:42
5.	"Ben Gets Fired"	1:34
6.	"My Name Is Khadi"	0:39
7.	"Khadi Buys Shoes"	1:04
8.	"Sandra At The Window"	1:02
9.	"Ben Makes A U-Turn"	0:40
10.	"Khadi's Ritual"	2:54
11.	"Ben & Khadi's Kiss"	0:51
12.	"Ben Confronts His Ex"	2:07
13.	"Out Of Gas"	0:51
14.	"You Wore Her Out"	1:29
15.	"I Am Greedy"	1:53
16.	"Ben's Closing Argument"	1:43
17.	"The Note"	0:20
18.	"A False Accusation"	2:07
19.	"Ibe Dies"	2:00
20.	"Goodbye Khadi"	1:58
21.	"It Rains Fish"	2:42
22.	"What About The Man"	1:21
Total length:		25:44

== See also ==
- List of films featuring diabetes
