= Seekers of Infinite Love =

- Directed by: Victoria Strouse
- Written by: Victoria Strouse
- Produced by: Dylan Sellers; Chris Parker; Marty Bowen; Wyck Godfrey
- Starring: Hannah Einbinder; Justin Theroux; John Reynolds; Griffin Gluck; Justine Lupe; Greg Kinnear
- Cinematography: Tim Suhrstedt
- Edited by: Kheireddine El-Helou
- Music by: Jake Monaco
- Production companies: Limelight; Temple Hill Entertainment
- Release date: March 12, 2026 (SXSW)
- Running time: 91 minutes
- Country: United States
- Language: English

Seekers of Infinite Love is a 2026 American comedy film written and directed by Victoria Strouse.

The film premiered at the SXSW on March 12, 2026.

== Plot ==
Three estranged siblings reunite for a road trip to Kentucky after their youngest sister joins a cult. With help from a professional deprogrammer, they confront family issues while trying to bring her home.

== Cast ==
- Hannah Einbinder as Kayla Bachman
- Justin Theroux
- John Reynolds
- Griffin Gluck
- Justine Lupe
- Greg Kinnear
- Sophia Duncan

== Production ==
In August 2014, it was reported that Victoria Strouse would be directing a new comedy film titled The Seekers of Perpetual Love, in which her script was feature on The Black List in 2008. Hannah Einbinder, Justin Theroux, John Reynolds, Griffin Gluck, Justine Lupe, and Greg Kinnear were revealed as part of the cast by February 2026, with the film being retitled to Seekers of Infinite Love.

== Release ==
Seekers of Infinite Love premiered at the SXSW on March 12, 2026.
