= Blinded by the Light (2019 film) =

2019 film directed by Gurinder Chadha

- British theatrical release poster
- Directed by: Gurinder Chadha
- Written by: Paul Mayeda Berges; Gurinder Chadha; Sarfraz Manzoor
- Based on: Greetings from Bury Park: Race, Religion, and Rock n' Roll by Sarfraz Manzoor
- Produced by: Jane Barclay; Gurinder Chadha; Jamal Daniel
- Starring: Viveik Kalra; Kulvinder Ghir; Meera Ganatra; Nell Williams; Aaron Phagura; Dean-Charles Chapman
- Cinematography: Ben Smithard
- Edited by: Justin Krish
- Music by: A. R. Rahman
- Production companies: Levantine Films; Ingenious Media; Bend It Films; Cornerstone Films
- Distributed by: Entertainment One (United Kingdom, Australia and New Zealand); New Line Cinema; Warner Bros. Pictures (Select territories)
- Release dates: 27 January 2019 (Sundance); 9 August 2019 (United Kingdom); 16 August 2019 (United States)
- Running time: 117 minutes
- Countries: United Kingdom; United States
- Language: English
- Budget: $15 million
- Box office: $19.6 million

Blinded by the Light (also known as Music of My Life) is a 2019 comedy-drama film directed by Gurinder Chadha. It was inspired by the life of journalist Sarfraz Manzoor and his love of the works of Bruce Springsteen. Manzoor co-wrote the script with Chadha and Paul Mayeda Berges, based on his 2007 memoir Greetings from Bury Park: Race, Religion, and Rock n' Roll. Set in the town of Luton in 1987 Britain, the film tells the coming-of-age story of Javed, a British-Pakistani Muslim teenager whose life is changed after he discovers the music of Springsteen. Viveik Kalra stars in the lead role, along with Hayley Atwell, Rob Brydon, Kulvinder Ghir, and Nell Williams in supporting roles.

The film premiered at the 2019 Sundance Film Festival and was released by Entertainment One in the United Kingdom on 9 August 2019, and New Line Cinema in the United States and several other countries on 16 August 2019 via parent company Warner Bros. Pictures. Blinded by the Light received positive reviews from critics, and also received nominations for Best Film and Best Actor (for Kalra) at the 2019 SIFF Awards.

== Plot ==
In 1987, Javed Khan and his family – Pakistani migrant parents Malik and Noor with younger sister Shazia and older cousin Yasmeen – live in Luton, England, during the premiership of Margaret Thatcher. Javed likes contemporary pop music, which Malik disapproves of. Javed writes poetry and lyrics for his best friend Matt's band, but Matt criticises these as depressing.

Javed feels out of place at his new sixth form college, where he is one of two British Asian students; the other, Roops, a Sikh, is a fan of Bruce Springsteen. During lunch, Roops approaches him and gives him two Springsteen cassette tapes, calling Springsteen "the direct line to all that is true in this shitty world". In Ms Clay's writing class, Javed develops a crush on fellow student and Red Wedge activist Eliza. Javed talks to Ms Clay after class about his poetry and diaries and she encourages him to consider writing as a career. Javed faces constant racism from his peers and neighbours, and Malik forbids him to socialise, insisting he "follow the Jews" in his college because of their success as a people.

Javed is denied any opportunity to write for the student paper. Vauxhall Motors lays off much of their workforce, including Malik who had worked there for sixteen years, as the 1987 financial crash and recession hits manufacturing. His mother takes on extra sewing work to pay the bills. Frustrated by racism and Malik's inability to understand him, Javed discards his poems on the night of the great storm of 1987. After listening to the Springsteen tapes, the lyrics speak to him, and he recovers his poems. At college, Javed excitedly tells Roops that Springsteen knows exactly how he feels. Inspired to continue writing, he shares his poetry with Ms Clay. The next-door neighbour, Mr Evans, recovers one of Javed's poems that decries the National Front as 'scum'. As a Second World War ex-serviceman, Mr Evans sympathises with Javed's feelings and calls the poem brilliant, but Javed's parents are less appreciative.

Javed submits a piece about Springsteen to the student newspaper, which is accepted. Malik is worried about finding the money for Yasmeen's upcoming wedding. Javed takes a Saturday job with Matt's father, also a Springsteen fan, on his market stall. Matt's father helps Javed impress Eliza by serenading her with a Springsteen song. In the process, Javed upsets Matt by seeming to side with his father as he taunts Matt about his poor musical taste and his band.

Javed asks out Eliza and, steeling his nerves with Springsteen songs, the two enjoy a date and kiss. Javed writes poems about Eliza, which she loves. Ms Clay enjoys his poems and article and arranges an unpaid internship for Javed at the Luton Herald. Malik and his wife have to sell her dowry jewellery. Malik does not help his wife with the sewing even though he insists Javed and his sisters help. Javed points this out when his dad objects to him taking the unpaid work experience and his dad responds by saying his biggest mistake was moving to Britain.

Javed learns of growing tensions between the Muslim community and the National Front, who have organised a march and hung a pig's head at the local mosque. Eliza invites Javed to dinner with her conservative and racially insensitive parents who imply that she is only with him out of rebellion. Javed later says if she is with him to annoy them, that would be fine by him.

At The Herald, Javed gets paid after an article he wrote about racism is chosen for the front page and decides to use the money to buy tickets for a Springsteen concert. On the morning of Yasmeen's wedding, while Javed runs to the shops to buy tickets, his family arrives separately at the venue and National Front members assault Malik. Upset that Javed withheld money from the family and had dishonoured Malik and the wedding, Malik tells Javed to surrender the tickets, but Javed says the tickets are his and they fight. Malik says Javed will go to a university in Luton and Javed states that Luton does not have a university and that he will go to the University of Manchester instead. At this, Malik rips up the tickets. Having had enough of his father, Javed pushes and stuns Malik by telling him he does not want to be his son as he wants to be more than that.

At college, Eliza chastises Javed for abandoning his family on his cousin's wedding day, and then for using his family as an excuse for no longer seeing her. In class, Ms Clay tells Javed that his Springsteen essay won him attendance to a lecture at Monmouth College in New Jersey, near where Springsteen grew up. Javed initially declines, knowing his father will not allow him to go, but later changes his mind when he sees more racist graffiti. Malik says America is a bad place and tells Javed that if he leaves, he will not be allowed to return.

Javed and Roops enjoy an inspiring trip to the States. Back home, with Javed staying with Roops, Noor tells Malik to reconcile with Javed and reminds him that he left his own family and country at a young age and that they will ultimately lose Javed should Malik refuse. When Javed is asked to read his essay at the 1988 college prize-giving event, Eliza persuades Javed's family to attend. Instead of reading his original essay, Javed talks about being "blinded by the light" of Springsteen and his own dreams and being willing to abandon his friends and family along the way. He recognises his father's struggles and the way his community has shaped him, saying he must "build a bridge to my ambitions, but not a wall between my family and me". Everyone is moved. Javed reconciles with Eliza and thanks her for inviting his family. Malik reconciles with Javed and tells him that he has read Springsteen's lyrics and admires the themes of working hard and respecting one's family. Before going to Manchester, Javed sells his Springsteen memorabilia to reclaim his mother's jewellery. As Javed leaves for university, he and Malik listen to the Boss together.

== Cast ==
- Viveik Kalra as Javed Khan
  - Ronak Chadha Berges as ten-year-old Javed
- Kulvinder Ghir as Malik Khan, Javed's father
- Meera Ganatra as Noor Khan, Javed's mother
- Nell Williams as Eliza
- Aaron Phagura as Roops
- Dean-Charles Chapman as Matt
  - Billy Barratt as ten-year-old Matt
- Nikita Mehta as Shazia Khan, Javed's sister
- Tara Divina as Yasmeen, Javed's cousin
- David Hayman as Mr Evans, neighbour
- Sally Phillips as Mrs Anderson, college principal
- Marcus Brigstocke as Robert, Eliza's father
- Olivia Poulet as Frances, Eliza's mother
- Frankie Fox as Colin Hand
- Jeff Mirza as Mr Shah
- Lorraine Ashbourne as Kathy
- Rob Brydon as Matt's father
- Hayley Atwell as Ms Clay, English teacher

== Soundtrack ==
Springsteen allowed twelve of his songs to be used in the soundtrack and it features several Springsteen rarities, including the first performance of "The River", from the No Nukes concerts at Madison Square Garden in 1979 and an acoustic rendition of "The Promised Land" that Springsteen performed in 2014 at Washington, D.C.'s National Mall. The soundtrack also showcases a number of Springsteen's classics such as "Badlands", "Hungry Heart" and a 1975 acoustic recording of "Thunder Road" performed at The Roxy Theatre.

The soundtrack contains a previously unreleased Springsteen song "I'll Stand by You", which was originally written for inclusion in Harry Potter and the Philosopher's Stone.

=== Track listing ===
Blinded by the Light: Music from the Motion Picture
No.	Title	Artist	Length
1.	"Ode to Javed / Javed's Poem"	A. R. Rahman
2.	"It's a Sin"	Pet Shop Boys
3.	"The Sun Always Shines on T.V."	a-ha
4.	"The Boss of Us All" (dialogue)
5.	"Dancing in the Dark"	Bruce Springsteen
6.	"You Should Be Listening to Our Music" (dialogue)
7.	"I Never Knew Music Could Be Like This" (dialogue)
8.	"The River" (live at Madison Square Garden, New York, NY, 21 September 1979; previously unavailable on an album)	Bruce Springsteen & The E Street Band
9.	"Number One Paki Film" (dialogue)
10.	"Badlands"	Bruce Springsteen
11.	"Cover Me"	Bruce Springsteen
12.	"Thunder Road" (live at The Roxy Theater, West Hollywood, CA, 18 October 1975)	Bruce Springsteen & The E Street Band
13.	"Get Outta My Way Fascist Pigs"	Amer Chadha-Patel
14.	"Do It for Me" (dialogue)
15.	"Prove It All Night"	Bruce Springsteen
16.	"Hungry Heart"	Bruce Springsteen
17.	"You, Me and Bruce" (dialogue)
18.	"Because the Night"	Bruce Springsteen
19.	"Maar Chadapa"	Heera
20.	"The Promised Land" (live on the National Mall, Washington, DC, 11 November 2014)	Bruce Springsteen
21.	"Blinded by the Light"	Bruce Springsteen
22.	"Born to Run"	Bruce Springsteen
23.	"I'll Stand by You" (previously unreleased studio recording)	Bruce Springsteen
24.	"For You My Love" (new original song for film)	A. R. Rahman

== Reception ==
=== Box office ===
Blinded by the Light grossed $19.6 million worldwide.

In Canada and the United States, the film was released alongside Where'd You Go, Bernadette, 47 Meters Down: Uncaged and Good Boys, and was projected to gross around $4 million from 2,307 cinemas in its opening weekend. It made $1.4 million on its first day, and went on to debut to $4.5 million, finishing ninth. Rival studios argued that Warner Bros. should have begun with a limited release to build audience interest, and that the film's August date was too close to that of Yesterday, a film that also depicts a young British Asian male inspired by a classic popular music act.

=== Critical response ===
On review aggregator Rotten Tomatoes, the film holds an approval rating of 89% based on 261 reviews, with an average rating of 7.3/10. The site's consensus reads: "Like a life-affirming rock anthem, Blinded by the Light hits familiar chords with confidence and flair, building to a conclusion that leaves audiences cheering for an encore." On Metacritic, the film has a weighted average score of 71 out of 100, based on 44 critics, indicating "generally favorable" reviews. Audiences polled by CinemaScore gave the film an average grade of "A−" on an A+ to F scale, while those at PostTrak gave it an average 4.5 out of 5 stars.

Johnny Oleksinski of The New York Post calls it "the feel-good movie of the year". Jordan Ruimy of The Playlist calls it "one of the most joyous and exhilarating movies you will see this year". Leah Greenblatt of Entertainment Weekly calls it an ode to "the power of music". Anthony Ray Bench of Film Threat calls it "a feel-good movie that tackles a bunch of tough topics, from politics, race, family traditions, social frustrations, and romance" yet "never feels preachy or overly cheesy." Adam Chitwood of Collider calls it "a rapturously joyous, heartfelt, and genuinely insightful film not just about The Boss, but about the personal nature and power of music."

Owen Gleiberman of Variety calls it "the sort of unguarded drama they used to make in the '80s — a coming-of-age tale of unabashed earnestness — but it's also a delirious and romantic rock 'n' roll parable" that is "a more incandescent ode to the life force of pop music than any film ever adapted from the work of Nick Hornby." Bedatri Datta Choudhury of Vague Visages says that, while "Springsteen takes the American dream and helps everyone navigate through its dismantling," Chadha "makes it speak to an entirely different country and a whole new generation."

=== Accolades ===
At the 2019 SIFF Awards in the Seattle International Film Festival, Blinded by the Light received nominations for Best Film (for director Gurinder Chadha) and Best Actor (for Viveik Kalra). In July 2019, Ethan Anderson of /Film listed Blinded by the Light as the eighth best film of 2019 so far. A critics' survey by IndieWire listed Blinded by the Light as one of the eight best films of Summer 2019.
