= Approaching the Unknown =

- Theatrical release poster
- Directed by: Mark Elijah Rosenberg
- Written by: Mark Elijah Rosenberg
- Produced by: Josh Penn; Matthew Parker; Thomas B. Fore; Jason Michael Berman; Mark Roberts; P. Jennifer Dana
- Starring: Mark Strong; Luke Wilson; Sanaa Lathan
- Cinematography: Adam Newport-Berra
- Edited by: David Barker; Darrin Navarro; Matt Rundell; Marc Vives
- Music by: Paul Damian Hogan
- Production companies: Department of Motion Pictures; Loveless; Hinkson Entertainment
- Distributed by: Vertical Entertainment
- Release date: June 3, 2016 (United States)
- Running time: 90 minutes
- Country: United States
- Language: English
- Budget: $1.3 million
- Box office: $10,232

Approaching the Unknown is a 2016 American science fiction drama film written and directed by Mark Elijah Rosenberg in his feature debut. It stars Mark Strong in the lead role of Captain William Stanaforth, the first person on a lone mission to Mars. Luke Wilson and Sanaa Lathan are also featured in supporting roles. It was released on June 3, 2016, by Vertical Entertainment theatrically in the United States and later by Paramount Home Media Distribution on home media and video on demand.

== Plot ==
Captain William Stanaforth is on a one-way solo mission to Mars, taking humanity's first steps towards colonizing it. Although the entire world is watching him, he is completely alone on the space ship. After liftoff and the subsequent rocket separations, Stanaforth takes his suit off to relax and is set on course to Mars for 270 days by the team on the ground.

Through flashbacks we see how Stanaforth had come up with the idea to create water (H_{2}O) by supercompressing sand/dirt and combining the separate hydrogen and oxygen byproducts. It is by this synthesis that the mission is made possible.

Stanaforth's water generation apparatus malfunctions during his mission to Mars. Rather than return to Earth as protocol requires, he takes manual control of his spacecraft and continues to Mars. His spacecraft becomes entangled with a nebula and through voiceover we hear Stanaforth ruminate on the nature of matter and space. Stanaforth says, "This is why I came here. To give everything up. For one moment of pure wonder." Stanaforth is then seen in his spacesuit, exiting the spacecraft.

Without explanation, the scene cuts to Stanaforth, clean-shaven in his spacecraft, preparing to land on Mars. Stanaforth lands on, then walks, on Mars. As he walks, we hear Stanaforth say, "Nothing has ever lived here. Nothing has even died here. Maybe I'll live forever."

== Cast ==
- Mark Strong as Captain William D. Stanaforth, the astronaut venturing to Mars.
- Luke Wilson as Louis Skinner (Skinny)
- Sanaa Lathan as Captain Emily Maddox
- Charles Baker as Captain Frank Worsely
- Anders Danielsen Lie as Greenstreet

== Release ==
In April 2016, Vertical Entertainment acquired U.S. distribution rights to the film, while Paramount Home Media Distribution acquired U.S. home media distribution and video on demand rights as well as worldwide distribution rights outside Japan, Korea, Taiwan, the Middle East and South Africa. The film was released on June 3, 2016.

== Reception ==
The film has received mixed reviews from critics. It has a critic approval rating of 43% on the review aggregator Rotten Tomatoes with an average rating of 5/10 based on 21 reviews. It also has a score of 53 out of 100 on Metacritic, based on 13 critics, indicating "mixed or average" reviews.

Despite its mixed reactions, Strong's performance was praised, with Ben Kenigsberg of The New York Times saying: "If Approaching the Unknown isn't entirely satisfying, Mr. Strong reaches high with his portrayal of the unraveling of a man who believes survival is a matter of engineering."
