= Voyagers (film) =

2021 film by Neil Burger

- Theatrical release poster
- Directed by: Neil Burger
- Written by: Neil Burger
- Produced by: Basil Iwanyk; Neil Burger; Brendon Boyea
- Starring: Tye Sheridan; Lily-Rose Depp; Fionn Whitehead; Colin Farrell; Chanté Adams; Isaac Hempstead Wright; Viveik Kalra; Archie Madekwe; Quintessa Swindell
- Cinematography: Enrique Chediak
- Edited by: Naomi Geraghty
- Music by: Trevor Gureckis
- Production companies: AGC Studios; Thunder Road Films; Fibonacci Films; Nota Bene Films; Stillking Films; Freecss Films; Ingenious Media
- Distributed by: Lionsgate (United States; under Summit Entertainment); Universal Pictures Focus Features (Select territories); Sky Cinema (United Kingdom); Vertical Entertainment (Eastern Europe)
- Release dates: April 9, 2021 (United States); September 28, 2021 (United Kingdom)
- Running time: 108 minutes
- Countries: United States; United Kingdom; Czech Republic; Romania
- Language: English
- Budget: $29 million
- Box office: $4.2 million

Voyagers is a 2021 science fiction thriller film written, co-produced and directed by Neil Burger. It stars Tye Sheridan, Lily-Rose Depp, Fionn Whitehead, Colin Farrell, Chanté Adams, Isaac Hempstead Wright, Viveik Kalra, Archie Renaux, Archie Madekwe, and Quintessa Swindell in their film debut, and follows a group of teenage astronauts sent on a multi-generational mission in the year 2063 to colonize a habitable exoplanet amidst runaway climate change and declining habitability on Earth, who descend into paranoia and social conflict after discovering that their personalities and emotions were being artificially suppressed. The film was theatrically released on April 9, 2021, by Lionsgate and was a box office bomb, grossing US$4.2 million against a $29 million production budget.

== Plot ==
In 2063, astrophysicists on a climate change–ravaged Earth find a habitable planet. A scouting mission is sent, although the roughly 86-year flight means that only some of the original crew, expanded with their children and grandchildren, will reach the planet. The 30-person launch crew are bred on Earth through in vitro fertilisation (IVF) using genius donors, and live their infancy and childhood in isolation in order to help cope with spending their remaining lives mostly in flight. To shorten the wait for news back to Earth, the 30 are launched as preadolescents on the spaceship Humanitas; they are joined by adult program commander Richard, to guide them through the journey's early stage. The plan is for IVF to be performed when the crew turns 24, to be repeated on those offspring when they turn 24.

During the tenth year of the flight, Christopher and Zac discover a chemical is added to everyone's food that suppresses the sex drive and pleasure response, keeping them docile and manageable. The pair stop taking the chemical, with their surging hormones driving them to become competitive, careless, and anxious to engage in sexual relations. Their crewmate Sela, who has trained as chief medical officer, is assaulted by one of the boys, which distresses female members of the crew as well as Richard.

During a repair effort outside the Humanitas to address a failed Earth communication system, Richard is killed and a fire damages more ship systems. Christopher is voted the new chief officer, which upsets Zac, who then tells the others to stop ingesting the chemical. The mission descends into madness as many of the young men and women revert to their most primal state.

A power hungry Zac tells the weak minded others that an alien killed Richard, and he will protect them, letting them eat all the (closely conserved) food they want. He convinces all but five to follow him rather than Christopher. Christopher and Sela, who have become a couple, find and repair a video disk that reveals Zac killed Richard and precipitated the further systems damage by turning on the electricity to the communications array while Richard was working on it. They show the others, but Zac convinces many that an alien is inhabiting one of them, which leads his followers to murder one of their own.

Christopher inadvertently leads Zac to a weapons cache for their grandchildren to use on the planet. Three of the holdouts join Zac's mob, leaving only Christopher, Sela, and Phoebe to oppose Zac. One of Zac's mob kills Phoebe, but Sela kills him in return. She and Christopher eject Zac into space, and his followers acquiesce to living peacefully. Sela is voted chief officer. The crew permanently forgoes the suppression chemical and learn to manage their emotions. They fall in love and have children naturally rather than via the planned IVF.

After another 76 years, Humanitas and its multi-generational crew arrive at the planet, which appears from orbit to be as Earth-like as hoped.

== Cast ==
- Tye Sheridan as Christopher
- Lily-Rose Depp as Sela
- Fionn Whitehead as Zac
- Colin Farrell as Richard
- Chanté Adams as Phoebe
- Viveik Kalra as Peter
- Archie Madekwe as Kai
- Quintessa Swindell as Julie
- Isaac Hempstead Wright as Edward
- Madison Hu as Anda
- Archie Renaux as Alex
- Wern Lee as Tayo
- Veronica Falcón as Marianne Sancar
- Laura Dreyfuss as an IVF technician
- April Grace as Mission Director

== Production ==
The project was announced in January 2019, with Neil Burger serving as the writer and director of the film.

In April 2019, Colin Farrell, Tye Sheridan, Lily-Rose Depp, and Fionn Whitehead were cast as the film's main characters with filming due to begin in Romania in June. That June, Viveik Kalra, Quintessa Swindell, Archie Madekwe, and Archie Renaux joined the cast as supporting characters, with Lionsgate acquiring the U.S. distribution rights.

Principal photography was to begin in Romania on 17 June 2019.

== Release ==
=== Theatrical ===
Voyagers was originally scheduled to be released on November 25, 2020, but its schedule was significantly delayed due to the fallout of the COVID-19 pandemic, which negatively impacted the production of a substantial number of films. It was subsequently rescheduled to be released on April 9, 2021.

=== Home media ===
Voyagers was released on DVD, Blu-ray and Ultra HD Blu-ray on June 15, 2021 by Lionsgate Home Entertainment.

== Reception ==
=== Box office ===
In United States and Canada, Voyagers was released in 1,972 theatres, earning $500,000 on its first day and $1.4 million over its opening weekend, finishing fifth at the box office. The film dropped by over 43.5%, to $779,317, in its second weekend, finishing sixth.

=== Critical response ===
On the review aggregator website Rotten Tomatoes, 24% of 143 critics' reviews are positive, with an average rating of 4.9/10. The website's consensus reads: "It has a game cast and a premise ripe with potential, but Voyagers drifts in familiar orbit instead of fully exploring its intriguing themes." Metacritic, which uses a weighted average, assigned the film a score of 44 out of 100, based on 35 critics, indicating "mixed or average" reviews.

Writing for The Times, Kevin Maher called it "Lord of the Flies meets Sex Education in space", but that "nothing at any point in this criminally undernourished sci-fi lives up to the potential of its premise."
