= Mister (2027 film) =

- Directed by: Wade Eastwood
- Written by: Nicki Cortese; Nick Inglis
- Produced by: Wayne Marc Godfrey; Nicki Cortese; Basil Iwanyk; Erica Lee; Alexis Garcia; Walton Goggins
- Starring: Walton Goggins; Chloë Grace Moretz
- Cinematography: Henry Braham
- Production companies: Bright White Light; Thunder Road Films; Cat 5
- Distributed by: Row K Entertainment
- Release date: 2027
- Country: United States
- Language: English

Mister is an upcoming American action comedy film directed by stunt performer Wade Eastwood, and written by Nicki Cortese and Nick Inglis. It stars Walton Goggins and Chloë Grace Moretz.

The film is scheduled to be released in the United States in 2027.

== Cast ==
- Walton Goggins
- Chloë Grace Moretz
- Katherine LaNasa
- Pom Klementieff
- Matthias Schweighöfer
- Micheál Neeson

== Production ==
In May 2025, it was reported that stunt performer Wade Eastwood would be making his feature film directorial debut on an action comedy film, to be written by Nicki Cortese and Nick Inglis with Cortese also producing. In September, Josh Brolin was cast in the lead role. In February 2026, Brolin had exited the project due to scheduling conflicts, with Walton Goggins replacing him, and Chloë Grace Moretz also joining the cast. On March 17, 2026, Row K Entertainment acquired distribution rights, and principal photography began on the same day in Madrid and the Canary Islands, with Henry Braham serving as the cinematographer.

== Release ==
Mister is scheduled to be released in the United States in 2027.
