= On the Come Up =

2019 young adult novel by Angie Thomas

- First edition cover
- Author: Angie Thomas
- Audio read by: Bahni Turpin
- Cover artist: Anjola Coker (art); Jenna Stempel-Lobell (lettering)
- Language: English
- Publisher: Balzer + Bray
- Publication date: February 5, 2019
- Publication place: United States
- Media type: Print (hardcover)
- Pages: 464
- ISBN: 978-0-06-249856-4
- Dewey Decimal: [Fic]
- LC Class: PZ7.1.T448 On 2019b

On the Come Up, published on February 5, 2019, by Balzer + Bray, is a young adult novel by Angie Thomas. It tells the story of Bri, a sixteen-year old rapper hoping to fill the shoes of her father and "make it" as an underground hip-hop legend. Overnight, Bri becomes an internet sensation after posting a rap hit which sparks controversy. As Bri defeats the odds to achieve success, she battles controversy to reach her dreams. It is set in the same universe (Garden Heights) as Thomas' first book The Hate U Give.

== Main characters ==
- Brianna Jackson—Brianna is the daughter of Jay and Lawless and younger sister to Trey. She is also called Bri or 'Lil Law,' after her late father. She is an aspiring rap legend. In her efforts to achieve success as a rapper, her songs sparked controversy in her community. At school, she has a reputation amongst the teachers as a hoodlum for her "aggressive" behavior.
- Jayda "Jay" Jackson—Brianna and Trey's caring mother. After the murder of her husband, she turned to drugs and suffered from depression but later stopped for fear of losing her kids. She later loses her job and struggles to find other options but always puts her kids first.
- Lawrence "Lawless" Jackson—Brianna and Trey's father, Jay's husband. He was an underground rap legend but was murdered before he was able to "make it big" mainstream as a rapper.
- Trey Jackson—Brianna's older brother, Jay and Lawless's son. He is accomplished, as he received a scholarship and later achieved a degree in college. He worked at a pizza place to make ends meet for Jay and Brianna.
- Aunt Pooh—the aunt to Brianna and Trey, as well as the younger sister to Jay. Aunt Pooh is notoriously known as a drug dealer but maintains a close relationship with Brianna.
- Sonny—loyal, and old friend to Brianna. He supports her regardless, even through the controversy Brianna has suffered.
- Malik—Brianna's crush, and also a close friend. He is loyal to Brianna, but later dates another girl.

== Secondary characters ==
- Kayla—Trey's girlfriend. She works at the pizza place with him, and is known as a rapping queen as well.
- Curtis—Brianna's boyfriend. He's sweet and respects Bri.
- Milez—the son of Supreme. Sonny's crush. Has his own following as a second-rate rapper. Lives in the suburbs instead of the projects.
- Supreme—Supreme was Lawless's old advisor. He later convinces Brianna to take him on.
- Grandma and Granddaddy—the paternal grandparents of Brianna, who took care of her and Trey when Jay was recovering from addiction.
- Jojo—young follower of Brianna, hopes to be a rapper.
- Scrap—Aunt Pooh's friend.
- Shana—Malik's girlfriend.
- Lena—Aunt Pooh's girlfriend.

== Reception ==
On the Come Up was well received by critics, including starred reviews from Booklist and Kirkus Reviews.

Kirkus noted that "a joyous experience awaits" potential readers and urged them to "Read it. Learn it. Love it." Booklist said it was "just as explosive" as Thomas's debut novel, The Hate U Give, noting that she "gives readers another dynamic protagonist to root for."

It also received positive reviews from The New York Times, Vox, and The Washington Post.

== Awards and honors ==
On the Come Up was a New York Times bestseller. The Horn Book Magazine and Kirkus Reviews named it one of the best young adult novels of 2019. Booklist included it on their 2019 "Top 10 Arts Books for Youth" list.

Both the book and audiobook editions of On the Come Up are Junior Library Guild selections.

Awards for On the Come Up
Year	Award	Result	Ref.
2019	Booklist Editors' Choice: Books for Youth	Selection	
2019	Boston Globe-Horn Book Award for Fiction & Poetry	Finalist	
2019	Cybils Award for Young Adult Fiction	Finalist	
2019	Goodreads Choice Award for Young Adult Fiction	Nominee	
2019	Kirkus Prize for Young Readers' Literature	Finalist	
2020	Amazing Audiobooks for Young Adults	Top 10	
2020	Amelia Bloomer Book List	Selection	
2020	Audie Award for Young Adult Title	Finalist	
2020	ALA Best Fiction for Young Adults	Top 10	
2020	Carnegie Medal for Young Adult Fiction	Shortlist	

== Film adaptation ==
On February 4, 2019, Fox 2000 Pictures acquired the rights to adapt the novel with George Tillman Jr. directing and producing with Robert Teitel, and Jay Marcus from State Street Pictures, alongside Thomas Marty Bowen, Isaac Klausner and John Fischer of Temple Hill Entertainment. On December 11, 2019, after Disney's acquisition of 21st Century Fox and closing of Fox 2000, Paramount Players acquired the film adaptation with Kay Oyegun hired to write the script and Tillman Jr. still attached to direct. On October 19, 2020, Wanuri Kahiu replaced Tillman Jr. as director of the film. On June 10, 2021, it was announced that Sanaa Lathan would make her directorial debut with the film, replacing Kahiu.

The film premiered at the 2022 Toronto International Film Festival. It was released on September 23, 2022, both in limited theaters and on the streaming service Paramount+.
