= Daniel Dubiecki =

American film producer

Daniel Dubiecki is an American film producer. He was nominated for the Academy Award for Best Picture for the 2009 film Up in the Air at the 82nd Academy Awards in 2010. On February 7, 2012, Dubiecki launched his own film production company The Allegiance Theater, and the company's first produced film was the 2016 Money Monster.

== Filmography ==
- Waiting for Mo (1996) (line producer)
- Second to Die (2002) (line producer)
- Hotel Lobby (2003)
- Thank You for Smoking (2005) (co-producer)
- Juno (2007) (executive producer)
- Up in the Air (2009)
- Jennifer's Body (2009)
- Chloe (2009) (executive producer)
- Ceremony (2010) (executive producer)
- All Together Now (2013) (executive producer)
- Money Monster (2016)
- Cries from Syria (2017)
- Please Stand By (2018)
- Three Months (2022)
