= Charlie Harper (film) =

- Theatrical release poster
- Directed by: Mac Eldridge; Tom Dean
- Written by: Tom Dean
- Produced by: Wyck Godfrey; Isaac Klausner; Pavan Sitlani; Raj Singh; Christopher Woodrow; Laura Quicksilver; Patrick Wachsberger; Ashley Stern; Mallory Edens
- Starring: Emilia Jones; Nick Robinson
- Cinematography: Sharone Meir
- Edited by: Sam Levy
- Music by: Paul Leonard-Morgan
- Production companies: Picture Perfect Federation; Little Ray Media; Temple Hill Entertainment
- Distributed by: Row K Entertainment
- Release dates: September 4, 2025 (TIFF); September 25, 2026 (United States)
- Running time: 102 minutes
- Country: United States
- Language: English
- Box office: $274,666

Charlie Harper is a 2025 American romance film directed by Mac Eldridge and Tom Dean, and written by Dean. It stars Emilia Jones and Nick Robinson.

Charlie Harper premiered at the Toronto International Film Festival on September 4, 2025, and it was released on September 25, 2026.

== Premise ==
The film chronicles a young woman, Harper, and a young man, Charlie, who after meeting leave their lives behind and attempt to build a life together in a new city. As Harper works to build a career as a chef, and Charlie struggles to get himself on track, their relationship faces growing challenges.

== Cast ==
- Emilia Jones as Harper
- Nick Robinson as Charlie
- Nicholas Cirillo as Kevin
- Virginia Tucker as Jessica
- Sebastian Delascasas as David
- Ja’Quan Henderson as Brian

== Production ==
In May 2023, it was reported that Emilia Jones would star in Charlie Harper for Temple Hill Entertainment and producer Patrick Wachsberger. Toby Wallace was initially in talks to star opposite Jones. By September 2025, it was reported Nick Robinson had been cast as the lead opposite Jones.

== Release ==
Charlie Harper premiered at the Toronto International Film Festival on September 4, 2025. That same month, it was reported that Row K Entertainment had acquired U.S. distribution rights. The film was released on September 25, 2026.

== Reception ==
On the review aggregator website Rotten Tomatoes, 59% of 32 critics' reviews are positive, with an average rating of 5.6/10. Metacritic, which uses a weighted average, assigned the film a score of 51 out of 100, based on nine critics, indicating "mixed or average" reviews.

Mikkel Frederiksen of Film Threat gave the film a score of 8 out 10 and wrote, "Charlie Harper draws easy comparisons to 500 Days of Summer and La La Land with its depiction of imagined lives and the influence our partners have on our personal journey of self-discovery, but Dean and Eldridge offer those same themes in a more earthbound package that'll likely strike a chord with a lot of people." In a mixed review, Guy Lodge of Variety wrote, "Likelier to be found by audiences on VOD, it zigzags with some grace between the peaks and troughs of the romance at its center, but never gathers much momentum or even much depth of emotion; we surmise well before the end that our lovers probably aren't meant to be, and for that we may feel some wistful, knowing sadness. But our hearts don't break for them." Christian Zilko of IndieWire gave the film a B−, writing, "The lack of originality and occasional on-the-nose dialogue cancel out most of its rewatch value, but it's hard not to be affected in the moment by the sincerity of its storytelling and the chemistry between Robinson and Jones."
