= List of Alien vs. Predator characters =

This article is a list of characters from the Alien vs. Predator franchise spanning numerous comic books and video games, and two films: Alien vs. Predator (2004) and Aliens vs. Predator: Requiem (2007), bringing together the fictional storylines and creatures of the Alien and Predator science fiction franchises.

Lance Henriksen was the only previous actor from either the Alien or Predator films to appear in the crossover franchise. Henriksen had portrayed the android Bishop in Aliens (1986) and a man claiming to be the android's creator in Alien 3 (1992). He returned to the franchise for the film Alien vs. Predator (2004) to portray billionaire and self-taught engineer Charles Bishop Weyland, the original founder and CEO of Weyland Industries (also known as Weyland Corporation), and the video game Aliens vs. Predator (2010) to voice future Weyland-Yutani CEO Karl Bishop Weyland. The Predator film The Predator (2018) also connects the franchises, with Breanna Watkins cast as Aliens character Newt Jorden, and Françoise Yip reprising her Requiem role as Cullen Yutani.

== Introduced in comic books ==
Dark Horse Comics published various lines in the franchise starring the character of Machiko Noguchi. The Fire and Stone (2014–2015) and Life and Death (2016–2017) series crosses over the continuities of Alien vs. Predator and Prometheus with graphic novel sequels, following the characters Elden, Francis, Galgo, Angela, and Ahab. Marvel Comics acquired the comic book rights to the Alien vs. Predator franchise in 2020, introducing a new alien hunter named Theta.

== Introduced in Alien vs. Predator (2004) ==
=== Humans ===
==== Alexa "Lex" Woods ====
Alexa "Lex" Woods (portrayed by Sanaa Lathan) is recruited by Maxwell Stafford to be the guide for a team of explorers and scientists that is sent by Weyland Industries to explore a pyramid located under Bouvet Island. During the expedition, she and her team accidentally start a 'coming of age' rite for the Predators ahead of schedule by removing the Predators' plasma cannons, thus leaving them with only melee weapons to use against the Aliens.

However, after most of the humans and Predators are killed, Lex join forces with the sole surviving Predator after Lex kills an Alien that ambushes the two. Lex provides Scar with his plasma cannon while he makes her a makeshift shield and spear out of the remains of the dead Alien in return of her gratitude.

After the last surviving member of the team, Sebastian De Rosa is killed, they set a bomb in the hive to destroy the temple. Alexa and Scar attempt to evacuate, but are once again attacked by Aliens. Lex manages to kill one with Scar's plasma cannon which fell off from his shoulder when an Alien pounced on him. Taking the opportunity, both Alexa and the Predator flee the temple before it is destroyed. After they rise to the surface, Scar subsequently marks her a warrior in recognition of her defeat of two of the Aliens.

Following the attack of the Alien Queen, during which the Queen was tipped into the Southern Ocean, Scar dies. Alexa is confronted by the rest of the Predator clan as they collect Scar's body. Recognizing her mark given by Scar, the commander of the Predator ship (known as Elder) gives her one of their Combi-Sticks as a trophy before departing.

==== Charles Bishop Weyland ====
Charles Bishop Weyland (Lance Henriksen), the Weyland Industries chief executive officer, and his team of archaeologists, scientists, and explorers search an ancient pyramid under the ice of Bouvet Island, believed to be the first pyramid ever built due to its structure, combining elements of all the great ancient civilizations. Terminally ill, Weyland views the discovery of the pyramid as his last chance to make his mark on history.

When the Aliens attack, Weyland refuses to abandon the guns they acquired earlier because he feels that "Too much has been lost to leave with nothing", then, realizing that his illness is slowing them down, chooses to stay behind to try to buy Alexa and Sebastian time to escape. Though Weyland tries to stop the pursuing Predator, Scar refrains from killing him after a scan shows that Weyland is already dying of his illness, making him an unworthy target. When Weyland subsequently uses an improvised flamethrower (made out of his inhaler and a flare) against the Predator after it leaves him lying on the ground, Scar retaliates and kills him.

==== Joe Connors ====
Joe Connors (Joseph Rye) is a mercenary member of the team. Connors falls down a shaft when the pyramid shifts and injures his leg. Connors is taken by the aliens and is later seen cocooned to the wall and already dead from a chestburster.

==== Graeme Miller ====
Graeme Miller (Ewen Bremner) is an engineer and a member of the expedition crew. While the Weyland Industries team is searching the whaling camp, he is startled by a penguin. He befriends Alexa and Sebastian on the helicopter ride to the pyramid. During so, it is revealed that he has two sons. He also seems to be somewhat nervous and anxious most of the time.

When the pyramid shifts, he is trapped in a small room with Verheiden. He tells him that they have to continue if they are to get home to their boys. However, when they are traveling on through the pyramid, it shifts once more, separating the two. Once Verheiden is taken away, he sees an Alien at the end of the room, and is dragged off to the hive. Once there, he awakens to find an egg opening before him and a facehugger ready to leap. Still attached to the wall, he manages to get a hold of Verheiden's gun and shoots the facehugger repeatedly. He then realizes that there are several other eggs opening in response and is outnumbered by the facehuggers while attempting to shoot them.

Miller is later discovered to be dead by Alexa and Scar, his chest having been ripped open.

==== Maxwell Stafford ====
Weyland's right-hand man, Maxwell Stafford (Colin Salmon) was a member of the team sent into the ancient pyramid. He is one of three people to become targets for the predators, after taking one of their ceremonial plasma guns. After the pyramid shifts, he is attacked by Celtic and is trapped under a tightening net. He pleads for Weyland to help him, but it proves futile. He is killed when Celtic subsequently impaled him with his Combi-Stick.

==== Sebastian De Rosa ====
An Italian member of the team of explorers hired by Weyland to explore the pyramid, Sebastian De Rosa (Raoul Bova) serves as the team's archaeologist and linguist, translating the writings on the walls of the pyramid to learn the story of the Predators and their hunts. Sebastian tries in vain to stop Stafford and the other mercenaries from stealing the Predators' weapons.

When the pyramid shifts, he gets trapped with Weyland, Stafford and Alexa. After a Predator attack, he and Alexa are the only ones remaining. After being chased by Scar, the pyramid shifts, just in time for them to escape into another room. There, they watch Scar kill a facehugger and an Alien, then witness him mark himself with its blood. After Sebastian translates the hieroglyphs around them to learn that the Predators have come to Earth as part of a ritual to prove themselves, Alexa and Sebastian conclude that they must return Scar's gun to him.

When the pyramid shifts once more, they are chased by Aliens to a cliff, where Alexa just misses the other side and Sebastian is forced to lift her up. Just then, the Alien "Grid" appears right next to him, and drags him off to the hive. Later, she and Scar find Rosa cocooned in the hive. He pleads for her to kill him, having stated that "it" is already inside of him. She honors his wish, and shoots him in the head. Moments later, his chestburster emerges, but Scar immediately kills it.

==== Adèle Rousseau ====
The second female member of the exploration team, Adèle Rosseau (Agathe de La Boulaye) becomes the first victim of a facehugger and the resulting chestburster, after she is put in charge of studying the sacrificial chamber. After Stafford and his men remove the Predator guns from a sarcophagus in the room below the sacrificial chamber, they unwittingly trigger the pyramid which then shifts and seals Rousseau and the exploration team in the sacrificial chamber. Xenomorph eggs then begin to rise from the slabs, startling everyone and they begin to open when approached, despite being armed with a gun, Rousseau fails to defend herself and the others from the much more agile facehuggers. She awakes to find a dead facehugger next to her and Thomas and one other member of the exploration team with facehuggers still on them. After catching her breath, she takes off her jacket and begins to moan and convulse, spitting up blood as the chestburster rips through her chest.

==== Mark Verheiden ====
One of the mercenaries hired to protect the explorers, Mark Verheiden (Tommy Flanagan), along with Stafford is one of the team members to take one of the Predators' ceremonial guns, thus making him a target of the Predators. When the pyramid shifts, he sees Connors in trouble, but does nothing. Despite him keeping his distance, he gets trapped in a small room with Miller, where it is revealed that he has one child awaiting him at home.

With that encouragement given by Miller, he continues to move through the pyramid. However, immediately afterward, the floor moves out from under him, dropping him down a hole and breaking his legs. As he screams for Miller to get him out, the floor closes back up above him. He then spots an Alien down the hallway, and grabs hold of a machine gun that is covered in slime, shooting at the Alien. However, upon turning around, he sees another Alien right next to him, and is then taken away, He is next seen Facehugged and cocooned in the sacrificial chamber, he grabs Miller's hand when the latter reached for his gun and can be heard futilely trying to shout for help, indicating that he was still conscious which is an unusual circumstance since facehuggers will usually render their host unconscious. The character is named after the writer of the Dark Horse comic book in which the original concept originated.

==== Rusten Quinn ====
Rusten Quinn (Carsten Noorgard) is one of the mercenaries and an experienced driller. Quinn is one for the few characters to put up any sort of fight against the Predator, bravely attempting to defend himself from Celtic, however, he is hopelessly outmatched and winds up injured and falls down the tunnel to the pyramid, though he survives this. Quinn is then killed by Scar when the Predators reach the bottom of tunnel.

==== Stone ====
Stone (Petr Jakl) is one of the mercenaries. While patrolling the pyramid Stone runs into a predator's razor sharp noose, which strangles him and silently drags him up. Stone's gun drops to the floor shortly after, alerting the others.

==== Bass ====
Bass (Pavel Bezdek) is one of the mercenaries. After Stone is killed, Bass looks around, discovering multiple Predator statues. Bass realizes one statue is actually a Predator, which hurls a combi-stick into him, killing him instantly.

==== Sven ====
Sven (Adrian Bouchet) is a Swedish mercenary. Sven remains at the camp, which is attacked by the Predators. Sven is killed when one Predator impales him with its combi-stick.

=== Aliens ===
==== Grid ====
Grid (Tom Woodruff Jr.) is an Alien that gets its name from the grid-like scars on its head, which it got from fighting Celtic and being caught in his net and his tail blade was cut off. Grid is one of the more dangerous and cunning Aliens, successfully killing two Predators: Chopper, distracted when tries to kill Alexa, by sneaking up on it, and Celtic by taking advantage of Celtic's overconfidence. Grid is killed by the explosion of Scar's self-destruct device.

In the Alien vs. Predator (2010) game, there is a "Nethead" skin for the Alien which has the net-induced scars on its head.

=== Predators ===
==== Scar ====
Scar (Ian Whyte) is one of three Predators that has arrived at the Pyramid to enact a once in a hundred-year ritual to become "blooded" hunters. Scar is the only one of the three to achieve blooded status and shows more competency and skill than the other two predators, who both fail to either mind their surroundings and underestimate the Alien threat. However, Scar is caught off guard by a facehugger when he removes his mask to mark it with the acid blood of his recent kill. He succeeds in killing several Aliens and manages to survive the pyramid, and aids Lex in defeating the Queen, but is mortally wounded and dies from his injuries. His body is taken by his clan and later left unattended in a chamber, where his chest then explodes as a chestburster erupts from it.

==== Celtic ====
Celtic (Whyte) is a large predator who seems to be the leader of the three, after seeing Chopper killed by Grid, he engages the Xenomorph in battle, displaying decent combat skills and eventually succeeds in defeating Grid, however due to his hubris and overconfidence, he fails to land the killing blow on Grid before the latter frees itself from the net. Grid then pins and kills Celtic by using its inner jaw to pierce his head.

==== Chopper ====
Chopper (Whyte) is one of the young Predators. Chopper helped slaughter the camp. After discovering the humans had taken the plasmacasters, they split up. Chopper and Celtic caught up with a group of survivors. While preparing to kill Lex, Grid impales him on its tail and headbites him.

== Introduced in Aliens vs. Predator: Requiem (2007) ==
=== Humans ===
==== Dallas Howard ====
Dallas Howard (portrayed by Steven Pasquale), an ex-con and the film's one of the two main protagonists, returns to Gunnison, Colorado, after his time in prison. He is Ricky's older brother, and seemingly good friends with Sheriff Eddie Morales.

When Ricky comes home to find Dallas back from his time in prison, he tells him about Dale having attacked him, and that his car keys are lost in the sewer. He offers to help Ricky get them back, but only after thoroughly arguing. In the sewers, they manage to find the keys, but not before Ricky sees a newborn Alien chestburster swimming through the sewage. They then hear an Alien hissing at the end of the tunnel, and flee.

When the Aliens attack, Dallas, and Morales take the teenagers (along with Darcy) to a radio store, where they find more refugees; namely, two of the store's owners. Dallas sides with Kelly when she offers an alternative escape plan, and leads her, Molly, Ricky, Jesse and Drew, while Morales leads Darcy and several others to the army's promised "evacuation" zone.

After getting through the hospital, losing Jesse and Drew (the two having been killed), and Ricky being impaled, Dallas finds the Predator Wolf's plasma pistol and uses it as his own weapon. The group travels to the helicopter on the rooftop's building, but are attacked by a number of Aliens. Escape seems almost impossible, until Dallas manages to blow a hole through the wall with the pistol, allowing them to leave safely.

When the group finally makes it to the helicopter, Dallas stays behind to buy them time. Using the pistol, he kills several Aliens but is almost overpowered. Just when the helicopter is about to take off, Wolf finds him and attempts to take his pistol back. Wolf then battles the Predalien, allowing Dallas to board the helicopter.

They manage to fly away, but not quite quickly enough; the town's nuclear explosion and fallout creates turbulence, forcing them to crash-land. Dallas awakens, dazed, to find a group of camouflaged troops surrounding them; Dallas finally gives up the gun, in return for medical help for Ricky.

==== Buddy and Sam Benson ====
Buddy (portrayed by Kurt Max Runte) and Sam Benson (portrayed by Liam James) are out hunting when they witness the predator's ship crash. From there, they go to investigate but soon are chased by escaping facehuggers. Sam falls, giving the parasites an advantage; they begin to circle the pair. After a warning by Sam, Buddy manages to kill one (at nearly point-blank range), which results in his arm being melted off by the acid. Another facehugger attacks and succeeds in attaching itself to Buddy's face; with his father being rendered unconscious, Sam is unprotected and is also attacked by a facehugger. The pair are later killed by the chestbursters that erupt from their chest, and their dead bodies are melted by Wolf.

==== Darcy Benson ====
Darcy Benson (portrayed by Chelah Horsdal) is Buddy's wife (and Sam's mother) unaware that her family were killed by Xenomorphs, who becomes involved in the Xenomorph outbreak. She was later killed by the bombing.

==== Harry ====
Harry is one of three homeless people living in the sewers; his dog Butch discovers Buddy's arm that had been melted off. Later, in the sewer, Butch senses the aliens and barks. This prompts one of the homeless men to look into the water, to see what spooked Butch. Just then, a facehugger leaps out of the water and latches on to the homeless man, knocking him out. Then another facehugger tries to attack Harry, yet he manages to grab it in time. However, an Alien warrior appears, scaring and distracting Harry; this causes him to lose grip of the facehugger, which then clamps on to his face.

==== Ricky Howard ====
Dallas Howard's younger brother (portrayed by Johnny Lewis) and Jesse's love interest, Ricky Howard is an enemy of Dale, as Jesse shows interest in him. However, Ricky doesn't seem to hate Dale back. It is revealed that he works as a pizza delivery boy with Drew as his manager.

Ricky's role in the film begins when Drew assigns him a delivery at Jesse's house. When he gets there, he realizes that Dale is also at the house with his two friends, Nick and Mark. They treat Ricky badly while there, but don't bother him physically until he's at his car, ready to leave. The three attack him, steal his keys, and throw them down the storm drain.

Ricky gets home to find Dallas back from jail. Ricky asks Dallas to help get his keys back, and Dallas agrees. While in the sewer, they see the keys at the bottom of a pile of muck and, when they go to retrieve them, they also find an Alien chestburster swimming in the water. Frightened, the two flee the sewers with Ricky's keys.

A while later, Ricky meets up with Jesse at the school's pool. However, Dale and his cronies meet them there; Ricky shoves them into the water, unaware that an Alien is lurking nearby. Jesse spots the Alien and yells for them to get out, but not in time before Dale's friends are killed by the Alien.

Ricky escapes, and travels with his older brother in order to locate a way out of town. They decide to make their way to the hospital, where a helicopter is on the rooftop. However, during an extended mêlée throughout the hospital, Jesse is killed by Wolf, pinned to the wall with a shuriken. Ricky, enraged, attacks the Predator, before Wolf is jumped on by an Alien, causing them to fall down an elevator shaft. The attack makes Wolf drop his plasma gun. Ricky picks up the gun, but then is impaled by the Predalien through the shoulder. After Dallas opens fire on the Predalien, the creature flees. Injured, Ricky manages to get to the helicopter with Dallas, Kelly and Molly before the bomb is detonated.

==== Kelly O'Brien ====
Kelly O'Brien (portrayed by Reiko Aylesworth) comes home, (after serving her time in the U.S. Army) to her estranged daughter, Molly, and her awaiting husband, Tim. During an attack, her husband Tim is mauled and killed by an Alien. She flees with Molly to a local graveyard, where they find a man who is subsequently killed by the Predator. Kelly and Molly later arrive at the sporting goods store, where Dallas and a few others are hiding. Kelly convinces the others to avoid Gilliam Circle (i.e. the center of town) and the airlift because she knows the Army will prioritize containing the Aliens over saving lives. Dallas, Ricky, Molly and Kelly flee from town on the helicopter, after losing Drew and Jesse.

==== Molly O'Brien ====
Molly is Kelly and Tim O'Brien's daughter (portrayed by Ariel Gade). She becomes traumatized by the Aliens and by the fact that her father is killed in the attack. Together with Dallas, Ricky, and Kelly, she flees from town on the helicopter after losing Drew and Jesse.

==== Tim O'Brien ====
Tim O'Brien (portrayed by Sam Trammell) is Molly's father and Kelly's husband. After Kelly's time in the army, it is revealed that he has become Molly's "mother role" after she denies her mother to read her a bed-time story. He is killed when Molly says that she saw a monster outside her bedroom window. When he looks outside, an Alien attacks him. As he holds it off, he tells Kelly to take Molly and run. He is unable to overpower the Alien, and is killed, but nevertheless, he manages to save enough time to allow Kelly and Molly to escape.

==== Colonel Stevens ====
"Colonel Stevens" (portrayed by Robert Joy) identified himself as an officer in the Army to the survivors in Gunnison. He told Sheriff Morales to gather the citizens of Gunnison in the center of town for an airlift, but no airlift was planned; instead, the town was bombed with a tactical nuclear weapon. After eventually receiving Wolf's plasma pistol, he gave it to Ms. Yutani.

==== Sue ====
Sue is a pregnant woman who was impregnated by the Predalien.

==== Jessica "Jesse" Salinger ====
Jessica "Jesse" Salinger (played by Kristen Hager) was Ricky's love interest and Dale's girlfriend (later ex-girlfriend). Jesse arranges to meet Ricky at the school pool after hours. Wishing to seduce him, Jesse strips to her swimsuit that consists of a black bikini top and light blue bikini bottom; she claims to have not known what to wear, initiating a kiss. However, Dale arrives with his posse to harass and harm Ricky in retaliation. The Xenomorph and Predator's fight soon spills into the pool hall, forcing them to flee and pick up allies during the chaos. She is killed when the Predator accidentally pins her upper body to the wall with his shuriken.

==== Dale Collins ====
Dale Collins (portrayed by David Paetkau) is Jesse's ex-boyfriend and an enemy of Ricky. He beats Ricky up and throws his keys into the sewer. He dies when the Predator kills an Alien that falls on top of him, burning his face with its acidic blood.

==== Ms. Yutani ====
Ms. Yutani (portrayed by Françoise Yip) is the head of the Yutani Corporation. She controlled Colonel Stevens and it was he who gave her Wolf's plasma pistol. It is implied that she will develop the beginning of interstellar space technology through this.

==== Nick and Mark ====
Nick (portrayed by Michael Suchanek) and Mark (Matt Ward) are Dale's two friends, and enemies of Ricky. When Ricky is fighting the trio in the pool, an Alien kills Mark with its inner jaw, and as Dale, Jesse, and Ricky escape through the window, the Alien pulls Nick back through the window and kills him as well (shortly before being killed in turn by a Predator).

==== Sheriff Eddie Morales ====
Edward "Eddie" Morales (portrayed by John Ortiz) was the town's Sheriff. He greets Dallas when he returns to Gunnison, but also shows a slight contempt towards him, at times. Eddie receives a call for help from Dallas during the alien invasion, but does not believe him until an alien breaks into his house and kills his wife. He later joins a group of survivors, waiting for a rescue. He dies when a nuclear bomb is dropped on the town, and is killed along with the survivors, the Predator, the Aliens, and the Predalien.

=== Aliens ===
==== Predalien ====
The Predalien is the result of a facehugger impregnating a Predator. One erupted from Scar at the end of the first film and was later killed at the end by the explosion.

=== Predators ===
==== Wolf ====
Wolf is a Predator who was an accomplished Xenomorph hunter and elite ranked Yautja. At some point, he was scarred by a Xenomorph's acidic blood, burning the left side of his face and losing him his upper left mandible.

==== Bull ====
Bull was a Predator aboard the Scout Ship which had detached from the Mother Ship departing Earth in 2004, after recovering the body of Scar when he was killed by a Xenomorph Queen on Bouvet Island.

==== Bonegrill ====
Bonegrill is a Predator, who was presumably one of the two Predators flayed by the Predalien.

== See also ==
- List of Alien characters
- List of Predator characters
