= Three Months =

2022 American film by Jared Frieder

- Release poster
- Directed by: Jared Frieder
- Written by: Jared Frieder
- Produced by: Lara Alameddine; Daniel Dubiecki; Alexander Motlagh
- Starring: Troye Sivan; Viveik Kalra; Brianne Tju; Javier Muñoz; Judy Greer; Amy Landecker; Louis Gossett Jr.; Ellen Burstyn
- Cinematography: Chananun Chotrungroj
- Edited by: Robert Hoffman
- Music by: Roger Neill
- Production companies: MTV Entertainment Studios; The Allegiance Theater
- Distributed by: Paramount+
- Release date: February 23, 2022
- Running time: 104 minutes
- Country: United States
- Language: English

Three Months is a 2022 American comedy-drama film written and directed by Jared Frieder, and starring Troye Sivan, Viveik Kalra, Brianne Tju, Javier Muñoz, Judy Greer, Amy Landecker, Louis Gossett Jr. and Ellen Burstyn. It was released on Paramount+ on February 23, 2022.

== Plot ==
On the eve of his high school graduation, Caleb Kahn, a South Florida boy realizes he has been exposed to HIV. While he waits three months for the definitive tests on his status, he finds love in the most unlikely of places, and gets help from many new friends.

== Cast ==
- Troye Sivan as Caleb
- Viveik Kalra as Estha
- Brianne Tju as Dara
- Javier Muñoz as Dr. Diaz
- Judy Greer as Suzanne
- Amy Landecker as Edith
- Louis Gossett Jr. as Benny
- Ellen Burstyn as Valerie

== Reception ==
Curtis M. Wong from HuffPost said "As a coming-of-age comedy-drama, Three Months is heartfelt and forward-thinking, probing the challenges young LGBTQ people face in a thoughtfully humorous way. Sivan gives the film a boost of star power but otherwise leaves all traces of his pop artist persona behind, capturing Caleb's self-effacing wit and relatable insecurities with refreshing nuance."

The film was a New York Times Critic's Pick and nominated for the 2022 Humanitas Prize. On review aggregator Rotten Tomatoes, the film has an approval rating of 79% based on 14 reviews, with an average rating of 6.10/10.

Sivan was nominated for the Most Popular Australian Actor or Actress in an International Program at the 2022 Logie Awards for his work on the film. The film was also nominated for the Critics' Choice Award for Best Movie Made for Television at the 28th Critics' Choice Awards. The film was nominated for the GLAAD Media Award for Outstanding Film – Streaming or TV.
