= Sanaa Lathan =

American actress (born 1971)

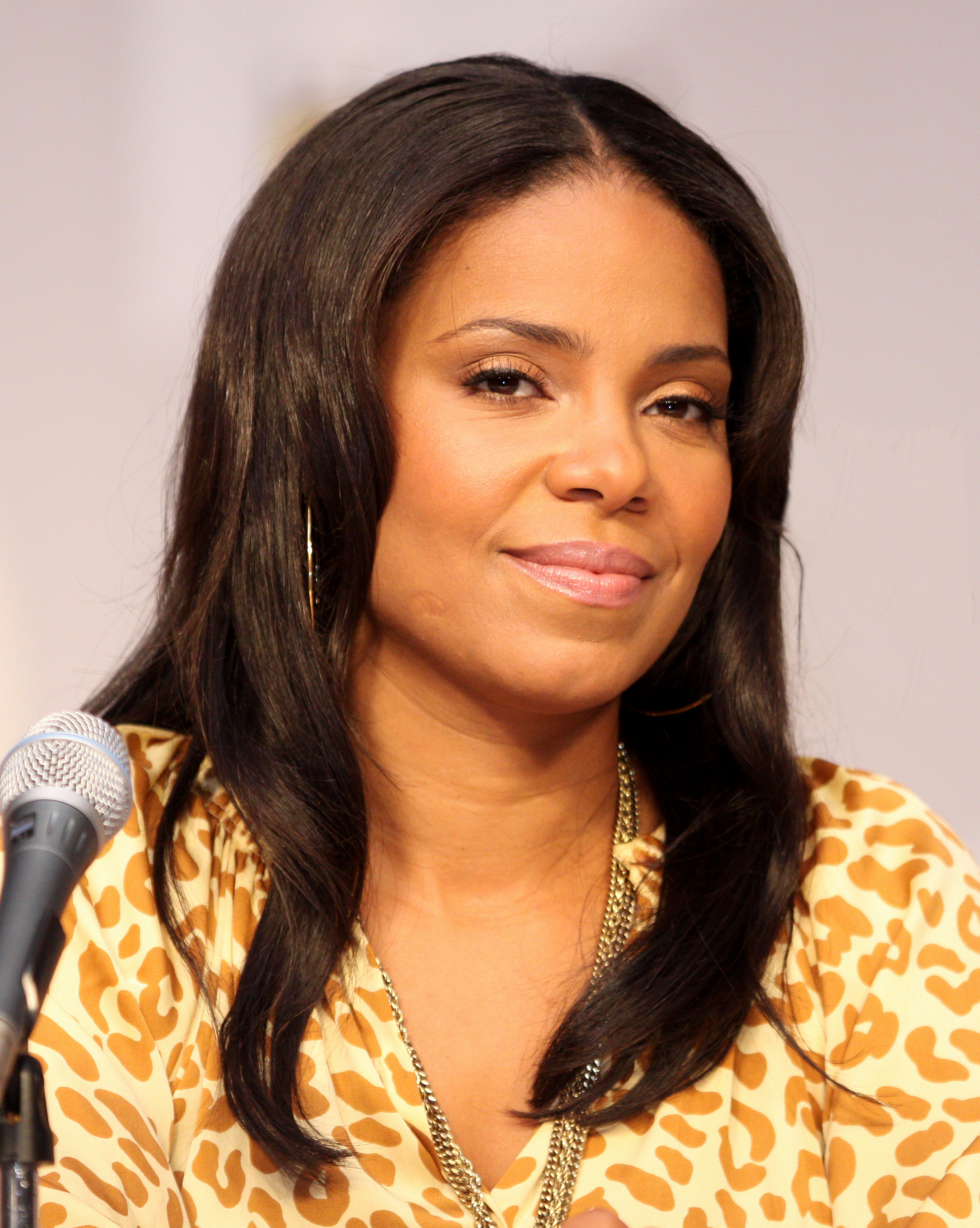
- Lathan at the 2010 San Diego Comic-Con
- Born: Sanaa McCoy Lathan; September 19, 1971 (age 54); New York City, New York
- Education: University of California, Berkeley (BA); Yale University (MFA)
- Occupation: Actress
- Years active: 1996–present
- Father: Stan Lathan

Sanaa McCoy Lathan (/səˈnɑː ˈleɪθən/; born September 19, 1971) is an American actress. She is the daughter of actress Eleanor McCoy and film director Stan Lathan. Her career began after she appeared in the shows In the House, Family Matters, NYPD Blue, and Moesha. Lathan later garnered further prominence after starring in the 1998 superhero film Blade, which followed with film roles in The Best Man (1999), Love & Basketball (2000), Disappearing Acts (2000), and Brown Sugar (2002).

In 2004, Lathan's performance in the Broadway revival of A Raisin in the Sun earned her a nomination at the Tony Awards for Best Featured Actress in a Play. Following this, she played the role of Alexa "Lex" Woods in the film Alien vs. Predator. In 2008, she landed a leading role in the film The Family That Preys by Tyler Perry. Lathan returned to theatre work in 2010, starring in the all-black performance of Cat on a Hot Tin Roof at the Novello Theatre in London. She reprised her role as Robyn in the Christmas-themed sequel of The Best Man, in The Best Man Holiday (2013). In 2022, she received a nomination for the Primetime Emmy Award for Outstanding Guest Actress in a Drama Series, for her work on the television series Succession.

As a voice actress, from (2009 to 2013), she voiced Donna Tubbs in The Cleveland Show and in all concurrent and subsequent Family Guy appearances, as well as Catwoman on Harley Quinn. Her other notable film credits include Out of Time (2003), Something New (2006), Wonderful World (2009), Contagion (2011), Repentance (2013), The Perfect Guy (2015), and Now You See Me 2 (2016). Lathan also made her directorial debut with the film On the Come Up in 2022.

== Early life ==
Lathan, who is of African American heritage, was born in New York City. Her mother, Eleanor McCoy, was also an actress and dancer.

Lathan's adolescence was a tough period. She has stated she was a latchkey kid whose parents weren't around much. As a result, she was left with relatives who abused drugs. However, she went on to develop a solid relationship with her parents in the ensuing years.

She graduated from the University of California, Berkeley, with a bachelor's degree in English. She then attended Yale University and earned a master's degree in drama.

== Career ==
Following her training at Yale, where she studied with Earle R. Gister and performed in a number of Shakespeare plays, Lathan earned acclaim both off-Broadway and on the Los Angeles stage. Encouraged by her father to make Los Angeles her professional base, she found early television roles in episodes of such shows as In the House, Family Matters, NYPD Blue, and Moesha.

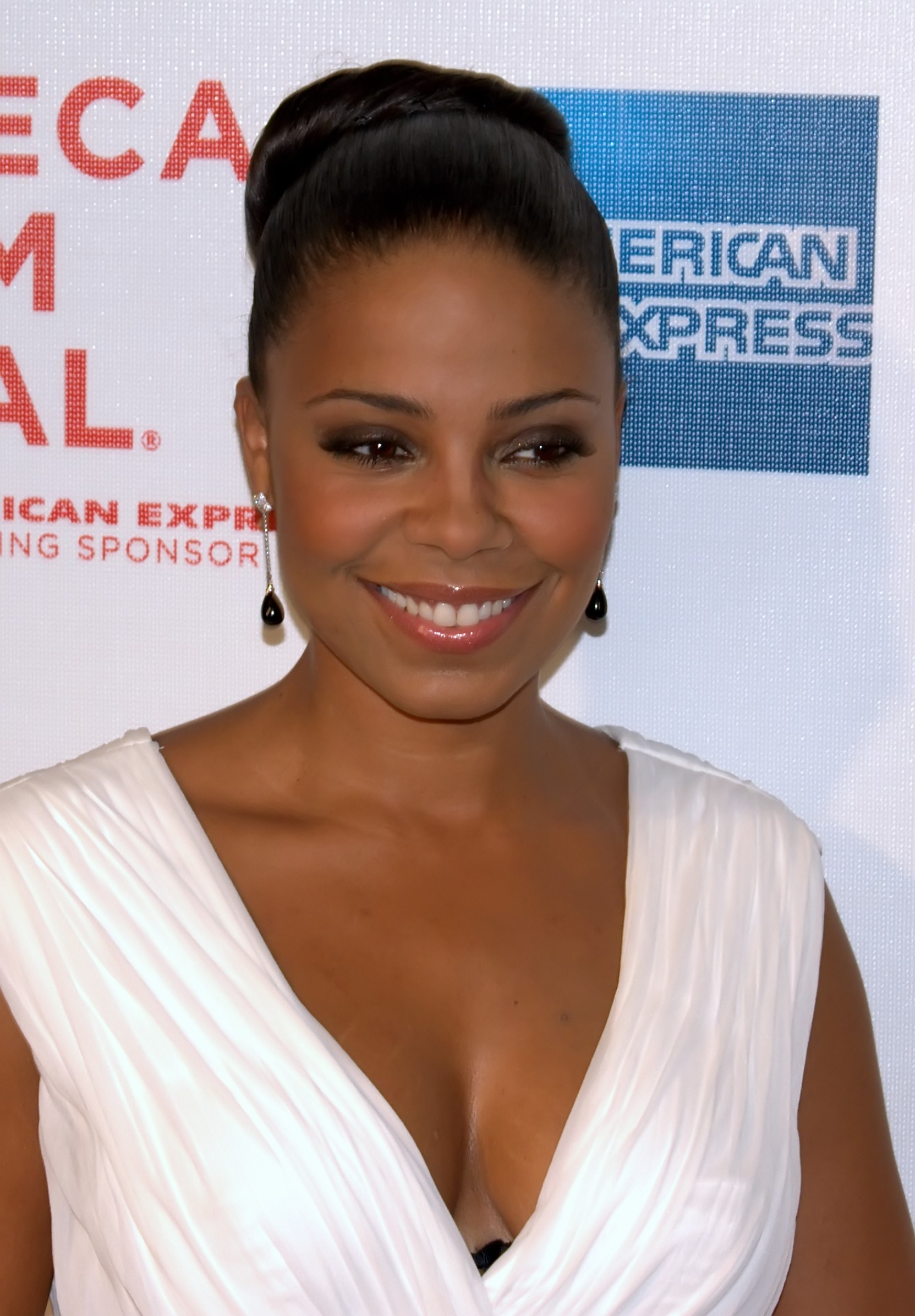
Lathan at the 2009 Tribeca Film Festival premiere of Wonderful World

In 1998, Lathan earned a degree of recognition with her role as the mother of Wesley Snipes's title character in Blade. The following year she appeared in Life with Martin Lawrence and Eddie Murphy and did back-to-back turns in The Best Man and The Wood. The Best Man, a comedy-drama ensemble film starring Taye Diggs, Nia Long, Harold Perrineau Jr. and Morris Chestnut, was one of the top ten highest-grossing African American films in history, and Lathan received an NAACP Image Award nomination for her performance. The Wood, another ensemble film starring Diggs and Omar Epps, cast her as Epps's love interest.

Lathan and Epps were reunited onscreen in Gina Prince-Bythewood's Love & Basketball, this time as a couple as passionate about basketball as they are about each other. Her performance earned Lathan the 2001 NAACP Image Award for Outstanding Actress in a Motion Picture, an Independent Spirit Award nomination for Best Actress, and a BET Award. In 2000, she appeared in the Off-Broadway production of The Vagina Monologues with Teri Garr and Julianna Margulies.

In 2001, Lathan earned acclaim for her work in the multicultural comedy film Catfish in Black Bean Sauce. Next was her second collaboration with Prince-Bythewood, Disappearing Acts, based on a novel by Terry McMillan. In the HBO film, she played an aspiring singer/songwriter in love with a carpenter, played by her Blade co-star Wesley Snipes. For her work in the film, she earned an Essence Award for Best Actress. That year, she was named by Ebony magazine as one of its 55 Most Beautiful People and was honoured by Essence magazine and Black Entertainment Television. In 2002, Lathan starred in the romantic comedy film, Brown Sugar with Diggs, Queen Latifah and Mos Def. Lathan's performance earned an NAACP Image Award Nomination for Outstanding Actress in a Motion Picture. The film also received an NAACP Image Award nomination for Outstanding Motion Picture. In 2003 she co-starred with Denzel Washington in Out of Time.

In 2004, Lathan starred on Broadway in A Raisin in the Sun with Sean Combs, Audra McDonald, and Phylicia Rashad, and received a Tony Award nomination for Best Performance by a Featured Actress for her portrayal of Beneatha Younger. She reprised the role in ABC Network's 2008 film adaptation.

The same year, she was given the lead role in Alien vs. Predator. It was a major success, grossing over $171 million worldwide.

In 2006, she co-starred with Simon Baker in the romantic comedy Something New, and as Michelle Landau, the much younger wife of a Texas businessman (Larry Hagman) in the fourth season of the television series Nip/Tuck. She played Andrea in Tyler Perry's The Family That Preys, also starring Alfre Woodard and Kathy Bates, released in the U.S. on September 12, 2008.

In 2009, Lathan co-starred with Matthew Broderick in the drama Wonderful World. From 2009, she voiced the character Donna Tubbs on The Cleveland Show, and later Family Guy, following the former's cancellation. In 2011, Lathan co-starred in the Steven Soderbergh thriller Contagion with Matt Damon, Jude Law, Marion Cotillard, Kate Winslet, Gwyneth Paltrow, Bryan Cranston, and Laurence Fishburne. In 2011, she starred with Anthony Mackie and Forest Whitaker in Repentance, a psychological thriller directed by Phillipe Caland. She played series regular Mona Fredricks in the second season of Starz' original series Boss, starring Kelsey Grammer.

In 2013, Lathan reprised her role in The Best Man′s sequel, The Best Man Holiday. In 2016, she was cast in the ensemble of the sequel of Now You See Me, entitled Now You See Me 2, which was a box-office success; and in the science fiction film Approaching the Unknown. In 2017, she returned to TV in a lead role in the series Shots Fired, and also appeared in the film American Assassin. She was then added to the main cast of The Affair, appearing in its fourth and fifth seasons, and starred in the Netflix film Nappily Ever After.

In January 2021, it was announced that she was cast in season 3 of Succession as a Lisa Arthur, a high profile, well-connected New York lawyer earning her a nomination for the Primetime Emmy Award for Outstanding Guest Actress in a Drama Series.

In 2021, Lathan directed the film adaptation of Angie Thomas's novel On the Come Up. The film premiered at the 2022 Toronto International Film Festival.

== Filmography ==
=== Film ===
Year	Title	Role	Notes
1997	Drive	Carolyn Brody	
1998	Blade	Vanessa Brooks	
1999	Life	Daisy	
1999	Catfish in Black Bean Sauce	Nina	
1999	The Wood	Alicia	
1999	The Best Man	Robyn	
2000	Love & Basketball	Monica Wright	
2000	The Smoker	Roxanne	Short
2002	Brown Sugar	Sidney "Sid" Shaw	
2003	Out of Time	Ann Merai Harrison	
2004	Alien vs. Predator	Alexa "Lex" Woods	
2005	The Golden Blaze	Monica (voice)	Video
2006	Something New	Kenya Denise McQueen	
2008	The Family That Preys	Andrea Evans-Bennett	
2009	Wonderful World	Khadi	
2009	Powder Blue	Diana	
2011	Contagion	Aubrey Cheever	
2013	Repentance	Maggie Carter	
2013	The Best Man Holiday	Robyn Stewart	
2015	The Perfect Guy	Leah Vaughn	Also executive producer
2016	Now You See Me 2	FBI Deputy Director Natalie Austin	
2016	Approaching the Unknown	Emily Maddox	
2017	American Assassin	CIA Deputy Director Irene Kennedy	
2018	Nappily Ever After	Violet Jones	Also producer
2019	Native Son	Trudy Thomas	
2021	With/In: Volume 1	Beth	Segment: "Leap"; also director
2022	On The Come Up	Jayda "Jay" Jackson	Also director
2023	Young. Wild. Free.	Janice Huffman	Also executive producer
2024	The Supremes at Earl's All-You-Can-Eat	Barbara Jean	

=== Television ===
Year	Title	Role	Notes
1996	In the House	Charese	Episode: "The Curse of Hill House"
1996	Moesha	Ebony	Episode: "A Concerted Effort"
1997	Family Matters	Allison	Episode: "Revenge of the Nerd"
1997	Built to Last	Linda	Episode: "Pilot"
1997	Miracle in the Woods	Young Lilly	Television film
1998	NYPD Blue	Shirley Barish	Episode: "You're Under a Rasta"
1998–1999	LateLine	Briana Gilliam	Main cast
2000	Disappearing Acts	Zora Banks	Television film
2006	Nip/Tuck	Michelle Landau	Recurring cast (season 4)
2008	A Raisin in the Sun	Beneatha Younger	Television film
2009–2013	The Cleveland Show	Donna Tubbs (voice)	Main cast
2010–present	Family Guy	Donna Tubbs (voice)	Recurring cast (season 8–)
2011	Tilda	Sasha Litt	Television film
2012	Boss	Mona Fredricks	Main cast (season 2)
2014	Real Husbands of Hollywood	Herself	Episode: "Rolling with My Roomie"
2015	Punk'd	Herself	Episode: "Sanaa Lathan & Trey Songz"
2017	Shots Fired	Ashe Akino	Main cast
2018–2019	The Affair	Janelle	Main cast (season 4–5)
2019	The Twilight Zone	Nina Harrison	Episode: "Replay"
2020–2023	Harley Quinn	Selina Kyle / Catwoman (voice)	Recurring cast (season 2–4)
2021	Solos	Nia (voice)	Episode: "Sasha"
2021	Hit & Run	Naomi Hicks	Main cast
2021	Succession	Lisa Arthur	Recurring cast (season 3)
2022	The Best Man: The Final Chapters	Robyn Stewart	Main cast
2024	Curb Your Enthusiasm	Sibby Sanders	2 episodes

=== Video games ===
Year	Title	Voice role	Notes
2014	Family Guy: The Quest for Stuff	Donna Tubbs	
2016	Zen Pinball 2	Alexa "Lex" Woods	
2016	Pinball FX 2	Alexa "Lex" Woods	
2016	Pinball FX 3	Alexa "Lex" Woods	

=== Music videos ===
Year	Title	Artist	Role
1997	“Don’t Say”	Jon B.	Girlfriend
2001	“What If”	Babyface	Girlfriend
2014	"Imagine" (UNICEF: World version)	Various	Herself

== Awards and nominations ==
Year	Nominated work	Award	Category	Result
2000	The Best Man	NAACP Image Award	Outstanding Supporting Actress in a Motion Picture	Nominated
2001	Love & Basketball	BET Award	Best Actress	Won
2001	Love & Basketball	Independent Spirit Awards	Best Female Lead	Nominated
2001	Love & Basketball	Black Reel Award	Best Actress	Won
2001	Disappearing Acts	Black Reel Award	Best Actress	Nominated
2001	Love & Basketball	NAACP Image Award	Outstanding Actress in a Motion Picture	Won
2003	Brown Sugar	NAACP Image Award	Outstanding Actress in a Motion Picture	Nominated
2003	Brown Sugar	Black Reel Award	Best Actress	Nominated
2003	A Raisin in the Sun	Tony Award	Best Featured Actress in a Play	Nominated
2004	Out of Time	Black Reel Award	Best Actress	Won
2004	Out of Time	NAACP Image Award	Outstanding Supporting Actress in a Motion Picture	Nominated
2004	A Raisin in the Sun	Theatre World Award	Best Female Lead	Won
2006	Something New	Black Movie Awards	Best Actress	Nominated
2006	Something New	Black Reel Award	Best Actress	Nominated
2007	Something New	NAACP Image Award	Outstanding Actress in a Motion Picture	Nominated
2007	Nip/Tuck	NAACP Image Award	Outstanding Supporting Actress in a Drama Series	Nominated
2008	The Family That Preys	Black Reel Award	Best Actress	Nominated
2009	A Raisin in the Sun	NAACP Image Award	Outstanding Actress in a Television Movie/Mini-Series	Nominated
2012	By The Way, Meet Vera Stark	Lucille Lortel Awards	Outstanding Lead Actress	Won
2012	By The Way, Meet Vera Stark	Drama Desk Award	Outstanding Actress in a Play	Nominated
2016	The Perfect Guy	NAACP Image Award	Outstanding Actress in a Motion Picture	Won
2019	Nappily Ever After	NAACP Image Award	Outstanding Actress in a Motion Picture	Nominated
2019	The Affair	NAACP Image Awards	Outstanding Supporting Actress in a Drama Series	Nominated
2022	Succession	Black Reel Award	Outstanding Guest Actress in a Drama Series	Won
2022	Succession	Primetime Emmy Awards	Outstanding Guest Actress in a Drama Series	Nominated
2023	The Best Man: The Final Chapters	NAACP Image Awards	Outstanding Actress in a Television Movie, Limited–Series or Dramatic Special	Nominated
2025	The Supremes at Earl's All-You-Can-Eat	NAACP Image Award	Outstanding Actress in a Limited Television (Series, Special or Movie)	Nominated
2025	Young. Wild. Free.	NAACP Image Award	Outstanding Supporting Actress in a Limited Television (Series, Special, or Movie)	Nominated
