= Row K Entertainment =

American motion picture company

- Type: Private
- Industry: Film
- Founded: August 26, 2025; 14 months ago
- Headquarters: West Hollywood, CA, U.S.
- Parent: Media Capital Technologies
- Website: rowkpresents.com

Row K Entertainment is an American motion picture distribution company based in West Hollywood, California, which is a subsidiary of Media Capital Technologies. Their physical releases are distributed by Alliance Entertainment (who also distribute films from Paramount Home Entertainment and MGM Home Entertainment on physical media as of early 2026).

== History ==
Row K Entertainment was founded in August 2025 as a U.S. theatrical distribution company by Media Capital Technologies (MCT). MCT principals Christopher Woodrow and Raj Singh serve as co-chairman of the company. Megan Colligan, a former president of IMAX Entertainment and president of worldwide marketing and distribution at Paramount Pictures, was appointed as the company's president.

In September 2025, Row K acquired North American distribution rights to several feature films, including Gus Van Sant's festival drama Dead Man's Wire, the indie romance Charlie Harper, Maude Apatow's directorial debut Poetic License, and Cliffhanger, a remake of the 1993 action film, featuring Pierce Brosnan and Lily James.

In March 2026, Row K acquired the film rights to Mister which is slated to release in 2027, with Walton Goggins, and Chloë Grace Moretz set to star which will be directed by Wade Eastwood. That same month, a report published by Variety detailed Row K's financial problems, including unpaid bills and vendors and consultants awaiting compensation for months, leading to work stoppages and legal threats. Shortly after, citing an inability to fulfill legal obligations on Poetic License, Row K decided to drop distribution rights to the film, with its president Megan Colligan, chief revenue officer Mo Rhim, and chief marketing officer Ben Carlson reportedly looking to exit the company. It was originally supposed to attend at 2026 CinemaCon, but dropped out with Sony Pictures Classics taking its place; the latter would also acquire distribution rights to Poetic License in July 2026. In September, Vertical acquired the rights to Cliffhanger. In October, after missing payments on settle agreements, the company was put on ice.

== Filmography ==
Release date	Title	Director	Refs
January 9, 2026	Dead Man's Wire	Gus Van Sant	
September 25, 2026	Charlie Harper	Tom Dean and Mac Eldridge	
2027	Mister	Wade Eastwood	
