= Wyck Godfrey =

American film and television producer

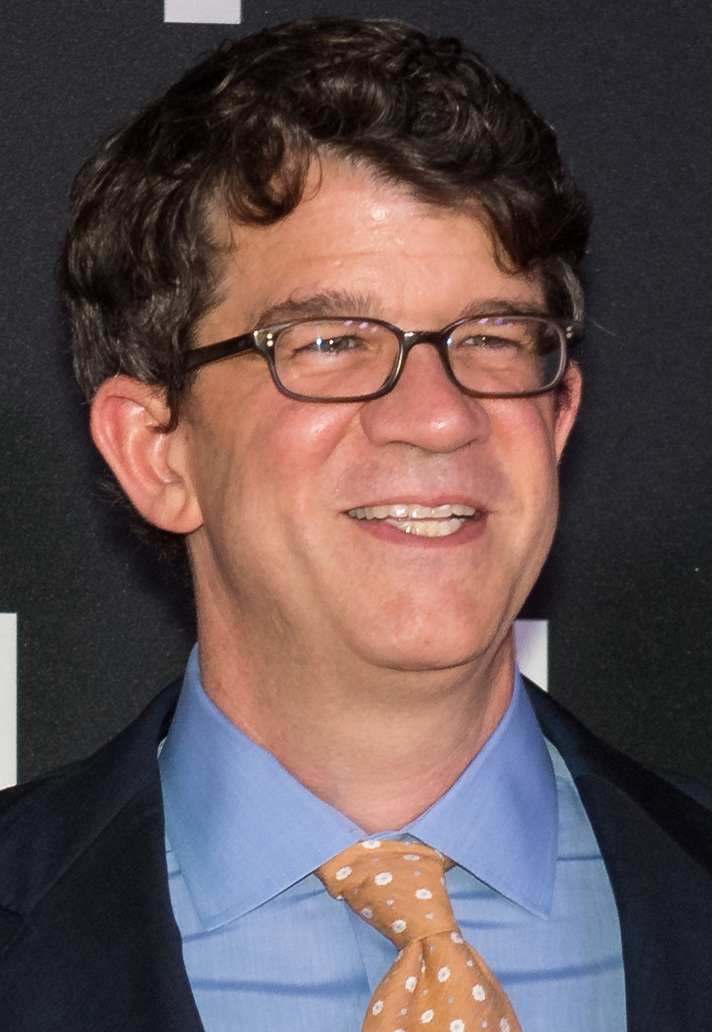
- Godfrey in October 2018
- Born: United States
- Occupation: Producer
- Years active: 2001−present
- Spouse: Mary Kerr

Wyck Godfrey is an American film and television producer. He is best known for co-founding the production company Temple Hill Entertainment with Marty Bowen in 2006. He was also named President of Paramount Motion Pictures Group in 2017, but returned to Temple Hill in 2020.

== Early life ==
Godfrey was raised Christian. He graduated from Science Hill High School in Johnson City, Tennessee, earned a degree in English literature from Princeton University, and later moved to New York City to intern at New Line Cinema.

== Career ==
In February 2006, Godfrey and Marty Bowen established the production company Temple Hill Entertainment and produced The Nativity Story as their first film. He produced the five films in The Twilight Saga series from 2008 to 2012, and produced the 2014 young adult novel adaptation The Fault in Our Stars. He also produced the three films in The Maze Runner series. He left Temple Hill in 2017 upon being named President of Paramount Motion Pictures Group, but returned to the company in 2020.

== Personal life ==
Godfrey is married to Mary Kerr.

== Filmography ==
=== Film ===
Year	Title	Role	Notes
1996	Swingers	—N/a	Thanked in credits
2001	Behind Enemy Lines	Executive producer	
2003	Daddy Day Care	Producer	
2004	I, Robot	Producer	
2004	Alien vs. Predator	Executive producer	
2004	First Daughter	Producer	
2004	Flight of the Phoenix	Producer	
2006	When a Stranger Calls	Producer	
2006	Dr. Dolittle 3	Executive producer	Direct-to-video
2006	The Nativity Story	Producer	
2006	Eragon	Producer	
2008	Management	Producer	
2008	Twilight	Producer	
2008	SEAL Team VI	—N/a	Thanked in credits
2009	The Twilight Saga: New Moon	Producer	
2010	Dear John	Producer	
2010	The Twilight Saga: Eclipse	Producer	
2010	Everything Must Go	Producer	
2011	10 Years	Producer	
2011	The Twilight Saga: Breaking Dawn – Part 1	Producer	Uncredited cameo as Wedding Guest
2012	The Twilight Saga: Breaking Dawn – Part 2	Producer	
2013	A Good Day to Die Hard	Producer	
2013	Safe Haven	Producer	
2014	The Fault in Our Stars	Producer	
2014	The Maze Runner	Producer	
2015	Tracers	Producer	
2015	The Longest Ride	Producer	
2015	Paper Towns	Producer	
2015	Maze Runner: The Scorch Trials	Producer	
2015	Martyrs	Producer	
2017	Power Rangers	Producer	
2018	Maze Runner: The Death Cure	Producer	
2018	Love, Simon	Producer	
2018	Uncle Drew	Producer	
2018	Down a Dark Hall	Producer	
2018	First Man	Producer	
2018	The Hate U Give	Producer	
2018	Life Itself	Producer	
2019	The Kill Team	Producer	
2020	All Together Now	Executive producer	
2020	Happiest Season	Executive producer	
2022	Emergency	Executive producer	
2022	On the Come Up	Producer	
2022	Smile	Producer	
2022	Babylon	Executive producer	
2023	Somebody I Used to Know	Producer	
2024	Turtles All the Way Down	Producer	
2024	The Supremes at Earl's All-You-Can-Eat	Producer	
2025	Clown in a Cornfield	Producer	
2025	The Map That Leads to You	Producer	
2025	Charlie Harper	Producer	
2026	People We Meet on Vacation	Producer	
2026	Seekers of Infinite Love	Producer	
2027	Children of Blood and Bone	Producer	
TBA	The King and I	Producer	
TBA	The Wonderful Wizard of Oz	Producer	
TBA	Rule of Three	Producer	

=== Television ===
Year	Title	Role	Notes
2001	Behind Enemy Lines	Executive producer	Documentary
2011−2015	Revenge	Executive producer	
2012	Revenge: From the Beginning	—N/a	Thanked in credits Television film
2012	Revenge: The First Chapter	—N/a	Thanked in credits Television film
2015−2017	Rosewood	Executive producer	
2019	Looking for Alaska	Executive producer	
2017−2019	Mr. Mercedes	Executive producer	
2020−2022	Love, Victor	Executive producer	
2023	Dave	Executive producer	
2023	Grease: Rise of the Pink Ladies	Executive producer	
2023	The Other Black Girl	Executive producer	
TBA	Day Job	Executive producer	
—N/a	Behind Enemy Lines	Executive producer	Pilot
