= Jamie Linden (writer) =

American screenwriter (born 1980)

- Born: September 3, 1980 (age 46); Winter Park, Florida, U.S.
- Education: Florida State University
- Occupation: Screenwriter
- Partner(s): Rachel McAdams (2016–present)
- Children: 2
- Writing career
- Notable work: We Are Marshall

Jamie Linden (born September 3, 1980) is an American screenwriter best known for We Are Marshall (2006) and Dear John (2010). He also wrote and directed 10 Years (2011).

== Early life ==
Linden grew up in Winter Park, Florida, near Orlando, where he attended Lake Howell High School. He attended Florida State University's College of Communication, majoring in marketing and media production. After graduating from college in 2001, he and three friends traveled to Hollywood, California with tickets for game show The Price Is Right. Upon arriving, he was individually called up to compete and won US$5,000 and a Tuscan wine server cart, which he saw as a sign to stay in Hollywood: "I thought, well that's a sign, 'I should stay.' What you want to do, finds you."

== Career ==
Before Linden became a screenwriter, he worked at Mirage Enterprises as an assistant to directors Sydney Pollack and Anthony Minghella. After reading in a 30th anniversary article in FSView & Florida Flambeau, Florida State's student newspaper, about the 1970 Southern Airways Flight 932 plane crash that killed most of the Marshall University Thundering Herd football team, Linden says he became "obsessed" with the story. After moving to Hollywood, his first job involved reading feature film screenplays. After being fired from several assistant positions, he decided to write his own screenplay. His first script was titled Things to Do Before I Die, co-written with University of Florida alumnus Cory Helms, and Warner Bros. gave the pair a blind deal to write another script. Linden says the aftermath of the Marshall University tragedy was the very first story he ever thought of. In 2004, he pitched the story to Warner Bros. with film producers Basil Iwanyk and Mary Viola. When Warner Bros. bought the script, Linden and other film crew met with many family members of the plane crash victims including Keith Morehouse, whose father was killed in the crash, to collaborate on the honesty of the script and the dignity of the victims. The film became We Are Marshall, released in 2006 and directed by McG (Joseph McGinty Nichol), founder of Wonderland Sound and Vision.

In 2006, it was reported that Linden was writing a biographical film about Olympic gold medalist downhill skier Bill Johnson to be produced by Basil Iwanyk, as well as an adaptation of The Dogs of Babel to be produced by David Heyman and a television pilot titled Flash Back to be directed by McG.

== Personal life ==
In 2016, Linden started dating Canadian actress Rachel McAdams, with whom he had a son in 2018 and a daughter in 2020.

== Filmography ==
Year	Title	Director	Writer	Co-Producer	Notes
2006	We Are Marshall	No	Yes	Yes	
2010	Dear John	No	Yes	Yes	
2011	10 Years	Yes	Yes	No	
2016	Money Monster	No	Yes	No	
2021	Chaos Walking	No	Uncredited	No	Rewrites
