= Earl Lestz =

American film director

- Born: Earl Spencer Lestz; August 23, 1938; Philadelphia, Pennsylvania, U.S.
- Died: June 6, 2017 (aged 78); Los Angeles, California, U.S.
- Occupations: CEO of Plymouth Rock Studios, Former President of Paramount Studio Group

Earl Spencer Lestz (August 23, 1938 – June 6, 2017) was an American film studio executive who was President of the Studio Group at Paramount Pictures in Los Angeles from 1985 to 2005. He was later the Master Planning Director of Plymouth Rock Studios, a new film and television studio being developed in Plymouth, Massachusetts. Lestz served as vice chair on the Executive Committee of the Hollywood Chamber of Commerce. In addition, he served as Chairman of the Board of the Hollywood Entertainment Museum, as Vice Chairman of the Hollywood Historic Trust, on the board of directors of the Entertainment Industry Foundation, and on the Board of Governors of Goodwill Industries of Southern California. He was a member of both the Academy of Motion Picture Arts and Sciences and the Academy of Television Arts and Sciences. In 2004, Lestz was honored with a star on the Hollywood Walk of Fame.

== Biography ==
=== Paramount ===
As President of the Paramount Studio Group, Lestz transformed the studio operations from a several million dollar per year loss leader into a $50 million per year profit center by developing over 500,000 square feet (46,000 m^{2}) of new facilities on the lot. This development included updating the studio's sound stages to attract television productions such as Entertainment Tonight and Dr. Phil and expanding the post production capacity of the studio fivefold. Lestz was also instrumental in developing Paramount's child care center, a first for a studio.

=== Plymouth Rock Studios ===
Lestz acted as CEO of Plymouth Rock Studios, a film and television production studio that opened in 2010 and was located in Plymouth, Massachusetts. Lestz headed the project alongside David Kirkpatrick, former President of Production at Paramount Pictures. The project, a response to the film tax credit implemented by Governor Deval Patrick in Massachusetts in 2007, was predicted to create over 2,000 high-income jobs. As CEO, Lestz also oversaw smaller branch organizations under the umbrella of Plymouth Rock Studios, such as Rock Media and the Rock Educational Cooperative.

Earl Lestz died of a heart attack in 2017 at the age of 78.
