= Dora Bryan =

English actress (1923–2014)

Dora Bryan OBE
- Born: Dora May Broadbent; 7 February 1923; Southport, Lancashire, England
- Died: 23 July 2014 (aged 91); Brighton and Hove, East Sussex, England
- Resting place: Woodvale Cemetery and Crematorium, Brighton, East Sussex, England
- Occupations: Actress; Hotelier
- Years active: 1947–2006
- Spouse: Bill Lawton (m. 1954; died 2008)
- Children: 3 (2 adopted)

Dora May Broadbent (7 February 1923 – 23 July 2014), known as Dora Bryan, was an English actress of stage, film and television. She won the BAFTA Award for Best British Actress for A Taste of Honey (1961) and the Laurence Olivier Award for Best Actress in a Supporting Role in 1995 for The Birthday Party.

== Early life ==
Bryan was born in Southport, Lancashire. Her father was a salesman and she attended Hathershaw County Primary School in Oldham, Lancashire. Her career began in pantomime before the Second World War, during which she joined ENSA in Italy to entertain British troops.

== Career ==
=== Stage ===
Bryan made her stage debut as a child in a pantomime in Manchester, and encouraged by her mother, joined the Oldham Coliseum while still a teenager. After spending six years honing her craft there, she moved to London to develop her stage career, becoming a regular performer in the West End. Cast in a production of Noël Coward's Private Lives, the actress was encouraged to adopt a stage name by Coward himself. She opted for Dora Bryant, which she often said was inspired by a box of Bryant and May matches that were lying on the table, but a typographical error left off the last letter on the theatre credits and she became Dora Bryan.

In 1955, Bryan made her debut in West End musical comedy with her performance as Lily Bell in a production of A.P. Herbert's The Water Gipsies. Singing the show's hit songs, "Why Did You Call Me Lily?", "You Never Know with Men", and "It Would Cramp My Style", such was her personal success that the billing outside the theatre was changed after the first night to "Dora Bryan in A.P. Herbert's The Water Gipsies.

Throughout her career, she continued to perform on the stage, often appearing in musicals such as Gentleman Prefer Blondes (1962) and Hello, Dolly! (1966–1968). She also headlined a number of stage revues such as The Dora Bryan Show (1966), My Name Is Dora (1967) and An Evening with Dora Bryan and Friends (1968). She made her Broadway debut as Mrs. Pearce in Pygmalion (1987), starring Peter O'Toole and Amanda Plummer. Other credits include her first Shakespearean role, Mistress Quickly in The Merry Wives of Windsor (1984), Mrs. Hardcastle in She Stoops to Conquer (1985) and in Kander and Ebb's 70, Girls, 70 (1991) to great acclaim. She appeared with Trevor Peacock in the National Theatre's 1994 revival of Harold Pinter's The Birthday Party.

=== Screen roles and other work ===
Instantly recognisable from her voice, which became a trademark of her performances, Bryan followed many of her theatre contemporaries into film acting, generally playing supporting roles. She often played women of easy virtue—for example in The Fallen Idol (1948), one of her early films, and Ealing's The Blue Lamp (1950). She appeared in similarly stereotypical female roles in other films, for example Gift Horse (1952), The Cockleshell Heroes (1955), The Green Man (1956) and Carry On Sergeant (1958).

Bryan appeared in radio comedy series including Much-Binding-in-the-Marsh. British Pathe filmed Bryan in 1957 in 'Home on Wheels', featuring her and friends in her personal caravan. She appeared in the film A Taste of Honey (1961), which won four BAFTA awards, including Best Actress for Bryan and Best British Film. In 1963, she recorded the Christmas song "All I Want for Christmas Is a Beatle", which reached no. 20 on the UK charts. She played the Headmistress in The Great St. Trinian's Train Robbery (1966), and she starred in According to Dora (1968–1969), her own television series for the BBC.

Bryan appeared in the UK-Argentine thriller Apartment Zero (1988). The film was directed by Martin Donovan and starred Hart Bochner and Colin Firth. Bryan plays the role of one of two eccentric characters (the other was played by Liz Smith) described by The Washington Post as two "tea-and-crumpet gargoyle-featured spinsters who snoop the corridors". It featured in the 1988 Sundance Film Festival. She appeared in two episodes of series one of the BBC sitcom On The Up in 1990 as Mrs Carpenter (the mother of main character Tony, played by Dennis Waterman). She was replaced by actress Pauline Letts for series two and three.

In 1998, Bryan made an appearance in the Victoria Wood sitcom dinnerladies. In 2000, she joined the cast of the long-running BBC comedy series Last of the Summer Wine as Auntie Ros, and in 2001 she was a guest star in Absolutely Fabulous as June Whitfield's on-screen friend Dolly (originally called Milly when she appeared in 1996).

A few years later in 2005 her role in Last of the Summer Wine came to an end. At about the same time, she stopped making films. Her last screen appearance was in the short film Gone to the Dogs (2006) with Antony Booth. In 2006, she intended to appear both in the comedy Rock-a-Hula Rest Home at a pub theatre in Brighton and in the comedy There's No Place Like a Home, but she had to withdraw because of her inability to memorise her lines.

== Awards and testimonials ==
Her autobiography According to Dora was published in 1987 and was updated and republished in 1996. In 1996, she was awarded the OBE in recognition of her services to acting. The previous year she was awarded a Laurence Olivier Award for her role in the National Theatre production of the Harold Pinter play The Birthday Party. She was the subject of This Is Your Life on two occasions, in April 1962 when she was surprised by Eamonn Andrews at her home in Brighton, and in January 1989 when Michael Aspel surprised her on the stage of the Manchester Opera House at the curtain call of Hello, Dolly!. An exhibition about Bryan opened on 13 September 2013 at Rottingdean Museum.

== Personal life ==
Bryan was married for 54 years to former Lancashire and Cumberland cricketer Bill Lawton until his death in August 2008. The couple met in Oldham during World War II and were married at Werneth St Thomas, Oldham in 1954. During her husband's final years, she reduced her public commitments to enable her to look after him, and she suffered with her health, including a serious operation for a hernia.

Bryan once owned Clarges Hotel at 115–119 Marine Parade on Brighton's seafront, which was used as an exterior location in the films Carry On at Your Convenience and Carry On Girls. She and her husband lived there for more than 40 years but were forced to sell the bulk of the building because of bankruptcy, but they retained a flat with a sea view on the first floor for many years. Still maintaining its original structure, the rooms of the hotel have been reconverted into flats. By 2013, she was a wheelchair user and resided in a nursing home in Hove in frail health.

On 31 May 2009, Dora – A Gala Charity Show was held at Her Majesty's Theatre in London to raise funds for two charities nominated by Bryan: the Variety Club Children's Charity and the Alzheimer's Society. Sir Cliff Richard was the star performer, and among the performers and celebrity guests were old friends and colleagues, including June Whitfield, Rita Tushingham, and Joanna Lumley. Bryan managed to attend.

== Death ==
Bryan died on 23 July 2014 at the age of 91. Her funeral service was held on 6 August 2014 at St George's Church, Brighton, where she had regularly attended services.

== Selected filmography ==
- Odd Man Out (1947) - Girl in Telephone Kiosk (uncredited)
- The Fallen Idol (1948) - Rose
- No Room at the Inn (1948) - Spiv's Girlfriend (uncredited)
- Once Upon a Dream (1949) - Barmaid
- Now Barabbas (1949) - Winnie
- Adam and Evelyne (1949) - Blonde Sales Assistant (uncredited)
- Don't Ever Leave Me (1949) - Beautician (uncredited)
- The Interrupted Journey (1949) - Waitress
- The Cure for Love (1949) - Jenny Jenkins
- The Blue Lamp (1950) - Maisie
- Traveller's Joy (1950) - Eva
- No Trace (1950) - Maisie Phelps
- Something in the City (1950) - Waitress
- Files from Scotland Yard (1951) - Minnie Robinson
- The Quiet Woman (1951) - Elsie
- Circle of Danger (1951) - Bubbles Fitzgerald
- Scarlet Thread (1951) - Maggie
- No Highway in the Sky (1951) - Rosie, Barmaid (uncredited)
- Lady Godiva Rides Again (1951) - Lady in Charge of Publicity
- High Treason (1951) - Mrs. Bowers
- Whispering Smith Investigates (1952) - La Fosse
- 13 East Street (1952) - Valerie
- Gift Horse (1952) - Glad Flanagan
- Mother Riley Meets the Vampire (1952) - Tilly
- Time Gentlemen, Please! (1952) - Peggy Stebbins
- The Ringer (1952) - Mrs. Hackett
- Women of Twilight (1952) - Olga
- Made in Heaven (1952) - Ethel Jenkins
- Miss Robin Hood (1952) - Pearl
- Street Corner (1953) - Prostitute at Police Station
- The Fake (1953) - Barmaid
- The Intruder (1953) - Dora Bee
- You Know What Sailors Are (1954) - Gladys
- Fast and Loose (1954) - Mary Rawlings, the maid
- The Young Lovers (1954) - Switchboard Operator (uncredited)
- The Crowded Day (1954) - Customer
- Mad About Men (1954) - Berengaria
- As Long as They're Happy (1955) - May
- See How They Run (1955) - Ida
- You Lucky People! (1955) - Sgt. Hortense Tipp
- The Cockleshell Heroes (1955) - Myrtle
- Child in the House (1956) - Cassie
- The Green Man (1956) - Lily
- Small Hotel (1957)
- The Man Who Wouldn't Talk (1958) - Telephonist
- Carry On Sergeant (1958) - Norah
- Operation Bullshine (1959) - Pvt. Cox
- Desert Mice (1959) - Gay
- Follow That Horse! (1960) - Miss Bradstock
- The Night We Got the Bird (1961) - Julie Skidmore
- A Taste of Honey (1961) - Helen
- The Great St. Trinian's Train Robbery (1966) - Amber Spottiswood
- The Sandwich Man (1966) - Mrs De Vere
- Two a Penny (1968) - Ruby Hopkins
- Hands of the Ripper (1971) - Mrs Golding
- Up the Front (1972) - Cora Crumpington
- Screamtime (1983) - Emma
- Apartment Zero (1988) - Margaret McKinney
- MirrorMask (2005) - Aunt Nan

== Television roles ==
Year	Title	Role	Notes
1956	My Wife's Sister	Dora	4 episodes
1958-1959	BBC Sunday Night Theatre	Various	3 episodes
1961–1964	Happily Ever After	Dora Morgan	12 episodes
1962-1963	The Dickie Henderson Show		2 episodes
1967	Before the Fringe		5 episodes
1969	Theatre Date	Various	Episode: "They Don't Grow On Trees"
1970	ITV Sunday Night Theatre	Bunty	Episode: "When Johnny Comes Marching Home"
1972	Both Ends Meet / Dora	Dora Page	13 episodes
1973	Stars on Sunday	Mrs. Gamp	Episode: "Glories of Christmas"
1975	The Sooty Show		2 episodes
1983	Triangle	Woman	1 episode
1984	Foxy Lady	Ada Breeze	1 episode
1986	Victoria Wood: As Seen On TV	Pam's Mother	1 episode
1990	On the Up	Tony's Mum	2 episode
1992	Virtual Murder	Mrs. Mim	Episode: "A Bone to Pick"
1992	Casualty	Hester Blewett	Episode: "Cherish"
1993	Frank Stubbs Promotes	Molly Bramley	Episode: "Paint"
1993	Heartbeat	Jane Thompson	Episode: "The Frighteners"
1994	Mother's Ruin	Kitty Flitcroft	6 episodes
1995	Boon	Simone	Episode: "Thieves Like Us"
1995	Performance	Bosom Lady	Episode: "Bed"
1995	Moving Story	Maureen Stevens	Episode: "Trivial Pursuits"
1996-2001	Absolutely Fabulous	Millie / Dolly	2 episodes
1998	dinnerladies	Connie	Episode: "Moods"
2000	Doctors	Lilly Anderson	Episode: "Second Time Around"
2000–2005	Last of the Summer Wine	Ros Utterthwaite	(50 episodes)
2001	Bernard's Watch	Marjorie Bell	Episode: "Alien Times"
2002	Holby City	Betty Wheeler	Episode: "Lives Worth Living"
2004	Catterick	Mrs. Trethrewick	Pilot
