= Plymouth Rock (disambiguation) =

Plymouth Rock is the disembarkation site of the Mayflower Pilgrims in 1620.

Plymouth Rock may also refer to:

- Plymouth, Rock County, Wisconsin
- Plymouth Rock chicken
- Plymouth Rock Studios
- USS Plymouth Rock (LSD-29)
