= List of Australian television ratings for 1997 =

The following is a list of Australian television ratings for the year 1997.

== Network shares ==
Market	Network shares
Market	ABC1	Seven	Nine	Ten	SBS
5 cities	14.3%	29.5%	32.6%	20.7%	2.8%
Sydney	15.4%	27.3%	33.2%	20.9%	3.2%
Melbourne	13.7%	29.4%	34.4%	20.2%	2.3%
Brisbane	13.7%	31.0%	32.0%	20.4%	2.9%
Adelaide	12.4%	32.3%	31.7%	20.7%	2.9%
Perth	15.8%	31.0%	27.9%	22.2%	3.1%

* Data gathered by then ratings supplier: A.C Neilsen Australia

== Highest rated programs ==
Rank	Broadcast	Network	Audience
1	1997 AFL Grand Final (Adelaide Vs St.Kilda)	7	2,787,000
2	Movie - Forrest Gump	9	2,685,000
3	Movie - True Lies	7	2,467,000
4	Blue Heelers (1997 SEASON AVERAGE)	7	2,441,000
5	Movie - Muriel's Wedding	9	2,416,000
6	Movie - Speed	7	2,322,000
7	Movie - The Adventures of Priscilla, Queen of the Desert	7	2,314,000
8	Friends (1997 SEASON AVERAGE)	9	2,291,000
9	TV Week Logie Awards	9	2,281,000
10	A Current Affair - Special	9	2,183,000
11	Blue Heelers - Monday Episode	7	2,181,000
12	Mr. Bean (1997 SEASON AVERAGE)	7	2,051,000
13	Movie - It Could Happen to You	9	2,005,000
14	Movie - Cool Runnings	7	1,984,000
15	Kangaroo Palace - Part One	7	1,982,000
16	ER (1997 SEASON AVERAGE)	9	1,972,000
17	Movie - Ace Ventura: Pet Detective	7	1,968,000
18	Asteroid - Part One	10	1,953,000
19	Suddenly Susan (1997 SEASON AVERAGE)	9	1,941,000
20	Movie - Richie Rich	9	1,929,000

== Top rated regular programmes ==
Rank	Broadcast	Network	Audience
1	Blue Heelers	7	2,441,000
2	Friends	9	2,291,000
3	Mr. Bean	7	2,051,000
4	ER	9	1,972,000
5	Suddenly Susan	9	1,941,000
6	This Is Your Life	9	1,903,000
7	National Nine News	9	1,897,000
8	National Nine News Sunday	9	1,834,000
9	Better Homes and Gardens	7	1,811,000
10	Australia's Funniest Home Videos	9	1,779,000

== See also ==
- Television ratings in Australia
