= Greg Gardiner =

American cinematographer

- Born: Gregory B. Gardiner; New York City, U.S.
- Occupation: Cinematographer
- Years active: 1980–present

Gregory B. Gardiner is an American cinematographer, known mostly for comedy productions.

== Filmography ==
=== Film ===
Year	Title	Director	Notes
1990	Far Out Man	Tommy Chong	With Eric Woster
1992	The Unnamable II: The Statement of Randolph Carter	Jean-Paul Ouellette	With Roger Olkowski
1993	Suture	Scott McGehee; David Siegel	
1996	Somebody Is Waiting	Martin Donovan	
1997	The Apocalypse	Hubert de La Bouillerie	
1998	Homegrown	Stephen Gyllenhaal	
1998	Where's Marlowe?	Daniel Pyne	
1999	Anoosh of the Airways	James Westby	
2001	To End All Wars	David L. Cunningham	
2002	Orange County	Jake Kasdan	
2002	Big Trouble	Barry Sonnenfeld	
2002	Men in Black II	Barry Sonnenfeld	
2003	Biker Boyz	Reggie Rock Bythewood	
2003	Elf	Jon Favreau	
2004	New York Minute	Dennie Gordon	
2005	Son of the Mask	Lawrence Guterman	
2005	Herbie: Fully Loaded	Angela Robinson	
2006	She's the Man	Andy Fickman	
2007	The Game Plan	Andy Fickman	
2008	Welcome Home Roscoe Jenkins	Malcolm D. Lee	
2009	Race to Witch Mountain	Andy Fickman	
2010	Marmaduke	Tom Dey	
2012	Beverly Hills Chihuahua 3: Viva la Fiesta!	Lev L. Spiro; Yelena Lanskaya	Direct-to-video
2013	The Best Man Holiday	Malcolm D. Lee	
2014	Lucky Stiff	Christopher Ashley	
2016	Barbershop: The Next Cut	Malcolm D. Lee	
2016	The Journey	Nick Hamm	
2017	The Tank	Kellie Madison	
2017	Girls Trip	Malcolm D. Lee	
2018	Night School	Malcolm D. Lee	
2019	Little	Tina Gordon Chism	
2019	The Knight Before Christmas	Monika Mitchell	
2020	The War with Grandpa	Tim Hill	
2021	Resort to Love	Steven Tsuchida	
2022	Butter	Paul A. Kaufman	
2022	One True Loves	Andy Fickman	
2024	Saving Bikini Bottom: The Sandy Cheeks Movie	Liza Johnson	
2026	Strung	Malcolm D. Lee	

=== Television ===
Miniseries

Year	Title	Director
1998	Mr. Murder	Dick Lowry
2022	The Best Man: The Final Chapters	Malcolm D. Lee; Robert Townsend; Charles Stone III

TV movies

Year	Title	Director
1996	The Right to Remain Silent	Hubert C. de la Bouillerie
1997	Miracle in the Woods	Arthur Allan Seidelman
1998	The Patron Saint of Liars	Stephen Gyllenhaal
1998	Hollyweird	Jefery Levy
1999	Blood Money	Aaron Lipstadt
2008	Hackett	Barry Sonnenfeld
2009	My Fake Fiancé	Gil Junger
2010	Beauty & the Briefcase	Gil Junger
2015	Table 58	Gil Junger

== Awards ==
Year	Award	Category	Title	Result
1993	Independent Spirit Awards	Best Cinematography	Suture	Nominated
1993	Sundance Film Festival	Cinematography Award	Suture	Won
