= Wendy Richard =

British actress (1943–2009)

Wendy Richard MBE
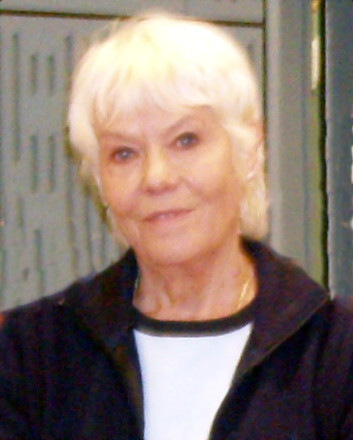
- Richard in 2007
- Born: Wendy Emerton; 20 July 1943; Middlesbrough, North Riding of Yorkshire, England
- Died: 26 February 2009 (aged 65); Harley Street, London, England
- Resting place: East Finchley Cemetery and Crematorium, East Finchley, London
- Education: Italia Conti Academy of Theatre Arts
- Occupation: Actress
- Years active: 1960–2009
- Known for: Are You Being Served? (1972–1985); EastEnders (1985–2006)
- Spouses: Leonard Blach (m. 1972; div. 1974); Will Thorpe (m. 1980; div. 1984); Paul Glorney (m. 1990; div. 1994); John Burns (m. 2008)

Wendy Richard (born Wendy Emerton; 20 July 1943 – 26 February 2009) was an English actress, best known for her television roles as Miss Shirley Brahms in the BBC sitcom Are You Being Served? from 1972 to 1985, and Pauline Fowler in the soap opera EastEnders from 1985 to 2006. In 1962, her distinctive Cockney vocals helped get her to No. 1 on the UK singles chart with the single "Come Outside" by Mike Sarne.

Despite being known for her Cockney accent, Richard was born in Middlesbrough. After a childhood in which her father died by suicide, she worked in department stores to pay her drama school fees before appearing regularly on-screen from the early 1960s. She played Joyce Harker in The Newcomers from 1967 to 1969. Richard then appeared in two Carry On films. In the television series Dad's Army she played Private Walker's girlfriend, and then was cast as Miss Brahms in Are You Being Served?, in which she appeared in all 69 episodes from 1972 to 1985. She also reprised the role in the sequel series Grace and Favour (also titled Are You Being Served? Again!) in 1992 and 1993.

After Are You Being Served? ended, Richard starred as Pauline Fowler in the first episode of EastEnders, a main role that she played in more than 2,000 episodes until she departed in 2006. After leaving EastEnders, Richard continued to appear on-screen until her death in 2009.

Richard was made an MBE in 2000 and was awarded the Lifetime Achievement Award at the 2007 British Soap Awards for her role in EastEnders.

Richard was diagnosed with breast cancer in 1996; the disease returned in 2002 and again in 2008; this time it had spread throughout her body. Richard made a documentary detailing the last few months of her life before her death in February 2009.

== Early life ==
Wendy Emerton, an only child, was born on 20 July 1943 in Middlesbrough. Her parents, Henry William (1892–1954) and Beatrice Reay (née Cutter; 1910–1972) Emerton, were publicans and ran the Corporation Hotel in the town; they had married in Paddington, London, in 1939. When Wendy was a baby, her family moved to Bournemouth. Whilst living in Bournemouth, Wendy and her friend got stuck after trying to climb the cliffs and had to be rescued by the fire brigade. The family later moved to the Isle of Wight, and then to London where they ran the Shepherds Tavern, Shepherd Market, Mayfair, where Elizabeth Taylor and Antony Armstrong-Jones, 1st Earl of Snowdon, are said to have been customers.

Richard enjoyed several family holidays to Jersey and Blackpool before attending the local school, St George's Hanover Square Primary, but her education was interrupted when her family moved again, this time to the Valentine Hotel at Gants Hill, Essex. A few months later they moved to the Streatham Park Hotel, Streatham, south London; it was there, in December 1954, that her father committed suicide. Richard, at the time aged 11, found his body. Beatrice Emerton never remarried, and died of liver cancer in May 1972.

She was enrolled at The Royal Masonic School for Girls in Rickmansworth after her father's death, for Henry had been a Freemason, and help with fees was provided by the organisation. She found the school excessively strict and her art mistress called her paintings and drawings "affected, rather like herself". Richard dreamed of becoming a TV continuity girl or film star from a young age and, after leaving school at 15, she enrolled at the Italia Conti Academy of Theatre Arts in London. She helped to pay her way through drama school by working in the fashion department at the Fortnum and Mason department store. She briefly worked at Fenwicks but was sacked after two days for telling a customer a coat did not suit her, after the customer had asked her for her opinion. It was at that time that she decided to change her surname to Richard, because "it was short and neat".

While at the Italia Conti, Richard became a model and picked up several modelling jobs for magazines such as Woman's Own. Still at drama school, she was run over by a car when crossing the road outside the Italia Conti school. Her injuries were so severe that her friend phoned Richard's mother from the hospital thinking she was dead; she had to have thirty-three stitches in her head. She made her television debut in November 1961 when she appeared alongside Mandy Rice-Davies with Sammy Davis Jr. in the ATV variety show Saturday Spectacular.

== Career ==
Upon leaving drama school, Richard wrote to theatrical agents, including Robert Stigwood, hoping to be taken on for work. In 1962, her distinctive cockney vocals helped get her to No. 1 on the UK singles chart with the single "Come Outside" by Mike Sarne who was managed by Stigwood. This was followed by many promotional appearances which exposed her to television audiences.

Drawing on from the success of "Come Outside", Richard was taken on by the Lom Artists agency, and her first role with her new agent was in the sitcom Bulldog Breed with Amanda Barrie for Granada Television before starring as Susan Sullivan, a receptionist, in five episodes of Harpers West One, an ATV television drama series about a fictional department store. Richard then appeared in series such as Danger Man, No Hiding Place, Hugh and I and The Contact with John Hurt. In 1965, she appeared in an episode of the original Likely Lads series as a household cleaner saleswoman called Lynn. Richard also appears in a scene cut from the released version of The Beatles movie Help! (1965). In addition, she had a small role as a nurse in Doctor in Clover (1966).

Richard first became familiar to television audiences in 1967 playing teenage supermarket till girl Joyce Harker, a regular character, in The Newcomers, until the show's end in 1969. After The Newcomers ended, Richard had a recurring role as Edith Parish (also called Shirley), Private Walker's usherette girlfriend in Dad's Army from 1970 to 1973, and had roles in several television series including Up Pompeii!, Please Sir! and On the Buses before appearing in Both Ends Meet, a sitcom about a sausage factory with Dora Bryan.

From 1972 to 1985, Richard was a regular cast member of the sitcom Are You Being Served? as Shirley Brahms, an attractive, young shop assistant with a strong Cockney accent. Set in the ladies and gentleman's clothing department in the fictional department store Grace Brothers, Miss Brahms worked under the eye of Mrs Slocombe and was the object of the advances of menswear junior Mr Lucas. Richard later reprised her role in the Are You Being Served? sequel Grace & Favour, which aired from 1992 to 1993.

Richard appeared in two Carry On films, playing small roles in Carry On Matron (1972) and Carry On Girls (1973) (both films also featured her future EastEnders colleague Barbara Windsor). Richard's other film roles around this time included No Blade of Grass (1970), Gumshoe (1971) starring Albert Finney, and the film versions of On The Buses (1971), Bless This House (1972), and Are You Being Served? (1977). While appearing in Are You Being Served?, she had parts in The Fenn Street Gang, Z Cars and Bowler as well as having regular roles in Hogg's Back and Not On Your Nellie.

=== EastEnders ===
The same year that Are You Being Served? ended, Richard began appearing as the matriarch Pauline Fowler in the BBC soap opera EastEnders, a role she played from the first episode in 1985. The character has been described as a "legend" and a television icon, but was also voted the 35th "most annoying person of 2006" (being the only fictional character to appear on the list). Pauline has been the subject of television documentaries, behind-the-scenes books, tie-in novels, and comedy sketch shows. On 10 July 2006, the BBC announced that Richard had decided to leave the series after more than 20 years. Until the onscreen death of her character at Christmas 2006, she was one of only two original cast members of that programme to appear continuously from the first episode in 1985, along with Adam Woodyatt, who played her on-screen nephew Ian Beale.

In 2007, Richard was awarded the Lifetime Achievement Award at The British Soap Awards for her role in EastEnders.

=== Later career ===
Richard appeared regularly on the BBC Radio 4 programme Just a Minute from 1988 to 1994. She returned for the programme's television iteration in 1999 and for further appearances on radio in 2002 and 2003.

In 2000, Richard was appointed Member of the Order of the British Empire (MBE) in the Queen's Birthday Honours.

In late 2006, Richard was seen as a guest presenter on the BBC's City Hospital series and on 31 March 2007, she presented the documentary A Tribute to John Inman, for BBC Two.

In April 2007, Richard announced that she would be appearing in a new role for the first time since leaving EastEnders, in a new sitcom penned by David Croft called Here Comes The Queen. The project came about after she personally asked Croft to write something for her. Richard had commented: "The part is like an older version of Miss Brahms". A pilot episode was made, which was considered to be poor, and it was never transmitted.

In September 2007, it was announced that Richard would appear in the second series of ITV1's sitcom Benidorm playing a "loud-mouthed, rude" character who used a wheelchair; her episode aired in April 2008.

In January 2008, adverts for The Post Office featuring Richard (as a human cannonball) began to be shown.

In February 2008, she landed the role of Mrs. Crump in the Agatha Christie's Marple episode "A Pocket Full of Rye" starring Julia McKenzie. This was her final role, airing after her death in 2009.

== Personal life ==
Richard was married four times. Her first marriage was to a music publisher, Len Blach, in 1972, which lasted five months. For six years, she lived with advertising director Will Thorpe whom she married in 1980; she left him after 18 months of marriage. She married for the third time, to Paul Glorney, a carpet fitter, in 1990. That marriage ended in divorce four years later. Richard later lived with John Burns, a painter and decorator 20 years her junior, in the Marylebone area of London. They lived together from 1996 and married on 10 October 2008 at a hotel in Mayfair. They remained together until her death four months later. She had no children.

Richard was a supporter of the Conservative Party. She was particularly supportive of Margaret Thatcher and her policies. During her early years on EastEnders, scriptwriters gave Richard a script in which Pauline Fowler launched into a tirade against Thatcher, but Richard refused to perform it.

=== Illness ===
In 1996, Richard was diagnosed with breast cancer. She had surgery and was given the all-clear, but experienced a recurrence of the disease in 2002. Her cancer went into remission after years of treatment and she was given a clean bill of health in 2005. Articles about her departure from EastEnders suggested that her health problems did not play any role in her decision, but was because her character in the soap remarried, to Richard's displeasure. Richard later said she left because of stress and that she had been stress-free since leaving the show. She kept in touch with co-stars Bill Treacher, Natalie Cassidy, Todd Carty, and James Alexandrou.

In January 2008, cancer cells were found in her left armpit, and it was reported in the Sunday Express on 5 October 2008 that she had been diagnosed with an aggressive form of breast cancer. Further investigation showed that it had metastasised to her left kidney and bones, including her spine and left ribs. It was reported the actress had planned her funeral and written her will. She made a half-hour programme, Wendy Richard: To Tell You the Truth, documenting the last three months of her life, which was broadcast on BBC One on 19 March 2009.

=== Death ===
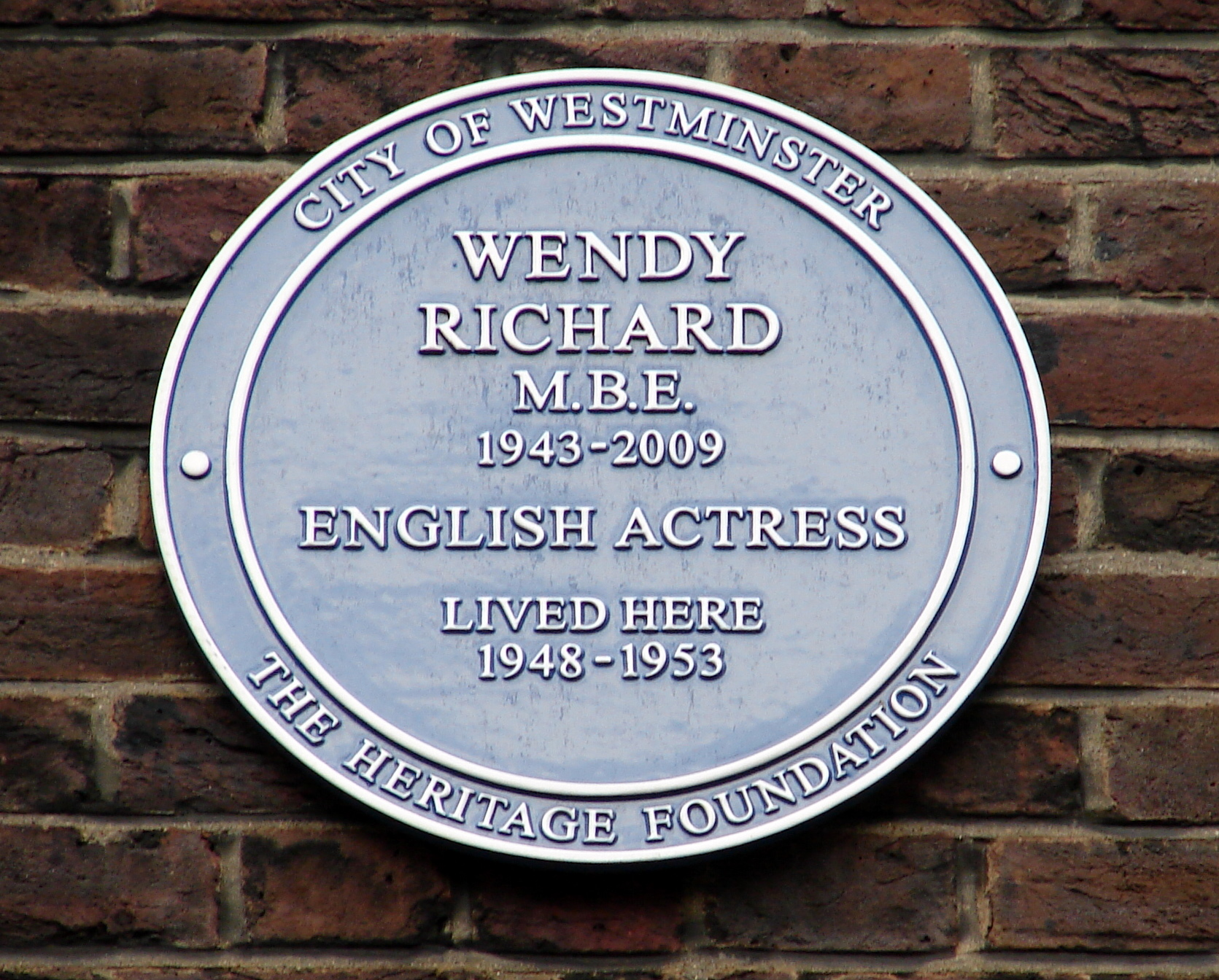
A commemorative plaque at The Chesterfield Arms in London in memory of Richard

Richard's agent, Kevin Francis, reported she had died on 26 February 2009 of breast cancer, aged 65, at a clinic in Harley Street, London. Her husband, John Burns, was at her bedside. Francis said: "She was incredibly brave and retained her sense of humour right to the end." On the day of her death, that evening's episode of EastEnders and a memorial programme, both dedicated to Richard, were broadcast on BBC One. Actor Bill Treacher, Richard's on-screen husband Arthur Fowler in EastEnders, said the actress was a "true professional".

Richard's funeral, on 9 March 2009 at St Marylebone Parish Church, was attended by figures from the media industry, along with many fans. Her body was later cremated at a private service at Golders Green Crematorium. In July 2009, David Croft, the creator of Are You Being Served?, unveiled a commemorative plaque at The Shepherds Tavern (since renamed The Chesterfield Arms) in Shepherd Street in London's West End, which Richard's parents had run. A number of entertainers were there to pay their respects on the occasion.

== Filmography ==
=== Film ===
Year	Title	Role	Notes
1963	The Contact	Joyce	Uncredited role
1966	Doctor in Clover	Nurse with False Eyelashes	Uncredited role
1970	No Blade Of Grass	Clara	
1971	On the Buses	Housewife	
1971	Gumshoe	Anne Scott	
1972	Bless This House	Carol	
1972	Carry On Matron	Miss Willing	
1973	Carry On Girls	Ida Downs	
1975	Naughty Girls	Girls' Voices	Voice, uncredited
1977	Are You Being Served?	Miss Shirley Brahms	

=== Television ===
Year	Title	Role	Notes
1961	Spectacular	Girl	1 episode: "Sammy Meets the Girls"
1962	Dixon of Dock Green	Jean Davis	1 episode: "The Outlaws"
1962	Harpers West One	Susan Sullivan	5 episodes
1962	Bulldog Breed	Mandy Bradshaw	Episode #1.7
1962	The Arthur Haynes Show	Uncredited	Episode #10.3
1963	ITV Television Playhouse	Brunette factory girl	1 episode: "The Wedding Dress"
1963	BBC Sunday-Night Play	Ida Green	1 episode: "The Holly Road Rig"
1963	First Night	Carol	1 episode: "The One Night of the Year "
1963	ITV Play of the Week	Miss Bufton	1 episode: "London Wall"
1964	HMS Paradise	Genevieve	1 episode: "Call Me Madam and I'll Punch You on the Nose"
1964	Danger Man	Sue	1 episode: "Don't Nail Him Yet"
1964	Don't I Look Like a Lord's Son?	The Girl	Television film
1964	No Hiding Place	Smiler	1 episode: "An Eye for an Eye"
1964–1965	Six	The Girl	2 episodes: "Don't I Look Like a Lord's Son?" & "The Day of Ragnarok"
1965	The Hollywood Palace	Dancing Extra, Captain Spaulding Scene	Uncredited role
1965	The Sullavan Brothers	Renee	1 episode: "Put Them Away for Keeps"
1965	Londoners	Patsy	1 episode: "Joe Nobody"
1965	The Likely Lads	Lynn	1 episode: "Last of the Big Spenders"
1965	No Hiding Place	Linda Hooper	1 episode: "The Hunted and the Hunters"
1965	No Hiding Place	Janet	1 episode: "Hi-Jack"
1966	Hugh and I	Unnamed	4 episodes
1966	Pardon the Expression	Girl with Dog	1 episode: "Rustle of Spring"
1966	Weavers Green	Jean	Episode #1.31
1966	ITV Play of the Week	Girl in Night Club (uncredited)	1 episode: "Plays of Married Life #1: A Catching Complaint"
1966	ITV Play of the Week	Betty	1 episode: "Plays of Married Life #4: The Bright Side"
1966	BBC Play of the Month	Sandra	1 episode: "The Making of Jericho"
1967	Turn Out the Lights	Veronica Woods	1 episode: "A Big Hand for a Little Lady"
1967	The Wednesday Play	Delphine	1 episode: "The Voices in the Park"
1967–1969	The Newcomers	Joyce Harker	Main role; 227 episodes
1970	Up Pompeii!	Soppia	1 episode: "The Ides of March"
1970	Carry On Again Christmas	Kate	Television film
1970	Dad's Army	Edith Parish	2 episodes: "The Two and a Half Feathers” & “Mum's Army"
1971	Dixon of Dock Green	Barbara Walker	1 episode: "Nightmare Hours"
1971	Please Sir!	Rita	1 episode: "The Pruning of the Hedges"
1971	On the Buses	Elsie	1 episode: "The Busmen's Ball"
1972	Both Ends Meet	Maudie	7 episodes
1972	Comedy Playhouse	Miss Shirley Brahms	1 episode: "Are You Being Served?"
1972–1985	Are You Being Served?	Miss Shirley Brahms	Main role; 69 episodes
1972–1973	Dad's Army	Shirley	2 episodes: "The King Was in His Counting House" & "My British Buddy"
1973	The Fenn Street Gang	Myrna	1 episode: "Is That a Proposal, Eric?"
1973	Z-Cars	Maureen Parker	1 episode: "Big Jake"
1973	Bowler	Greta	1 episode: "Members Only"
1975	Not On Your Nellie	Doris	6 episodes
1975	The Dick Emery Show	Housewife	Episode #14.6
1975	Hogg's Back	Pearl	6 episodes
1978	Whodunnit?	Phyllis Collier	1 episode: "A Safe Way to Die"
1979	The Little and Large Show	Unnamed	1 episode
1983	West Country Tales	Jill-Mother	1 episode: "With Love, Belinda"
1985–2006	EastEnders	Pauline Fowler	Series regular; 2,058 episodes
1992–1993	Grace & Favour	Miss Shirley Brahms	Main role, 12 episodes
1993	Doctor Who: Dimensions in Time	Pauline Fowler	Charity special crossover between Doctor Who and EastEnders
2007	Arena	Listeners' Comments	Voice role
2007	Here Comes the Queen	Lillian Wills	Pilot episode
2008	Benidorm	Sylvia	Episode #2.5
2008	Agatha Christie's Marple	Mrs Crump	1 episode: "A Pocket Full of Rye"
