= The Substitute (1993 film) =

1993 American television film

- VHS cover
- Genre: Thriller drama
- Written by: Cynthia Verlaine
- Directed by: Martin Donovan
- Starring: Amanda Donohoe; Dalton James; Natasha Gregson Wagner; Marky Mark
- Music by: Gerald Gouriet
- Country of origin: United States
- Original language: English

Production
- Executive producer: David Paul Kirkpatrick
- Producer: Matthew O'Connor
- Production location: Vancouver
- Cinematography: Glen MacPherson
- Editor: Louise Innes
- Running time: 86 minutes
- Production companies: Pacific Motion Pictures; Wilshire Court Productions

Original release
- Network: USA Network
- Release: September 22, 1993

The Substitute is a 1993 American thriller drama television film directed by Martin Donovan, written by David S. Goyer (under the pseudonym Cynthia Verlaine), and starring Amanda Donohoe as a murderous high school substitute teacher. The film also stars Dalton James, Natasha Gregson Wagner, and Mark Wahlberg (credited as Marky Mark) in his first acting role. It premiered on the USA Network on September 22, 1993.

== Plot ==
In Albany, New York, high school English teacher Gayle Richards finds out that her husband Doug is cheating on her with Claire, one of her students. She murders both him and his mistress in an outburst of rage, sets their house on fire, and flees into the night. One year later, Gayle has moved to Baker Springs, Minnesota, and takes a job as a substitute English teacher at another high school under the assumed name Laura Ellington. One of the students, Josh Wyatt, becomes infatuated with "Laura" and on her first day, he gives her a ride back to her motel room where she seduces him, but discards him the following day.

As the scorned Josh seeks to find a way to get revenge against Laura for using him, she meets and begins having an affair of her own with Josh's widowed father, Ben, who is also infatuated with the mysterious and attractive teacher. While Josh seeks to keep his brief tryst with Laura a secret, he also recruits his unsuspecting girlfriend, Jenny, to help him find any evidence against Laura when she moves into the house across the street from him and his father.

Things become more complicated when news about her past starts to reemerge, forcing Laura to embark on yet another killing spree to protect her identity and her crimes. When Laura learns that the teacher she is substituting for will be returning early, she breaks into her house and shoves her down a staircase, causing the teacher to die from a heart attack. But Laura is witnessed entering the house by one trouble-making student, named Ryan Westerburg, who attempts to blackmail her. However, Laura kills Ryan and covers it up to make it look like a gang killing.

Convinced that Laura is responsible for the two mysterious deaths, Josh begins to uncover Laura's past by sneaking into her house one evening during a school dance and finds evidence of her former identity. But Josh cannot convince anyone, not even his skeptic father, that Laura is not who she claims to be. When Josh inadvertently reveals his tryst with Laura to Jenny, she breaks up with him. When Jenny tells Ben about Josh's cheating on her and of his personal investigation into Laura, she walks in on them. Later, Laura follows Jenny into the school and attempts to murder her too by chasing her under the bleachers in the school gym and pushes the automatic button to make the bleachers fold up, nearly crushing Jenny to death.

Jenny survives long enough to be brought to the hospital where she tells Josh what Laura did. After looking up old newspaper records at a library, Josh finally learns of Laura's past and real identity. When Ben confronts Laura that same evening in her classroom as she is attempting to pack up to flee town, she attacks and stabs him with a glass shard just as Josh walks in. He chases and confronts Laura on the roof of the school as the police arrive. Momentarily blinded by a police searchlight that's beamed onto her, Laura loses her balance and falls off the roof, landing some distance below on another part of the building. Leaving her for dead, Josh leaves the school building and is relieved to learn that his father is alive and will recover from his stab wound. But when the police venture to the roof, they find that Laura is gone.

In the final scene, Laura/Gayle is at another high school in another state, with a new alias, applying for a job as an English teacher at the school.

== Cast ==
- Amanda Donohoe as Gayle Richards/Laura Ellington
- Dalton James as Josh Wyatt
- Natasha Gregson Wagner as Jenny
- Eugene Glazer as Ben Wyatt
- Marky Mark as Ryan Westerburg
- David Frankham as Riggs
- Christian Svensson as Dave Korczuk
- Molly Parker as Courtney
- Justine Priestley as Claire Bilino
- Gary Jones as Elliott
- Patricia Gage as Principal Beatty
- Shelley Owens as Amy Cooper
- Brigitta as Margo
- Cusse Mankuma as Bernard
- Lossen Chambers as Kim
- D. Neil Mark as Rusty
- Martin Martinuzzi as Doug Richards
- Pat Bermel as Frank
- Meredith Bain Woodward as Fran
- Sheila Patterson as Mrs. Fisher
- Katherine Banwell as Ellen Schenkle
- Glen Mauro as Twin #1
- Gary Mauro as Twin #2
- Douglas Newell as Principal
- Martin Cummins as Student (uncredited)

== Production ==
The Substitute was a pet project of producer David Kirkpatrick, who had tried for years to get it made at Paramount Pictures, during his time as president of its Motion Picture Group. According to him, the idea for the film came from Paramount chairman Brandon Tartikoff, who was looking for a new film franchise to replace the Friday the 13th series, and wanted a "psycho substitute teacher".

The film was set to be a low-budget feature, to be directed by Martin Donovan. In September 1992, it was put into turnaround less than two weeks before filming was set to begin, reportedly due to the box office failure of Pet Sematary Two, another low-budget, high-concept film that Tartikoff had approved.

Kirkpatrick later set it up as a television film for the Showtime network. Filming began in Vancouver on April 23, 1993. On April 27, the Vancouver School Board ruled that filming could not take place at Kitsilano Secondary School, which was set to portray the high school in the film, after a board member had read the script and objected to its violence and sexual content. The board relented after being convinced by the filmmakers that the draft they had seen was not the shooting script.
