= Somebody Is Waiting =

1996 film by Martin Donovan

- Directed by: Martin Donovan
- Written by: Martin Donovan
- Produced by: Natasha Doubrovskaya; Pascale Faubert
- Starring: Gabriel Byrne; Nastassja Kinski
- Cinematography: Greg Gardiner
- Edited by: John Lafferty; Sean K. Lambert; Chip Masamitsu; Frank Mazzola (director's cut)
- Music by: Elia Cmíral
- Release dates: November 11, 1996 (London Film Festival); December 19, 1996 (U.S.)
- Running time: 90 minutes
- Country: United States
- Language: English

Somebody Is Waiting is a 1996 American drama film written and directed by Martin Donovan and starring Gabriel Byrne and Nastassja Kinski.

== Plot ==
A teenager clashes with his abusive, alcoholic father as he tries to take care of his siblings after their mother is killed.

== Cast ==
- Gabriel Byrne as Roger Ellis
- Nastassja Kinski as Charlotte Ellis
- Johnny Whitworth as Leon Ellis
- Brian Donovan as Clayton
- Tyler Cole Malinger as Adlai
- Lynn Fine as Jacqueline
- Michael Malota as Kennedy
- Gary Bairos as Daniel
- Rebecca Gayheart as Lilli
- Shirley Knight as Irma Call
- Maria Daleo as Erica Macaluzzo

== Production ==
Principal photography took place around Santa Cruz, California for four weeks.

== Reception ==
Mike D'Angelo of Entertainment Weekly graded the film a D.
