= The Whole Shebang (film) =

2001 film

- Directed by: George Zaloom
- Screenplay by: George Zaloom
- Story by: Jeff Rothberg; George Zaloom
- Produced by: Nick Gillott; Paul E. Harvey; David Kirkpatrick
- Starring: Stanley Tucci; Bridget Fonda; Giancarlo Giannini
- Cinematography: Jacek Laskus
- Edited by: J. Kathleen Gibson
- Music by: Evan Lurie
- Production company: Original Voices Inc.
- Distributed by: HBO Video
- Release date: August 29, 2001
- Running time: 97 minutes
- Countries: Canada; United States
- Language: English
- Budget: $17 million

The Whole Shebang is a 2001 American-Canadian romantic comedy film written and directed by George Zaloom and starring Stanley Tucci, Bridget Fonda (in her final feature film role to date) and Giancarlo Giannini.

== Premise ==
A man (Stanley Tucci), on a mission to save his family's fireworks business, becomes distracted after he falls in love.

== Cast ==
- Stanley Tucci as Giovanni Bazinni
- Bridget Fonda as Val Bazinni
- Giancarlo Giannini as Pop Bazinni
- Talia Shire as Countess Bazinni
- Anna Maria Alberghetti as Lady Zito
- Anthony DeSando as Joey Zito
- Alexander Milani as Bobby Bazinni
- Frederico Fuoco as Anthony Zito
- John Cassini as Pater Jerry
- Jason Schombing as Ronaldo Bazinni
- Frank Ferrucci as Arturo Bazinni
- Jo Champa as Maria
- Christian Bocher as Frank Bazinni
- Maria Luisa Cianni as Andrea Martelli
