= Both Ends Meet =

- Genre: Comedy
- Starring: Dora Bryan; Ivor Dean; Wendy Richard
- Country of origin: United Kingdom
- Original language: English
- No. of series: 2
- No. of episodes: 13

Production
- Running time: 30 minutes
- Production company: London Weekend Television

Original release
- Network: ITV
- Release: 19 February – 10 November 1972

Both Ends Meet is a 1972 British sitcom television series for London Weekend Television set around women working in a sausage factory. It featured veteran actress Dora Bryan as Dora Page, a working class widow raising her son alone. The first series of seven episodes went to air as Both Ends Meet, but the second series was titled simply Dora.

The supporting cast included Deddie Davies and relative newcomer Wendy Richard.

== Series cast ==
- Dora Bryan, as Dora Page
- Ivor Dean, as factory owner Julius Cannon
- Wendy Richard, as Maudie
- Pat Ashton, as Glad
- Deddie Davies, as Flo
- Timothy Bateson, George Rogers
- Fanny Carby Hilda Rogers
- Meadows White, Mr. Page
- Paddy Ward, Fred
- Joan Benham, Mrs. Templeton-Smythe
- John Lyons Harry
- David Howe, Ronnie
- Patricia Hamilton, Miss Cornelius (guest appearances by the British actress, in real life wife of lead actor Ivor Dean)

== Episodes ==
- Firm Foundations
- Random Sample
- The Lamp Still Burns
- Party Piece
- The Spring Collection
- Come Fly with Me
- Fancy Meeting You Here
- Conversation Piece - Series 2 "Dora" Episode 1
- Dear Little Agatha Jane
- Dinner at Eight
- Get Me to the Pub on Time
- A Man About the House
- The Jet Setters
