= Dalton James =

American actor (born 1971)

- Born: March 19, 1971 (age 55); Sacramento, California, U.S.
- Occupation: Actor
- Years active: 1992–present

Dalton James (born March 19, 1971) is an American actor. He was born in Sacramento, California.

== Biography ==
Dalton played the role of Hank Bennett on Passions and the role of Mark Reese on Beverly Hills, 90210. He was also in the movie My Father the Hero. He was introduced in the last episode of MacGyver as MacGyver's long-lost son. He also played on Crossroads with Robert Urich. In 1999, he played Sunny in the movie Held Up.

== Filmography ==
Year	Title	Role	Notes
1992	Encino Man	Will, Matt's Thug #2	
1992	MacGyver	Sam Malloy	1 episode
1992	Crossroads	Dylan Hawkins	10 episodes
1993	The Substitute	Josh Wyatt	
1994	My Father the Hero	Ben	
1995	Crosstown Traffic	Brad	
1996	Beach House	Dan	
1996	Beverly Hills, 90210	Mark Reese	12 episodes
1999	Held Up	Sonny	
1999	Passions	Hank Bennett	136 episodes Dalton James was replaced by Ryan McPartlin in 2001.
2016	Thrill Kill	Larry	
