= Crossroads (1992 TV series) =

American drama television series

- Genre: Drama
- Created by: James Steven Sadwith
- Starring: Robert Urich; Dalton James
- Country of origin: United States
- Original language: English
- No. of seasons: 1
- No. of episodes: 12 (2 unaired) (list of episodes)

Production
- Executive producers: Michael Apted; Robert O'Connor
- Running time: 60 minutes
- Production companies: Finnegan/Pinchuk Productions; Lorimar Television; Osiris Films; Sadwith Productions

Original release
- Network: ABC
- Release: September 14, 1992 – July 15, 1993

Crossroads is an American drama television series created by James Steven Sadwith that aired on ABC from September 14, 1992, to July 15, 1993.

== Premise ==
A district attorney from Manhattan and his rebellious son travel around America on a motorcycle.

== Cast ==
- Robert Urich as Johnny Hawkins
- Dalton James as Dylan Hawkins
- Georgia Allen as Judge Green (pilot)

== Episodes ==
No.	Title	Directed by	Written by	Original release date
1	"Pilot"	Unknown	James Steven Sadwith	September 14, 1992
Johnny and Dylan meet a farmer who has been building a boat in his barn.
2	"Amanda"	Unknown	Unknown	September 26, 1992
A woman in a ranching community provides refuge for wolves.
3	"Song of the Open Road"	Jonathan Sanger	Paul Brown	October 3, 1992
Johnny and Dylan meet a member of a religious sect. Johnny has to decide if he wants to run for office.
4	"Miles Away from Home"	Unknown	Unknown	October 10, 1992
The duo meets a country singer.
5	"Freedom of the Road"	Unknown	Unknown	October 31, 1992
Johnny and Dylan meets a Lakota tribesman who is wanted by the FBI.
6	"Survival"	Unknown	Unknown	June 10, 1993
An ex-con with a vendetta stalks Johnny and Dylan into the wilderness.
7	"The Harvest"	Unknown	Unknown	June 17, 1993
Johnny and Dylan gets a job on a farm.
8	"The Nickel Curve"	Unknown	Unknown	July 1, 1993
Johnny's nephew is in a car accident while intoxicated.
9	"Paradise Found"	Unknown	Unknown	July 8, 1993
Johnny reunites with his first love.
10	"Cattle Drive"	Unknown	Unknown	July 15, 1993
Johnny and Dylan ride with a cowboy.
11	"First Blood"	TBD	TBD	UNAIRED
12	"All I Want for Christmas"	TBD	TBD	UNAIRED
