= Bill Lawton =

English cricketer (1920–2008)

Personal information
- Full name: William Lawton
- Born: 4 June 1920; Ashton-under-Lyne, Lancashire, England
- Died: 14 August 2008 (aged 88); Brighton, Sussex, England
- Batting: Right-handed
- Bowling: Right-arm medium

Domestic team information
- Years: Team
- 1955–1956: Cumberland
- 1948: Lancashire

Career statistics
Competition	First-class
Matches	2
Runs scored	3
Batting average	1.50
100s/50s	–/–
Top score	3
Balls bowled	126
Wickets	1
Bowling average	64.00
5 wickets in innings	–
10 wickets in match	–
Best bowling	1/0
Catches/stumpings	1/–
- Source: Cricinfo, 29 March 2011

William Lawton (4 June 1920 – 14 August 2008) was an English cricketer. Lawton was a right-handed batsman who bowled right-arm medium pace. He was born in Ashton-under-Lyne, Lancashire.

Having played for the Lancashire Second XI since 1946, he made his first-class debut for the senior Lancashire team in 1948 against the touring Australians. Lawton did not take a wicket in this match, and was dismissed for a duck by Bill Johnston in Lancashire's first-innings. His second and final first-class match came in the same season against Oxford University. In Lancashire's first-innings, Lawton scored three runs before being dismissed by Basil Robinson. His only first-class wicket came in Oxford's first-innings when he took the wicket of Philip Whitcombe. He later played for Cumberland, making his debut for the county in its first Minor Counties Championship match in 1955 against the Yorkshire Second XI. He played eight Minor Counties Championship matches for Cumberland. He also played football for a while for Oldham Athletic during the 1940s and Colwyn Bay during the 1950s. He played as a wing-half.

Lawton was married to the actress Dora Bryan, whom he met in Oldham during World War II. They were married in Werneth St Thomas, Oldham in 1954. He once co-owned Clarges Hotel on the Brighton seafront with his wife, which was used as an exterior location in the films Carry On Girls and Carry on at Your Convenience. He and his wife were forced to sell the bulk of the building as a result of bankruptcy, but they retained a flat with a sea view on the first floor for many years. Lawton died in Brighton on 14 August 2008 following a battle with Alzheimer's disease. He was survived by his wife, with whom he had three children.
