= Bridget Fonda =

American actress (born 1964)

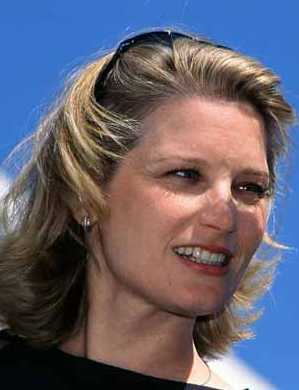
- Fonda in 2001
- Born: Bridget Jane Fonda; January 27, 1964 (age 62); Los Angeles, California, U.S.
- Education: New York University
- Occupation: Actress
- Years active: 1969; 1987–2002
- Spouse: Danny Elfman (m. 2003)
- Children: 1
- Father: Peter Fonda
- Relatives: Henry Fonda (paternal grandfather); Frances Ford Seymour (paternal grandmother); Jane Fonda (paternal aunt); Troy Garity (paternal cousin)

Bridget Jane Fonda (born January 27, 1964) is an American retired actress known for her roles in films such as The Godfather Part III (1990), Single White Female (1992), Singles (1992), Point of No Return (1993), It Could Happen to You (1994), Balto (1995), City Hall (1996), Jackie Brown (1997), A Simple Plan (1998), Lake Placid (1999), and Kiss of the Dragon (2001). She was nominated for the Golden Globe Award for Best Supporting Actress for her portrayal of Mandy Rice-Davies in Scandal (1989), and received Primetime Emmy and Golden Globe nominations for the television films In the Gloaming (1997) and No Ordinary Baby (2001). Fonda retired from acting in 2002.

Fonda is the daughter of Peter Fonda, niece of Jane Fonda, and granddaughter of Henry Fonda. She is married to composer Danny Elfman, with whom she has a son.

== Early life ==
Fonda was born on January 27, 1964, in Los Angeles, California, to a family of actors, including her grandfather Henry Fonda, father Peter Fonda, and her aunt Jane Fonda. Her mother, Susan Jane Brewer, is an artist. Fonda is named after actress Margaret Sullavan's daughter Bridget Hayward. Her maternal grandmother, Mary Sweet, married businessman Noah Dietrich.

Fonda's parents divorced in 1974, and the next year, her father Peter married Portia Rebecca Crockett (former wife of author Thomas McGuane). Crockett raised Fonda, her brother Justin, and older stepbrother Thomas McGuane Jr. in the Coldwater Canyon section of Los Angeles, as well as in Paradise Valley, south of Livingston, Montana.

Fonda studied drama at New York University.

== Career ==
Fonda became involved with the theater when she was cast in a school production of Harvey. She studied method acting at the Lee Strasberg Theatre Institute as part of New York University's Tisch School of the Arts acting program and graduated from NYU in 1986.

She made her movie debut at age five (filmed at age four) in Easy Rider (1969) as a child in the hippie commune that Peter Fonda and Dennis Hopper visit on their trek across the United States. Her second (non-speaking) part was in the 1982 comedy Partners. In 1988, she got her first substantial film role in Scandal, and appeared in You Can't Hurry Love and Shag (both 1988).

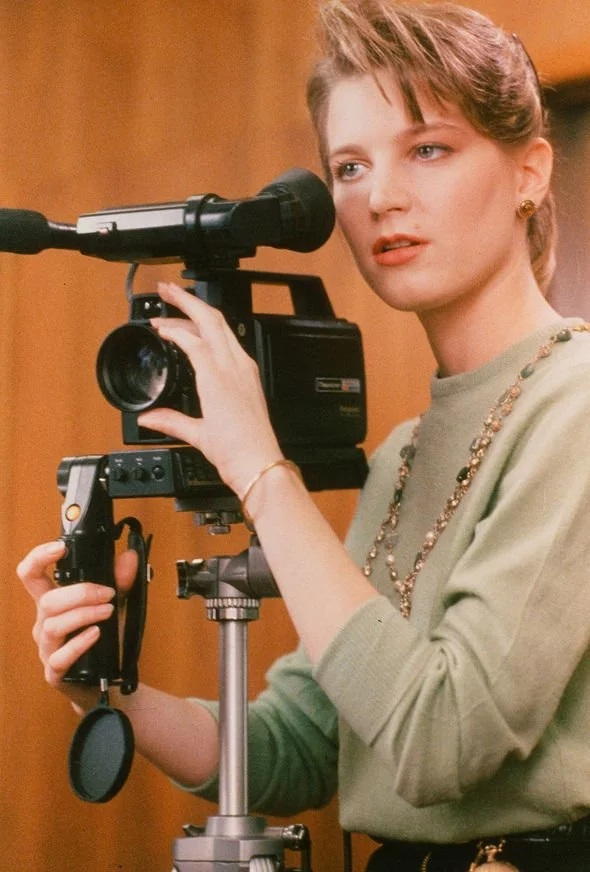
Fonda in You Can't Hurry Love (1988)

Her breakthrough role was as a journalist in The Godfather Part III, released in late 1990. After gaining additional work experience in a few theater productions, she appeared in the comedy Doc Hollywood (1991), and was cast as the lead in Barbet Schroeder's Single White Female, followed by a role in Cameron Crowe's ensemble comedy Singles (both 1992).

Fonda starred in 1993's Point of No Return, an American remake of the 1990 French film Nikita. A review in The New Yorker cited her "provocative, taunting assertiveness". In 1994, she was in the poorly received comedy The Road to Wellville, and she starred alongside Nicolas Cage in the romantic comedy It Could Happen to You. She followed up with roles in the animated film Balto (1995) and the political thriller City Hall (1996). In 1997, she was on the same flight as Quentin Tarantino when he offered her the part of Melanie in Jackie Brown. She starred in A Simple Plan (1998) and Lake Placid (1999), and was also reportedly offered the titular leading role in the television series Ally McBeal, but turned it down to concentrate on her film career.

Fonda received Primetime Emmy and Golden Globe nominations for the television films In the Gloaming (1997) and No Ordinary Baby (2001).

In 2001, Fonda starred with Jet Li in the action thriller film Kiss of the Dragon. Her final film role was in the 2001 movie The Whole Shebang. Her final role overall was the title role in the TV movie Snow Queen in 2002, and she has not appeared on screen since.

== Personal life ==
Fonda met actor Eric Stoltz in 1986 and they began dating in 1990. They ended their relationship in 1998.

In February 2003, Fonda suffered a serious injury from a car crash that fractured a vertebra. The following month, she became engaged to film composer and former Oingo Boingo frontman Danny Elfman, and they married in November 2003. In 2005, they had a son together. After her engagement to Elfman, Fonda withdrew from acting, and concentrated on her family life.

== Filmography ==
=== Film ===
Film work by Bridget Fonda
Year	Title	Role	Notes
1969	Easy Rider	Child in Commune	Uncredited
1987	Aria	Lover	Segment: "Liebestod"
1988	You Can't Hurry Love	Peggy Kellogg	
1988	Shag	Melaina	
1988	Gandahar	Head / Historian	Voice dub; English version
1989	Scandal	Mandy Rice-Davies	
1989	Strapless	Amy Hempel	
1990	Frankenstein Unbound	Mary Wollstonecraft Godwin	
1990	The Godfather Part III	Grace Hamilton	
1991	Iron Maze	Chris Sugita	
1991	Drop Dead Fred	Annabella	Uncredited
1991	Out of the Rain	Jo	
1991	Doc Hollywood	Nancy Lee Nicholson	
1992	Leather Jackets	Claudi	
1992	Single White Female	Allison Jones	
1992	Singles	Janet Livermore	
1992	Army of Darkness	Linda	Cameo appearance
1993	Bodies, Rest & Motion	Beth	
1993	Point of No Return	Maggie Hayward / Claudia Anne Doran / Nina	Also known as The Assassin
1993	Little Buddha	Lisa Conrad	
1994	It Could Happen to You	Yvonne Biasi	
1994	The Road to Wellville	Eleanor Lightbody	
1994	Camilla	Freda Lopez	
1995	Rough Magic	Myra Shumway	
1995	Balto	Jenna	Voice role
1996	City Hall	Marybeth Cogan	
1996	Grace of My Heart	Kelly Porter	
1997	Touch	Lynn Marie Faulkner	
1997	Mr. Jealousy	Irene	
1997	Jackie Brown	Melanie Ralston	
1998	Break Up	Jimmy Dade	
1998	Finding Graceland	Ashley	
1998	A Simple Plan	Sarah Mitchell	
1999	Lake Placid	Kelly Scott	
2000	South of Heaven, West of Hell	Adalyne Dunfries	
2001	Delivering Milo	Elizabeth	
2001	Monkeybone	Dr. Julie McElroy	
2001	Kiss of the Dragon	Jessica Kamen	
2001	The Whole Shebang	Val Bazinni	
2019	QT8: The First Eight	Melanie Ralston	Documentary film; Archival footage from Jackie Brown

=== Television ===
Television work by Bridget Fonda
Year	Title	Role	Notes
1989	Jacob Have I Loved	Louise Bradshaw	Television film
1989	21 Jump Street	Molly "Moho" Chapman	Episode: "Blinded by the Thousand Points of Light"
1997	In the Gloaming	Anne	Television film
1998	Bravo Profiles: The Entertainment Business	Herself	Episode: "Late Night Talk"
1998	The Larry Sanders Show	Bridget Fonda	Episode: "Pilots and Pens Lost"
2001	Night Visions	Mary	Episode: "The Occupant"
2001	No Ordinary Baby	Linda Sanclair	Television film
2002	The Chris Isaak Show	Stephanie Furst	4 episodes
2002	Snow Queen	Snow Queen	Television film

== Awards and nominations ==
=== Awards ===
- 1995: Sitges Film Festival Best actress for Rough Magic

=== Nominations ===
- 1990: Independent Spirit Award for Best Supporting Female for Shag
- 1990: Golden Globe Award for Best Supporting Actress in a Motion Picture for Scandal
- 1997: Primetime Emmy Award for Outstanding Supporting Actress in a Miniseries or a Movie for In the Gloaming
- 1999: Blockbuster Entertainment Awards Favorite Actress - Suspense for A Simple Plan
- 2002: Golden Globe Award for Best Performance by an Actress In A Mini-series or Motion Picture Made for Television for No Ordinary Baby (also known as After Amy)
