= Mad at the Moon =

1992 film

- Video release poster
- Directed by: Martin Donovan
- Written by: Martin Donovan; Richard Pelusi
- Produced by: Matt Devlen; Cassian Elwes; Michael Kastenbaum
- Starring: Mary Stuart Masterson; Hart Bochner; Fionnula Flanagan; Stephen Blake
- Cinematography: Rohn Schmidt
- Edited by: Penelope Shaw
- Music by: Gerald Gouriet
- Distributed by: Republic Pictures Home Video
- Release date: May 1992
- Running time: 98 minutes
- Country: United States
- Language: English

Mad at the Moon is a 1992 American Western-romantic horror film co-written and directed by Martin Donovan. It stars Mary Stuart Masterson, Hart Bochner and Fionnula Flanagan.

== Synopsis ==
In 1892, Jenny Hill (Masterson), a young woman living on the frontier, is infatuated with Miller Brown, the local outlaw. However, her mother (Flanagan) strongly disapproves and marries her off to Miller's half-brother, James Miller, who is an apparently meek farmer. James Miller loves Jenny, but his love is not reciprocated by her. Eventually, Jenny discovers James' hidden secret of being a werewolf, and asks for Miller Brown's help to protect her from his half-brother.

== Cast ==
- Mary Stuart Masterson as Jenny Hill
- Hart Bochner as Miller Brown
- Fionnula Flanagan as Mrs. Hill
- Stephen Blake as James Miller
- Cec Verrell as Sally
- Daphne Zuniga as Young Mrs. Miller
- Eleanor Baggett as Older Mrs. Miller
- Pat Atkins as Mrs. Russell
- Morgan Stuart as Young Jenny
- Ryan Slater as Young James
- Jonathan Tripp as Opera Singer
- Janet Momjian as Opera Singer
- Raymond De Felitta as Piano Player
- Jacqueline Stansbury as Saloon Girl (as Jackie Stansbury)
- Alix Koromzay as Saloon Girl
- Kathy Messick as Saloon Girl
- Melissa Moore as Miss Saunders (as Melissa Anne Moore)
- Stephen Cole as Priest

== Release ==
Mad at the Moon screened at the 18th Seattle International Film Festival in 1992. The festival ran from May 14 to June 7, 1992, and SIFF's archive lists the film among the feature-length films presented that year. VideoHound's Golden Movie Retriever listed the film as a 98-minute VHS title.

== Reception ==
Mad at the Moon received mixed to negative reviews from critics upon its release.

Derek Elley of Variety criticized the film, stating, "A bad attack of miscasting and some klutzy development take[s] the shine out of Mad at the Moon... Slimly plotted item may attract the midnight crowd at specialized outings but is unlikely to raise much of a howl with mainstream audiences."

TV Guide awarded the film a mixed two out of five stars, commending the film's ambiance, and cinematography; while criticizing the film's underdeveloped plot, minimal character development, and abrupt ending. Fred Beldin from Allmovie gave the film a more positive review, commending the film's cast, cinematography, and soundtrack, writing "While horror and Western fans won't have much patience with this deliberately paced romantic drama, Mad at the Moon is a unique meld of genre influences that succeeds on its own terms."

Bobby Lisse on Morbidly Beautiful simplifies the movie as, 'A sophomoric plot does its best to drag down a beautifully shot film'.

Another film reviewer on Letterboxd rates the movie 2 out of 5 stars stating, "Not an essential part of the horror wester/weird western canon and totally skippable."
