= Apartment Zero =

1988 film by Martin Donovan

- Theatrical release poster
- Directed by: Martin Donovan
- Screenplay by: Martin Donovan; David Koepp
- Story by: Martin Donovan
- Produced by: Martin Donovan; David Koepp
- Starring: Hart Bochner; Colin Firth; Dora Bryan; Liz Smith; Fabrizio Bentivoglio
- Cinematography: Miguel Rodríguez
- Edited by: Conrad M. Gonzalez
- Music by: Elia Cmíral
- Production companies: Producers Representative Organization; The Summit Company
- Distributed by: Mainline Pictures (United Kingdom)
- Release dates: October 1988 (New York); 15 September 1989 (UK)
- Running time: 124 minutes (theatrical release & 2007 DVD release); 116 minutes (TV Version)
- Country: United Kingdom
- Languages: English; Spanish
- Box office: $1,267,578

Apartment Zero, also known as Conviviendo con la muerte (Spanish for Living with Death), is a 1988 British psychological-political thriller film directed by Martin Donovan, co-written by Donovan and David Koepp and starring Hart Bochner and Colin Firth. It was produced in 1988 and premiered at film festivals throughout the next year. The story is set in a rundown area of Buenos Aires at the dawn of the 1980s, where Adrian LeDuc becomes friends with Jack Carney, an American expatriate who rents a room from him. Gradually, Adrian begins to suspect that the outwardly likeable Jack is responsible for a series of political assassinations that are rocking the city.

Suffused with homoerotic overtones and moments of black comedy, it received mixed-to-positive reviews at the time of its release, and currently has a Rotten Tomatoes score of 75% positive reactions from both critics and viewers.

== Plot ==
Adrian LeDuc is the British owner of a revival house in Buenos Aires. Apart from his mother, the core of his emotional life is movies, specifically classic American movies and stars. The story begins with Adrian in his theater, watching the final scene of Touch of Evil.

As his theater loses more and more money, Adrian advertises for a roommate to share his apartment rent. After several unsatisfactory applicants, he meets American Jack Carney, who agrees to take the room. The shy, repressed Adrian is both intimidated by and attracted to Jack, who exudes confidence and strength, and attempts to win Jack's trust and companionship. Jack seems to suspect this and doesn't mind, and he takes a liking to his new landlord.

Jack befriends some of the neighbors. Adrian complains to Jack, telling him that the neighbors aren't to be trusted. Despite Adrian's jealousy, Jack continues to socialize with several of them, becoming sexually involved with Laura, whose husband is frequently away. Claudia, the ticket seller at Adrian's cinema, is involved with a political committee investigating a series of murders that bear a striking resemblance to those committed by members of death squads that operated in Argentina during its last civil-military dictatorship (1976–1983).

Adrian learns that Jack has been lying about his employment and becomes paranoid that Jack is spying on him. He searches Jack's room and finds a number of photographs of Jack in paramilitary garb. Jack returns and calms a highly agitated Adrian, but his own suspicions are aroused when he realizes that Adrian has been in his room.

Though he's personally apolitical, Adrian allows Claudia's committee to use his theatre to view footage of death squad members. Adrian is horrified to see the same sign in the film as appeared in some of the photos of Jack he'd found earlier. Jack, realizing that Adrian is growing more suspicious, falsifies Adrian's passport and prepares to leave Argentina. Unfortunately, the passport is expired and he can't leave. Jack picks up a young gay man and murders him for his passport—but then makes a hash of trying to paste his own photos into the dead man's passport.

Meanwhile, Adrian is devastated by the death of his mother. Adrian gets drunk and creates a disturbance in his apartment, concerning his neighbors. The following morning a television report of the murder of a young man leads the neighbors to think that Adrian has done something to Jack. That evening, the neighbors confront Adrian, forcing their way into his apartment and physically attacking him. Jack returns and tends to the badly injured Adrian.

As Adrian attends his mother's funeral, Claudia comes to the apartment and recognizes Jack from the death squad photos. Adrian returns to find Claudia dead at Jack's hands. A clearly unhinged Adrian, who is as terrified of losing Jack as he is horrified by Claudia's murder, helps Jack dispose of the body. On the way out they run into Laura and her husband. Looking for an alibi, Jack says he's leaving for California in the morning.

After they dump the body in a garbage landfill outside the city, Adrian suggests they really go to California together and Jack agrees. Back at the apartment Adrian changes his mind and goes for Jack's gun in the living room. Jack realizes what's happening and begins strangling Adrian, but eventually lets him up. Adrian again goes for the gun and he and Jack struggle. With the gun pointed at him and with Adrian's finger on the trigger, Jack says "Do it" and the gun goes off.

Some days after, Adrian is having dinner when Laura comes to the door, seeking Jack's address in California. Adrian says he hasn't heard from him and shuts the door. He returns to the table and pours two glasses of wine, one for himself and one for Jack's corpse, which he has kept and sat at the table. The final scene shows a large crowd outside Adrian's cinema, which is now a porn theater. Adrian, who has never gone out in public without a suit and tie, stands in the building's doorway wearing a T-shirt and Jack's black leather jacket, while smoking a cigarette—all just as Jack used to do.

== Cast ==
- Hart Bochner – Jack Carney
- Colin Firth – Adrian LeDuc
- Dora Bryan – Margaret McKinney
- Liz Smith – Mary Louise McKinney
- Fabrizio Bentivoglio – Carlos Sanchez-Verne
- James Telfer – Vanessa
- Mirella D'Angelo – Laura Werpachowsky
- Juan Vitali – Alberto Werpachowsky
- Cipe Lincovsky – Mrs. Treniev
- Francesca d'Aloja – Claudia
- Miguel Ligero – Mr. Palma
- Elvia Andreoli – Adrian's Mother
- Marikena Monti – Tango Singer
- Luis Romero – Projectionist
- Max Berliner – Prospective Tenant
- Debora Bianco – Girl in Cafe
- Federico D'Elía – Boy in Cafe
- Raúl Florido – Jack's Argentine Contact
- Claudio Ciacci – Young Man in Cinema
- Gabriel Posniak – Dead Man
- Darwin Sanchez – Police Inspector
- Daniel Queirolo – Young Cop
- Miguel Ángel Porro – Taxi Driver
- Ezequiel Donovan – Foreign Element
- Eduardo Peralta Ramos – Foreign Element
- John Kamps – Foreign Element
- Göran Johansson – Foreign Element
- Lisanne Cole – Political Group in Cinema
- Germán Palacios – Member of Political Group in Cinema
- Horacio Erman – Political Group in Cinema
- Inés Estévez – Political Group in Cinema
- Gabriel Corrado – Victim in Apartment

== Themes ==
The doppelgänger or double is a recurring motif of Apartment Zero. Adrian and Jack bear some physical resemblance (which Jack planned to exploit to escape the country), as do Jack and the murdered gay man. A character comments that Jack is a double of someone from his past. By the film's end, instead of Jack becoming Adrian, Adrian instead has become Jack.

Another motif is classic films, especially films which have some connection to gay culture. Adrian runs a revival house. He and Jack play a movie trivia game together frequently. Adrian's apartment is decorated with framed portraits of movie stars, including a number who were, or are perceived as being, gay or bisexual (including James Dean and Montgomery Clift). Adrian's choice of films also reflects a gay interest, including a Dean film festival and Compulsion, based on the Leopold and Loeb murder case.

=== Historical and political context ===
The setting of the film ties its characters to the political situation in Argentina in the early 1980s. The main events transpire shortly after the end of Argentina's last civil-military dictatorship (1976–1983); the regime (self-titled as National Reorganization Process) imposed a political climate of state-sponsored terrorism, and the period was marred by widespread human rights violations. The state-sponsored terrorism of the military Junta created a climate of violence whose victims were in the thousands and included left-wing activists and militants, intellectuals and artists, trade unionists, High School and College/University students and journalists, as well as Marxists, Peronist guerrillas or alleged sympathizers of both.

Although in the period there was leftist violence involved, mostly by the Montoneros guerrilla, most of the victims were unarmed non-combatants, and the guerrillas were exterminated by 1979, while the dictatorship carried out its crimes until the exit from power. After the defeat in the Falklands War, the Junta called for elections in 1983. The National Commission on the Disappearance of Persons originally estimated that around 13,000 individuals were disappeared. Present estimates for the number of people who were killed or disappeared range from 9,089 to over 30,000; The military themselves reported killing 22,000 people in a 1978 communication to Chilean Intelligence, and the Mothers and Grandmothers of the Plaza de Mayo, which are the most important Human-Rights Organisations in Argentina, have always jointly maintained that the number of disappeared is unequivocally 30,000. Since 1983 Argentina has maintained democracy as its ruling system.

== Reception ==
=== Reviews ===
On the review aggregator website Rotten Tomatoes, 74% of 31 critics' reviews are positive, with an average rating of 6.7/10. The website's consensus reads: "Despite some underserved and overwrought thematic elements, Apartment Zero emerges as a compellingly eerie thriller with strong lead performances and a stylish, neo-noir mood."

Critics were sharply divided on the film. Many of the reviews were negative, although the performances of Bochner and particularly Firth were widely praised.

Vincent Canby of The New York Times called the film "hilariously awful", and stated, "A good deal of money has been spent on this nonsense, which was shot in Buenos Aires in English. It pretends to be a psychological-political melodrama but plays like the work of a dilettante; that is, the work of someone who wants to make movies, has the means to make them, but doesn't, as yet, know what he wants to make them about." Writing for the Chicago Tribune, Dave Kehr called the film "A definite oddity, though not an entirely compelling one ... turns what might have been a modestly successful psychological thriller into a messily failed art film." Kevin Thomas's review in the Los Angeles Times led with "Zero Doesn't Add Up as a Thriller", adding "Nothing...makes much sense right from the start. Unfortunately, the long-winded Apartment Zero is awkward to the point of ludicrousness."

=== Awards and nominations ===
- Cognac Festival du Film Policier Critics Award winner and Special Jury Prize – Martin Donovan (1990)
- Seattle International Film Festival Golden Space Needle Award for Best Film (1989)
- Sundance Film Festival Grand Jury Prize (Dramatic) nomination (1989)
