= Break Up (1998 film) =

1998 crime thriller film by Paul Marcus

- Directed by: Paul Marcus
- Screenplay by: Anne Amanda Opotowsky
- Produced by: Jonas Goodman
- Starring: Bridget Fonda; Kiefer Sutherland; Steven Weber; Hart Bochner
- Cinematography: Hubert Taczanowski
- Edited by: Arthur Coburn
- Music by: Laura Karpman
- Production companies: Front Street Pictures; Millennium Films
- Distributed by: Dimension Films
- Release date: August 21, 1998
- Running time: 100 minutes
- Country: United States
- Language: English

Break Up is a 1998 American crime thriller film directed by Paul Marcus and written by Anne Amanda Opotowsky. It stars Bridget Fonda, Kiefer Sutherland, Hart Bochner, and Steven Weber. it was released direct-to-video.

== Plot ==
After blacking out in a violent domestic battle, Jimmy awakens in the hospital to learn that her abusive husband, Frank, has died in a fiery crash, and that she is the prime suspect. As the police focus on building their case against Jimmy, she uncovers evidence indicating that Frank may not only still be alive, but getting away with murder. Jimmy, in a daring escape from police custody, races towards a final confrontation with justice and revenge.

== Cast ==
- Bridget Fonda as Jimmy Dade
- Kiefer Sutherland as Officer John Box
- Steven Weber as Officer Andrew Ramsey
- Hart Bochner as Frankie Dade
- Penelope Ann Miller as Grace
- Tippi Hedren as Mom
- Leslie Stefanson as Shelly
- Joe Spano as Priest

== Production ==
The screenplay for Break Up was written by Anne Amanda Opotowsky and developed for Millennium Films by producers Jonas Goodman and Harvey Kahn. The film was produced by Goodman, Kahn, and Elie Samaha, with Avi Lerner, Danny Dimbort, and Trevor Short serving as executive producers.

Break Up was an early project of Millennium Films, which had been established in early 1996 by Nu Image in partnership with Samaha. It was intended to focus on higher-end films, distinct from Nu Image's previous low-budget, direct-to-video output.

In August 1997, Disney-subsidiary Miramax Films announced its acquisition of distribution rights for Break Up in the United States, United Kingdom, and Australia, marking the first project under a newly formed co-production and distribution agreement with Nu Image and Millennium Films. Principal photography took place in Bakersfield and Taft, California during late 1997, shortly after it was announced Miramax had acquired distribution rights. Prior to the announcement of Miramax's distribution rights, Kiefer Sutherland and Bridget Fonda still hadn't signed up for the project. Fonda had recently completed a role in the Miramax film Jackie Brown, which was shot between May and August 1997, and in post-production until its eventual December 1997 release. Miramax released Break Up through their genre specialty label Dimension Films, which released films firmly fitting within genres such as horror, action and comedy. The pact with Nu Image/Millennium, described as a first-look arrangement, allowed for up to four co-productions annually, with Miramax handling distribution in domestic markets and all English-speaking territories except South Africa. Nu Image retained responsibility for foreign sales outside these regions. The pact was negotiated by Miramax's Andrew Herwitz, senior vice president of acquisitions and business affairs, and Michael Cole, vice president of acquisitions and strategic planning, with Lerner representing Nu Image and Millennium.

This agreement followed Nu Image's prior distribution relationship with October Films during 1995 and 1996. Under October Films, most of Nu Image's content primarily went through non-theatrical channels in North America such as pay television via HBO and home video via Hallmark Home Entertainment. That agreement, overseen by former October executive Amir Malin, expired in 1997 amid personnel changes, including Malin's departure and the arrival of Scott Greenstein, coinciding with Universal Studios' acquisition of a majority stake in October. The shift to Miramax was seen as potentially bolstering the latter's genre-focused Dimension Films division. Miramax co-chairman Harvey Weinstein expressed enthusiasm for the partnership in August 1997, highlighting the combination of Miramax's development resources with Nu Image's cost-effective production capabilities. Lerner, on behalf of Nu Image and Millennium, described the deal as a significant advancement for their operations, aligning their foreign sales strengths with Miramax's creative and domestic distribution expertise.

== Reception ==
The film received negative reviews. Nathan Rabin of The A.V. Club called it "tawdry, exploitative, and lacking common sense and suspense". TV Guide wrote, "A touch of Sleeping with the Enemy here, a dash of Double Jeopardy there... there's nothing especially original going on here, but Fonda delivers a nice, subdued performance as the battered Jimmy".

== Home media ==
The film received an Italian theatrical release in August 1998, before going direct-to-video in other European countries later that year. In the United States, the film was initially released on VHS and DVD in 1999 by Buena Vista Home Entertainment (under the Dimension Home Video banner). In Australia, it was released on VHS in 2001, also by Buena Vista Home Entertainment.

In 2012, Lionsgate Home Entertainment reissued Break Up on DVD in the United States.

Since April 2020, the film has been distributed on digital platforms by Paramount Pictures.

== See also ==
- List of films featuring the deaf and hard of hearing
