= The Contact (1963 film) =

- Directed by: Philip Wrestler
- Screenplay by: Philip Wrestler
- Produced by: Lawrence G. Knight
- Starring: John Hurt; Pauline Collins; Wendy Richard
- Production company: Senaca Films
- Release date: 1963
- Running time: 12 minutes
- Country: United Kingdom
- Language: English

The Contact is a 1963 British educational short film written and directed by Philip Wrestler and starring John Hurt and Pauline Collins.

The film was sponsored by the Spastics Society and was designed to educate young people against prejudice to disabled people. It was shot at Thomas Delarue School.

== Plot ==
Max is a physically disabled teenager with cerebral palsy. After being knocked to the ground by teenage boys on motorbikes, they take him to a youth club. There the boys and their friends realise that, apart from walking, Max is no different from them.

== Cast ==
- John Hurt as Max
- Pauline Collins
- Georgina Patterson
- Wendy Richard as Joyce
- Rodney Goodall
- Hugh Halliday
- Graham Harper
- The Impacts as themselves

== Reception ==
The British Film Institute wrote: "The Contact is a remarkably forward-looking attempt to show disabled young people as deserving of inclusion and acceptance in mainstream society. Look carefully and you’ll spot a young Pauline Collins and Wendy Richards [sic] doing the Twist."
