= Held Up =

1999 comedy film directed by Steve Rash

- Theatrical release poster
- Directed by: Steve Rash
- Screenplay by: Jeff Eastin
- Story by: Jeff Eastin; Erik Fleming
- Produced by: Neal H. Moritz; Jonathon Komack Martin; Stokely Chaffin
- Starring: Jamie Foxx; Nia Long; Barry Corbin; Eduardo Yáñez; John Cullum; Sarah Paulson; Dalton James; Jake Busey
- Cinematography: David A. Makin
- Edited by: Jonathan Chibnall
- Music by: Robert Folk
- Production companies: Minds Eye Entertainment; Original Film
- Distributed by: Trimark Pictures
- Release dates: October 8, 1999 (Memphis, Tennessee); May 12, 2000 (United States)
- Running time: 89 minutes
- Language: English
- Budget: $8 million
- Box office: $4 million

Held Up is a 1999 American crime buddy comedy film starring Nia Long and Jamie Foxx and directed by Steve Rash.

== Plot ==
While on a road trip in the Southwest, Rae (Long) discovers that her man, Michael (Foxx), spent the $15,000 they set aside for a home on a vintage Studebaker. Rae promptly dumps Michael at a convenience store and hops a ride to the airport. Soon after, Michael loses the car when a young kid cons him out of the keys.

Michael soon finds his day going from bad to worse when he's caught up in a botched robbery at the convenience store where he's now stranded. The cops (local vigilantes) show up ready for a gunfight. Michael finds himself trying to convince the gunman (Yáñez) to let him and the other hostages go, all while trying to plan how to get to the airport before Rae's flight leaves.

== Cast ==
- Jamie Foxx as Michael Dawson
- Nia Long as Rae Swanson
- Barry Corbin as Pembry
- Eduardo Yáñez as Rodrigo
- John Cullum as Jack
- Dalton James as Sunny
- Roselyn Sanchez as Trina
- Sarah Paulson as Mary
- Jake Busey as Deputy Rick Beaumont
- Julie Hagerty as Gloria
- Natalia Cigliuti as Wilma
- Herta Ware as Alice
- Andrew Jackson as Billy
- Sam Gifaldi as Rusty
- Diego Fuentes as Sal
- Sam Vlahos as Jose
- Billy Morton as Delbert
- Harper Roisman as Howard
- Gary Owen as Clute
- Chris Scott as Gladys
- Tim Dixon as Leon
- Gerry Quigley as Horace
- Michael Shamus Wiles as Biker
- Kathryn Winslow as Pilot
- Tim Loewen as an extra, seen in his red undies

== Reception ==
On the review aggregator website Rotten Tomatoes, 17% of 29 critics' reviews are positive, with an average rating of 3.5/10. The website's consensus reads: "Lackluster performances and fluff humor can't keep this wreck from sinking." Metacritic, which uses a weighted average, assigned the film a score of 21 out of 100, based on 17 critics, indicating "generally unfavorable" reviews.

== Soundtrack ==
A soundtrack containing hip hop music was released on March 14, 2000, by Spot Music.
