= Death Becomes Her =

1992 film by Robert Zemeckis

- Theatrical release poster
- Directed by: Robert Zemeckis
- Written by: Martin Donovan; David Koepp
- Produced by: Robert Zemeckis; Steve Starkey
- Starring: Meryl Streep; Bruce Willis; Goldie Hawn; Isabella Rossellini
- Cinematography: Dean Cundey
- Edited by: Arthur Schmidt
- Music by: Alan Silvestri
- Production company: South Side Amusement Company
- Distributed by: Universal Pictures
- Release date: July 31, 1992
- Running time: 104 minutes
- Country: United States
- Language: English
- Budget: $55 million
- Box office: $149 million

Death Becomes Her is a 1992 American surrealist black comedy fantasy film directed and produced by Robert Zemeckis, written by David Koepp and Martin Donovan, and starring Meryl Streep, Bruce Willis, Goldie Hawn, and Isabella Rossellini. Filmed in Los Angeles between December 1991 and April 1992, it follows two women who drink a magic potion that promises eternal youth.

Upon release in the United States by Universal Pictures on July 31, 1992, the film received mixed reviews from critics. Its pioneering usage of computer-generated effects helped it win the Academy Award for Best Visual Effects. The film is regarded as a cult classic and a highly treasured film within the gay community. It has since been adapted into a critically acclaimed Tony Award-winning Broadway musical.

== Plot ==
In 1978, aging and fading actress Madeline Ashton performs in a poorly received Broadway musical. She invites long-time friend and rival, meek aspiring writer Helen Sharp, backstage along with Helen's fiancé, plastic surgeon Ernest Menville. Smitten with Madeline, Ernest breaks off his engagement with Helen to marry Madeline. Seven years later, Helen—now obese, depressed, and impoverished—is committed to a psychiatric hospital where she swears revenge on Madeline.

Another seven years later, Madeline and Ernest live an opulent but miserable life in Beverly Hills: Madeline is depressed about her withering beauty and career, and Ernest has become an alcoholic, reduced to working as a reconstructive mortician. After receiving an invitation to a party celebrating Helen's new book, Madeline rushes for beauty treatments. Desperate to look younger, she is given the business card of Lisle Von Rhuman, a mysterious socialite who specializes in rejuvenation.

At the party, Madeline and Ernest discover that Helen is now slim, glamorous, and youthful, despite being 50. Overcome with envy, Madeline visits her younger lover but discovers he is with a woman his own age. Despondent, she visits Lisle's mansion. The youthful Lisle— who claims to be 71—offers Madeline a potion that promises eternal life and youth. Madeline drinks the potion, which restores her to her physical prime. Meanwhile, Helen seduces Ernest and persuades him to kill Madeline.

After returning home, Madeline belittles Ernest, who snaps and pushes her down the stairs, breaking her neck. However, she inexplicably survives and Ernest takes her to the hospital, where she is deemed to be clinically dead. Ernest considers her reanimation to be a miracle and repairs her body at home. When Helen arrives and secretly tries to discuss her plan with Ernest to murder Madeline, Madeline shoots Helen with a shotgun. The blast leaves a large hole in Helen's torso but she remains alive, revealing that she has also taken Lisle's potion. Helen and Madeline fight before reconciling. Depressed at the reality of their situation, Ernest prepares to leave, but Helen and Madeline persuade him to repair their bodies first. Realizing they will need regular maintenance, they scheme to have Ernest drink the potion to ensure his permanent availability.

The pair forcibly bring him to Lisle, who offers him the potion in exchange for his surgical skills. Ernest rejects immortality, afraid of being forced to spend eternity with Madeline and Helen and enduring the same physical damage the pair has already suffered. He flees with the potion but becomes trapped on the roof. Helen and Madeline implore Ernest to drink the potion to survive an impending fall, but he throws it away before surviving the fall by landing in Lisle's pool and escaping, leaving the pair in despair as they realize they must depend on each other for companionship and maintenance—forever.

Thirty-seven years later, Madeline and Helen attend Ernest's funeral, where he is eulogized as having achieved true immortality by living an adventurous and fulfilling life and ending up with a large family after meeting his second wife, Claire, at age 50. Now grotesque parodies of their former selves, with peeling paint and putty covering most of their grey, cadaverous flesh, Helen and Madeline mock the eulogy and leave. Outside, Helen trips and falls down a flight of steps, dragging Madeline with her. Their bodies break apart, leaving them as disembodied heads, and Helen sardonically asks Madeline if she remembers where they parked their car.

== Cast ==
- Meryl Streep as Madeline Ashton
- Goldie Hawn as Helen Sharp
- Bruce Willis as Dr. Ernest Menville
- Isabella Rossellini as Lisle von Rhuman
- Ian Ogilvy as Chagall
- Adam Storke as Dakota Williams
- Alaina Reed Hall as Psychologist
- Michelle Johnson as Anna Jones
- Mary Ellen Trainor as Vivian Adams
- Nancy Fish as Rose
- Susan Kellermann as second ER doctor
- William Frankfather as Mr. Roy Franklin
- John Ingle as Eulogist
- Debra Jo Rupp as Patient
- Fabio as Lisle's bodyguard
- Danny Lee "Nitro" Clark as Lisle's bodyguard
- Sydney Pollack as Dr. Harris (uncredited)

== Production ==
=== Casting ===
Kevin Kline was the first choice to play Dr. Ernest Menville, but he fell out of the project due to a pay dispute with the studio. Jeff Bridges and Nick Nolte were both considered before Bruce Willis was eventually cast.

=== Filming ===
Principal photography for Death Becomes Her began on December 9, 1991, and wrapped up on April 7, 1992. The film was shot entirely in Los Angeles, and featured several locations frequently used in film and television, including the Greystone Mansion (Ernest's funeral home) and the Ebell of Los Angeles (Helen's book party). The exterior of Madeline and Ernest's mansion is located at 1125 Oak Grove Avenue in San Marino, but the interior was a set built on a soundstage. The ending scene where Helen and Madeline tumble down a set of stairs outside a chapel was filmed at Mount St. Mary's University in Brentwood.

=== Visual effects ===
Death Becomes Her was a technologically complex film to make, and represented a major advancement in the use of computer generated imagery (CGI) effects, under the direction of Industrial Light and Magic. It was the first film where CGI skin texture was used, in the shot where Madeline resets her neck after her head is smashed with a shovel by Helen. Creating the sequences where Madeline's head is dislocated and facing the wrong way around involved a combination of chroma key, an animatronic model created by Amalgamated Dynamics, and prosthetic make-up effects on Meryl Streep to create the look of a twisted neck.

The digital advancements pioneered on Death Becomes Her were incorporated into Industrial Light and Magic's next project, Jurassic Park, released by Universal only a year later. The two films also shared cinematographer Dean Cundey and production designer Rick Carter.

The production had a fair number of mishaps. In the scene where Helen and Madeline are battling with shovels, Meryl Streep accidentally cut Goldie Hawn's face, leaving a faint scar. Streep admitted that she disliked working on a project that focused so heavily on special effects and vowed never to work on another film with heavy special effects again, saying:

My first, my last, my only. I think it's tedious. Whatever concentration you can apply to that kind of comedy is just shredded. You stand there like a piece of machinery—they should get machinery to do it. I loved how it turned out. But it's not fun to act to a lampstand. "Pretend this is Goldie, right here! Uh, no, I'm sorry, Bob, she went off the mark by five centimeters, and now her head won't match her neck!" It was like being at the dentist.

=== Post-production ===
Several scenes were filmed but omitted from the film's final cut. Director Robert Zemeckis decided on cutting the scenes to accelerate the film's pacing and to eliminate extraneous jokes. Most dramatically, the original ending was entirely redone after test audiences reacted unfavorably to it. That ending featured Ernest, after he has fled Lisle's party, meeting a bartender named Toni (Tracey Ullman) who helps him fake his death to evade Madeline and Helen. The two women encounter Ernest and the bartender 27 years later, living happily as a retired couple, while Madeline and Helen give no sign that they are enjoying their eternal existence. Zemeckis thought the ending was too happy, so opted for the darker ending featured in the final cut. Ullman was one of five actors with speaking roles in the film to be eliminated. Other scenes that were eliminated included one in which Madeline talks to her agent (Jonathan Silverman) and one in which Ernest removes a frozen Madeline from the kitchen freezer where he has stored her. Some of the scenes can be viewed in the original theatrical trailer.

== Release ==
=== Box office ===
Death Becomes Her was a box-office success, and opened at number one at the box office with $12,110,355, the same weekend as Buffy the Vampire Slayer and Bebe's Kids. It went on to earn over $58.4 million domestically and $90.6 million internationally. In Taipei, Death Becomes Her set a box-office record by earning $269,310 in two days, marking it the "biggest opening ever" for overseas distributor United International Pictures.

=== Home media ===
The film's release on DVD was called "appallingly bad" due to the quality of its transfer, which has been said to suffer from excessive grain, blur, and muted colors. A BBC review described it as "horrible" and "sloppy". Death Becomes Her was initially distributed in an open matte fullscreen (1.33:1) edition in the U.S., while a widescreen version with its theatrical aspect ratio (1.85:1) was released worldwide. The latter version has also been mistakenly labelled anamorphic. It was later released in North America on Blu-ray from Shout! Factory in 2016.

== Reception ==
Death Becomes Her received mixed reviews from critics, who praised its special effects and lead performances, but some found it lacking depth and substance. Review aggregator Rotten Tomatoes gives the film an approval rating of 58% based on 59 reviews, with an average rating of 6/10. The site's critics consensus reads: "Hawn and Streep are as fabulous as Death Becomes Her's innovative special effects; Zemeckis's satire, on the other hand, is as hollow as the world it mocks." On Metacritic, the film has a weighted average score of 56 out of 100 based on 24 critics, indicating "mixed or average" reviews. Audiences polled by CinemaScore gave the film an average grade of "B" on an A+ to F scale.

The Chicago Tribune's Dave Kehr wrote, "Instantly grotesque, relentless misanthropic and spectacularly tasteless, 'Death Becomes Her' isn't a film designed to win the hearts of the mass moviegoing public. But it is diabolically inventive and very, very funny." Todd McCarthy of Variety said, "While the fountain of youth theme has often come up in films, it has never been given anything like this treatment before." People praised the film's "flashes of originality, brilliant special effects and terrific performances—Willis as a curdled Milquetoast and Hawn as a woman who is finally feeling her own power. Streep makes a fine untamed shrew, by turns shrill, whiny, and cooing". Willis was also singled out for his against type comedic performance.

Negative reviews criticized the script and pacing, noting that its satire feels scattershot and that the plot is pushed aside for the special effects. Gene Siskel and Roger Ebert both gave Death Becomes Her a 'thumbs down', commenting that while the film has great special effects, it lacks any real substance or character depth. People said "screenwriters David Koepp and Martin Donovan would have done well to keep their skewed, scabrous vision in sharper focus and to display satire that rises to the level of a scene in which Rossellini is throwing a party for her myriad clients". Owen Gleiberman of Entertainment Weekly said, "The trouble with Death Becomes Her isn't that its comic vision is too dark but that it has no shadings, no acerbic glee. Zemeckis gives nastiness such a hard sell he forgets to take any delight in it."

Rita Kempley of The Washington Post gave an overall positive review in which she praised the script's "offbeat lines and unexpected laughs", but noted there is still an "underlying high-and-mighty moral tone, which might have come straight from the pen of Hawthorne -- a puritannical posture wholly deserving of Madeline's retort: 'Blah, blah, blah, blah.' Really, fellas, what's a little cucumber mask going to hurt?"

In Newsweek, David Ansen wrote, "Oddly, the more fantastical and grotesque this comedy becomes, the more conventional it seems-and the less it has to say. Somewhere in the middle of the movie, the characters take a back seat to the pyrotechnics, reality is replaced by cliffhangers and Gothic claptrap, and the laughs start to dry up. Satire needs a social context, but the filmmakers have little to say about the culture that created these age-obsessed women. Still, even when 'Death Becomes Her' wanders off course, it remains worth rooting for."

=== Accolades ===
Award	Category	Recipient	Result
Academy Awards	Best Visual Effects	Ken Ralston, Doug Chiang, Douglas Smythe, and Tom Woodruff Jr.	Won
BAFTA Award	Best Visual Effects	Michael Lantieri, Ken Ralston, Alec Gillis, Tom Woodruff Jr., Doug Chiang, and Douglas Smythe	Won
Golden Globe Award	Best Actress – Motion Picture Musical or Comedy	Meryl Streep	Nominated
Saturn Awards	Best Fantasy Film		Nominated
Saturn Awards	Best Actor	Bruce Willis	Nominated
Saturn Awards	Best Actress	Meryl Streep	Nominated
Saturn Awards	Best Supporting Actress	Isabella Rossellini	Won
Saturn Awards	Best Director	Robert Zemeckis	Nominated
Saturn Awards	Best Writing	Martin Donovan & David Koepp	Nominated
Saturn Awards	Best Music	Alan Silvestri	Nominated
Saturn Awards	Best Make-up	Dick Smith. & Kevin Haney	Nominated
Saturn Awards	Best Special Effects	Ken Ralston, Doug Chiang, Douglas Smythe, and Tom Woodruff Jr.	Won

=== Legacy ===
Death Becomes Her has acquired a significant cult following, especially in the LGBT community. At RogerEbert.com, Jessica Ritchey wrote, "Time has been kind to 'Death Becomes Her', and the mordantly funny eye it turns to Hollywood pretense and our cultural inability to forgive women for aging. With the virtual extinction of Hollywood's interest in women over thirty, it's a real pleasure to see a film centered on and held down by two actresses as strong as Streep and Hawn." An article in Vanity Fair titled "The Gloriously Queer Afterlife of 'Death Becomes Her'" called the film a "gay cult classic" and "a touchstone of the queer community". The movie is screened in bars during Pride Month, while the characters of Madeline and Helen are favorites of drag performers. In this vein, the film inspired a Death Becomes Her-themed runway show on season 7 of RuPaul's Drag Race. The winner of season 5, Jinkx Monsoon, has cited the film as an inspiration to become a drag queen. Jinkx has participated in Death Becomes Her-themed photoshoots, and in 2018 she played Madeline in a drag stage show parody called "Drag Becomes Her" alongside season 6 contestant BenDeLaCreme. Tom Campbell, an executive producer of RuPaul's Drag Race, reflected on the appeal of the movie to gay audiences:

They're fighting for beauty. They're against the system. They're also villains, but we understand their complexity. We root for the undead divas because they're trying to win a game that's rigged against them, and—to borrow an apocryphal quote from Ginger Rogers—they sort of have to do it 'backwards and in high heels'.

In May 2024, RuPaul's Drag Race's Trinity the Tuck and Jujubee released their single "'Til Death Becomes Us" alongside a music video, serving as an homage to the original film.

Rotten Tomatoes lists the film on its 100 Best Zombie Movies, ranked by Tomatometer.

The film serves as a major influence on the music video for American singer Sabrina Carpenter's "Taste", featuring Jenna Ortega and Rohan Campbell.

== Musical ==
A musical adaptation of Death Becomes Her was produced by Broadway In Chicago and Universal Stage Productions at the Cadillac Palace Theatre from April 30 to June 2, 2024. Directed and choreographed by Christopher Gattelli, with a book by Marco Pennette and music and lyrics by Julia Mattison and Noel Carey, the cast featured Megan Hilty as Madeline, Jennifer Simard as Helen, Christopher Sieber as Ernest, and Michelle Williams as Viola Van Horn (the character originally named Lisle von Rhuman). Chicago producers announced plans to begin Broadway performances later in the year, subsequently opening November 21 at the Lunt-Fontanne Theatre. The show garnered ten nominations at the 78th Tony Awards, with Paul Tazewell winning for best costume design.

== See also ==
- The Substance
- List of films featuring fictional films
