= Crosstown Traffic (film) =

1995 US TV movie by George Hickenlooper

Crosstown Traffic is a 1995 American TV movie. It was directed by George Hickenlooper who called it "a dreadful experience. It showed me that TV really is just a factory. But I needed the credit to get my Directors Guild card. I sold my soul to Satan; now I'm trying to get it back."

== Cast ==
- Tim Bohn as Raymond Klute
- Antoni Corone as Sergeant Barnes
- Dalton James as Brad
- Tone Loc as Keiser
- Gina Philips as Jamie
- Joseph Rye as Derrick
- Aries Spears as Eddie
- Sondra West as Shannon
- Adam Scott as Montana
- Jordan Marder as Drummer
- Carrie Genzel as Waitress
- Lynda Mendoza as Bar Patron
- Mike Altieri
- Anthony Backman
- Natasha Gregson Wagner
