= No Ordinary Baby =

American television film

- Genre: Drama
- Based on: "Carbon Copy: Meet the First Human Clone" by Richard Kadrey
- Teleplay by: Richard Kletter
- Directed by: Peter Werner
- Starring: Bridget Fonda; Mary Beth Hurt; Valerie Mahaffey; Philip Bosco; Adam LeFevre; Arnold Pinnock; Ron Lea; Ted Whittall; Bruce Dinsmore; Vlasta Vrána
- Music by: Brian Keane
- Country of origin: United States
- Original language: English

Production
- Executive producers: Steven Haft; Robert M. Sertner; Frank von Zerneck
- Producer: Randy Sutter
- Cinematography: Neil Roach
- Editor: Benjamin A. Weissman
- Running time: 91 minutes
- Production companies: Haft Entertainment; Von Zerneck-Sertner Films; Frank & Bob Films II; Hallmark Entertainment

Original release
- Network: Lifetime
- Release: October 8, 2001

No Ordinary Baby, also known as After Amy, is a 2001 American drama television film directed by Peter Werner and written by Richard Kletter, based on the 1998 Wired magazine short story "Carbon Copy: Meet the First Human Clone" by Richard Kadrey. It stars Bridget Fonda and Mary Beth Hurt, with Valerie Mahaffey, Philip Bosco, Adam LeFevre, Arnold Pinnock, Ron Lea, Ted Whittall, Bruce Dinsmore, and Vlasta Vrána co-starring. The film revolves around a reporter (Fonda) covering the birth of the first human clone and the public furor that ensues, along with the reputation troubles faced by the doctor involved (Hurt).

No Ordinary Baby premiered on Lifetime on October 8, 2001. Fonda was nominated for the best actress (miniseries or TV film) award at the 2002 Golden Globes for her role.

== Cast ==
- Bridget Fonda as Linda Sinclair
- Mary Beth Hurt as Dr. Amanda Gordon
- Valerie Mahaffey as Virginia Hytner
- Philip Bosco as Dr. Ed Walden
- Adam LeFevre as Chris Hytner
- Arnold Pinnock as Jimmy Wilmington
- Ron Lea as Matthew Gordon
- Ted Whittall as Dr. Stuart McElroy
- Bruce Dinsmore as Robert Rutger
- Vlasta Vrána as Dr. Dennis Griffiths
- Claudia Ferri as Nurse Alice Donovan
- Bill Haugland as Dan Reilly
