= In the Gloaming (film) =

1997 television film

- Based on: New Yorker short story
- Written by: Will Scheffer
- Directed by: Christopher Reeve
- Starring: Glenn Close; Bridget Fonda; Whoopi Goldberg; Robert Sean Leonard; David Strathairn
- Music by: Dave Grusin
- Country of origin: United States
- Original language: English

Production
- Executive producers: Michael Fuchs; Nicholas Paleologos; Frederick Zollo
- Producers: Nellie Nugiel; Bonnie Timmermann
- Cinematography: Frederick Elmes
- Editor: David Ray
- Running time: 77 minutes
- Production companies: Frederick Zollo Productions; HBO NYC Productions

Original release
- Network: HBO
- Release: April 20, 1997

In the Gloaming is a 1997 American television film written by Will Scheffer and directed by Christopher Reeve in his directorial debut. It stars Robert Sean Leonard, Glenn Close, David Strathairn, Bridget Fonda and Whoopi Goldberg. The movie is based on a short story in The New Yorker written by Alice Elliott Dark. The film premiered on HBO on April 20, 1997. It won four CableACE Awards and was nominated for five Primetime Emmy Awards.

== Premise ==
Prodigal son Danny leaves San Francisco and returns to his family’s home to die from late-stage AIDS. Danny finds the same icy-cool, upper-crust suburban home he left all those years ago. Danny’s father Martin is a middle-aged businessman who is unable to relate to his son, and who has never come to terms with his son's homosexuality. His sister Anne feels resentment about the closeness Danny and their mother share of which she's not a part, and she expresses ambiguity about Danny's sexuality. His mother Janet feels guilty for keeping her son at a distance, but she becomes the one with whom Danny emotionally connects (and with whom he ultimately ends up facing his death), as they share their thoughts on everything from movies to sex to love. Live-in nurse Myrna completes the picture.

== Cast ==
- Robert Sean Leonard as Danny
- Glenn Close as Janet
- David Strathairn as Martin
- Bridget Fonda as Anne
- Whoopi Goldberg as Nurse Myrna
- Annie Starke as Young Anne (daughter of Glenn Close)
- Will Reeve as Young Danny (son of Christopher Reeve)

== Production notes ==
Christopher Reeve had to direct most of the film from a room off set via TV monitors and headphones because the hissing sounds from his respirator would have ruined the actors' voice recordings. He would watch and listen to all the day’s scenes from the room, and when he had instructions to give, he used a microphone to convey those directives to a speaker situated next to the actors. Robert Sean Leonard said of Reeve, "to have someone on your set who cannot move, but who's in charge, is a rather incredible thing. Most first-time directors have a hard time with the chaos that goes on. [They tend to] put lots of the decisions on the cinematographer's shoulders. Not Chris. He held his own … He was the anchor."

== Critical reception ==
Variety wrote in their review that "Close is strikingly passionate, while Leonard is superb in capturing the complex layers of Danny’s ever-evolving emotional state...the movie is rare in its utter lack of contrived sentiment, even when Danny’s near death". The Chicago Tribune wrote "it's an exceptionally powerful work...and Leonard conveys a deep sense of release and clarity of vision, while Close shines as a woman whose tragedy forces her to revisit the paths taken in her life".

New York Times TV critic John J. O'Connor wrote that "Reeve makes an enormously impressive directorial debut". O'Connor also suggested that this is really a chamber piece, a duet for mother and son. "In this instance, both are extraordinary. Ms. Close...reminds us once again that she can be the most subtle and moving of actresses...and Mr. Leonard skillfully avoids easy sentimentality to create an admirably steel-edged portrait". The Hartford Courant wrote "the film belongs mostly to Close and Leonard, whose complicated, sometimes uncomfortably close relationship, drives the story". They also advised that the film is an hour well worth investing in, "an often deeply moving portrayal of an American family that too many, no doubt, know too well".

== Awards and nominations ==
Year	Nominee / work	Award	Result
1997	In The Gloaming	Primetime Emmy Award for Outstanding Television Movie	Nominated
1997	Christopher Reeve	Primetime Emmy Award for Outstanding Directing for a Limited Series, Movie, or Dramatic Special	Nominated
1997	Glenn Close	Primetime Emmy Award for Outstanding Lead Actress in a Limited Series or Movie	Nominated
1997	Bridget Fonda	Primetime Emmy Award for Outstanding Supporting Actress in a Limited Series or Movie	Nominated
1997	Fred Elmes	Primetime Emmy Award for Outstanding Cinematography for a Limited Series or Movie	Nominated
1997	In The Gloaming	CableACE Award for Dramatic or Theatrical Special	Won
1997	Glenn Close	CableACE Award for Guest Actress in a Dramatic Special or Series	Won
1997	Will Scheffer	CableACE Award for Writing a Dramatic Special or Series	Won
1997	Dave Grusin	CableACE Award for Original Score	Won
