= David Kirkpatrick (producer) =

American film producer (born 1951)

- Born: David Paul Kirkpatrick; June 29, 1951 (age 75); Pittsburgh, Pennsylvania
- Education: California Institute of the Arts
- Occupations: Film producer, studio executive, author
- Writing career
- Notable awards: Golden Globe, Independent Spirit Award

David Paul Kirkpatrick (born June 29, 1951) is an American film producer, studio executive and writer. He is widely known for his career at Paramount Pictures, where he started as a story editor, oversaw the studio's exclusive development deal with Eddie Murphy, and eventually became president of the Motion Picture Group.

In 2006, the New York Times called Kirkpatrick a "kingmaker" for his shepherding of Hollywood talent. Kirkpatrick was chief of production at two studios at the same time, Walt Disney Pictures and Touchstone Pictures.

Kirkpatrick set up the MIT Center for the Future of Storytelling in 2008 and the Story Summit in 2019. He has written two books, The Address of Happiness and The Dog with Steven James Taylor.

== Biography ==
Kirkpatrick was raised in Hudson, Ohio. In 1969, he graduated from Hudson High School. In 2015, he was inducted into the school's Distinguished Hall of Fame.

=== Paramount ===
While still in high school, Kirkpatrick sold his first screenplay to Paramount Pictures. He attended California Institute of the Arts, a school founded by Walt Disney. While there, he was the teaching assistant to the Dean of Film, Alexander MacKendrick, the writer-director of The Man in the White Suit and The Sweet Smell of Success. His education was underwritten by the Walt Disney Foundation and producer Ray Stark. He received his bachelor's degree in 1974.

Kirkpatrick's screenplay The Great Texas Dynamite Chase was produced in 1976 and distributed by New World Pictures. The LA Times called it "an auspicious first feature debut in this stylish and enjoyable fantasy about friendship among thieves". Shortly after, he took a position in the story department at Paramount Pictures. He worked on and off at Paramount for a total of 18 years.

As story editor, Kirkpatrick worked on films including Elephant Man, Ordinary People, and Terms of Endearment. Kirkpatrick made a name for himself by overseeing Paramount's exclusive development deal with Eddie Murphy. The arrangement resulted in several hits including the $234 million blockbuster Beverly Hills Cop.

During his years at Paramount, Kirkpatrick oversaw the Indiana Jones and Star Trek franchises, box office hits such as Top Gun (1986), Ghost (1990), and The Hunt for Red October (1990), and award-winning films such as Witness (1985), and Reds (1981).

Kirkpatrick worked under industry executives Barry Diller, Michael Eisner, and Jeffrey Katzenberg at Paramount. Both Kirkpatrick and Katzenberg were involved in the development of Coming to America (1988) and the subsequent Buchwald v. Paramount breach of contract lawsuit. The case was the subject of the 1992 book Fatal Subtraction.

Kirkpatrick was also instrumental in replacing Hunt for Red October star Alec Baldwin with Harrison Ford in the Jack Ryan franchise. Baldwin revealed this in a March 2011 column on The Huffington Post, in which he accused Kirkpatrick of back-handed dealings in the matter, referring to Kirkpatrick as "a beady-eyed, untalented tool".

=== Disney and Touchstone ===
From 1987 to 1989, Kirkpatrick became the chief of production at Walt Disney Pictures and Touchstone Pictures, becoming the first motion picture executive to hold that position at two studios at the same time. During that period, he oversaw The Little Mermaid (1989), Pretty Woman (1990), and Dead Poets Society (1989) among other films, before returning to Paramount.

In an interview with The New York Times in 2006, Michael D Eisner, former President of Paramount and Chairman of The Walt Disney Company, who worked with Kirkpatrick at both studios, referred to Kirkpatrick as “creative, thoughtful, hard-working, and committed.”

=== Original Voices ===
Kirkpatrick left his post at Paramount after finding his office furniture on the lawn after an altercation with the CEO of Paramount Communications, [Paramount's parent company], executive Stanley R. Jaffe. Kirkpatrick later filed a lawsuit against Stanley Jaffe for "emotional distress" and "abusive humiliation", and it was settled out of court.

Afterward, he entered into a production deal with Paramount and then produced The Brady Bunch Movie (1995), and The Evening Star (1996), a sequel to Terms of Endearment.

He then formed his own production company, Original Voices, concentrating on smaller-budget projects, producing the independent hits Big Night (1996) and The Opposite of Sex (1998), with Rysher Entertainment, and Rasputin: Dark Servant of Destiny with HBO, which won the Golden Globe for Best Television Movie.

=== Plymouth Rock Studios ===
In 2007, Kirkpatrick co-founded Plymouth Rock Studios, a planned $500 million film and television studio that was scheduled to open in 2012 in Plymouth, Massachusetts. Other executives involved included Earl Lestz, former President of Paramount Studio Groups for 21 years, real estate developer Bill Wynne, who built Rancho Santa Margarita, and Joe DiLorenzo, former CFO of the Boston Celtics and current Chairman of the Financial Executives International organization. In November 2007, the Studio had announced that it had secured $500 million in financing. The financing eventually fell through in 2008, due to the national financial crisis that affected construction. Kirkpatrick and Plymouth Rock Studios parted ways in June 2010.

=== MIT’S Center for Future Storytelling ===
In 2008, Kirkpatrick founded the MIT Center for Future Storytelling with the Massachusetts Institute of Technology Media Laboratory, in an effort to study the narrative in modern culture. The New York Times went so far as to say Kirkpatrick was interested in "Saving the Story" and was planning a documentary entitled The World Without Story. “The idea, as we move forward with 21st-century storytelling, is to try to keep meaning alive,” he said to the New York Times. According to Kirkpatrick, citing the works of Victor Hugo, Harriet Beecher Stowe, and Charles Dickens, story “activates social change, transforms community, and changes lives.”)

=== Story Summit and the Storyteller Foundation ===
In 2019, Kirkpatrick founded the Story Summit, and in 2020, the non-profit Storyteller Foundation, for the purpose of encouraging expert storytellers in print, film, and television to guide and inspire emerging writers. He has set up scholarship funds for those writers with underwriting from writers themselves, including screenwriter Jeff Arch (Sleepless in Seattle), author Amy Ferris (Marrying George Clooney), and author Debra Engle (The Only Little Prayer You Need).

=== Writing (2013 – 2021) ===
Kirkpatrick returned to his writing in 2013 with the original work, The Address of Happiness. According to GLAAD, "The book takes the reader inside a journey of love, peace, happiness, and spirituality". In a review, The Huffington Post said the book “advances Hemingway’s plain-sense writing to a new, melodious level. Each line acts like a story within itself, full of imagery demanding its own voice.” Other books include Breakfast in the Temple, and The Dog with Steven James Taylor.

== Filmography ==
He was a producer in all films unless otherwise noted.

=== Film ===
Year	Film	Credit
1995	The Brady Bunch Movie	
1995	Let It Be Me	
1996	Big Night	Executive producer
1996	The Evening Star	
1997	The Opposite of Sex	
1997	A Smile Like Yours	
2000	Bruno	
2001	The Whole Shebang	
2003	National Lampoon's Barely Legal	Executive producer

=== Television ===
Year	Title	Credit	Notes
1993	The Substitute	Executive producer	Television film
1996	Rasputin: Dark Servant of Destiny	Executive producer	Television film

== Awards ==
David Kirkpatrick produced the 1996 HBO film Rasputin that won the Golden Globe for Best Mini-Series of Motion Picture Made for Television. Alan Rickman won both the Emmy and the Golden Globe for his title performance role in the mini-series. Kirkpatrick also produced The Opposite of Sex, which received the 1999 Independent Spirit Award for Best First Feature. In 2007, he became the first recipient of the "David Award" the lifetime achievement award from Regent University, a Christian college, for "redemptive work" in the entertainment field. The award derives its name from the David of the Old Testament.
