= It Could Happen to You (1994 film) =

1994 film by Andrew Bergman

- Theatrical release poster
- Directed by: Andrew Bergman
- Written by: Jane Anderson
- Produced by: Mike Lobell
- Starring: Nicolas Cage; Bridget Fonda; Rosie Perez; Wendell Pierce; Isaac Hayes; Seymour Cassel; Stanley Tucci; J. E. Freeman
- Cinematography: Caleb Deschanel
- Edited by: Barry Malkin
- Music by: Carter Burwell
- Distributed by: TriStar Pictures
- Release date: July 29, 1994
- Running time: 101 minutes
- Country: United States
- Language: English
- Budget: $20 million
- Box office: $47.7 million

It Could Happen to You is a 1994 American romantic comedy-drama film starring Nicolas Cage and Bridget Fonda. In a plot inspired by a real-life news story, a New York Police Department officer (Cage) who is short on cash and unable to tip his waitress (Fonda), half-jokingly offers to share his winnings if he happens to win the lottery.

Isaac Hayes is the film's narrator and also plays a supporting role as Angel Dupree.

It Could Happen to You was released by TriStar Pictures on July 29, 1994. The film received positive reviews from critics and grossed $47.7 million against a $20 million budget.

The film was remade in Hindi as Bade Dilwala, which was released in 1999 and in Telugu as Bahumati in 2007.

== Plot ==
Police officer Charlie Lang is kind and generous. He loves his job and enjoys a strong rapport with the Queens neighborhood where he lives. His wife Muriel works in a hairdressing salon. Muriel is greedy, selfish, and materialistic; she constantly complains about their situation in life.

Waitress Yvonne Biasi, also kind and generous, is newly bankrupt. Her estranged husband Eddie has taken her credit card and spent $12,000 without her consent. The court holds her responsible for the entire bill; moreover, her boss docks her pay for the time she spent in court.

Yvonne hits it off with Charlie while waiting on him at the diner where she works. Charlie, not having enough money for a tip, instead offers Yvonne double the tip tomorrow or half of his prospective lottery winnings. He wins a $4 million share of a $64 million lottery prize the next day.

Charlie makes good on his offer to split the prize with Yvonne, despite Muriel's protests. Charlie and Yvonne become instant celebrities, while Muriel becomes a spokesperson for her favorite beauty products.

Yvonne buys the diner, and fires her ex-boss. She also sets up a table, with Charlie's name, at which people who cannot afford food can eat for free. Meanwhile, Charlie is wounded while foiling two would-be-robbers at a grocery store. Following a commendation, he takes mandatory leave from the NYPD.

Charlie and Yvonne are invited to a gathering on a chartered boat for the lottery winners and members of high society. They miss the cruise so they bond over dinner. Muriel flirts with the wealthy Jack Gross.

Muriel throws Charlie out of their apartment and demands a divorce, ostensibly because she is fed up with his charitable nature. That evening, Yvonne leaves her apartment after her husband Eddie shows up - threatening to stay unless he gets $50,000 from her. Charlie and Yvonne run into each other at the Plaza Hotel, where they spend the night together.

At Muriel's and Charlie's divorce proceedings, she demands all the money that he won for herself. Charlie acquiesces but draws the line when she also demands the half he gave Yvonne. The case goes to court, which rules in Muriel's favor.

Yvonne, feeling guilty at having bankrupted Charlie and wrecked his marriage, pushes him away. But he is in love with her, insisting that he does not care about the money and is far better off without Muriel. Yvonne reciprocates.

While ruminating about their future at Yvonne's closed diner, the new couple provide a homeless man with soup at the Charlie Lang Table. The man is actually undercover photojournalist Angel Dupree, the film's narrator; he takes photos of Yvonne and Charlie for the next day's headline in the New York Post, wherein Angel praises their willingness to support him, even in their own "darkest hour."

As Charlie and Yvonne are preparing to move out of NYC, they receive mail from hundreds of New Yorkers who read Angel's exposé. The mail consists of encouraging letters, along with "tips for the cop and the waitress" totaling about $600,000, which pays the couple's debts.

Right after Muriel becomes "Mrs. Jack Gross," he turns out to be a con artist who flees the country once he steals all of her money. Broke, she moves back in with her mother in the Bronx, and returns to her old job as a manicurist. Yvonne divorces Eddie, who never gets the $50,000 and ends up working as a cab driver.

Charlie returns to the police force, while Yvonne reclaims the diner. They get married and, for their honeymoon, enjoy a hot-air balloon-ride over Central Park.

== Cast ==
- Nicolas Cage as Charlie Lang
- Bridget Fonda as Yvonne Biasi
- Rosie Perez as Muriel Lang
- Wendell Pierce as Bo Williams
- Isaac Hayes as Angel Dupree
- Seymour Cassel as Jack Gross
- Stanley Tucci as Eddie Biasi
- Richard Jenkins as C. Vernon Hale
- Red Buttons as Walter Zakuto
- Victor Rojas as Jesu
- J. E. Freeman as Sal Bontempo
- Charles Busch as Timmy
- Beatrice Winde as Judge
- Vincent Pastore as Bowling Team Member
- Emily Deschanel as Paint Throwing Fur Activist
- Willie Colón as Mayor
- Frank Pellegrino as Water's Edge Maitre D'
- Ann Dowd as Carol
- Lim Kay Tong as Sun

== Production ==
The diner where Yvonne works in the film was constructed in a parking lot at the corner of N. Moore St. and West Broadway in the Tribeca neighborhood of Manhattan. The film was called "Cop Gives Waitress Million Dollar Tip" when it was shot there.

== Reception ==
The film received generally positive reviews from critics. Rotten Tomatoes calculates a "Fresh" rating with a score of 73% based on reviews from 37 critics.

The film grossed $37,939,757 in the United States and Canada but only $9.8 million internationally for a worldwide total of $47.7 million.

On home video in the United States, the video was more popular than expected with copies being rented more frequently during the period January to June 1995 than any other title, with an average copy being rented 57 times.

== Soundtrack ==
The soundtrack album was released by Columbia Records/Sony Records on July 19, 1994.

1. "Young at Heart" – Tony Bennett and Shawn Colvin
2. "They Can't Take That Away from Me" – Billie Holiday
3. "Now It Can Be Told" – Tony Bennett
4. "Swingdown, Swingtown" – Wynton Marsalis
5. "She's No Lady" – Lyle Lovett
6. "Always" – Tony Bennett
7. "Overture" – Carter Burwell
8. "I Feel Lucky" – Mary Chapin Carpenter
9. "Round of Blues" – Shawn Colvin
10. "The Search" – Carter Burwell
11. "Young at Heart" – Frank Sinatra

== Real-life incident ==
In 1984, Phyllis Penzo was a waitress at a pizzeria commonly frequented by Yonkers, New York, police officers. In March of that year, Officer Robert Cunningham, a regular patron and longtime friend of Penzo, suggested that the two split a lottery ticket, each of them choosing three of the six numbers, in lieu of his leaving her a tip. Penzo agreed, and though she subsequently forgot about it, when Cunningham discovered that the ticket had won a $6 million prize, he honored their verbal agreement and split the money evenly with Penzo.

Beyond this basic premise, the film is entirely fictional, with the backgrounds of the film's characters and the events depicted in the film subsequent to their lottery win bearing no resemblance to the actual lives of Penzo and Cunningham. As a result, neither Penzo nor Cunningham were required to authorize the film, nor were they entitled to collect royalties from its proceeds. The closing credits of the film include a disclaimer stating that although the film was inspired by actual events, at the time of production both Penzo and Cunningham were happily married to their respective spouses.
