= Martin Donovan (screenwriter) =

Argentine screenwriter and film director

- Born: Carlos Enrique Varela y Peralta Ramos; January 21, 1950 (age 76); Buenos Aires, Argentina
- Other name: Martín Donovan
- Occupations: Screenwriter, director, producer, actor, script consultant
- Years active: 1965–present
- Known for: Apartment Zero; Death Becomes Her; Somebody Is Waiting; Loving Couples; Mad at the Moon
- Awards: Special Jury Prize and Critics Award at Cognac Festival du Film Policier; Golden Space Needle Award at Seattle International Film Festival

Martin Donovan (born Carlos Enrique Varela y Peralta Ramos; January 21, 1950) is an Argentine screenwriter and film director. Donovan has developed his career working mainly in United Kingdom's and Hollywood's cinema, and he is mostly recognized as the co-writer and director of the cult film Apartment Zero (1989), and for his co-written script for Death Becomes Her (1992).

== Biography ==
=== Early life ===
Martin Donovan was born in Buenos Aires as Carlos Enrique Varela Peralta Ramos. His great-great-grandfather was Patricio Peralta Ramos, founder of the city of Mar del Plata. Donovan was the eldest of seven brothers and one sister, and he was viewed as the "strange one of the family" from the very beginning. He connected with movies and the theater since he was six or seven years old and he voraciously read everything. His passion for films was shown, for instance, when he became desperate to see A Streetcar Named Desire. The young Martin would cry: "Why can't I see A Streetcar Named Desire?!", to which his mother would reply: "Because you're 8! Go wash your hands and come to the table!" In 1961, at the age of 11, he wrote a letter to filmmaker Luchino Visconti, addressing the envelope as "Luchino Visconti, Italy, Europe". Visconti received the letter and replied; 8 years later Martin Donovan was at his side as his assistant.

In 1963 he was sent to boarding school at Colegio de la Inmaculada Concepción in Santa Fe Province, where Eduardo Peralta Ramos SJ, Martin's mother's elder brother, was a teacher and the spiritual father of Jorge Bergoglio, later known as Pope Francis. Donovan went back home in 1964, and a couple of months later he escaped his parents’ home through a window, leaving a letter to his mother, which read: "Don't cry mama, I need to find myself..." He soon became a runaway in Buenos Aires during summer, with only his maternal grandmother, Celia Lertora de Peralta Ramos — whom Martin called "Mamama" — as his accomplice. Those summer months in Buenos Aires while the police were searching all over for him became a fundamental period in his life.

=== Career ===
Donovan began his career acting in Italian films, such as Fellini's Satyricon (1969), and assisted Luchino Visconti in several films. After traveling to England in the mid-60s he joined a theater company called Nuvact Studio International and collaborated with other directors such as Peter Brook, John Schlesinger and Vittorio De Sica. At the same time, Donovan consistently participated as a screenwriter and a story/script consultant in many British and American TV series. His first film as a director, State of Wonder (1984), was featured in the Official Selection at the Berlin Film Festival of that same year.

Donovan's second work as a director, Apartment Zero (1989), a British-Argentine coproduction, was entirely filmed in Buenos Aires and features Hart Bochner and a then relatively unknown Colin Firth in one of his first starring roles, together with a mostly Argentine cast. It is a complex suspense story with psychodrama elements, in the tradition of Joseph Losey and Roman Polanski movies. The film has gained a strong cult following over the years.

His most important work in Hollywood was the screenplay for the big budget black comedy Death Becomes Her (1992), which was directed by Robert Zemeckis and starred Meryl Streep, Goldie Hawn and Bruce Willis.

In 1996 he wrote and directed Somebody Is Waiting, a drama starring Gabriel Byrne, Nastassja Kinski and Johnny Whitworth.

== Filmography ==
- State of Wonder (1984)
- Apartment Zero (with David Koepp) (1988)
- Mad at the Moon (1992)
- Death Becomes Her (with David Koepp) (1992)
- Somebody Is Waiting (1996)
- K. Il bandito (2008)

TV movies

Year	Title	Director	Writer
1984	Poor Richard	No	Story
1991	Death Dreams	Yes	No
1991	Seeds of Tragedy	Yes	No
1992	The White River	Yes	No
1993	The Substitute	Yes	No
