= Plymouth Rock Studios =

- Type: Movie Studio
- Industry: Film
- Founded: 2008
- Defunct: 2010
- Headquarters: 41°47′16.15″N 70°36′6.9″W, Plymouth, Massachusetts, United States
- Key people: David Kirkpatrick
- Website: Plymouth Rock Studios

Plymouth Rock Studios was a proposed film and television production studio in Massachusetts. The studio had held a now-expired option to buy Waverly Oaks Golf Club in Plymouth as the site for the $650 million, 1,260,000-square-foot (117,000 m^{2}) development originally slated to be complete in 2010. The proposal included fourteen sound stages 10-acre (40,000 m^{2}) back lots, a multipurpose theater, a hotel and offices. The original proposed location for the studio complex was located in South Plymouth, near the town lines of Bourne and Wareham, but was rejected because of faulty land titles.

Construction of the studio was planned to start in July 2009, but was delayed indefinitely in November 2009 when construction funding fell through weeks before the planned groundbreaking.

== History ==
=== Plans and studio facilities ===
The future home of Plymouth Rock Studios was first proposed in early 2008. A first site chosen in South Plymouth, off Bourne Road, was abandoned when title issues threatened to delay construction indefinitely. Shortly thereafter a new plan - on the site of an existing golf course on Long Pond Road (Waverly Oaks Golf Course), was announced.

As of 2011, the facility no longer has any option on the Waverly property and the owner is trying to develop a housing community.

=== Local Support ===
Plymouth citizens overwhelmingly voted on May 10, 2008, in support of the studio. Question 3 was a nonbinding referendum used to evaluate whether Plymouth voters were in support of plans of Plymouth Rock Studios being built in their town. The vote was in favor with 8,530 votes of yes and 1,118 votes of no. On October 27, 2008, a vote by members present at the Plymouth town meeting passed articles granting zoning privileges and tax breaks for Plymouth Rock Studios.

=== The "Hollywood East" Sign ===
In May 2008, Plymouth Rock Studios licensed the rights to the iconic Hollywood sign from the Hollywood Chamber of Commerce. The studio planned to erect a "Hollywood East" sign in the Plymouth area to accompany the studio. A temporary installation of the sign, standing 5 feet (1.5 m) tall and 45 feet (14 m) across, at the Plymouth Courthouse was unveiled in July 2008, but was quickly removed after various groups objected.
