= Hart Bochner =

Canadian actor, film director, screenwriter and producer

- Born: Hart Matthew Bochner; October 3, 1956 (age 70); Toronto, Ontario, Canada
- Occupations: Actor; director; screenwriter; producer
- Years active: 1977–present
- Parent: Lloyd Bochner (father)

Hart Matthew Bochner (born October 3, 1956) is a Canadian TV, film and voice actor, film director, screenwriter and producer. He has appeared in films such as Breaking Away (1979), Terror Train (1980), Rich and Famous (1981), The Wild Life (1984), Making Mr. Right (1987), Die Hard (1988), Apartment Zero (1988), Mr. Destiny (1990), Mad at the Moon (1992), Break Up (1998), Liberty Stands Still (2002) and Spread (2009). On television, he has starred in War and Remembrance (1988–89), Children of the Dust (1995), Baby for Sale (2004), The Starter Wife (2008) and Scandal (2015).

== Early life ==
Bochner was born in Toronto, Ontario, the son of Ruth (née Roher), a concert pianist, and the late actor Lloyd Bochner. His family is Jewish. Bochner is a board member of the Environmental Media Awards. His grand-uncle was journalist, lawyer and philanthropist Isaiah L. Kenen.

== Career ==
Bochner appeared in such films as Islands in the Stream (1977), Breaking Away (1979), Terror Train (1980), Rich and Famous (1981), Supergirl (1984), Apartment Zero (1988), Die Hard (1988), Mr. Destiny and Fellow Traveller (1989). In the late 1990s, Bochner had a voice role in Batman: Mask of the Phantasm (1993) and starred opposite Susan Sarandon in Anywhere But Here (1999). He also appeared in the films Urban Legends: Final Cut (2000), and Say Nothing (2001). Bochner had an uncredited role in the 2013 remake of Carrie.

On television, Bochner had a key role as Byron Henry in the 1988 ABC miniseries War and Remembrance. Later, he starred as Zach, the boyfriend of Molly Kagan (Debra Messing), on USA Network's short-lived series The Starter Wife (2008).

Among the films he has directed are PCU (1994), High School High (1996), and Just Add Water (2008).

== Filmography ==
=== Film ===
Year	Title	Role	Notes
1977	Islands in the Stream	Tom Hudson	
1979	Breaking Away	Rodney "Rod"	
1980	Terror Train	"Doc" Manley	
1981	Rich and Famous	Chris Adams	
1984	Supergirl	Ethan	
1984	The Wild Life	David Curtiss	
1987	Making Mr. Right	Don	
1988	Die Hard	Harry Ellis	
1988	Apartment Zero	Jack Carney	
1989	Fellow Traveller	Clifford Byrne	
1990	Mr. Destiny	Niles Pender	
1992	Mad at the Moon	Miller Brown	
1993	The Innocent	Russell	
1993	Batman: Mask of the Phantasm	Arthur Reeves	Voice
1998	Bulworth	Hugh Waldron, Bulworth's Political Opponent	Uncredited
1998	Break Up	Frankie Dade	
1999	Anywhere But Here	Josh Spritzer	
2000	Urban Legends: Final Cut	Professor Solomon	
2001	Speaking of Sex	Felix	
2001	Say Nothing	Matt	
2002	Liberty Stands Still	Captain Hank Wilford	
2002	Project Redlight	Narrator	Short film
2009	Spread	Will	Uncredited
2009	Company Retreat	Lonny	
2013	Carrie	Mr. Hargensen	Uncredited
2016	Rules Don't Apply	Colonel Willis	
2024	The Last Stand of Ellen Cole	Duke	

=== Television ===
Year	Title	Role	Notes
1980	Haywire	William "Bill" Hayward	Television film
1981	East of Eden	Aron Trask	Miniseries; 3 episodes
1982	Having It All	Jess Enright	Television film
1982	Callahan	Callahan	Television film
1984	The Sun Also Rises	Jake Barnes	Miniseries
1988–1989	War and Remembrance	Byron Henry	Miniseries; 12 episodes
1990	Teach 109	Dr. Bonner	TV Short
1991	Screen Two	Clifford Byrne	Episode: "Fellow Traveller"
1991	And the Sea Will Tell	Buck Walker	Television film
1993	Complex of Fear	Ray Dolan	Television film
1993	The Legend of Prince Valiant	Roland	Voice, episode: "The Shadows of Destiny"
1995	Children of the Dust	Shelby Hornbeck	Television film
2001	Night Visions	Jack	Episode: "Now He's Coming Up the Stairs/Used Car"
2001	Silicon Follies	Unknown	Television film
2003	Crossing Jordan	Ben Hothorne	Episode: "Ockham's Razor"
2003	Once Around the Park	Nick Wingfield	Television film
2004	Baby for Sale	Steve Johnson	Television film
2005	The Inside	Cole Brandt	Episode: "Old Wounds"
2008	The Starter Wife	Zach McNeill	10 episodes
2012	Scruples	Ellis Ikehorn	Television film
2012	Leverage	Frank Madigan	Episode: "The Corkscrew Job"
2013	Grey's Anatomy	Julian Crest	Episode: "This Is Why We Fight"
2013	Franklin & Bash	Patrick Fitzgerald	Episode: "Shoot to Thrill"
2014	Feed Me	Will	Episode: "The Goal of Sexual Intercourse"
2015	Scandal	Mayor Verrano	Episode: "I'm Just a Bill"
2015	Royal Pains	Bruce Beeman	Episode: "Lending a Shoulder"
2017	Criminal Minds	Sam Bower	Episode: "Unforgettable"
2019	Too Old To Die Young	Lieutenant	Recurring
