= List of awards and nominations received by Queen Latifah =

Queen Latifah awards and nominations
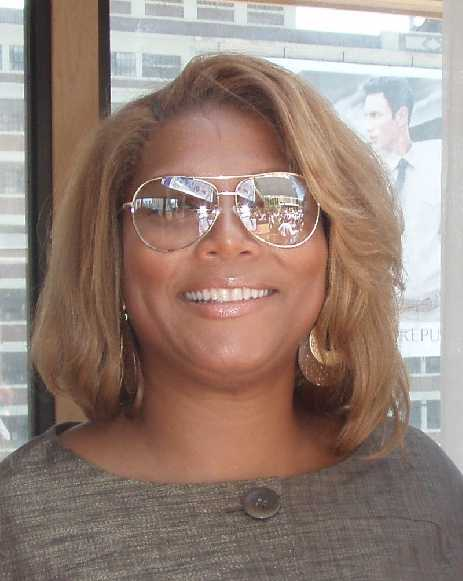
- Latifah at the LEAGUE National Awards and Recognition Luncheon in 2008
Awards and nominations (Note: Awards in certain categories do not have prior nominations and only winners are announced by the jury. For simplification and to avoid errors, each award in this list has been presumed to have had a prior nomination.)
Awards	Wins	Nominations
Academy Awards	0	1
BAFTA Awards	0	1
BET Awards	1	6
Black Reel Awards	3	18
Critics' Choice Awards	2	4
Golden Globe Awards	1	3
Grammy Awards	1	7
NAACP Image Awards	5	15
Primetime Emmy Awards	1	3
Screen Actors Guild Awards	3	5
Soul Train Music Awards	1	1
Awards won	30
Nominations	102

Queen Latifah is an American Golden Globe Award, Grammy Award, and Primetime Emmy Award-winning rapper, singer, and actress. She was the first rapper female or male to be awarded with the BET Lifetime Achievement Award in 2021.

== Academy Awards ==
Year	Category	Film	Result won
2002	Best Supporting Actress	Chicago	Nominated

== American Black Film Festival ==
Year	Category	Film	Result
1996	Outstanding Performance - Actress	Set It Off	Won
2005	Outstanding Performance by an Actress in a Leading Role	Beauty Shop	Nominated

== BAFTA Awards ==
Year	Category	Film	Result
2003	Best Actress in a Supporting Role	Chicago	Nominated

== BET Awards ==
The BET Awards were established in 2001 by the Black Entertainment Television network.

Year	Nominee / work	Award	Result
2003	Chicago	Best Actress	Won
2004	Bringing Down the House & Brown Sugar	Best Actress	Nominated
2005	Taxi & Beauty Shop	Best Actress	Nominated
2005	The Cookout	Outstanding Writing for a Theatrical Film	Nominated
2006	Last Holiday	Best Actress	Nominated
2008	Life Support	Best Actress	Nominated
2021	Herself	BET Lifetime Achievement Award	Won

== Black Movie Awards ==
Year	Category	Film	Result
2006	Outstanding Performance by an Actress in a Leading Role	Last Holiday	Nominated
2005	Outstanding Performance by an Actress in a Leading Role	Beauty Shop	Nominated

== Black Reel Awards ==
Year	Category	Film	Result
2000	Best Supporting Actress	The Bone Collector	Nominated
2003	Best Supporting Actress	Chicago	Won
2004	Best Actress	Bringing Down the House	Nominated
2006	Best Actress	Beauty Shop	Nominated
2008	Best Actress	The Perfect Holiday	Nominated
2009	Best Actress	The Secret Life of Bees	Won
2009	Best Ensemble	The Secret Life of Bees	Nominated
2010	Best Actress	Just Wright	Nominated
2010	Best Original or Adapted Song	Champion (from Just Wright)	Nominated
2013	Best Voice Performance	Ice Age: Continental Drift	Nominated
2013	Best Television or Mini-Series Performance, Female	Ice Age: Continental Drift	Nominated
2016	Best Actress, TV Movie or Limited Series	Bessie	Won

== Black Reel Awards for Television ==
Year	Category	TV series/film	Result
2018	Outstanding Supporting Actress, TV Movie/Limited Series	Flint	Nominated
2018	Outstanding TV Movie/Limited Series	Flint	Nominated
2020	Outstanding TV Movie/Limited Series	The Clark Sisters: First Ladies of Gospel	Nominated
2021	Outstanding Actress, Drama Series	The Equalizer	Nominated
2023	Outstanding Lead Performance in a Drama Series	The Equalizer	Nominated
2024	Outstanding Lead Performance in a Drama Series	The Equalizer	Nominated

== Critics' Choice Award ==
Year	Category	Film	Result
2003	Best Acting Ensemble	Chicago	Won
2008	Best Acting Ensemble	Hairspray	Won
2008	Best Song	"Come So Far" from Hairspray	Nominated

== Critics' Choice Television Award ==
Year	Category	Film	Result
2015	Best Actress in a Movie/Miniseries	Bessie	Nominated

== Elle Women in Hollywood Awards ==
Year	Category	Film	Result
2004	Icon Award	Herself	Won

== Essence Black Women in Hollywood ==
Year	Category	Film	Result
2010	Power Award	Herself	Won

== Golden Globe Awards ==
Year	Category	Film	Result
2003	Best Supporting Actress in a Motion Picture	Chicago	Nominated
2008	Best Actress in a Miniseries or Television Film	Life Support	Won
2016	Best Actress in a Miniseries or Television Film	Bessie	Nominated

== Gracie Allen Awards ==
Year	Category	Film	Result
2008	Outstanding Female Lead - Drama Series or Special	Life Support	Won

== Grammy Awards ==
Year	Category	Title	Result
1991	Best Rap Solo Performance	All Hail the Queen	Nominated
1992	Best Rap Solo Performance	"Fly Girl"	Nominated
1993	Best Rap Solo Performance	"Latifah Had It Up To Here"	Nominated
1995	Best Rap Solo Performance	"U.N.I.T.Y."	Won
2004	Best Female Rap Solo Performance	"Go Head"	Nominated
2005	Best Jazz Vocal Album	The Dana Owens Album	Nominated
2008	Best Traditional Pop Vocal Album	Trav'lin' Light	Nominated

== Hollywood Film Awards ==
Year	Category	Film	Result
2007	Ensemble of the Year	Hairspray	Won
2008	Ensemble of the Year	The Secret Life of Bees	Won

== Hollywood Walk of Fame ==
Year	Category	Result nominated	Queen Latifah	Won

== Image Awards ==
Year	Category	Title	Result
2025	Outstanding Actress in a Drama Series	The Equalizer	Won
2024	Outstanding Actress in a Drama Series	The Equalizer	Nominated
2023	Outstanding Actress in a Drama Series	The Equalizer	Nominated
2022	Outstanding Actress in a Drama Series	The Equalizer	Nominated
2018	Outstanding Actress in a Television Movie, Mini-Series or Dramatic Special	Flint	Won
2016	Outstanding Actress in a Television Movie, Mini-Series or Dramatic Special	Bessie	Won
2015	Outstanding Host in a Talk, Reality, News/Information or Variety Series	The Queen Latifah Show	Nominated
2013	Outstanding Actress in a Television Movie, Mini-Series or Dramatic Special	Steel Magnolias	Nominated
2011	Outstanding Actress in a Motion Picture	Just Wright	Nominated
2009	Outstanding Actress in a Motion Picture	The Secret Life of Bees	Nominated
2008	Outstanding Actress in a Television Movie/Mini-Series	Life Support	Won
2008	Outstanding Supporting Actress in a Motion Picture	Hairspray	Nominated
2007	Outstanding Actress in a Motion Picture	Last Holiday	Nominated
2006	Outstanding Actress in a Motion Picture	Beauty Shop	Nominated
2005	Outstanding Album	The Dana Owens Album	Nominated
2005	Outstanding Female Artist	The Dana Owens Album	Nominated
2004	Outstanding Actress in a Motion Picture	Bringing Down the House	Won
2003	Outstanding Supporting Actress in a Motion Picture	Brown Sugar	Nominated
2002	Outstanding Supporting Actress in a Motion Picture	The Bone Collector	Nominated
1999	Outstanding Actress in a Mini-Series/ Television Movie	Mama Flora's Family	Nominated
1999	Outstanding Supporting Actress in a Motion Picture	Living Out Loud	Nominated
1998	Outstanding Actress in a Comedy Series	Living Single	Nominated
1997	Outstanding Actress in a Motion Picture	Set It Off	Nominated
1997	Outstanding Actress in a Comedy Series	Living Single	Nominated
1996	Outstanding Actress in a Comedy Series	Living Single	Nominated

== Indie Awards ==
Year	Category	Film	Result
1991	Best Rap Album	Nature of a Sista'	Won

== Independent Spirit Awards ==
Year	Category	Film	Result
1997	Best Supporting Female	Set It Off	Nominated

== Kids' Choice Awards ==
Year	Category	Film	Result
1995	Favorite Television Actress	Living Single	Nominated
1996	Favorite Television Actress	Living Single	Nominated
2004	Favorite Movie Actress	Bringing Down the House	Nominated
2005	Wannabe Award	Herself	Won
2007	Favorite Voice from an Animated Movie	Ice Age: The Meltdown	Won

== MTV Movie & TV Awards ==
Year	Category	Film	Result
2004	Best Female Performance	Bringing Down the House	Nominated
2004	Best Fight	Bringing Down the House Shared w/ Missi Pyle	Nominated
2003	Best Female Performance	Chicago	Nominated

== Primetime Emmy Awards ==
Year	Category	Film	Result
2007	Outstanding Lead Actress in a Miniseries or Movie	Life Support	Nominated
2015	Outstanding Lead Actress in a Limited Series or a Movie	Bessie	Nominated
2015	Outstanding Television Movie	Bessie (as Executive Producer)	Won
2018	Outstanding Television Movie	Flint (as Executive Producer)	Nominated

== Palm Springs International Film Festival ==
Year	Category	Title	Result
2007	Ensemble Cast	Hairspray	Won

== People's Choice Awards ==
Year	Category	Title	Result
2006	Favorite Funny Female Star	Herself	Nominated
2007	Favorite Funny Female Star	Herself	Nominated
2008	Favorite Leading Lady - Movie	Herself	Nominated
2009	Favorite Leading Lady - Movie	Herself	Nominated
2014	Favorite New Talk Show Host	Herself	Won
2015	Favorite Daytime TV Host	Herself	Nominated

== Phoenix Film Critics Society Award ==
Year	Category	Title	Result
2002	Best Cast	Chicago	Nominated

== Satellite Awards ==
Year	Category	Title	Result
2015	Best Actress in a Miniseries/ Television Movie	Bessie	Nominated
2008	Best Actress in a Mini-Series/ Television Movie	Life Support	Won
2003	Best Supporting Actress in a Mini-Series/ Television Movie	Living With the Dead	Nominated

== Screen Actors Guild Awards ==
Year	Category	Title	Result
2003	Outstanding Actress in a Supporting Role	Chicago	Nominated
2003	Outstanding Cast	Chicago	Won
2008	Outstanding Actress in a Miniseries or Movie	Life Support	Won
2008	Outstanding Cast	Hairspray	Nominated
2016	Outstanding Actress in a Miniseries or Movie	Bessie	Won

== Soul Train Music Awards ==
Year	Category	Title	Result
1995	Entertainer of the Year	Herself	Won

== Teen Choice Awards ==
Year	Category	Title	Result
2003	Choice Movie Actress: Action/Drama	Chicago	Nominated
2003	Choice Movie Actress: Comedy	Bringing Down the House	Won
2003	Choice Movie: Chemistry	Bringing Down the House	Nominated
2003	Choice Movie: Fight/Action Sequence	Bringing Down the House	Nominated
2003	Choice Movie Breakout Star - Female	Chicago & Bringing Down the House	Nominated
2004	Choice Movie Actress: Comedy	Barbershop 2: Back in Business	Nominated
2005	Choice Movie Actress: Comedy	Beauty Shop	Nominated
2005	Choice Movie: Rap Artist	Beauty Shop	Nominated
2005	Choice Movie: Hissy Fit	Beauty Shop	Nominated
2006	Choice Movie Actress: Comedy	Last Holiday	Nominated
2006	Choice Movie: Liplock	Last Holiday	Nominated
2010	Choice Movie Actress: Romantic Comedy	Valentine's Day	Nominated

== Women Film Critics Circle Awards ==
Year	Category	Title	Result
2004	Special Mention Award	Taxi	Won
2007	Best Music	"Come So Far (Got So Far to Go)" ( from Hairspray)	Won
