= Persona (Queen Latifah album) =

Studio album by Queen Latifah
- Released: August 25, 2009
- Length: 64:48
- Label: Flavor Unit
- Producers: Cool & Dre; the Neptunes

Queen Latifah chronology
| Trav'lin Light (2007) | Persona (2009) |

Singles from Persona
- 1. "Champion" Released: August 7, 2008; 2. "Cue the Rain" Released: March 10, 2009; 3. "Fast Car" Released: September 29, 2009

Persona is the seventh studio album by the American entertainer Queen Latifah. It was released on August 25, 2009, by Flavor Unit Entertainment. The album marked Queen Latifah's first hip-hop project since 2002. Persona includes a mix of Latifah rapping and singing and features guest verses by Missy Elliott, Marsha Ambrosius, Shawn Stockman of Boyz II Men, Busta Rhymes, and Mary J. Blige.

== Background ==
In 2008, Latifah was asked if she would make another hip-hop album. She was quoted saying the album was "already done" and it would be called All Hail the Queen II. It was previously stated that her return-to-hip-hop album would be titled, Negativity and Star.

It was rumoured that the album would be titled "The 'L' Word". When Latifah asked about the rumor, she stated it was her attempt to "mess with people's heads" referring to the rumors that she is lesbian.

On September 12, 2008, Rolling Stone reported that Queen Latifah was working on a new album titled, Persona. The song "Cue the Rain" was released as the album's lead single. The other singles from the album include, "Fast Car", "My Couch" and "With You".

=== Collaborations ===
Dre from production duo Cool & Dre teamed up with her for the song titled, "My Couch". Dre lent his vocals for another track titled, "Hard to Love Ya" alongside Busta Rhymes and Boyz II Men's Shawn Stockman. On July 26, 2009, on her Twitter page, Latifah revealed that the second single from the album would be "Fast Car", which included a remix with Missy Elliott and Lil' Kim.

== Critical reception ==
Professional ratings
Aggregate scores
| Source | Rating |
|---|---|
| Metacritic | 46/100 |
Review scores
| Source | Rating |
| AllMusic | 2.5/5 stars |
| Los Angeles Times | 2.5/4 stars |
| PopMatters | 2/10 stars |
| Rolling Stone | 2/5 stars |

At Metacritic, which assigns a rated mean out of 100 from mainstream critics, Persona received a score of 46, which indicates "mixed or average reviews". Boston Globe critic Ken Capobianco that "Queen Latifah puts the torch songs aside and aims at burning up the clubs with this set of tuneful, briskly executed songs, almost exclusively produced by the superb Cool & Dre [...] For all the pleasures, Latifah sounds too guarded. She reveals more shilling for shedding pounds. More personality in Persona, please." Allison Stewart from The Washington Post noted that "Latifah is usually a towering presence capable of dominating – and redeeming – even the iffiest tracks, but she's operating at a dimmer wattage here. She seems to be observing the proceedings as much as participating, as if she were interested, but not particularly invested, in how it all turns out."

== Chart performance ==
The album debuted at number 25 on the US Billboard 200, selling 18,000 copies in its first week. It also peaked at number three on the US Top R&B/Hip-Hop Albums chart, becoming Queen Latifah's highest-charting album on the chart yet.

== Track listing ==
Persona track listing
| No. | Title | Writer(s) | Producer(s) | Length |
|---|---|---|---|---|
| 1. | "The Light" | Andre Lyon; Marcello Valenzano; Dana Owens | Cool & Dre | 5:04 |
| 2. | "Fast Car" (featuring Missy Elliott) | Lyon; Valenzano; Eddie Montilla; Owens; Melissa Elliott | Cool & Dre | 4:18 |
| 3. | "Cue the Rain" | Lyon; Valenzano; Montilla; Owens; Lindsey Buckingham; Mick Fleetwood; Christine McVie; John McVie; Stevie Nicks | Cool & Dre | 6:02 |
| 4. | "My Couch" (featuring Dre) | Lyon; Valenzano; Montilla; Owens | Cool & Dre | 6:04 |
| 5. | "Take Me Away (With You)" (featuring Marsha Ambrosius) | Lyon; Valenzano; Montilla; Owens; Ambrosius | Cool & Dre; Queen Latifah^{[a]} | 3:45 |
| 6. | "With You" | Lyon; Valenzano; Montilla; Owens | Cool & Dre | 3:57 |
| 7. | "Hard to Love Ya" (featuring Busta Rhymes, Shawn Stockman & Dre) | Lyon; Valenzano; Montilla; Owens; Trevor Tahiem Smith, Jr. | Cool & Dre | 4:14 |
| 8. | "What's the Plan" | Lyon; Valenzano; Montilla; Owens | Cool & Dre | 3:10 |
| 9. | "Long Ass Week" | Lyon; Valenzano; Montilla; Owens | Cool & Dre | 4:11 |
| 10. | "Runnin'" | Lyon; Valenzano; Montilla; Owens | Cool & Dre | 4:03 |
| 11. | "People" (featuring Mary J. Blige) | Lyon; Valenzano; Montilla; Owens; Sean Garrett; Blige; Keith D. Harrison; Sennie "Skip" Martin | Cool & Dre | 3:54 |
| 12. | "If He Wanna" (featuring Serani) | Owens; Pharrell Williams; Craig Serani Marsh | The Neptunes | 4:49 |
| 13. | "Over the Mountain" | Lyon; Valenzano; Montilla; Owens | Cool & Dre; Tashaun "Skitz" Spence^{[a]} | 5:12 |
| 14. | "The World" | Lyon; Valenzano; Montilla; Owens; Kenny Flav | Cool & Dre; Flav^{[a]} | 5:31 |
| Total length: | | | | 64:48 |

Deluxe edition – bonus tracks
| No. | Title | Length |
|---|---|---|
| 15. | "Spotlight" | 3:07 |
| 16. | "Champion" | 3:31 |
| 17. | "Fair Weather Friend" (featuring Ingrid Woode) | 4:22 |
| 18. | "Be Yourself" | 4:18 |

Notes

- ^{^a} signifies a co-producer

Sample credits

- "Cue the Rain" contains resung lyrics from the composition "The Chain" as performed by Fleetwood Mac.
- "People" samples from the composition "I've Been Waiting" as Dazz Band.

== Charts ==
Weekly chart performance for Persona
| Chart (2009) | Peak position |
|---|---|
| US Billboard 200 | 25 |
| US Top R&B/Hip-Hop Albums (Billboard) | 3 |
