= 2004 MTV Movie Awards =

American awards show

- Date: Saturday, June 5, 2004
- Location: Sony Pictures Studios, Culver City, California
- Country: United States
- Hosted by: Lindsay Lohan

Television/radio coverage
- Network: MTV

The 2004 MTV Movie Awards aired on MTV from Sony Pictures Studios in Culver City, California on Saturday, June 5, 2004, hosted by Lindsay Lohan, featured performances by Beastie Boys, D12 and Yeah Yeah Yeahs. The most nominations, six, went to Pirates of the Caribbean: The Curse of the Black Pearl, X2: X-Men United and 50 First Dates followed with four each.

== Performers ==
- Beastie Boys — "Ch-Check It Out"
- Yeah Yeah Yeahs — "Maps"
- D12 — "My Band"

== Presenters ==
- Tom Cruise and Jamie Foxx — presented Best Female Performance
- Vin Diesel and Thandie Newton — presented Best On-Screen Team
- Snoop Dogg and Paris Hilton — presented Best Kiss
- Kate Beckinsale and Mark Ruffalo— presented Best Villain
- Ashton Kutcher — introduced Beastie Boys
- The Rock and Jessica Biel — presented Best Action Sequence
- Jimmy Fallon and Queen Latifah — presented Best Dance Sequence
- Kate Hudson and Matthew Perry — presented Breakthrough Male
- Scarlett Johansson and Jake Gyllenhaal — introduced Yeah Yeah Yeahs
- Ice Cube and Eve — presented Best Fight
- Christina Aguilera and Sharon Stone — presented Breakthrough Female
- Halle Berry — presented Best Male Performance
- Shawn Wayans, Marlon Wayans, and Brittany Murphy — presented Best Comedic Performance
- Lindsay Lohan — introduced D12
- Kirsten Dunst, Ellen DeGeneres, and Tobey Maguire — presented Best Movie

== Awards ==
Below are the list of nominations. Winners are listed at the top of each list in bold.

=== Best Movie ===
The Lord of the Rings: The Return of the King

- Finding Nemo
- 50 First Dates
- Pirates of the Caribbean: The Curse of the Black Pearl
- X2: X-Men United

=== Best Male Performance ===
Johnny Depp – Pirates of the Caribbean: The Curse of the Black Pearl

- Jim Caviezel – The Passion of the Christ
- Tom Cruise – The Last Samurai
- Bill Murray – Lost in Translation
- Adam Sandler – 50 First Dates

=== Best Female Performance ===
Uma Thurman – Kill Bill: Volume 1

- Drew Barrymore – 50 First Dates
- Halle Berry – Gothika
- Queen Latifah – Bringing Down the House
- Charlize Theron – Monster

=== Breakthrough Male ===
Shawn Ashmore – X2

- Shia LaBeouf – Holes
- Ludacris – 2 Fast 2 Furious
- Omarion – You Got Served
- Cillian Murphy – 28 Days Later

=== Breakthrough Female ===
Lindsay Lohan – Freaky Friday

- Jessica Biel – The Texas Chainsaw Massacre
- Scarlett Johansson – Lost in Translation
- Keira Knightley – Pirates of the Caribbean: The Curse of the Black Pearl
- Evan Rachel Wood – Thirteen

=== Best On-Screen Team ===
Adam Sandler and Drew Barrymore – 50 First Dates

- Johnny Depp and Orlando Bloom – Pirates of the Caribbean: The Curse of the Black Pearl
- Jack Black and the School of Rock Band (Aleisha Allen, Caitlin Hale, Joey Gaydos Jr, Kevin Clark, Maryam Hassan, Rebecca Brown, and Robert Tsai) – School of Rock
- Ben Stiller and Owen Wilson – Starsky & Hutch
- Will Smith and Martin Lawrence – Bad Boys II

=== Best Villain ===
Lucy Liu – Kill Bill: Volume 1

- Andrew Bryniarski – The Texas Chainsaw Massacre
- Demi Moore – Charlie's Angels: Full Throttle
- Geoffrey Rush – Pirates of the Caribbean: The Curse of the Black Pearl
- Kiefer Sutherland – Phone Booth

=== Best Comedic Performance ===
Jack Black – School of Rock

- Jim Carrey – Bruce Almighty
- Ellen DeGeneres – Finding Nemo
- Johnny Depp – Pirates of the Caribbean: The Curse of the Black Pearl
- Will Ferrell – Elf

=== Best Kiss ===
Owen Wilson, Carmen Electra and Amy Smart – Starsky & Hutch

- Charlize Theron and Christina Ricci – Monster
- Keanu Reeves and Monica Bellucci – The Matrix Reloaded
- Jim Carrey and Jennifer Aniston – Bruce Almighty
- Shawn Ashmore and Anna Paquin – X2

=== Best Action Sequence ===
Battle at Gondor – The Lord of the Rings: The Return of the King

- Intercoastal Freeway Pursuit – Bad Boys II
- Champion Crane Chase – Terminator 3: Rise of the Machines
- Escape from Mongolia – Charlie's Angels: Full Throttle

=== Best Dance Sequence ===
Seann William Scott — "Maniac / Heaven Is a Place on Earth / Sweet Dreams (Are Made of This) / Venus / The Reflex" (from American Wedding)

- Drew Barrymore, Cameron Diaz, and Lucy Liu — "The Pink Panther Theme" (from Charlie's Angels: Full Throttle)
- Ben Stiller and Jennifer Aniston — "A Gozar Tambino" (from Along Came Polly)
- Steve Martin — "Let Go (Hit the Dancefloor)" (from Bringing Down the House)
- Omarion, Marques Houston, and the Lil' Saint's Dance Crew — "Find Out" (from You Got Served)

=== Best Fight ===
Uma Thurman vs. Chiaki Kuriyama – Kill Bill: Volume 1

- Hugh Jackman vs. Kelly Hu – X2
- Keanu Reeves vs. Hugo Weaving – The Matrix Reloaded
- The Rock vs. Kontiki Rebels – The Rundown
- Queen Latifah vs. Missi Pyle – Bringing Down the House

=== Best Cameo ===
Simon Cowell – Scary Movie 3

- Matt Damon – EuroTrip
- Paul Michael Glaser and David Soul – Starsky & Hutch
- John McEnroe – Anger Management
- Pink – Charlie's Angels: Full Throttle
