= Last Holiday (2006 film) =

2006 American romantic comedy-drama film by Wayne Wang

- Theatrical release poster
- Directed by: Wayne Wang
- Written by: Jeffrey Price; Peter S. Seaman
- Based on: Last Holiday by J.B. Priestley
- Produced by: Laurence Mark; Jack Rapke
- Starring: Queen Latifah; LL Cool J; Timothy Hutton; Gérard Depardieu; Alicia Witt; Giancarlo Esposito
- Cinematography: Geoffrey Simpson
- Edited by: Deirdre Slevin
- Music by: George Fenton
- Production companies: ImageMovers; Laurence Mark Productions
- Distributed by: Paramount Pictures
- Release date: January 13, 2006 (United States)
- Running time: 112 minutes
- Country: United States
- Language: English
- Budget: $45 million
- Box office: $43.3 million

Last Holiday is a 2006 American romantic comedy-drama film directed by Wayne Wang and written by Jeffrey Price and Peter S. Seaman. The film is loosely based on the 1950 British film of the same name by J. B. Priestley. The film stars Queen Latifah as Georgia Byrd, a humble department store assistant who is told that she has a rare brain condition and only has a few weeks to live. She promptly decides to spend her remaining funds on a luxury holiday in Europe before she dies.

Price and Seaman wanted John Candy for the main role but, after Candy's death, Latifah's agent suggested a new version starring her. Produced by Robert Zemeckis' ImageMovers, the film was released by Paramount Pictures on January 13, 2006. The film underperformed at the box office, having grossed $43.3 million against a budget of $45 million and received mixed reviews from critics, though Latifah's performance was universally praised for her charm and humor.

== Plot ==
Georgia Byrd is a shy, unassuming salesperson in the cookware department at Kragen's Department Store in New Orleans and a Baptist choir singer who longs to cook professionally. She privately records her dreams of a better life in a scrapbook labeled "Possibilities" and enjoys replicating TV chef Emeril Lagasse's gourmet recipes, serving her creations to a neighbor while denying herself the pleasure of eating them.

During the Christmas season, while flirting with handsome co-worker Sean Williams, whom she has secretly featured in her scrapbook as her dream husband, Georgia bumps her head. Taken to the store's health center for a CT scan, she is told by the company physician that she has several brain tumors resulting from a rare terminal neurological disorder called Lampington's disease.

As her HMO plan does not cover the high cost of an operation, Georgia resigns herself to having only a few weeks to live. She quits her job, liquidates her assets and savings, and sets off on a dream vacation at the deluxe Grandhotel Pupp in the Czech Republic's spa city of Karlovy Vary.

Free of inhibitions and determined to enjoy the final weeks of her life, Georgia checks into the Presidential Suite and buys a designer wardrobe in expensive boutiques. She then also makes extensive use of the hotel's spa facilities, attempts snowboarding and BASE jumping, enjoys succulent meals prepared by world-renowned Chef Didier, and wins a small fortune playing roulette in the casino.

During her stay, Georgia impresses the hotel's staff, with the exception of the cantankerous guest services manager Ms. Gunther, with her naive manner, forthright kindness, and willingness to try anything without onerous demands. She also attracts the attentions of the other guests, including Matthew Kragen, an arrogant self-help guru and the owner of the department store where she worked; Kragen's assistant/mistress Ms. Burns; and Louisiana power brokers Senator Dillings and Congressman Stewart, who all view her as a wealthy, charismatic woman. Kragen is wary of Georgia and suspects her of trying to sabotage his business, but the rest are charmed by her free spirit.

When Kragen bribes Ms. Gunther to dig up information about Georgia's background, she goes through her hotel suite. She finds a letter Georgia has written providing instructions for the disposal of her remains after her death. Moved by the letter and realizing the reasons behind Georgia's behavior, Ms. Gunther confesses to Georgia she snooped through her belongings and found the letter. She urges Georgia to return home and spend her last days with those she loves.

Taking Ms. Gunther's advice, Georgia heads for the airport but discovers an avalanche has blocked the road. Unbeknownst to her, Sean, having learned of Georgia's diagnosis and ready to acknowledge his long-standing feelings for her, has flown to Europe and is in a taxi on the other side of the snowdrift, blocked from reaching her at the hotel.

Georgia returns to the hotel, and Sean leaves his taxi to hike across the snow on foot. Chef Didier invites her to assist him in the hotel's kitchen that night preparing an extravagant New Year's Eve feast and thanks her publicly at the party. Later, seated at dinner and incensed by the accolades and affection Georgia has received, Kragen tries to humiliate her to his companions by exposing her as a saleswoman in one of his stores, but Georgia confirms this and reveals her terminal illness.

Kragen's companions, disgusted by his insensitivity, embrace her and abandon him. Dejected and embarrassed, Kragen gets drunk, goes to an upper floor of the hotel and sits on the ledge, contemplating suicide. Georgia tries to dissuade this, suggesting if he were nicer and less driven by greed, he would be a happier person.

Sean arrives at the hotel just in time and joins Georgia on the ledge, confessing his affection for her and admitting he'd seen her scrapbook. In the lobby, Ms. Gunther finds a fax for Georgia stating she was misdiagnosed due to a faulty CT scanner and does not have Lampington's disease. Ms. Gunther rushes up to the ledge to announce the good news.

Georgia and Sean return to New Orleans as a couple where they open a restaurant with her casino winnings, Georgia's Joint, which is visited by Chef Didier and Emeril Lagasse.

The end credits reveal what happened to several key characters after the events of the film in the retitled “Realities Book,” with the most important being Georgia and Sean’s wedding while skydiving.

== Cast ==
- Queen Latifah as Georgia Byrd
- LL Cool J as Sean Williams
- Timothy Hutton as Matthew Kragen
- Giancarlo Esposito as Senator Dillings
- Alicia Witt as Ms. Allison Burns
- Gérard Depardieu as Chef Didier
- Jane Adams as Rochelle
- Susan Kellermann as Ms. Gunther
- Ranjit Chowdhry as Dr. Rabindranath Gupta
- Michael Nouri as Congressman Stewart
- Jascha Washington as Darius
- Matt Ross as Mr. Adamian
- Emeril Lagasse as Himself
- Smokey Robinson as Himself

== Production ==
In the original 1950 film, the leading character of George Bird was played by Alec Guinness. Screenwriters Jeffrey Price and Peter S. Seaman (of Who Framed Roger Rabbit and Doc Hollywood fame) updated the story for John Candy, with Carl Reiner directing, but the project was shelved after the actor's death in 1994. Years later, Queen Latifah's agent read their script and suggested they revise it for her.

The gourmet cuisine seen throughout the film was prepared by chefs from the Food Network, and recipes for many of the dishes, including Lobster Salad in Potato Leek Nests, Duck Hash on Toasted Baguette, Spiced Lamb Shanks with Blood Orange Relish, Roasted Quail with Brioche and Chorizo Stuffing, Risotto Barolo with Roasted Vegetables, Bananas Foster and Poulet Tchoupitoulas, were available on the network's website. In one scene, Georgia watches footage from Emeril Live to help her prepare a chicken (Emeril Live Season 9 Episode 49 “Chicken 4 Ways”) As part of the film's promotion, Queen Latifah appeared as a guest on Lagasse's show.

== Reception ==
The film opened on 2,514 screens in the US, earning $12,806,188 and ranking number two in its opening weekend. It eventually grossed $38,399,961 in the US and $4,943,287 in foreign markets for a worldwide box office total of $43,343,248.

The aggregate site Rotten Tomatoes gives the film an approval rating of 56% based on 122 reviews, and an average rating of 5.8/10. The site's critical consensus reads, "Although Queen Latifah's bountiful life-affirming spirit permeates the film, director Wayne Wang is unable to revive this remake with any real flair." Metacritic, which uses a weighted average, assigned the film a score of 52 out of 100, based on 27 critics, indicating "mixed or average" reviews.

Roger Ebert of the Chicago Sun-Times said the film "takes advantage of the great good nature and warmth of Queen Latifah, and uses it to transform a creaky old formula into a comedy that is just plain lovable. To describe the plot is to miss the point, because this plot could have been made into countless movies not as funny and charming as this one ... All depends on the Queen, who has been known to go over the top on occasion, but in this film finds all the right notes and dances to them delightfully. It is good to attend to important cinema like Syriana and Munich, but on occasion we must be open to movies that have more modest ambitions: They only want to amuse us, warm us, and make us feel good. Last Holiday plays like a hug."

Ruthe Stein of the San Francisco Chronicle stated, "Latifah's latest vehicle inexorably marches toward an ending you can see coming from the first reel ... This harmless bit of fluff lacks the element of surprise but is not without random charming moments supplied by its incandescent star."

Jessica Reaves of the Chicago Tribune awarded the film three out of four stars and described Queen Latifah as "soft, bold and very funny, infusing this otherwise predictable movie with a contagious charm." She added, "While this is not exactly a profound film, and the message is hardly new, it's testament to this movie's joyous energy that it doesn't matter in the least. We may know exactly where we're going, but the journey is so much fun, all but the most peevish audience members will find it impossible to complain."

Janet K. Keeler of the St. Petersburg Times graded the film B− and commented, "Strong performances by Latifah, LL Cool J and Depardieu, who is strangely but perfectly cast, save Last Holiday from irrelevance. Latifah is more than the funny girl with attitude we've seen in Bringing Down the House, Taxi and Beauty Shop. She's got the goods to play the leading lady, and a sexy one at that. Latifah's performance here isn't as good as her Oscar-nominated turn in Chicago, but it shows off more range and a subtler touch than subsequent movies."

Queen Latifah was nominated for the NAACP Image Award for Outstanding Actress in a Motion Picture.
