= Flavor Unit Entertainment =

American entertainment company

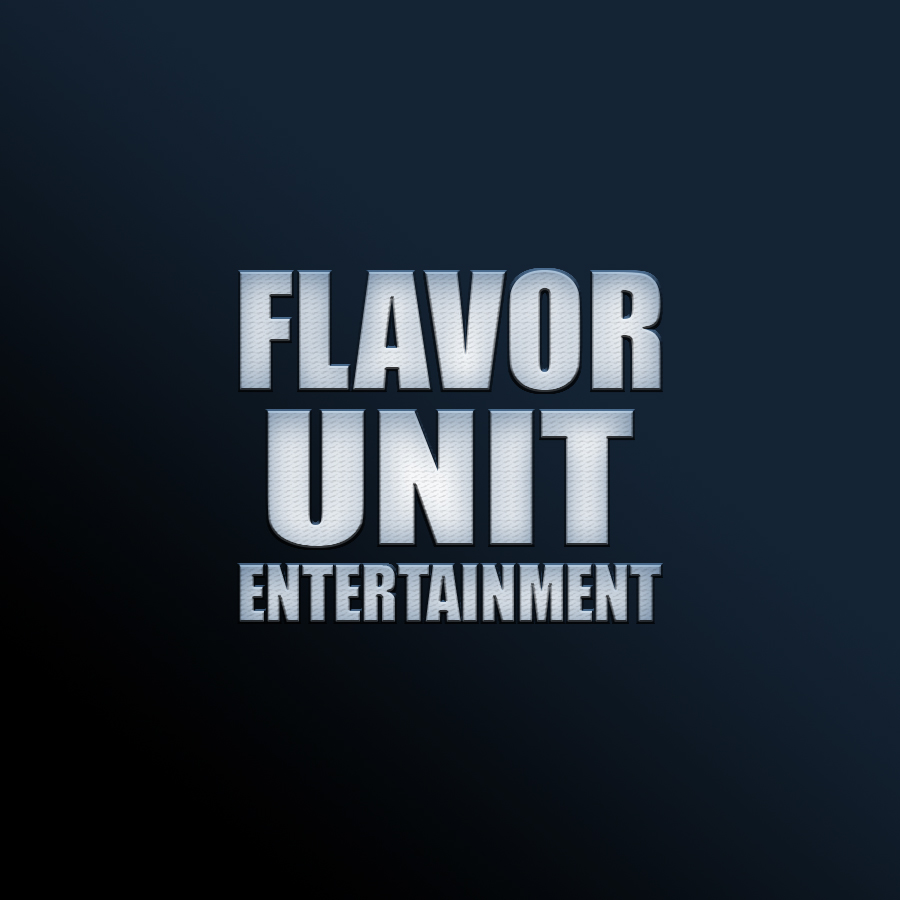
- Type: Private
- Industry: Entertainment
- Founders: Queen Latifah; Shakim Compere
- Headquarters: Miami, Florida, United States
- Products: Motion pictures, music, home entertainment, television production

Flavor Unit Entertainment is an American entertainment company originally launched in Jersey City, New Jersey, but is now based in Miami, Florida, United States. The company was founded by Queen Latifah and Shakim Compere in 1995.

The company produces films and television shows. In February 2013, Netflix signed an exclusive multi-year licensing deal with Flavor Unit Entertainment. Netflix will have its pick of movies produced by Flavor Unit Entertainment to debut on its streaming service.

In April 2014, Flavor Unit Entertainment entered into an exclusive programming partnership with Centric to re-brand the cable television channel as the first network designed for the black woman. The deal includes bringing Flavor Unit Entertainment's Single Ladies to Centric for a fourth season.

On April 26, 2017, MTV announced that they were rebooting the slasher television series Scream in its third season, with a new cast and setting. As part of the reboot process, it was revealed that Brett Matthews would be serving as the main showrunner. In addition, Brett Matthews, Latifah, Shakim Compere, and Yaneley Arty were added as executive producers for the series under Flavor Unit Entertainment. The third season premiered on VH1 on July 8, 2019.

== Filmography ==
Year	Film	Director
2004	The Cookout	Lance Rivera
2005	Beauty Shop	Bille Woodruff
2007	The Perfect Holiday	Lance Rivera
2007	Life Support	Nelson George
2007	Wifey	Reginald Hudlin
2010	Just Wright	Sanaa Hamri
2011	The Cookout 2	Lance Rivera
2012	Steel Magnolias	Kenny Leon
2013	House of Bodies	Alex Merkin
2013	Percentage	Alex Merkin
2015	Brotherly Love	Jamal Hill
2015	Bessie	Dee Rees
2015	November Rule	Mike Elliott
2016	The Real MVP: The Wanda Durant Story	Nelson George
2017	Deuces	Jamal Hill

== Television ==
Year	Television	Notes
1999–2001	The Queen Latifah Show	In association with Telepictures Productions
2011–2014	Let's Stay Together	In association with Cofer Entertainment Group (BET Originals)
2011–2015	Single Ladies	
2012	The Star Next Door	In association with 25/7 Productions and Raquel Productions
2012	The Next	In association with 25/7 Productions and Raquel Productions
2013–2015	The Queen Latifah Show	In association with Sony Pictures Television
2019	Scream: Resurrection	Season 3; In association with DiGa Vision
2021–2025	The Equalizer	In association with Universal Television and CBS Studios
