= The Perfect Holiday =

- Theatrical release poster
- Directed by: Lance Rivera
- Written by: Jeff Stein; Lance Rivera; Marc Calixte; Nat Mauldin
- Produced by: Joseph P. Genier; Leifur B. Dagfinnsson; Marvin Peart; Mike Elliott; Queen Latifah; Shakim Compere
- Starring: Morris Chestnut; Gabrielle Union; Charlie Murphy; Katt Williams; Faizon Love; Terrence Howard; Queen Latifah
- Cinematography: Teodoro Maniaci
- Edited by: Paul Trejo
- Music by: Christopher Lennertz
- Production companies: Capital Arts Entertainment; True North Productions; Flavor Unit Entertainment
- Distributed by: Yari Film Group; Freestyle Releasing; Destination Films
- Release date: December 12, 2007
- Running time: 96 minutes
- Country: United States
- Language: English
- Budget: $20 million
- Box office: $5.8 million

The Perfect Holiday is a 2007 American comedy film directed by Lance Rivera, starring Gabrielle Union, Morris Chestnut, Charlie Murphy, and Terrence Howard, and is produced by Academy Award-nominated actress Queen Latifah, who also serves as narrator.

The film was released on December 12, 2007. It was also the first film by Destination Films to receive a wide release since Beautiful.

== Plot ==
Benjamin (Morris Chestnut) is an aspiring songwriter who attempts to break into the music business by giving a copy of his recording track of a Christmas album to a rap artist named J-Jizzy (Charles Q. Murphy). Nancy (Union) is a divorced mother, who is too busy taking care of her three children to take care of herself. Her daughter Emily (Khail Bryant) overhears her mother say that she wished for a compliment from a man, and the daughter tells the local mall's Santa Claus about her mother's wish.

The Santa Claus turns out to be Benjamin, who notices Nancy. Later, while sitting in a Starbucks after his shift as Santa, Benjamin and his friend Jamal (Faizon Love) see Nancy go into a dry cleaners. Benjamin borrows Jamal's jacket, pretends to drop it off at the cleaners, tells Nancy that she's a very attractive woman (granting her wish), and leaves. Eventually, the two start to date and end up falling in love—without Ben realizing that Nancy's ex-husband is J-Jizzy.

Things take a turn for the worse, however, because Nancy's oldest son, John-John (Malik Hammond) is jealous of Benjamin going out with his mother and plots to break up the relationship. What follows is a series of funny and touching scenes that show viewers what "family" is really about.

Queen Latifah and Terrence Howard play omniscient roles in the movie. Howard is a mischievous and sly angel named "Bah Humbug", while Latifah is the kind, thoughtful angel, called "Mrs. Christmas".

== Cast ==
- Gabrielle Union as Nancy Taylor
- Morris Chestnut as Benjamin Armstrong
- Charlie Murphy as J-Jizzy
- Malik Hammond as John-John Taylor
- Jeremy Gumbs as Mikey Taylor
- Khail Bryant as Emily Taylor
- Faizon Love as Jamal
- Jill Marie Jones as Robin
- Katt Williams as Delicious
- Queen Latifah as Mrs. Christmas
- Rachel True as Brenda
- Terrence Howard as Bah Humbug

== Reception ==
On the review aggregator website Rotten Tomatoes, 19% of 58 critics' reviews are positive, with an average rating of 3.9/10. The website's consensus reads: "The Perfect Holiday is the perfect example of Christmas movie clichés run amok." Metacritic, which uses a weighted average, assigned the film a score of 32 out of 100, based on 22 critics, indicating "generally unfavorable" reviews.

On its opening weekend, it opened poorly at #6 with $2.2 million. The film grossed $5.8 million domestically.
