= The Dana Owens Album =

Studio album by Queen Latifah
- Released: September 28, 2004
- Studios: Avatar Studios, Nervous Music, NuNoise Studio, Right Track Recording (New York City, New York); Capitol Studios, Conway Studios, Henson Recording Studios, Record Plant Studios (Los Angeles, California); O'Henry Studios (Burbank, California)
- Genres: Jazz; soul; R&B
- Length: 68:12
- Labels: Flavor Unit; Creative Battery; AEG Live; A&M
- Producers: Ron Fair; Tal Herzberg; Arif Mardin; Joe Mardin; Mervyn Warren

Queen Latifah chronology
She's a Queen: A Collection of Hits (2002)	The Dana Owens Album (2004)	Trav'lin' Light (2007)

The Dana Owens Album is the fifth studio album by American hip-hop artist Queen Latifah. The album was released on September 28, 2004, through A&M Records. The album marks a departure from her previous hip-hop releases, and is composed of jazz, soul, and R&B covers of songs by artists such as Al Green, Bill Withers, and Screamin' Jay Hawkins, among others. The album reached No. 16 on the Billboard 200 and No. 11 on the Top R&B/Hip-Hop Albums chart.

== Overview ==
The Dana Owens Album is a cover album of jazz and R&B songs entitled after Latifah's birth name, Dana Elaine Owens. Unlike Latifah's previous hip-hop/R&B-oriented albums, this album showcases a jazz vocal performance.

The LP earned a Grammy nomination in 2005 in the category of Best Jazz Vocal Album. The album has also been certified gold in the United States by the Recording Industry Association of America (RIAA).

== Critical reception ==
Professional ratings
Review scores
Source	Rating
AllMusic	4/5 stars
Blender	3/5 stars
Robert Christgau	(dud)
New York Post	4/4 stars
Now	3/5 Ns
Rolling Stone	2/5 stars

AllMusic editor Andy Kellman wrote: "Through and through, this is a real delight — very classy and a whole lot of fun. Owens has been a busy woman the past several years, whether in front of a camera or behind the scenes, but she really ought to consider doing this type of thing more often." Pat Blashill, writing for Rolling Stone, felt that with The Dana Owens Album Queen Latifah "doesn't take many chances: It's as warm and familiar as a new down comforter. For some Norah Jones fans, that may be enough."

== Track listing ==
1. "Baby Get Lost" (Leonard Feather) – 3:42
2. "I Put a Spell on You" (Screamin' Jay Hawkins) – 3:08
3. "Simply Beautiful" (Al Green) – 4:11
4. "The Same Love That Made Me Laugh" (Bill Withers) – 3:53
5. "Moody's Mood for Love" (James Moody, Dorothy Fields, Jimmy McHugh) – 3:59
6. "Close Your Eyes" (Bernice Petkere) – 2:55
7. "California Dreamin'" (John Phillips, Michelle Phillips) – 3:42
8. "Hard Times" (Stony Browder, August Darnell) – 5:21
9. "Mercy, Mercy, Mercy" (Gail Fisher, Vincent Levy, Joe Zawinul) – 3:27
10. "Hello Stranger" (Barbara Lewis) – 3:00
11. "If I Had You" (Jimmy Campbell, Reginald Connelly, Ted Shapiro) – 4:04
12. "Lush Life" (Billy Strayhorn) – 4:25

== Personnel ==
Main personnel

- Queen Latifah – vocals
- Bryant Breyers – trombone
- Pete Christlieb – saxophone
- Vinnie Colaiuta – drums
- Luis Conte – percussion
- Jim Cox – Fender Rhodes, piano, Wurlitzer
- Charles Davis – trumpet
- Peter Erskine – drums
- Brandon Fields – saxophone
- John Goux – guitar
- Gary Grant – horn, trumpet
- Dan Higgins – horn, saxophone
- Larry Lunetta – trumpet
- Richard Taylor "Dick" Nash – trombone
- David "Fathead" Newman – vocals
- Bruce Otto – trombone
- Joel Peskin – saxophone
- Mervyn Warren – piano, scat

Guest artists

- Al Green – vocals
- Herbie Hancock – piano
- James Moody – alto saxophone

Session musicians

- Nico Abondolo – string bass
- Robert Adcock – cello
- Eun Mee Ahn – violin
- Richard Altenbach – violin
- Jerry Barnes – bass
- Sherrod Barnes – guitar
- Robert Becker – viola
- Emily Bernstein – clarinet
- Gary Bias – saxophone
- Charlie Bisharat – violin
- Tom Boyd – oboe
- Jacqueline Brand – violin
- Denyse Buffum – viola
- Bob Burns, Jr. – trumpet
- Darius Campo – violin
- Roberto Cani – violin
- Tim Carmon – organ
- Lily Ho Chen – violin
- Ronald Clark – violin
- Jon Clarke – English horn
- Durell Coleman – backing vocals
- Larry Corbett – cello
- Brian Dembow – viola
- Joel Derouin – violin
- Yvette Devereaux – violin
- Bruce Dukov – violin
- Arni Egilsson – string bass
- Stephen Erdody – cello
- Charles Everett – violin
- Marlow Fisher – viola
- Samuel Formicola – viola
- Matthew Funes – viola
- Armen Garabedian – violin
- Berj Garabedia – violin
- Tom Garvin – piano
- Gordon Gottlieb – percussion
- Endre Granat – violin
- Alan Grunfeld – violin
- Omar Hakim – drums
- Tamara Hatwan – violin
- Jerry Hey – horn
- Paul Jackson, Jr. – guitar
- Patricia Johnson – violin
- Will Kennedy – drums
- Peter Kent – violin
- Robbie Kondor – piano
- Armen Ksadjikian – cello
- Songa Lee – violin
- Natalie Leggett – violin
- Mario de León – violin
- Jay Leonhart – bass
- Phillip Levy – violin
- Dan Little – cello
- David Low – cello
- Rene Mandel – violin
- Andrew Martin – trombone
- Arnold McCuller – backing vocals
- Raul Midón – acoustic guitar, background vocals
- Ricky Minor – bass
- Victoria Miskolczy – viola
- Shedrick Mitchell – organ
- Horia Moroaica – violin
- Ralph Morrison III – violin
- Lewis Nash – drums
- Dan Neufeld – viola
- Robin Olson – violin
- Sid Page – violin
- Sara Parkins – violin
- John Patitucci – bass
- Valerie Pinkston – background vocals
- Katia Popov – violin
- Joe Porcaro – percussion
- William Frank "Bill" Reichenbach Jr. – horn
- Kevin Ricard – percussion
- Emil Richards – vibraphone
- John "J.R." Robinson – drums
- Ralph Rolle – drums
- Gil Romero – violin
- James Ross – viola
- Sheldon Sanov – violin
- David Shamban – cello
- Harry Shirinian – viola
- Jackie Simley – background vocals
- Steve Skinner – vibraphone
- Pamela Sklar – bass flute
- Neil Stubenhaus – bass
- Cecilia Tsan – cello
- Mari Tsumura – violin
- Louise di Tullio – flute
- Michael Valerio – bass
- Josefina Vergara – violin
- Frank Vignola – guitar
- Ian Walker – string bass
- Larry E. Williams – Saxophone
- Lloyd Williams – background vocals
- Reggie C. Young – trombone

== Charts ==
=== Weekly charts ===
Weekly chart performance for The Dana Owens Album
Chart (2004)	Peak position
Canadian Albums (Nielsen SoundScan)	159
Canadian R&B Albums (Nielsen SoundScan)	35
US Billboard 200	16
US Top R&B/Hip-Hop Albums (Billboard)	11

=== Year-end charts ===
Year-end chart performance for The Dana Owens Album
Chart (2005)	Position
US Billboard 200	187
US Top R&B/Hip-Hop Albums (Billboard)	65

== Certifications ==
Certifications for The Dana Owens Album
Region	Certification	Certified units/sales
United States (RIAA)	Gold	500,000^{^}
^{^} Shipments figures based on certification alone.
