= Queen Latifah =

American rapper and actress (born 1970)

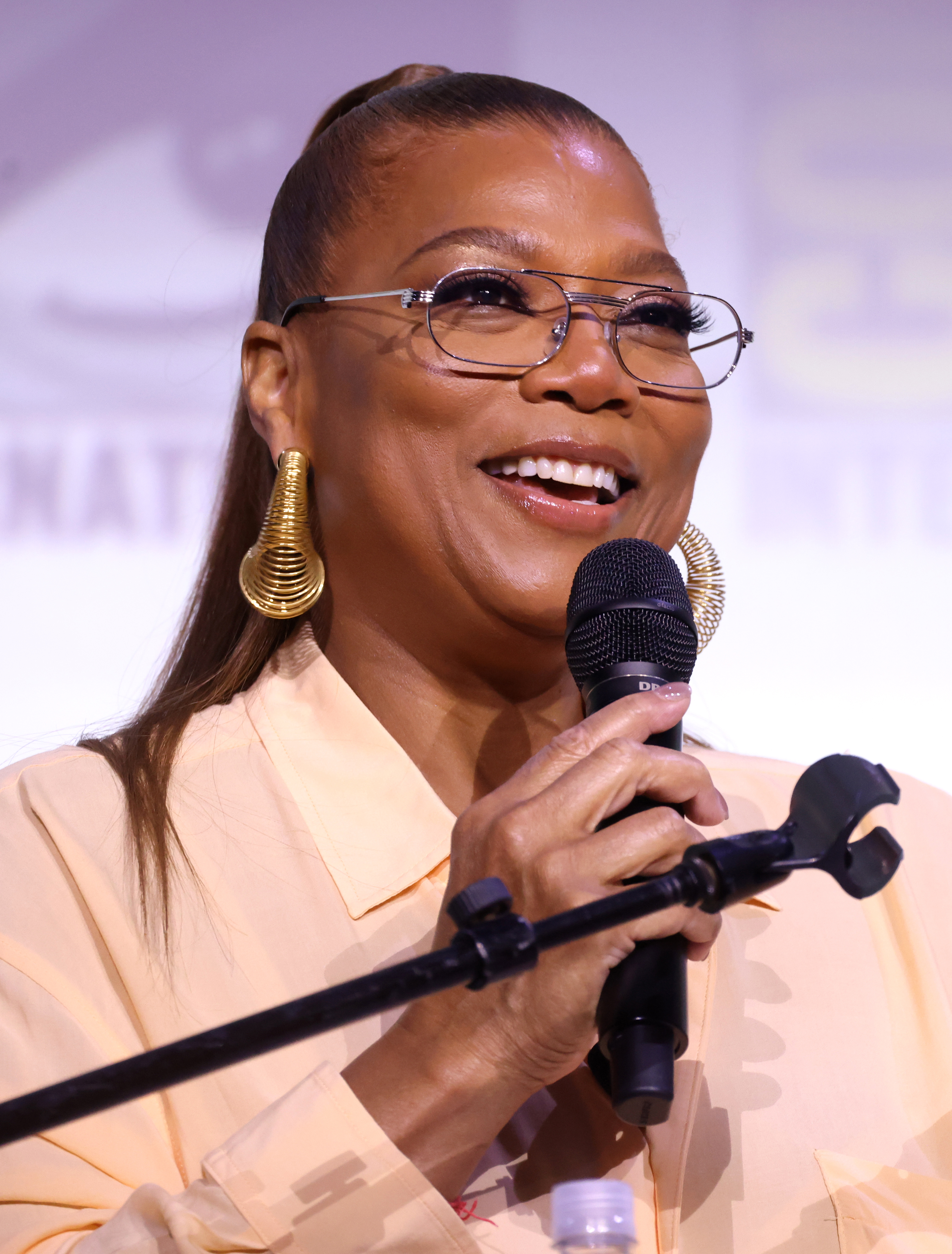
- Latifah in 2025
- Born: Dana Elaine Owens; March 18, 1970 (age 56); Newark, New Jersey, U.S.
- Occupations: Rapper; songwriter; singer; actress; film producer; talk show host
- Years active: 1988–present
- Children: 1
- Awards: Full list
- Musical career
- Origin: East Orange, New Jersey, U.S.; Irvington, New Jersey, U.S.
- Genres: Hip-hop; progressive rap; R&B; soul; jazz; gospel; dance
- Instruments: Vocals
- Labels: Verve; A&M; Interscope; Motown; PolyGram; Tommy Boy; Warner Bros.; Disney
- Website: www.queenlatifah.com

Dana Elaine Owens (born March 18, 1970), known professionally by her stage name Queen Latifah, is an American rapper, actress, and singer. She has received various accolades, including a Grammy Award, a Primetime Emmy Award, a Golden Globe Award, three Actor Awards, and two NAACP Image Awards, in addition to a nomination for an Academy Award. In 2006, she became the first hip-hop artist to receive a star on the Hollywood Walk of Fame. Latifah was inducted in the Rock and Roll Hall of Fame in 2026 through the musical influence category.

At age 19, Latifah released her debut album All Hail the Queen (1989), featuring the hit single "Ladies First". Her second album Nature of a Sista' (1991), was produced by Tommy Boy Records. Her third album, Black Reign (1993), became the first album by a solo female rapper to receive a gold certification from the Recording Industry Association of America (RIAA), and spawned the single "U.N.I.T.Y.", which was influential in raising awareness of violence against women and the objectification of Black female sexuality. The track reached the top 40 on the Billboard Hot 100, and won a Grammy Award. Her fourth album Order in the Court (1998), was released with Motown Records. She has since released the albums The Dana Owens Album (2004), Trav'lin' Light (2007), and Persona (2009).

Latifah starred as Khadijah James on the Fox sitcom Living Single from 1993 to 1998 and landed a leading role in the action film Set It Off (1996). She created the daytime talk show The Queen Latifah Show, which ran from 1999 to 2001, and again from 2013 to 2015, in syndication. Her portrayal of Matron "Mama" Morton in the musical film Chicago (2002) received a nomination for the Academy Award for Best Supporting Actress. She has also starred or co-starred in the films Bringing Down the House (2003), Taxi (2004), Barbershop 2: Back in Business (2005), Beauty Shop (2005), Last Holiday (2006), Hairspray (2007), Joyful Noise (2012), 22 Jump Street (2014), and Girls Trip (2017); and provided voice work in the Ice Age film series since 2006.

Latifah received critical acclaim for her portrayal of blues singer Bessie Smith in the HBO film Bessie (2015), which she co-produced, winning the Primetime Emmy Award for Outstanding Television Movie. From 2016 to 2019, she starred as Carlotta Brown in the musical drama series Star. In 2020, she portrayed Hattie McDaniel in the miniseries Hollywood. She portrayed the lead role on CBS's revival of the action drama The Equalizer, which aired five seasons from 2021 through 2025.

In 2026, Latifah was inducted into the Rock and Roll Hall of Fame. In late 2026, Latifah debuted as a coach on the thirtieth season of NBC's The Voice.

== Early life ==
Dana Elaine Owens was born in Newark, New Jersey, on March 18, 1970, and lived primarily in East Orange, New Jersey. She is the daughter of Rita Lamae (née Bray; d. 2018), a teacher at Irvington High School (Dana's alma mater), and Lancelot Amos Owens, a police officer. Her parents divorced when she was ten.

She was raised in the Baptist faith. She attended Catholic school in Newark, New Jersey and Essex Catholic Girls' High School in Irvington but graduated from Irvington High School. After high school, she attended classes at Borough of Manhattan Community College.

She found her stage name, Latifah (لطيفة laṭīfa), meaning "delicate" and "very kind" in Arabic, in a book of Arabic names when she was eight. Always tall, the 5-foot-10-inch (1.78 m) Dana was a power forward on her high school basketball team. She performed the number "Home" from the musical The Wiz in a grammar school play.

== Music career ==
=== 1988–1989: Career beginnings ===
She began beat boxing for the hip-hop group Ladies Fresh and was an original member of the Flavor Unit, which, at that time, was a crew of MCs grouped around producer DJ King Gemini. DJ King Gemini made a demo recording of Queen Latifah's rap song Princess of the Posse, which he gave to Fab 5 Freddy, the host of Yo! MTV Raps. The song got the attention of Tommy Boy Music employee Dante Ross, who signed Latifah and in 1989 released her first single, "Wrath of My Madness". More recent artists, like Ice Cube and Lil' Kim, would go on to sample Latifah's track in their songs "You Can't Play With My Yo-Yo" and "Wrath of Kim's Madness" respectively in later years. Latifah has a two-octave vocal range. She is considered a contralto, with the ability to both rap and sing.

=== 1989–2002: Rap and hip-hop ===
Latifah made her mark in hip-hop by rapping about issues black women face. She wrote songs about topics including domestic violence, street harassment, and troubled relationships. Freddy helped Latifah sign with Tommy Boy Records, which released Latifah's first album All Hail the Queen in 1989, when she was nineteen. That year, she appeared as Referee on the UK label Music of Life album 1989 – The Hustlers Convention (live). She received a Candace Award from the National Coalition of 100 Black Women in 1992. The single "Ladies First" featuring Monie Love became the first collaborative track by two female rappers not in a group. In 1993, she released the album Black Reign, which was certified Gold in the United States and produced the Grammy Award-winning song "U.N.I.T.Y.". In 1998, co-produced by Ro Smith, now CEO of Def Ro Inc., she released her fourth hip-hop album Order in the Court, which was released by Motown Records. Latifah was also a member of the hip-hop collective Native Tongues.

Latifah performed in the Super Bowl XXXII halftime show, making her the first rapper to do so.

=== 2003–2009: Change to traditional singing ===
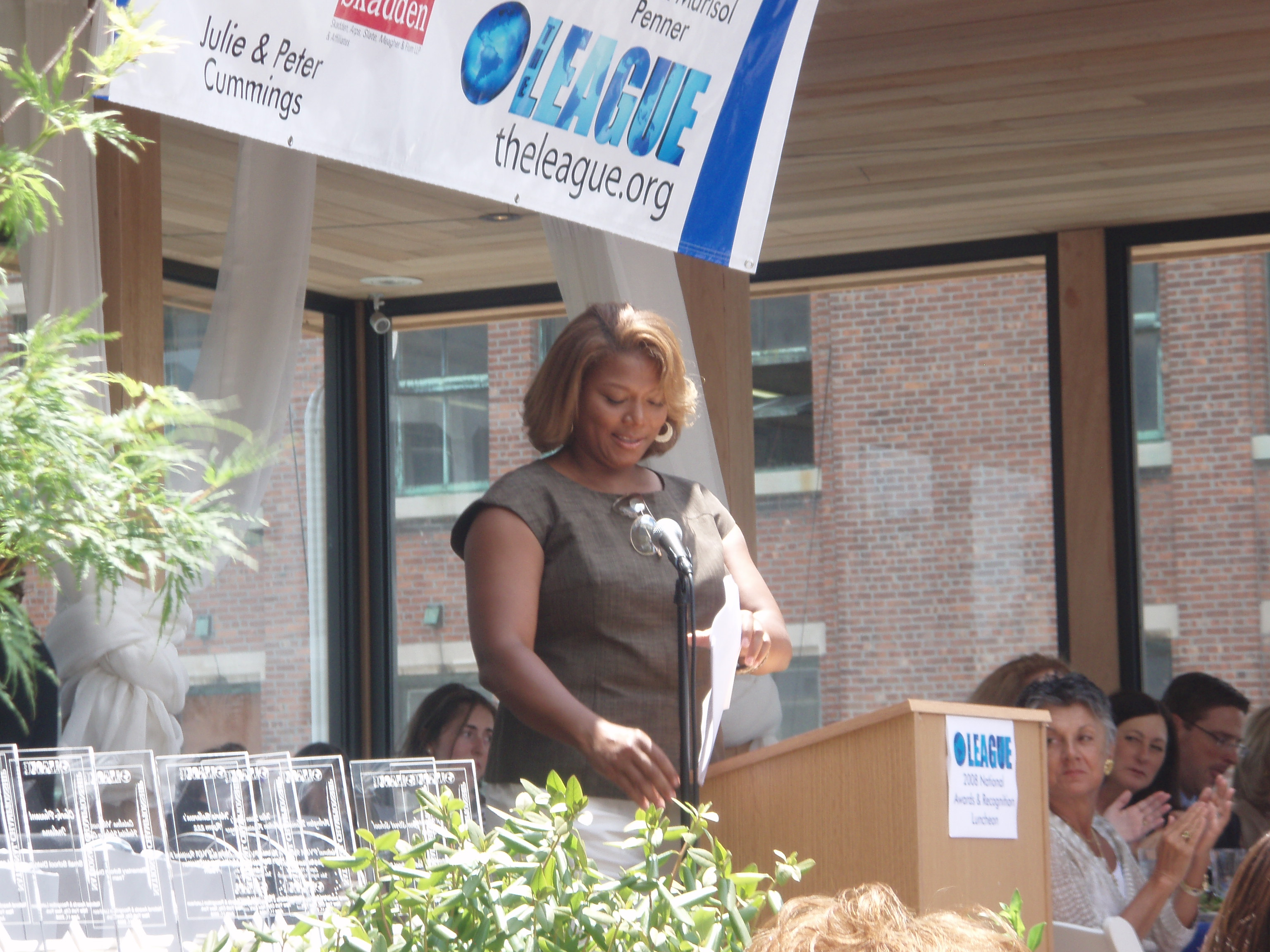
Queen Latifah hosts LEAGUE National Awards and Recognition Luncheon 2008

After Order in the Court, Latifah shifted primarily to singing soul music and jazz standards, which she had used sparingly in her previous hip-hop-oriented records. In 2004, she released the soul/jazz standards The Dana Owens Album. On July 11, 2007, Latifah sang at the famed Hollywood Bowl in Los Angeles as the headlining act in a live jazz concert. In front of a crowd of more than 12,400, she was backed by a 10-piece live orchestra, which was billed as the Queen Latifah Orchestra, and three backup vocalists. Latifah performed new arrangements of standards including "California Dreaming", first made popular by 1960s icons the Mamas & the Papas. Later in 2007, Latifah released an album titled Trav'lin' Light. Jill Scott, Erykah Badu, Joe Sample, George Duke, Christian McBride, and Stevie Wonder made guest appearances. The album was nominated for a Grammy in the "Best Traditional Pop Vocal Album" category.

In 2009, Latifah, along with the NJPAC Jubilation Choir, recorded the title track on the album Oh, Happy Day: An All-Star Music Celebration, covering the song that the Edwin Hawkins Singers made popular in 1969.

=== 2008–present: Return to hip-hop ===
In 2008, Latifah was asked if she would make another hip-hop album. She was quoted stating that the album was done already and it would be called All Hail the Queen II. The following year, in 2009, she released her album Persona. The song "Cue the Rain" was released as the album's lead single. 2011 saw Queen Latifah sing "Who Can I Turn To" in a duet with Tony Bennett for his album Duets II. In January 2012, while appearing on 106 & Park with Dolly Parton, to promote Joyful Noise, Latifah stated that she had been working on a new album.

== Film and television ==
=== 1991–2001: Early career ===
She began her film career by having supporting roles in the 1991 and 1992 films House Party 2, Juice and Jungle Fever. Moreover, she has guest starred in two episodes during the second season (1991–1992) of the NBC hit The Fresh Prince of Bel-Air and had a guest role as herself on the ABC sitcom Hangin' with Mr. Cooper in 1993. From 1993 to 1998, Latifah had a starring role on Living Single, the FOX sitcom, which gained high ratings among black audiences; she also wrote and performed its theme song. Her mother Rita played her mother on-screen. Latifah appeared in the 1996 box-office hit, Set It Off, and had a supporting role in the Holly Hunter film Living Out Loud (1998). She played the role of Thelma in the 1999 movie The Bone Collector, alongside Denzel Washington and Angelina Jolie. She also had her own talk show, The Queen Latifah Show, from 1999 to 2001 and revamped in 2013. On January 6, 2014, The Queen Latifah Show was renewed for a second season. However, on November 21, 2014, Sony Pictures Television canceled Latifah's show due to declining ratings. Production of the series closed down, taking effect on December 18, 2014, leaving new episodes that were broadcast until March 6, 2015.

=== 2002–present: Mainstream success ===
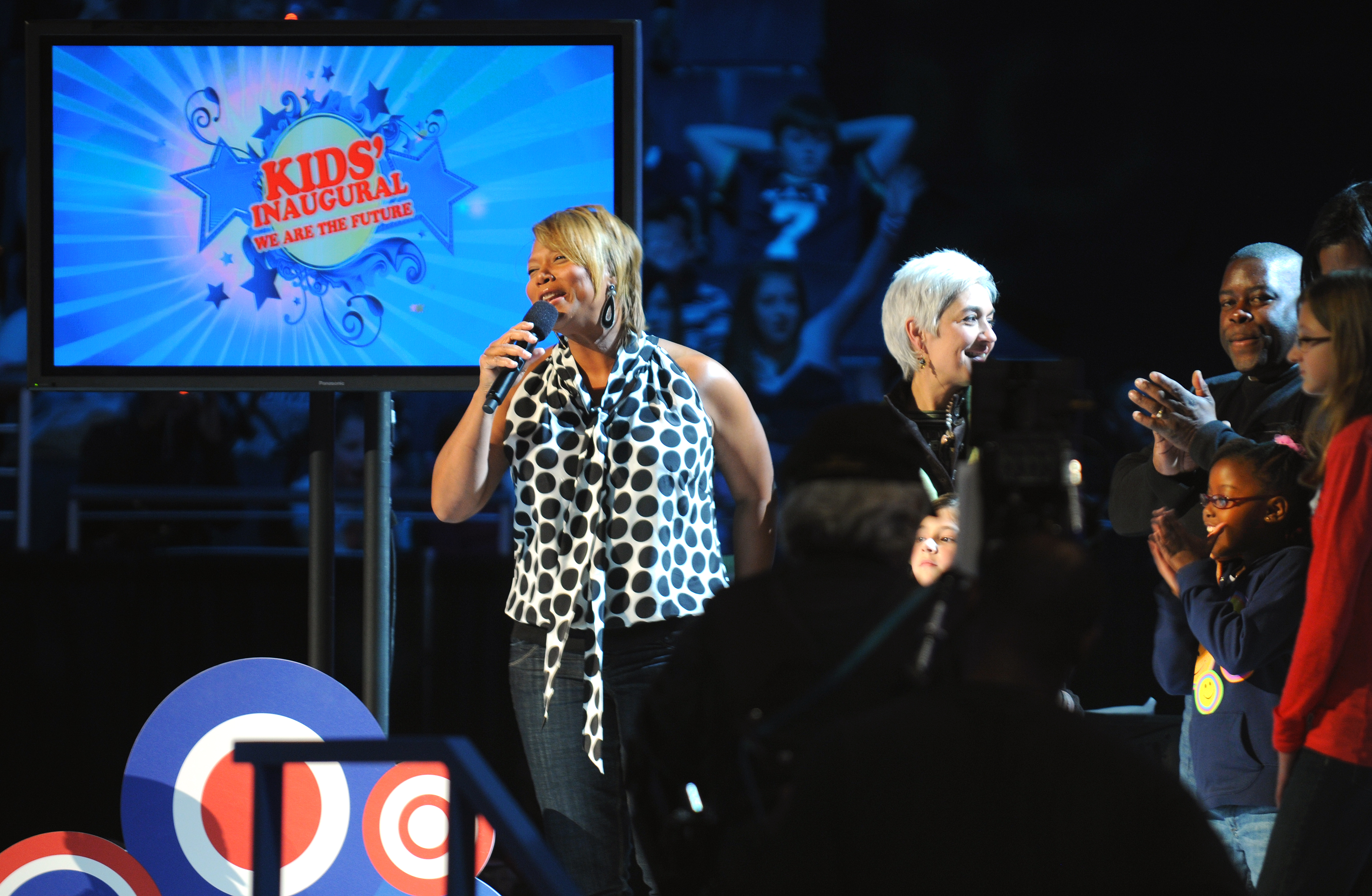
Queen Latifah performing at the "Kids Inaugural: We Are the Future" concert in 2009

Although Latifah had previously received some critical acclaim, she gained mainstream success after being cast as Matron "Mama" Morton in Chicago, a musical film that won the Academy Award for Best Picture. Latifah herself received the nomination for Best Supporting Actress for her role, but lost to co-star Catherine Zeta-Jones. Latifah is one of five hip-hop/R&B artists to receive an Academy Award nomination in an acting category. (Note: The others are Will Smith (Best Actor, Ali, 2001, and The Pursuit of Happyness, 2006), Jennifer Hudson (Best Supporting Actress, Dreamgirls, 2007), Jamie Foxx, (Best Actor, Ray, and Best Supporting Actor Collateral, both in 2004, also winning the first) and Mary J. Blige (Best Supporting Actress, Mudbound, 2017).)

In 2003, she starred with Steve Martin in the film Bringing Down the House, which was a major success at the box office. She also recorded a song "Do Your Thing" for the soundtrack. Since then, she has had both leading and supporting roles in a multitude of films that received varied critical and box office receptions, including films such as Kung Faux (2003), Scary Movie 3 (2003), Barbershop 2: Back in Business (2004), Taxi (2004), and Beauty Shop (2005).

On January 4, 2006, Queen Latifah received a star on the Hollywood Walk of Fame, located at 6915 Hollywood Blvd. In early 2006, Latifah appeared in a romantic comedy/drama entitled Last Holiday. Film critic Richard Roeper stated that "this is the Queen Latifah performance I've been waiting for ever since she broke into movies". Also in 2006, Latifah voiced Ellie, a friendly mammoth, in the animated film, Ice Age: The Meltdown (her first voice appearance in an animated film), and appeared in the drama Stranger Than Fiction.

The summer of 2007, Latifah performed in Hairspray, the film adaptation of the hit Broadway musical. The film – in which she acted, sang, and danced – rated highly with critics. Also in 2007, she portrayed an HIV-positive woman in the film Life Support, a role for which she garnered her first Golden Globe Award, Screen Actors Guild Award and an Emmy nomination.

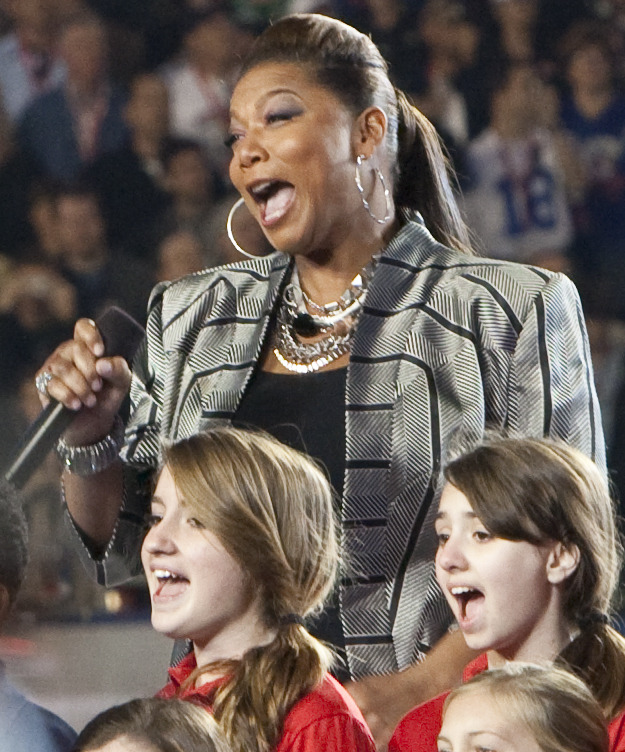
Latifah performing God Bless America at Super Bowl XLIV in 2010

Queen Latifah produced the 2007 film The Perfect Holiday. In addition to producing the film, Latifah starred alongside Terrence Howard, Morris Chestnut, Gabrielle Union, Charles Q. Murphy, Jill Marie Jones, and Faizon Love. In 2008, Latifah appeared in the crime comedy Mad Money opposite Academy Award–winner Diane Keaton as well as Katie Holmes and Ted Danson. She appeared on Saturday Night Live on October 4, 2008, as moderator Gwen Ifill in a comedic sketch depicting the vice-presidential debate between then-Senator Joe Biden and then-Governor Sarah Palin and played in The Secret Life of Bees. In 2009, Latifah was a presenter at the 81st Academy Awards, presenting the segment honoring film professionals who had died during 2008 and singing "I'll Be Seeing You" during the montage. Latifah spoke at Michael Jackson's memorial service in Los Angeles. She also hosted the 2010 People's Choice Awards. Latifah sang "America the Beautiful" at Super Bowl XLIV hosted in Miami, Florida, on February 7, 2010, with Carrie Underwood. Latifah hosted the 2010 BET Awards on June 27, 2010. She starred with Dolly Parton in Joyful Noise (2012). In June 2011, Latifah received an honorary doctorate degree in Humane Letters from Delaware State University in Dover, Delaware. On September 16, 2013, Latifah premiered her own syndicated daytime television show titled The Queen Latifah Show. On January 26, 2014, Latifah officiated the weddings of 33 same-sex and opposite-sex couples during a performance of "Same Love" by Macklemore at the 56th Annual Grammy Awards. In June 2014, she appeared as Mrs. Dickson in the action-comedy film 22 Jump Street. In 2015, Latifah received a Best Actress Emmy nomination for her lead role as Bessie Smith in Bessie, an HBO film which received a total of 12 Emmy nominations.

In 2017, Latifah starred in the hit comedy film Girls Trip. On April 26, 2017, MTV announced that Latifah would be an executive producer for the third season of the slasher television series Scream. The show would undergo a reboot with a new cast and Brett Matthews serving as show runner. In addition, Matthews, Shakim Compere and Yaneley Arty would also be credited as executive producers for the series under Flavor Unit Entertainment. The third season titled Scream: Resurrection premiered on VH1 on July 8, 2019.

In 2019, Latifah played the sea witch Ursula in The Little Mermaid Live!. Although the production itself was not well received, critics widely praised Latifah's performance, with The Hollywood Reporter calling her performance "the best moment of the evening".

In 2021, CBS premiered the new active TV series, The Equalizer, a reboot of the 1980s detective series of the same name, starring Latifah in the lead role (renamed as Robyn for her version). More recently, she signed a deal with Audible.

== Artistry ==
Latifah's music usually contains hip-hop, jazz and gospel and has the elements of R&B, soul, and dance. She possesses a two-octave vocal range. Queen Latifah is a contralto, and she has the ability to rap and sing. Her biggest musical influences are EPMD, KRS-One, LL Cool J, Public Enemy, and Run–D.M.C. She also cites Bessie Smith as one of her influences.

Al Hail the Queen features hip-hop, reggae, soulful back-up vocals, boppish scatting, snappy horn back-ups, and house music. She described the work as "a creative outlet... and sometimes it can become like a newspaper that people read with their ears."

Early in her career, Queen Latifah's lyrics were described as woman-centered and Afrocentric. The rapper often used Afrocentric attires during public appearances and music videos, looks that became her trademark. In 1990, The New York Times' Michelle Wallace described her art as "politically sophisticated", which "seems worlds apart from the adolescent, buffoonish sex orientation of most rap." For AllMusic, her "strong, intelligent, no-nonsense" persona made her "arguably the first MC who could properly be described as feminist". Queen Latifah did not identify as a feminist at the time, and expressed that her music was not exclusive for the female audience. On the topic, author Tricia Rose wrote that Black female rappers likely did not identify with feminism during that time because it was perceived as a movement that focused primarily on white women's issues.

== Products and endorsements ==
Latifah is a celebrity spokesperson for CoverGirl cosmetics, Curvation women's underwear, Pizza Hut, and Jenny Craig. She represents her own line of cosmetics for women of color called the CoverGirl Queen Collection. Latifah has also launched a perfume line called "Queen" and "Queen of Hearts". On May 23, 2018, Latifah was named the godmother of Carnival Cruise Lines' vessel Carnival Horizon. Apart from singing, Queen Latifah has written a book on confidence and self-respect called Ladies First: Revelations of a Strong Woman.

== Personal life ==
Raised in East Orange, New Jersey, Latifah has been a resident of Colts Neck, New Jersey; Rumson, New Jersey; and Beverly Hills, California.

Latifah's older brother, Lancelot Jr., was killed in 1992 in an accident involving a motorcycle that Latifah had purchased for him. A 2006 interview revealed that Latifah still wore the key to the motorcycle around her neck, visible throughout her performance in her sitcom Living Single. In 1995, Latifah was the victim of a carjacking, which also resulted in the non-fatal shooting of her bodyguard, Sean Moon.

In 1996, she was arrested and charged with possession of marijuana and possession of a loaded handgun. In 2002, she was arrested for driving under the influence in Los Angeles County. She was placed on three years' probation after being convicted.

On March 21, 2018, her mother, actress Rita Owens, died due to heart failure, an issue she had been battling since 2004.

Latifah long refused to address speculation around her sexuality and personal life, telling The New York Times in 2008 that "I don't feel like I need to share my personal life, and I don't care if people think I'm gay or not". At the BET Awards 2021, during her acceptance speech for the Lifetime Achievement Award, she publicly acknowledged her female partner Eboni Nichols and son Rebel for the first time, ending the speech with "Happy Pride!"

In the January 2020 season 6, episode 4 of Finding Your Roots titled "This Land Is My Land", Latifah learned that her family were descended from a line of freed Negroes, since her ancestors were listed by name in the U.S. pre–Civil War census of 1860 in Virginia. Slaves were almost never listed by name in pre–U.S. Civil War censuses. Latifah also learned the exact date her ancestors became free which was October 1, 1792, the date her second earliest known ancestor, a woman named "Jug" or Juggy Owens, was emancipated from slavery.

She supported the Kamala Harris 2024 presidential campaign and spoke at a campaign rally in October 2024.

=== Feud with Foxy Brown ===
Disagreements between Foxy Brown and Queen Latifah began in mid-1996, where media reports indicated that Brown was a prime target of Latifah's diss record "Name Callin'", which was featured on the Set It Off soundtrack. In response, Brown made allegations of Latifah "checking her out" at musical events and further questioned Latifah's sexuality in various public radio interviews. In 1998, Brown released a diss record titled "10% Dis", where she continually questioned Latifah's sexuality and accused her of being jealous.

By late spring of 1998, Latifah responded to Brown through another diss record titled "Name Callin' Part II". On the record, Latifah disses Brown about her heavy reliance on sex appeal, in which she implies that Brown has to rely on skimpy outfits to hide her "half-assed flow". Foxy Brown retaliated via a response-diss record titled "Talk to Me", in which Brown made fun of the ratings of Latifah's television talk show and went on to make various homophobic remarks to both Latifah and then-newcomer Queen Pen.

A significant part of media dubbed Latifah "the winner" of the feud. Hip-hop magazine Ego Trip stated that Latifah won the feud with her diss record "Name Callin' Part II" and added that she showed that "the lady's still first", in reference to Latifah's 1990 single, "Ladies First". In 2000, Brown and Latifah reconciled; to prove that the truce was real, Brown performed her song "Na Na Be Like" on The Queen Latifah Show.

== Legacy ==
=== Music ===
Often cited as one of the best female rappers, Queen Latifah achieved groundbreaking success in the late 1980s and early 1990s, and became what Pitchfork considered as the "most recognizable female rapper" of the golden era of hip-hop. AllMusic writer Steve Huey stated that Latifah was "certainly not the first female rapper, but she was the first one to become a bona fide star." In the book Notable Black American Women, Jessie Carney Smith hailed her as "rap's first feminist" and "one of the few women to make a mark in the male-dominated field of rap music". Variety called her "one of the major forerunners for women in modern hip-hop," and The Guardian referred to her as a "pioneer of female rap".

Throughout her career, several media publications have referred to her as the "Queen of Rap" including New York magazine (1990) via editor Dinitia Smith, as well as "Queen of Hip Hop". Latifah became the first solo female rapper to receive a RIAA certification for an album (Black Reign), a commercial breakthrough that the AllMusic editor considered as creating a path for "a talented crew of women rappers to make their own way onto the charts as the 90s progressed". Her breakthrough also helped place New Jersey on the hip-hop map. In 1998, she performed in the Super Bowl XXXII halftime show, making her the first rapper to do so.

According to an African American Review journal, her afrocentric feminist music video for "Ladies First" presented a "televisual moment" and disrupted the continuity of sexism and racism that dominated the music videos at the time. The song was listed on the Rock and Roll Hall of Fame's 500 Songs That Shaped Rock and Roll, and was one of the first texts to address the declining standards of male-female relationships in community life. Author Tricia Rose expressed that it "offered hip-hop for the development of pro-female pro-black diasporas political consciousness." In Consequence, Okla Jones noted that the song "U.N.I.T.Y."—which lyrics confront slurs against women in hip-hop culture and address other types of disrespect—created a path for future female rappers to be "their authentic selves".

=== Acting ===
Vibe magazine has noted her as the first female rapper to cross over into TV & film, as an artist that "broke barriers and set standards" for Black women in music to follow, and cited her as the "First Lady of Hip-Hop". For her performance as Matron "Mama" Morton in Chicago, Latifah earned a nomination for the Academy Award for Best Supporting Actress, becoming the first woman in hip-hop to earn an Oscar nomination.

=== Cultural impact ===
Queen Latifah has been cited as an influence on R&B, soul, and hip-hop artists, such as Eve, Da Brat, Lil' Kim, Fugees, Jill Scott, Lauryn Hill, Missy Elliott, Remy Ma, Ivy Queen, Foxy Brown, Ms. Dynamite, Naughty by Nature, Rapsody, Megan Thee Stallion, Eminem, as well as actors Michael K. Williams, Keke Palmer, Vin Diesel, and author Jason Reynolds.

Playwright Lin-Manuel Miranda has stated that Latifah inspired the portrayal of Angelica Schuyler in the musical Hamilton. In 2020, Vogue editor Janelle Okwodu considered her a fashion icon that "helped to start a conversation about body image that continues to this day", crediting her among the first artists that pioneered the "climate of size inclusivity and muses of all shapes".

== Influence on the entertainment industry ==
=== Challenging Eurocentric standards ===
Queen Latifah has demonstrated several forms of activism over her lifetime, challenging Eurocentric ideals and representing the black, female body. An initial sign of the beginning of her resistance to these Eurocentric standards started with her name. Her entire name was self-chosen, and while 'Latifah' came from an Arabic book, 'Queen' originated from her desire to create a strong, black identity, which was fueled by her mother, Rita Owens, who gave her the foundation to develop into a self-proclaimed Queen.

Afrocentric Queendom is a concept that Queen Latifah uses to demonstrate her resistance to Eurocentric standards. This term, Afrocentric Queendom, refers to African centered customs that also incorporate female empowerment. Eurocentric constructions are challenged by this concept because Afrocentrism deconstructs oppressive environments, essentially disrupting centralized European spaces. The notion of the term Queen was intentionally crafted by Latifah, redefining what plus size, black women were in society. Over the twentieth century, the term 'mammy' coincided with black women because many were left to take care of white children. This term stripped many black women around this time of their name, forcing them to adopt the new identity of 'mammy'. Following the emergence of this term, African American women have been stereotyped as mothering figures, while also signaling a loss of identity. This is what Queen Latifah aimed to avoid when creating her stage name, with the intention of opposing the Eurocentric construction of the term mammy. The sole idea of her choosing her name imitates power and promotes strength within herself.

Latifah also rejects Eurocentric standards by embracing Afrocentric ideals and incorporating this concept within her work. She claims that Afrocentricity is a great way of living, creating a sense of pride around her heritage. Within her music, Latifah incorporates Afrobeats and language while also centering black women within her lyrics and visuals. This can be clearly identified in her 1989 'Ladies First' music video, to where South African culture is present in her work, which included Afrocentric visuals and clothes that align culturally with South Africa.

The idea of the black, female body has been criticized and mocked, as well as being imitated over the past couple of decades by celebrities. Latifah, a plus-sized, black woman, has continued to challenge Eurocentric standards by advocating for body positivity and incorporating her size as a part of her music identity within her early hip-hop career. Her goal was to politicize and posterize her body to influence young, black girls that all bodies should be accepted, especially in her male-dominated field at the time. Throughout her early career, Latifah challenged the Eurocentric mythology of the inferiority of black, female bodies, by creating a marketable figure that was respectable within the Hip Hop industry in the mid-1990s.

Queen Latifah did not always center Africanness around her career, eventually embracing more Black American customs, while not completely abandoning African ideals. This was present through her physical appearance and her music. In her 1993 rap song, U.N.I.T.Y. she incorporates more jazz and soul sounds into her music, as well as empowering lyrics. Her lyrics address concerns regarding harassment and domestic violence within the black community, as well as lyrics to uplift black women, and lyrics that address misogyny within the hip-hop community.

=== Early influence of feminism ===
While Afrocentric influence and pro-black productions were what Queen Latifah focused on, she also incorporated feminism throughout her work. Latifah's demonstration of Afrocentricity co-existed with how she also demonstrated her feminism. The message of hip-hop and rap began to change around the mid-nineties, with rappers like Queen Latifah, as well as Monie Love and Lil' Kim, changing the narrative. The lyrics of the songs produced by several of these women related to sexual liberation, female autonomy, and sexual domination. Language in hip-hop was changed through female artists, reclaiming derogatory words that are used against women and incorporating them within their music.

Queen Latifah's name, while self-empowering and challenging Eurocentric ideals, also demonstrates feminist action. The term "queen" refers to a female ruler who is in a higher position than those around her. By placing "Queen" in her stage name, Latifah set herself in a position to counter sexist ideals in the hip-hop and rap music industry, which was primarily dominated by men during this time.

While there were several women, like Latifah, who associated with feminism, there were several women who rejected the idea of incorporating this into their artistry due to negative connotations of this movement. Involvement with feminism could adversely affect their career, especially if the idea of feminism is rejected by people who dominate the music industry. Queen Latifah was not a follower in this situation, subtly incorporating third-wave feminism within her lyrics, which specifically addressed the inclusion of women of color in feminism and the elimination of homophobia.

=== Flavor Unit Records ===
Latifah also founded a production company, which was referred to as Flavor Unit Records, eventually Flavor Unit Entertainment, co-launching it in 1995 with her business partner Shakim Compere. Near the creation of this label, she helped several artists create their music, such as Daddy D. Daddy D was Latifah's first artist to create a single with. Her purpose was to create a multimedia company that operates at full service. Several music artists at the time wanted to join Queen Latifah's label because they easily identified her success, from an artist herself, to a self made label chief. The label remained quite small in the nineties, but eventually gained traction as Queen Latifah gained more attention. While her record label helped several artists start up their career, she remained at Motown Records for her own benefit.

=== Portrayal of characters ===
Queen Latifah expanded her career from music, branching out to acting, as well as producing. Her first role that she took on was in the movie Jungle Fever, which was released in 1991, where she performed among several significant black actors, such as Samuel L. Jackson and Halle Berry. Her role in this movie was not major, but displayed her overall talent enough in the film. She later moved to entertainment television, starring and co-producing certain episodes of the show Living Single.

==== Living Single ====
Queen Latifah was the star of the sitcom Living Single, which followed her character, Khadijah James, and three of her black, female friends. This sitcom that aired for three years aimed to highlight the Black American experience by demonstrating Black excellence. Latifah's character is described to embody what black womanhood was in the early nineties. Her character was well rounded and represented the idea of what a 'girl boss' was. With this all black cast, the possibilities for characters to be presented in a variety of ways were endless. Some characters, such as Maxine Shaw, played by Erika Alexander, were depicted as lawyers, while others were depicted as wealthy, such as Regine Hunter, played by Kim Fields. Khadijah was everything from a business owner, to a songwriter, to a friend, all while maintaining the lead role in the show. Depth and duality behind black characters on sitcoms within the nineties was not very common outside of Black Entertainment Television (BET), so it was quite significant to television when Latifah took on such an important role. With the help of Latifah, Yvette Lee Bowser, the executive producer and creator, actively changed the perception of Black Americans, painting a new light on the Black experience.

Through her performance through the show, Latifah showed the complexity of Black womanhood successfully. There were several parallels that were identified between Living Single and Queen Latifah's life, such as how both she and her character had to navigate a male-dominated industry while trying to be successful. Their personalities also align, both being outspoken, confident, and driven. Latifah realistically depicted a black woman on television by simply acting as herself on Living Single.

=== Early influence of sexuality in entertainment (before the 2000s) ===
Queen Latifah's sexuality has always come into question through her on-screen performances. In one of her films, 1996's Set It Off, she takes on a more masculine role. Cleopatra Sims (Cleo), Latifah's character, can be described as a butch, lesbian bank robber, which highlighted her sexuality. She was so successful while playing this masculine role, that rumors about her sexuality started spreading. In the early stages of her career, Latifah chose not to address the rumors regarding her sexuality, letting the public categorize her in their own way. Queen Latifah's ambiguity played to her strengths when acting, allowing her to have versatile roles and not become constrained to certain acting roles because of her off screen sexuality. This can be identified in many of her later films in her career, playing a range of either oversexualized characters or sexually muted characters. The distance Queen Latifah created from assumptions about her sexuality in her early career excluded her from any queer discourse throughout the 1990s. Her involvement in offhanded politics and pro-black work productions helped define her work, while her sexuality did not affect her work, early on.

== Accolades ==
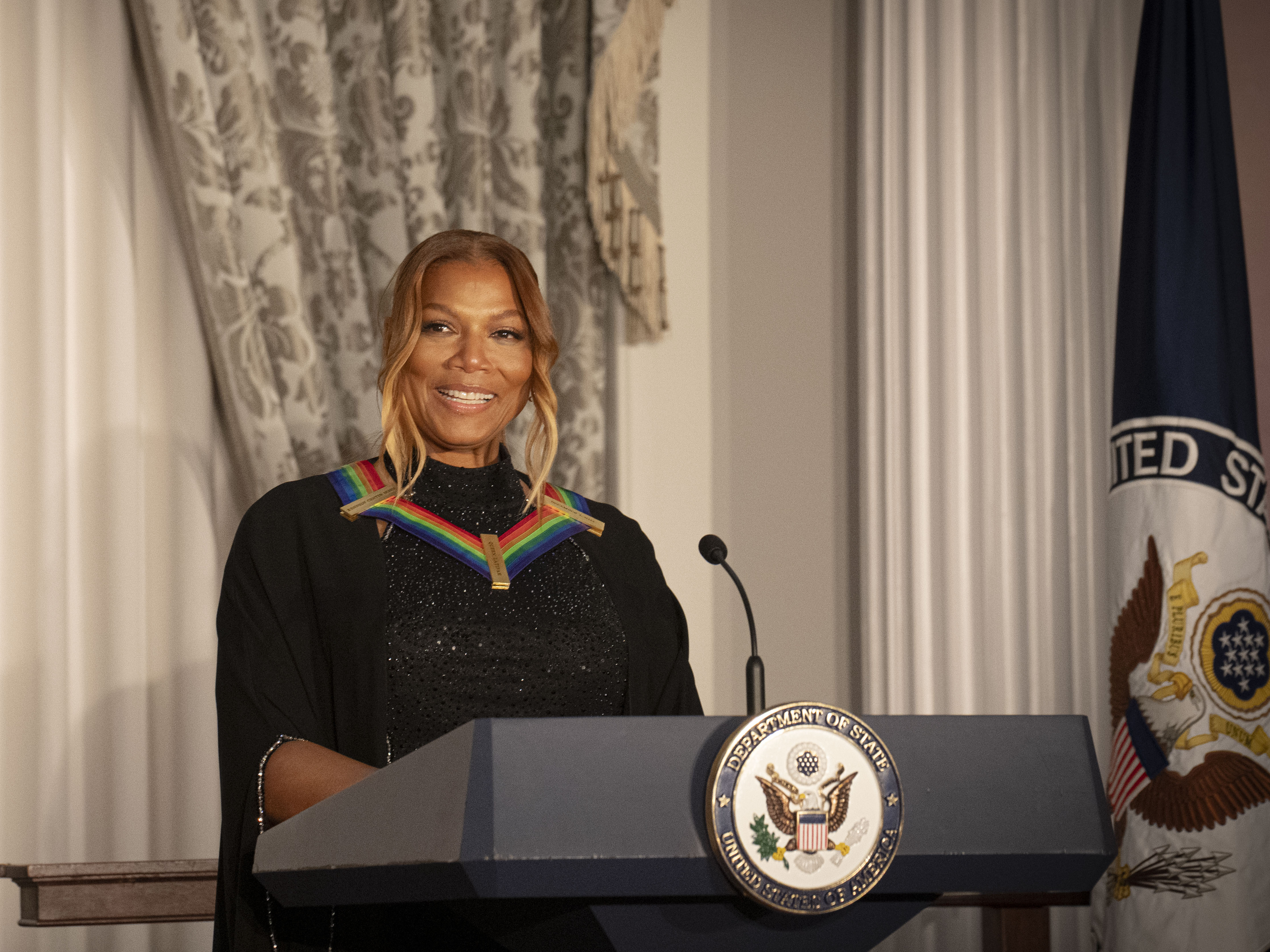
Latifah at the 2023 Kennedy Center Honors

Queen Latifah became the first female hip-hop recording artist to get nominated for an Oscar. In 2003, Queen Latifah was awarded Artist of the Year by the Harvard Foundation for Intercultural and Race Relations. In 2006, Latifah became the first hip-hop artist to receive a star on the Hollywood Walk of Fame, and was also inducted into the New Jersey Hall of Fame in 2011. In her music career, Queen Latifah has sold nearly 2 million albums in the US. The Root ranked her at number 35 on The Root 100 list. In 2017, American Black Film Festival honored Latifah with the Entertainment Icon award. In 2018, she received an honorary Doctor of Fine Arts Degree by the Rutgers University. In 2019, Harvard University awarded the W. E. B. Du Bois Medal to Queen Latifah for her contributions to black history and culture. In 2023, Queen Latifah's debut album All Hail the Queen, was added into the Library of Congress's National Recording Registry, making it the earliest female rap recording to enter the National Recording Registry, and making her the second female hip-hop recording artist to have her music included after Lauryn Hill.

She is the recipient of a Grammy Award (receiving six nominations), a Golden Globe Award, three Actor Awards (five nominations), two NAACP Image Awards (thirteen nominations), one Primetime Emmy Award (three nominations), and an Academy Award nomination. In 2021, she received the BET Lifetime Achievement Award, and was the first rapper, female or male, to be so awarded. In 2023, she became the first female rapper to be a Kennedy Center honoree.

Queen Latifah was inducted as an honorary member of Delta Sigma Theta sorority during the organization's 57th National Convention on July 9, 2025.

== Discography ==
Studio albums

- All Hail the Queen (1989)
- Nature of a Sista' (1991)
- Black Reign (1993)
- Order in the Court (1998)
- The Dana Owens Album (2004)
- Trav'lin' Light (2007)
- Persona (2009)

== Tours ==
Latifah, Jill Scott and Erykah Badu joined to create and own the rights to the Sugar Water Festival Tour, LLC. All three singers toured together while inviting music duo Floetry in 2005 and singer Kelis in 2006 as opening acts. Comedian/actress Mo'Nique served as host for the 2006 Sugar Water Tour.

- Sugar Water Festival (2005–06)
- Travlin' Light Tour (2007)

== Filmography ==
=== Film ===
Year	Title	Role	Notes
1991	Jungle Fever	Lashawn	
1991	House Party 2	Zora	
1992	Juice	Ruffhouse M.C.	
1993	Who's the Man?	Herself	
1993	My Life	Theresa	
1996	Set It Off	Cleopatra 'Cleo' Sims	
1997	Hoodlum	Sulie	
1998	Sphere	Alice "Teeny" Fletcher	
1998	Living Out Loud	Liz Bailey	
1999	The Bone Collector	Thelma	
1999	Bringing Out the Dead	Dispatcher Love (voice)	
2002	The Country Bears	Cha-Cha	
2002	Brown Sugar	Francine	
2002	Roberto Benigni's Pinocchio	Dove (English voice)	
2002	Chicago	Matron "Mama" Morton	
2003	Bringing Down the House	Charlene Morton	
2003	Scary Movie 3	Aunt Shaneequa	
2004	Barbershop 2: Back in Business	Gina Norris	
2004	The Cookout	Mildred Smith	
2004	Taxi	Isabelle "Belle" Williams	
2005	Beauty Shop	Gina Norris	
2006	Last Holiday	Georgia Byrd	
2006	Ice Age: The Meltdown	Ellie (voice)	
2006	Stranger than Fiction	Penny Escher	
2007	Hairspray	Motormouth Maybelle	
2007	The Perfect Holiday	Mrs. Christmas	
2008	Mad Money	Nina Brewster	
2008	What Happens in Vegas	Dr. Twitchell	
2008	The Secret Life of Bees	August Boatwright	
2009	Ice Age: Dawn of the Dinosaurs	Ellie (voice)	
2010	Valentine's Day	Paula Thomas	
2010	Just Wright	Leslie Wright	
2011	The Dilemma	Susan Warner	
2012	Joyful Noise	Vi Rose Hill	
2012	Ice Age: Continental Drift	Ellie (voice)	
2013	House of Bodies	Nicole	
2014	22 Jump Street	Mrs. Dickson	Uncredited
2016	Miracles from Heaven	Angela	
2016	Ice Age: Collision Course	Ellie (voice)	
2017	Girls Trip	Sasha Franklin	
2019	The Trap	Dr. Obayuwana	
2022	The Tiger Rising	Willie May	
2022	Hustle	Teresa Sugarman	
2022	End of the Road	Brenda Beaumont-Freeman	
2027	Ice Age: Boiling Point †	Ellie (voice)	In production
TBA	King of the South †	Josie Miller	Post-production

=== Television ===
Year	Title	Role	Notes
1989	House of Style	Herself	Episode: "Fall '89"
1990	The Media Show	Herself	Episode: "Black Primetime"
1990–2004	Showtime at the Apollo	Herself	Recurring guest
1991	The Fresh Prince of Bel-Air	Marissa Redman/Dee Dee	Episode: "Working It Out" & "She Ain't Heavy"
1993–98	Living Single	Khadijah James	Main cast
1994	Soul Train	Herself	Episode: "DRS/Queen Latifah/Souls of Mischief"
1994	ABC Afterschool Special	Herself	Episode: "I Hate the Way I Look"
1994	Bill Nye the Science Guy	Herself	Episode: "Insects"
1994	Hangin' with Mr. Cooper	Herself	Episode: "Wedding Bell Blues"
1994	Roc	Herself	Episode: "The Concert"
1995	22nd Annual American Music Awards	Herself/Co-Host	Television special
1995	The Critic	Herself (voice)	Episode: "Lady Hawke"
1995	The Twisted Tales of Felix the Cat	Various Roles (voice)	Episode: "Guardian Idiot/Space Time Twister/Don't String Me Along"
1996	Saturday Night Special	Herself	Episode 1.6
1996	Soul Train Lady of Soul Awards	Herself/Co-Host	Television special
1996	Intimate Portrait	Herself	Episode: "Queen Latifah"
1997	Mad TV	Herself/Host	Episode 2.13
1997	Ellen	Herself	Episode: "Ellen Unplugged"
1998	Mama Flora's Family	Diana	2 episodes
1999	14th Independent Spirit Awards	Herself/Host	Television special
1999–2001	The Queen Latifah Show	Herself/Host	Main host
2000	Who Wants to Be a Millionaire	Herself/Contestant	Episode: "Celebrity Millionaire 1, Show 1-2 & 4"
2000	The Greatest	Herself	Episode: "100 Greatest Rock & Roll Moments on TV"
2000–02	Hollywood Squares	Herself/Panelist	Recurring panelist
2001	Intimate Portrait	Herself	Episode: "Kim Fields"
2001	Spin City	Robin Jones	Episode: "Yeah Baby!" & "Sleeping with the Enemy"
2002	VH-1 Behind the Movie	Herself	Episode: "Chicago"
2002	Living with the Dead	Midge Harmon	TV movie
2003	Vibe Awards	Herself/Host	Television special
2003–08	Saturday Night Live	Herself	Recurring Guest
2004	Biography	Herself	Episode: "Richard Gere"
2004	Eve	Simone	Episode: "Sister, Sister"
2004	The Fairly OddParents	Pam Dromeda (voice)	Episode: "Crash Nebula"
2005	47th Annual Grammy Awards	Herself/Host	Television special
2005	The Muppets' Wizard of Oz	Aunt Em	TV movie
2006	Independent Lens	Herself	Episode: "Girl Trouble"
2006	Biography	Herself	Episode: "Steve Martin"
2006	Mad TV	Herself	Episode 11.17
2006	Getaway	Herself	Episode: "Golden Getaway: Hidden Treasures"
2006	America's Next Top Model	Herself	Episode: "The Girl Who Hates Her Hair"
2006	What It Takes	Herself	Episode: "Queen Latifah"
2007	Life Support	Ana Wallace	TV movie
2007–11	People's Choice Awards	Herself/Host	Television specials
2008	E! True Hollywood Story	Herself	Episode: "Renée Zellweger"
2008	Sweet Blackberry Presents	Herself/Narrator (voice)	Episode: "Garrett's Gift"
2009	Russell Simmons Presents Brave New Voices	Herself/Narrator	Main narrator
2009	Dancing with the Stars	Herself/Performer	Episode: "Round Three: Results Show"
2009	American Idol	Herself/Performer	Episode: "Finale"
2010	When I Was 17	Herself	Episode: "Episode 1.3"
2010	BET Awards	Herself/Host	Main host
2010	Entourage	Dana Elaine Owens	Episode: "Porn Scenes from an Italian Restaurant"
2010	30 Rock	Regina Bookman	Episode: "Let's Stay Together"
2011	Ice Age: A Mammoth Christmas	Ellie (voice)	TV movie
2011–12	Single Ladies	Sharon Love	Recurring cast (seasons 1–2)
2012	The Real Housewives of Miami	Herself	Episode: "Conflicting Conflict"
2012	Let's Stay Together	Bobbie	Episode: "Beauty and the Birthday"
2012	Steel Magnolias	M'Lynn	TV movie
2013–15	The Queen Latifah Show	Herself/Host	Main host
2014	18th Hollywood Film Awards	Herself/Host	Television special
2014	Jimmy Kimmel Live!	Sweet Brown	Episode: "Sweet Brown: Ain't Nobody Got Time for That"
2014	Hot in Cleveland	Aunt Esther Jean Johnson	Episode: "Strange Bedfellows"
2015	Bessie	Bessie Smith	TV movie
2015	The Wiz Live!	The Wiz	TV movie
2015	Lip Sync Battle	Herself/Competitor	Episode: "Queen Latifah vs. Marlon Wayans"
2016	In Performance at the White House	Herself	Episode: "A Celebration of American Creativity"
2016	Ice Age: The Great Egg-Scapade	Ellie (voice)	TV movie
2016–19	Star	Carlotta Brown	Main cast
2017	The Best Place to Be	Herself	Episode: "Queen Latifah - Brazil"
2017	Carpool Karaoke: The Series	Herself	Episode: "Queen Latifah & Jada Pinkett Smith"
2017	Empire	Carlotta Brown	Episode: "Noble Memory"
2017	Flint	Iza Banks	TV movie
2018	Martha & Snoop's Potluck Dinner Party	Herself	Episode: "Return of the Mac N Cheese"
2019	America's Got Talent	Herself/Guest Judge	Episode: "Semi Finals 2"
2019	Hip Hop: The Songs That Shook America	Herself	Episode: "Ladies First: 1989"
2019	The Little Mermaid Live!	Ursula	TV movie
2020	Finding Your Roots	Herself	Episode: "This Land is My Land"
2020	When the Streetlights Go On	Detective Grasso	Main cast
2020	Hollywood	Hattie McDaniel	Episodes: "A Hollywood Ending" & "Jump"
2021	Maya and the Three	Gran Bruja (voice)	Recurring cast
2021-25	The Equalizer	Robyn McCall	Main cast
2023	NAACP Image Awards	Herself/Host	Main host
2023	Ladies First: A Story of Women in Hip-Hop	Herself	Main guest

=== Music videos ===
Year	Song	Artist
1991	"O.P.P."	Naughty by Nature
1991	"2 Legit 2 Quit"	MC Hammer
1992	"Hip Hop Hooray"	Naughty by Nature
1995	"One More Chance"	The Notorious B.I.G.
1997	"Not Tonight"	Lil' Kim featuring Da Brat, Left Eye, Missy Elliott and Angie Martinez
2002	"Miss You"	Aaliyah

=== Producer ===
Year	Title	Role	Notes
2019	Scream: Resurrection	N/A	Executive producer

=== Video games ===
Year	Title	Role	Notes
2009	Ice Age: Dawn of the Dinosaurs	Ellie	
2012	Ice Age: Continental Drift - Arctic Games	Ellie	
2019	Sayonara Wild Hearts	Narrator	
