= The Queen Latifah Show =

American syndicated talk show (1999–2001; 2013–2015)

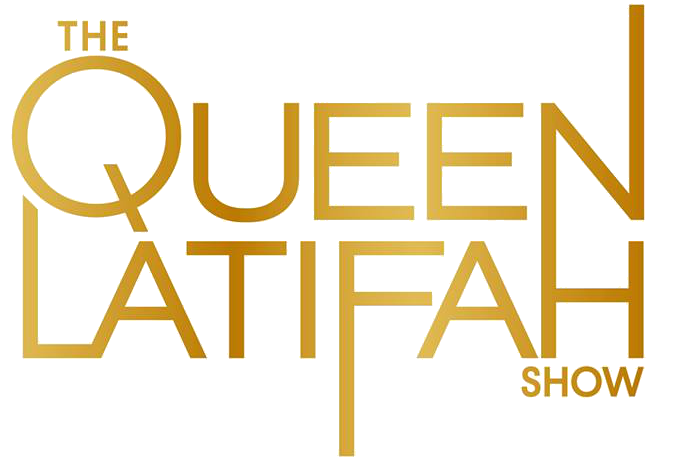
- Genre: Talk show
- Created by: Queen Latifah
- Presented by: Queen Latifah
- Country of origin: United States
- Original language: English
- No. of seasons: First incarnation: 2; Second incarnation: 2; Total: 4

Production
- Executive producers: Corin Nelson; Jada Pinkett Smith; James Lassiter; Miguel Melendez; Queen Latifah; Shakim Compere; Will Smith
- Running time: 42 minutes
- Production companies: Flavor Unit Entertainment; Overbrook Entertainment (2013–2015); Curly One Productions (2013–2014); Telepictures Productions (1999–2001); Sony Pictures Television (2013–2015)

Original release
- Network: Syndication
- Release: September 13, 1999 – August 31, 2001
- Release: September 16, 2013 – March 6, 2015

The Queen Latifah Show is an American television syndicated talk show hosted by Queen Latifah. The original The Queen Latifah Show ran from September 13, 1999, to August 31, 2001. The revamped The Queen Latifah Show ran from September 16, 2013, to March 6, 2015.

== The Queen Latifah Show (1999–2001) ==
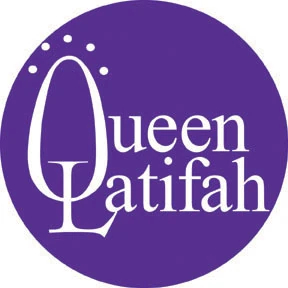
The show's logo from 1999 to 2001.

This syndicated series aired from September 13, 1999, to August 31, 2001. It was described as the "Dear Abby for the Hip-Hop Generation", with the series covering various topics and including interviews with celebrities and non-celebrities alike.

In 2000, Ed Glavin and Debbie Harwick Glavin, former producers of The Jenny Jones Show, were hired as executive producers for the show's second season.

== The Queen Latifah Show (2013–2015) ==
The revamped show premiered on September 16, 2013.

The Queen Latifah Show featured celebrity interviews, human interest stories, musical performances, and Queen Latifah's take on pop culture news. Latifah also ventured into communities across the country.

The Queen Latifah Show was taped in front of a live studio audience at Sony Pictures Studios in Culver City, California, and aired in broadcast syndication on CBS Television Stations. The series was produced by Flavor Unit Entertainment, Overbrook Entertainment, and Sony Pictures Television. The set for the series was designed by Lenny Kravitz's design firm, Kravitz Design.

This incarnation debuted with the second-best daytime talk launch since The Dr. Oz Show in 2009, premiering with a 1.7 rating/5 share primary-run household average in the weighted metered markets. Latifah's premiere was also up 31% from its year-ago time periods and up 21% from its average lead-in. In daytime's key demographic of women 25–54, the series surged 80% from last year and 29% from its lead-ins to a 0.9/5.

On January 6, 2014, The Queen Latifah Show was renewed for a second and final season. However, on November 21, 2014, Sony Pictures Television canceled Queen Latifah's show due to declining ratings. Production of the series ended, taking effect on December 18, 2014, leaving new episodes that were broadcast until March 6, 2015. Reruns that continued airing until the end of the television season.

== Awards and nominations ==
At the 40th People's Choice Awards in 2014, Queen Latifah won the Favorite New Talk Show Host award.

Year	Award	Recipient	Result	Ref
2014	NAACP Image Award for Outstanding Talk Series	The Queen Latifah Show	Nominated	
2015	NAACP Image Award for Outstanding Talk Series	The Queen Latifah Show	Nominated	
