= Nature of a Sista' =

Studio album by Queen Latifah
- Released: September 3, 1991
- Recorded: 1990–1991
- Studio: Various (See background and recording section)
- Genre: Hip-hop
- Length: 49:08
- Label: Tommy Boy
- Producers: Queen Latifah (executive); Shakim Compere (executive)

Queen Latifah chronology
All Hail the Queen (1989)	Nature of a Sista' (1991)	Black Reign (1993)

Singles from Nature of a Sista'
- 1. "Fly Girl" Released: 1991; 2. "Latifah's Had It Up 2 Here" Released: November 28, 1991; 3. "How Do I Love Thee" Released: March 17, 1992

Nature of a Sista' is the second studio album by American rapper Queen Latifah. Released on September 3, 1991, it served as a follow-up to her 1989 debut album All Hail the Queen and was her final album with Tommy Boy Records. Latifah was an executive producer for Nature of a Sista' alongside American producer Shakim Compere. Although predominantly a hip-hop album, it includes elements of reggae, jazz, R&B, new jack swing, and house music. The lyrics of the album's songs revolve around gender politics and romance. While discussing the album's overall style, Latifah said she moved away from hardcore hip-hop to experiment with other music genres and have more creative control over her work.

Reviews of the album were mixed; some music critics praised Latifah's verses and the album's variety of musical styles, while others felt it was a poor follow-up to All Hail the Queen. It peaked at number 117 on the Billboard 200 chart and sold over 500,000 copies worldwide. Three singles – "Fly Girl", "How Do I Love Thee", and "Latifah's Had It Up 2 Here" – were released and promoted through accompanying music videos; all of the songs made appearances on Billboard charts. Following the release of the album, Latifah was dropped from Tommy Boy Records due to low sales.

== Background and recording ==
Due to the success of Queen Latifah's debut studio album All Hail the Queen (1989), which sold approximately 450,000 copies, Peter Watrous of The New York Times said he believed Latifah had become a representative for young black woman and a media "hungry for someone articulate, political and savvy about feminism but not confrontational". Marisa Fox of Entertainment Weekly said Latifah was becoming an established figure in rap and club music from the commercial performance of All Hail the Queen. Because of Latifah's heightened profile, Nature of a Sista' was considered among the most anticipated hip-hop releases of the year.

Nature of a Sista' was completed between 1990 and 1991; it was recorded in various studios in New York City—D&D Studios, Hit Factory, Power Play Studios, Quadraphinc Studios, Quadraphonic Studios, and Unique Recording. The album was also recorded at Soundcastle Studios in Los Angeles, Calliope Productions in Boston, and Teentwon Studios in Copenhagen. Latifah and American producer Shakim Compere served as the executive producers. The album's liner notes include the text: "The kingdom is possible because of the queen ... the king is the sign. While the queen is the symbol."

== Composition and sound ==
"It's true that there isn't as much hardcore rap on this album as I've done in the past, but it was more like a freedom of expression-type thing. This new one has a woman's touch to it, I suppose, my little trademarks; so it's more my album than the producer's."

— Queen Latifah discussing her approach to the overall sound for Nature of a Sista'.

Nature of a Sista' is a hip-hop album that consists of twelve tracks; the instrumentals, provided by live musicians, combine elements of reggae and jazz along with "a raucous African beat" and "melodic choruses". A writer from The Boombox described the album as incorporating R&B and house music, and Spin's Dimitri Ehrlich said it features a new jack swing sound through its sharper focus on vocal harmonies and electronic drums.

A writer from People magazine noted that Nature of a Sista' focuses on issues relating to "self-assurance, humor and intelligence"; Latifah encourages women to respect themselves rather than place value in sex or money. Some songs, such as "That's the Way We Flow" focus on gender politics, while others detail issues relating to love, such as "Give Me Your Love" and "How Do I Love Thee". The former is an R&B track that revolves around the effects of racism on a romantic relationship. Latifah does not use obscene language on the album. She chose to sing more on this album as a way of pursuing her personal interests, and that it was not because of potential financial gains. She said: "It was about making a record I like. I have to make what feels right to me." Comparing Nature of a Sista' with Latifah's previous studio albums, Marisa Fox wrote: "She’s toned down the sass and become more sensual and sophisticated. Here’s one woman who rejects sexism, but not sex."

=== Songs ===
Fox described the opening track, ”Latifah’s Had It Up to Here”, as Latifah's way of "still keep[ing] the brothers in check"; lyrics include: "But I'm wise, civilized / Growing higher / Judgment's from the queen / Punish is the fire / I’m here to make these fools out of liars / You must learn, step and respect the sire / Face the fire”. On the second song "Nuff of the Ruff Stuff", Latifah raps about gender politics using the lines: "As a black woman me want equality / Equality and the freedom to be me". "Fly Girl" focuses on men's attempts to court her; Latifah answers their pick-up line: “You must be mad! / Easy lover, something that I ain’t / Besides, I don’t know you from a can of paint”. The downtempo song includes male vocal harmonies as part of the chorus and elements of new jack swing.

The album's title track revolves around Latifah bragging about her skills as a rapper, while "Sexy Fancy" contains influences from dancehall music and ragga. The song "If You Don't Know" contains a sample of James Brown's 1974 single "The Payback". In the album's closing track "How Do I Love Thee", Latifah instructs her lover how to sexually pleasure her; lyrics include: “It pleases me to have you touch me there / I think you know it gets to me / Stop! Don’t stop! Ecstasy!”; a writer for Rolling Stone said the song is reminiscent of Madonna's 1990 single "Justify My Love". Latifah wrote "How Do I Love Thee" during the filming of the 1990 movie House Party 2, and said: "I was away from home and I was . . . you know, kind of horny".

== Release and promotion ==
"Fly Girl"
"Fly Girl" contains influences from new jack swing, a genre which critics noted was a recurring element on the album.

"Fly Girl" was released as the album's lead single; it was promoted through a music video, in which Latifah wears an African headdress while accompanied by a group of back-up dancers. The song and its instrumental were released on a vinyl record along with the album's title track and its instrumental. "Fly Girl" peaked at number 16 on the Hot R&B/Hip-Hop Songs Billboard chart on November 9, 1991, and remained on the chart for 14 weeks. It also reached number 19 on the Hot Rap Songs Billboard chart on October 26, 1991, and stayed on the chart for nine weeks.

Nature of a Sista' was first released on September 3, 1991, on cassette, CD, and LP record formats through Tommy Boy Records; it was re-released in 2004 through Rhino Entertainment as a digital download. Latifah held an album release party at an Indian restaurant in New York City. When discussing her vision for the album, Latifah said: "I really want Nature of a Sista' to go platinum, I want to sell a million records. A lot more doors open up if I get that status. Not to mention the money."

As of April 11, 2017, the album sold over 273,000 copies in the United States and over 500,000 copies worldwide. It peaked at number 117 on the Billboard 200 chart on October 5, 1991, and remained on the chart for 23 weeks. The album also reached number 32 on the Top R&B/Hip-Hop Albums Billboard chart on February 22, 1992, and remained on the chart for 32 weeks.

"How Do I Love Thee" and "Latifah's Had It Up 2 Here" were released as the second and third singles, respectively. They were promoted through accompanying music videos. "How Do I Love Thee" peaked at number 13 on the Hot R&B/Hip-Hop Songs Billboard chart on February 22, 1992, and remained on the chart for 16 weeks. "Latifah's Had It Up 2 Here" also reached number eight on the Hot Rap Songs Billboard chart on February 8, 1992, and stayed on the chart for 11 weeks. Latifah performed the album track "If You Don't Know" on the American sketch comedy television series In Living Color.

== Critical reception ==
Professional ratings
Review scores
Source	Rating
AllMusic	2.5/5 stars
The Encyclopedia of Popular Music	4/5 stars
Entertainment Weekly	A
NME	9/10
Q	3/5 stars
Rolling Stone	3/5 stars

Upon its release, the album was generally well received. Marisa Fox praised Latifah's verses and described its songs as "show[ing] her softer, more feminine side". A writer for Vibe positively responded to the album for pushing the boundaries of musical genres, singling out "Latifah's Had It Up 2 Here" and "How Do I Love Thee" as examples. Alex Henderson of AllMusic described the album as "a decent sophomore effort that has more strengths than weaknesses", and commended Latifah for projecting a positive image.

Nature of a Sista' was also the subject of praise in several retrospective reviews. In a 2005 article, a reviewer from Rolling Stone also praised Latifah's experimentation with different types of music, saying that it "sampl[es] a wider range of the Queen's prodigious talents and musical styles than did her first album". In 2018, The Source's Ime Ekpo wrote that Nature of a Sista' was a sign of how Latifah had "evolved into a more sensual artist", and The Boombox's Jacinta Howard felt that it showcased her versatility. Howard cited "Latifah's Had It Up 2 Here" as "one of the most hard-hitting entries in [Latifah's] catalog".

Some critics had a more negative response for the album. While Henderson praised Latifah's technique as a rapper, he wrote that too much of the album was devoted to her "boasting about her microphone skills", and said it did not reflect her full capability as an artist. A writer from Rolling Stone said Nature of a Sista' was a disappointing follow-up to All Hail the Queen, primarily citing the lack of growth in Latifah's rapping style and the album's lack of focus. Despite identifying "If You Don't Know" as a highlight, Ms. Krista panned Nature of a Sista' as forgettable; she criticized "Fly Girl" and "Sexy Fancy" as unsuccessful attempts to incorporate influences from other genres, and described the album's title track as too focused on Latifah gloating about her rapping abilities.

== Aftermath ==
Latifah was removed from Tommy Boy Records due to the album's low sales. Ms. Krista of SoulBounce.com attributed the poor commercial performance to the absence of American producer DJ Mark the 45 King, who had previously worked with Latifah on All Hail the Queen. A writer for Vibe believed Nature of a Sista' would have sold better if it had been promoted as an R&B release. According to Latifah, the album's commercial performance was representative of how female rappers get fewer resources than men; she said: "People wonder why girls don't go platinum, but a lot of the time we don't get the same money [for marketing and promotion], and that's just a straight-up fact".

According to a writer from The Boombox, music critics had started to ask whether Latifah was more focused on developing crossover appeal rather than creating rap music, partially because of the release of Nature of a Sista'. Music critics interpreted her 1993 follow-up album Black Reign as a way "to deliver something that cemented her credibility as an artist".

== Track listing ==
No.	Title	Writer(s)	Producer(s)	Length
1.	"Latifah's Had It Up 2 Here"	Vincent Brown; Anthony Criss; Keir Gist; Dana Owens	Naughty By Nature	4:26
2.	"Nuff of the Ruff' Stuff'"	Dana Owens; Luis Vega	Luis Vega	3:50
3.	"One Mo' Time"	Vincent Brown; Anthony Criss; Keir Gist; Dana Owens	Naughty By Nature	4:51
4.	"Give Me Your Love"	Cutfather; Curtis Mayfield; Dana Owens; Soulshock	Soulpower Productions	3:50
5.	"Love Again"	Cutfather; Dana Owens; Soulshock	Soulpower Productions	3:41
6.	"Bad as a Mutha"	Mich Hansen; Curtis Mayfield; Dana Owens; Carsten Schack; Soulshock	Soulpower Productions	4:01
7.	"Fly Girl"	Mich Hansen; Dana Owens; Carsten Schack	Soulpower Productions	4:02
8.	"Sexy Fancy"	Kevin McKenzie; Dana Owens	K-Cut	3:56
9.	"Nature of a Sista'"	Dana Owens; Luis Vega	Luis Vega	3:19
10.	"That's the Way We Flow" (featuring Safari Sister Swatch)	M. Holmes; Kevin McKenzie; Ziggy Modeliste; Art Neville; Leo Nocentelli; Dana Owens	K-Cut	3:22
11.	"If You Don't Know"	Nevelle Hodge; Dana Owens	Nevelle Hodge	4:58
12.	"How Do I Love Thee"	Tania Maria; Dana Owens	Queen Latifah	5:01
Total length:				49:08

Notes

- * "If You Don't Know" samples the guitar riff from James Brown's 1974 "The Payback".

== Credits and personnel ==
The following credits were adapted from the booklet of Nature Of A Sista' and AllMusic:

- The 45 King – concept
- David Bellochio – keyboards
- Tom Coyne – mastering
- Cutfather – mixing, producer
- DJ Kay Gee – mixing
- Doctor Illington – keyboards
- Dr. Shane Faber – engineer, keyboards, mixing
- Bob Fisher – mastering
- Nevelle Hodge – mixing, producer
- K-Cut – producer
- Pascal Lewis – hair stylist, make-up
- Naughty by Nature – mixing, producer
- Robin Newland – clothing/wardrobe
- Frank Ockenfels – photography
- Anton Pukshansky – engineer
- Queen Latifah – executive producer, mixing, primary artist, producer, vocals
- Scringer Ranks – guest artist
- Safari Sister Swatch – featured artist, primary artist, vocals (background)
- Scringer Ranks – vocals
- Shakim Compere – executive producer
- Paul Shapiro – saxophone
- Simple Pleasure – vocals (background)
- Soulshock – mixing, producer
- "Little" Louie Vega – mixing, producer

== Charts ==
Weekly chart performance for Nature of a Sista'
Chart (1991–1992)	Peak position
US Billboard 200	117
US Top R&B/Hip-Hop Albums (Billboard)	32

== Release history ==
Release dates for Nature of a Sista'
Country	Date	Format(s)	Label
Various	September 3, 1991	CD	Tommy Boy
Various	September 3, 1991	Cassette	Tommy Boy
Various	September 3, 1991	LP record	Tommy Boy
Various	2004	Digital download	Rhino
