= Trav'lin' Light (Queen Latifah album) =

Studio album by Queen Latifah
- Released: September 25, 2007
- Genre: Vocal jazz; R&B
- Length: 51:29
- Label: Verve; Universal
- Producer: Ron Fair; Tommy LiPuma; Marc Shaiman

Queen Latifah chronology
The Dana Owens Album (2004)	Trav'lin' Light (2007)	Persona (2009)

Trav'lin' Light is the sixth studio album by American actress and hip-hop artist Queen Latifah. It was released through Verve Records on September 25, 2007.

== Background ==
Following The Dana Owens Album released in 2004, this is Latifah's second singing album containing cover versions of jazz standards. The album spent three weeks atop the Billboard Jazz Albums chart.

The album cut "I'm Gonna Live Till I Die" won the 2008 Grammy Award for Best Instrumental Arrangement Accompanying Vocalist(s), which was presented to its arranger, John Clayton. Trav'lin' Light was also nominated for Best Traditional Pop Vocal Album.

The album's first song and subsequently first single, "Poetry Man" is a cover of Phoebe Snow's song of the same name.

== Critical reception ==
Professional ratings
Review scores
Source	Rating
AllMusic	4/5 stars
Entertainment Weekly	C+

William Ruhlman of AllMusic claimed "Trav'lin' Light is, if anything, even better than that Grammy-nominated set, The Dana Owens Album. In song after song, she has come up with a character to portray through the lyrics, and that helps make her interpretations convincing. Sometimes, it is the songwriters themselves she seems to be channeling...however, it is the singer herself who deserves the credit for making the album work. As with her acting, Queen Latifah's singing is most laudable for not trying to do too much; she may evoke James or Nina Simone or Holiday (or Smokey Robinson or the Pointer Sisters), but she never tries to outsing them; rather, her versions are glosses on the greats she and her producers so admire." Entertainment Weekly's Chris Willman review was less favorable, stating "between 2004's The Dana Owens Album and her run as a movie-musical diva, the 'Hey, that rapper lady can sing!' novelty has worn off. We now wonder if Latifah can succeed Diana Krall—or Rod Stewart!—as our leading pop-standards standard-bearer. Taste prevails, but personality must be left to the hundred more interesting jazz singers out there." Thomas Conrad of JazzTimes proclaimed that "the title is a bit ironic. For this 13-track collection, a follow-up to Latifah’s 2004 The Dana Owens Album, she’s carrying a lot of baggage. There’s also the weight of history. Can a politicized rapper turned Oscar-nominated actress be taken seriously when she makes a mid-career segue into soul-infused jazz singing? Truth is, as velvet-smooth journeys into the pop-jazz canon go, Trav'lin' Light is an estimable exercise in showmanship, shaped by a well-seasoned pro who, though perhaps lacking the daring of a Cassandra Wilson or Diana Krall, is deserving of respectful attention. Sure, her cover of 10cc's 'I'm Not in Love' is a little too Diana Ross, and, yes, her reading of Smokey Robinson's 'What Love Has Joined Together' ventures nary an inch from its carefully choreographed Motown roots. But those are the exceptions here, not the rule." Billboard's Chuck Taylor called it "a marvelous sonic achievement, recorded with such satiny care and class that it seems a crime that anyone might belittle the listening experience with an MP3 player or computer."

== Track listing ==
Standard edition
No.	Title	Writer(s)	Length
1.	"Poetry Man"	Phoebe Snow	4:39
2.	"Georgia Rose" (featuring Stevie Wonder)	Jimmy Flynn; Harry Rosenthal; Alex Sullivan	3:43
3.	"Quiet Nights of Quiet Stars"	Antonio Carlos Jobim; Gene Lees	3:54
4.	"Don't Cry Baby"	Saul Bernice; James P. Johnson; Stella Unger	2:53
5.	"I Love Being Here with You"	Peggy Lee; William Schluger	2:52
6.	"I'm Gonna Live Till I Die"	Mann Curtis; Al Hoffman; Walter Kent	2:09
7.	"Trav'lin' Light"	Johnny Mercer; Jimmy Mundy; Trummy Young	4:04
8.	"I Want a Little Sugar in My Bowl"	Nina Simone	3:05
9.	"I'm Not in Love"	Eric Stewart; Graham Gouldman	4:47
10.	"What Love Has Joined Together"	Smokey Robinson; Bobby Rogers	3:40
11.	"How Long (Betcha Got a Chick on the Side)"	Anita Pointer; June Pointer; Patricia Pointer; Ruth Pointer; David Robinson	5:41
12.	"Gone Away"	Donny Hathaway; Leroy Hutson; Curtis Mayfield	5:49
13.	"I Know Where I've Been" (from Hairspray)	Marc Shaiman; Scott Wittman	4:13
Total length:			51:29

Queen Latifah online store bonus track
No.	Title	Writer(s)	Length
14.	"Java Jive"	Ben Oakland; Milton Drake	3:46

Walmart bonus track
No.	Title	Writer(s)	Length
14.	"Every Woman Is a Queen"	Queen Latifah	1:51

Notes

- "Every Woman Is a Queen" is featured in Latifah's CoverGirl commercials.

== Credits ==
Adapted from AllMusic.

- Alex Al — bass
- Sachico Asano — graphic design
- Julie Baker — hair stylist
- Rick Baptist — trumpet
- Wayne Bergeron — flugelhorn, trumpet
- Gary Bias — flute, saxophone
- Charlie Bisharat — violin
- George Bohanon — trombone
- Jacqueline Brand — violin
- Becky Bunnell — violin
- Lee Callet — clarinet, saxophone
- Mark Cargill — violin
- Anthony Caruso — assistant engineer, digital editing
- Gilbert Castellanos — trumpet
- Oscar Castro-Neves — guitar
- Ronald Clark — violin
- Jeff Clayton — saxophone
- John Clayton — arranger, conductor
- Shakim Compere — executive producer
- Luis Conte — percussion
- Larry Corbett — cello
- Jim Cox — keyboards
- Manny Curtis — composer
- Jill Dell'Abate — production coordination
- Brian Dembow — viola
- Yvette Devereaux — violin
- Andrew Duckles — viola
- George Duke — fender rhodes, piano
- Bruce Dukov — violin
- Mike Eleopoulos — engineer, mixing
- Stephen Erdody — cello
- Chris Ermacoff — cello
- Ron Fair — producer
- Keith Fiddmont — saxophone
- Roxanna Floy — make-up
- James Ford III — trumpet
- Matthew Funes — viola
- Steve Genewick — digital editing, engineer
- Julie Gigante — violin
- Graham Gouldman — composer
- John Goux — guitar
- Gary Grant — flugelhorn, trumpet
- Bernie Grundman — mastering
- Alan Grunfeld — violin
- Larry Hall — flugelhorn, trumpet
- Jeff Hamilton — drums
- Lisa Hansen — release coordinator
- Niki Haris — background vocals
- Donny Hathaway — composer
- Nate Hertweck — mixing assistant
- Tal Herzberg — digital editing, engineer
- Jerry Hey — arranger, conductor
- Dan Higgins — flute, saxophone
- Buffy Hubelbank — production coordination
- Bill Hughes — orchestra manager
- Leroy Hutson — composer
- Alex Iles — trombone
- Paul Jackson Jr. — guitar
- Antônio Carlos Jobim — composer
- Suzie Katayama — cello
- Ryan Kennedy — mixing assistant
- Peter Kent — violin
- Walter Kent — composer
- Hollis King — art direction
- Ron King — trumpet
- Abe Laboriel Jr. — drums
- Abraham Laboriel Sr. — bass
- Michael Landau — guitar
- Songa Lee — violin
- Gene Lees — composer
- Natalie Leggett — violin
- Mario de León — violin
- Gayle Levant — harp
- Phillip Levy — violin
- Tommy LiPuma — producer
- Monica Lynch — A&R, executive producer
- Shawn Mann — viola
- Andrew Martin — trombone
- Greg Mathieson — keyboards, organ
- Christian McBride — bass
- Darrin McCann — viola
- Joe McEwen — A&R
- Johnny Mercer — composer
- Jonathan Merritt — assistant engineer
- Victoria Miskolczy — viola
- Cameron Mizell — release coordinator
- Peter Mokran — mixing
- Evelyn Morgan — A&R
- Susan Moses — stylist, wardrobe
- Jimmy Mundy — composer
- John Newcott — release coordinator
- Robin Olson — violin
- Charlie Owens — saxophone
- Sid Page — violin
- Sara Parkins — violin
- Alan Pasqua — keyboards
- Joel Peskin — flute, saxophone
- Valerie Pinkston — background vocals
- Anita Pointer — composer
- June Pointer — composer
- Patricia Pointer — composer
- Ruth Pointer — composer
- Katia Popov — violin
- Jack Joseph Puig — mixing
- Queen Latifah — lead vocals
- Bill Reichenbach Jr. — trombone, tuba
- Antonio Resendiz — assistant engineer
- Kevin Ricard — percussion
- Ramon Rivas — assistant engineer
- Smokey Robinson — composer
- Robert Rogers — composer
- Anatoly Rosinsky — violin
- Jim Ross — viola
- David Rubinson — composer
- Joe Sample — piano
- Doug Sax — mastering
- Bill Schluger — composer
- Al Schmitt — engineer, mixing
- Stéphane Sednaoui — photography
- Marc Shaiman — composer, producer
- Allen Sides — engineer
- Nina Simone — composer
- Bill Airey Smith — engineer
- Dan Tobin Smith — cello
- Maurice Spears — trombone
- Eric Stewart — composer
- Shari Sutcliffe — music contractor, project coordinator
- Toots Thielemans — harmonica
- Michael Thompson — photography
- Sarah Thornblade — violin
- Cecilia Tsan — cello
- Stella Unger — composer
- Lamont Van Hook — background vocals
- Josefina Vergara — violin
- Tommy Vicari — mixing
- Irina Voloshina — violin
- Eric Weaver — mixing assistant
- Fred White — background vocals
- Anthony Wilson — guitar
- Evan Wilson — viola
- Scott Wittman — composer
- Stevie Wonder — harmonica, lead vocals
- Reggie C. Young — trombone
- Trummy Young — composer

== Weekly charts ==
Chart (2007)	Peak position
US Billboard 200	11
US Top R&B/Hip-Hop Albums (Billboard)	6
US Top Jazz Albums (Billboard)	1

== Release history ==
Country	Date	Label
United States	September 25, 2007	Verve
Canada	September 25, 2007	Verve
Australia	September 29, 2007	Verve
Germany	October 19, 2007	Universal
Japan	October 30, 2007	Universal
United Kingdom	November 5, 2007	Verve
