= All Hail the Queen =

Studio album by Queen Latifah
- Released: November 7, 1989
- Genre: Hip-hop
- Length: 49:14
- Label: Tommy Boy
- Producers: DJ Mark the 45 King, Louis 'Louie Louie' Vega, KRS-One, Daddy-O, Prince Paul

Queen Latifah chronology
All Hail the Queen (1989)	Nature of a Sista' (1991)

Singles from All Hail the Queen
- 1. "Wrath of My Madness" Released: 1988; 2. "Dance for Me" Released: 1989; 3. "Ladies First" Released: 1989; 4. "Come Into My House" Released: 1990; 5. "Mama Gave Birth to the Soul Children" Released: 1990

All Hail the Queen is the debut studio album by American rapper Queen Latifah. The album was released on November 7, 1989, through Tommy Boy Records. The feminist anthem "Ladies First", featuring Monie Love, remains one of Latifah's signature songs.

All Hail the Queen peaked at No. 6 on the Billboard Top Hip Hop/R&B Albums chart and at No. 124 on the Billboard 200 chart. "Wrath of My Madness" was the first single from All Hail the Queen, and was later sampled in Yo-Yo's "You Can't Play with My Yo-Yo". "Mama Gave Birth to the Soul Children" peaked at No. 14 in the UK.

In 2023, the album was selected for preservation in the United States National Recording Registry by the Library of Congress as being "culturally, historically, or aesthetically significant".

== Critical reception ==
Professional ratings
Review scores
Source	Rating
AllMusic	3.5/5 stars
Chicago Tribune	3/4 stars
Los Angeles Times	3/5 stars
NME	7/10
Q	4/5 stars
Record Mirror	4/5
The Rolling Stone Album Guide	4/5 stars
Spin Alternative Record Guide	8/10
Tampa Bay Times	4/5 stars
The Village Voice	A−

The New York Times noted that "the backup tracks are sometimes rich enough to carry the album on their own, but they don't have to; some songs have vocal choruses, while in others Queen Latifah's rising and falling speech provides melody enough." Newsday called the album "international ghetto music filtered through hip-hop's strongest feminist sensibility."

In 1998, All Hail the Queen was included in The Source's "100 Best Albums" list. It was later featured in Robert Dimery's 1001 Albums You Must Hear Before You Die. In 2008, the single "Ladies First" was ranked number 35 on VH1's 100 Greatest Songs of Hip Hop.

== Legacy ==
In 2023, All Hail the Queen was inducted into the Library of Congress's National Recording Registry, based on its "cultural, historical or aesthetic importance in the nation’s recorded sound heritage." In their statement explaining their inclusion of the album, the Library of Congress said, "[Queen Latifah's] album showed rap could cross genres including reggae, hip-hop, house, and jazz – while also opening opportunities for other female rappers."

== Track listing ==
No.	Title	Writer(s)	Length
1.	"Dance for Me"	Dana Owens; Sylvester Stewart; Mark James Howard	3:41
2.	"Mama Gave Birth to the Soul Children" (with De La Soul)	Dana Owens; Vincent Mason; Kelvin Mercer; David Jolicoeur	4:25
3.	"Come into My House" (with Quasar)	Dana Owens; Mark Howard James	4:14
4.	"Latifah's Law"	Dana Owens; Luis Ferdinand Vega Jr.	3:51
5.	"Wrath of My Madness"	Dana Owens; Mark Howard James	4:12
6.	"The Pros" (with Daddy-O)	Dana Owens; Glenn K. Bolton	5:43
7.	"Ladies First" (with Monie Love)	Dana Owens; Anthony Peaks; Simone Johnson; Shawn Faber; Mark Howard James	3:45
8.	"A King and Queen Creation" (with 45 King)	Dana Owens; Mark Howard James; Curtis Addison; Anthony Peaks	3:34
9.	"Queen of Royal Badness"	Mark Howard James; Lakeim Sharik Welch	3:24
10.	"Evil That Men Do" (with KRS-One)	Dana Owens; Lawrence Parker	4:03
11.	"Princess of the Posse"	Dana Owens; Mark Howard James	3:51
12.	"Inside Out"	Dana Owens; Sylvester Stewart; Mark James Howard	4:11

CD bonus tracks
No.	Title	Writer(s)	Length
13.	"Dance for Me" (Ultimatum Remix)	Dana Owens; Sylvester Stewart; Mark James Howard	5:04
14.	"Wrath of My Madness" (Soulshock Remix)	Dana Owens; Mark Howard James	5:30
15.	"Princess of the Posse" (DJ Mark the 45 King Remix)	Dana Owens; Mark Howard James	4:07

== Personnel ==
- Daddy O – Producer, Performer, Mixing
- De La Soul – Performer
- Dr. Jam – Remixing
- KRS-One – Producer, Mixing
- Queen Latifah – Producer, Mixing
- Monie Love – Performer
- DJ Mark the 45 King – Producer, Performer, Mixing
- Paul C. – Engineer, Mixing
- Prince Paul – Producer, Mixing
- Soulshock – Remixing
- Dwayne Sumal – Engineer
- Rob Sutton – Mixing
- Ted Jensen – Mastering
- Mike Teelucksingh – Engineer
- Little Louie Vega – Producer, Mixing
- Dr. Shane Faber – Bass, Engineer
- Dan Miller – Engineer, Mixing
- Bob Coulter – Engineer, Mixing
- Al Watts – Engineer, Mixing
- Steven Miglio – Artwork, Design, Layout Design
- Dante Ross – Production Coordination, Production Consultant
- Ultimatum – Remixing
- Dilly d'Mus – Assistant Engineer
- Louis Vego – Producer, Mixing
- Howard Zucker – Typography
- Jane Wexler – Photography
- Bart Everly – Photography
- Christopher Shaw – Engineer
- Gawthaman Gobinath – Make-up Artist

== Charts ==
=== Weekly charts ===
Weekly chart performance for All Hail the Queen
Chart (1989–1990)	Peak position
US Billboard 200	124
US Top R&B/Hip-Hop Albums (Billboard)	6

=== Year-end charts ===
1990 year-end chart performance for All Hail the Queen
Chart (1990)	Position
US Top R&B/Hip-Hop Albums (Billboard)	25

== Charting singles ==
"All Hail The Queen Charting Singles"
Year	Single	U.S. Rap	U.S. R&B	U.S. Dance	U.S Dance Maxi Singles
1988	"Wrath of My Madness"	—	—	—	—
1989	"Dance For Me"	14	—	—	—
1989	"Ladies First" (12/5/1989)	5	64	38	—
1990	"Come Into My House"	21	81	7	10
1990	"Mama Gave Birth to the Soul Children"	—	—	28	—

== See also ==
- Album era
