= Bringing Down the House (film) =

2003 film by Adam Shankman

- Theatrical release poster
- Directed by: Adam Shankman
- Written by: Jason Filardi
- Produced by: David Hoberman; Ashok Amritraj
- Starring: Steve Martin; Queen Latifah; Eugene Levy; Jean Smart; Joan Plowright
- Cinematography: Julio Macat
- Edited by: Gerald B. Greenberg
- Music by: Lalo Schifrin
- Production companies: Touchstone Pictures; Hyde Park Entertainment; Mandeville Films
- Distributed by: Buena Vista Pictures Distribution
- Release date: March 7, 2003
- Running time: 105 minutes
- Country: United States
- Language: English
- Budget: $33 million
- Box office: $164.7 million

Bringing Down the House is a 2003 American comedy film written by Jason Filardi and directed by Adam Shankman and starring Steve Martin and Queen Latifah alongside Eugene Levy, Jean Smart, and Joan Plowright. The film features Martin as Peter Sanderson, a lonely lawyer who meets a woman on the Internet, only to learn she has escaped prison to prove her innocence. She then proceeds to wreak havoc on his own upper-class life. The film was released on March 7, 2003 by Touchstone Pictures and was distributed by Buena Vista Pictures.

== Plot ==
Peter Sanderson is a workaholic tax attorney, separated from his wife Kate and often too busy for their children, Sarah and Georgie.

Peter arranges a blind date at his home with Charlene Morton, a woman he has been chatting with online. Misled by her photograph and description, he is shocked to discover that she is actually a felon who corresponded with him from prison. Charlene tries to blackmail Peter into clearing her name of armed robbery, claiming she is innocent, but he throws her out after several attempts.

Just as Peter is about to meet with a difficult client, Mrs. Virginia Arness, he is ambushed by Charlene, who draws the lustful attention of his friend and colleague Howie Rottman. Agreeing to help expunge Charlene's record and let her stay at his house, Peter lies that she is his nanny. Charlene is disrespected by Kate's unpleasant, gold digging sister Ashley, but subdues her in a vicious locker-room brawl.

Peter takes Charlene to dinner, and Kate is upset to spot them dancing together. Returning home, Charlene coaches Peter on winning Kate back, and they are caught in a compromising position by Peter's bigoted neighbor, his boss' sister Mrs. Kline. Charlene helps Georgie overcome his struggles with reading, rescues Sarah from a party where she received unwanted advances from a boy named Mike and hangs him over the second floor balcony by his ankles and guides Peter toward becoming a more understanding parent and Sarah tells her dad everything that has been going on with her life.

Impressing Kate with his new commitment to spending time with their kids, Peter attempts to invite her over, but is interrupted by a call, to Kate's disappointment. He races home to meet Mrs. Arness, who invites herself to dinner and reminisces fondly about her family's degrading treatment of black servants, angering Charlene. Moments later, a news report appears on the television having broken out of prison, and includes security footage from a bank robbery, appearing to prove that a masked Charlene was responsible for the crime.

Mrs. Arness leaves, refusing to sign the lucrative contract for Peter's firm, Tobias, Kline, and Barnes, and Peter sends Charlene away. At the office, he discovers Mrs. Arness has notified the Federal Bureau of Investigation, and sneaks out to his car. He is threatened by Charlene's ex-boyfriend Widow (Steve Harris), who warns him not to reopen her case, but Peter manages to drive off. Realizing Widow framed Charlene, Peter returns home to ask for his children's help in finding Charlene.

Sarah admits that she gave Charlene Peter's cell phone, which Peter calls and picks Charlene up. He explains that she was set up by Widow, who is likely at a club downtown called the Down Low. Peter drops Charlene off at his house, saying he is returning to the office, but instead, goes to the club. Buying street clothes off a passer-by, Peter enters the club in disguise. Kate arrives at Peter's house to find the children waiting while the FBI searches the premises.

Charlene calls Howie to drive her to the home of Mrs. Arness where she refuses to let Charlene explain herself, leading Charlene and Howie to kidnap Mrs. Arness and her beloved French Bulldog William Shakespeare. Charlene also punches out Peter's former associate Todd Gendler. Charlene calls Sarah and realizes Peter went to the club, where Peter attempts to blend in, but is captured by Widow.

Peter gets Widow to confess to having committed the robbery disguised as Charlene. Arriving at the club, Mrs. Arness gets drunk and high while Charlene calls the police. Charlene and Howie confront Widow. After a scuffle for his gun, Widow shoots Charlene as the FBI storms into the club. Charlene is saved from the bullet by Peter's titanium cell phone, and Peter reveals that he recorded Widow's confession on a boombox, leading to Widow's arrest and exonerating Charlene.

Having secured Mrs. Arness as a multibillion-dollar client, Peter and Howie start their own firm, leaving their firm. Moving into their new office, Peter is surprised by Charlene, and they exchange thanks for their impact on each other's lives. Kate arrives, and she and Peter reconcile as his cell phone rings. He tosses it out the window and they kiss. Meanwhile, downstairs, Charlene and Howie appear to do the same.

== Cast ==
- Steve Martin as Peter Sanderson, an uptight lawyer who reluctantly helps Charlene with her case. They eventually bond, becoming close friends and she helps him rebuild his life, including helping him get Kate back.
- Queen Latifah as Charlene Morton, an escaped convict who was unjustly framed for armed robbery and seeks Peter's help in proving her innocence. Over the course of the film, she bonds with Peter and the family as she poses as their nanny.
- Eugene Levy as Howie Rottman, Peter's over-sexed best friend and colleague. He falls madly in love with Charlene upon meeting her.
- Joan Plowright as Virginia Arness, a wealthy client of Peter's.
- Kimberly J. Brown as Sarah Sanderson, Peter's daughter and older child.
- Angus T. Jones as Georgie Sanderson, Peter's son and younger child.
- Jean Smart as Kate Sanderson, Peter's estranged wife. It's apparent that they still harbor feelings for one another, as she is jealous of his new friendship with Charlene, believing them to be in a relationship.
- Missi Pyle as Ashley, Kate's openly promiscuous and gold-digging younger sister.
- Steve Harris as Widow, Charlene's shady ex-boyfriend.
- Michael Rosenbaum as Todd Gendler, Peter's arrogant colleague & apparent replacement.
- Betty White as Mrs. Kline, Peter's prejudiced neighbor.
- Jim Haynie as Ed Tobias, Peter, Howie and Todd's boss.
- Matt Lutz as Aaron
- Victor Webster as Glen
- Kelly Price as herself

== Soundtrack ==
A soundtrack containing hip hop and R&B music was released on March 4, 2003 by Hollywood Records. It peaked at 111 on the Billboard 200 and 23 on the Top R&B/Hip-Hop Albums.

== Release ==
=== Home media ===
Bringing Down the House was released on DVD and VHS on August 5, 2003 by Buena Vista.

== Reception ==
=== Critical response ===
Bringing Down the House received mostly unfavorable reviews from critics. On Rotten Tomatoes, the film has an approval rating of 33% based on 148 reviews, with an average rating of 4.9/10. The site's consensus reads, "Though the cast shines, they can't save this comedy, which is overly contrived and filled with outdated and offensive racial jokes." On Metacritic, the film has a score of 39 out of 100 based on reviews from 31 critics, indicating "generally unfavorable" reviews. Audiences surveyed by CinemaScore gave the film a grade B+ on scale of A to F.

Todd McCarthy of Variety wrote, "There are certainly good laughs to be had. But the contrived script and bland direction prevent the film from ever developing a comic life of its own, leaving what fun there is seeming like the foundation to a rumpus room that's never finished."

=== Box office ===
Earning $31.7 million during its opening weekend, Bringing Down the House had the third-highest March opening weekend, behind Ice Age and Blade II. On a budget of $35 million, the film became a surprise hit, spending three weeks at No. 1 in the United States. It earned $132.6 million in the United States and an international gross of $32 million, bringing its worldwide gross to $164.6 million.

=== Accolades ===
Queen Latifah

- Won – Teen Choice Awards 2003 for Choice Movie Actress Comedy
- Won – NAACP Image Award for Outstanding Actress in a Motion Picture
- Nominated – MTV Movie Award for Best Performance
- Nominated – MTV Movie Award for Best Fight (shared with Missi Pyle)

Steve Martin

- Nominated – MTV Movie Award for Best Dance Sequence
