= Life Support (2007 film) =

2007 made-for-TV drama film directed by Nelson George

- Written by: Nelson George; Jim McKay; Hannah Weyer
- Directed by: Nelson George
- Starring: Queen Latifah; Wendell Pierce; Evan Ross; Anna Deavere Smith; Tracee Ellis Ross
- Country of origin: United States
- Original language: English

Production
- Producer: Mark A. Baker

Original release
- Network: HBO
- Release: March 10, 2007

Life Support is a 2007 American drama television film directed by Nelson George and starring Queen Latifah. It is loosely based on the real-life story of Ana Wallace, an HIV-positive woman.

The film premiered on January 26, 2007, at the 2007 Sundance Film Festival and premiered on HBO on March 10, 2007.

== Plot ==
Ana Wallace (Queen Latifah) was diagnosed with HIV 11 years ago. She got the virus from shooting cocaine with her boyfriend, Slick (Wendell Pierce). Slick had the virus first but did not tell Ana he had it. Ana is devoted to her work at Life Support, an AIDS outreach group, but she struggles to repair her relationship with her teenage daughter, whom she lost custody of 11 years ago due to her drug addiction.

== Cast ==
- Queen Latifah as Ana Wallace
- Anna Deavere Smith as Lucille
- Wendell Pierce as "Slick"
- Rachel Nicks as Kelly Wallace
- Evan Ross as Amare
- Gloria Reuben as Sandra
- Tony Rock as Ness
- Darrin Dewitt Henson as "MJ2"
- Tracee Ellis Ross as Tanya
- Limary L. Agosto as Woman #1
- Carlos Alban as Andre
- Brandon Scott as Markus
- Sidné Anderson as Sister Bernice
- Dorothea Golden as Peer Counselor #1
- Chyna Layne as Deyah
- Angel Magee as Peer Counselor #2
- Andrea Williams as herself

== Critical reception ==
Critics gave the film favorable reviews. On the review aggregator Metacritic, the film had an average score of 77 out of 100, based on nine reviews.

== Awards and nominations ==
Year	Award	Category	Nominee(s)	Result	Ref.
2007	Artios Awards	Outstanding Achievement in Casting – TV Movie of the Week	Aleta Chappelle	Nominated	
2007	Online Film & Television Association Awards	Best Motion Picture		Nominated	
2007	Online Film & Television Association Awards	Best Actress in a Motion Picture or Miniseries	Queen Latifah	Nominated	
2007	Primetime Emmy Awards	Outstanding Lead Actress in a Miniseries or a Movie	Queen Latifah	Nominated	
2007	Primetime Creative Arts Emmy Awards	Outstanding Single-Camera Picture Editing for a Miniseries or a Movie	Mary Jo Markey	Nominated	
2007	Satellite Awards	Best Motion Picture Made for Television		Nominated	
2007	Satellite Awards	Best Actress in a Miniseries or Motion Picture Made for Television	Queen Latifah	Nominated	
2007	Women Film Critics Circle Awards	Best Female Images in a Movie	Queen Latifah	Won	
2007	Women Film Critics Circle Awards	Best Theatrically Unreleased Movie by or About Women		Won	
2008	American Cinema Editors Awards	Best Edited Miniseries or Motion Picture for Non-Commercial Television	Mary Jo Markey	Nominated	
2008	Golden Globe Awards	Best Actress – Miniseries or Television Film	Queen Latifah	Won	
2008	Gracie Awards	Outstanding Female Lead – Drama Series or Special	Queen Latifah	Won	
2008	NAACP Image Awards	Outstanding Television Movie, Mini-Series or Dramatic Special		Won	
2008	NAACP Image Awards	Outstanding Actor in a Television Movie, Mini-Series or Dramatic Special	Wendell Pierce	Won	
2008	NAACP Image Awards	Outstanding Actor in a Television Movie, Mini-Series or Dramatic Special	Evan Ross	Nominated	
2008	NAACP Image Awards	Outstanding Actress in a Television Movie, Mini-Series or Dramatic Special	Queen Latifah	Won	
2008	Screen Actors Guild Awards	Outstanding Performance by a Female Actor in a Miniseries or Television Movie	Queen Latifah	Won	
