= Barbershop =

Barbershop may refer to:

- A place where barbers work
- Barbershop music, an a cappella musical style
  - Barbershop quartet, a group of four singers

== Barbershop franchise ==
- Barbershop (franchise), an American comedy film franchise
  - Barbershop (film), a 2002 American comedy film directed by Tim Story
    - Barbershop (soundtrack), a soundtrack album from the film
  - Barbershop 2: Back in Business, a 2004 American comedy film directed by Kevin Rodney Sullivan
    - Barbershop 2: Back in Business (soundtrack), a soundtrack album from the film
  - Barbershop: The Next Cut, a 2016 American comedy film directed by Malcolm D. Lee
    - Barbershop: The Next Cut (soundtrack), a soundtrack album from the film
  - Barbershop (2005 TV series), a sitcom based on the films
  - Barbershop (2027 TV series), an upcoming comedy drama based on the films

== Other uses ==
- Barbershop Canyon, a valley in Arizona
- Barbershop Harmony Society, an organization for barbershop music
  - Barbershop in Germany, an affiliate association for barbershop music in Germany
  - British Association of Barbershop Singers, an affiliate association for barbershop music in United Kingdom
- The Barbershop, an 1894 American short narrative film directed by William K.L. Dickson and William Heise
- Barbershop paradox, a historically interesting logic problem by Lewis Carroll
- Kapsalon (English: "barbershop") is a Dutch fast food
- "Barbershop" (Atlanta), 2018 TV episode
