= Barbershop (2005 TV series) =

American sitcom

- Based on: Characters by Mark Brown
- Developed by: John Ridley
- Starring: Omar Gooding; Gbenga Akinnagbe; Anna Brown; Wes Chatham; Leslie Elliard; Barry Shabaka Henley; Toni Trucks; Dan White
- Composers: Steve Hampton; John Adair
- Country of origin: United States
- Original language: English
- No. of seasons: 1
- No. of episodes: 10

Production
- Camera setup: Single-camera
- Running time: 30 minutes
- Production companies: State Street Pictures; International Famous Players Radio Pictures Corporation; Cube Vision; MGM Television

Original release
- Network: Showtime
- Release: August 14 – October 16, 2005

Related
- Barbershop: The Next Cut (2016 film)

Barbershop: The Series is an American sitcom which made its debut on Showtime in August 2005. It is based upon the Mark Brown–created characters from the popular films Barbershop (2002) and Barbershop 2: Back in Business (2004), and was developed for television by screenwriter John Ridley. It stars Omar Gooding as Calvin Palmer, Jr., the proprietor of an African-American barbershop on the South Side of Chicago.

The series was produced by Barbershop and Barbershop 2 producers George Tillman, Jr. and Robert Teitel, along with original Barbershop star Ice Cube, and co-executive produced by Matt Wickline. It lasted for only one season, and ten episodes were aired (seven of which were written by Ridley).

== Production ==
While the original films were no stranger to controversy, the series uses humor to more deeply explore a variety of issues related to the contemporary African-American community, including drug abuse, entrepreneurship, local politics, and the use of the N-word.

Continuing from the events of Barbershop 2, the series makes several minor changes. Isaac's surname is changed from Rosenberg to Brice (and the dark-haired man becomes a blond). The Nigerian-born Dinka is renamed "Yinka", as Yinka is an actual Nigerian name, while Dinka is not. Additionally, Dinka was naive and slightly overweight, while Yinka is well-educated and muscular. Ricky, the reformed criminal, is replaced by a more hardened ex-con, Jen's distant relative Romadal Dupree. Finally, Isaac and Jimmy (instead of Yinka) each harbor a crush on Terri.

== Cast and characters ==
- Omar Gooding as Calvin Palmer, Jr. Calvin is the owner of Calvin Jr.’s Barbershop, first opened in 1958 as "Calvin's Barbershop" by his father Calvin Palmer, Sr. He and his wife Jen have a son, Cody.

The character was first portrayed in the original Barbershop film by Ice Cube.

- Gbenga Akinnagbe as Yinka. An immigrant from Nigeria, Yinka fled that country to escape local sectarian violence. He is by far the most well-educated employee at the barbershop.

The character was first portrayed in the original Barbershop film (where he was named Dinka) by Leonard Earl Howze.

- Anna Brown as Jen Palmer. Jen is a homemaker, and has studied hotel management in community college. She and her husband Calvin have a son, Cody.

The character was first portrayed in the original Barbershop film by Jazsmin Lewis.

- Wes Chatham as Isaac Brice. Isaac is a White man raised in African-American neighborhoods, and exclusively dates women of color. He is particularly attracted to his fellow barber Terri Jones.

The character was first portrayed in the original Barbershop film (where he was named Isaac Rosenberg) by Troy Garity.

- Leslie Elliard as Jimmy James. A former employee at the barbershop, Jimmy quit to pursue a career in local politics. Jimmy goes to great lengths to appear more important than is actually the case. He is politically conservative, and considers Calvin to be his best friend.

The character was first portrayed in the original Barbershop film by Sean Patrick Thomas.

- Barry Shabaka Henley as Eddie Walker. The oldest employee at the barbershop, Eddie was hired by Calvin Palmer, Sr. on Independence Day 1967. As explained in Barbershop 2, Eddie prevented the shop from being looted or firebombed during the King-assassination riots in April 1968. In return, Calvin Sr. decreed that Eddie would never again have to pay rent for his chair. Eddie often tells tall tales about his past, and frequently complains that the current generation has no values or sense of history.

The character was first portrayed in the original Barbershop film by Cedric the Entertainer.

- Toni Trucks as Terri Jones. Terri is the only female barber at Calvin Jr.'s. She is very quick to anger, and her short temper affects almost all of her interpersonal relationships.

The character was first portrayed in the original Barbershop film by Eve.

- Dan White as Romadal Dupree. Romadal is a distant relative of Jen Palmer, who convinced Calvin to hire him. He is an ex-con who was recently released from prison, and is feared throughout the South Side. He has no real skills as a barber.

Unlike the other major characters, Romadal originated in this series.

== Episodes ==
No.	Title	Directed by	Written by	Original release date	Prod. code
1	"This is My Bullshit, and You're Welcome to It"	John Ridley	John Ridley	August 14, 2005	101
Jen convinces Calvin to hire her distant relative Romadal Dupree, who has just been released from prison. Calvin teaches Yinka how to talk dirty to a woman during sex. Terri is forced to confront her anger issues after her identity is stolen. Jimmy tries to use his nonexistent political clout to do a favor for Jen.
2	"Nigger, Lovers"	John Ridley	John Ridley	August 21, 2005	102
"Niggaz", an urban fashion chain store owned by African-Americans, opens a franchise in the neighborhood. But when the owner of the new store turns out to be Korean-American, some residents are outraged by the use of the N-word . . . and Jimmy takes full advantage of the situation. Terri is attracted to the son of the new store owner. Big Tricky (Page Kennedy) wants his cousin Romadal to be the spokesman for his new hip-hop CD, but he needs Calvin's approval first.
3	"Madonna is a 'Ho (and Dana's Fucking Blind)"	Kevin Bray	John Ridley	August 28, 2005	103
Calvin and Jen have dinner with David and Dana Kang (Kipp Shiotani, Lauren Tom), who are constantly cursing at each other in public. Michael Kang (Yun Choi) breaks up with Terri, while Isaac begins seeing Michael's sister Michelle (Camille Chen). Eddie picks up a gorgeous woman (Sheryl Lee Ralph) in a bar.
4	"Whose Pussy is That?"	Linda Mendoza	John Ridley	September 4, 2005	104
Yinka tries new dirty talk on Jen's gynecologist (Victoria Platt). Jen competes with her sister Jan to find the perfect gift for Calvin's birthday. Terri finds marijuana in Romadal's locker, after which Issac, Yinka and Eddie join her in smoking it while on the job. The Kang siblings try to hide their flings with Terri and Isaac from their mother Dana. Jimmy decides to run for alderman. Eddie discovers that Claire is a transsexual.
5	"What's Good for the Cos..."	Millicent Shelton	John Ridley	September 11, 2005	105
The barbershop staff (along with Jen and Jimmy) attends one of Bill Cosby's lectures on personal responsibility in the African-American community. Terri and Yinka continue to smoke marijuana at the barbershop, which drastically affects their work performance. Isaac, who only dates women of color, decides to try dating White women. Eddie is in turmoil after learning the truth about Claire. Calvin learns that his late father had a second family . . . including a White wife and adult biracial children.
6	"A Black Man Invented the Stoplight"	Linda Mendoza	John Ridley	September 18, 2005	106
Calvin learns that his mother and brother (Roz Ryan, Phil LaMarr) have known about his father's second family for years. The former mayor of Chicago (John Rubinstein) decides to run against Jimmy. After discovering Terri and Yinka's drug habits, Calvin forces them to enter drug rehab, led by an extremely confrontational drug counselor (Kevin Hart). Eddie's friends question his "deviant behavior" with Claire. Jen and Dana decide to open an urban bed and breakfast. Malcolm (A. Doran Reed) sues Calvin for invasion of privacy after he is caught on the surveillance cameras having sex in the back of the barbershop.
7	"Family Business"	Lee Shallat Chemel	Matt Wickline	September 25, 2005	107
Jen and Dana get help from Big Tricky and Da Boot (Kia Joy Goodwin) in developing their urban bed and breakfast. Calvin neglects the barbershop while spending time with his "other" family (Tanya Roberts, Christopher "Kid" Reid, Kendra Smith). Malcolm drops the lawsuit after Romadal attacks him. Jimmy's campaign manager (Lalanya Masters) starts to question whether Jimmy can win the election. Terri and her drug counselor James Ricky begin a very odd sexual relationship.
8	"Debates and Dead People"	Ken Whittingham	Lance Crouther	October 2, 2005	108
Calvin continues to spend time with his other family, and the barbershop suffers in his absence. Isaac steals a famous client from Yinka, and the two barbers eventually come to blows. A ventroliquist and his dummy cause trouble for Jen and Dana at the bed and breakfast. Yinka falls in love with a married Nigerian woman (Nzinga Blake). Romadal is arrested for assault.
9	"The Politics of Money"	Lee Shallat Chemel	Stacy A. Littlejohn	October 9, 2005	109
When Isaac puts his celebrity clientele ahead of his regular job, Calvin fires him. Jimmy tries to raise funds and support for his faltering campaign. Calvin puts up the barbershop as collateral to bail Romadal out of jail . . . but then Romadal disappears. After learning that Vivian will be put to death upon her return to Nigeria, Yinka helps her seek sanctuary at the bed and breakfast.
10	"Crimes of the Heart"	John Ridley	John Ridley	October 16, 2005	110
After Romadal jumps bail, Calvin tries to track him down to avoid losing the barbershop. As Election Day approaches, Jimmy seeks an endorsement from Eddie, who was "like a son" to the late Chicago mayor Harold Washington. Isaac and Terri finally give in to their mutual attraction and consummate their relationship. Yinka learns that Vivian is not as innocent as he thought. Shocking turns of events leave both Jen and Jimmy in desperate need of cash. [This episode was intended to be the first season finale. However, Showtime subsequently cancelled the series, making this the last episode.]
