= Barbershop (franchise) =

American film franchise

- Official franchise logo
- Based on: Characters created by Mark Brown
- Starring: Ice Cube; Queen Latifah; Various actors (See details below)
- Production companies: New Line Cinema (3); Cube Vision
- Distributed by: Metro-Goldwyn-Mayer (1–3); Warner Bros. Pictures (4)
- Country: United States
- Language: English
- Budget: Total (4 films): $87 million
- Box office: Total (4 films): $235,310,741

The Barbershop franchise consists of American comedy installments including four theatrical movies, and two television shows. Based on an original story by Mark Brown, the plot centers around the social lives of and the events that employees of a barbershop on social life in a barbershop on the South Side of Chicago, Illinois encounter.

The series received generally positive reviews and grossed over $235 million worldwide.

== Films ==
| Film | U.S. release date | Director | Screenwriter(s) | Story by | Producers |
|---|---|---|---|---|---|
| Barbershop | September 13, 2002 | Tim Story | Mark Brown, Don D. Scott & Marshall Todd | Mark Brown | Mark Brown, Robert Teitel & George Tillman Jr. |
| Barbershop 2: Back in Business | February 6, 2004 | Kevin Rodney Sullivan | Don D. Scott | Don D. Scott | Alex Gartner, Robert Teitel & George Tillman Jr. |
| Beauty Shop | March 30, 2005 | Bille Woodruff | Kate Lanier & Norman Vance Jr. | Elizabeth Hunter | Queen Latifah, Robert Teitel, David Hoberman, Shakim Compere & George Tillman Jr. |
| Barbershop: The Next Cut | April 15, 2016 | Malcolm D. Lee | Kenya Barris & Tracy Oliver | Kenya Barris & Tracy Oliver | Ice Cube, Robert Teitel & George Tillman Jr. |

=== Barbershop (2002) ===
A smart comedy about a day in a barbershop on the south side of Chicago. Calvin (Ice Cube), who inherited the struggling business from his deceased father, views the shop as nothing but a burden and a waste of his time. After selling the shop to a local loan shark, Calvin slowly begins to see his father's vision and legacy and struggles with the notion that he just sold it out.

=== Barbershop 2: Back in Business (2004) ===
This sequel to the 2002 film returns to the Chicago barbershop owned by Calvin Palmer Jr. (Ice Cube). His employees—Isaac (Troy Garity), Terri (Eve), Ricky (Michael Ealy), Dinka (Leonard Earl Howze) and Kenard (Kenan Thompson)—have their own personal and workplace problems, and a new barbershop called Nappy Cutz has moved in across the street. As Calvin tries to change the character of his business, Nappy Cutz and gentrification become a threat to the surrounding community.

=== Beauty Shop (2005) ===
A spin-off from the first two Barbershop films, Gina Norris (Queen Latifah) is a widowed hairstylist who has moved from Chicago to Atlanta so her daughter, Vanessa (Paige Hurd), can attend a private music school. She has made a name for herself as a stylist, but after her self-centered boss, Jorge (Kevin Bacon), criticizes her decisions, she leaves and sets up her own shop, purchasing a run-down salon by the skin of her teeth by helping out a loan officer.

=== Barbershop: The Next Cut (2016) ===
Malcolm D. Lee directs, while Ice Cube and Cedric the Entertainer are among the cast of the film. The film was released on April 15, 2016.

== Television series ==
=== Barbershop (2027) ===
In April 2023, after previously acquiring MGM, Amazon announced plans to expand the franchise with a new television series in development through Amazon Studios. In May 2025, the show received an official order with original co-writer Marshall Todd serving as co-showrunner alongside Max Searle. Alongside Todd and Searle, the show is executive produced by Kevin Hart, Autumn Bailey-Ford, Bradley Gardner, Bryan Smiley, Cameron Burnett, and Mike Stein, with Jermaine Fowler playing the main protagonist Travis "Trav" Porter. In November 2025, more cast members were announced with Roy Wood Jr., Punkie Johnson, Brett Gray, and E. J. Bonilla. In October 2026, Prime Video announced that the series was scheduled to premiere on February 10, 2027.

== Main cast and characters ==
| Characters | Films | | | | Television series |
| Characters | Main series | | | Spin-off film | Television series |
| Characters | Barbershop | Barbershop 2: Back in Business | Barbershop: The Next Cut | Beauty Shop | Barbershop |
|---|---|---|---|---|---|
| Characters | 2002 | 2004 | 2016 | 2005 | 2005 |
| Calvin Palmer, Jr. | Ice Cube | Ice Cube | Ice Cube | | Omar Gooding |
| Eddie Walker | Cedric the Entertainer | Cedric the Entertainer | Cedric the Entertainer | | Barry Shabaka Henley |
| Terri Jones | Eve | Eve | Eve | | Toni Trucks |
| Jimmy James | Sean Patrick Thomas | Sean Patrick Thomas | Sean Patrick Thomas | | Leslie Elliard |
| Isaac Rosenberg | Troy Garity | Troy Garity | Troy Garity | | Wes Chatham (Note: In the Barbershop television series, Issac's last name was changed to Brice.) |
| Jennifer Palmer | Jazsmin Lewis | Jazsmin Lewis | Jazsmin Lewis | | Anna Brown |
| Ricky Nash | Michael Ealy | Michael Ealy | | | |
| Dinka | Leonard Earl Howze | Leonard Earl Howze | | | Gbenga Akinnagbe (Note: In the Barbershop television series, Dinka's name was changed to Yinka.) |
| Rayford | DeRay Davis | DeRay Davis | | | |
| Detective Williams | Tom Wright | Tom Wright | | | |
| Customer Dante | Deon Cole | Deon Cole | Deon Cole | | |
| J.D. | Anthony Anderson | | Anthony Anderson | | |
| Billy | Lahmard Tate | | | | |
| Lester Wallace | Keith David | | | | |
| Monk | Kevyn Morrow | | | | |
| Kevin | Jason George | | | | |
| Gina Norris | | Queen Latifah | | Queen Latifah | |
| Quentin Leroux | | Harry J. Lennix | | | |
| Kenard | | Kenan Thompson | | | |
| Lalowe Brown | | Robert Wisdom | | | |
| Loretta | | Garcelle Beauvais | | | |
| Gina's niece | | Keke Palmer | | | |
| Angie | | | Regina Hall | | |
| Draya | | | Nicki Minaj | | |
| Rashad | | | Common | | |
| Bree | | | Margot Bingham | | |
| Jerrod | | | Lamorne Morris | | |
| Raja | | | Utkarsh Ambudkar | | |
| One Stop | | | J. B. Smoove | | |
| Lynn | | | | Alicia Silverstone | |
| Terri | | | | Andie MacDowell | |
| Ms. Josephine | | | | Alfre Woodard | |
| Joanne Marcus | | | | Mena Suvari | |
| Jorge | | | | Kevin Bacon | |
| Joe | | | | Djimon Hounsou | |
| Romadal Dupree | | | | | Dan White |

Note: A light grey cell indicates the character who did not appear in that film.

== Additional production and crew details ==
| Title | Crew/detail | | | | | |
| Title | Composer(s) | Cinematographer | Editor(s) | Production companies | Distributing company | Running time |
|---|---|---|---|---|---|---|
| Barbershop | Terence Blanchard | Tom Priestley Jr. | John Carter | Cube Vision; Metro-Goldwyn-Mayer; State Street Pictures | MGM Distribution Co. | 1 hr 42 mins |
| Barbershop 2: Back in Business | Richard Gibbs | Tom Priestley Jr. | Paul Seydor; Patrick Flannery | Cube Vision; Metro-Goldwyn-Mayer; State Street Pictures | MGM Distribution Co. | 1 hr 46 mins |
| Beauty Shop | Christopher Young | Theo van de Sande | Michael Jablow | Mandeville Films; Metro-Goldwyn-Mayer; State Street Pictures; Flavor Unit Entertainment | MGM Distribution Co. | 1 hr 45 mins |
| Barbershop: The Series | John Adair; Ryan Elder; David Korkis; Steve Hampton | Geary McLeod | John Murray; Stuart Bass; Brad Durante; Steve Edwards | Cube Vision; MGM Television; State Street Pictures; Radio Pictures Corporation; International Famous Players | Showtime | 5 hrs (30 min/episodes) |
| Barbershop: The Next Cut | Stanley Clarke | Greg Gardiner | Paul Millspaugh | Cube Vision; New Line Cinema; Metro-Goldwyn-Mayer; State Street Pictures | Warner Bros. Pictures | 1 hr 52 mins |

== Reception ==
=== Critical reception ===
| Film | Critical | | Public |
| Film | Rotten Tomatoes | Metacritic | CinemaScore |
|---|---|---|---|
| Barbershop | 83% (126 reviews) | 66 (29 reviews) | A− |
| Barbershop 2: Back in Business | 68% (126 reviews) | 59 (34 reviews) | A− |
| Beauty Shop | 38% (119 reviews) | 53 (28 reviews) | A− |
| Barbershop: The Next Cut | 90% (93 reviews) | 67 (30 reviews) | A− |

=== Box office performance ===
| Film | Release date | Revenue | | | Budget | Ref. |
| Film | Release date | U.S. and Canada | Other territories | Worldwide | Budget | Ref. |
|---|---|---|---|---|---|---|
| Barbershop | September 13, 2002 | $75,782,105 | $1,281,819 | $77,063,924 | $12 million | |
| Barbershop 2: Back in Business | February 6, 2004 | $65,111,277 | $860,036 | $65,971,313 | $30 million | |
| Beauty Shop | March 30, 2005 | $36,351,350 | $894,103 | $37,245,453 | $25 million | |
| Barbershop: The Next Cut | April 15, 2016 | $54,030,051 | $1,000,000 | $55,030,051 | $20 million | |
| Total | | $231,274,783 | $4,035,958 | $235,310,741 | $87 million | |
