= DeRay Davis =

American comedian and actor

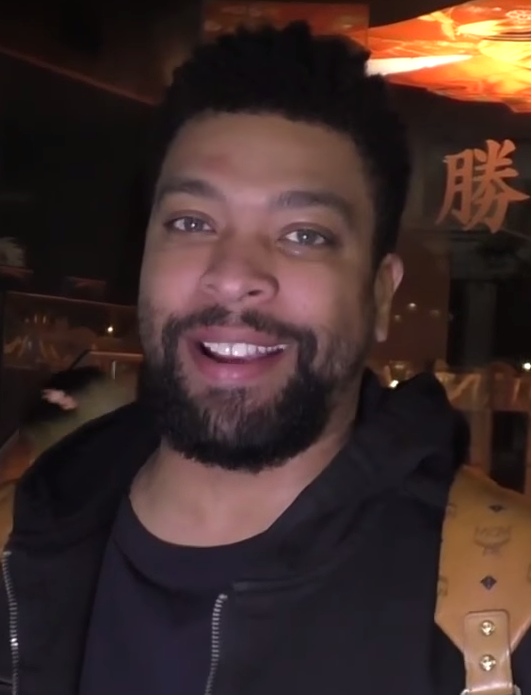
- Davis in 2016
- Born: Antoine DeRay Davis; February 26, 1982 (age 44); Chicago, Illinois, U.S.
- Occupations: Comedian; actor
- Years active: 1998–present
- Children: 1
- Website: deraydavis.com

Antoine DeRay Davis (born February 26, 1982) is an American stand-up comedian and actor. He is known for his role as Ray the Hustle Guy in the Barbershop films, Peaches in the FX TV series Snowfall, and as host of Hip Hop Squares. He is also known for his collaboration and appearances in several audio skits by Kanye West.

== Life and career ==
Davis was born in Chicago, Illinois. He began his career in comedy clubs. Shortly after moving to Los Angeles, he won the Comedy Central Laugh Riots Competition and appeared on the Cedric the Entertainer Tour. Known for his role as Ray the Hustle Guy in Barbershop and Barbershop 2: Back in Business, Davis has also appeared in other films, including Semi-Pro, 21 Jump Street, and How High 2. Davis' television roles and appearances have included programs such as Comedy Central's Reno 911, BET's ComicView, FOX's Empire, MTV's Wild 'n Out and Short Circuitz, FX's Snowfall, and HBO's Entourage. He hosted his first game show, Mind of a Man, on Game Show Network, and later appeared on the Oxygen reality show Living with Funny. He is also the host of the revival of Hip Hop Squares produced & narrated by Ice Cube.

The comedian also sounds on several skits on rapper Kanye West's albums The College Dropout and Late Registration, impersonating Bernie Mac in both album's opening tracks "Intro" and "Wake Up Mr. West", and appearing as the lead of the fictitious fraternity "Broke Phi Broke." Davis, also appeared in West's music video for "Through the Wire." Other music video appearances for Davis include Lil' Flip's "Game Over (Flip)", Chris Brown's "Yo (Excuse Me Miss)," Three 6 Mafia's "Doe Boy Fresh", Outkast's "Roses", and Cassie's "Long Way 2 Go."

== Filmography ==
=== Film ===
| Year | Film | Role | Notes |
|---|---|---|---|
| 2002 | Frank McKlusky, C.I. | Basketball Player | |
| 2002 | Play'd: A Hip Hop Story | Jaxx's Bodyguard | TV movie |
| 2002 | Barbershop | Ray | |
2004
| 2004 | Full Clip | Preacher | |
| 2004 | Barbershop 2: Back in Business | Ray | |
| 2004 | Johnson Family Vacation | Jamaican Stoner | |
| 2004 | The Seat Filler | E.J. | |
| 2004 | Jiminy Glick in Lalawood | Mario 'FA REAL' Greene | |
| 2004 | The Big Black Comedy Show, Vol. 1 | Himself | Video |
| 2005 | The Fog | Spooner | |
| 2006 | Scary Movie 4 | Marvin | |
| 2006 | School for Scoundrels | Bee Bee | |
| 2006 | Who Made the Potatoe Salad? | Junebug | |
| 2007 | Code Name: The Cleaner | Ronnie | |
| 2007 | License to Wed | Joel | |
| 2007 | The Hit | Sirus | |
| 2008 | How She Move | Himself | |
| 2008 | Semi-Pro | Bee Bee Ellis | |
| 2009 | Frankenhood | Motown | |
| 2009 | Imagine That | John | |
| 2009 | 3 of Us | - | |
| 2009 | Old Dogs | Zoo Security Guard | |
| 2010 | Get Him to the Greek | Sugar Bones | |
| 2010 | Life as We Know It | Lonnie | |
| 2010 | My Girlfriend's Back | Kenyatta | |
| 2011 | Jumping the Broom | Malcolm | |
| 2012 | 21 Jump Street | Domingo | |
| 2013 | G.I. Joe: Retaliation | Stoop | |
| 2013 | A Very Larry Christmas | Larry Huffman | |
| 2014 | Mr. Right | Mr. Right | Short |
| 2014 | Drumline: A New Beat | Kevin Taylor | TV movie |
| 2015 | My Favorite Five | Sans | |
| 2015 | Football U | Troy DoneDat | |
| 2015 | Chocolate City | Chris McCoy | |
| 2016 | Meet the Blacks | Tyrone | |
| 2016 | Barbershop: A Fresh Cut | Ray | |
| 2016 | Wild for the Night | Fiorentino | |
| 2017 | Grow House | Pat | |
| 2017 | All Eyez on Me | Legs | |
| 2017 | Lady Bouncer | Bromley | Short |
| 2017 | Starship Troopers: Traitor of Mars | One-Oh-One (voice) | |
| 2019 | How High 2 | Big Bang | TV movie |
| 2019 | Gully | Calvin's Father | |

=== Television ===
| Year | Series | Role | Notes |
|---|---|---|---|
| 2000 | Premium Blend | Himself | Episode: "Episode #4.9" |
| 2000-01 | It's Showtime at the Apollo | Himself | Episode: "Episode #13.18" & "#14.21" |
| 2001 | Late Friday | Himself | Episode: "Episode #1.27" |
| 2001 | ComicView | Himself | Episode: "Comics in the Spotlight: DeRay and Big O" |
| 2002-03 | My Wife and Kids | R.J. | Guest: Season 2, Recurring Cast: Season 3–4 |
| 2004 | Judge Mooney | Tony | TV Series |
| 2005 | Love Lounge | Himself | Recurring Guest |
| 2005 | Access Granted | Himself | Episode: "Chris Brown: Yo" |
| 2005 | Entourage | Hack | Episode: "Chinatown" |
| 2005-07 | Reno 911! | Timpathy the Criminal | Recurring Cast: Season 3, Guest: Season 4 |
| 2005-22 | Wild 'n Out | Himself | Main Cast: Season 1-10 & 15-21 |
| 2006 | Comedy Central Presents | Himself | Episode: "DeRay Davis" |
| 2006 | Lallapalooza | Himself | Episode: "Lallapalooza Volume 7" |
| 2006-08 | Def Comedy Jam | Himself | Episode: "Episode #7.5" & "#8.6" |
| 2007 | HBO First Look | Himself | Episode: "'License to Wed': Behind the Vows" |
| 2007-10 | The Boondocks | Additional Voices (voice) | Supporting Cast: Season 2-3 |
| 2008 | ComicView | Himself | Episode: "ComicView: One Mic Stand" |
| 2009 | The Girls Next Door | Himself | Episode: "Charity Begins at Holmby" |
| 2009 | Nite Tales: The Series | Omar | Episode: "Night Watch" |
| 2012 | The Game | Himself | Episode: "Grand Opening, Grand Closing" |
| 2012 | Black Dynamite | Additional Voices (voice) | Supporting Cast: Season 1 |
| 2013 | Kroll Show | Lemon Lime | Episode: "Secret Room" |
| 2013 | Second Generation Wayans | DeRay | Recurring Cast |
| 2013 | The League | Boris | Episode: "Rafi and Dirty Randy" |
| 2014 | Mind of a Man | Himself/Host | Main Host |
| 2014 | Comics Unleashed | Himself | Recurring Guest |
| 2015 | Empire | Jermel | Guest Cast: Season 1-2 |
| 2015-16 | Joking Off | Himself/Host | Main Host |
| 2017 | Dish Nation | Himself/Guest Co-Host | Episode: "Episode #5.159" |
| 2017 | Big Bad BBQ Brawl | Himself/Judge | Episode: "Double Trouble Brawl: Seafood Two Ways" |
| 2017 | Face Value | Himself/Team Captain | Episode: "Estelle Vs. DeRay Davis" |
| 2017 | All Def Comedy | Himself | Episode: "Episode #1.2" |
| 2017 | The Real | Himself/Guest Co-Host | Episode: "DeRay Davis/David Arquette/Camilla Luddington/Hurry to the Hunk" |
| 2017-19 | Hip Hop Squares | Himself/Host | Main Host |
| 2018 | Black Card Revoked | Himself | Episode: "Blac Chyna, DeRay Davis, LeToya Luckett" |
| 2018 | This Is Not Happening | Himself | Episode: "Dads" |
| 2018 | BET Hip Hop Awards | Himself/Host | Main Host |
| 2018-23 | Snowfall | Peaches | Recurring Cast: Season 2–5, Guest: Season 6 |
| 2019 | Tales | Davenport | Episode: "Slippery" |
| 2020 | I Can See Your Voice | Himself/Panelist | Episode: "Episode 3 & 8" |
| 2021 | History of Swear Words | Himself | Main Guest |
| 2022 | Phat Tuesdays: The Era Of Hip Hop Comedy | Himself | Recurring Guest |
| 2022 | So Dumb It's Criminal: Hosted by Snoop Dogg | Himself/Panelist | Episode: "Clean Up on Aisle Criminal!" |
| 2022 | Black Music Honors | Himself/Co-Host | Main Co-Host |
| 2022 | The Chi | Master Marshawn | Recurring Cast: Season 5 |

=== Stand-up Special ===
| Year | Program |
|---|---|
| 2017 | How to Act Black |

Media offices
| Preceded by Peter Rosenberg; 2012 Hip Hop Squares | Host of Hollywood Squares franchise 2017-present (Hip Hop Squares) | Succeeded by Bob Saget; Nashville Squares Concurrent version in 2019 |
