= Auntie Fee =

YouTube cooking show star (1957–2017)

- Born: Felicia Arlene O'Dell; May 7, 1957; New Orleans, Louisiana
- Died: March 18, 2017 (aged 59); Los Angeles, California
- Other name: Chef Sista Girl
- Occupation: Internet personality

YouTube information
- Channel: AuntieFee
- Years active: 2014–2017
- Subscribers: 874,000
- Views: 107 million
- Last updated: August 3, 2026
- Website: www.auntiefee.com

Felicia Arlene O'Dell (May 7, 1957 – March 18, 2017), best-known by her moniker "Auntie Fee", was an American YouTube personality and viral cooking star based in Los Angeles, California, whose YouTube videos have earned, and continue to earn, millions of views and likes. Auntie Fee first gained popularity on YouTube in the early 2010s with her foul-mouthed, highly descriptive, no-holds-barred style of cooking videos.

== Early and personal life ==
O'Dell was born in New Orleans, Louisiana, one of ten children; her father was James O'Dell, a carpenter, plumber, and electrician. She said she knew how to cook by the age of nine after growing up preparing some of her father's favorite dishes, including gumbo, hog's head cheese, and red beans and rice. However, O'Dell's relationship with her father was a difficult one; at age 15, she informed her father that she was pregnant, further estranging their relationship. Still, she later described her father as being a caring person, saying he "would give you whatever he had," in an interview with the Los Angeles Times.

O'Dell attended John C. Fremont High School but dropped out during her senior year and subsequently developed a drug habit. She was eventually caught and arrested for selling drugs out of her home, and served time in prison. There are conflicting reports on how long she was in prison. One report says she was incarcerated for only a "few years" in an Arkansas prison. Another source, quoting O'Dell herself, reports that she served 10 years of a total 20-year prison sentence; O'Dell also claimed to have taken responsibility for a crime she didn't commit. Nonetheless, she was released in 1992, and is said to have remained drug-free for the rest of her life.

== YouTube and fame ==
O'Dell became a viral cooking and comedy star in July 2014 when her son Tavis (her cameraman, sidekick, and comedic antagonizer) began recording and uploading videos to YouTube showcasing his mother's home-cooking skills, recipes, and more, as well as her colorful vocabulary and (apparent) short temper. In a series of early videos, with titles like "Sink Chicken", "Ghetto Caviar", and "How to feed Seven people with just $3.35", O'Dell quickly became known for making tasty, easy recipes, often out of minimal ingredients. She was also known for promoting different ideas for saving money when grocery shopping. One of her most famous quotes was when she was defending her use of sugar, butter, and cheese, saying it was "for the kids". When Tavis asked why "so much cheese" was required for a particular recipe, she responded with: "Because. Who likes cheese? Kids and fat people." Auntie Fee had more than 330,000 followers on her Facebook page.

O'Dell also filmed promotional cooking videos for the movies Dumb and Dumber To and Top Five. In the former, she prepared a macaroni and cheese recipe called "Dumb Good Mac & Cheese". When asked what the word "dumb" meant in cooking, she compared it to how men used to speak "back in the day", by saying something is "so good" that it becomes "stupid", like "That woman is 'stupid' fine!". Among notable individuals who appeared with O'Dell included actress Sherri Shepherd, TMZ founder Harvey Levin, and fellow Los Angeles native, Snoop Dogg. Auntie Fee later appeared in various interviews and segments on television, notably appearing several times on Jimmy Kimmel Live!, The Steve Harvey Show and TMZ on TV.

Auntie Fee started a cooking supply and merchandise shop online, selling branded items via her website, such as dry seasoning, recipe books, aprons, and various ingredients and items for the kitchen. She uploaded more than 50 videos to her YouTube channel, Cooking With Auntie Fee. She also had appearances on the television show Real Husbands of Hollywood and the movie Barbershop 3.

== Death ==
O'Dell reportedly experienced chest pains while at her home on March 14, 2017, resulting in a 9-1-1 emergency response call. After arriving at the hospital, her son recorded her last moments on camera. While undergoing emergency surgery at Harbor-UCLA Medical Center, O'Dell suffered a massive heart attack and was eventually placed on life support. Her son Tavis commented on her death, telling E! News in 2017:

"Thank you for all the prayers and hope, It did all it can do and now God made the decision to take my mother home where its peace & Joy and im okay with that. She can finally Be happy, Rip Momma Felicia Auntie Fee O'Dell i love you and you was my twin, When u was going through it i went through it, and now its time for you to relax and watch me do it baby."

— Tavis Hunter, son of Auntie Fee

Her brother, Jude O'Dell, stated that his sister died at the hospital on March 18, 2017. She was 59 years old. Her funeral, which was live streamed on Facebook, and open to the public, was held on April 1, 2017, at Paradise Baptist Church in South Los Angeles.

== Filmography ==
Auntie Fee's filmography references:

=== Actress ===
- 2015: Last Call
- 2016: Bank
- 2016: Barbershop: The Next Cut
- 2017: The Fighters Prayer
- 2017: Hogan

== See also ==
- List of YouTubers
