= Code Name: The Cleaner =

2007 American film directed by Les Mayfield

- Theatrical release poster
- Directed by: Les Mayfield
- Written by: Robert Adetuyi; George Gallo
- Produced by: Cedric the Entertainer; Brett Ratner; Eric Rhone; Jay Stern
- Starring: Cedric the Entertainer; Lucy Liu; Nicollette Sheridan; DeRay Davis; Tom Butler; Mark Dacascos
- Cinematography: David Franco
- Edited by: Michael Matzdorff
- Music by: George S. Clinton
- Production companies: FilmEngine; Rat Entertainment; Bird and a Bear Entertainment; Cleaner Films
- Distributed by: New Line Cinema
- Release date: January 5, 2007
- Running time: 84 minutes
- Country: United States
- Language: English
- Budget: $20 million
- Box office: $10.3 million

Code Name: The Cleaner is a 2007 American action comedy film directed by Les Mayfield and starring Cedric the Entertainer, Lucy Liu, Callum Keith Rennie, Nicollette Sheridan and Mark Dacascos. The film was released by New Line Cinema on January 5, 2007. Upon its release, the film was panned by critics and was a box-office bomb.

== Plot ==
Jake wakes up in a hotel room next to a dead body along with a suitcase full of money. He has a bruise on his head and can't remember anything. He leaves the hotel with the suitcase and sees a lady (Diane) downstairs who drives him out of the hotel. FBI agents arrive there and try to reconstruct the events.

Diane claims to be his wife and takes him to a large mansion insisting it's his home. But he grows suspicious since he's not on any of the photographs there. Diane seduces him asking about a computer chip at the hotel. He vaguely recalls using guns and being a part of a combat operation. A doctor examines Jake and suggests injecting him with Sodium Pentothal, which he overhears and drives out of the home taking the suitcase with him.

While having lunch at a restaurant, Jake sees a waitress Gina who asks why he hasn't called. He asks if he's a secret agent and she says he's a janitor at a Digital Arts video game company (DART) across the street.

Diane tells Hauck, the head of DART, that Jake is a janitor who breached their security and escaped with a computer chip that's company property. Hauck says they only have a few days to recover the stolen chip.

Gina takes Jake to her place and shows him video games and a janitor uniform. She says he told her about something important going on at work. Jake tells her he remembers being a Colonel Bowman of the Special Forces. Riley calls and tells Jake to come to the airport. When Jake arrives there, Riley questions him about the location of the X-1 computer chip, and says he mentioned Boca Raton. Suddenly, FBI agent Shaw and others arrive at the scene and start shooting at them, capturing Jake and driving away with Gina following.

Shaw sticks some Sodium Pentothal into Jake while Diane questions him about the whereabouts of the hidden chip. He convulses and then escapes with Gina in her car. Gina confesses that she is also a Federal agent and calls her superior Martin who asks her to turn herself in as Shaw has implicated her as a rogue agent. Gina refuses and says she will get back to Martin with evidence against Shaw.

Jake and Gina go to a video game store where Colonel Bowman happens to be a character in his favorite video game. They understand that the X-1 chip of the DART company can transfer information undetected and is worth a lot on the Black market. Jake tells Gina that "Boca Raton" means "mouth of the rat" and that he knows where the chip is. Gina and Jake enter building with a gun and discover the chip in the mouth of a rat in a video game room. FBI agents arrive and start shooting at them. Jake then remembers everything - two FBI agents offered him a suitcase with money in return for the computer chip, and when he refused to do so, a struggle ensued and an agent was shot. Gina and Jake overpower the FBI agents and Hauck using janitorial tools. Jake recollects that he really is a janitor after all.

Martin finally thanks Jake and offers him a chance on the FBI training program, but Jake chooses to become a video game developer to work under Riley. Gina suggests getting closer to Jake, who grabs the suitcase of money as they head out.

== Cast ==
- Cedric the Entertainer as Jake Rogers
- Lucy Liu as Gina
- Nicollette Sheridan as Diane
- Mark Dacascos as Eric Hauck
- Callum Keith Rennie as Richard Shaw
- Niecy Nash as Jacuzzi
- DeRay Davis as Ronnie
- Will Patton as Riley
- Kevin McNulty as Dr. Soames
- Beau Davis as Old Timer
- Bart Anderson as Charlie
- Tom Butler as Martin Crane
- Robert Clarke as The Butler

== Reception ==
The film was panned by critics. On the review aggregator website Rotten Tomatoes, 4% of 81 critics' reviews are positive. The website's consensus reads: "Code Name: The Cleaner is a limp action/comedy flick that alternates between lame, worn-out jokes and cheesy martial arts." Metacritic, which uses a weighted average, assigned the film a score of 33 out of 100, based on 18 critics, indicating "generally unfavorable" reviews. Audiences polled by CinemaScore gave the film an average grade of "B" on an A+ to F scale.

The film grossed $10.3 million worldwide against a $20 million production budget.

The film received a Razzie nomination for Worst Supporting Actress (Nicollette Sheridan).

== Home media ==
Code Name: The Cleaner was released on April 24, 2007 and sold 224,724 units translating to revenue of $4,492,233.

== See also ==
- Mord ist mein Geschäft, Liebling (2009)
