= Lake City (film) =

- Directed by: Perry Moore; Hunter Hill
- Written by: Perry Moore; Hunter Hill
- Produced by: Donna Bascom; Mike Ryan; Allison Sarofim
- Starring: Sissy Spacek; Troy Garity; Keith Carradine; Rebecca Romijn; Dave Matthews; Drea de Matteo
- Cinematography: Robert Gantz
- Edited by: Jeffrey Wolf
- Music by: Aaron Zigman
- Distributed by: Screen Media Films
- Release date: November 21, 2008
- Running time: 92 minutes
- Country: United States
- Language: English
- Box office: US$12,686 (U.S.)

Lake City is a 2008 American drama film directed by Perry Moore and Hunter Hill and starring Sissy Spacek, Troy Garity and Dave Matthews.

== Plot ==
A mother reunites with her son after many years, who had left home as a result of a searing family tragedy.

== Cast ==
- Sissy Spacek as Maggie
- Jason Davis as Shawn
- Troy Garity as Billy
- Dave Matthews as "Red" (credited as David Matthews)
- Rebecca Romijn as Jenny
- Keith Carradine as Royce "Roy"
- Drea de Matteo as Hope
- Jeff Wincott as Leo
- Colin Ford as Clayton

== Production ==
Lake City was shot in Virginia on a $4 million budget.

== Release ==
Lake City had its world premiere at the 2008 Tribeca Film Festival on April 25, 2008, and was released in a single theater on November 21, 2008.

Following the release, Screen Media Films acquired the rights to release the film on DVD.

== Reception ==
On review aggregator website Rotten Tomatoes, the film has an approval rating of 12% based on reviews from 26 critics, with an average rating of 3.6/10. The site's critics consensus states: "Lake City fails to make use of its accomplished cast, with the story unraveling amid the competing visions of its dual directors". On Metacritic, the film has a score of 29 out of a 100 based on 12 critics, indicating "generally unfavorable" reviews.

Bill White of the Seattle Post-Intelligencer wrote: "When Hill and Moore leave story and characters behind to veer off into suspenseless chases through cornfields, one wonders if the era of earnest American drama may be coming to a close".

Josh Rosenblatt of The Austin Chronicle said "The only thing saving Lake City from total ridiculousness is [Sissy] Spacek".

Stephen Holden reviewing for The New York Times had criticized the lead actress, writing "When Sissy Spacek speaks her cliched lines in the mediocre screenplay of [the film], her delivery lends them a resonance that is not in the written words".

According to Mick LaSalle of the San Francisco Chronicle "With all the high-profile movies blasting into theaters at this time of year, Lake City will probably get lost in the shuffle. That won't be a tragedy".

Robert Koehler of The Christian Science Monitor wrote "The astonishingly inept finish could serve as a primer in screenwriting classes on how not to wind up a family drama".

Lisa Schwarzbaum of Entertainment Weekly said that "The story is as impersonal as it is labored", while Michelle Orange of The Village Voice wrote "Add[ing] to the general torpidity and twangy tropes of this Southern family drama is the discomfort of watching a natural actor force it".
