= Deep in the Darkness =

2004 novel by Michael Laimo

Deep in the Darkness is the name of a 2004 novel by American writer Michael Laimo and a film adaptation by the same name. The novel was nominated for a 2004 Bram Stoker Award for Novel. While writing the book Laimo was influenced by the 1973 made-for-television film Don't Be Afraid of the Dark. Laimo wrote a sequel to Deep in the Darkness entitled Return to Darkness, which he released in 2011.

== Plot summary ==
After the death of her doctor husband Neil, Mrs. Ferris sells her home and the Ashborough medical practice to Dr. Michael Cayle. At his wife Christine's insistence, Michael moves Christine and their young daughter Jessica from New York to the small town of Ashborough, New Hampshire for a quieter life.

New neighbor Phil Dreighton introduces the Cayles to his grandson Tyler and invites the family to his house for lunch. While using the Dreightons' bathroom, Michael meets Phil's wife Rosy, who has a severely scarred face. Later, Michael and Christine agree that the timing is right to have another child.

A package is delivered for the deceased Dr. Ferris. Michael opens it and discovers virus samples ranging from Ebola to the bubonic plague. Michael begins meeting various townspeople as his new patients. Lauren Hunter is strangely flirtatious.

Phil goes hiking with Michael and shows him a stone altar in the forest covered with blood. Phil explains that centuries ago, a breed of wild men known as Isolates populated the area. People make sacrifices to the Isolates to keep their families safe from their savagery. Phil tells Michael that he is expected to make a blood sacrifice on the altar and that it was Phil's duty to explain the tradition to Michael just as it was explained to Phil by Lady Zellis when the Dreightons first moved to Ashborough. Michael assumes the idea is crazy.

Michael takes Christine and Jessica to a church service to meet the rest of the townspeople. Rosy Dreighton pretends she is meeting Michael for the first time. After the service, Michael observes as his wife is suspiciously spirited away by Lady Zellis. Tyler starts to warn Michael about Lady Zellis before being stopped by Sheriff Andy Godbout's son AJ. Michael looks for Christine inside the church and Lauren Hunter tries seducing him again. When he spurns her, Lauren cryptically infers that Michael is the only one who can protect her, although she does not specify from what.

Christine tells Michael that she is pregnant, but that in lieu of an OB/GYN, she wants to see the town's midwife Lady Zellis. Christine begins acting as if she is hiding something from Michael. Michael starts to see signs of an intruder throughout the house and begins having nightmares. Michael hears noises outside and kills a goat that startles him. However, when he goes back to clean up the carcass, the goat is gone.

While Michael is home alone, Lauren shows up covered in blood with her stomach torn open. Michael futilely tries calling for an ambulance only to discover Lauren's body missing when he returns outside. Sheriff Godbout does not take Michael's claim of Lauren's murder seriously. Michael tries driving out of town, but his car will not start. Lauren is then found on the road, her death made to look like an accident.

Michael finds more signs of someone or something stalking his family inside their home. Lady Zellis pays Michael a visit. She cryptically tells him that "they" will be coming for him so that he may deliver a child and if he were not needed, he would already be dead because he did not complete the sacrifice. Michael's home office is then invaded by feral Isolates, who drag him to their caverns where he is forced to deliver the child of a pregnant savage.

Michael visits Phil for answers. Phil says they cannot talk because the Isolates can hear them and that no one will help because fear of the tribe runs so deep. Phil also reveals that the Isolates took his wife Rosy, and left her eyeballs on his nightstand.

Michael begs his wife to tell him what she knows. Christine says she cannot reveal anything for their own safety and infers that Michael should sacrifice their family dog on the woodland altar. Michael attempts to do so, but Jessica interrupts him.

The next day, Michael boards up the windows on his house, although Tyler warns Michael that it won't keep the Isolates out if they want to find a way in. Later, the Isolates abduct Michael again and force him to kill Phil in the caves.

Tyler confronts Michael about his father's death and asks for help killing the Isolates. Michael tells Tyler to seek help elsewhere. Tyler tells him that Lady Zellis runs the town and keeps the residents in line with the tea that everyone is forced to drink. Knowing that the Isolates listen to their words, Michael passes Tyler a note about arranging an escape plan.

Michael packs the family's bags and flees in his minivan with Christine and Jessica. Sheriff Godbout tries stopping them, but Christine runs him over. The Cayles are drawn back to town by Tyler's screams. Michael finds Lady Zellis cutting Tyler's chest while he is tied to a chair and Michael threatens her with a blade to escape with Tyler. Everyone flees in the minivan, but Christine crashes into a fallen tree, forcing everyone to retreat to the Cayle home.

The Isolates attack and kill Tyler. While Michael attends to Christine's injuries, Jessica is abducted. Michael arms himself with a syringe of bubonic plague that he uses to infect the Isolates on his next trip underground. The Isolates die and Michael rescues Jessica. When Michael returns home, he finds Lady Zellis delivering Christine's baby while surrounded by a handful of townspeople. Christine apologizes to Michael for deceiving him as she gives birth to an Isolate. Later, Michael finds an old photograph of Christine as a child and realizes that she is standing in front of a mailbox labeled "Zellis."

== Film adaptation ==
Chiller officially announced plans to film an adaptation of Deep in the Darkness in mid 2013 and also announced that the movie would have a limited theatrical release before it went to VOD. The film starred Sean Patrick Thomas as Dr. Michael Cayle and Dean Stockwell as Phil Deighton, and featured a score by Matthew Llewellyn. The film officially released on April 29, 2014. Shock Till You Drop gave the movie a score of five out of ten, stating that while it had some effective jump scares and a good cast, they felt that the film was mostly unmemorable. The New York Times panned the film, expressing disappointment that the film did not live up to its full potential. Shout Factory released the film on April 21, 2015 on DVD and Blu-ray Disc in the United States.
