= Barbershop (film) =

2002 American film by Tim Story

- Theatrical poster
- Directed by: Tim Story
- Screenplay by: Mark Brown; Don D. Scott; Marshall Todd
- Story by: Mark Brown
- Produced by: George Tillman Jr.; Robert Teitel; Mark Brown
- Starring: Ice Cube; Anthony Anderson; Sean Patrick Thomas; Eve; Troy Garity; Michael Ealy; Leonard Earl Howze; Keith David; Cedric the Entertainer
- Cinematography: Tom Priestley Jr.
- Edited by: John Carter
- Music by: Terence Blanchard
- Production companies: Metro-Goldwyn-Mayer; Cube Vision; State Street Pictures
- Distributed by: MGM Distribution Co. (United States and Canada); 20th Century Fox (International)
- Release date: September 13, 2002
- Running time: 102 minutes
- Country: United States
- Language: English
- Budget: $12 million
- Box office: $77 million

Barbershop is a 2002 American comedy-drama film and the first installment in the Barbershop series directed by Tim Story and written by Mark Brown, Don D. Scott and Marshall Todd, from a story by Brown. It was produced by George Tillman Jr., Robert Teitel and Brown. The film stars Ice Cube, Anthony Anderson, Sean Patrick Thomas, Eve, Troy Garity, Michael Ealy, Leonard Earl Howze, Keith David and Cedric the Entertainer. Its plot revolves around the social life in a barbershop on the South Side of Chicago.

The film was released on September 13, 2002, by MGM Distribution Co. under the Metro-Goldwyn-Mayer label. It received positive reviews from critics and grossed $77 million worldwide.

A sequel, Barbershop 2: Back in Business, was released on February 6, 2004, with the original cast returning without director Story, and a third installment, Barbershop: The Next Cut, was released on April 15, 2016, and was directed by Malcolm D. Lee.

== Plot ==
On a cold winter day in Chicago, Calvin Palmer Jr. decides he has had enough of trying to keep open the barbershop his father handed down to him. He cannot borrow, revenues are falling, and he seems more interested in get-rich-quick schemes to bring in easy money. Without telling his employees or the customers, he sells the barbershop to a greedy loan shark, Lester Wallace, who secretly plans to turn it into a strip club.

After spending a day at work, and realizing just how vital the barbershop is to the surrounding community, Calvin rethinks his decision and tries to get the shop back - only to find out Lester wants double the $20,000 he paid Calvin to return it, and before 7 pm that day. Right after he admits to the employees that he sold the barber shop, and that it would be closing at the end of the day, the police arrive to arrest one of the barbers, Ricky.

Ricky is accused of driving his pickup truck into a nearby market to steal an ATM, but it's revealed that his cousin J.D. committed the crime after borrowing Ricky's truck. As this would be Ricky's 'third strike', he could be sentenced to life in prison. Calvin uses the $20,000 from Lester to bail Ricky out of jail, but because J.D. was going to let Ricky take the fall without remorse, Ricky is still angry.

Calvin reveals that he found a gun in Ricky's locker in the barbershop and shows it to him. They stop the car and Ricky throws the gun into the Chicago River, proving that he does not want to get into any more trouble. Then they both go to confront Lester, as well as J.D. and Billy, who took the ATM to Lester's place without his knowledge, still trying to pry it open. Calvin and Ricky demand that Lester give the barbershop back.

Angered, Lester orders his bodyguard Monk to pull out his gun. The police arrive just in time to save Calvin and Ricky and arrest J.D. and Billy. Calvin and Ricky see the ATM, and get a $50,000 reward for returning it to police. They get the money, and the barbershop reopens with even better business than before. In the meantime, Calvin's wife Jennifer has given birth to a baby boy.

== Cast ==
- Ice Cube as Calvin Palmer Jr.
- Anthony Anderson as J.D.
- Sean Patrick Thomas as Jimmy James
- Eve as Terri Jones
- Cedric the Entertainer as Eddie Walker
- Troy Garity as Isaac Rosenberg
- Michael Ealy as Ricky Nash
- Leonard Earl Howze as Dinka
- Keith David as Lester Wallace
- Lahmard Tate as Billy
- Jazsmin Lewis as Jennifer Palmer
- Tom Wright as Detective Williams
- Jason George as Kevin
- DeRay Davis as Ray Ray
- Sonya Eddy as Janelle
- Parvesh Cheena as Samir
- Carl Wright as Checker Fred
- Kevyn Morrow as Monk
- Norm Van Lier as Sam
- Jalen Rose as himself
- Lorenzo Clemons as Bank Manager
- Deon Cole as Darrel
- Eric Lane as Rodney
- Janina Gavankar as Fine Woman
- Marcia Wright-Tillman as Angry woman who smashes car with bat

== Production ==
Barbershop was produced on a $12 million budget. The story was written by Mark Brown with screenplay by Brown, Marshall Todd, and Don D. Scott. It was filmed in Chicago during the winter of 2001-02; production commenced in January.

The filmmakers used a storefront in the South Chicago community area (79th Street and Exchange Avenue) to build the set for Calvin's barbershop. Producer Robert Teitel recalled that, during the first day of location scouting, the production came across three abandoned storefronts at the intersection and decided that the location was a natural fit for the film.

Similar to what he achieved with his 1997 film Soul Food, producer George Tillman Jr. wanted to portray African Americans in a more positive and three-dimensional light than many other Hollywood films had in the past. Producers Tillman and Robert Teitel picked Story to direct due to his preparedness. This film also features three original songs by R&B singer/songwriter Sherod Lindsey.

Days after the release of the film, Rev. Al Sharpton and the Rev. Jesse Jackson expressed public umbrage over comments made in the film about Rosa Parks and Martin Luther King Jr., with the former advocating for a boycott and the latter wishing for the dialogue to be excised from future editions. Neither of these requests would occur.

== Reception ==
On the review aggregator website Rotten Tomatoes, 82% of 125 critics' reviews are positive, with an average rating of 6.6/10. The website's consensus reads: "Besides bringing on the laughs, Barbershop displays a big heart and demonstrates the value of community." Metacritic gives the film a weighted average score of 66 out of 100 based on 29 critics, indicating "generally favorable" reviews. Audiences surveyed by CinemaScore gave the film an average grade "A−" on an A+ to F scale.

Roger Ebert gave the film 3/4 stars, saying that it is "ungainly in construction but graceful in delivery". Frank Scheck from The Hollywood Reporter praised genuine nature of the characters but critiqued its use of cliches. A. O. Scott of The New York Times also critiqued the film's use of cliche characters but noted that the sense of familiarity present in those cliches was a part of the film's charm.

The jokes of the character Eddie Walker (Cedric the Entertainer) about Martin Luther King Jr. and Rosa Parks (the pastor's promiscuity with women, and "Rosa Parks ain't do nothin' but sit ... down.") were criticized for defaming popular Black figures. Rev. Jesse Jackson publicly asked for those jokes to be edited out of the movie on the DVD and VHS releases.

== Sequels, spin-off and television series ==
In 2004, MGM released the sequel, Barbershop 2: Back in Business. Much of the original cast returned, but director Tim Story did not; Kevin Rodney Sullivan directed the sequel. In the same year, Billie Woodruff directed a spin-off film entitled Beauty Shop, with Queen Latifah as the lead (Latifah's character made her debut in Barbershop 2). Beauty Shop was reached in theaters in March 2005.

In August 2005, State Street and Ice Cube debuted Barbershop: The Series on the Showtime cable network, with Omar Gooding taking over Ice Cube's role of Calvin. The character "Dinka" is renamed "Yinka" on Barbershop: The Series, as "Dinka" is not a typical Nigerian name. In addition, Isaac's last name is changed from "Rosenberg" to "Brice", and the character Ricky has been replaced by a more hardened ex-con, Romadal.

In 2014, a third Barbershop film was announced, titled Barbershop: The Next Cut. In late March of that year, MGM executives revealed that they have been negotiating deals with Ice Cube to appear in the film. A year later, MGM announced that the studio has been setting up deals with Cedric the Entertainer, Queen Latifah, Lisa Maffia, and Nicki Minaj to appear in the film. Malcolm D. Lee directed the film and New Line Cinema distributed it. The film was released on April 15, 2016.

== Soundtrack ==
A soundtrack containing hip hop and R&B music was released on August 27, 2002, by Epic Records. It peaked at #29 on the Billboard 200 and #9 on the Top R&B/Hip-Hop Albums.

== See also ==
- List of hood films
