= Cube Vision =

American film and TV production company

- Industry: Entertainment
- Founded: 1995
- Founders: Ice Cube; Matt Alvarez
- Headquarters: Santa Monica, California, U.S.
- Key people: Ice Cube; Matt Alvarez
- Products: Motion pictures; television programs
- Website: Official YouTube channel

Cube Vision, Inc. (sometimes stylized as CubeVision or Cubevision) is an American film and television production company founded by Ice Cube in 1995. Their logo consists of the earth shaped as a cube.

== History ==
Ice Cube started his movie producing career in 1995 with his then manager Patricia Charbonnet. Together, they produced Friday (1995), Dangerous Ground (1997) and The Players Club (1998). Cube, along with new producing partner Matt Alvarez, founded CubeVision (later credited in films as Cube Vision) in 1998. The company's first film would be 2000's Next Friday, a sequel to Ice Cube's 1995 film Friday. Cube Vision went on to produce All About the Benjamins, Barbershop and Friday After Next, the third film in the Friday film series, in 2002.

In February 2003, Ice Cube signed a deal to star and produce three pictures with Revolution Studios. In an interview, Cube said of the deal, "I believe that a lot of good things are going to happen out of this relationship for both (Revolution and Cube Vision)." The films to come from the Revolution Studios partnership would be April 2005's XXX: State of the Union, which Cube only starred in, and Are We There Yet? in January 2005 and Are We Done Yet? in April 2007, which Cube starred in and produced for Cube Vision.

In 2016, Cube Vision signed a deal with 20th Century Fox, covering development of shows for all outlets, and giving access to Cube's music library.

== Filmography ==
=== Films ===
==== 1990s (as Ice Cube Productions) ====
Year	Title	Director	Distributor	Notes
1995	Friday	F. Gary Gray	New Line Cinema	
1997	Dangerous Ground	Darrell Roodt	New Line Cinema	
1998	The Players Club	Ice Cube	New Line Cinema	

==== 2000s (as Cube Vision) ====
Year	Title	Director	Distributor	Notes
2000	Next Friday	Steve Carr	New Line Cinema	
2002	All About the Benjamins	Kevin Bray	New Line Cinema	
2002	Barbershop	Tim Story	MGM Distribution Co.	co-production with State Street Pictures and Metro-Goldwyn-Mayer
2002	Friday After Next	Marcus Raboy	New Line Cinema	
2004	Barbershop 2: Back in Business	Kevin Rodney Sullivan	MGM Distribution Co.	executive producer; co-production with State Street Pictures and Metro-Goldwyn-Mayer
2005	Are We There Yet?	Brian Levant	Sony Pictures Releasing	co-production with Columbia Pictures and Revolution Studios
2005	Beauty Shop	Bille Woodruff	MGM Distribution Co.	executive producer; co-production with Metro-Goldwyn-Mayer, State Street Pictures and Mandeville Films
2007	Are We Done Yet?	Steve Carr	Sony Pictures Releasing	co-production with Columbia Pictures, Revolution Studios and RKO Pictures
2008	First Sunday	David E. Talbert	Sony Pictures Releasing	co-production with Screen Gems, Firm Film and The Story Company
2008	The Longshots	Fred Durst	MGM Distribution Co.	co-production with Metro-Goldwyn-Mayer and Dimension Films
2009	Janky Promoters	Marcus Raboy	Third Rail Releasing	co-production with Dimension Films

==== 2010s ====
Year	Title	Director	Distributor	Notes
2010	Lottery Ticket	Erik White	Warner Bros. Pictures	co-production with Alcon Entertainment, Burg/Koules Productions and Sweepstake Productions
2014	Ride Along	Tim Story	Universal Pictures	co-production with Relativity Media and Rainforest Films
2015	Straight Outta Compton	F. Gary Gray	Universal Pictures	co-production with Legendary Pictures, New Line Cinema, Crucial Films and Broken Chair Flickz
2016	Ride Along 2	Tim Story	Universal Pictures	co-production with Will Packer Productions
2016	Barbershop: The Next Cut	Malcolm D. Lee	Warner Bros. Pictures	co-production with New Line Cinema, Metro-Goldwyn-Mayer and State Street Pictures

==== Upcoming ====
Year	Title	Director	Distributor	Notes
2026	Dock	TBA	TBA	co-production with AID Partners
TBA	Last Friday	TBA	TBA	
2026	Oliver Twist	TBA	Walt Disney Studios Motion Pictures	co-production with The Firm and Walt Disney Pictures
TBA	Outside Man	Brian Helgeland	Focus Features	co-production with Teton Ridge Entertainment
TBA	Ride Along 3	Tim Story	Universal Pictures	co-production with Hartbeat Productions and The Story Company

=== Television ===
==== 2000s ====
Year	Title	Creator	Network	Notes
2005	BarberShop: The Series	based on characters created by: Mark Brown developed by: John Ridley	Showtime	executive producer; co-production with State Street Pictures, International Famous Players Radio Corporation and MGM Television
2006	Black. White.	Ice Cube; R.J. Cutler	FX	executive producer; co-production with Actual Reality Pictures
2007	Friday: The Animated Series	Ice Cube developed by: Jay Dyer	MTV2	executive producer; co-production with New Line Television and MTV Animation

==== 2010s ====
Year	Title	Creator	Network	Notes
2010-2013	Are We There Yet?	Ice Cube; Ali LeRoi based on characters created by: Steven Gary Banks; Claudia Grazioso developed by: Ali LeRoi	TBS	executive producer; co-production with Revolution Studios, 5914 Productions Ltd. and Debmar-Mercury
2017-2019	Hip Hop Squares	based on Hollywood Squares by: Merrill Heatter; Bob Quigley	VH1	revival of 2012 series on MTV2; executive producer; co-production with Jesse Collins Entertainment, Entertain the Brutes, The Firm and CBS Television Distribution

==== Television movies ====
Year	Title	Director	Network	Notes
2010	Straight Outta L.A.	Ice Cube	ESPN	executive producer; part of ESPN Films' 30 for 30 series, co-production with ESPN Films
