= Carl Wright (actor) =

American actor

- Born: February 2, 1932; Orlando, Florida, U.S.
- Died: May 19, 2007 (aged 75); Chicago, Illinois, U.S.
- Occupations: Tap dancer, actor, comedian
- Years active: 1954–2007

Carl Wright (February 2, 1932 – May 19, 2007) was an American tap dancer, actor, and comedian whose later life acting credits included Soul Food, Barbershop, and Big Momma's House. For several years, Wright teamed with Chicago radio legend Pervis Spann, playing a misguided and mischievous reverend on his Chicago television show "Blues and More".

Born in Orlando, Florida, he toured as a tap dancer as a young man, and for a time performed as The Three-Leggers with a one-legged partner. Wright died of cancer at his home in Chicago in 2007.

== Filmography ==
Year	Title	Role	Notes
1997	Soul Food	Reverend Williams	
1998	Early Edition	Henderson	Episode: "Walk, Don't Run"
2000	Big Momma's House	Ben Rawley	
2001	Just Visiting	Station Master	
2002	Barbershop	Checker Fred	
2003	Platinum Playaz	Mr. Green	
2003	When Thugs Cry	Minister	
2004	Barbershop 2: Back in Business	Checker Fred	
2004	The Cookout	Grandpa	Final film role
