= Beauty Shop =

2005 American comedy film by Bille Woodruff

- Theatrical release poster
- Directed by: Bille Woodruff
- Screenplay by: Kate Lanier; Norman Vance Jr.
- Story by: Elizabeth Hunter
- Produced by: David Hoberman; Robert Teitel; George Tillman Jr.; Queen Latifah; Shakim Compere
- Starring: Queen Latifah; Alicia Silverstone; Andie MacDowell; Alfre Woodard; Mena Suvari; Kevin Bacon; Djimon Hounsou
- Cinematography: Theo van de Sande
- Edited by: Michael Jablow
- Music by: Christopher Young
- Production companies: Metro-Goldwyn-Mayer; State Street Pictures; Mandeville Films; Flavor Unit Entertainment
- Distributed by: MGM Distribution Co. (United States); 20th Century Fox (International)
- Release date: March 30, 2005
- Running time: 105 minutes
- Country: United States
- Language: English
- Budget: $25 million
- Box office: $37.2 million

Beauty Shop is a 2005 American comedy film directed by Bille Woodruff. The film serves as a spin-off of the Barbershop film series, and stars Queen Latifah as Gina Norris, a character first introduced in the 2004 film Barbershop 2: Back in Business. This film also stars Alicia Silverstone, Andie MacDowell, Mena Suvari, Kevin Bacon and Djimon Hounsou.

Released theatrically in the United States by MGM Distribution Co. under the Metro-Goldwyn-Mayer Pictures label on March 30, 2005, Beauty Shop received generally mixed reviews from critics. The film grossed $37.2 million worldwide against a $25 million production budget.

== Plot ==
Widowed hairstylist Gina Norris has moved to Atlanta so her daughter Vanessa can attend a private music school. After a disagreement with her domineering Austrian boss Jorge, she quits and sets up her own shop, purchasing a run-down salon with the help of a loan officer. The shop is old-fashioned and needs a lot of work, so Gina hires an electrician named Joe to help bring it up to code. At the shop, the staff often listen to their favorite radio talk-show host, DJ Hollerin' Helen.

Gina discovers that taking over the salon comes with complications: loudmouthed young stylists, demanding clients, and her own lack of an established reputation in Atlanta. Lynn, the only white stylist at the salon, has trouble fitting in, especially with Chanel, another stylist. A flirtatious teenage boy, Willie, hangs around filming things and chatting up the women at the salon, including Vanessa. When Gina's rebellious sister-in-law Darnelle gets into legal trouble with her abusive boyfriend, Gina has to bail her out of jail. She has Darnelle work at the shop to pay her back, and gives Darnelle an ultimatum to clean up her act and pay back Gina's money or face eviction.

Gina's styling skills and customer handling win over the salon's clientele, and many customers from Jorge's salon begin going to hers instead. Meanwhile, a safety inspector threatens to shut down Gina's salon with spurious violations. When electrical issues arise, Gina finds that the upstairs renter, Joe, is a handsome electrician from Africa. He bonds with Vanessa over their love of piano, and he and Gina also become close.

Gina develops a homemade "miracle" hair conditioner. A satisfied client, Joanne, arranges for a meeting at cosmetics company CoverGirl so that Gina can sell them the formula. She hires a male stylist, James, after he comes into the shop and demonstrates his skill with braids. Darnelle's boyfriend confronts her at the salon, and Gina and James step in to protect her.

The salon staff go to a nightclub to party. James and Lynn fall for one another after dancing and kissing. Gina and Joe develop their relationship as well. At the salon, when Joanne flirts with James, Lynn politely asks her to leave James alone as she and him are slowly developing and building their relationship. Joanne becomes arrogant and belligerent with Lynn and Chanel. Chanel, who used to dislike Lynn, unexpectedly stands up for Lynn, and this causes a heated argument between Lynn, Chanel, and Joanne. Gina comes in to stop the argument and Joanne angrily demands that Gina fire them. Gina refuses and Joanne cancels the meeting with CoverGirl. Joanne also angrily mentions that she is done being Gina's client and storms out of the salon out of pettiness. Feeling guilty, Lynn apologizes, but Gina tells them that it is not her fault, it just was not meant to be between her and Joanne.

The shop is trashed and vandalized the night before Vanessa's big piano recital, but the staff come together to clean up the mess, even bringing in their own supplies to ensure the salon can stay open. Darnelle decides it is time for her to grow up and enrolls in beauty school. Willie secretly tapes Jorge and Inspector Crawford discussing their scheme to ruin Gina.

A disheveled woman enters the shop and begs someone to fix her hair for a wedding that day. Willie shows Gina the videotape of Jorge and Inspector Crawford. That night, Gina confronts Jorge at his salon and threatens to expose his scheme, as well as the fact that he is actually from Nebraska, not Austria, and tells him she will never give up. Jorge continues to insult Gina as she leaves, and James and his friends humiliate him by giving him an extreme haircut as payback.

Later, as Gina and the shop listen to Hollerin' Helen's show, she gives a shout-out to Gina's salon and her miracle conditioner, and they realize she was the desperate woman on the way to the wedding.

== Cast ==
- Queen Latifah as Gina Norris
- Alicia Silverstone as Lynn
- Andie MacDowell as Terri
- Alfre Woodard as Ms. Josephine
- Mena Suvari as Joanne Marcus
- Kevin Bacon as Jorge Christophe (real name: George Christie)
- Djimon Hounsou as Joe Johnson
- Della Reese as Mrs. Towner
- Golden Brooks as Chanel
- Miss Laura Hayes as Paulette Norris (Gina's mother-in-law)
- Paige Hurd as Vanessa Norris (Gina's daughter, Paulette's granddaughter)
- L'il JJ as Willie
- LisaRaye McCoy as Rochelle
- Keshia Knight Pulliam as Darnelle Norris (Paulette's daughter, Gina's sister-in-law, Vanessa's aunt)
- Sherri Shepherd as Ida
- Kimora Lee Simmons as Denise
- Sheryl Underwood as Rita "Catfish Rita"
- Bryce Wilson as James
- Omari Hardwick as Byron
- Adele Givens as Helen "Hollerin' Helen"
- Jim Holmes as Inspector Crawford
- Joyful Drake as Mercedes
- Tawny Dahl as Porsche
- Andrew Levitas as Stacy
- Octavia Spencer as Client
- Birdman as Glen
- Wilmer Valderrama as Corky / Stacy
- Reagan Gomez-Preston as Chelsea
- Ki Toy Johnson as Debbie
- Nancy Lenehan as Mrs. Struggs

== Reception ==
On Rotten Tomatoes, the film holds an approval rating of 38%, based on reviews from 119 critics, with an average score of 5.35/10. The site's critics consensus reads: "Despite a strong performance by Queen Latifah, Beauty Shop is in need of some style pointers." On Metacritic, the film has a weighted average score of 53 rating, based on 28 critics, indicating "mixed or average" reviews. Audiences surveyed by CinemaScore gave the film a grade A− on scale of A to F.

Claudia Puig of USA Today wrote "Overall, the parts don't come together and jell as well as they did in the Barbershop films".

Jennifer Frey of The Washington Post praised lead actress, Queen Latifah, for being herself.

Ruthe Stein of the San Francisco Chronicle said that "[actress] Alfre Woodard shows she's as adept at comedy as drama".

Derek Armstrong of AllMovie gave the film three out of five stars, stating that while the film sticks to the same formula which made the Barbershop films so successful, it still "bursts with life, having attracted a spectrum of enthusiastic performers and a script that exceeds broad character types."

== Awards and nominations ==
Award	Date of ceremony	Category	Recipients	Result	Ref.
Teen Choice Awards	August 16, 2005	Choice Comedy Movie Actress	Queen Latifah	Nominated	
Teen Choice Awards	August 16, 2005	Choice Sleazebag	Kevin Bacon	Nominated	
Teen Choice Awards	August 16, 2005	Choice Rap Artist	Queen Latifah	Nominated	
Teen Choice Awards	August 16, 2005	Choice Hissy Fit	Queen Latifah	Nominated	
Black Movie Awards	2005/2006	Outstanding Performance by an Actress in a Leading Role	Queen Latifah	Nominated	
Black Movie Awards	2005/2006	Outstanding Achievement in Writing	Kate Lanier, Norman Vance Jr.	Nominated	
Black Reel Awards	February 18, 2006	Best Actress	Queen Latifah	Nominated	
NAACP Image Awards	February 25, 2006	Outstanding Actress in a Motion Picture	Queen Latifah	Nominated	
Stinkers Bad Movie Awards	March 3, 2006	Worst Supporting Actress	Alicia Silverstone	Nominated	
Stinkers Bad Movie Awards	March 3, 2006	Most Annoying Fake Accent (Female)	Alicia Silverstone	Nominated	
BET Awards	June 27, 2006	Outstanding Directing for a Theatrical Film	Billie Woodruff	Nominated	
BET Awards	June 27, 2006	Outstanding Lead Actress in a Theatrical Film	Queen Latifah	Nominated	
BET Awards	June 27, 2006	Outstanding Theatrical Film	Beauty Shop (MGM/20th Century Fox)	Nominated	
BET Awards	June 27, 2006	Outstanding Writing for a Theatrical Film	Audrey Wells, Kate Lanier, Norman Vance Jr.	Nominated	
