= Michael Laimo =

American horror author (born 1966)

Michael Laimo (born 1966 in Brooklyn, New York) is an American horror author. He has been nominated for several Bram Stoker Awards. Two of his works, Deep in the Darkness and Dead Souls, have been made into feature films; his short story 1-800-Suicide was adapted into a short film.

== Awards ==
- Bram Stoker Award for Best First Novel for Atmosphere (2002, nominated)
- Bram Stoker Award for Novel for Deep in the Darkness (2004, nominated)

== Bibliography ==
- Atmosphere (2002)
- Deep in the Darkness (2004)
- Sleepwalker (2004)
- The Demonologist (2005)
- Dead Souls (2007, published in Germany as Dämonenfeuer in 2010)
- Desecration (2007)
- Dark Ride (2008)
- Fires Rising (2008)
- Return to Darkness (2011)
- Dregs of Society (2011)
- The Potato (2012)

=== Collections ===
- Demons, Freaks And Other Abnormalities (1999)
- A Walk on the Darkside: Visions of Horror (2004, contributor)
- Strange Bedfellows (2004, contributor)
- Lost on the Darkside: Voices From The Edge of Horror (2005, contributor)
- In Delirium (2006, contributor)
- The Best of All Flesh: Zombie Anthology (2010, contributor)
- Demons, Freaks & Other Abnormalities (2010)
- Best New Vampire Tales Vol 1 (2011, contributor)
- RARE CUTS, a short story collection (2012)
- Morpheus Tales: The Best Weird Fiction Volume 1 (2012, contributor)
- Zippered Flesh: Tales of Body Enhancements Gone Bad! (2012, contributor)
- Best New Werewolf Tales Vol. 1 (2012, contributor)
- Splatterlands: Reawakening the Splatterpunk Revolution (2013, contributor)
- Lucky 13: Thirteen Tales of Crime & Mayhem (2014, contributor)
