= Barbershop Canyon =

Valley in Coconino County, Arizona, US

Coordinates: 34.5503047°N 111.1626358°W

Barbershop Canyon is a valley in Coconino County, Arizona, in the United States.

Barbershop Canyon received its name from the fact that sheep were sheared there.
