= Sean Patrick Thomas =

American actor

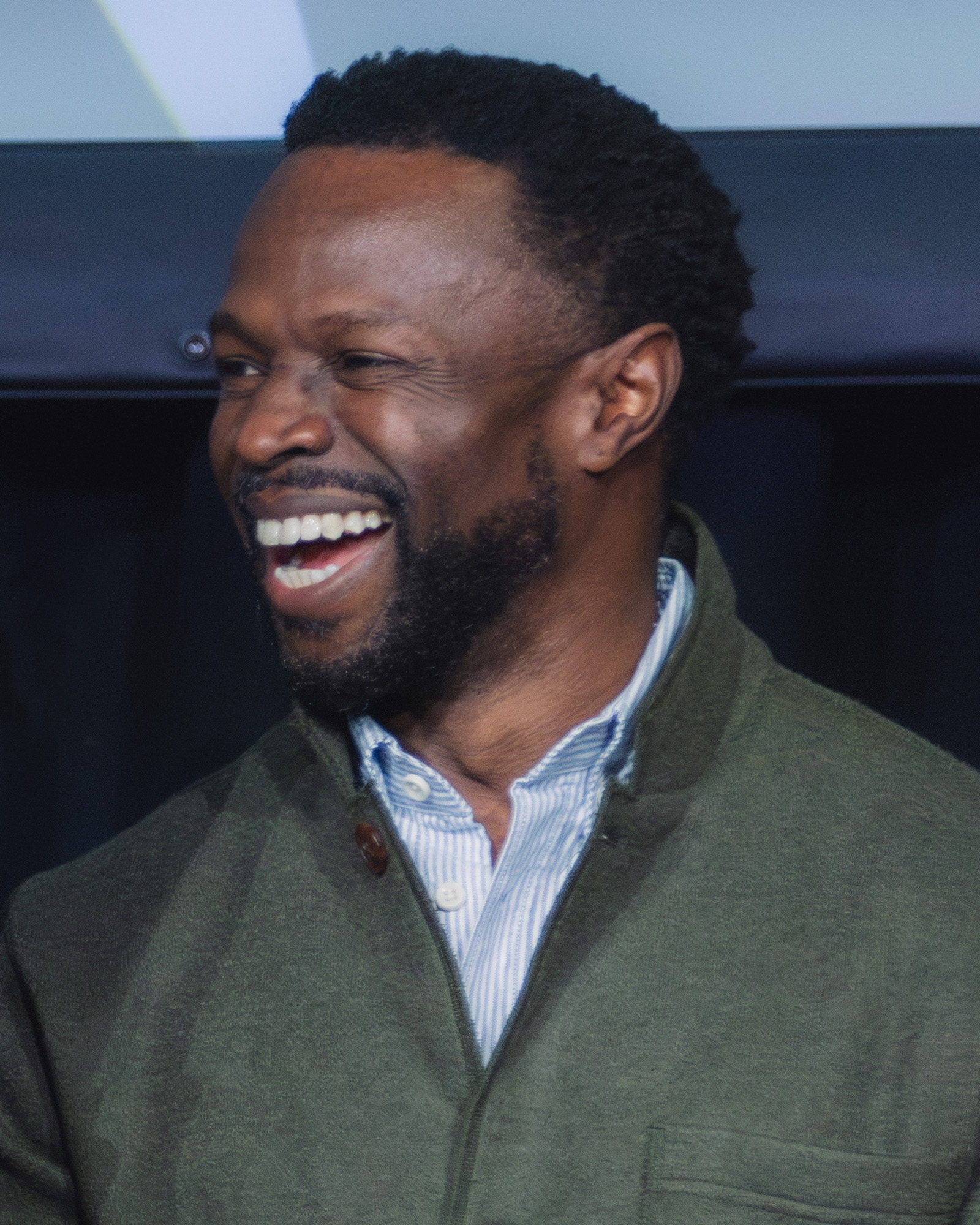
- Thomas in 2024
- Born: Washington, D.C., U.S.
- Education: University of Virginia (BA); New York University (MFA)
- Occupation: Actor
- Years active: 1995–present
- Spouse: Aonika Laurent (m. 2006)
- Children: 2

Sean Patrick Thomas is an American actor. He is best known for his role as Derek Reynolds in the 2001 film Save the Last Dance and as Jimmy James in Barbershop (2002), Barbershop 2: Back in Business (2004), and Barbershop: The Next Cut (2016), as well as his television role as Detective Temple Page in The District and as Professor Macalester in Vixen (2015–2016).

== Early life ==
Thomas was born in Washington, D.C., the son of emigrants from Guyana. He was raised in Wilmington, Delaware, the son of Cheryl, a financial analyst for DuPont, and Carlton Thomas, an engineer who also worked for DuPont.

Thomas, who has two younger siblings, graduated from Brandywine High School in Delaware and attended the University of Virginia. He originally intended to study law, but upon successfully auditioning for a role in the play A Raisin in the Sun, Thomas changed directions and decided to attend New York University's prestigious Graduate Acting Program at the Tisch School of the Arts, graduating in 1995.

== Career ==
Thomas began appearing in screen roles in the mid-1990s, and had minor roles in several films, including Conspiracy Theory (1997), Can't Hardly Wait (1998), and Cruel Intentions (1999). His first leading role was in the teen romance Save the Last Dance, in which he starred opposite Julia Stiles. The film opened in January 2001 and became successful among teen audiences, grossing over $90 million domestically. Subsequently, Thomas appeared in supporting roles in the films Barbershop and Halloween: Resurrection, both of which were released in 2002. Thomas was a cast member on The District, a television crime drama that aired on CBS from 2000 to 2004.

Thomas played recurring character Alan Townsend on Reaper. He originated the recurring character of Karl Dupree on Lie to Me. In 2009, he took to the stage, playing the title role in Othello for the Theatre for a New Audience in New York. This production moved to the Intiman Theatre in Seattle for the summer. In 2012, he worked with Ioan Gruffudd and Sarah Michelle Gellar in Ringer. He was originally cast as Cyborg for Justice League: Throne of Atlantis, replacing Shemar Moore from Justice League: War, who was initially not available to reprise his role. But after Sean Patrick Thomas recorded the role, Shemar Moore was available again so Andrea Romano, for the sake of continuity, recast Thomas with Shemar Moore who lip synced to the earlier performance of Thomas.

Thomas portrayed Dr. Michael Cayle in the horror film Deep in the Darkness, based on the Michael Laimo novel with the same name. In The Boys spinoff Gen V, he portrayed former superhero Polarity. Initially having a recurring role in Season 1, he was promoted to the main cast for Season 2. In 2024, Thomas portrayed Professor Chadwick in a TV adaptation of Cruel Intentions; Thomas portrayed the character of Ronald Clifford in the 1999 film of the same name.

== Personal life ==
Thomas married actress Aonika Laurent in New Orleans on Saturday, April 22, 2006. Their original wedding date had been Saturday, November 5, 2005, but had to be postponed due to Hurricane Katrina. The couple met at a party thrown by Barbershop director Tim Story. The couple have two children.

== Filmography ==
=== Film ===
Year	Film	Role	Notes
1996	Courage Under Fire	Sergeant Thompson	
1997	Picture Perfect	Ad Agency Researcher No. 2	
1997	Conspiracy Theory	Surveillance Operator	
1998	Can't Hardly Wait	Ben, Jock No. 2	
1999	Cruel Intentions	Ronald Clifford	
1999	The Sterling Chase	Darren	
1999	Graham's Diner	-	
2000	Herschel Hopper: New York Rabbit	Mo	Voice
2000	Dracula 2000	Trick	
2001	Save the Last Dance	Derek Reynolds	
2001	Not Another Teen Movie	The Other Token Black Guy	
2002	Barbershop	Jimmy James	
2002	Halloween: Resurrection	Rudy Grimes	
2003	Batman: Mystery of the Batwoman	Additional Voices	Voice, direct-to-video
2004	Barbershop 2: Back in Business	Jimmy James	
2006	The Fountain	Antonio	
2007	Honeydripper	Dex	
2008	A Raisin in the Sun	George Murchison	Television film
2008	The Burrowers	Walnut Callaghan	
2012	Murder on the 13th Floor	Jordan Braxton	Television film
2012	The Selection	Sylvan Santos	Television film
2013	Finding Neighbors	Paul	
2014	Deep in the Darkness	Dr. Michael Cayle	
2015	The Murder Pact	Detective Dakoulas	Television film
2016	Barbershop: The Next Cut	Jimmy James	
2016	My B.F.F.	Dr. LeBlanc	
2016	Merry Ex-Mas	Mitchell	Television film
2017	Vixen	Professor Adam Macalester	Voice, direct-to-video
2018	Rent-an-Elf	Liam	Television film
2018	Union	Justin	Short
2019	The Curse of La Llorona	Detective Cooper	
2019	Lying and Stealing	Trey Walker	
2019	Christmas Hotel	Connor	Television film
2020	Influence	Jeffrey Bowen	
2021	The Tragedy of Macbeth	Monteith	
2021	Horror Noire	Mr. Clay	
2022	Trophy Wife	Marc Carter	
2022	Till	Gene Mobley	
2024	Kemba	Gus Smith	

=== Television ===
Year	Title	Role	Notes
1995	One Life to Live	Tico	Episode: "Episode #1.6955"
1996	New York Undercover	Russell	Episode: "The Enforcers"
1998	Push	-	Episode: "Pilot"
2000–2004	The District	Officer/Detective Temple Page	Main cast
2002	The Agency	Det. Temple Page	Episode: "Doublecrossover"
2003	Static Shock	Marcus Reed, Dante	Voice, 2 episodes
2009	Reaper	Alan Townsend	Recurring role (season 2)
2009	Lie to Me	Karl Dupree	Recurring role (season 1)
2010	Army Wives	Staff Sgt. Tyrell Sallers	Episode: "Change of Station"
2011	Reed Between the Lines	Kenneth	Episode: "Let's Talk About Ms. Helen's Son, Part 1 & 2"
2012	Ringer	Solomon Vessida	Recurring cast
2012	American Horror Story: Asylum	Terry	Episode: "Dark Cousin"
2015	Bones	Dr. John Cruz	Episode: "The Resurrection in the Remains"
2015–2016	Vixen	Professor Macalester	Main cast
2016	NCIS: New Orleans	Lieutenant Commander Mark Jacoby	Episode: "No Man's Land"
2017	Criminal Minds	Agent Terry Richardson	Episode: "Killer App"
2017	Kevin (Probably) Saves the World	Rick Thomas	Episode: "Brutal Acts of Kindness"
2018	Madam Secretary	President Claude Galbert	Episode: "The Courage to Continue"
2019	NCIS	Ian Rackham	Episode: "Crossing the Line"
2019	The Good Fight	Geoffrey Payton	Recurring role (season 3)
2019	Middle School Moguls	Mr. Pierre	Voice, recurring role
2020	Ghost Tape	Luke Dixon	Recurring role
2020	S.W.A.T.	Bishop Miller	Episode: "Hopeless Sinner"
2021	Invincible	Guard #2	Voice, episode: "It's About Time"
2021	Insecure	Taurean's Brother	Episode: "Everything Gonna Be, Okay?!"
2022–2024	For All Mankind	Corey Johnson	Recurring role (seasons 3–4)
2022	The Boys Presents: Diabolical	Reporter #1, Male Hostage	Voice, episode: "One Plus One Equals Two"
2022	Reasonable Doubt	Brayden Miller	Main cast
2023–2025	Gen V	Polarity	Recurring role (season 1), Main role (season 2); 8 episodes
2024	Cruel Intentions	Professor Chadwick	
2025	High Potential	Dexter Price	Episode: "The RAMs"
2026	Law & Order: Special Victims Unit	Nate Williams	Episode: "Hubris"
2026	The Rookie	Malcolm Walsh	6 episodes
