= Omar Gooding =

American actor (born 1976)

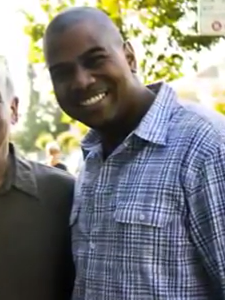
- Gooding in 2016
- Born: Omar Miles Gooding; October 19, 1976 (age 49); Los Angeles, California, U.S.
- Other name: Big O
- Occupations: Actor, comedian
- Years active: 1988–present
- Children: 2
- Father: Cuba Gooding Sr.
- Relatives: Cuba Gooding Jr. (brother); Mason Gooding (nephew)

Omar Miles Gooding (born October 19, 1976), also known by his stage name Big O, is an American actor and comedian.

== Early life and education ==
Omar Gooding was born in Los Angeles, on October 19, 1976, to Shirley (née Sullivan) and Cuba Gooding Sr., the former lead singer for The Main Ingredient. His older brother is Academy Award-winning actor Cuba Gooding Jr.

Omar graduated from North Hollywood High School in 1994.

== Career ==
Gooding is best known for appearing in television shows, such as Touched by an Angel, Wild & Crazy Kids, Hangin' with Mr. Cooper, Smart Guy, and Playmakers, and also the films Ghost Dad and Baby Boy for which he received critical praise for his role as "Sweetpea". He was one of the original hosts of the Nickelodeon television show Wild & Crazy Kids from 1990 to 1992.

Gooding played D.H., a running back, on Playmakers in 2003. He played the character Odell in the third season of Deadwood. In 2005, he took the role of Calvin Palmer Jr. in the television series Barbershop, in the role originated by Ice Cube in the 2002 film of the same name. Coincidentally, he also appeared in a recurring role as a barber on the UPN sitcom One on One.

From April 2010 to July 2010, Gooding starred as trauma charge nurse, Tuck Brody, in the Bruckheimer television series Miami Medical. From 2012 to 2020, he starred in the Bounce TV series Family Time.

Gooding played a main role as Carter in the film Percentage. He released a hip hop album titled The Excuse in 2019.

In 2023, Gooding played Cal Johnson in the Disney Channel series Saturdays.

== Filmography ==
=== Film ===
| Year | Title | Role | Notes |
|---|---|---|---|
| 1990 | Ghost Dad | Stuart | |
| 1993 | The Ernest Green Story | Marcus | TV movie |
| 2000 | Freedom Song | Charlie | TV movie |
| 2001 | Baby Boy | Sweetpea | |
| 2005 | Mysterious Island | Neb | TV movie |
| 2005 | The Gospel | Wesley | |
| 2007 | Lord Help Us | Man in Church | Video |
| 2008 | The Candy Shop | Antwon Lemiuex | |
| 2009 | Knuckle Draggers | Russell | |
| 2012 | Christmas in Compton | Derrick Hollander | |
| 2013 | The Devil's Dozen | - | |
| 2013 | Holla II | Marty | |
| 2013 | Thank You Card | Detective Jansen | Short |
| 2014 | Percentage | Carter | |
| 2014 | Patterns of Attraction | Andre Moore | |
| 2014 | Men, Money & Gold Diggers | Damon | |
| 2014 | Behind De Pole | Gary G | |
| 2014 | Lap Dance | Black | |
| 2014 | 99 North | Devious | |
| 2014 | In God's Hands | Vince | TV movie |
| 2015 | Prom Ride | Chauffeur | |
| 2016 | Betrothed | Sergeant Earl Stone | |
| 2016 | Guns and Grams | Dee | |
| 2016 | Banger | Fazon | |
| 2016 | Before 'I Do' | Shelby Winters | |
| 2016 | Only for One Night | Scott | |
| 2016 | King of Newark | Federal Agent | |
| 2016 | Boy Bye | David | |
| 2017 | The Perfect Wife | Principal James | |
| 2017 | Beyond the Shield | Pastor Omar | |
| 2017 | The Hills | Craig Harris | |
| 2017 | Don't Shoot | Detective Green | |
| 2018 | Fade Away | O | |
| 2018 | Easy Money | Darnell | |
| 2018 | Hey, Mr. Postman! | Mack | |
| 2018 | It's a Date | Dalton Reid | |
| 2018 | Sliders | Darnell | |
| 2019 | The Untold Story | Aaron | |
| 2019 | 7th and Westlake: Nino's Revenge | Big Murder | |
| 2019 | Perfectly Single | Ronnie | |
| 2019 | The Fearless Two | Tommy | |
| 2019 | Camp Wilson | Byron | |
| 2019 | Christmas Belles | Donovan | TV movie |
| 2020 | A Familiar Lie | Big 'O' | |
| 2020 | Escape: Puzzle of Fear | Tyler | |
| 2020 | Guns and Grams | Dee | |
| 2021 | A Day of Trouble | Marc | |
| 2021 | No Love No Pain | AJ | |
| 2021 | AM Radio | DJ Taz | |
| 2021 | Entanglement | Romulo | |
| 2021 | Blood Sacrifice | Nikko | |
| 2021 | Strange Fruit: Tale of a Black Girl Lost | Kareem | |
| 2021 | True to the Game 3 | Nino | |
| 2022 | You Can Never Go Home Again | Jack Fletcher | |
| 2022 | Unfinished | Dr. Solomon | |
| 2022 | Blunt News | Detective Tommy Brown | |
| 2022 | The Leo Movie | Preacher | |
| 2022 | 17 Days | Officer Cloud | |
| 2022 | One More Dream | Jeremy's Dad | |
| 2022 | Pieces | Gio | |
| 2022 | My Perfect Wedding | Carter | |
| 2023 | Prisoner of Love | Johnathan | |
| 2023 | Uncle Rufus' Last Request | Darius Brown | |
| 2023 | The Fearless Three | Male Commentator | |
| 2023 | Unfinished Business: Kingston High | Principal Hopkins | |
| 2023 | Fatal Witness | Pooch | |
| 2023 | Bora | Big O | |
| 2023 | Bay Lawz: Stick to the Code | Freeza | |
| 2023 | Primary Position | Corporal Doug Richards | |
| 2023 | Holiday in the Vineyards | Moe Walker | |
| 2024 | Trap City | Baby Boy | |
| 2024 | Garlic Parmesan | Kevin | |
| 2024 | It's All or Nothing | KT | |
| 2024 | Bissonnet 2: Back on the Blade | Detective Wallace | |
| 2024 | Negligence | Charles | |
| 2024 | Rock | Rio | |
| 2024 | Bottle Girl | Professor James | |
| 2024 | Persona | Ryan | |
| 2025 | The Midas Code | Agent Harris | |
| 2025 | Betrayal at First Hand | Big D | |
| 2025 | A Higher Power | P-Loc | |
| 2025 | Not Every Woman | Ed Jenkins | |
| 2025 | My Cherie Amour | Pastor James | |
| 2025 | The Advice That Got You Killed | Tony Smith | |
| 2025 | Sharks N Da Hood | Miles | |
| 2025 | Persona | Ryan | |
| 2026 | I Loved Lucy | Jaquan | |
| 2026 | Between Love & Justice | Tom | |

=== Television ===
| Year | Title | Role | Notes |
|---|---|---|---|
| 1988 | Webster | Club M.C. | Episode: "The Web-Touchables" |
| 1990 | Just the Ten of Us | Scout | Episode: "Perfect Date" |
| 1990–92 | Wild & Crazy Kids | Himself (Host) | Main cast |
| 1991–92 | Blossom | Brad/Tyler | Recurring cast (season 2), guest (season 3) |
| 1992 | Empty Nest | Jason | Episode: "Sayonara" |
| 1992 | The Royal Family | Art | Recurring cast |
| 1992–97 | Hangin' with Mr. Cooper | Earvin Rodman | Main cast |
| 1994 | Thea | Dwayne | Episode: "Who's Zoomin' Who?" |
| 1997–99 | Smart Guy | Morris L. "Mo" Tibbs | Main cast |
| 1999 | Zoe, Duncan, Jack and Jane | Doug Anderson | Recurring cast (season 2) |
| 1999–2000 | Batman Beyond | Jared Tate, Trey | Voice, 3 episodes |
| 2000 | Static Shock | Wade | Voice, episode: "Shock to the System" |
| 2001 | Touched by an Angel | Ben McCloud | Episode: "The Perfect Game" |
| 2002 | The Division | Dom Cabrillo | Recurring cast (season 2) |
| 2002–03 | One on One | Malik | Recurring cast (season 2) |
| 2003 | Playmakers | Demetrius Harris | Main cast |
| 2005 | Barbershop | Calvin Palmer, Jr. | Main cast |
| 2006 | Eve | Lazy G | Episode: "Donovan on the Brink" |
| 2006 | Deadwood | Odell Marchbanks | Recurring cast (season 3) |
| 2006 | CSI: Miami | Mr. Ice | Episode: "Death Pool 100" |
| 2010 | Miami Medical | Nurse Tuck Brody | Main cast |
| 2010 | Grey's Anatomy | Danny | Episode: "Superfreak" |
| 2011 | Chase | Francis Washington | Episode: "The Man at the Altar" |
| 2012–14 | Single Ladies | Marcus | Recurring cast (season 2), guest (season 4) |
| 2012–20 | Family Time | Anthony "Tony" Stallworth | Main cast |
| 2014–15 | Breeder X | Detective | Main cast |
| 2015 | Big Time in Hollywood, FL | Himself | Episode: "To Catch a Paparazzi" |
| 2015 | Extant | Dave | Episode: "Change Scenario" |
| 2017 | C.E.O. | Barlow | Episode: "Revenge" |
| 2018 | Unsolved | David Mack | Recurring cast |
| 2020 | 5th Ward The Series | Robert Kennedy | Main cast (season 2) |
| 2023 | Saturdays | Cal Johnson | Main cast |

=== Stage ===
| Year | Production | Role |
|---|---|---|
| 2006 | Men, Money & Gold Diggers | Damon |
| 2018 | Redemption of a Dogg | |
| 2024 | New Jack City: Live on Stage | Stone |

=== Guest appearances ===
| Year | Song | Artist(s) | Album |
|---|---|---|---|
| 2012 | "No Warning" (featuring Young Buck & Big O) | C-Bo | Orca |
