= Troy Garity =

American actor (born 1973)

- Born: July 7, 1973 (age 53); Los Angeles, California, U.S.
- Occupation: Actor
- Years active: 1974–present
- Spouse: Simone Bent (m. 2007)
- Parent(s): Tom Hayden; Jane Fonda
- Relatives: Henry Fonda (maternal grandfather); Frances Ford Seymour (maternal grandmother); Peter Fonda (maternal uncle); Bridget Fonda (maternal cousin)

Troy Garity (born July 7, 1973) is an American actor. He is known for his role as Isaac in the Barbershop film series and as Barry Winchell in the television movie Soldier's Girl (2003), where he was nominated for a Golden Globe Award for Best Actor – Miniseries or Television Film. He also had recurring roles in the series Boss (2011–2012) and Ballers (2015–2019).

== Early life, family and education ==
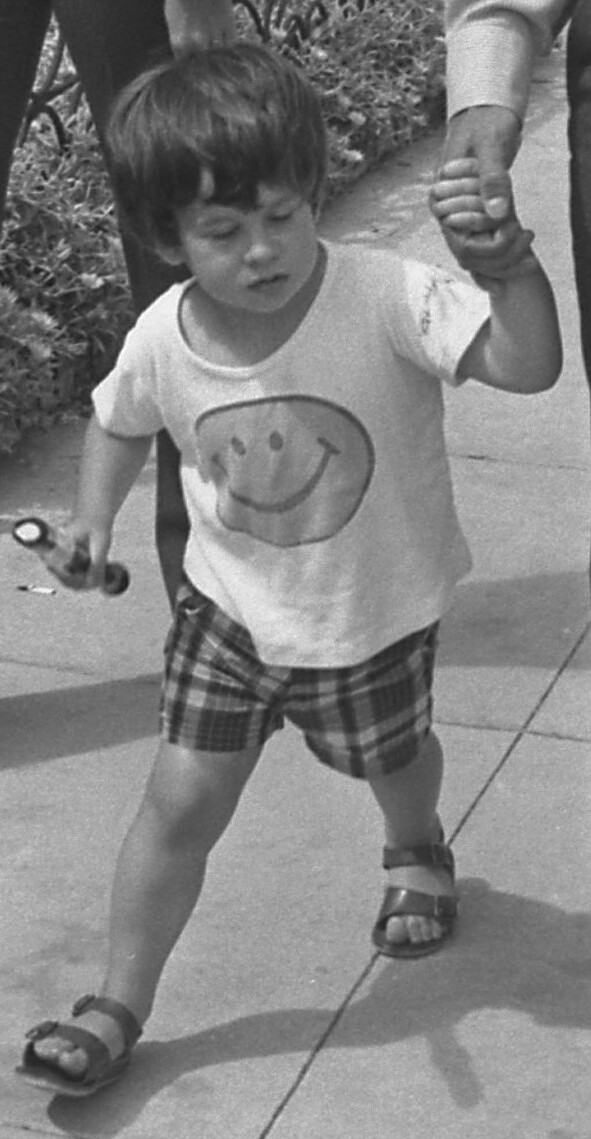
Garity, age 3, June 1976

Garity was born in Los Angeles, California, to actress and activist Jane Fonda and activist and politician Tom Hayden. His parents gave him the last name Garity, the surname of his paternal grandmother. His first name is to honor Vietnamese martyr Nguyễn Văn Trỗi. He grew up in Santa Monica. His half-sister is director and cinematographer Vanessa Vadim.

Through his mother, Garity is the grandson of New York socialite Frances Ford Seymour and actor Henry Fonda, and a nephew of actor Peter Fonda. His cousins include actress Bridget Fonda. His father is of Irish descent and his mother's ancestry includes Dutch, English, French, German, and Irish.

Garity made his first onscreen appearance as an infant, when his parents carried him through their Vietnam travelogue, Introduction to the Enemy (1974). He began acting as a child at Santa Barbara's Laurel Springs Camp for the Arts. He made an uncredited appearance in the film On Golden Pond (1981), trained at the American Academy of Dramatic Arts in NYC, and became a member of the Academy Repertory Company, performing in a number of stage productions.

== Career ==
Garity has appeared in numerous film productions. He played his father in the film Steal This Movie (2000) based on the life of Yippie founder Abbie Hoffman. His portrayal of Isaac Rosenberg in the film Barbershop (2002) proved to be his breakout role, and he reprised it in Barbershop 2: Back in Business (2004) and Barbershop: The Next Cut (2016) – though in the latter, his role is significantly reduced to a cameo appearance. He also starred as Harvey in the Danny Boyle/Alex Garland film Sunshine (2007) and as the tormented survivor of a tragic family accident in Lake City (2008).

In 1998, Garity was named one of People magazine's "50 Most Beautiful People". The first extensive interview with Garity in a major publication appeared in The Los Angeles Times in September 1998.

== Honors ==
For his portrayal of Barry Winchell in the film Soldier's Girl (2003), Garity earned a Golden Globe nomination for Best Actor in a Miniseries or a Motion Picture Made for Television and in 2002 he won the Young Hollywood Award for a Standout Performance.

== Personal life ==
On August 27, 2007, Garity married actress Simone Bent at St. Paul's Chapel at Columbia University. Today, he is the founder of the Peace Process Network, an international gang violence-prevention coalition, and is the chairman of Homies Unidos ("homies united"), a gang violence-prevention group in Los Angeles.

== Filmography ==
=== Film ===
Year	Title	Role	Notes	Ref.
1974	Introduction to the Enemy	Himself		
1981	On Golden Pond	Young Boy	Uncredited	
1997	Conspiracy Theory	Intern		
2000	Steal This Movie!	Tom Hayden		
2000	Solomon Bernstein's Bathroom	Solomon Bernstein	Short film	
2001	Perfume	Simon		
2001	Bandits	Harvey Pollard		
2002	Lather. Rinse. Repeat.	John Donnelly	Short film	
2002	Barbershop	Isaac		
2003	Milwaukee, Minnesota	Albert Burroughs		
2004	Barbershop 2: Back in Business	Isaac		
2004	After the Sunset	Luc		
2007	Sunshine	Harvey		
2007	Eichmann	Avner Less		
2008	Lake City	Billy		
2008	Winged Creatures	Ron Abler		
2008	A Cat's Tale	Marchello		
2009	My One and Only	Becker		
2009	A Day in the Life	Officer Klute		
2009	Kerosene Cowboys	Luke "Cajun" Babbineaux		
2011	The Good Doctor	Dan		
2013	Gangster Squad	Wrevock		
2014	Sabotage	DEA Agent Spolcheck		
2016	Barbershop: The Next Cut	Isaac	Cameo	
2016	The Brooklyn Banker	Santo Bastucci		
2024	Bull Run	Axl		

=== Television ===
Year	Title	Role	Notes	Ref.
1996	The Cherokee Kid	The Bartender	Television film	
2000	Rude Awakening	Vin	Episode: "How Was Your Date?"	
2003	Soldier's Girl	Barry Winchell	Television film Nominated—Golden Globe Award for Best Actor – Miniseries or Television Film; Nominated—Independent Spirit Award for Best Supporting Male; Nominated—Satellite Award for Best Actor – Miniseries or Television Film	
2009	House	Hank Hardwick	Episode: "Teamwork"	
2011	Hawaii Five-0	FBI Agent Edward Kipton	Episode: "Loa Aloha"	
2011	The Playboy Club	John Bianchi	4 episodes	
2011–2012	Boss	Sam Miller	Recurring role (season 1), main role (season 2)	
2013	Elementary	Lucas Bundsch	Episode: "On the Line"	
2015–2019	Ballers	Jason	Recurring role	
2017	Shooter	Jeffrey Denning	4 episodes	
2019	Magnum P.I.	James Harris / Daniel Skordi	Episode: "He Came by Night"	
2020	BlackAF	Jim	Episode: "yup, you guessed it. again, this is because of slavery"	
2021	Punky Brewster	Jessie	Episode: "Looking for Love and a Hat"	
2021	On the Verge	George	Main role	
2024	Law & Order: Special Victims Unit	Josh Blake	Episode: "Constricted"	
2026	The Rookie	Ethan McAvoy	Episode: "Out of Time"	

=== Video game ===
- Code Blue (2000); voiced Daniel Mosley
