= Robert Teitel =

American film producer

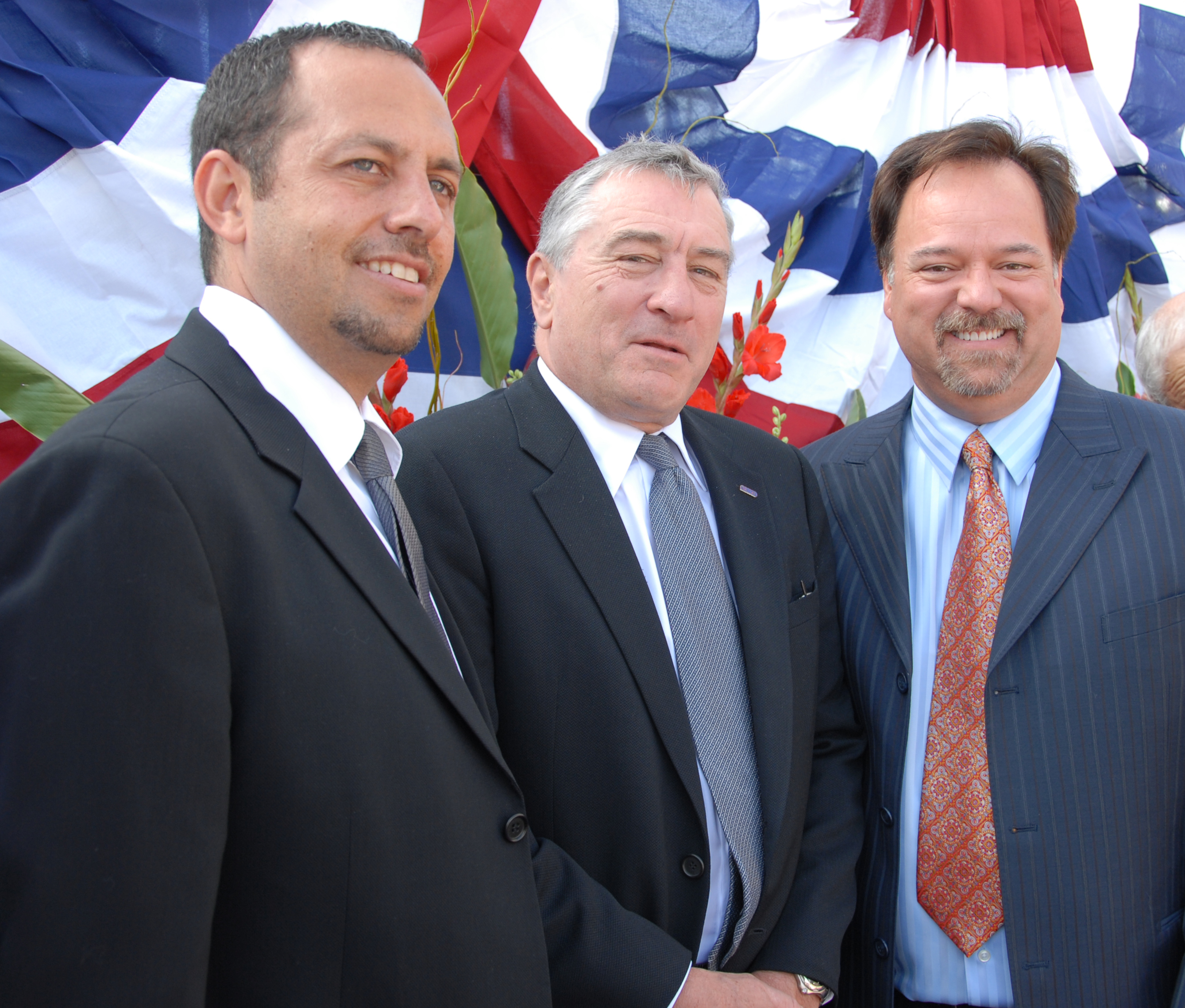
Teitel with Robert De Niro and screenwriter Scott Smith

Robert Teitel is an American film producer and writer.

Teitel produced the films Soul Food (1997), Men of Honor (2000), and the three films in the Barbershop series: Barbershop, Barbershop 2: Back in Business, and Beauty Shop. He also co-produced the television series Barbershop: The Series.

A 1990 graduate of Columbia College Chicago, he has been associated with writer/director George Tillman Jr. since they were students there.

== Filmography ==
He was a producer in all films unless otherwise noted.

=== Film ===
Year	Film	Credit
1995	Scenes for the Soul	
1997	Soul Food	
2000	Men of Honor	
2002	Barbershop	
2004	Barbershop 2: Back in Business	
2005	Beauty Shop	
2005	Roll Bounce	
2008	Nothing like the Holidays	
2009	Notorious	
2010	Faster	
2012	Jayne Mansfield's Car	Executive producer
2012	The Baytown Outlaws	
2013	The Inevitable Defeat of Mister & Pete	
2015	The Longest Ride	Executive producer
2015	Perla	
2016	Southside with You	
2016	Barbershop: The Next Cut	
2017	Mudbound	Executive producer
2018	The Hate U Give	
2019	Beats	
2022	On the Come Up	
2024	Bob Marley: One Love	

As writer

Year	Film
2008	Nothing like the Holidays

=== Television ===
Year	Title	Credit	Notes
2000−04	Soul Food	Executive producer	
2005	Barbershop	Executive producer	
2006	The Brandon T. Jackson Show	Executive producer	Television special
2017	Michael Jackson: Searching for Neverland	Executive producer	Television film
2023	The Crossover	Executive producer	
