= Barbershop: The Next Cut =

2016 film directed by Malcolm D. Lee

- Theatrical release poster
- Directed by: Malcolm D. Lee
- Written by: Kenya Barris; Tracy Oliver
- Based on: Characters by Mark Brown
- Produced by: Ice Cube; Robert Teitel; George Tillman Jr.
- Starring: Ice Cube; Cedric the Entertainer; Regina Hall; Anthony Anderson; Eve; J.B. Smoove; Lamorne Morris; Sean Patrick Thomas; Tyga; Deon Cole; Common; Nicki Minaj
- Cinematography: Greg Gardiner
- Edited by: Paul Millspaugh
- Music by: Stanley Clarke
- Production companies: New Line Cinema; Metro-Goldwyn-Mayer Pictures; State Street Pictures; Cube Vision
- Distributed by: Warner Bros. Pictures
- Release dates: April 6, 2016 (Los Angeles); April 15, 2016 (United States)
- Running time: 112 minutes
- Country: United States
- Language: English
- Budget: $20 million
- Box office: $55 million

Barbershop: The Next Cut (also known as Barbershop 3 or Barbershop 3: The Next Cut) is a 2016 American comedy film directed by Malcolm D. Lee, written by Kenya Barris and Tracy Oliver and produced by Ice Cube, Robert Teitel and George Tillman Jr. It is the sequel to 2004's Barbershop 2: Back in Business and the third installment in the Barbershop film series. It stars an ensemble cast including actors Ice Cube, Cedric the Entertainer, Anthony Anderson, Eve, Sean Patrick Thomas, and Deon Cole who return, as well as new cast members Regina Hall, J. B. Smoove, Lamorne Morris, Tyga, Common, and Nicki Minaj. It is the first film in the series in which Michael Ealy and Leonard Earl Howze did not reprise their roles as Ricky and Dinka, respectively.

The project was announced in March 2014, and Lee was hired to direct the film in February 2015. Principal photography began in Atlanta in May 2015 with some aerial shots filmed in Chicago.

Barbershop: The Next Cut was released on April 15, 2016, by Warner Bros. Pictures. It received generally positive reviews from critics, with praise directed at the performances of the cast, Lee's direction, and the screenplay. It was a moderate box office success, grossing $55 million worldwide on a $20 million production budget.

== Plot ==
Calvin loves Chicago, his hometown and the place where he has been running his barbershop business in addition to supporting his family. Unfortunately, the city has become plagued by gang violence and criminal activity as of late, and tensions have begun to rise, especially in his neighborhood. Eddie comes running into the barbershop frightened because he claims to have made a comment at some thugs over their pants sagging. He gets Calvin panicked as the door starts banging, but it is really just a delivery man bringing him his breakfast, to his annoyance.

Calvin and Angie now run the barbershop. It has a separate section for women to work, with new recruits Bree and Draya. On the men's side are Jerrod, Raja, and Rashad, new husband of Terri. Isaac and Jimmy no longer work there, but still keep in touch as customers.

JD, the estranged cousin of former barber Ricky, has given up a life of crime and now runs a food truck business. However, he openly lies about what he does with the proceeds from the food truck business, claiming that he donates the money to charity. In truth, he and his overbearing grandmother keep the money for themselves. The shop also has a boy named Anthony Clark working there while he puts his focus on school.

Rashad's son Kenny has been hanging out with Calvin's son Jalen. The boys come in one morning before school, and Calvin catches him trying to swipe two Snickers bars.

Outside members of the Gangster Disciples pull up and try to steal the boys' sneakers, until the Vice Lords from the area appear and tell the other gang to step off. The Vice Lords leader, Yummy is friendly with the boys, assuming that they are willing to join his gang, and hands each boy a $100 bill.

The men and women of the barbershop converse on the subject of modern women, with Bree arguing that good women are always losing to the "hoes," and that men complain about women having fake body parts but still lust after those same women.

Another topic of discussion is racism against black people, which Raja disagrees with on the basis that the country has a black President, to which Rashad counters that Obama, a former Chicago resident, has done nothing when news involving murdered black children have been all over the media. Still, he insists that there has never been a better time to be a black person.

Calvin has recently been talking to a smooth talking businessman called One-Stop about taking the barbershop business from the south side to the north side to avoid the dangers in the streets. Only his wife Jennifer is aware of this, and she's only considering for Jalen's sake.

A regular client, Jay, enters for an appointment with Draya, but another man, Marquis, shows up, clearly having a beef with Jay. The two men nearly fight in the shop as it is revealed they are both "shot callers" from rival gangs, until he and Rashad intervene.

The boys get in trouble at school after being involved in a fight with the gang from earlier that morning. Jalen is unharmed, but Kenny has a bruise under his eye. It pushes Calvin to consider putting his son in Catholic school, and also makes him trust Kenny even less, to the point where he confronts Rashad and tells him that they shouldn't be hanging out so much. Things get more serious when Jennifer goes through her son's dresser drawers and finds gang paraphernalia.

With trouble going on in the neighborhood, Jimmy stops by and says there is a plan for an enclosure with heavy police presence, which would hurt the businesses. The members of the shop band together to organize a forum that night with the community to set up a ceasefire, along with free haircuts to anyone that passes by.

Outside the shop, Terri becomes suspicious of Draya for being flirty and close to Rashad. He offers to take her home one evening on his way to pick up his daughter. She invites Rashad up to her apartment to talk, but Rashad knows what's up, even if she denies it being sexual, and declines her offer.

The barbershop team set up for Jay and Marquis to arrive at the same time so they can get involved in the ceasefire. After a bit of tension and another near altercation, both men agree to the ceasefire out of respect for Calvin.

Over the weekend, the ceasefire begins. Jerrod and Raja put the word out on Twitter for people to come to the barbershop. A large number of people show up, and things appear to be going smoothly.

While at the barbershop, Rashad goes in the supply room in the back of the shop to grab some items, and Draya does as well. He apologizes for misinterpreting her motives from the other night. She forgives him but then tries to kiss him. Terri enters and heads into the back, looking for him. She catches the both of them hiding in the supply closet after he ignored her calling his name, leading her to believe they were hooking up. Terri attempts to fight Draya, chasing her to the front of the shop, however Calvin and the others stop her. She storms out and Rashad follows to try and explain himself, but she doesn't believe or trust him.

As the shop celebrates a day of peace, Officer Terrence stops by to announce the tragic news that Anthony was shot to death on his way home from the library. Understandably devastated, Calvin gives up on the ceasefire and loses hope that they can make a difference in the neighborhood.

The tension leads to Rashad revealing Calvin's intentions to move the shop to the north side of the city (after overhearing his conversation on a phone call) which infuriates Angie, since he kept his plans from her. Calvin storms out of the shop and goes to the bar, with Eddie joining him. He tries to assure Calvin that although Anthony's death was a tragic loss, they still may have prevented even more gunshot deaths. That inspires Calvin to return to his shop and apologize, while also restarting the ceasefire.

Almost immediately, the shop gets a visit from basketball player Anthony Davis, which brings more attention to the shop. By evening the shop has even more business including media coverage, as well as becoming a trending topic on Twitter.

JD brings his food truck and racks up some nice business as well, until his lies catch up to him and is guilt tripped into giving up a substantial amount of his earnings to a real charity. Terri returns to the shop and sees Rashad. She apologizes for accusing him of adultery and they reconcile.

Kenny runs into the shop and tells Calvin that Jalen is at the park ready for a gang initiation, from which he had previously backed out. Calvin rushes to the park and his son is seen approaching Yummy about the initiation. When he gets there, the gang has left, but he stayed behind. Without a word, he joins his father.

In the morning, the ceasefire comes to an end and the shop celebrates. Everyone begins to go home.

Bree and Jerrod walk together, and they admit they have feelings for each other. They set up a dinner date for the next night. Draya later visits Terri and apologizes for coming onto Rashad, saying that she feels that Terri has her life figured out while she doesn't. Terri forgives her and Draya offers a proposition for the couple.

Jalen visits his dad at the shop asking him to cut his hair. Calvin obliges and cuts off his dreads. They reaffirm they love each other and Calvin tells him to sweep the floor.

Calvin says that he still loves his city, and he never gave up on it, since it had never given up on him. Father and son join Jennifer, Rashad, Terri and the kids.

During the closing credits, the shop gets an unexpected visit from President Obama. Eddie volunteers to give the man a haircut after earlier claiming to have cut his hair years ago. Visibly nervous, Eddie messes up and accidentally shaves a good part on the back of the President's head.

== Cast ==
- Ice Cube as Calvin Palmer Jr.
- Cedric the Entertainer as Eddie Walker
- Regina Hall as Angie
- Sean Patrick Thomas as Jimmy James
- Eve as Terri Jones
- Anthony Anderson as J.D.
- Jazsmin Lewis-Kelley as Jennifer Palmer
- J. B. Smoove as One Stop
- Common as Rashad Smith
- Nicki Minaj as Draya
- Lamorne Morris as Jerrod
- Utkarsh Ambudkar as Raja
- Margot Bingham as Bree
- Deon Cole as Dante
- Troy Garity as Isaac Rosenberg
- Michael Rainey Jr. as Jalen Palmer
- Tyga as Yummy
- Jamal Woolard as Marquese
- Anthony Davis as himself
- Reggie Brown as President Obama
- Jwaundace Candece as Boy's Mother
- Diallo Thompson as Kenny Smith
- Auntie Fee as Mabel
- Rayan Lawrence as Customer #3

== Production ==
On March 26, 2014, Deadline Hollywood reported that MGM was in negotiations with Ice Cube to produce a third Barbershop film. On February 19, 2015, Malcolm D. Lee was set to direct the third film, while Ice Cube and Cedric the Entertainer were in talks to join the film. On March 25, 2015, New Line Cinema signed on with MGM to release the film, while MGM would handle the production. Principal photography began in Atlanta on May 11, 2015. On November 14, 2015, director Malcolm D. Lee said in an interview at the 7th Annual Governors Award ceremony that the title of the film had been changed from Barbershop 3 to Barbershop: The Next Cut.

== Release ==
The film was originally scheduled for release on February 19, 2016, but was pushed back to April 15, 2016.

== Reception ==
=== Box office ===
In the United States and Canada, the film was released alongside The Jungle Book and Criminal, and was projected to gross $26–30 million from 2,661 theaters in its opening weekend. It made $7 million on its first day (including $735,000 from Thursday night previews) and went on to gross $20.2 million, finishing second at the box office behind The Jungle Book ($103.6 million).

The film had a worldwide gross of $55 million.

=== Critical response ===
On Rotten Tomatoes, the film has an approval rating of 91% based on 92 reviews, with an average rating of 6.84/10. The site's critical consensus reads, "Heartfelt, thought-provoking, and above all funny, Barbershop: The Next Cut is the rare belated sequel that more than lives up to the standard set by its predecessors." On Metacritic, the film has a weighted average score of 67 out of 100, based on 30 critics, indicating "generally favorable" reviews. Audiences polled by CinemaScore gave the film an average grade of "A−" on an A+ to F scale, while PostTrak reported a 63% "definitely recommend".

Richard Roeper of the Chicago Sun-Times wrote, "It's impressive how well director Malcolm D. Lee (working from a script by Kenya Barris and Tracy Oliver) balances the serious material with the bawdy, freewheeling comedy pieces."

=== Accolades ===
Award	Category	Recipient	Result
Teen Choice Awards	Choice Movie: Comedy		Nominated
Teen Choice Awards	Choice Movie Actor: Comedy	Ice Cube	Nominated
Teen Choice Awards	Choice Movie Actress: Comedy	Nicki Minaj	Nominated

== Soundtrack ==
BarberShop: The Next Cut (Original Motion Picture Soundtrack)

Soundtrack album by Various artists
- Released: April 8, 2016
- Genres: Hip hop; R&B
- Length: 71:09
- Label: Atlantic

Singles from BarberShop: The Next Cut
- 1. "Good as Hell" Released: March 8, 2016; 2. "Real People" Released: March 24, 2016

Professional ratings
Review scores
Source	Rating
HipHopDX	3.5/5 stars

The soundtrack was released digitally by Atlantic Records on April 8, 2016; it consists of hip hop and R&B music.

=== Track listing ===
No.	Title	Producer(s)	Length
1.	"Real People" (performed by Ice Cube & Common)	Tone Mason & Mark McKay	2:37
2.	"Good as Hell" (performed by Lizzo)	Ricky Reed	2:38
3.	"Working Class Heroes (Work)" (performed by CeeLo Green)	Sean Phelan & CeeLo Green	2:58
4.	"Everything Is" (performed by Gabriel Garzón-Montano)	Gabriel Garzón-Montano	4:15
5.	"It's Just Begun" (performed by the Jimmy Castor Bunch)	Castor-Pruitt Productions	3:32
6.	"Let Go" (performed by Lalah Hathaway)	Rex Rideout	4:06
7.	"Hold On" (performed by Kem)	Kem	4:11
8.	"September" (performed by Earth, Wind & Fire)	Maurice White	3:38
9.	"Set Me Free" (performed by Leela James)	Leela James & John Dee Hammond	3:46
10.	"Respect Yourself" (performed by The Staple Singers)	Al Bell	3:33
11.	"Turn Up" (performed by The Heavy)	The Heavy	3:28
12.	"People Get Up and Drive Your Funky Soul" (performed by James Brown)	James Brown, Cliff White & Tim Rogers	9:05
13.	"Never Too Much" (performed by Luther Vandross)	Luther Vandross	3:51
14.	"Future Is Mine" (performed by DJ Cassidy & Chromeo)	DJ Cassidy	4:22
15.	"Move On Up" (performed by Curtis Mayfield)	Curtis Mayfield	8:56
16.	"Eyes of a Child" (performed by Aloe Blacc)	DJ Khalil	6:13
Total length:			71:09

== See also ==
- List of hood films
