= Leonard Earl Howze =

American actor (born 1977)

- Born: April 26, 1977 (age 49); Los Angeles, California
- Education: Los Angeles County High School for the Arts, State University of New York
- Occupation: Actor
- Years active: 2002–present
- Known for: Barbershop and Barbershop 2: Back in Business

Leonard Earl Howze (born April 26, 1977) is an American actor who has been credited in over 20 movie and television roles, most notably for his role as Dinka in the first two films of the Barbershop trilogy, Barbershop and Barbershop 2: Back in Business. Howze has also made notable acting appearances in the television sitcom Kevin Can Wait, Antwone Fisher, The Lone Ranger and A Thousand Words.

== Acting career ==
Howze was born in Los Angeles, California on April 26, 1977, where he attended the Los Angeles County High School for the Arts and graduated in the class of 1995. Howze also attended the State University of New York at Purchase and received his Bachelor of Fine Arts to begin an acting career. Howze made his acting debut as a supporting character in the 2002 blockbuster film Barbershop, where he portrays Dinka, an optimistic stereotypical African immigrant who attempts charm his crush and barber colleague, Terri played by Eve.

In the 2010s, Howze continued to retain roles in the media, having roles in the films A Thousand Words starring Eddie Murphy and in the 2013 film The Lone Ranger as Homer. He appeared in multiple minor television roles as well including separate episodes of NCIS, Shameless, Legit and The League. Howze has had a recent role in 48 episodes of the television sitcom Kevin Can Wait as a supporting role. Howze says his faith in God and timing as an attribution to his commercial success and lengthy acting career.

== Personal life ==
Howze's hobbies when he's not acting include playing basketball, bowling and playing golf. Howze currently resides in New York during his intervals from filming.

== Filmography ==
=== Film ===
Year	Title	Role	Notes
2002	Barbershop	Dinka	
2002	Antwone Fisher	Pork Chop	
2004	Barbershop 2: Back in Business	Dinka	
2005	The Ringer	Mark	
2006	School for Scoundrels	Classmate	
2009	Blood River	Tri-Pod	
2012	A Thousand Words	Orderly	
2013	The Lone Ranger	Homer	
2014	Faults	Raymond	
2014	Market Hours	Randall	Short
2016	Live Cargo	Doughboy	
2016	Cardboard Boxer	Mike	
2016	Brave New Jersey	Stan Holbrook	
2016	True Memoirs of an International Assassin	Michael Cleveland	

=== Television ===
Year	Title	Role	Notes
2006	My Name Is Earl	George Toolhurst	Episode: "Boogeyman"
2006	Cuts	Mr. Oyindeke/Jeweler	Episode: "The Love Below" & "It's a Ring Thing"
2010	Tracey Ullman's State of the Union	Black Cellmate	Episode: "Episode #3.1"
2010–11	Memphis Beat	Detective Reginald Greenback	Main cast
2011	NCIS	Security Guard Wilson	Episode: "One Last Score"
2011	Shameless	Frank's Co-worker	Episode: "Daddyz Girl"
2013	Legit	Teshawn	Episode: "Anger"
2013	The League	Sky Cap	Episode: "The Bye Week"
2014	Masters of Sex	Leonard	Episode: "Story of My Life"
2016–18	Kevin Can Wait	Tyrone 'Goody' Goodman	Main cast
2021	The Zip Code Plays: Los Angeles	William J. Seymour	Episode: "90026: Echo Park – $10 and a Tambourine"
2021–26	The Upshaws	Davis	Recurring cast
2023	Florida Man	Ray-Ray	Recurring role
