= Barbershop 2: Back in Business =

- Theatrical release poster
- Directed by: Kevin Rodney Sullivan
- Written by: Don D. Scott
- Based on: Characters by Mark Brown
- Produced by: Alex Gartner; Robert Teitel; George Tillman Jr.
- Starring: Ice Cube; Cedric the Entertainer; Sean Patrick Thomas; Eve; Troy Garity; Michael Ealy; Leonard Earl Howze; Harry Lennix; Queen Latifah; Ronnel Taylor
- Cinematography: Tom Priestley Jr.
- Edited by: Patrick Flannery; Paul Seydor
- Music by: Richard Gibbs
- Production companies: Metro-Goldwyn-Mayer Pictures; Cube Vision; State Street Pictures
- Distributed by: MGM Distribution Co. (United States and Canada); 20th Century Fox (International)
- Release date: February 6, 2004
- Running time: 106 minutes
- Country: United States
- Language: English
- Budget: $18–30 million
- Box office: $66 million

Barbershop 2: Back in Business is a 2004 American comedy-drama film directed by Kevin Rodney Sullivan and released by Metro-Goldwyn-Mayer Pictures on February 6, 2004. A sequel to 2002's Barbershop and the second film in the Barbershop film series, also from State Street producing team Robert Teitel and George Tillman Jr., Barbershop 2 deals with the impact of gentrification on the reputation and livelihood of a long-standing Chicago barbershop. Ice Cube, Cedric the Entertainer, Sean Patrick Thomas, Eve, and several more actors reprise their roles from the original film. However, a few of the original film's actors, including Tom Wright and Jazsmin Lewis, return with smaller roles.

Released theatrically by Metro-Goldwyn-Mayer Pictures on February 6, 2004, Barbershop 2 received generally positive reviews from critics and was a box office success, grossing $66 million worldwide against a production budget of $18–30 million.

Barbershop 2 also features what is billed as a "special appearance" by Queen Latifah as Gina Norris, who starred in a spin-off movie, Beauty Shop, which was released in March 2005.

== Plot ==
Since the events of the previous film, Calvin Palmer Jr. has finally settled comfortably into his role as the owner of the Chicago South Side barbershop founded by his late grandfather. The shop's latest threat comes from overzealous developer Quentin Leroux, who opens a rival barbershop across the street called Nappy Cutz.

While Calvin attempts to figure out how to deal with the coming threat of direct competition from Quentin's flashy establishment, his barbers are having their own problems. Isaac, the lone white barber, is now the star of the shop, and begins to feel that he deserves star treatment, feeling neglected by Calvin and the other barbers. Terri is finding success in managing her anger but she has trouble dealing with the growing mutual attraction between Ricky (Michael Ealy) and herself. Dinka is still interested in Terri but is distraught when he finds out that she loves Ricky instead. Jimmy has quit the shop to work for local alderman Lalowe Brown; his replacement, Calvin's cousin Kenard, is fresh out of barber school and horribly inept at cutting hair. Meanwhile, the barbershop and other businesses like it are under threat from gentrification, and Calvin is offered a substantial bribe from both Leroux and Alderman Brown in exchange for his support of the city council's gentrification legislation.

A subplot involves Eddie recalling his time as a young man in the late 1960s, when he first started working at the shop with Calvin's father, including the riots following the assassination of Martin Luther King Jr. Also, Eddie remembers his long-lost love, Loretta (Garcelle Beauvais-Nilon). Eddie and Calvin begin bonding. The film also introduces Calvin's good friend and ex-lover, Gina Norris, who works at the beauty shop next door. The girls at the beauty shop have similar conversations and experiences as the barbers and Gina has a bitter rivalry with Eddie.

After attempting to change his own barbershop's style and decor to match those of his rival, Calvin decides to refuse the bribe money and speak out against the neighborhood's gentrification at the local city council meeting. Though Calvin gives a passionate speech about the legislation helping the region to earn money at the cost of its soul and the community, the council still unanimously votes to approve the legislation and move forward with the project. Despite a mutual attraction, Terri and Ricky agree to remain friends, but not before sharing one last kiss. Dinka still loses out on Terri, but finds love with a stylist at Gina's beauty shop. Though the gentrification project is approved, the community remains loyal to Calvin's barbershop.

== Cast ==
- Ice Cube as Calvin Palmer, Jr.
- Cedric the Entertainer as Eddie Walker
- Sean Patrick Thomas as Jimmy James
- Eve as Terri Jones
- Queen Latifah as Gina Norris
- Troy Garity as Isaac Rosenberg
- Michael Ealy as Ricky Nash
- Leonard Earl Howze as Dinka
- Harry Lennix as Quentin Leroux
- Robert Wisdom as Alderman Lalowe Brown
- Jazsmin Lewis as Jennifer Palmer
- Carl Wright as Checker Fred
- Garcelle Beauvais-Nilon as Loretta
- DeRay Davis as Ray the Hustle Guy
- Kenan Thompson as Kenard
- Tom Wright as Detective Williams
- Keke Palmer as Gina's niece
- Marcia Wright-Tillman as Joyce
- Avant as Dexter

== Reception ==
=== Box office ===
Barbershop 2 opened at #1 with $24,241,612, beating Miracle and You Got Served. The $30 million production would go on to gross $65,111,277 in the domestic box office and $860,036 internationally for a worldwide total of $65,971,313.

=== Critical response ===
On Rotten Tomatoes, the film has an approval rating of 69% based on reviews from 127 critics, with an average rating of 6.30/10. The site's critical consensus reads, "The humor is less sharp and more warm-hearted this time around, and the characters are enjoyable to revisit." On Metacritic, the film has a score of 59 out of 100 based on reviews from 34 critics. Audiences surveyed by CinemaScore gave the film a grade "A−" on scale of A to F.

Roger Ebert of the Chicago Sun-Times wrote: "Did I like the film? Yeah, kinda, but not enough to recommend. The first film arrived with freshness and an unexpected zing, but this one seems too content to follow in its footsteps." Variety's Todd McCarthy called it "A less raucous and more serious-minded neighborhood comedy than its entertaining predecessor."

== Soundtrack ==
A soundtrack containing hip-hop and R&B music was released on February 3, 2004, by Interscope Records. It peaked at #18 on the Billboard 200 and #8 on the Top R&B/Hip-Hop Albums.

== Sequel ==
On March 26, 2014, Deadline Hollywood reported that MGM was in negotiations with Ice Cube to produce a third Barbershop film.

On March 19, 2015, MGM announced that the studio was negotiating with Cedric the Entertainer, Queen Latifah, and Nicki Minaj to appear in the film. Malcolm D. Lee directed and New Line Cinema (via Warner Bros.) distributed the film. It was released on April 15, 2016.
