= Cedric the Entertainer =

American comedian and actor (born 1964)

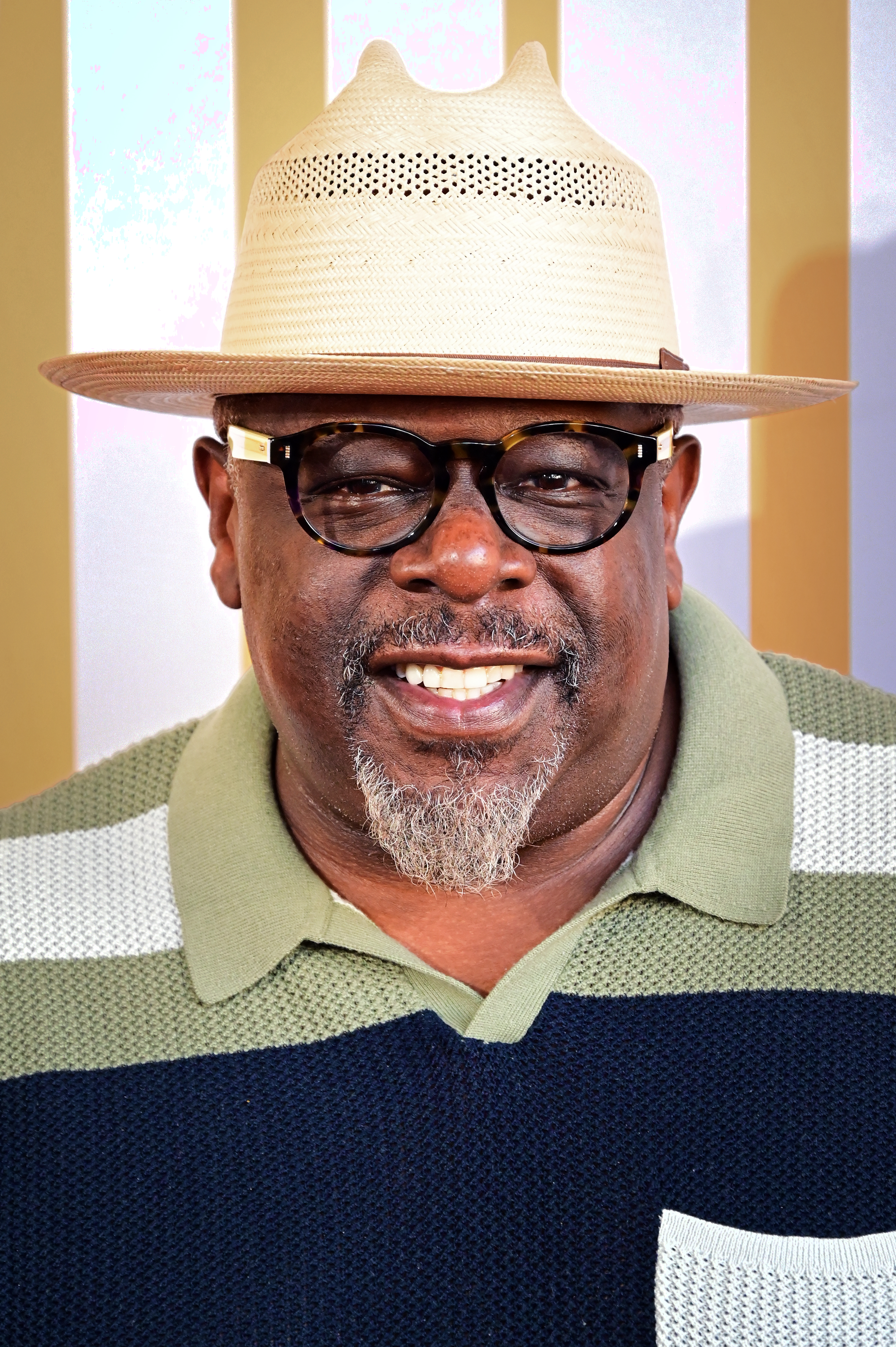
- Cedric in 2026
- Born: Cedric Antonio Kyles; April 24, 1964 (age 62); Jefferson City, Missouri, U.S.
- Education: Southeast Missouri State University (BA)
- Occupations: Comedian; actor; television host; producer
- Years active: 1987–present
- Spouse: Lorna Wells (m. 1999)
- Children: 3
- Awards: Six NAACP Image Awards; One Gotham Award; Star on the Hollywood Walk of Fame

Comedy career
- Genres: Observational comedy, blue comedy, surreal humour, insult comedy
- Subjects: Everyday life, pop culture, self-deprecation
- Website: iamcedric.com

Cedric Antonio Kyles (born April 24, 1964), better known by his stage name Cedric the Entertainer, is an American stand-up comedian, actor, producer, and television host. Beginning in the 1990s, he built a successful career in stand-up comedy, as well as in film, television, and voice acting, earning recognition for his contributions to American comedy and entertainment.

He is best known for co-starring with Steve Harvey on The WB sitcom The Steve Harvey Show, as one of The Original Kings of Comedy, for starring as Eddie Walker in Barbershop and for voicing Maurice in the Madagascar film series. He hosted BET's ComicView during the 1993–1994 season and Def Comedy Jam in 1995. He starred in the TV Land original series The Soul Man, which aired from 2012–16 and hosted the 12th season of the daytime version of Who Wants to Be a Millionaire from 2013–14 . He has also done voice work for Ice Age, Charlotte's Web, Planes and Planes: Fire & Rescue. From 2018 to 2026, he starred on the CBS sitcom The Neighborhood. In 2019, he received a star on the Hollywood Walk of Fame.

== Early life ==
Cedric was born on April 24, 1964, in Jefferson City, Missouri, the son of Rosetta (née Boyce), a schoolteacher, and Kittrell Kyles, an employee of the Missouri Pacific Railroad. He has a younger sister, Sharita Kyles Wilson, a communications professor at Pepperdine University in Malibu, California.

Cedric was raised in Caruthersville, Missouri, but after junior high school he moved to Berkeley, Missouri, a northern suburb of St. Louis. He is a graduate of Berkeley High School.

Cedric majored in mass communication at Southeast Missouri State University and worked as a State Farm Insurance claims adjuster and substitute high school teacher before becoming a full-time comedian. He is a member of Kappa Alpha Psi.

== Career ==
Cedric's stage name came about when he felt that his real name, Cedric Kyles, sounded too formal. Inspired by an entertainer named Kodak, he came up with the name "Cheerio", but received a cease and desist letter from General Mills over their cereal Cheerios. He settled on his stage name when someone introduced him as "an entertainer, Cedric the entertainer" and the name stuck.

After appearing on It's Showtime at the Apollo in 1992, Cedric hosted BET's ComicView during the 1993–1994 season, and Def Comedy Jam in 1995. He then moved into acting, auditioning for and receiving his first-ever role as The Cowardly Lion in the 1995 Apollo Theater Revival of The Wiz. He expanded his career by playing Steve Harvey's friend Cedric Jackie Robinson on The Steve Harvey Show.

While his acting career grew, Cedric continued to perform stand-up comedy and traveled the country as one of the Kings of Comedy headliners with Steve Harvey, D. L. Hughley and Bernie Mac. The act was later made into a Spike Lee film, The Original Kings of Comedy (2000). From 2002-2003, Cedric had his own sketch comedy show, Cedric the Entertainer Presents, but after being renewed for a second season, it was canceled by Fox before the season began. He took time to write a book, Grown-A$$ Man. He appeared in the 2003 video game Tiger Woods PGA Tour 2004. He recorded comedic interludes on two Nelly albums, Country Grammar (2000) and Nellyville (2002) as well as on Jay-Z's The Black Album (2003). A more recent HBO Comedy Special was Cedric The Entertainer: Taking You Higher in 2006. (Note: Two of the background dancers from the special were Kamilah Barrett and Sandra Colton, who were finalists in Fox's So You Think You Can Dance.)

Cedric began appearing in films, including Ride (1998), Big Momma's House (2000), Barbershop (2002), and its sequels Barbershop 2: Back in Business (2004) and Barbershop: The Next Cut (2016), Serving Sara (2002), Intolerable Cruelty (2003), Johnson Family Vacation (2004), Lemony Snicket's A Series of Unfortunate Events (2004), Man of the House (2005) and Be Cool (2005).

He was the subject of controversy when his Barbershop character made unpopular remarks about Martin Luther King Jr. and Rosa Parks. These jokes (about the pastor's promiscuity with women, and Parks just being tired to get to the back of the bus) were spoken in character, as part of the script. Rev. Jesse Jackson publicly asked for those jokes to be edited out of the movie on the DVD and VHS releases.

Cedric also voiced the character of Bobby Proud in the series The Proud Family (2001-2005), and starting in 2022, its revival series The Proud Family: Louder and Prouder, and characters in several films including Zoo Bear #1 in Dr. Dolittle 2 (2001) and Carl in Ice Age (2002). In Madagascar (2005), and its sequels Madagascar: Escape 2 Africa (2008) and Madagascar 3: Europe's Most Wanted (2012), he voiced Maurice, the aye aye. He appeared in the film Charlotte's Web (2006) as the voice of Golly the gander. He also voiced Leadbottom, a biplane in the films Planes (2013), and its sequel Planes: Fire & Rescue (2014).

In October 2005, Cedric joined the Champ Car auto racing series as a part owner. Cedric appeared as the lead comedian at the 2005 White House Correspondents Dinner, but jokingly remarked that he was unprepared because he thought that he would follow a humorous speech by President George W. Bush. He instead followed First Lady Laura Bush, who called him "hilarious" and "probably the funniest person" she had ever met.

In the 2007 comedy film Code Name: The Cleaner, Cedric played Jake, a janitor with amnesia who may be a secret undercover government agent involved in an illegal arms conspiracy. He starred in the 2008 films Welcome Home Roscoe Jenkins and Street Kings.

Cedric has won many awards, beginning with $500 in the Johnny Walker National Comedy Contest in 1990 and coming in first in the Miller Genuine Draft Comedy Contest in 1993. BET named him Richard Pryor Comic of the Year. He has also won four NAACP Awards. He was inducted to the St. Louis Walk of Fame on June 7, 2008. His star is at 6166 Delmar.

He was the special guest host for WWE Raw on September 21, 2009, in Little Rock, Arkansas. During the show, he participated in a wrestling match, defeating Chavo Guerrero Jr. by pinfall. The match also featured Santino Marella as a guest referee. Cedric also got help from an unknown wrestler dubbed The Sledge Hammer (played by Imani Lee) and Hornswoggle.

In March 2010, Cedric made his directorial debut with Dance Fu, produced and funded independently by his company Bird and a Bear Entertainment with producer Eric C. Rhone. It starred comedian Kel Mitchell. Cedric made a cameo appearance in the film as a homicide detective. It was released straight to DVD on October 4, 2011.

Cedric made his Broadway debut in the 2008 revival of David Mamet's play American Buffalo.

In a June 21, 2011, interview, Cedric said his latest reality game show, It's Worth What?, would air on NBC on July 12, 2011, but the start date was delayed by one week to July 19. From 2012-2016, he played the main character in the TV Land original series The Soul Man, featuring Niecy Nash. The series ran for five seasons.

Cedric was the host of the American TV game show Who Wants to Be a Millionaire, beginning with its 12th season in national syndication, which premiered on September 2, 2013. On April 30, 2014, Cedric announced that he was leaving the game show after the 2013–14 season to focus on other projects. Terry Crews took over as host on September 8, 2014.

In 2016, Cedric starred as Lou Dunne in the comedy film Why Him?. Starting in 2018, he played the character of Calvin Butler in the television sitcom The Neighborhood.

He was the official commentator for the Jake Paul vs. Mike Tyson boxing match in 2024.

In 2025, Cedric the Entertainer competed on season thirteen of The Masked Singer as "Honey Pot" where the bees on the mask part of his costume sported his trademark fedoras. He was the first of Group A to be eliminated in the season premiere.

It was announced that Cedric would star in the Broadway revival of Joe Turner's Come and Gone with previews starting on March 30, 2026 and opening night on April 25, 2026. The play was directed by Debbie Allen and co-starred Taraji P. Henson.

== Personal life ==
Cedric is married to Lorna Wells. They have two children, Croix (born 2000) and Lucky Rose (born 2003). He also has a daughter, Tiara (born 1989), from a previous relationship.

He continues his involvement with his high school by awarding a scholarship each year to a graduating senior through the Cedric the Entertainer Charitable Foundation, whose motto is "Reaching Out...Giving Back". In May 2015, he was awarded an honorary doctorate in fine arts and humanities by Lincoln University of Missouri, which was his parents' alma mater. In May 2025, he was awarded another honorary doctorate in fine arts by Southeast Missouri State University, his alma mater. In 2018, St. Louis honored him by renaming the street in front of the Kappa Alpha Psi Alumni House to Cedric The Entertainer Way.

== Filmography ==
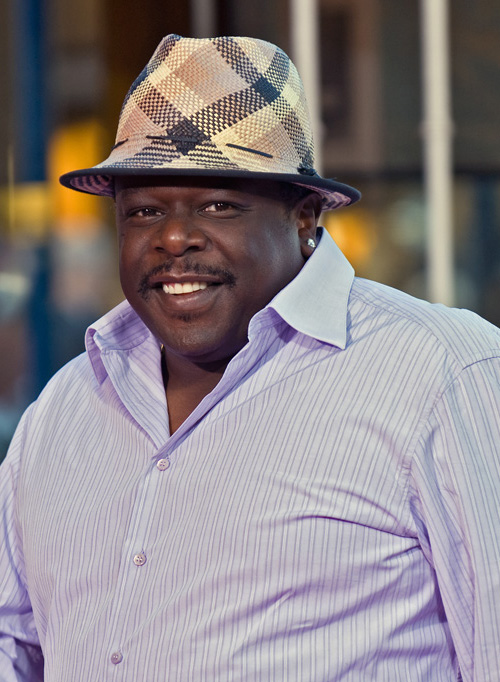
Cedric at the June 2008 premiere of Get Smart

List of film performances
Year	Title	Role	Notes
1998	Ride	Bo	
2000	Big Momma's House	The Reverend	
2000	The Original Kings of Comedy	Himself	Also writer; Documentary
2001	Kingdom Come	Reverend Beverly H. Hooker	
2001	Dr. Dolittle 2	Zoo Bear #1	Voice
2002	Serving Sara	Ray Harris	
2002	Barbershop	Eddie Walker	
2002	Ice Age	Carl	Voice
2003	Intolerable Cruelty	Gus Petch	
2004	Barbershop 2: Back in Business	Eddie Walker	
2004	Johnson Family Vacation	Nate Johnson / Earl Johnson	Also producer
2004	Lemony Snicket's A Series of Unfortunate Events	Constable	
2005	Be Cool	'Sin' LaSalle	
2005	Madagascar	Maurice	Voice
2005	Man of the House	Percy Stevens	
2005	The Honeymooners	Ralph Kramden	Also executive producer
2006	Charlotte's Web	Golly The Gander	Voice
2007	Code Name: The Cleaner	Jake Rogers	Also producer
2007	Talk to Me	Bob "Nighthawk" Terry	
2008	Welcome Home Roscoe Jenkins	Clyde Stubbs	
2008	Street Kings	Winston 'Scribble'	
2008	Madagascar: Escape 2 Africa	Maurice	Voice
2008	Cadillac Records	Willie Dixon	
2009	Un-broke: What You Need To Know About Money	Himself	TV film
2009	Merry Madagascar	Maurice	Voice; TV film
2009	All's Faire in Love	Professor Shockworthy	
2011	Dance Fu	Detective	Also executive producer
2011	Larry Crowne	Lamar	
2012	Madagascar 3: Europe's Most Wanted	Maurice	Voice
2013	A Haunted House	Father Doug Williams	
2013	Madly Madagascar	Maurice	Voice
2013	Planes	Leadbottom	Voice
2014	Planes: Fire & Rescue	Leadbottom	Voice
2014	A Haunted House 2	Father Doug Williams	
2014	Top Five	Jazzy	
2016	Barbershop: The Next Cut	Eddie Walker	
2016	Why Him?	Lou Dunne	
2017	First Reformed	Pastor Joel Jeffers	as Cedric Kyles
2020	Poor Greg Drowning	Narrator	
2020	Son of the South	Reverend Ralph Abernathy	
2020	The Opening Act	Billy 'Billy G'	
2020	SHE BALL	COUNCILMAN	
2022	The Black Karen	Sergeant Warren	Short film
2023	The Plus One	Alfred Anders	
2023	How I Learned to Fly	Louis	
2024	Outlaw Posse	Horatio	
2024	A Hip-Hop Story	The Notorious B.I.G.	
2024	Unfrosted	Stu Smiley	
2026	Swapped	Caloo	Voice
2026	A Proud Family Wizmas	Bobby Proud (voice)	

List of television performances
Year	Title	Role	Notes
1992	It's Showtime at the Apollo	Himself	
1993–1994	ComicView	Himself	Host
1995	Def Comedy Jam	Himself	1 episode
1996–2002	The Steve Harvey Show	Cedric Jackie Robinson	Main role
2001–2005	The Proud Family	Bobby Proud	Voice, 14 episodes
2002–2003	Cedric the Entertainer Presents	Himself	Main role
2004	Eve	Himself	Episode: "Porn Free"
2006	Wild 'n Out	Himself	Episode: "Cedric the Entertainer"
2006	All of Us	Clarence DeWitt	Episode: "Pass the Peas"
2007	The Boondocks	Cousin Jericho Freeman	Voice, episode: "Invasion of the Katrinians"
2009	WWE Raw	Himself	Special guest host, 1 episode
2011	It's Worth What?	Himself	Host
2011	Take Two with Phineas and Ferb	Himself	Episode: "Cedric the Entertainer"
2011, 2014	Hot in Cleveland	Reverend Boyce Ballentine	Episodes: "Bridezelka" and "Stayin' Alive"
2012–2016	The Soul Man	Reverend Boyce Ballentine	Main role, 54 episodes
2012	2 Broke Girls	Darius	Episode: "And the Pre-Approved Credit Card"
2013	Real Husbands of Hollywood	Himself	Episode: "Blackstabbers"
2013–2014	Who Wants to Be a Millionaire	Himself	Host
2015, 2020	Whose Line Is It Anyway?	Himself	Season 11 Episode 1, Season 16
2015	Cedric's Barber Battle	Himself	Host
2016	Another Period	Scott Joplin	Episode: "Joplin"
2017	Master of None	Kenny 'The Magnificent'	Episode: "Door #3"
2017	Drop the Mic	Himself	Episode: "Niecy Nash vs. Cedric the Entertainer / Liam Payne vs. Jason Derulo"
2017	Nightcap	Himself	Episode: "Spinster Code"
2017	The Comedy Get Down	Himself	Main role
2017	Superior Donuts	Reggie Wicks	2 episodes
2017	Funny You Should Ask	Himself	4 episodes
2018–2020	The Last O.G.	Miniard Mullins	Main cast
2018–2021	Summer Camp Island	The Moon	Voice, 11 episodes
2018–2026	The Neighborhood	Calvin Butler	Main role; also executive producer
2018	Black-ish	'Smokey'	2 episodes
2018	Nobodies	Himself	2 episodes
2019–2020	Power	Croop	3 episodes
2020–present	The Greatest #AtHome Videos	Himself	Host
2020	Woke	Trashcan	Voice, 3 episodes
2021	73rd Primetime Emmy Awards	Himself (host)	Television special
2022–2026	The Proud Family: Louder and Prouder	Bobby Proud	Voice
2023	The Daily Show	Himself (guest)	Episode: April 5
2024	John Mulaney Presents: Everybody's in LA	Himself	Episode: "Earthquakes"
2025	The Masked Singer	Himself/Honeypot	Season 13 contestant

== Books ==
- Grown-A$$ Man, Ballantine Books, 2002. ISBN 978-0345447784
- Flipping Boxcars: A Novel (with Alan Eisenstock), Amistad, 2023. ISBN 978-0063258990
