= Friday (franchise) =

American comedy film series

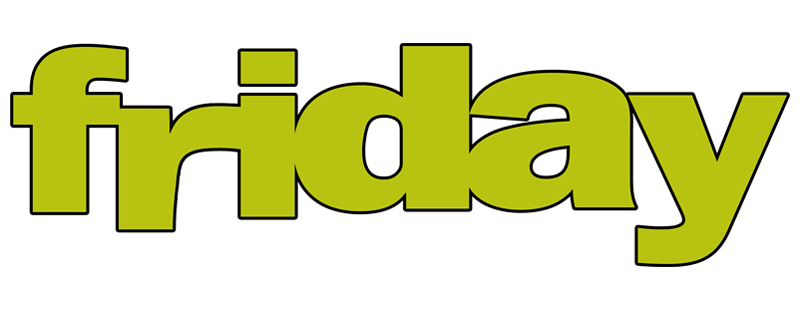
- Official franchise logo
- Created by: Ice Cube; DJ Pooh
- Owner: New Line Cinema (Warner Bros. Entertainment)
- Years: 1995–present

Films and television
- Films: Friday (1995); Next Friday (2000); Friday After Next (2002)
- Animated series: Friday: The Animated Series (2007)

Audio
- Soundtracks: Friday; Next Friday; Friday After Next

The Friday franchise consists of American stoner buddy-comedies created by Ice Cube and DJ Pooh; including three theatrical films and one animated spin-off TV series. The series takes place in South Central Los Angeles and follows the exploits of perpetually unemployed Craig Jones, who, along with his friends and relatives, is thrust into various dilemmas that happen to occur on a Friday.

Three films have been released. The first film, Friday (1995), was a sleeper hit and has garnered a large cult following. The film's success led to two sequels, Next Friday (2000) and Friday After Next (2002), which were also box office successes. Friday: The Animated Series based on the films debuted in 2007 on MTV2 and lasted 8 episodes. Ice Cube and John Witherspoon were the only actors to have appeared in all three films. A fourth installment titled Last Friday is in development.

== Films ==
| Film | U.S. release date | Director | Screenwriter(s) | Story by | Producer(s) |
|---|---|---|---|---|---|
| Friday | April 26, 1995 | F. Gary Gray | Ice Cube & DJ Pooh | Ice Cube & DJ Pooh | Patricia Charbonnet |
| Next Friday | January 12, 2000 | Steve Carr | Ice Cube | Ice Cube | Ice Cube |
| Friday After Next | November 22, 2002 | Marcus Raboy | Ice Cube | Ice Cube | Ice Cube and Matt Alvarez |
| Last Friday | TBA | Lawrence Lamont | Ice Cube, DJ Pooh & Aaron McGruder | Ice Cube, DJ Pooh & Aaron McGruder | Ice Cube & Michael Gruber |

=== Friday (1995) ===
The film takes a look at one single Friday in the life of two friends, Craig Jones (Ice Cube) and Smokey (Chris Tucker), in South Central LA. Craig has recently been fired from his job while attempting to collect his wages, as he was allegedly caught on camera stealing cardboard boxes from UPS, although he claims innocence. Throughout the day, friends and local neighborhood characters pass through, including the hulking neighborhood bully Deebo (Tommy Lister Jr.) and interactions with Craig's father Willie (John Witherspoon), his mother Betty (Anna Maria Horsford), and sister Dana (Regina King). The film's subplot focuses on drug dealer Big Worm (Faizon Love), who warns Craig and Smokey to collect $200 worth of marijuana they smoked (which was supposed to be sold) no later than 10:00 that evening, or Craig and Smokey will be killed.

In the end, Craig manages to overcome all of the day's tribulations, save for finding employment; he and Smokey are able to pay Big Worm, he confronts Deebo and successfully beats him after all of his bullying to everyone else, and he and his pretty neighbor Debbie (Nia Long) hook up.

=== Next Friday (2000) ===
Next Friday is a 2000 stoner comedy film, and the sequel to the 1995 film Friday. This is the first film to be produced by Ice Cube's film production company Cube Vision. The film is directed by Steve Carr, and stars Ice Cube, Mike Epps, Don Curry, John Witherspoon, and Tommy "Tiny" Lister Jr.

In the sequel, Deebo has sworn revenge against Craig for beating him up and putting him in jail for four years. He is joined by his little brother Tyrone (Sticky Fingaz) whom he escaped jail with. Craig's father, Willie decides to send him up to Rancho Cucamonga and live with his uncle's family until Deebo is back in jail. It's there, he learns about the financial problems that his cousin Day-Day (Mike Epps) and his father Elroy (Don Curry) face. He is also informed by their Korean neighbor, Mrs. Ho-Kim (Amy Hill) with the problems of Karla's older brothers: Joker (Jacob Vargas), Lil' Joker (Lobo Sebastian) and Baby Joker (Rolando Molina). When Craig learns about the drug money hidden in a pipe kept in Joker's room, Craig conspires with Day-Day and Roach to steal it so they can use the money to pay off the debts.

=== Friday After Next (2002) ===
One year has passed since the events of the last film. At 3:37 AM on Christmas Eve, Craig and Day-Day are robbed by a fake Santa Claus (Rickey Smiley) as he stole their presents, Craig's CD collection, Day-Day's baby pictures, and a big sandwich. Craig and Day-Day get jobs as rent-a-cops in a strip mall where Willie and Elroy opened up a rib joint called "Bros. BBQ". They owe rent to their apartment landlady Ms. Pearly (BeBe Drake) who threatens the two with the attentions of her burly gay ex-con son Damon Pearly (Terry Crews). Craig is in love with Donna (K.D. Aubert), the girlfriend of a pimp named Money Mike (Katt Williams) who treats her poorly. Craig and Day-Day throw a rent party to get the money for Ms. Pearly while also subduing the fake Santa Claus.

=== Last Friday (TBA) ===
According to John Witherspoon, the fourth and final installment of the series has been greenlit as of April 2017. DJ Pooh revealed in an interview on Drink Champs that he was working on Last Friday with Ice Cube. As of April 2018, Cube stated "Right now we're still writing the movie, making sure that's ahead of the curve and not behind the curve. But I believe we'll start shooting, hopefully by the end of this year." In May 2018, Mike Epps posted a video and image on Instagram with Cube, teasing fans, and they assumed that the film is in production.

On April 29, 2019, Cube stated that the script has been completed, and hopes for it to be released on the 25th anniversary of the original film, which was in 2020. "We are pushing for it, we finished the script, we are getting notes from the studio and it's going back and forth," Cube said. "Get into pre-production and start hiring. It would be nice for this to come out on the 25th anniversary." On June 21, Cube stated that the movie is coming and he's currently doing a rewrite with DJ Pooh. Four months later, on October 29, John Witherspoon died, which leaves the fate of his character unknown. On November 14, Cube blamed New Line Cinema for not committing to getting the film made while Witherspoon was alive. Ever since Witherspoon's death, Ice Cube stated that the film was currently on hold although he hopes to get it back on track in the near future.

On December 19, 2020, in the wake of Tommy Lister Jr.'s death, Angela Means claimed on a podcast that the project was cancelled. Cube criticized Warner Bros. for not continuing the franchise, and New Line Cinema for not devoting themselves to the film's production stating "You let our legends die". A day later, on December 20, Clifton Powell expressed hope that the film would still be in production and that it will include a tribute to John Witherspoon and Tommy Lister Jr.

On May 7, 2021, Cube opened up about two potential scripts he had written for the film. The first one would have focused on Craig and Day-Day trying to survive in prison after having their Cannabis Dispensary stolen by a Flash mob. They both would have then found themselves in a Rehabilitation hospital run by Smokey. Cube did not give any precise details on the second script, although, he stated it would have focused around a love story.

On October 1, 2022, in an episode with Drink Champs, Cube revealed Warner Bros., who owns the distribution rights of the film series, had rejected the scripts, citing creative differences, and while Tucker previously stated he is not committed to return for the film, Cube remains in good relations with him.

On June 22, 2024, on Flavor Flav's show Flavor of the Week, Cube announced that production of Last Friday was going smoothly at Warner Bros., stating that they finally got some traction.

On November 13, 2025, Cube announced that Aaron McGruder had signed on as co-writer of the film with him.

On May 18, 2026, Cube and Epps officially announced that Last Friday was in development, with production to begin late that same year and Chris Tucker in talks to return as Smokey. On June 18, on Entertainment Tonight, Cube and Epps revealed the plot would center around gentrification and community preservation in South Central. In October 2026, Lawrence Lamont was announced as director.

== Television ==
Friday: The Animated Series (2007)

Friday
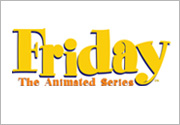
- Genre: Comedy
- Created by: Ice Cube
- Based on: Friday by Ice Cube; DJ Pooh
- Developed by: Jay Dyer
- Presented by: New Line Television
- Voices of: Khary Payton; Phil LaMarr; John DiMaggio; Cree Summer; Masasa Moyo; Beth Payne; Kevin Michael Richardson; Reno Wilson; Chris Edgerly
- Composer: Jared Faber
- Country of origin: United States
- Original language: English
- No. of seasons: 1
- No. of episodes: 8

Production
- Executive producers: Ice Cube; Matt Alvarez; Jay Dyer; Tony DiSanto; Lori Huck
- Producers: Jim Rosenthal; Chris Linn; John Hayes
- Running time: 18-22 minutes (Not including commercials)
- Production companies: New Line Television; Cube Vision; MTV Animation

Original release
- Network: MTV2
- Release: June 24 – July 8, 2007

An animated series titled Friday: The Animated Series aired on MTV2 in 2007.

Just like the original films' setting, the series takes place in a modern South Central Los Angeles. Most of the characters from the films are in the series, but they are not voiced by their respective actors. However, they are voiced by veteran voice actors. Ice Cube, who played Craig Jones in the films, served as the series' executive producer. Khary Payton served as Jones' voice actor.

Image Entertainment released The Complete Series on DVD in Region 1 on December 8, 2009.

=== Voice cast ===
- Khary Payton as Craig Jones
- Phil LaMarr as Smokey, Stanley, Joann, Pinky, Money Mike, Uncle Elroy Jones, Additional Voices
- John DiMaggio as Willie "Pops" Jones, Mayor, Additional Voices
- Cree Summer as Betty "Mom" Jones, Dana Jones, Infant Craig, Additional Voices
- Beth Payne
- Kevin Michael Richardson as Deebo, Additional voices
- Reno Wilson as Ezal
- Chris Edgerly

=== Crew ===
- Ice Cube - Executive Producer
- Jack Fletcher - Casting and Voice Director

=== Episodes ===
| No. | Title | Original release date |
|---|---|---|
| 1 | "Hardly Working" | June 24, 2007 |
Willie kicks Craig out of the house until he gets a job. He is unable to find one and sleeps on the streets where he is arrested for the kidnapping of a white girl.
| 2 | "Notorious T.R.E.E." | June 26, 2007 |
Craig and Smokey see the image of a legendary slain rapper in a tree knot and it becomes a neighborhood shrine. But once money gets involved, the guys start a hip-hop feud of their own.
| 3 | "Go With the Flow" | June 28, 2007 |
Old pipes cause a massive flood in the neighborhood, forcing everyone to flee to the safety of the R. Kelly Youth Center where Willie enlists Deebo to help keep the peace. Craig and Smokey look for help, but instead find a conspiracy that reaches the highest levels of city government as the Mayor won't lend aid to the trapped people. So they use a local news anchor to publicly expose the problems with the help of their neighbors and Deebo. The Mayor, having seen the news and fearing repercussions from the governor in not helping his city, decides to pull the lever and drain the flood while firing a City Hall janitor that he makes his scapegoat.
| 4 | "Experience the Happy" | June 30, 2007 |
Craig and Willie join the big brother program and are forced to mentor Smokey and Deebo as their "little brothers". When Deebo begins to go soft, the neighborhood starts to fall apart and Craig is needed to teach Deebo what it means to be a neighborhood bully. Meanwhile, Smokey gets Willie in trouble when he sneaks in some marijuana hidden in a bud brownie.
| 5 | "When Craig Met Condi" | July 2, 2007 |
Craig has a fling with Condoleezza Rice when she flees the pressure of her office and hides out in the hood. Later, Craig finds out that breaking up with the most powerful woman in the world is hard to do.
| 6 | "The Spirit of 420" | July 4, 2007 |
Smokey wants to celebrate his and Craig's favorite holiday, April 20th. Only problem is that Craig got a job working for his Uncle Elroy (whom Willie obviously can't stand) at his successful BBQ restaurant and doesn't want to celebrate anymore. After being disgraced, Smokey is shown his past, present, and future in a parody of A Christmas Carol from his future self in order to save Craig from a miserable, unhappy marriage with his gold-digger wife in Rancho Cucamonga. When Smokey comes to and after stopping Ezal from stealing his pants, he tricks Willie into thinking that Elroy bragged about his humiliating endeavors in front of his customers at Bros' BBQ, which leads to a confrontation between the two brothers. Humiliated by both his father's and uncle's behavior, Craig quits his job leaving them to clean up their mess and returns home to celebrate his favorite holiday with Smokey.
| 7 | "Great Moments in Black History" | July 6, 2007 |
Willie is determined to teach Craig and Smokey about some of the little known moments in black history.
| 8 | "Uncle Craig's Cabin'" | July 8, 2007 |
In the series finale, Craig and Smokey agree to take over Willie's dog-catching route for a day to try and catch the famed El Diablo. They wind up instead, picking strawberries with immigrants. When Craig and Smokey return from the farm to finish the job, they find El Diablo. In the truck, they discover that El Diablo is a mother trying to raise her pups. Craig and Smokey decide to let her go and give Willie a replacement dog who looks like Diablo herself.

== Cast and characters ==
List indicators

This section includes characters who will appear or have appeared in the franchise.

- An empty grey cell indicates the character was not in the film, or that the character's official presence has not yet been confirmed.
- ^{A} indicates an appearance through archival footage or audio.
- ^{V} indicates a voice-only role.
- ^{Y} indicates a younger version of the character.

| Characters | Films | | | Television |
| Characters | Friday | Next Friday | Friday After Next | Friday: The Animated Series |
Principal characters
| Craig Jones | Ice Cube | Ice Cube | Ice Cube | Khary Payton^{V} |
| Craig Jones | Ice Cube | Ice Cube | Ice Cube | Cree Summer^{Y}^{V} |
| Mr. William "Willie" Jones | John Witherspoon | John Witherspoon | John Witherspoon | John DiMaggio^{V} |
| Deebo | Tommy Lister Jr. | Tommy Lister Jr. | | Kevin Michael Richardson^{V} |
| Clarence "Smokey" | Chris Tucker | Chris Tucker^{A} | | Phil LaMarr^{V} |
| Daymond "Day-Day" Jones | | Mike Epps | Mike Epps | |
Supporting characters
| Stanley | Ronn Riser | Ronn Riser | | Phil LaMarr^{V} |
| Debbie | Nia Long | | | |
| Mrs. Betty Jones | Anna Maria Horsford | Anna Maria Horsford^{A} | Anna Maria Horsford | Cree Summer^{V} |
| Dana Jones | Regina King | | | Cree Summer^{V} |
| Big Worm | Faizon Love | Faizon Love^{A} | | |
| Pastor Clever | Bernie Mac | | | |
| Red | DJ Pooh | DJ Pooh^{A} | | |
| Mrs. Parker | Kathleen Bradley | | | |
| Mr. Parker | Tony Cox | Tony Cox^{A} | | |
| Joann | Vickilyn Reynolds | Vickilyn Reynolds^{A} | | Phil LaMarr^{V} |
| Ezal | Anthony Johnson | Anthony Johnson^{A} | | Reno Wilson^{V} |
| Joi | Paula Jai Parker | | | |
| Felisha Parker | Angela Means | | | |
| Hector | Demetrius Navarro | | | |
| Lil Chris | Jason Bose Smith | | | |
| Uncle Elroy Jones | | Don "D.C." Curry | Don "D.C." Curry | Phil LaMarr^{V} |
| Pinky | | Clifton Powell | Clifton Powell | Phil LaMarr^{V} |
| Joker | | Jacob Vargas | | |
| Karla | | Lisa Rodriguez | | |
| Roach | | Justin Pierce | | |
| Tyrone | | Kirk Jones | | |
| Auntie Suga | | Kym Whitley | | |
| Lil Joker | | Lobo Sebastian | | Silent cameo |
| Baby Joker | | Rolando Molina | | Silent cameo |
| D'wana | | Tamala Jones | | |
| Baby D' | | Robin Allen | | |
| Money Mike | | | Katt Williams | Phil LaMarr^{V} |
| Donna | | | K.D. Aubert | |
| Damon Pearly | | | Terry Crews | |
| Mrs. Pearly | | | Bebe Drake | |
| Robber Santa Claus | | | Rickey Smiley | Silent cameo |
| Moly | | | Maz Jobrani | Silent cameo |
| Officer Brian Dix | | | Reggie Gaskins | |
| Officer Alvin Hole | | | Joel McKinnon Miller | |
| Big Mary | | | | Masasa Moyo^{V} |

== Additional production and crew details ==
| Film | Crew/Detail | | | | | |
| Film | Composer(s) | Cinematographer | Editor | Production companies | Distributing company | Running time |
|---|---|---|---|---|---|---|
| Friday | Frank Fitzpatrick & Hidden Faces | Gerry Lively | John Carter | New Line Productions, Cube Vision | New Line Cinema | 1 hr 31 mins |
| Next Friday | Terence Blanchard | Christopher J. Baffa | Elena Maganini | New Line Cinema, Cube Vision | New Line Cinema | 1 hr 38 mins |
| Friday After Next | John Murphy | Glen MacPherson | Suzanne Hines | New Line Cinema, Cube Vision, Avery Pix | New Line Cinema | 1 hr 25 mins |
| Friday: The Animated Series | Jared Faber | Directors of animation: Kevin Lofton & Jim Manocchio | David Burger | New Line Television, Cube Vision, MTV Animation | MTV2 | 2 hrs 38 mins |
