= First Sunday =

- Theatrical release poster
- Directed by: David E. Talbert
- Written by: David E. Talbert
- Produced by: David E. Talbert; Ice Cube; Matt Alvarez; David McIlvain; Tim Story
- Starring: Ice Cube; Katt Williams; Tracy Morgan; Loretta Devine; Michael Beach; Keith David; Regina Hall; Malinda Williams; Chi McBride
- Cinematography: Alan Caso
- Edited by: Jeffrey Wolf
- Music by: Stanley Clarke
- Production companies: Screen Gems; Cube Vision; Story Company; Firm Films
- Distributed by: Sony Pictures Releasing
- Release date: January 11, 2008
- Running time: 106 minutes
- Country: United States
- Language: English
- Budget: $20 million
- Box office: $39.8 million

First Sunday is a 2008 American crime comedy film written, produced and directed by David E. Talbert. Starring Ice Cube (who also produced), Katt Williams and Tracy Morgan, the film follows a pair of criminal friends who plan on robbing a local church. The film reunited Cube, Williams, Rickey Smiley, and Clifton Powell all of whom starred in the film Friday After Next six years prior, though it is not related to the Friday franchise.

Released theatrically by Sony Pictures on January 11, 2008, First Sunday received generally negative reviews and grossed $38 million worldwide.

== Plot ==
Best friends, Durell Washington and LeeJohn Jackson are bumbling petty criminals in Baltimore. Having started to work at a repair shop, Durrell impresses the owner with his technology skills. However, LeeJohn ruins this by trying to steal a television. Durell attempts to stop him but when the owner walks in, he believes they are carrying out the TV, getting them fired again.

They struggle to find another stable job due to their records. Durell's ex Omunique is also threatening to move to Atlanta with their son, Durell Jr., unless he helps her pay her lease on her hair salon. Desperate for money, Durell and LeeJohn agree to sell wheelchairs provided by con man Blahka, but they lose them in a police chase.

Sentenced to 5,000 hours of community service, Durell and LeeJohn are threatened by Blahka to pay him $12,000 within 1 day or he will kill them. Durell, however, does not care about Blakha and for a while, ignores LeeJohn, declaring himself done with criminal acts, though he eventually gives in and speaks to him when he keeps annoying him.

After a failed business deal with Mordecai, a massage parlor owner, LeeJohn comes up with a desperate scheme to rob the local church. Durell reluctantly agrees. Entering the church's office, they find several church members, including Pastor Arthur Mitchell, his daughter Tianna, and the choir, led by Ricky, and the Deacon, the latter of whom the rest are arguing with about possibly moving the church elsewhere due to low funds.

Durell announces that he is taking them hostage. After the church members scoff at Durell's insistence, he fires a gun into the air to get their attention. However, the money has already been stolen. Enraged, Durell and LeeJohn hold them hostage until the money turns up. Durell interrogates everyone about the money's whereabouts.

The police pass by, and Durell orders Ricky to talk to them, to assure them the situation is okay. The church is hot so Durell goes to fix the broken air conditioner, while LeeJohn watches over the hostages. To LeeJohn's bewilderment, sister Doris begins cooking for everyone, using the church kitchen. She gives him a plate, and fondly remembers how her husband loved her cooking on his birthday. He expresses his sadness at never having had a birthday, and is comforted by her.

Tianna warms to Durell and questions his motives, until they finally get the air-conditioning going. He then orders everyone back to the lobby. The blind, deaf janitor finds the missing money. Durell receives a phone call from his son, which he is ashamed to answer. Momma T then asks for Durell's purpose for the robbery. When he says he is doing it for his son, Momma T rejects this, insisting Durell is doing it for himself, and is blaming everyone but who is responsible.

Leejohn and Durell give up the robbery, dropping the money. Unfortunately, cops have surrounded the church. Pastor Mitchell tells them to escape out the back, but they are caught in a chase. At their trial, which the entire church attends, the Deacon says they have been accused of stealing $64,000. But this is almost twice the amount he said was collected, putting him at question. The case is dismissed after no one stands when witnesses are called. Durell goes back to Omunique's apartment, where he faces Blahka and his goons.

After explaining his situation, they allow Durell to go and get his son. Omunique opens the door, yelling at Durell, asking him where the money left on her step came from. The church gave her the money as a gift. He begs her not to take his son away. She responds they will stay. Durell is closer to his ex-wife and son, while LeeJohn remains close to Doris and Timothy. The remaining money is used to restore the community and the church sets up a block party to celebrate.

== Cast ==
- Ice Cube as Durell Washington Sr.
- Katt Williams as Ricky
- Tracy Morgan as LeeJohn James Jacob Jackson
- Loretta Devine as Sister Doris
- Michael Beach as the Deacon
- Keith David as Judge B. Bennett Galloway
- Regina Hall as Omunique Washington
- Malinda Williams as Tianna Mitchell
- Chi McBride as Pastor Arthur Mitchell
- Clifton Powell as Officer Eddie King
- Nicholas Turturro as Officer D'Agostino
- Olivia Cole as Momma T
- Starletta DuPois as Grandmother
- Red Grant as Harold
- Retta as Roberta
- C.J. Sanders as Durell Washington Jr.
- Rickey Smiley as Bernice Jenkins
- Arjay Smith as Preston
- Kim Staunton as Public Defender
- Sterling D. Ardrey as Timmy
- P. J. Byrne as Assistant D.A.
- Paul Campbell as Blahka
- Tiffany Pollard as Omunique's Client
- Jasmine Masters as Mordecai

== Reception ==
On review aggregator Rotten Tomatoes, the film holds an approval rating of 12% based on 76 reviews, with an average rating of 3.80/10. The website's critics consensus reads, "First Sunday may have its heart in the right place, but its funny bone is dislocated." Metacritic reported the film had an average score of 41 out of 100, based on 21 reviews, indicating "mixed or average" reviews. Audiences polled by CinemaScore on the opening weekend, gave the film an average grade of "A−" on an A+ to F scale.

=== Box office ===
The film opened at #2 at the box office, behind The Bucket List, with $17,714,821 with an average of $8,004 from 2,213 theaters. When First Sunday closed on February 24, 2008, the film has grossed $37,931,869 from the North American box office and $844,216 in the international box office adding to $38,776,085 worldwide. It grossed more than $100,000 in only four regions outside of the United States, including South Africa ($189,960), the United Kingdom and Ireland ($152,372), Kuwait ($129,332) and the United Arab Emirates ($101,412).

== Release ==
The film was released on January 11, 2008 in the United States.

== Home media ==
The film was released on DVD, UMD and Blu-ray on May 6, 2008.
