= Bye, Felicia =

Popular phrase from the movie Friday

In American English, the phrase "Bye, Felicia" or "Bye, Felisha" is an informal phrase and internet meme intended as a dismissive send-off, which originated in the 1995 film Friday. According to Ice Cube, who starred in Friday and co-wrote its script, "'Bye, Felicia' [...] is the phrase to get anyone out [of] your face that's saying something stupid". Nicole Richie said "Felicia is, like, some random (Note: See noun definition #4 on Wiktionary: "An undefined, unknown or unimportant person.; a person of no consequence.") that you just do not even care about."

== Origin ==
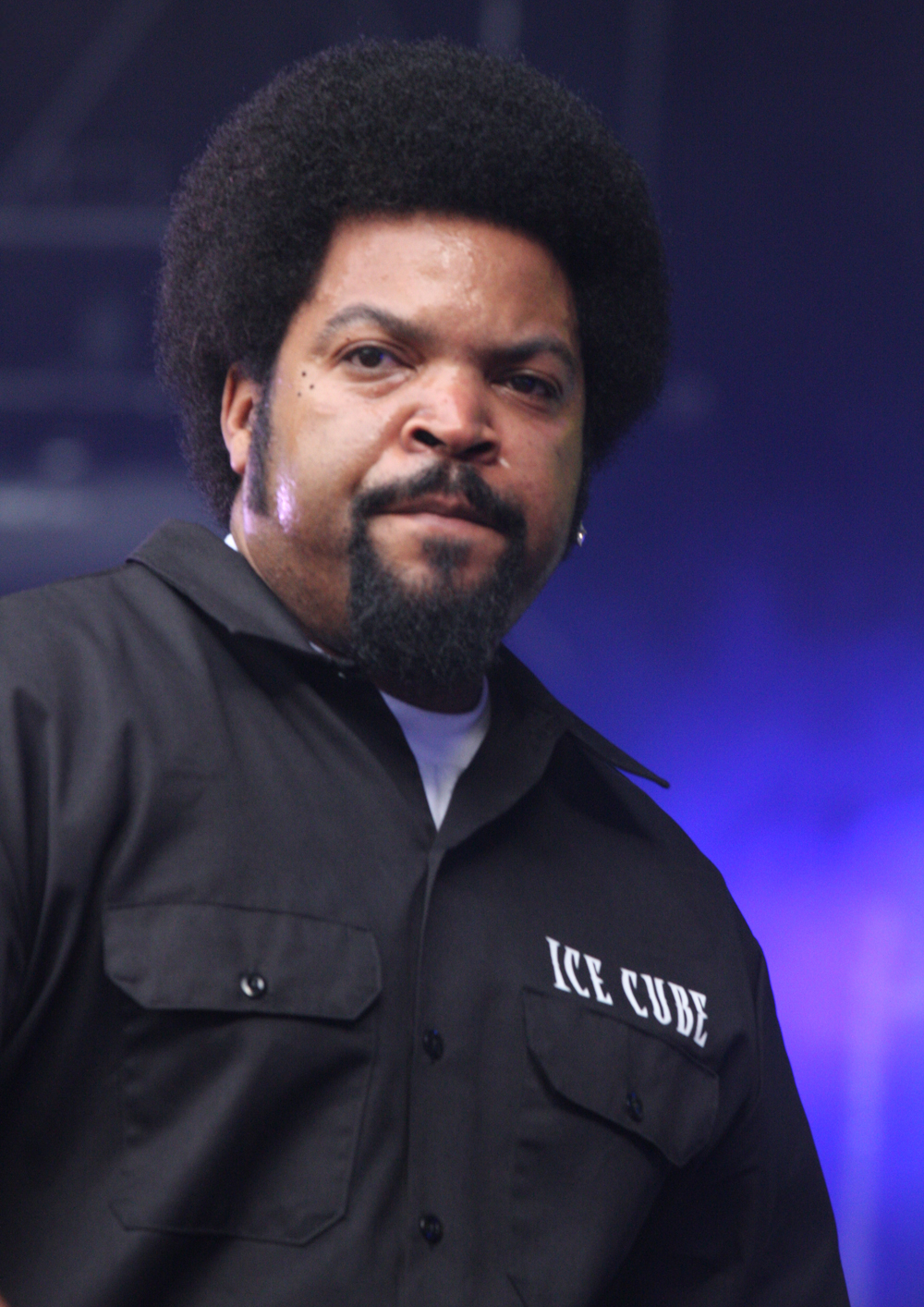
Ice Cube (pictured in 2012) starred in and co-wrote the script for the 1995 film Friday, in which the phrase originated.

The phrase originally comes from a scene in the 1995 American comedy film Friday. The supporting character Felisha (Angela Means) is depicted as a pest who bothers lead characters Smokey and Craig (Chris Tucker and Ice Cube, respectively). She asks to borrow Smokey's car and then begs to share any marijuana he has, but is rebuffed by both men. Craig dismisses her with the phrase "Bye, Felisha" which is intended to end the conversation. Due to the phrase being spread verbally, it was incorrectly recorded as "Bye Felicia", now the most popular variation.

In an interview with Vibe magazine to commemorate the film's 20th anniversary, Means said she believes the phrase was not in the script and Ice Cube ad-libbed the line "based off what I gave him as an actor."

== Rise in popularity ==
According to Robert Thompson, a media professor at Syracuse University, the phrase went relatively unnoticed at first and it was regarded as a "throw-away line." He suggested that it only became popular with the advent of social media and YouTube. On Google, "bye felicia" first began to grow in popularity as a search term around August 2012 and peaked in September 2015. The phrase has been gradually dwindling in popularity as a search term ever since, although it had a brief resurgence in December 2017. According to the website Know Your Meme, the hashtag "#ByeFelicia" was used over 35,000 times in August 2014.

In 2009, the phrase entered the lexicon of the LGBT community due to its usage on RuPaul's Drag Race, an American reality competition television series.

== Usage in popular culture ==
In 2014, VH1 launched a reality show titled Bye Felicia starring Missy Young and Deborah Hawkes. Each episode sees Young and Hawkes give a young woman a makeover and help them "say goodbye for good to their inner 'Felicia.'"

In the 2015 movie Straight Outta Compton, Ice Cube (played by his son, O'Shea Jackson Jr.) said, "Bye, Felicia!", while throwing a girl named Felicia out of his hotel room. Naming the character Felicia was not an intentional reference to Friday, but when Jackson ad-libbed the line as a "coincidental joke", the filmmakers decided to keep it in the film.

In the third book of Pierce Brown's popular Red Rising series, Morning Star, a bodyguard steps forward and begins a monologue with "My name is Felicia au…" but is quickly decapitated and the woman taking her head replies, "Bye Felicia."

The phrase was also used by Jesse Gemstone, played by Danny McBride, on the first episode of the second season of the HBO American television series The Righteous Gemstones during a heated exchange with his siblings, Judy and Kelvin, to which they responded "Bye Felicia to you, Jesse" and "Who's Felicia?"

The phrase has also been used by numerous celebrities. Some examples include:

- Musical artist Jordin Sparks referenced the phrase in the title of her first mixtape #ByeFelicia.
- On an episode of On Air with Ryan Seacrest, guest Nicole Richie informed Seacrest about the phrase and its origins.
- Robin Roberts, one of the hosts of Good Morning America, directed the phrase towards Omarosa Manigault after she resigned as adviser to President Donald Trump.
- Keith Olbermann regularly used the phrase on his eponymous show on ESPN, and often uses the term on Twitter as a means of ending a conversation.
- Alabama congressman Barry Moore abruptly left a town hall meeting in Daphne, Alabama after being heckled by his constituents. As he walked out the door, an audience member is heard to shout, "Bye, Felicia!"

== Criticism ==
In an interview with NPR, Black writer Allison Davis talked about the phrase's usage in the 2015 film Straight Outta Compton, which is a fictionalized version of Ice Cube's early career with the pioneering rap group N.W.A. Davis says director Gary Gray unnecessarily added a "misogynistic moment for a punchline" with a scene featuring a female character that references the "Bye, Felicia" scene from Friday. Davis believes the 2015 scene was "kind of disturbing" and "slut-shaming," and was particularly critical of the decision to show the character Felicia as a "the harlot troublemaker," and punish her by kicking her out of a party naked.

Writing for the online magazine The Root, Dustin J. Seibert, a Black writer, states his point of view that the phrase was originally created by Black people and meant to be used by Black people. According to him, "white people co-opted the phrase and stunk it up [...] Hit up the former Twitter right now and type "Bye Felicia" in the search bar…you'll see it's not us using it like that anymore." He specifically mentioned Keith Olbermann as someone who co-opted and "stunk up" the term. Similarly, Monique Judge of theGrio, who is also Black, agrees Olbermann overused the phrase, and cites him as an example of "white people stealing a phrase with significant meaning for Black people."

== See also ==
- Bye Felipe
