= Steve Carr =

American film producer (born 1965)

- Born: Steven Harold Carr; April 7, 1965 (age 61); Brooklyn, New York, U.S.
- Occupations: Film director; producer; music video director
- Years active: 1995–present
- Notable work: Next Friday; Dr. Dolittle 2 Daddy Day Care; Paul Blart: Mall Cop
- Website: Official Website

Steven Harold Carr (born April 7, 1965) is an American film director, music video director, and film producer from Brooklyn, New York. After studying fine arts on a full scholarship to Manhattan’s School of Visual Arts, Carr founded design firm The Drawing Board with Cey Adams to create iconic album artwork for Def Jam Recordings artists such as Beastie Boys, Public Enemy, LL Cool J and more. Asked to take his vision to film, Carr created groundbreaking videos for influential hip-hop artists from Slick Rick to Jay-Z, and was signed to Quentin Tarantino's A Band Apart music video production company in Los Angeles, CA.

Carr made his feature film directorial debut with the comedy Next Friday in 2000. He subsequently directed many box office hits in the 2000s including Dr. Dolittle 2, Daddy Day Care, and Paul Blart: Mall Cop.

== Career ==
Shortly after graduating from SVA, Carr convinced Russell Simmons to let him design all the album covers at Def Jam Records. Carr began directing music videos including Jay-Z's "Hard Knock Life (Ghetto Anthem)."

After having directed a number of music videos, Ice Cube hired Carr to direct the sequel to his hit film Friday (1995). The film, the R-rated comedy Next Friday, was Carr's first feature film. He subsequently directed the films Dr. Dolittle 2, Daddy Day Care, Are We Done Yet?, Rebound, and Paul Blart: Mall Cop. He also directed a segment in Movie 43 and executive produced the 2006 TV movie Santa Baby starring Jenny McCarthy, its sequel Santa Baby 2: Christmas Maybe, and was at one time attached to direct National Security starring Martin Lawrence and Steve Zahn, and an earlier film adaptation of Iron Fist. In 2020, it was announced Carr was set to direct a Netflix romantic comedy, A Merry Little Ex-Mas, released in 2025.

== Filmography ==
Year	Title	Director	Executive producer	Notes
2000	Next Friday	Yes	No	
2001	Dr. Dolittle 2	Yes	No	
2003	Daddy Day Care	Yes	No	
2005	Rebound	Yes	No	
2007	Are We Done Yet?	Yes	Yes	
2009	Paul Blart: Mall Cop	Yes	No	
2013	Movie 43 (Segment: "The Proposition")	Yes	No	Golden Raspberry Award for Worst Director (shared with the other 14 directors)
2016	Middle School: The Worst Years of My Life	Yes	No	
2018	Freaky Friday	Yes	Yes	TV movie
2025	A Merry Little Ex-Mas	Yes	No	
