= The Cherokee Kid =

1996 American comedy television film

- Genre: Comedy; Western
- Written by: Tim Kazurinsky; Denise DeClue
- Directed by: Paris Barclay
- Starring: Sinbad; James Coburn; Burt Reynolds; Gregory Hines; A Martinez; Ernie Hudson; Dawnn Lewis; Vanessa Bell Calloway
- Music by: Stanley Clarke
- Country of origin: United States
- Original language: English

Production
- Executive producers: Sinbad; Paula Weinstein
- Producer: Robin Forman Howard
- Production locations: Laramie Street, Warner Brothers Burbank Studios - 4000 Warner Boulevard, Burbank, California
- Cinematography: Jack Conroy
- Editor: Earl Watson
- Running time: 91 minutes
- Production companies: Afros & Bellbottoms Productions; HBO Pictures; Spring Creek Productions

Original release
- Network: HBO
- Release: December 14, 1996

The Cherokee Kid is a 1996 American made for television western film directed by Paris Barclay for HBO. The film's stars were Sinbad, James Coburn, Burt Reynolds, Gregory Hines, A Martinez, Ernie Hudson, Dawnn Lewis and Vanessa Bell Calloway.

== Plot ==
Isaiah Turner (Sinbad (comedian)) a.k.a. “The Cherokee Kid” faces The Undertaker (Gregory Hines) in a duel in Larabee, Texas, and appears to be killed, much to land-grabber Bloomington's (James Coburn) delight. At the funeral, Juan Cortina (A Martinez) delivers the eulogy revealing the Kid's backstory.

Isaiah lived with his family in Oklahoma territory during railroad expansion. When his half-Cherokee father opposed selling their land, he was murdered. Isaiah and his brother Jedediah killed the responsible railroad man in revenge. Their mother scolded them for confusing "stupidity with courage" and gave them their father's Cherokee-feathered hat before helping Jedediah escape by pretending to shoot him. Bloomington then arrived and killed their mother, leaving a scar when she grazed his forehead. Isaiah escaped and was adopted by Reverend Peel (Hal Williams) and his wife.

Fourteen years later, the clumsy but determined Isaiah sees a poster advertising Bloomington's gubernatorial campaign. He sets out for revenge but gets lost (a running gag) and accidentally kills outlaw Jake Carver with a turkey while saving a prostitute. Carver's gang finds him, and Isaiah tricks them into taking him to Pinedale by claiming to be Carver's friend planning a bank robbery.

In Pinedale, Isaiah's botched robbery attempt and failed assassination of Bloomington leads him to hide with mountain man Otter Bob (Burt Reynolds). For three months, Otter Bob teaches Isaiah survival and shooting skills in exchange for reading lessons. When Bonner's men catch up, Otter Bob sacrifices himself to save Isaiah. Isaiah then rescues Juan Cortina from the desert, and Cortina vows to repay the debt.

In El Paso, Isaiah is captured and jailed with famous gunslinger Nat Love (Ernie Hudson), who reveals that Jedediah became a gunslinger but died in a duel with The Undertaker. Cortina breaks them out, and they join Nat's gang including Stagecoach Mary. Under Nat's harsh tutelage, Isaiah rapidly develops into a skilled gunslinger and earns the name “Cherokee Kid.” After participating in a successful bank robbery, Isaiah and Cortina parted ways with the gang.

The Cherokee Kid targets Bloomington's banks, forcing the desperate railroad baron to hire bounty hunters, including The Undertaker. Isaiah and Cortina seek fresh horses at the Holsopple farm, where daughter Abby (Vanessa Bell Calloway) knocks them out hoping to collect the bounty to save their land. After escaping, Isaiah challenges The Undertaker to a duel.

During their showdown, both fighters recognize each other—The Undertaker is Jedediah Turner, Isaiah's brother. The staged duel allows Isaiah to "rise from the dead" and attack Bloomington's men. A massive gunfight erupts with their allies against Bloomington's forces. Nat Love dies in the battle, and Cortina is wounded.

The reunited brothers work together to defeat Bloomington's remaining men. Isaiah corners Bloomington in a barn, rejects his partnership offer, and executes him when the villain tries to shoot him in the back. Jedediah saves Isaiah from Bonner's final ambush.

After Nat's burial, the brothers plan to head west together seeking new adventures. Despite Abby's protests that he no longer needs to be "The Cherokee Kid," Isaiah enjoys his gunslinger life. When Cortina tries to leave, Isaiah reminds him of their debt bond. As they ride away, Abby shoots at them demanding to join their group.

== Cast ==
- Sinbad as Isaiah Turner / "The Cherokee Kid"
  - DeJuan Guy as Young Isaiah Turner
- Gregory Hines as Jedediah Turner / The Undertaker
  - Kareem R. Woods as Young Jedediah Turner
- James Coburn as Cyrus B. Bloomington
- A Martinez as Juan Nepomuceno Cortina
- Ernie Hudson as Nat Love / Deadwood Dick
- Mark Pellegrino as Frank Bonner
- Burt Reynolds as Bob "Otter Bob", The Mountain Man
- Dawnn Lewis as Mary "Stagecoach Mary", The Love Gang
- Reginald T. Dorsey as "Cowboy" Graham, The Love Gang
- Nancy Lenehan as Sister Faith, The Love Gang
- Hal Williams as Reverend Peel
- Hattie Winston as Mrs. Elizabeth Peel
- Ivory Ocean as Pa Holsopple
- Alaina Reed Hall as Ma Holsopple
- Edward B. Hicks as Eddie "Toothless Eddie"
- Tim Kazurinsky as Gaudy Hawker
- Arnetia Walker as Jenny
- Jim Cody Williams as Billy Ray
- Roxanne Reese as Ma Henderson
- Vanessa Bell Calloway as Abby Holsopple
- Lorraine Toussaint as Mama Annie Turner
- Obba Babatunde as Isom Dart
- W. Earl Brown as Calloway
- Gary Carlos Cervantes as Cletus
- Roy Fegan as Seth
- Martin Grey as Martin
- Stuart Proud Eagle Grant as Proud Eagle
- Angela Means as Harriet
- June Kyoto Lu as Ma Lee
- James Lashly as Jake "Outlaw Jake" Carver
- Walton Goggins as Gim Bob, The Carver Gang
- Bob Minor as Otis "Cowboy Otis"
- Spice Williams-Crosby as Miss Marjorie
- Troy Garity as The Bartender
- Herb Jeffries as Himself
