= The North Star (2016 film) =

2016 film about slavery

- Directed by: Thomas K. Phillips
- Written by: Thomas K. Phillips; Tim O'Connell
- Produced by: Clifton Powell; Elizabeth A. Citrin; Nathan File; Jesse James Jackson Jr. Thomas K. Phillips
- Starring: Jeremiah Trotter; Thomas C. Bartley Jr. Clifton Powell
- Cinematography: Keiko Nakahara
- Edited by: Tom Stout
- Production company: LuckPig Studios
- Release date: March 1, 2016
- Running time: 88 minutes

The North Star is a 2016 film about slavery and the underground railroad.

== Plot summary ==
The North Star is the story of Benjamin "Big Ben" Jones and Moses Hopkins, two slaves who escaped from a Virginia plantation and made their way to freedom in Buckingham, Pennsylvania in 1849. Big Ben's 6 foot 10 inch size and a record bounty for his safe return make him the focus of every slave hunter on the east coast. Their journey exposes them to danger and cruelty; however it also exposes them to the unexpected kindness of the people involved in the Underground Railroad. These experiences will change Ben and Moses forever. Upon reaching the relative safety of Mt. Gilead Church on Buckingham Mountain, Ben and Moses get to experience life as free men and cross paths with historical figures such as Frederick Douglass, Harriet Tubman, Joshua and Jonathan Fell. Their freedom also allows them to experience heroism, romance and treachery.

== Cast ==
- Jeremiah Trotter as Big Ben Jones
- Thomas C. Bartley Jr. as Moses Hopkins (as Thomas C. Bartley)
- Clifton Powell as Mr. Lee
- John Diehl as Master Anderson
- Keith David as Frederick Douglas
- Lynn Whitfield as Miss Grace

== See also ==
- List of films featuring slavery
