= David E. Talbert =

American dramatist

- Born: February 10, 1966 (age 60); United States
- Occupations: Playwright, author, filmmaker
- Years active: 1997–present
- Website: www.davidetalbert.com

David E. Talbert (born February 10, 1966) is an American playwright, author, and filmmaker. He is a graduate of Morgan State University and attended the New York University film program.

Talbert has won numerous NAACP awards for his work The Fabric of a Man, and a New York Literary Award in 2007 for his musical stageplay, Love in the Nick of Tyme. Talbert has also produced a television reality show, Stage Black, in which actors and singers compete to win a part in one of his plays.

Talbert's first film, First Sunday, was released in 2008. The film stars Ice Cube, Tracy Morgan and Katt Williams. More recently, he signed a first look deal with Netflix.

== Works ==
=== Novels ===
- Baggage Claim (2003)
- Love on the Dotted Line (2005)
- Love Don't Live Here No More: Book One of Doggy Tales (2006, with Snoop Dogg)

=== Plays ===
- Tellin' It Like It Tiz (1991–1993)
- Lawd Ha' Mercy (1993–1994)
- What Goes Around Comes Around (1994–1995)
- He Say She Say... But What Does God Say? (1996)
- A Fool And His Money (1997)
- Talk Show Live (1998)
- Mr. Right Now (1998–1999)
- His Woman, His Wife (2000)
- The Fabric Of A Man (2001)
- Love Makes Things Happen (2002)
- Love On Lay-a-way (2003)
- Love in the Nick of Tyme (2009)
- What My Husband Doesn't Know (2011)
- Suddenly Single (2012)
- Another Man Will (2015)

=== Films ===
Year	Title	Director	Writer	Producer
1997	A Women Like That	Yes	Yes	Yes
1999	Mr. Right Now!	Yes	Yes	No
2000	His Woman, His Wife	Yes	Yes	No
2004	He Say... She Say... But What Does GOD Say?	Yes	Yes	No
2005	The Fabric of a Man	Yes	Yes	Yes
2005	Love on Layaway	Yes	Yes	Yes
2008	First Sunday	Yes	Yes	Yes
2013	Baggage Claim	Yes	Yes	Yes
2016	Almost Christmas	Yes	Yes	Executive
2017	El Camino Christmas	Yes	No	Executive
2020	Jingle Jangle: A Christmas Journey	Yes	Yes	Yes
