= John Witherspoon (actor) =

American actor (1942–2019)

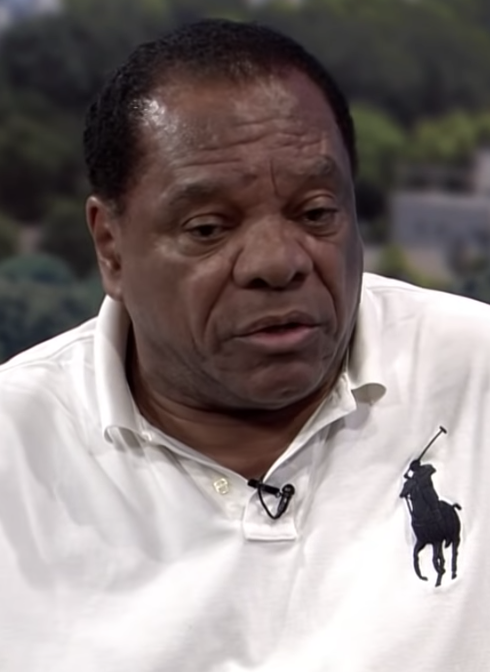
- Witherspoon in 2019
- Born: John Weatherspoon; January 27, 1942; Detroit, Michigan, U.S.
- Died: October 29, 2019 (aged 77); Los Angeles, California, U.S.
- Burial place: Forest Lawn Memorial Park, Hollywood Hills, California, U.S.
- Other names: Pops, Spoon
- Occupations: Actor; comedian
- Years active: 1977–2019
- Spouse: Angela Robinson (m. 1988)
- Children: 2

John Witherspoon (né Weatherspoon; January 27, 1942 – October 29, 2019) was an American actor and comedian who performed in various television shows and films. He played Willie Jones in the Friday series, and starred in films such as Hollywood Shuffle (1987), Boomerang (1992), The Five Heartbeats (1991), and Vampire in Brooklyn (1995). In addition, Witherspoon made appearances on television shows such as The Fresh Prince of Bel-Air (1994), The Wayans Bros. (1995–1999), The Tracy Morgan Show (2003), Barnaby Jones (1973), The Boondocks (2005–2014), and Black Jesus (2014–2019).

== Early life ==
Witherspoon was born on January 27, 1942, in Detroit, Michigan. He later changed his last name from Weatherspoon to Witherspoon. Witherspoon was one of 11 siblings. His older brother, William, became a songwriter for Motown, with whom he penned the lyrics of the 1966 hit single "What Becomes of the Brokenhearted". Another sibling, Cato, was a director of the PBS-TV Network/CH56 in Detroit. His sister, the late Dr. Gertrude Stacks, was a pastor at Shalom Fellowship International, a church in Detroit. Witherspoon had a passion for music and learned to play the trumpet and French horn.

== Career ==
Witherspoon worked occasionally as a model. During the 1960s and 1970s, he began his stand-up comedy career. He had many friends in the business, including Tim Reid (while he was working on WKRP in Cincinnati and The Richard Pryor Show), Robin Williams (also on The Richard Pryor Show), Jay Leno, and David Letterman.

Witherspoon performed in many feature films (usually comedies), including Friday (and its sequels Next Friday and Friday After Next), Hollywood Shuffle, I'm Gonna Git You Sucka, Bird, Vampire in Brooklyn, and The Meteor Man.

Witherspoon was also known for his over-the-top characters in films such as House Party, in which he played an irritated neighbor who is repeatedly woken up by the party, and Boomerang with Eddie Murphy, where he plays Mr. Jackson, the ill-mannered father of Murphy's best friend.

=== Television ===
His first television appearance was on the 1970s CBS television show Barnaby Jones, playing a camp counselor for drug addicted youth. Subsequent appearances were on Good Times, What's Happening!!, and The Incredible Hulk. In 1977, he became a regular on the series The Richard Pryor Show, an NBC American comedy series. This then led to his 1982 appearance in WKRP In Cincinnati, in which Witherspoon played Detective Davies, on the fourth-season episode "Circumstantial Evidence".

In 1981, he appeared in the NBC police drama Hill Street Blues, as a man who tries to buy a hotdog from undercover Detective Belker. In 1991, he had an appearance on NBC's legal drama L.A. Law, in the episode "On Your Honor" as Mark Steadman. He appeared in You Again? as Osborne. Other television show appearances include 227, which was an NBC comedy about women who lived in a majority black apartment complex, and What's Happening Now!!, the sequel to What's Happening!!.

Witherspoon was also featured in the American television sitcom Amen (1988), as the bailiff. The show, which ran on NBC, was known for being one of the shows during the 1980s that featured an almost entirely black cast.

Next came spots on Townsend Television (1993), Cosmic Slop (1994), and Murder Was the Case (1994) as a drunk.

He later appeared in the 1997 Living Single episode "Three Men and a Buckeye" as Smoke Eye Howard. His largest role in a television series was on The Wayans Bros. (1995–1999) which aired on The WB and starred Shawn and Marlon Wayans, who played brothers Shawn and Marlon Williams. Witherspoon played their father, John "Pops" Williams.

He was also on the Kids' WB animation series Waynehead, which was about a young boy growing up poor in Harlem, New York City. The show, which aired on Saturday mornings, was based on creator Damon Wayans' life.

In 2003, Witherspoon made a showing on NBC's Last Comic Standing, a reality television show that selected the top comedian out of a group and gave him a contract, in the Las Vegas finals. That same year, he performed as Oran Jones in The Proud Family episode "Adventures in Bebe Sitting". He later guest-starred in an episode of Kim Possible. During this time, Witherspoon was also featured as Spoon in all 18 episodes of the comedy series The Tracy Morgan Show.

In 2004, he appeared in Pryor Offenses, a television movie where he played Willie the Wino. In 2005, he was seen in the Comedy Central talk show Weekends at the D.L. where he portrayed the character of Michael Johnson. That same year, he began starring in Aaron McGruder's animated series The Boondocks as Robert Jebediah "Granddad" Freeman; this Cartoon Network/Adult Swim series ran for four seasons. In 2006, he performed as Real Santa, a Christmas singer on the radio, in the television movie, Thugaboo: A Miracle on D-Roc's Street, a story of a group of kids who find the true meaning of Christmas. His next appearance was on The Super Rumble Mixshow in 2008. In 2011, he starred in a Final Destination spoof with Shane Dawson on YouTube. In May 2013, he was featured on "Saturday (skit)", from rapper Logic's 2013 mixtape titled Young Sinatra: Welcome to Forever. He later performed in another Aaron McGruder series, Black Jesus, portraying Lloyd, a homeless man.

=== Music videos ===
Witherspoon appeared in a number of music videos by artists in the music industry. In 2000, he was in the music video for hip-hop superstar Jay-Z's hit single "I Just Wanna Love U (Give It 2 Me)". He later made a cameo as a car wash owner in the Sugar Ray music video Mr. Bartender (It's So Easy). Other music video credits include Field Mob's "Sick of Being Lonely", Goodie Mob's "They Don't Dance No Mo'", and LL Cool J's "Ain't Nobody". In 2008, Witherspoon released a hip-hop comedy album titled "63 Cent".

=== Comedy tour ===
Witherspoon went back to his comedian roots and started a comedy tour that premiered on television on March 28, 2008, on Showtime. On his 2009 tour, he had 19 stops across the country. In December 2011, Witherspoon performed his stand-up comedy act once again on stage at the Funny Bone comedy club at Harrah's Casino in Tunica, Mississippi.

== Personal life and death ==
Witherspoon married Angela Robinson in 1988. They raised two sons, John David ("J.D.") and Alexander. David Letterman was Witherspoon's best friend and is the godfather of his two sons.

Witherspoon died of a heart attack at his home in Sherman Oaks, Los Angeles, on October 29, 2019, at age 77. His funeral was held in Los Angeles on November 5, 2019, and he was buried at Forest Lawn Memorial Park in Hollywood Hills, California.

== Filmography ==
=== Film ===
Year	Title	Role	Notes
1980	The Jazz Singer	M.C. Cinderella Club	
1986	Ratboy	Heavy	
1987	Hollywood Shuffle	Mr. Jones	
1988	Bird	Sid	
1988	I'm Gonna Git You Sucka	Reverend	
1990	House Party	Mr. Strickland	
1991	The Five Heartbeats	Wild Rudy	
1991	Talkin' Dirty After Dark	Dukie	
1991	Killer Tomatoes Strike Back	Evan Rood	
1992	Boomerang	Mr. Jackson	
1992	Bebe's Kids	Card Player #1	Voice
1993	The Meteor Man	Clarence James Carter III	
1993	Fatal Instinct	Arch	
1994	Murder Was the Case	Drunk #1	
1995	Friday	Willie Jones	
1995	Vampire in Brooklyn	Silas Green	
1997	Sprung	Detective	
1997	Fakin' da Funk	Bill	
1998	Ride	Roscoe	
1998	Bulworth	Reverend Morris	
1998	I Got the Hook-Up	Mr. Mimm	
1998	High Freakquency	Wes Thomas	
2000	Next Friday	Willie Jones	
2000	The Ladies Man	Scrap Iron	
2000	Little Nicky	Street Vendor	
2001	Dr. Dolittle 2	Zoo Bear #2	Voice
2002	Friday After Next	Willie Jones	
2004	Soul Plane	Blind Man	
2006	Little Man	Pops	
2006	God's Gift	Store	
2007	After Sex	Gene	
2008	The Super Rumble Mixshow		
2008	The Hustle	Mr. Wikes	
2008	You Got to Coordinate	Himself	Stand-up
2009	Hopelessly in June	Mr. Myers	
2011	Chick Magnet	John	
2012	A Thousand Words	Blind Old Man	
2019	I Got the Hook-Up 2	Mr. Mimm	
2020	Reality Queen	Joe The Plumber	Posthumous release; Final film role

=== Television ===
Year	Title	Role	Notes
1977	The Richard Pryor Show	Various	2 episodes
1978	The Incredible Hulk	Tom	Episode: "Final Round"
1978	What's Happening!!	D.J.	Episode: "Disco Dollar Disaster"
1979	Good Times	Officer Lawson	Episode: "A Matter of Mothers"
1979	Barnaby Jones	Frank Wales	Episode: "School of Terror"
1982	WKRP in Cincinnati	Detective Davies	Episode: "Circumstantial Evidence"
1982	Hill Street Blues	Businessman	Episode: "The Young, The Beautiful and the Degraded"
1986	You Again?	Osborne	Episode: "Good Neighbors"
1987	227	Man #2	Episode: "Low Noon"
1987	What's Happening Now!!	Adam	Episode: "Family Life"
1987	Frank's Place	Ray Parrish	Episode: "Season's Greetings"
1988	Amen	The Balliff	2 episodes
1990	L.A. Law	Mark Steadman	Episode: "On Your Honor"
1993	Townsend Television	Various	10 episodes
1993	Martin	Uncle Junior	Episode: "Thanks for Nothing"
1994	The Fresh Prince of Bel-Air	Augustus Adams	Episode: "The Harder They Fall"
1995–1999	The Wayans Bros.	John "Pops" Williams	Main cast 101 episodes
1996–1997	Waynehead	Dad	Voice, 3 episodes
1997	Living Single	Smoke Eye Howard	
2000	Happily Ever After: Fairy Tales for Every Child	Scofflaw	
2003–2004	The Proud Family	Mr. Jones	Voice, 3 episodes
2003–2004	The Tracy Morgan Show	Spoon	
2004	Kim Possible	Wayne	Voice, Episode: "Rewriting History"
2004	Pryor Offenses	Willie The Wino	TV movie
2005	Weekends at the D.L.	Michael Johnson	Episode: "1.14"
2005–2014	The Boondocks	Robert "Granddad" Freeman / Blind Man	Voice, Main cast 55 episodes
2006	Thugaboo: A Miracle on D-Roc's Street	Real Santa / Christmas Singer on Radio	Voice, TV movie
2008	The Super Rumble Mixshow		
2011	Tosh.0	Fart Section Bus Passenger	Episode: "Fart Bus Kid"
2012–2015	The First Family	Grandpa Alvin	Recurring role 28 episodes
2013	Randy Cunningham: 9th Grade Ninja	S. Ward Smith	Voice, Episode: "Sword Quest"
2014	Anger Management	Will	Episode: "Charlie Tests His Power"
2014–2019	Black Jesus	Lloyd	31 episodes
2014	Black Dynamite		Voice, Episode: "The Warriors Come Out or The Mean Queens of Halloween"
2016	Black-ish	James Brown	2 episodes
2016	Animals.	Jimmy	Voice, Episode: "Squirrels Part I"
2017	White Famous	Limo Driver	Episode: "Pilot"
2019	BoJack Horseman	Franco Aplenty	Voice, Episode: "Surprise!”

== Albums ==
Comedy albums

- 63 Cent (2008)
