= Hal Williams =

American actor (1934–2026)

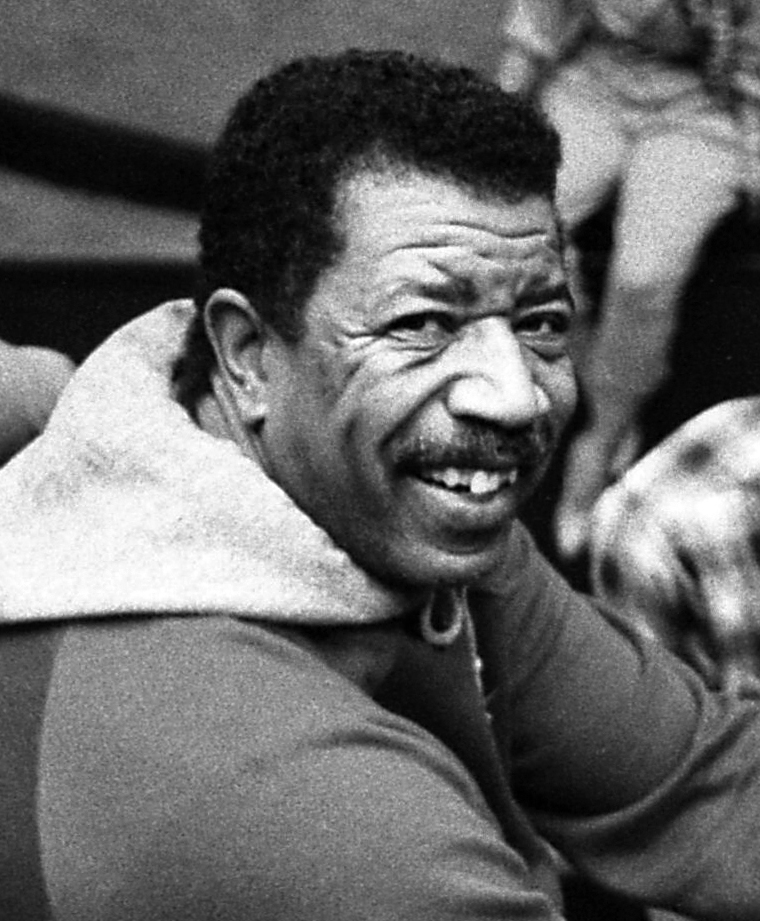
- Williams in 1986
- Born: Halroy Candis Williams; December 14, 1934; Columbus, Ohio, U.S.
- Died: July 15, 2026 (aged 91); Rancho Mirage, California, U.S.
- Occupation: Actor
- Years active: 1969–2025
- Known for: Lester Jenkins – 227; Smitty – Sanford and Son; Sgt. Ross – Private Benjamin (film and TV series)
- Spouses: Gay Anderson (m. 1975; div. 1976) Renee W. Himes (m. 1978; div. 1984)
- Children: 3

Halroy Candis Williams (December 14, 1934 – July 15, 2026) was an American actor, best known for his recurring roles as Officer Smith ("Smitty") on Sanford and Son (1972–1976), Harley Foster on The Waltons (1973–1980), and as family patriarch Lester Jenkins on the NBC sitcom 227 which originally aired from 1985 until 1990. His film credits include Private Benjamin (1980), Guess Who (2005), and Flight (2012).

== Early life ==
Halroy Candis Williams was born in Columbus, Ohio, in 1934, 1938, or 1939. However, one source says he was born on December 14, 1938.

== Career ==
In the early 1960s, Williams began acting in community theater in Ohio. Williams worked as a postal worker and corrections officer before moving to Hollywood to pursue an acting career in 1968.

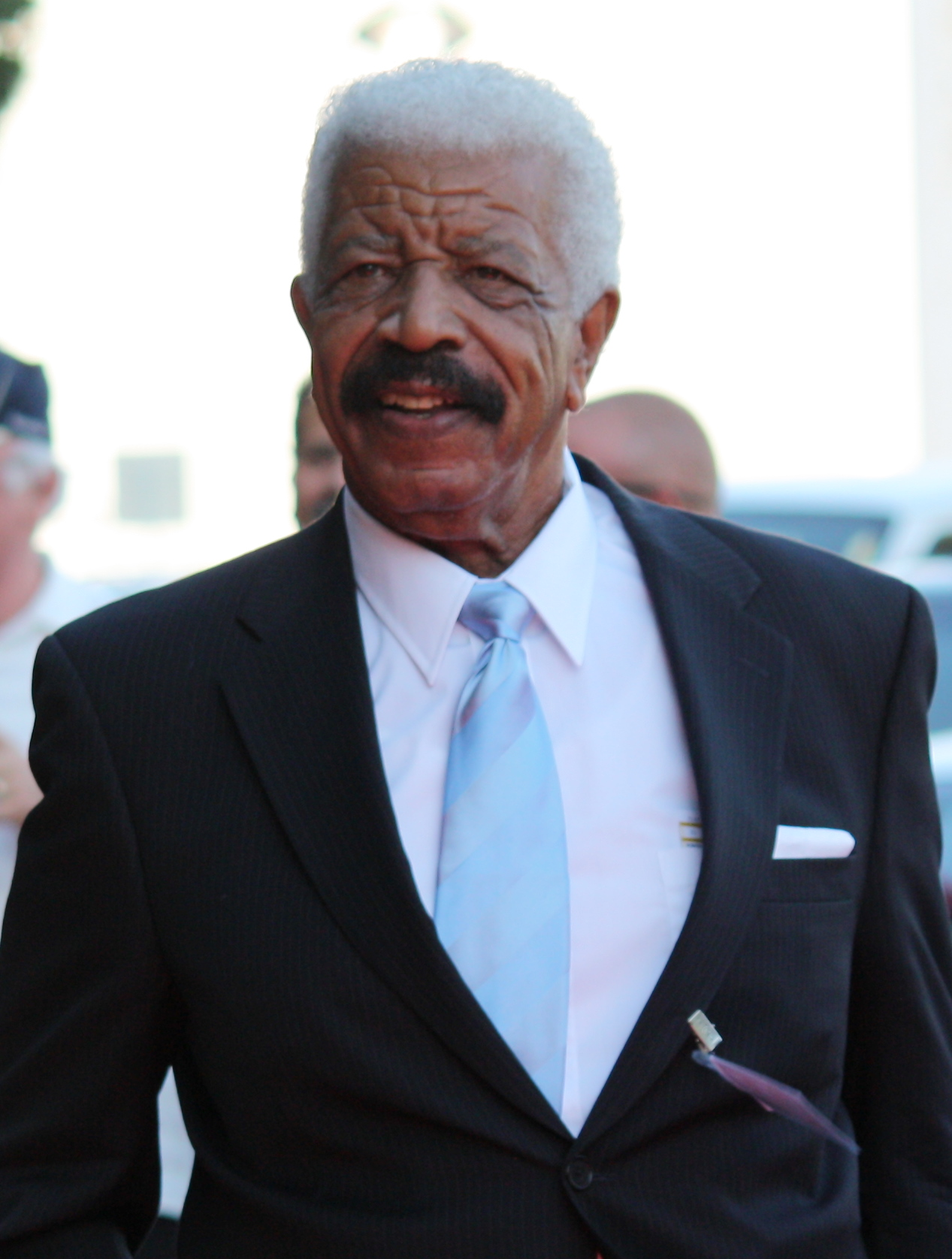
Williams at The Waltons' 40th anniversary, 2012

Williams began pursuing his acting career full-time in 1970. In 1973, he appeared as a guest star on the television series Kung Fu, playing a friend of Caine named Caleb in the second-season premiere. In 1975, he reprised the role in the 24th episode of the third season. From 1972 to 1976, Williams had a recurring role as Officer "Smitty" Smith on Sanford and Son and the follow-up series Sanford. From 1973 to 1980, he played Harley Foster on The Waltons.

Willams appeared in the 1974 Disney film Herbie Rides Again as a Police Officer. He also appeared in Paul Schrader's 1979 film Hardcore as an auditioning adult film actor. The following year, he co-starred as Drill Sergeant L.C. "Ted" Ross in Howard Zieff's Private Benjamin, a role he would reprise in the television series of the same name. After the series concluded, Williams was cast as working-class husband and father Lester Jenkins in 227, which ran from 1985 until 1990. In the early to mid-1990s, he co-starred with the comic Sinbad in The Sinbad Show and The Cherokee Kid. His guest appearances over the years included Good Times, The Jeffersons, Hill Street Blues, Magnum, P.I., Night Court, and Moesha, among others.

Williams was also frequently cast as law enforcement characters, such as a police detective in Clint Eastwood's 1990 film The Rookie. He portrayed Howard Jones, the father to Bernie Mac's character, in the 2005 film Guess Who. He also voiced the role of Whip's Dad in the 2012 film Flight.

In 2024, Williams played Autry in the second episode of the TV series Matlock (drawn from the original series of the same name, and reprised the role the following year in the series' tenth episode.

== Personal life and death ==
Williams was married twice, and had three children. He died from natural causes at his home in Rancho Mirage, California, on July 15, 2026.

== Selected credits ==
=== Theater ===
Year	Production	Role	Theater(s)	Notes
1981	Nevis Mountain Dew	Boise McCanles	Los Angeles Actors Theatre	

=== Film ===
Year	Title	Role	Notes
1972	Cool Breeze	Harry, Policeman	Uncredited
1974	Herbie Rides Again	Ticketing Police Officer	
1979	Hardcore	Big Dick Blaque	
1980	On the Nickel	Paul	
1980	Private Benjamin	Drill Sergeant L.C. Ross	
1982	The Escape Artist	Cop At Mayor's Office	
1990	The Rookie	Detective Powell	
1996	The Cherokee Kid	Reverend Peel	
2005	Guess Who	Howard Jones	
2011	Night Club	Resident Playing Cards At Casino Night	
2012	Flight	Whip's Dad	Voice

=== Television ===
Year	Title	Role	Notes
1971	The Jimmy Stewart Show	Lieutenant Quigley	1 episode
1971	That Girl	Herbie Robinson	2 episodes
1972–1976	Sanford and Son	Officer "Smitty" Smith	20 episodes
1973	Kung Fu	Caleb Brown	Season 2, episode 1 – "The Well"
1973–1980	The Waltons	Harley Foster	7 episodes
1974	Sidekicks	Max	TV movie
1975	Gunsmoke	Widge	Season 14, episode 20 – "Hard Labor"
1975	S.W.A.T.	Bo Tate	Season 1, episode 12 – "Sole Survivor"
1975–1976	On the Rocks	Lester DeMott	Main cast
1977	Quincy, M.E.	Cody	Season 2, episode 9 – "The Hot Dog Murder"
1979	Roots: The Next Generations	Aleck Haley	Season 1, episode 3 – "Part III (1914–1918)"
1979	What's Happening!!	Mr. Logan	Season 3, episode 17 – "The Eviction"
1979	The White Shadow	Henry Judd	Season 2, episode 3 – "Sudden Death"
1980	Knots Landing	Magazine Owner	2 episodes
1980–1981	Sanford	Officer "Smitty" Smith	5 episodes
1982	TJ Hooker	Officer Bryan	Season 1, episode 1 – "The Protectors"
1981–1983	Private Benjamin	Sergeant Ted Ross	Main cast
1984	The Dukes of Hazzard	Jonas Jones	Season 6, episode 21 – "Cooter's Confession"
1984	Webster	Principal Jenkins	Season 2, episode 2 – "Webster Long: Part 3"
1984	The Jeffersons	Kent Tobin	Season 11, episode 5 – "Some Enchanted Evening"
1984	Gimme a Break!	Dr. Phil Gray	Season 4, episode 10 – "Julie's Lie"
1985–1990	227	Lester Jenkins	Main cast
1986	Hill Street Blues	Ken Edwards	Season 6, episode 15 – "I Want My Hill Street Blues"
1988	Magnum, P.I.	Dave, The DJ	2 episodes
1991	Night Court	Head Bailiff Reedy	Season 8, episode 13 – "Bringing Down Baby"
1993–1994	The Sinbad Show	Rudy Bryan	Main cast
1997	Moesha	Rosevelt Mitchell	1 episode
2019	A Black Lady Sketch Show	Himself	Season 1, episode 3 – "3rd & Bonaparte Is Always in the Shade"
2024–2025	Matlock	Autry	2 episodes
