= Next Friday =

2000 film directed by Steve Carr

- Theatrical release poster
- Directed by: Steve Carr
- Written by: Ice Cube
- Based on: Characters by Ice Cube; DJ Pooh
- Produced by: Ice Cube
- Starring: Ice Cube; Mike Epps; John Witherspoon; Tamala Jones; Tommy "Tiny" Lister Jr.
- Cinematography: Christopher J. Baffa
- Edited by: Elena Maganini
- Music by: Terence Blanchard
- Production companies: New Line Cinema; Cube Vision
- Distributed by: New Line Cinema
- Release date: January 12, 2000
- Running time: 98 minutes
- Country: United States
- Language: English
- Budget: $11 million
- Box office: $59.8 million

Next Friday is a 2000 American stoner comedy film and the sequel to the 1995 film Friday. It is the first film to be produced by Ice Cube's film production company Cube Vision, and to be written by Cube himself. It was directed by Steve Carr (in his feature directorial debut) and stars Ice Cube, Mike Epps, John Witherspoon, Justin Pierce, Tamala Jones, Don Curry and Tommy "Tiny" Lister Jr. It is the second installment in the Friday series. It tells the story of Craig Jones as he goes to live with his uncle, who just won the lottery, and cousin in Rancho Cucamonga after the neighborhood bully Deebo escapes from prison. There, Craig contends with three criminal brothers known as the Joker Brothers. Next Friday was theatrically released by New Line Cinema on January 12, 2000, grossing $59.8 million worldwide against an $11 million budget. The film has received generally negative reviews from critics.

A third film, titled Friday After Next, was released in November 2002.

== Plot ==
After finding out Deebo escaped prison with his brother Tyrone to get revenge on Craig, Willie decides it would be safer for Craig to move to Rancho Cucamonga to live with his uncle Elroy and cousin Day-Day, who just won the lottery, until Deebo is sent back to prison. After some stalling, Craig explains that he really didn't want to leave his neighborhood nor Smokey (who has since gone to rehab) behind. He accepts the fact that he needs to move after a run in with Deebo. Day-Day explains to Craig that while winning the lottery, all of the taxes and fees that were taken out only left them enough to buy their house and a car that is owned by Day-Day. A mailman delivers a notice informing them that their house could face repossession.

Before Craig visits Day-Day at work at a record shop, an angry customer threatens Day-Day. Craig pushes the customer, causing him to run out of the store, and Day-Day introduces Craig to his white skateboarder friend and co-worker Roach. Craig then shows Day-Day the notice. Day-Day hides from his ex-girlfriend D'Wana and her younger yet physically intimidating sister Baby D who constantly harass him saying that he is her baby's father, even though he met her when she was 3 months pregnant. D'Wana throws a brick at his car windshield. Day-Day and Roach's boss Pinky arrives at the store, finding it locked. While Day-Day and Roach are in the back smoking, a scuffle between Craig and Pinky ensues in which Pinky mistakes him for a robber, while Craig tries to explain who he is. Pinky then fires Day-Day and Roach in anger.

Craig, Day-Day and Roach try to figure out how to keep the house. Craig remembers seeing their neighbors, a trio of gang member brothers known as "the Jokers", who live with their sister Karla carrying a hydraulic pump. Suspecting that it may be hiding cash, Craig convinces Day-Day and Roach to help him get inside the Jokers' house and steal their pump.

Later that night, Roach drugs the Jokers' dog, Chico, with cannabis to keep him distracted while Craig sneaks into the Jokers' house. Craig locates the pump finding cash is hidden inside and taking some for himself. He bumps into Karla, who talks about what happened to her mom and the Joker brothers. Craig escapes out of a window. Panicking after the eldest Joker closes the window (the way Craig got into the house), Day-Day and Roach knock on the Jokers' door as a diversion for Craig to escape. After discovering the money from the pump is missing, The Jokers take Day-Day and Roach hostage and tie them up with duct tape.

Willie returns to the neighborhood while unknowingly hauling Deebo and Tyrone in his truck, who stowed away earlier after calling Willie with a message that Craig is in trouble. Craig returns to Elroy's house only to find Willie and Elroy waiting for him. Craig, Willie, and Elroy decide to head to the Jokers' house to rescue Day-Day and Roach with Elroy's girlfriend Suga saying she will call the police if they are not back in ten minutes.

The trio sneaks into the Jokers' backyard. Joker sends Baby Joker and Lil' Joker to get a chainsaw from the toolshed. Willie knocks out Baby Joker with a 2x4 and Elroy tackles Lil' Joker. Willie ties the younger Jokers up and puts them in the shed.

Joker goes out to look for his brothers and finds Elroy on the ground due to his back giving out after tackling Lil' Joker. Craig then engages him in a fight. As Craig and Joker fight, Day-Day and Roach, while bound and gagged, attempt to escape but fail until Elroy comes and unties them. Day-Day and Roach run to Craig's aid but Joker gains the upper hand when he picks up his AK-47. Deebo and Tyrone then appear and knock Joker out. Armed with Joker's rifle, Deebo prepares to shoot, but is bitten by Chico. Sheriff's department deputies arrive and arrest the Joker brothers, Deebo, and Tyrone. Craig leaves with the Jokers' pump and the money inside it. They watch TV and the neighbor, Mrs. Ho-Kym, chiropracts Elroy's back until he gives her some of the money and leaves.

After witnessing D’Wana and Baby D throw a brick at Day-Day's BMW window, Craig returns home to South Central with Willie.

== Cast ==
- Ice Cube as Craig Jones, a slacker who relocates to Rancho Cucamonga.
- Mike Epps as Daymond "Day-Day" Jones, the cousin of Craig who lives in Rancho Cucamonga.
- Justin Pierce as "Roach", a friend and co-worker of Day-Day.
- John Witherspoon as William "Willie" Jones, an animal control officer and the father of Craig who relocates his son to Rancho Cucamonga.
- Don 'D.C.' Curry as Elroy Jones, the father of Day-Day, younger brother of Willie, and uncle of Craig who lives in Rancho Cucamonga.
- Jacob Vargas as "Joker", the leader of the Jokers who is the oldest of the group.
- Tamala Jones as D'Wana, the pregnant ex-girlfriend of Day-Day who claims that Day-Day is the father of her unborn child.
- Clifton Powell as "Pinky", a record store owner who serves as Day-Day and Roach's boss.
- Tommy "Tiny" Lister, Jr. as Deebo, the neighborhood bully who escapes from prison to exact revenge on Craig.
- Kirk Jones as Tyrone, the younger brother of Deebo who also escapes from prison to help in his brother's revenge plot.
- Kym Whitley as Auntie Suga, the sex-crazed girlfriend of Elroy ever since Elroy's wife died of a heart attack the day Elroy won the lottery.
- Lobo Sebastian as "Lil' Joker", the middle brother of the Jokers.
- Ronn Reiser as Stanley, a former neighbor of Craig who Willie runs into outside a bathroom en route to Rancho Cucamonga stating that he left Willie's neighborhood since the events of the first film.
- Amy Hill as Mrs. Ho-Kym, the Korean next-door neighbor of Elroy.
- Robyn Allen as "Baby D", the younger sister of D'Wana.
- Rolando Molina as "Baby Joker", the youngest brother of the Jokers.
- Lisa Rodríguez as Karla, the sister of the Jokers.
- Michael Blackson as Angry Customer
- Nicole Lydy as Ashley Nicole
- Lendell "Kebo" Keeble as Pinky's chauffeur
- Michael Rapaport as Mailman with tax notice (uncredited)

Chris Tucker was approached to return as "Smokey", but he declined. This was covered up in Craig's opening narration which stated that Smokey checked in to rehab one month ago. Tucker appears as Smokey in the beginning of the movie via footage from Friday.

== Soundtrack ==
The film's soundtrack, which featured appearances from Aaliyah, Eminem, Bone Thugs-n-Harmony, Ice Cube, N.W.A., Snoop Dogg, Wu-Tang Clan, and Wyclef Jean, peaked at number five on the R&B/Hip-Hop chart, and number nineteen on the Billboard 200 in 2000.

== Release ==
In the United States, the film was released on January 12, 2000.

=== Home video ===
Next Friday was released on VHS and DVD format on June 6, 2000. The single disc DVD contains a theatrical trailer, music videos, a "making of..." featurette, behind the scenes footage, and an alternate ending as well as cast and crew information.

== Reception ==
=== Box office ===
Next Friday debuted at number one at the US box office and grossed $16.9 million in its opening four-day weekend in 1,103 theaters, averaging $17,450 per theater. The film went on to gross $57.3 million in the United States and Canada and $2.5 million at the international box office, for a total of $59.8 million worldwide. The film is the most successful in the franchise.

=== Critical response ===
On Rotten Tomatoes, the film holds an approval rating of 22% based on 65 reviews with an average rating of 4.1/10. The website's critical consensus reads, "Next Friday lacks the fun of the original Friday. The movie is messy and plotless and relies on unfunny vulgar gags." On Metacritic, the film received a weighted average score of 41 based on 25 critics, indicating "mixed or average reviews". Audiences polled by CinemaScore gave the film an average grade of "B+" on an A+ to F scale.

=== Awards ===
2000 MTV Movie Awards
Best Comedic Performance — Ice Cube (nominated)

== See also ==
- List of hood films
