= Clifton Powell =

American actor and comedian

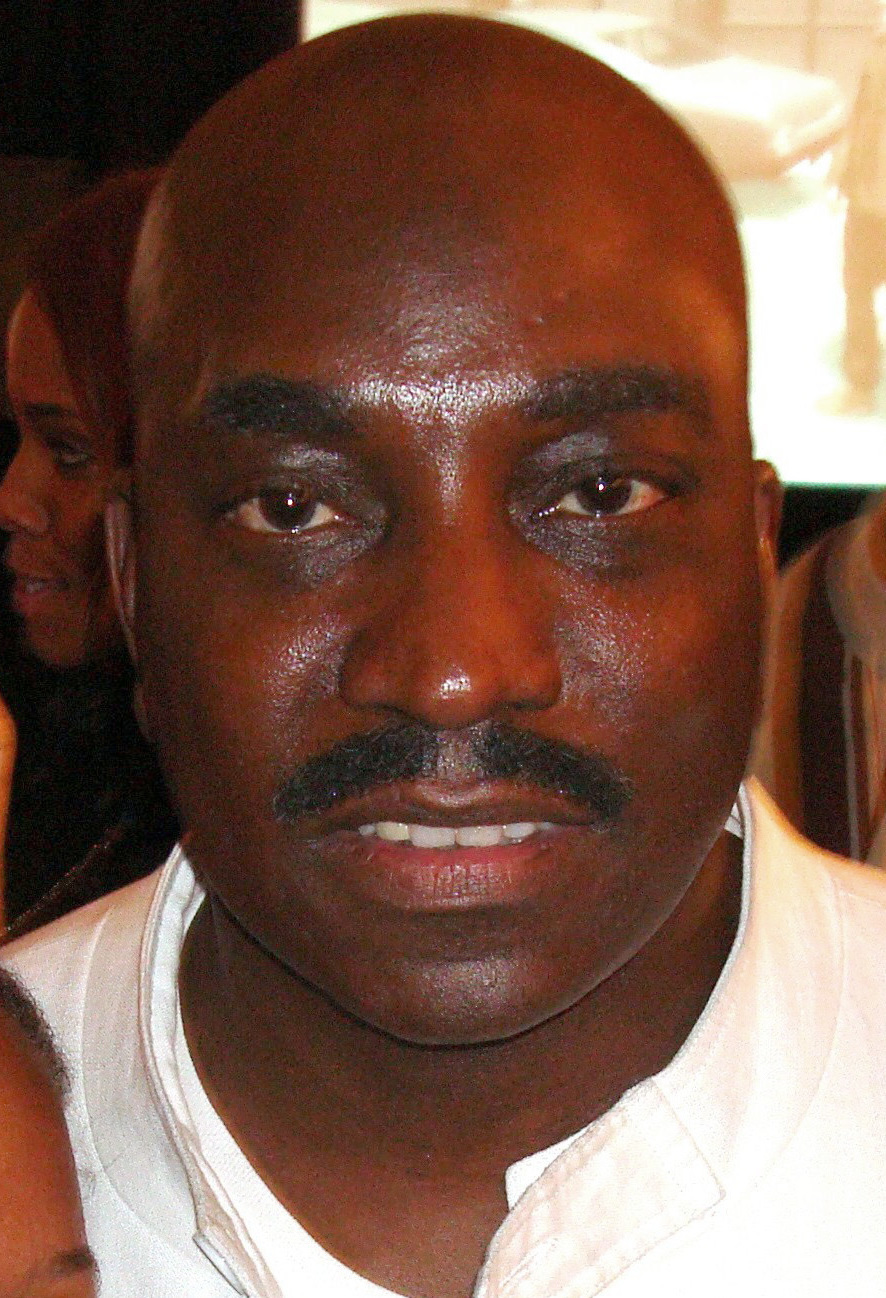
- Powell in 2007
- Born: Washington, D.C., U.S.
- Occupations: Actor; comedian
- Years active: 1981–present
- Spouse: Kimberly Powell
- Children: 2

Clifton Powell is an American actor and comedian who has primarily played supporting roles in films, such as in Ray (2004), for which he received an NAACP Image Award for Outstanding Supporting Actor in a Motion Picture nomination. He is also known for voicing Melvin "Big Smoke" Harris in the action-adventure game Grand Theft Auto: San Andreas (2004).

== Career ==
Powell had a string of critical and commercial successes in the 1990s and early 2000s. These films include House Party (1990), Menace II Society (1993), Dead Presidents (1995), Why Do Fools Fall in Love, Rush Hour (both 1998), Selma, Lord, Selma (1999), Next Friday (2000), and its 2002 sequel, Friday After Next, Woman Thou Art Loosed (2004), and Ray (2004). He was initially cast in a supporting role in the Eddie Murphy-led film Vampire in Brooklyn, (1995) but abruptly quit the movie after an unnamed sound operator was allegedly racist toward him and the film's producers - who were informed about the incident - chose not to do anything about it. A decade later, Murphy went on to cast Powell in a supporting role in the box office hit Norbit. (2007)

Around that time in the mid 2000s and continuing for the next two decades, Powell transitioned to working on many smaller, low budget, direct-to-video films as well as appearing in small guest roles on television shows. Powell had recurring roles on Roc, South Central, and Army Wives, and well as guest-starred on In the Heat of the Night, Murder, She Wrote, NYPD Blue, CSI: Crime Scene Investigation, and House. In 2016, Powell was cast as main antagonist in the Bounce TV first prime time soap opera, Saints & Sinners opposite Vanessa Bell Calloway and Gloria Reuben. Powell also lent his voice for Big Smoke in the action-adventure game Grand Theft Auto: San Andreas (2004).

== Personal life ==
Powell was born in Washington, D.C., and grew up in Mayfair Mansions in Northeast D.C. He attended HD Woodson Senior High School, before he transferred and graduated from the Duke Ellington School of the Arts. Powell is married to Kimberly, with whom he has two children.

== Filmography ==
=== Film ===
Year	Title	Role	Notes
1984	Alphabet City	Ramon	
1990	House Party	Sharane's Brother	
1990	Heat Wave	Rioter 1	TV movie
1992	Deep Cover	Officer Leland	
1992	3 Ninjas	FBI Agent Jerry Kurl	
1993	Conflict of Interest	Detective Oakes	
1993	Menace II Society	Chauncey	
1994	Green Dolphin Beat	Armstrong	TV movie
1994	Nowhere to Hide	Braddock	TV movie
1995	Divas	Bobby	TV movie
1995	Dead Presidents	Cutty	
1997	Riot	Steve	TV movie
1997	First Time Felon	King	TV movie
1997	Buffalo Soldiers	–	TV movie
1998	Phantoms	General Leland Copperfield	
1998	Deep Rising	Mason	
1998	Caught Up	Herbert / Frank Lowden	
1998	The Pentagon Wars	Sergeant Benjamin Dalton	TV movie
1998	Why Do Fools Fall in Love	Lawrence Roberts	
1998	Rush Hour	Luke	
1999	Safe House	Detective Horace Williams	
1999	The Breaks	Cosmo	
1999	Foolish	Everette Washington	
1999	Having Our Say: The Delany Sisters' First 100 Years	Frazier Johnson	TV movie
1999	No Tomorrow	Styles	
2000	Next Friday	Pinky	
2000	Hot Boyz	Saint	Video
2000	A Private Affair	Isaiah	TV movie
2000	Lockdown	Malachi Young	
2001	The Brothers	Fred Smith	
2001	Bones	Jeremiah Peet	
2002	Civil Brand	Captain Alan Deese	
2002	Ticker	FBI Agent	Short
2002	Friday After Next	Pinky	
2002	Play'd: A Hip Hop Story	Oz	TV movie
2003	Crime Partners	Kenyatta	
2003	Love Chronicles	Thomas	
2003	Tapped Out	Detective Blackman	
2004	Never Die Alone	Moon	
2004	Woman Thou Art Loosed	Reggie	
2004	Ray	Jeff Brown	
2004	Roscoe's House of Chicken n Waffles	Mo Fro	Video
2004	Sugar Valentine	Joshua Valentine	
2004	Da Block Party	Action Jackson	Video
2004	Pryor Offenss	Bucky	TV movie
2004	He Say... She Say... But What Does GOD Say?	Satin Jones	Video
2004	Choices 2	–	Video
2005	Rhythm City Volume One: Caught Up	Big Man	Video
2005	White Men Can't Rap	DaRon	
2005	Golden Empire	Old School	
2005	The Fabric of a Man	Blair	Video
2005	Brothers in Arms	Doc	
2005	The Gospel	Bishop Fred Taylor	
2005	Knights of the South Bronx	Cokey	TV movie
2006	Confessions of a Call Girl	Chauncey	
2006	Who Made the Potatoe Salad?	Mr. Jenkins	
2006	It Ain't Easy	Fish	Video
2006	Faceless	Langdon Fox	TV movie
2007	Norbit	Earl Latimore	
2007	Da Block Party 2	Action Jackson	Video
2007	Gangsta Rap: The Glockumentary	Tommy Guns	
2007	Young Cesar	Ali Dean	
2007	Father of Lies	Bishop Calvin Jacobs	Video
2008	First Sunday	Officer Eddie King	
2008	R&B Chick	Benjamin	Video
2008	Show Stoppers	Coach	
2008	Street Kings	Sergeant Green	
2008	Love for Sale	Cinque	
2008	Block Party Madness	Action Jackson	Video
2008	Vicious Circle	Freddy	
2008	3 Dimensions of a Man	Spencer	Video
2008	The Rimshop	Joe Joe's Father	
2008	Internet Dating	Leroy 'The Pimp'	Video
2008	Jazz in the Diamond District	Blair Morgan	
2008	Jada	Terrance	
2008	American Dream	Old Skool	
2009	Man of Her Dreams	Senator Marcus Gordon	
2009	There's a Stranger in My House	Mr. John Moore	
2009	God Send Me a Man	Bishop	
2009	Steppin: The Movie	Detective Lewis	
2009	Just Another Day	Bowman	
2009	Before I Self Destruct	Sean	Video
2009	Busted	Leroy	
2009	Contradictions of the Heart	Damien	Video
2010	Preacher's Kid	Ike	
2010	Let God Be the Judge	Gabriel	
2010	When The Lights Go Out	Freddy	Video
2010	Heaven Ain't Hard to Find	Big Bill Herod	
2010	Trapped: Haitian Nights	Mike	
2010	Vigilante: The Hayward Brown Story	Henry Brown	
2010	Chain Letter	Coach	
2010	Love Me or Leave Me	Cecil	TV movie
2010	Something Like a Business	Sexy Silk	
2011	The Ideal Husband	Daniel	TV movie
2011	Street Kings 2: Motor City	Detective Tyrone Fowler	Video
2011	35 and Ticking	Zane	
2011	She's Not Our Sister	Rev. Beckley	TV movie
2011	The Perfect Gift	Michael Sr.	
2011	He's Mine Not Yours	Walter	
2011	The Saints of Mt. Christopher	Donald Ray Williams	
2011	23rd Psalm: Redemption	Lester Wayne	
2012	Dead Money	Leon	
2012	The Marriage Chronicles	Robert McDaniel	
2012	Nicki: A Hip Hop Love Story	Mr. Jamison	
2012	Supernatural Swamp Slaughter	–	
2012	Womack	Gilly Smalls	Short
2012	Note to Self	Coach Gerald Woodson	
2012	C'mon Man	Roosevelt Steele	
2012	Interludes	Blake	
2012	Somebody's Child	Dr. Sperry	TV movie
2012	The House of Malik	Uncle Kyle	
2012	The Undershepherd	Deacon Roberts	
2012	One Blood	Winston	
2013	Coffin Baby	Detective S. Jackson	
2013	Criminal Behavior	Cedric	
2013	They Die by Dawn	Deputy Sheriff	
2013	The Dempsey Sisters	Theo Dempsey	
2013	Shake	Red	
2013	Mutumbo the Lost Prince	Oscer	
2013	God's Precious Jewels	Joe Thomas	
2013	Forbidden Woman	Randall Trace	
2014	Blood Ransom	Detective Hobbs	
2014	99 North	Uncle P	
2015	Fear Files	Detective Owen Marsh	TV movie
2015	A Baby for Christmas	Gavin	TV movie
2015	The Freight Rider	William	Short
2015	Love Won't Let Me Wait	Bishop Buckworth	
2016	The North Star	Mr. Lee	
2016	A Weekend with the Family	Dingo Stankershet	
2016	Guns and Grams	Mr. Marshall	
2016	Banger	Chief Crans	
2016	Where Hearts Lie	Carl	
2016	Hunting Season	Thomas Curry	
2016	Flowers Movie	Mr. Waldell	
2016	Merry Ex-Mas	Pastor Jordan	TV movie
2016	King of Newark	Juice	
2017	Mountain Top	Larry Fletcher	
2017	The Preacher's Son	Bishop T.K. Wilson	
2017	The Cheaters Club	Marvin	
2017	Misguided Behavior	Captain Rogers	
2017	Love by Chance	Donald	
2017	The Hills	Captain Pearson	
2017	Schooling Life	President Adams	Short
2017	All Eyez on Me	Floyd	
2017	Chasing Titles Vol. 1	T Parker	Short
2018	Fade Away	Eazy	
2018	The Choir Director	Bishop T.K. Wilson	
2018	Easy Money	Mr. Miller	
2018	Couples' Night	Rich	
2018	Dogstar: High School 2	– (voice)	
2018	Sinners Wanted	One Eye	
2018	A Talent for Trouble	Mr. Wellington	
2018	5K1	Barry	
2018	Worth	Tony	
2018	Fatima's Revenge	Lt. Earl Garrison	
2018	Juug Gone Wrong	Mr. Johnson	
2018	Everything That Glitters	Fram	
2018	Sliders	Mr. Miller	
2018	Gangland: The Musical	Pastor Earl	
2019	Prodigal	Censear	
2019	Sins of the Father	Kevin	TV movie
2019	I Got the Hook Up 2	Tony Smooth	
2019	Diamond in the Rough	Pastor Davis	
2019	The Lick Movie	Richard Jacobson	
2019	Let Go and Let God	Donald	
2019	The Probe	Commissioner Davis	TV movie
2020	The Available Wife	Mitchell	
2020	Guns and Grams	Mr. Marshall	
2021	Saints & Sinners Judgment Day	Rex	TV movie
2021	Fruits of the Heart	Marcus	
2021	Envy: A Seven Deadly Sins Story	–	TV movie
2021	The House Next Door: Meet the Blacks 2	Angry Cop	
2021	Moonlight Soul	Greg Monaghan	
2022	Chocolate City 3: Live Tour	Mr. James Williams	
2022	Boxed In	Witt 'Pa' Scandrick	
2022	The Next 24 Hours	Max	
2023	The Dirty 3rd: Next Generation	Sugar Slim	
2023	The In Law Gang!	John Sr.	
2023	Recession Proof	Jackson Holloway	
2023	Player	Donti Player	
2023	Boxed In 2	Witt 'Pa' Scandrick	
2023	Gangster's Daughter 2	Ike Spencer	
2024	Skeletons in the Closet	Father Francisco	
2024	Once in a Valentine	William	
2024	Trap City	Goose	
2024	The Probe	Commissioner Davis	
2024	Hidden Lies	Hector	
2024	Negligence	Judge	
2024	Mufasa: The Lion King	Rhino (voice)	
2025	Capital Punishment: Part 1	Police Chief	
2025	Capital Punishment: Part 2	Police Chief	
2025	Return of the Mack	Detective Avery Calhoun	
2025	TKO	Hank	
2025	Sebastian	Captain Harris	
2025	Car Show Kings	Frank	
2025	Blowback	King	
TBA	Wrong Number †	—N/a	In production

=== Television ===
Year	Title	Role	Notes
1990	Tour of Duty	Luther Fraction	Episode: "Payback"
1990	Cop Rock	Cop	Episode: "Potts Don't Fail Me Now"
1990	Equal Justice	Mugger	Episode: "Promises to Keep"
1991	Gabriel's Fire	Admitting Clerk	Episode: "The Great Waldo"
1991	Matlock	Security Guard	Episode: "The Trial: Part 1"
1991	Jake and the Fatman	Director	Episode: "Nevertheless"
1991	Equal Justice	Jermaine Watkins	Episode: "Opening Farewell"
1992	Martin	Younger Cop	Episode: "The Great Payne Robbery"
1992–94	Roc	Andre Thompson	Guest: Season 1, Recurring Cast: Season 2-3
1993	In the Heat of the Night	Henry Cowen	Episode: "Leftover Man: Part 1 & 2"
1993	Thea	Ray Singer	Episode: "Dirty Laundry"
1993	Murder, She Wrote	Detective Eddie Flowers	Episode: "Lone Witness"
1993	NYPD Blue	Lewis Futrel	Episode: "Oscar, Meyer, Weiner"
1993–94	The Sinbad Show	Eddie	Recurring Cast
1994	South Central	Bobby Deavers	Recurring Cast
1994	Renegade	J.J. Corvell	Episode: "Way Down Yonder in New Orleans"
1995	Simon	John Doe	Recurring Cast
1995	Murder, She Wrote	Ralph Danton	Episode: "Big Easy Murder"
1996	Pacific Blue	Captain Brooks	Episode: "Pilot" & "First Shoot"
1996	Sports Theater with Shaquille O'Neal	Bob Williams	Episode: "4 Points"
1997	High Incident	–	Episode: "Black & Blue"
1997	Touched by an Angel	Mr. Burns	Episode: "Last Call"
1997	New York Undercover	Elvin Barnes	Episode: "Is It a Crime?"
1997	The Jamie Foxx Show	Mazi	Episode: "The Employee Formerly Known as Prince"
1997	NYPD Blue	Gerald/Frankie	Episode: "As Flies to Careless Boys..."
1997	Moesha	Harold Moss/Ray Stokes	Episode: "Mentor" & "Rhythm and Dues"
1998	In the House	Eddie	Episode: "Working Overtime: Part 1 & 2"
1999	The Wonderful World of Disney	Martin Luther King Jr.	Episode: "Selma, Lord, Selma"
1999	Ryan Caulfield: Year One	Lt. Keith Vaughn	Recurring Cast
2000	Walker, Texas Ranger	James Jackson	Episode: "Thunderhawk"
2000	Linc's	Suntza	Episode: "East Meets West"
2000	The Parkers	Mr. Alexander	Episode: "A Simple Plan"
2001	Moesha	R.C.	Episode: "Run, Mo, Run" & "Scary Marriage"
2002	One on One	Coach Guillory	Episode: "I Believe I Can Fly: Part 2"
2002	The Practice	Earl Johnson	Episode: "The Good Fight"
2003	Third Watch	Joy's Father	Episode: "10-13"
2003	Law & Order: Criminal Intent	Dempsey Powers	Episode: "Cuba Libre"
2005	House	Ken Hall	Episode: "Daddy's Boy"
2006	Eve	Yusef	Episode: "Daddy's Home" & "Daughter Don't Preach"
2006	CSI: Crime Scene Investigation	Terrance Crowley	Episode: "Burn Out"
2006	Day Break	Lt. Romero	Episode: "What If They're Stuck?"
2007	Shark	Ray Tillman	Episode: "Backfire"
2007	Numbers	Max Devane	Episode: "Chinese Box"
2008	Cold Case	Tom Bernard '08	Episode: "Glory Days"
2009–10	Army Wives	Terrence Price	Recurring Cast: Season 3, Guest: Season 4
2010	The Boondocks	1st Prisoner (voice)	Episode: "A Date with the Booty Warrior"
2011	The Mentalist	C.O. Earls	Episode: "Like a Redheaded Stepchild"
2011	She's Still Not Our Sister	Rev. Beckley	Main Cast
2011–12	Black Dynamite	Black Dynamite's Daddy (voice)	Recurring Cast: Season 1
2012	Awake	John Cooper	Episode: "Guilty"
2012	For Richer or Poorer	Mason	Recurring Cast
2012	The Garage	Marty P. Silverstein	Recurring Cast
2012	Unsupervised	Coach Durham (voice)	Recurring Cast
2013	JD Lawrence's Community Service	Bishop Nixon	Main Cast
2015	The Soul Man	Gooch	Episode: "Tell It Like It Isn't"
2015	Murder in the First	Ethan Rydel	Episode: "Schizofrenzy"
2015	Black Jesus	–	Episode: "False Witness"
2016	Mann & Wife	Bernard	Episode: "Miracle Mann"
2016–22	Saints & Sinners	Rex Fisher	Main Cast
2017	My Step Kidz	Mr. Stan Miller	Episode: "Pilot"
2017	Tales	Bob Davis	Episode: "F*ck the Police"
2018	Brockmire	Charles Sr.	Episode: "Platoon Player"
2018–19	Hawaii Five-O	Percy Grover Jr.	Episode: "Lele pu na manu like" & "Hewa ka lima"
2018–19	Black Lightning	Reverend Jeremiah Holt	Guest: Season 1, Recurring Cast: Season 2-3
2018–22	The Family Business	Uncle Lou	Recurring Cast: Season 1 & 4, Guest: Season 2
2019	American Soul	Herschel	Recurring Cast: Season 1
2020	Chase Street	Earl	Main Cast
2020–21	The Last O.G.	Big Mike	Recurring Cast: Season 3, Guest: Season 4
2021	The Urbans	DJ Frankie Snow	Episode: "The Good Broccoli Part 1 & 2"
2022	Mortal Truth	Sheriff McFadden	Episode: "Pilot"
2023	Legacy	Willy	Main Cast
2024	Fight Night: The Million Dollar Heist	Mushmouth Rowe	Recurring Cast
2025	BMF	Pastor Coleman	Episode: “Good Faith”
2025	Kingpin	Charles Berkshire	Recurring Cast
2025	High Potential	Mack Epps	Episode: "Behind the Music"
2026	Surviving Sasha	Haywood	Recurring Cast

=== Music videos ===
Year	Song	Artist	Role
1992	"Hazy Shade of Criminal"	Public Enemy	Defendant
1995	"California Love"	2Pac featuring Dr. Dre and Roger Troutman	Evil Tribal Chief
2005	"Caught Up"	Usher	Big Man

=== Video games ===
Year	Title	Role	Notes
2004	Grand Theft Auto: San Andreas	Melvin "Big Smoke" Harris	
2021	Grand Theft Auto: The Trilogy – The Definitive Edition	Melvin "Big Smoke" Harris	Archival recordings Remaster of Grand Theft Auto: San Andreas only
