= Rolando Molina =

Salvadoran actor

Rolando Conchas Molina
- Born: Rolando Alberto Argueta-Molina; August 13, 1971 (age 54); San Salvador, El Salvador
- Occupation: Actor
- Years active: 1992-present

Rolando Alberto Argueta-Molina (born August 13, 1971) is a Salvadoran actor.

== Life and career ==
Molina was born in El Salvador and immigrated to the United States at a very young age. The family settled in Los Angeles. Approached by Edward James Olmos while working as a security guard at Universal Studios one day; Rolando caught Olmos' attention and asked him to audition for his new film. His acting début was (a cameo) on Olmos' project at the time; American Me (1992). He has also been in other films such as Menace II Society (1993), Mojave Moon (1996), The Rich Man's Wife (1996), Next Friday (2000), Crazy/Beautiful (2001), Party Animalz (2004) and Six Thugs (2006). He also made guest appearances in Desperate Housewives as the biological father of Gabrielle Solis's legal daughter Juanita.

== Filmography ==
=== Film ===
Year	Title	Role	Notes
1992	American Me	Cop #2	
1992	Jamie's Secret	Gary	Short
1992	To Protect and Serve	Lenny	
1993	Menace II Society	Vato #1	
1995	Indictment: The McMartin Trial	Court Clerk	TV movie
1995	Virtuosity	Salesman in Videostore	
1995	In the Flesh	Beefy Cop	
1996	Eye for an Eye	Parent of Murdered Children Group #4	
1996	The Rockford Files: If the Frame Fits...	Ramon	TV movie
1996	The Rich Man's Wife	Gangbanger	
1996	Street Corner Justice	Ruben	
1996	Mojave Moon	Second Guy	
1997	Do Me A Favor	Hector	
1998	Primary Colors	Anthony Ramirez	
1998	The Pandora Project	Mr. Big / 'Jefe'	
1998	The Unknown Cyclist	Support Van Driver	
1998	Brown's Requiem	Ernie	
1999	EDtv	Warehouse Worker	
2000	Next Friday	Baby Joker	
2000	A Better Way to Die	Chach	
2001	Crazy/Beautiful	Hector	
2002	King Rikki	Javier	
2003	Bruce Almighty	Hood #4	
2003	Grind	Show Security	
2004	Party Animalz	Chewi	Video
2004	Cake	Benzito	Video
2005	Domino	Security Manager	
2005	Rumor Has It...	Mover	
2006	The Virgin of Juarez	Cop	
2006	Six Thugs	Chapo	
2007	Expired	Meters Money Collector	
2007	Delta Farce	Bartender	
2008	Eagle Eye	TSA Agent	
2008	Ladies of the House	Manny	TV movie
2010	Food Stamps	Angry Neighbor	
2010	Eventuality	The Intruder	Short
2010	Broken	Neighbor	
2011	Platinum Illusions	Oso	
2011	A Better Life	Jesus	
2012	Jewtopia	Ramone	
2013	The Advocates	Kevin Guzman	TV movie
2016	400 Miles	Rigo	Short
2017	Murder in the Woods	Jesus	
2018	Papi Chulo	Juan	
2019	Jane the Novela	Salvador Negremonte	TV movie
2021	Welcome to Our World	Fat Neighbor	

=== Television ===
Year	Title	Role	Notes
1993	Street Justice	Simmy	Episode: "Bitter Fruit"
1994	Seinfeld	Punk #1	Episode: "The Opposite"
1994	Living Single	The Waiter	Episode: "There's Got to Be a Morning After"
1995	The Wayans Bros.	Orson	Episode: "I'm Too Sexy for My Brother"
1995	Cybill	Grip	Episode: "Since I Lost My Baby"
1995	The Invaders	Raymond	Episode: "Part II"
1995-96	ER	Rolando	Recurring Cast: Season 1, Guest: Season 2
1996	Public Morals	DA	Episode: "The Green Cover"
1996	Pacific Blue	Munchkin	Episode: "Bangers"
1996-97	Dangerous Minds	Joker	Recurring Cast: Season 1
1997	Gun	Guard #1	Episode: "Columbus Day"
1997	Cracker	Neighbor	Episode: "Hell Hath No Fury"
1998	LateLine	Burly Techie	Episode: "Pearce's New Buddy"
1998	Dharma & Greg	Hector	Episode: "Are You Ready for Some Football?"
1998	NYPD Blue	Barfly #2	Episode: "Numb & Number"
1999	L.A. Doctors	Louis	Episode: "Baby, It's Cold Outside"
1999	Two Guys and a Girl	Grip	Episode: "Two Guys, a Girl and the Storm of the Century"
1999	Martial Law	Christian Rudecki	Episode: "My Man Sammo"
1999	G vs E	Dragon Fly Bouncer	Episode: "Lady Evil"
2000	Judging Amy	Mark Vasquez	Episode: "Spoil the Child"
2000	Charmed	Hernandez	Episode: "Reckless Abandon"
2000	Pacific Blue	Manolo	Episode: "A Thousand Words"
2000	7th Heaven	Juror	Episode: "Twelve Angry People"
2000	G vs E	Bennie	Episode: "Renunciation"
2000	Sammy	Various Roles (voice)	Episode: "Sammy Makes Amends"
2001	Walker, Texas Ranger	Randy Drago	Episode: "Without a Sound"
2001	Ladies Man	Iladio	Episode: "The 31-Inch-High Club"
2002	My Wife and Kids	Valet	Episode: "Table for Too Many: Part 1 & 2"
2002	Becker	Dad #2	Episode: "Let's Talk About Sex"
2002	The Shield	Hector Estanza	Episode: "Throwaway"
2002	Firefly	Bolles	Episode: "War Stories"
2003	NYPD Blue	Idalo Tavarez	Episode: "Laughlin All the Way to the Clink"
2003	Crossing Jordan	Hector Chirullo	Episode: "Sunset Division"
2004	The Handler	Jesus Linares	Episode: "Bleak House"
2005	Less than Perfect	Security Man	Episode: "You Can Leave the Lights On"
2005	Joan of Arcadia	Trash Man God	Episode: "Secret Service"
2005	Yes, Dear	Julio	Episode: "Broken by the Mold"
2005	Wanted	Idalo Tavarez	Episode: "Pilot"
2006	What About Brian	Bouncy Guy	Episode: "The Importance of Being Brian"
2006	CSI: Miami	Rulon Domingo	Episode: "Backstabbers"
2007	Dirt	Ozzy Romero	Episode: "Pap Smeared"
2007	Boston Legal	Miguel Obisbo	Recurring Cast: Season 4
2007	The Suite Life of Zack & Cody	Hector	Episode: "A Tale of Two Houses"
2007-16	American Dad!	Various Roles (voice)	Recurring Guest
2008	General Hospital	Sal Del Torro	Regular Cast
2009	Meteor	Mexican Trucker	Episode: "Episode #1.1 & #1.2"
2009	Heroes	Motel Clerk	Episode: "Chapter Eight 'Into Asylum'"
2009	Hawthorne	Brian	Episode: "The Sense of Belonging"
2010	Sons of Tucson	Vic	Episode: "Chicken Pox"
2010	The Closer	Tomas Medina	Episode: "Off the Hook"
2010	Look: The Series	Gary	Recurring Cast
2010	Desperate Housewives	Hector Sanchez	Recurring Cast: Season 7
2011	Southland	Chuy	Episode: "Punching Water"
2011	Sons of Anarchy	Benny	Episode: "Una Venta"
2012	Touch	Hector	Episode: "Entanglement"
2012	Harry's Law	Rodrigo	Episode: "Class War"
2013	Maron	Latino Guy	Episode: "Mexican Angel"
2013	Dexter	Armando	Episode: "This Little Piggy"
2013	Switched at Birth	Cop	Episode: "As the Shadows Deepen"
2014	Winners	Valet Attendant	Episode: "Complementary Valet"
2014	Rush	Raoul	Recurring Cast
2014	The Bridge	Father Salas	Episode: "Harvest of Souls"
2014-15	Justified	Aguilar	Guest Cast: Season 5-6
2014-18	Family Guy	Various Roles (voice)	Recurring Guest
2015	The League	Various Roles (voice)	Episode: "Adios y Bienvenidos"
2016	Rizzoli & Isles	Eduardo	Episode: "Hide and Seek"
2016	Code Black	Maintenance Man	Episode: "Corporeal Form"
2016	Agents of S.H.I.E.L.D.	Santino Noguera	Episode: "Lockup"
2016	Shameless	Jesus	Episode: "Happily Ever After"
2021	Animal Kingdom	Pete Trujillo Sr.	Episode: "Let It Ride"
