= Friday After Next =

2002 film directed by Marcus Raboy

- Theatrical release poster
- Directed by: Marcus Raboy
- Written by: Ice Cube
- Based on: Characters by Ice Cube; DJ Pooh
- Produced by: Ice Cube; Matt Alvarez
- Starring: Ice Cube; Mike Epps; John Witherspoon; Don "D.C." Curry; Anna Maria Horsford; Clifton Powell
- Cinematography: Glen MacPherson
- Edited by: Suzanne Hines
- Music by: John Murphy
- Production companies: New Line Cinema; Cube Vision; Avery Pix
- Distributed by: New Line Cinema
- Release date: November 22, 2002
- Running time: 85 minutes
- Country: United States
- Language: English
- Budget: $10 million
- Box office: $33.5 million

Friday After Next is a 2002 American stoner comedy film directed by Marcus Raboy (in his feature directorial debut) and starring Ice Cube (who also wrote the film), Mike Epps (in a dual role), John Witherspoon, Don "D.C." Curry, Anna Maria Horsford, and Clifton Powell as Pinky. It is the third installment in the Friday trilogy, following Friday (1995) and Next Friday (2000). It tells the story of Craig and his cousin Day-Day getting jobs as security guards at a shopping center when a robber dressed as Santa Claus breaks into their apartment and steals their presents and the rent money that is owed to their landlady. The film was theatrically released by New Line Cinema on November 22, 2002, to generally negative reviews, though it was deemed an improvement over its predecessor, while grossing $33.5 million against a $10 million budget. A fourth film is in early development.

== Plot ==
On the early morning of Christmas Eve, a robber disguised as Santa Claus breaks into cousins Craig and Day-Day's apartment. Craig tries to fend him off, while making failed frantic calls to a sleeping Day-Day. The robber escapes with Craig and Day-Day's Christmas presents and rent money. Craig and Day-Day then file a police report.

After the police leave, Craig and Day-Day are confronted by their landlady Ms. Pearly, who warns them that if they do not pay their overdue rent by the end of the day, she will evict them and send her son Damon, a newly released ex-convict who developed homosexual tendencies in prison, after them. Craig and Day-Day then start their first day jobs as security guards for Moly, who is the owner of a squalid doughnut shop and the shopping center that they are to patrol.

The shopping center is also the home of a BBQ rib restaurant called "Bros. BBQ", co-owned by the cousins' fathers Willie and Elroy. Shortly after they come on duty, the power goes to Day-Day's head, and he begins hassling some carolers, forcing Craig to keep him in line. The two and Elroy are then robbed by the same robber from their apartment, who gets away. The two then meet Donna and her pimp Money Mike, who run a fledgling clothing shop called 'Pimps and Hoes'.

Soon after, a couple of drug-addicts try to shoplift from Pimps and Hoes store, but Craig and Day-Day catch them and turn them over to the police. Mike offers them a cash reward, but Craig refuses it and instead invites him to his and Day-Day's Christmas Eve party.

As Craig and Day-Day are on their lunch break, a gang of thugs (the grandsons of the carolers that Day-Day earlier ran off) chase after them. After failing to catch them, the thugs beat up Moly for supposedly hiding them, resulting in Craig and Day-Day getting fired, despite being on their break at the time. As revenge, Willie calls the Department of Health on Moly.

Later that night, Craig and Day-Day convert their Christmas Eve party into a rent party to recoup their stolen rent money. Many of Craig and Day-Day's friends and family show up including Money Mike and Donna, Day-Day's ex-boss Pinky, and Damon. While Money Mike is in the bathroom, he is confronted by Damon who attempts to sexually assault him, but fails when Money Mike crunches his testicles with pliers. With the bathroom occupied, Craig tells Willie to ask Ms. Pearly if he can use hers. Ms. Pearly attempts to seduce Willie, but Craig's mother Betty catches and attacks them both. After Money Mike lets go of Damon, Damon chases him through the neighborhood after Donna drives off without him.

Craig and Day-Day see the robber, ambush him inside his hideout and chase him around the neighborhood, running into obstacles until he is eventually hit by Pinky's limousine. Craig and Day-Day retrieve their stolen rent money and Christmas presents, and tie the robber up on his roof, leaving him for the police.

Ms. Pearly calls the police on the party, but Craig and Day-Day buy them off with marijuana. Day-Day hooks up with two of Pinky's girls before Betty walks in on him. Craig convinces Donna to return to the party and the two end up having sex.

== Cast ==
- Ice Cube as Craig Jones, a slacker who gets a job as a security guard.
- Mike Epps as:
  - Daymond "Day-Day" Jones, the cousin of Craig who gets a job as a security guard
  - "Crazy Old Man with Shotgun"
- John Witherspoon as William "Willie" Jones, the father of Craig and uncle of Day-Day who now co-owns a rib restaurant called "Bros' BBQ".
- Don "D.C." Curry as Elroy Jones, the father of Day-Day and uncle of Craig who now co-owns a rib restaurant called "Bros' BBQ".
- Anna Maria Horsford as Betty Jones, the mother of Craig, wife of Willie, and the aunt of Day-Day who helps out at "Bros. BBQ".
- Clifton Powell as "Pinky", the former boss of Day-Day.
- Bebe Drake as Ms. Pearly, Craig and Day-Day's landlady who likes Willie.
- K. D. Aubert as Donna, an employee of Money Mike who Craig falls for.
- Sommore as "Cookie", a waitress at "Bros' BBQ" who is Elroy's latest girlfriend after he and her sister Suga broke up.
- Rickey Smiley as Robber Santa Claus that runs afoul of Craig and Day-Day.
- Joel McKinnon Miller as Officer Alvin Hole
- Reggie Gaskins as Officer Brian Dix
- Terry Crews as Damon "Double / Triple O.G." Pearly, the tough ex-con son of Ms. Pearly who has homosexual tendencies.
- Starletta DuPois as Sister Sarah
- Katt Williams as Mike "Money Mike", a pimp who runs a shop called "Pimps and Hoes".
- Maz Jobrani as Moly, the proprietor of a squalid doughnut shop called Holy Moly Doughnuts and property manager of the shopping center who Craig and Day-Day work for.
- Brian Stepanek as Officer Bailey
- Delores Jones as Grandma Jones, the mother of Willie and Elroy and the grandmother of Craig and Day-Day who hasn't been acting normal ever since Willie slapped her on the head during a "Bros' BBQ" commercial due to the restaurant's catchphrase "Taste so good, makes you want to slap yo mama!"
- Gerry Bednob as Moly's Father
- Frances Gray as Sister Faye
- Don "Magic" Juan as Himself
- Chris Williams as Bill "Broadway Bill", a man who tries to rob "Pimps and Hoes".
- Erica Vittina Phillips as Pat "Booster Pat", a woman and Broadway Bill's partner who tries to rob "Pimps and Hoes".
- Khleo Thomas as Bad Boy #1
- Daniel Curtis Lee as Bad Boy #2
- Terence Washington as Crime Brother #1
- Kelly "K-Mac" Garmon as Crime Brother #2
- Wayne King as Crime Brother #3
- Malieek Straughter as Crime Brother #4
- Crystal Mattison as "Mo' Wet", one of the girls that Pinky brings to Craig and Day-Day's rent party.
- Trina McGee as "Cinnamon", one of the girls that Pinky brings to Craig and Day-Day's rent party and considers her a "spice girl".
- Nikki Davis as "Lollipop", one of the girls that Pinky brings to Craig and Day-Day's rent party.
- Lendell "Kebo" Keeble as C.W., Pinky's chauffeur.

== Production ==
Justin Pierce, who played Craig and Day-Day's friend Roach in Next Friday, was originally written to be in this film, working with Craig and Day-Day as security guards, but committed suicide before filming began. Filming began on November 1, 2001, and wrapped in January 2002.

== Reception ==
=== Box office ===
Friday After Next grossed $13 million in its opening weekend, finishing third at the box office. It made $7.4 million in its second weekend (including $10.6 million over the five-day Thanksgiving frame), falling to sixth. It went on to gross $33.5 million worldwide.

=== Critical response ===
On Rotten Tomatoes, the film holds an approval rating of 26% based on 72 reviews, with an average rating of 4.2/10. The site's critical consensus reads: "This Friday installment is more shapeless and stale than its predecessors." On Metacritic, the film has a weighted average score of 35 out of 100, based on 24 critics, indicating "generally unfavorable" reviews. Audiences polled by CinemaScore gave the film an average grade of "B+" on an A+ to F scale.

Roger Ebert of the Chicago Sun-Times gave it two out of four and wrote: "I guess there's an audience for it, and Ice Cube has paid dues in better and more positive movies (Barbershop among them). But surely laughs can be found in something other than this worked-over material." Ernest Hardy of L.A. Weekly called it "Loud, chaotic and largely unfunny," and Jay Boyar of the Orlando Sentinel wrote: "To call this film a lump of coal would only be to flatter it."

Kevin Thomas of the Los Angeles Times gave it a positive review: "Fast and raunchy, Friday After Next surely stands apart from other holiday-themed movies for its gleeful low-down humor and a raft of uninhibited characters involved in one outrageous predicament after another."

== Soundtrack ==
Friday After Next is the soundtrack from the film of the same name. It peaked at number 23 on the Top R&B/Hip-Hop Albums.

== See also ==
- List of Christmas films
- List of hood films
