= Don Curry =

American actor and stand-up comedian

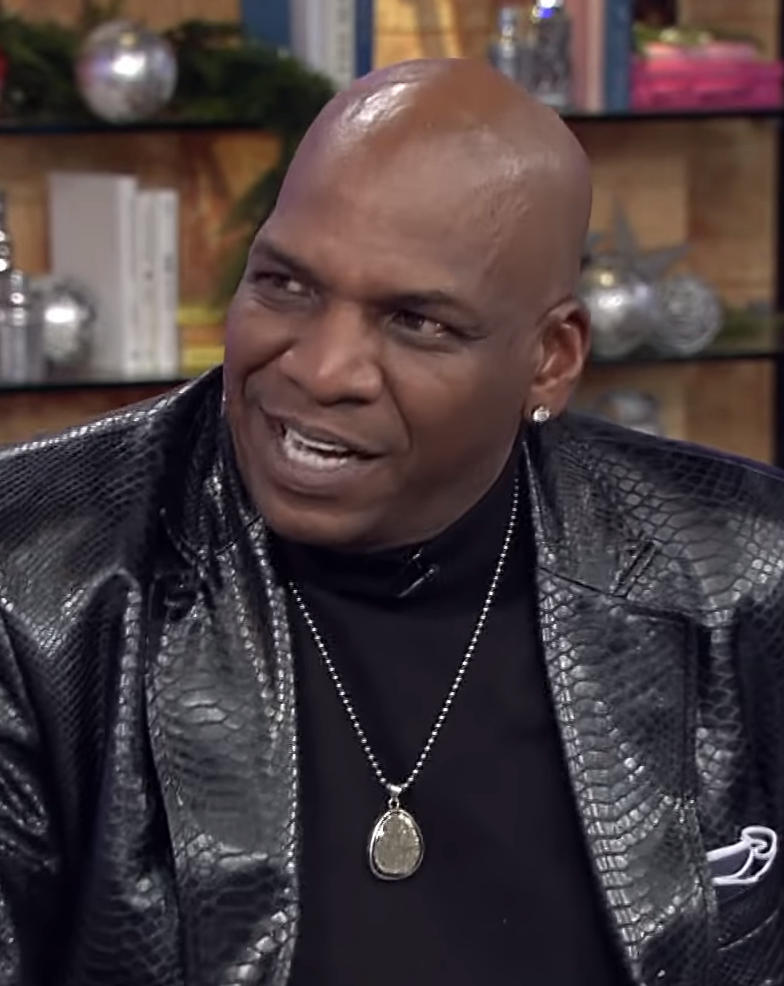
- Curry in 2018
- Born: Donald Curry; September 7, 1958 (age 68); Denver, Colorado, U.S.
- Occupations: Actor, stand-up comedian
- Years active: 1988–present

Don Curry (born September 7, 1958) is an American actor and stand-up comedian. He is best known for starring as Craig's sex-crazed Uncle Elroy Jones in Next Friday and Friday After Next and for his role on the sitcom Grace Under Fire.

== Early life ==
Curry's father is Dr. L. K. Curry, pastor emeritus of Emmanual Baptist Church in Chicago. Curry's mother, Dorothy, died in 2003.

== Career ==
In 2000, Curry portrayed Craig's sex-crazed Uncle Elroy Jones in Next Friday. He reprised his role in the 2002 Christmas follow-up Friday After Next.

In 2010, Curry was featured in the Boondocks season 3 episode The Color Ruckus in which he voiced Uncle Ruckus' physically abused but cruel minded father Mister. In 2013, he hosted BET's Comic View. Curry had hosted Comic View from 1996 to 1997; he also appeared on the show as a performer many times, when he first got his start in comedy.

== Filmography ==
=== Film ===
Year	Title	Role	Notes
1988	Spyder	TV News Announcer	
1989	Blackbelt II	TV News Announcer	
1998	Three Sickxty	Marcus	
2000	Next Friday	Uncle Elroy	
2001	Two Degrees	Wes	
2002	Friday After Next	Uncle Elroy	
2005	Tears of a Clown	Cole Black	
2009	You Don't Tell I Won't Tell	Skeeter	
2014	Funny Business	Reggie	TV movie
2015	She Wins	Uncle Dre	
2021	Strip Off	Uncle Don	

=== Television ===
Year	Title	Role	Notes
1997-98	Grace Under Fire	D.C.	Main cast: season 5
2001	The Steve Harvey Show	T-Bone	Episode: "No Free Samples"
2004	The Tracy Morgan Show	Pastor Jones	Episode: "Church"
2007	Everybody Hates Chris	Cooper	Episode: "Everybody Hates Math"
2010	The Boondocks	Mister Ruckus (voice)	Episode: "The Color Ruckus"
2014	Black Jesus	City Councilman Bowers	Recurring cast: season 1
2023	The Ms. Pat Show	Tony Free	Episode: “Pat on Tour” & “Down With the King”
