= Angela Means =

American comedian, model, and actress

- Occupations: Actress; comedian; model
- Years active: 1992–2008
- Children: Brad Kaaya

Angela Means is an American actress, comedian, and model. Her best-known works include Friday (1995), in which she played the role of Felisha. She gained popularity when a phrase from the film – "Bye, Felisha" – gained media coverage and became a meme. She also starred in House Party 3 (1994) and Nickelodeon's Cousin Skeeter.

== Early life ==
Means grew up on a farm near Ann Arbor, Michigan. She was born to a Jewish father and mother of Nigerian descent.

== Career ==
=== Acting and modeling ===
Means began her modeling and acting career at the age of 19. Her first acting gigs were in In Living Color (1990–94), Hangin' with Mr. Cooper (1992–97), and Bad Girls of Def (1993–94). She then played a lead role in House Party 3 (1994) and appeared in The Cherokee Kid (1996). In 1998 until 2001, she was a series regular on Nickelodeon's Cousin Skeeter.

Notably, she played the role of Felisha in the Ice Cube-wrote 1995 film Friday, which garnered internet attention much later for the phrase "Bye, Felicia".

=== Comedy ===
Means began performing stand-up comedy at the age of 24, toured with the late Bernie Mac and Chris Rock, and joined Def Comedy Jam's nationwide tour.

=== Chef ===
Means later began a career as a vegan chef. In September 2017, she opened Jackfruit Cafe, a vegan soul food restaurant in Los Angeles.

Means has written a vegan cookbook and a horror novel: 85 Vegan Recipes, Seven Sinner and the Angel Who Loved Them.

== Personal life ==
Means has a son, Brad Kaaya, who was drafted in the sixth round of the 2017 NFL draft by the Detroit Lions.

Means grew up vegetarian and later became vegan.

== Filmography ==
=== Film ===
Year	Title	Role	Notes
1994	House Party 3	Veda Pratt	
1995	Friday	Felisha	
1996	The Cherokee Kid	Harriet	TV movie
1997	Sprung	Sista #2	

=== Television ===
Year	Title	Role	Notes
1992	Def Comedy Jam	Herself	Episode: "Episode #2.2"
1992–94	In Living Color	Herself	Recurring Cast: Season 4, Guest: Season 5
1993	It's Showtime at the Apollo	Herself	Episode: "Episode #6.15"
1993	Hangin' with Mr. Cooper	Officer Houston	Episode: "Valentine's Day Massacre"
1998–2001	Cousin Skeeter	Vanessa Walker	Main Cast
