= Friday (1995 film) =

1995 film directed by F. Gary Gray

- Theatrical release poster
- Directed by: F. Gary Gray
- Written by: Ice Cube; DJ Pooh
- Produced by: Patricia Charbonnet
- Starring: Ice Cube; Chris Tucker; Nia Long; Tiny "Zeus" Lister Jr.; Regina King; Anna Maria Horsford; Bernie Mac; John Witherspoon
- Cinematography: Gerry Lively
- Edited by: John Carter
- Music by: Frank Fitzpatrick; Hidden Faces
- Production companies: New Line Productions; Cube Vision
- Distributed by: New Line Cinema
- Release date: April 26, 1995
- Running time: 91 minutes
- Country: United States
- Language: English
- Budget: $3.5 million
- Box office: $27.4 million

Friday is a 1995 American buddy stoner comedy film directed by F. Gary Gray and written by Ice Cube and DJ Pooh. The film stars Ice Cube and Chris Tucker alongside Nia Long, Tiny "Zeus" Lister Jr., Regina King, Anna Maria Horsford, Bernie Mac, and John Witherspoon. The film follows Craig Jones (Cube) and Smokey (Tucker), two unemployed friends who face troubles after becoming indebted to a drug dealer while also contending with the neighborhood bully in South Central Los Angeles.

While developing Friday, Ice Cube and DJ Pooh sought to counteract the violent portrayal of hood films and drew on personal experiences when writing the screenplay. Preparations for Friday began after the pair were able to secure funding from New Line Cinema, who granted finance in exchange for a seasoned comedian in one of the lead roles; Ice Cube and DJ Pooh quickly settled on Tucker during casting. The film was Gray's film directorial debut, who was previously known as a music video director.

Friday was theatrically released in the United States on April 26, 1995, by New Line Cinema. It received positive reviews from critics, many of whom praised the comedic sequences, writing, and acting performances, particularly Cube's and Tucker's, resulting in what's considered to be Tucker's breakout role. The film was also a commercial success, grossing $27 million worldwide. The film subsequently obtained a large 1990s cult following, inspiring several internet memes and pop-culture references and launched a media franchise, with the sequels Next Friday (2000) and Friday After Next (2002). The film distinguished itself as one of the few Hollywood productions with an all-Black principal cast and crew.

== Plot ==
Craig Jones, a recently fired and unemployed slacker living in South Central Los Angeles, spends Friday with his best friend Smokey, a small-time drug peddler. The pair smoke a brokered consignment of marijuana, which Smokey was tasked to sell for his drug supplier, Big Worm.

Big Worm attempts to collect his money from Smokey, who accidentally involves Craig. He then subjects both to his ultimatum: if they are unable to repay him $200 by 10:00 that evening, Craig and Smokey will be killed.

Craig attempts to borrow money from several people, including his mother Betty, his sister Dana, and jealous girlfriend Joi, who refuses under the assumption that Craig is being unfaithful with local drug addict and mooch Felisha and her sister Debbie. Craig retrieves a gun to walk Smokey home, but his father, Willie, tells him that he needs to use his fists instead of weapons to help himself.

Smokey sells some drugs to Hector, a former smoking buddy. At the same time, Deebo, the neighborhood bully, forces Smokey to break into their neighbor Stanley's house to burglarize. They manage to steal $200, which Deebo decides to keep for himself.

Smokey attempts to retrieve the money from Deebo, who is asleep with Felisha at her house, but fails due to interference from the petty thief Ezal. Seeing Deebo awake, Craig and Smokey notice a car driving slowly, and, suspecting a drive-by shooting, they hide in Craig's room for the evening. After failing to contact Big Worm, and with 10:00 PM approaching, they return outside but are forced to evade Big Worm's men as they are sitting in a black van with the headlights off, starting a shootout.

After the shootout, the neighbors come out of their houses upon hearing the gunshots. Debbie confronts Deebo for beating Felisha, assuming Felisha was behind Smokey's attempted theft. As Craig and Smokey arrive, Deebo starts bullying Debbie and punches her, knocking her to the ground, leading to a physical altercation between him and Craig. Craig is victorious by defeating him on Debbie's behalf.

Smokey steals $200 from the incapacitated Deebo while Red punches him as revenge (for previously punching him and stealing his bicycle and gold chain) and retrieves both the items. Debbie tends to Craig's wounds. At midnight, Craig breaks up with Joi over the phone in favor of Debbie. Willie also informs Craig that his former supervisor has called and wants to see him tomorrow about his job.

Smokey settles his debt with Big Worm, telling him he will no longer sell drugs and is set to enter rehabilitation. Smokey then smokes a joint and ends the movie by looking at the camera and saying, "I was just bullshittin'! And you know this, man!"

== Cast ==
- Ice Cube as Craig Jones
- Chris Tucker as "Smokey"
- Nia Long as Debbie
- Tiny "Zeus" Lister Jr. as Deebo
- Anna Maria Horsford as Betty Jones
- Regina King as Dana Jones
- Paula Jai Parker as Joi
- John Witherspoon as William "Willie" Jones
- Bernie Mac as Pastor Clever
- Angela Means as Felisha
- Faizon Love as "Big Worm"
- Anthony Johnson as Ezal
- Yvette Wilson as Rita
- Lawanda Page as Jehovah's Witness
- Vickilyn Reynolds as Joann
- DJ Pooh as "Red"
- Tony Cox as Mr. Parker
- Kathleen Bradley as Mrs. Parker
- Demetrius Navarro as Hector
- Reynaldo Rey as Red's Father
- Ronn Riser as Stanley
- Justin Revoner as Kid #1
- Meagan Good as Kid #2
- Terri J. Vaughn as China
- F. Gary Gray as Store Employee
- James Bose Smith as Chris "Lil Chris"
- WC as Drive-By Shooter
- Michael Clarke Duncan as Craps Player (uncredited)

== Production ==
Before Friday's release, movies such as Boyz n the Hood (also starring Ice Cube) and Colors portrayed life in the hood as violent and menacing. Ice Cube and DJ Pooh felt that these films did not portray the full picture of living in the hood, missing a more lighthearted element, with Ice Cube later saying, "we had fun in the hood. We used to trip off the neighborhood." Therefore, Cube and DJ Pooh decided to create a film that would portray that environment.

The script was only the third Ice Cube had ever written; the previous two were undeveloped. With the film, Ice Cube intended to make a "hood classic", one that could be "[watched] over and over and over again". According to Ice Cube, a majority of the film is autobiographical, with much of it being based on events that occurred in his neighborhood growing up. Smokey was based on DJ Pooh's stint as a drug dealer, while Craig being fired on his day off was based on Ice Cube's cousin, who was working as a delivery driver for United Parcel Service (UPS) at the time.

Prior to writing, the duo realized their inexperience as filmmakers was unlikely to attract major film studios, and floated the idea of self-financing the film. For a time, the idea of making the film in black and white to save money was considered, before the pair decided on approaching New Line Cinema about producing the film, who had achieved success with the House Party series; a film-type the duo aimed to replicate.

New Line Cinema agreed to finance the production, but requested that the role of Smokey, initially to be played by DJ Pooh, be played by someone with more experience. Chris Rock and Tommy Davidson were also considered for the role of Smokey. Ice Cube and Pooh immediately decided on Tucker, after discovering the comic through Def Comedy Jam. However, Tucker's first audition was poorly received, but was granted more time to try again at a later date. Tucker soon contacted Angela Means, aiming to work with her acting coach, but she invited him to a workshop session over dinner to help him secure the role. According to Means, "by the time that spaghetti was gone, Chris was Smokey."

Ice Cube was granted license to select the film's director, and decided on F. Gary Gray, who was a music video director. Gray had previously worked with Ice Cube on a number of occasions and was also aiming to establish a foothold in Hollywood through a short film. Ice Cube instead offered him the role for Friday, attracted to the fact that he and Gray had similar backgrounds, feeling the director would accurately capture the film's aesthetic.

Gray said that Ice Cube starring in a comedy "scared the shit out of me," as he doubted whether audiences would buy into Cube portraying a role so different from his public persona. Gray explained, "Ice Cube was the toughest man in America, and when you take someone [who] delivers hard-hitting social issues in hardcore gangsta rap, and who has a hardcore view on politics, you would never think comedy."

== Release ==
Friday was released on April 26, 1995, in the United States, June 30, 1995, in the United Kingdom, and October 5, 1995, in Australia. The film saw a limited, theatrical re-release in honor of its 20th anniversary on April 20, 2015, for one night only.

=== Home media ===
The film was released on VHS on October 10, 1995, on DVD on March 2, 1999, and on Blu-ray on September 8, 2009.

== Reception ==
Box office

Friday grossed $6,589,341 on its opening weekend debuting at #2 in the box office in 865 theaters, averaging $7,617 per theater. The film grossed $27,467,564 in North America, against a budget of $3.5 million.

Critical Response

Rotten Tomatoes gives the film an approval rating of 77% based on 30 reviews, with an average rating of 6.4/10. The site's critical consensus reads, "What Friday might lack in taut construction or directorial flair, it more than makes up with its vibrant (albeit consistently crass) humor and the charming, energetic performances of its leads." Metacritic gives the film a score of 54 out of 100, based on 9 reviews, indicating "mixed or average" reviews.

== Legacy ==
The film has obtained a large cult following since its release. A scene in the film is the source of the internet meme "Bye, Felicia"—which is a phrase meant to dismiss an inconsequential person. Former Pittsburgh Steelers linebacker James Harrison and San Francisco 49ers wide receiver Deebo Samuel are both nicknamed Deebo in reference to the character from the film.

Director Quentin Tarantino counted Friday as one of his 20 favorite movies from 1992 to 2009.

American rapper Kendrick Lamar referenced the character Deebo after a line about NBA player DeMar Derozan who is nicknamed Deebo and is also a native of California in his 2024 song "Not Like Us", a diss track aimed at Canadian rapper Drake, drawing parallels between himself and the character.

=== Sequels ===
The film's success spawned two sequels: Next Friday (2000) and Friday After Next (2002). A fourth installment, tentatively titled Last Friday, has been in the works for several years. The film also inspired an animated series, titled Friday: The Animated Series, which aired in summer 2007.

The sequel Next Friday was the most successful in the franchise, grossing a total of $59.8 million worldwide.

In addition, the Los Angeles Rams released a short video paying homage to Friday entitled Thursday as promotion ahead of the 2026 NFL Draft set outside the same house. It featured Ice Cube's son O'Shea Jackson Jr., who played his father in Straight Outta Compton, Tucker's son Destin, Terry Crews (Damon in Friday After Next) as Deebo and Rams players including Kevin Dotson as Big Worm.

== See also ==
- List of hood films
