= Anna Maria Horsford =

American actress

- Born: New York City, U.S.
- Education: High School of Performing Arts
- Occupation: Actress
- Years active: 1968–present

Anna Maria Horsford is an American actress, known for her performances in television comedies.

Horsford is best known for her roles as Thelma Frye on the NBC sitcom Amen (1986–91), and as Dee Baxter on the WB sitcom The Wayans Bros. (1995–99). She had dramatic roles on the FX crime drama The Shield playing A.D.A. Beth Encardi, and CBS daytime soap opera The Bold and the Beautiful as Vivienne Avant, for which she was nominated for the Daytime Emmy Award for Outstanding Special Guest Performer in a Drama Series in 2016 and Outstanding Supporting Actress in a Drama Series in 2017.

Horsford appeared in a number of movies, most notable as Craig Jones' mother Betty in the 1995 comedy film Friday and its sequel Friday After Next (2002). Her other film credits include Times Square (1980), The Fan (1981), Presumed Innocent (1990), Set It Off (1996), Along Came a Spider (2001), Our Family Wedding (2010), and A Madea Christmas (2013).

== Early life ==
Horsford was born in Harlem, New York City to Victor Horsford, an investment real estate broker originally from Barbuda and Lillian Agatha (née Richardson) Horsford, who emigrated from Antigua and Barbuda in the 1940s. She grew up in a family of five children.

Horsford attended Wadleigh Junior High School and the High School of Performing Arts. After high school, she got into acting through the Harlem Youth for Change program.

Her first job out of high school was with the Joe Papp’s Public Theater, a part in Coriolanus at the Delacorte in Central Park.

According to a DNA analysis, she has maternal ancestry from the Limba people of Sierra Leone.

== Career ==
Her first major role in television was as a producer for the PBS show Soul!, hosted by Ellis Haizlip, which aired between 1968 and 1973. One of her first TV appearances was in 1973 on the first run syndication game show of To Tell the Truth where she was an imposter for Laura Livingston, one of the first female military police. Horsford made guest appearances on such sitcoms as The Fresh Prince of Bel-Air, Sparks, Moesha, The Bernie Mac Show, The Shield, Girlfriends, and Everybody Hates Chris. She had main roles on the sitcoms The Wayans Bros. as "Dee Baxter" and "Thelma Frye" on Amen. She appeared on the drama Judging Amy.

More recently, she was seen in the first season of Grey's Anatomy. She returned to the big screen in the 2013 film A Madea Christmas. She portrayed Helen on the BET sitcom Reed Between the Lines.

Horsford currently has a recurring role as Vivienne Avant on The Bold and the Beautiful. For the role, she was nominated for Outstanding Special Guest Performer in a Drama Series in the 43rd Daytime Emmy Awards.

She began playing a recurring role on B Positive in the show's second-season premiere.

She also has appeared in the TBS sitcom The Last O.G. featuring Tracy Morgan, as a recurring character (Tray's mother).

== Personal life ==
On October 29, 2011, Horsford was awarded the title of Ambassador of Tourism of Antigua. She is also a member of Sigma Gamma Rho sorority.

== Filmography ==
=== Film ===
Year	Title	Role	Notes
1979	An Almost Perfect Affair	Amy Zon	
1979	Hollow Image	Monica	TV movie
1980	Times Square	Rosie Washington	
1981	The Fan	Emily Stolz	
1981	Bill	Ms. Marge Keating	TV movie
1982	Muggable Mary, Street Cop	Kathy Thomas	TV movie
1982	Benny's Place	Charmaine	TV movie
1982	Love Child	Mara	
1983	Class	Maggie	
1984	Crackers	Slam Dunk	
1984	A Doctor's Story	Leigh Williams	TV movie
1985	St. Elmo's Fire	Naomi	
1985	Stone Pillow	Collins	TV movie
1986	Nobody's Child	Nurse Betty	TV movie
1986	A Case of Deadly Force	Virginia Cates	TV movie
1986	Permanent Wave	Eva	Short
1986	Heartburn	Della	
1986	C.A.T. Squad	Mrs. Raines	TV movie
1987	Street Smart	Harriett	
1987	If It's Tuesday, It Must Be Belgium	–	TV movie
1988	Who Gets the Friends	Hillary Adams	TV movie
1989	Taken Away	Mrs. Pierson	TV movie
1990	Presumed Innocent	Eugenia	
1990	A Killer Among Us	Barbara Evans	TV movie
1992	Murder without Motive: The Edmund Perry Story	Veronica Perry	TV movie
1993	Mr. Jones	Judge Harris	
1994	Baby Brokers	Randi	TV movie
1995	Friday	Betty Jones	
1995	Once Upon a Time...When We Were Colored	Miss Annie	
1996	Widow's Kiss	Lavanda Harrison	TV movie
1996	Dear God	Lucille Barnett	
1996	Set It Off	Ms. Wells	
1996	One Fine Day	Evelyn	
1996	Circle of Pain	–	TV movie
1997	Kiss the Girls	Vickie Cross	
1999	At Face Value	Mosetta	Short
2000	Dancing in September	Sitcom Mom	
2000	Nutty Professor II: The Klumps	Denise's Mother	
2000	Lockdown	Saunders	
2000	Masquerade	Mrs. Scott	TV movie
2001	Along Came a Spider	Vickie	
2001	Jacked	Thelma Barnes	
2001	How High	Mamma King	
2002	Minority Report	Casey	
2002	Friday After Next	Betty Jones	
2004	Justice	Chief Public Defender Poole	
2004	Guarding Eddy	Carol	
2005	My Big Phat Hip Hop Family	Mamma Pearl	
2005	Ganked	Mrs. Barry	Video
2006	Gridiron Gang	Sharon Weathers	
2006	Broken Bridges	Loretta	
2007	Trade	Detective Martinez	
2007	I Tried	Milly	
2010	Our Family Wedding	Diane Boyd	
2010	Wigger	Ruth	
2012	C'mon Man	Mrs. Woods	
2013	Tyler Perry's A Madea Christmas	Eileen Murphy	
2017	Gladys Brown	Gladys Brown	Short
2017	Chasing the Blues	Mrs. Walker	
2017	A Kindred Soul	Claudia	Short
2018	The Choir Director	Deaconess Moss	
2018	Single AF	Jane	
2021	Vacation Friends	Nancy	
2021	The Bitch Who Stole Christmas	Mayor Coont	TV movie
2022	Me Time	Connie	
2024	Will I See You Again?	Barbara Lewis	Short

=== Television ===
Year	Title	Role	Notes
1977	The Doctors	Lily (a Group Therapy Patient)	episodes airing on Dec. 5th, & 13th, 1977
1978	NBC Special Treat	Ginnie Sheridan	Episode: "The Tap Dance Kid"
1979	Guiding Light	Clara Jones	Regular Cast
1980	3-2-1 Contact	Officer Dobbs	Recurring Cast: Season 1
1981	ABC Afterschool Specials	Jessica	Episode: "Starstruck"
1982	Nurse	Joleen	Episode: "The Store"
1982	All My Children	Jesse's Attorney Mrs. Matthews	Episode: "Episode dated 4 October 1982"
1983	The Firm	Sergeant Johnson	Episode: "Pilot"
1984	ABC Afterschool Specials	Stephanie Marshak	Episode: "Summer Switch"
1985	American Playhouse	Hannah	Episode: "Charlotte Forten's Mission: Experiment in Freedom"
1986–1991	Amen	Thelma Frye	Main Cast
1987	The Bronx Zoo	Mrs. Devlin	Episode: "It's Hard to Be a Saint in the City"
1991	Baby Talk	Cynthia Willoughby	Episode: "Womb with a View"
1991	L.A. Law	Judge Olga Winbush	Episode: "Do the Spike Thing"
1992	The Fresh Prince of Bel-Air	Karen Carruthers	Episode: "Geoffrey Cleans Up"
1992–1993	Rhythm & Blues	Veronica Washington	Main Cast
1992–1993	The Addams Family	Additional Voices (voice)	Recurring Cast
1993	Tall Hopes	Lainie Harris	Main Cast
1995–1999	The Wayans Bros.	Deirdre "Dee" Baxter	Main Cast: Season 2–5
1996	Sparks	Wilma's Aunt	Episode: "How Papa Got His Groove Back"
1997	Good News	–	Episode: "Pilot"
1998	L.A. Doctors	Angela Daly	Episode: "Pilot" & "Under the Radar"
1998	7th Heaven	Joyce	Episode: "Here Comes Santa Claus"
1999	The Wild Thornberrys	Gola's Mother (voice)	Episode: "Chimp off the Block"
1999	Judging Amy	Defense Attorney Charles	Episode: "Crowed House"
2000	Moesha	Diane Henderson	Episode: "The Candidate"
2002	The Chronicle	Jolene Freewald	Episode: "Touched by an Alien"
2004	The Bernie Mac Show	Aunt Sis	Episode: "Family Reunion"
2004	The District	Yates	Recurring Cast: Season 4
2004	Method & Red	Dorothea	Main Cast
2005–2006	Entourage	Saigon's Mother	Guest Cast: Season 1–2
2005–2007	Grey's Anatomy	Elizabeth Fallon	Guest Cast: Season 1 & 3
2005–2008	The Shield	A.D.A Beth Encardi	Recurring Cast: Season 4 & 7
2006	Heist	Wanda Evans	Episode: "How Billy Got His Groove Back"
2007	All of Us	Vicky Black	Episode: "Everything Happens for a Reason"
2008	Las Vegas	Aunt Vonice	Episode: "Three Weddings and a Funeral Part 2"
2008	Everybody Hates Chris	Hattie Mitchell	Recurring Cast: Season 3
2009	Cold Case	Geraldine Watkins '09	Episode: "Soul"
2010	American Dad!	Female Juror (voice)	Episode: "The People vs. Martin Sugar"
2011	Funny or Die Presents	Anna Maria	Episode: "Episode #2.6"
2011	Let's Stay Together	Jacqueline/Raynelle	Recurring Cast: Season 1
2011–2015	Reed Between the Lines	Helen Wilson	Main Cast: Season 1, Guest: Season 2
2012	Key and Peele	Maid	Episode: "Dueling Magical Negros"
2012	The League	Trina Richardson	Episode: "Training Camp"
2012	New Girl	Charmaine	Episode: "Katie"
2015	It's Always Sunny in Philadelphia	Janet Barrett	Episode: "The Gang Goes on Family Fight"
2015	The Soul Man	Ceci	Episode: "Mo Momma, Mo Problems"
2015–2018	The Bold and The Beautiful	Vivienne Avant	Regular Cast
2017	New Girl	Charmaine	Episode: "Misery"
2018	I Feel Bad	Norman's Mom	Episode: "My Kid Has to Grow Up"
2018–2019	Mom	Ms. Ferguson	Guest Cast: Season 6–7
2019–2021	The Last O.G.	Roberta Barker	Recurring Cast: Season 1–3, Main Cast: Season 4
2020	Sunnyside Up	Aunt Deedee	Recurring Cast
2020	The Conners	Nicole	Episode: "Plastics, Trash Talk & Darlene Antoinette"
2020	Ghost Tape	Gramma Missy	Recurring Cast
2020–2022	Studio City	Jolene Hernandez	Recurring Cast: Season 1, Guest: Season 2
2021	Hacks	Francine	Episode: "1.69 Million"
2021	Pose	Charlene	Recurring Cast: Season 3
2021–2022	B Positive	Althea Ludlum	Recurring Cast: Season 2
2022	The Guardians of Justice	Serena Lyle	Main Cast
2023	History of the World, Part II	Mother Mary	Episode: "II"
2023	Bel-Air	Nita Banks	Episode: "Let the Best Man Win"
2024	No Good Deed	Denise	Recurring Cast

== Live performances ==
=== Theater ===
Year	Title	Role	Notes
1995	"Dancing on Moonlight"	Neptune	Keith Glover, playwright. Marion McClinton, director. The eight-member ensemble included Terry Alexander, André de Shields, Kevin Jackson and Horsford. The play opened at the Joseph Papp Public Theater.

== Awards and nominations ==
List of acting awards and nominations
Year	Award	Category	Title	Result	Ref.
1988	Image Awards (NAACP)	Outstanding Lead Actress in a Comedy Series	Amen	Nominated	
2005	Black Reel Award	Best Actress – Network/Cable Television	Justice	Nominated	
2016	Daytime Emmy Award	Outstanding Special Guest Performer in a Drama Series	The Bold and the Beautiful	Nominated	
2017	Daytime Emmy Award	Outstanding Supporting Actress in a Drama Series	The Bold and the Beautiful	Nominated	
2021	Daytime Emmy Award	Outstanding Guest Performer in a Daytime Fiction Program	Studio City	Nominated	

== In popular culture ==
Horsford has been featured on the cover of several magazines, including:

- TV Guide, August 29 – September 4, 1987, issue #1796. Cover photograph featured Sherman Hemsley and Anna Maria Horsford of NBC's Amen.
- Jet Magazine, November 23, 1987. Cast members, including Horsford, are featured on the cover. Article titled "Fun-filled Amen still one of hottest TV shows”.
- TV Guide, February 3, 1990, Four television shows are featured including Amen with photo of Horsford and Clifton Davis. Article titled "Oh, what a week! February is off with a bang."
- Jet Magazine, February 5, 1990. Cover photo and article: "Clifton Davis and Anna Maria Horsford Tie Knot on TV's Amen"
- Jet Magazine, May 13, 1991, Photo and cover article feature Clifton Davis and Horsford. Article titled "New baby and guest star James Brown climax fifth season of TV’s Amen."
- Solo Magazine, 2011 Holiday Issue. Cover photograph and article: Anna Maria Horsford: Brings the Laughs and Drama to new BET Show.
