= Rango (bull) =

American bucking bull (2007-2014)

- Breed: American Bucking Bull
- Sex: Bull
- Born: April 10, 2007
- Died: September 14, 2014 (aged 7); Hospital
- Nationality: United States
- Years active: 2010–2014
- Owners: Jeff Robinson, Center Point Ranch
- Parents: Playboy Skoal (sire); CPR Candess (dam)
- Weight: 1500 lb (680 kg)
- Appearance: Black with white face and white markings

Rango #718 (April 10, 2007 – September 14, 2014) was an American bucking bull who competed in the Professional Bull Riders (PBR) circuit. He was a three-time PBR Built Ford Tough Worlds Finals qualifier. He was also the star bull of the 2015 film The Longest Ride and has a credit in the movie.

== Background ==
#718 Rango was born on April 10, 2007. He was owned by Center Point Ranch, then by Jeff Robinson Bulls. Robinson bought Rango from Center Point Ranch in 2011. Robinson found the bull was very athletic and had great kicks. Robinson, who had been voted PBR Stock Contractor of the Year four times, said Rango was his favorite bull. Robinson had hauled and bucked 100s of bulls at an elite level, and he considered Rango second best at bucking, but he was his No. 1 favorite.

== Career ==
Rango bucked on the elite Built Ford Tough Series (BFTS) tour of the PBR. Rango spent the years from 2011 to 2014 mainly on the BFTS tour.

=== 2011 season ===
Rango bucked at his first BFTS event in Oklahoma City, Oklahoma. He bucked off a total of 10 riders that year. Some notable outs were bucking off Wagner Luciano in 1.30 seconds with a 46-point bull score at a PBR Touring Pro Division (TPD) event in Asheville, North Carolina. Another was bucking off Rubens Barbosa in 5.11 seconds at the BFTS event in Springfield, Missouri, for a 45-point bull score. Another was bucking off Valdiron de Olivieira in 4.11 seconds at the BFTS event in Charlotte, North Carolina, for a 46-point bull score.

=== 2012 season ===
In 2012, Rango bucked on the BFTS 21 times, and was only ridden three times. Austin Meier rode him for 91 points at the Iron Cowboy III in Arlington, Texas. Rango for his part was scored 44.50 points in this out.

"He was sure something special," Meier recalled. "(I am) honored to be one of the few guys that rode him. He was a bull rider's kind of rank bull (with) no tricks – just honest, smart and rank. When you rode him you smiled and when you got slammed by him you tipped your hat to him because he just flat bucked you off by being rank, not by cheating you or using dirty moves. I loved getting on him and watching him too."

Rango was also ridden by Matt Bohon for 86.25 points at the BFTS event in Kansas City, Missouri, while being given a 42.75-point bull score. He qualified for the PBR Built Ford Tough World Finals in Las Vegas, Nevada, and was ridden there by Emilio Resende for 87 points while being given a bull score of 43 points.

=== 2013 season ===
In 2013, Rango bucked 36 times. Only two riders made qualified rides on him this season. João Ricardo Vieira rode him for 91.75 points at the 15/15 Bucking Battle in Grand Rapids, Michigan, and Rango had a bull score of 45.25. Brant Atwood rode Rango for 90.75 points at the PBR World Finals, and Rango's bull score was 45.25.

=== 2014 season ===
In 2014, Rango was successfully ridden seven times. He was first ridden by PBR world champion J.B. Mauney at the BFTS event in Duluth, Georgia, for 91 points, while Rango was given a 45-point bull score. He was then ridden by Marco Eguchi at the 15/15 Bucking Battle in Oklahoma City, Oklahoma, for 90.75 points while being given a bull score of 44.75. Rango was successfully ridden by Marcho Eguchi again, this time at the BFTS event in Albuquerque, New Mexico, for 92.75 points and was given a bull score of 45.75. He was then ridden by PBR world champion Silvano Alves at the 15/15 Bucking Battle in Fresno, California, for 89.50 points while receiving a bull score of 43.75. Rango was next ridden by PBR world champion Guilherme Marchi at the BFTS Last Cowboy Standing event in Las Vegas, Nevada. This resulted in the same 89.50 rider score and 43.75 bull score. He was next ridden by PBR world champion Mike Lee at the Touring Pro Division event in Asheville, North Carolina, for 88 points. Rango was given a bull score of 44 points. He was then ridden again by PBR world champion Silvano Alves at the BFTS event in Nashville, Tennessee, for 92.25 points while receiving a bull score of 45.25. "He is a good bull to draw," Alves said. "I rode him one time before break (15/15 Bucking Battle in Fresno, California, for 89.5 points), and he was good. I got a good score and a good ride today." Alves’ successful ride on Rango in Nashville would turn out to be the bull's final career out.

=== Additional career information ===
Rango consistently went on tour with Bushwacker and Asteroid; he might have won the PBR World Champion Bull title otherwise. He still was always considered a top 5 or top 10 bucking bull.

Rango was scored a high bull score of 47 points in the PBR three times. First, in 2012 at the Touring Pro Division event in Asheville, North Carolina, against Skeeter Kingsolver, bucking him off in 6.30 seconds. Second, in 2013 at the BFTS Last Cowboy Standing in Las Vegas against L.J. Jenkins, bucking him off in 2.06 seconds. Lastly, in 2014 came Austin Meier, being bucked off in 3.59 seconds at the Touring Pro Division event in Fayetteville, North Carolina.

PBR Livestock Director Cody Lambert said Rango bucked off some of the most tenacious BFTS bull riders. "There is not one guy in his career that rode him that wasn't a contender for a world championship, except for the day he bucked against Matt Bohon in Kansas City." Lambert added. "In his career, that was his only off day and (Bohon) was still 86.25 points."

== The Longest Ride ==
The film adaptation of Nicholas Sparks' best-selling novel of the same name premiered in theaters on April 10, 2015. The film is a story about a fictitious superstar PBR bull rider, and featured Rango as its star bull. The bull even had a film cast credit. Rango serves as a nemesis to protagonist Luke Collins, played by Scott Eastwood. Real-life PBR contestants rode the bulls, including Rango, as stunt-doubles. Jeff Robinson was beginning to see more fame for his bull after he starred in the film.

Reece Arnold, who worked for Robinson, hauled Rango to Jacksonville, North Carolina, and Winston-Salem, North Carolina, for two weeks of filming in the mid-summer of 2014. It turned out that Rango liked the spotlight. During filming, he became a star. He even received praise from the producer Marty Bowen, the director George Tillman Jr., and the rest of the movie cast and employees. Per Arnold, Rango was meant for the big screen. "Rango stood out down there more than any of the other bulls because it was almost like he knew when the cameras was rolling." Arnold said. "He knew when they needed him to trot around the arena and turn around and look at the camera."

== Death and legacy ==
On September 14, 2014, Rango died in the morning. He had been admitted to the hospital for intestinal issues, then experienced heart troubles, which were life ending.

Cody Lambert contacted Jeff Robinson the next day after Rango's death; Robinson had scores of contacts regarding Rango. Everyone had high regard for the bull.

Robinson was still grieving the next day after Rango died. The face of his operation, yes, but also an authentic member of his family was gone. There was no bull waiting in the morning for him. Rango was a playful bull. He loved to dig holes. He would move secretly from his pen by lifting the gate handle with his horns. He loved taunting the other bulls, especially I'm A Gangster Too. When Robinson prepared to bury his faithful friend, another tear came down. His five-year-old son came up to console him. "He came up to me and rubbed my back and said, 'Daddy, it is time for you to be a big boy now. Rango has gone to heaven." They buried Rango on their Mars Hill, North Carolina, property.

Marco Eguchi had two 90 points rides on Rango, out of three outs. Both 90-point rides were in 2014. He called Rango the best bull on the BFTS. "Not only for me, but for all lovers of PBR, this week (we) lost a star of the arena," he said. "We talk about best rank bulls in the world – he was certainly one of them. I was very sad about the news and have good memories when watching my rides on him. My condolences to Jeff Robinson and fans."

"Great bull", PBR world champion J.B. Mauney said, "was always one you wanted to have in the short round; bulls like Rango don't come around often." 2004 PBR World Champion Mike Lee echoed Mauney's sentiments, calling Rango one of the best bulls in the PBR at one time. "He was big, strong, got a lot of air," Lee said. "He would kick high and he was really showy and fun to watch. Rango himself enjoyed his job. He rolled up into the alley and his eyes were wide checking everything out." "The time I got him he leaned on the chute gate and it was like he was watching the gateman out of the corner of his. He really liked his job and he was ready to start. He was one of a kind. You don't come across them kind of bulls very often."

PBR Chairman and CEO, Jim Haworth, said the bull was one of their best performers, who will be greatly missed. Rango was a favorite among the bull riders, who were glad to face him due to great potential for a qualified ride to earn them a winning score. The PBR conducted a special tribute to Rango during its 2014 Built Ford Tough World Finals at the Thomas & Mack Center in Las Vegas, Nevada in October 2014. The bull's popularity was testified by popular culture, including a posable "Rango" bull figure.

Rango is a member of the ProBullStats Hall of Fame.

== Career summary ==
Rango had an average bull score of 44.73. He bucked in 66 events. His buckoff percentage was 84%. His average rider score was 90.06. He had 68 outs, mostly on the BFTS. His average buckoff time was 3.69 seconds. He had 36 scores that were 45 points or more. He qualified for the Built Ford Tough World Finals three times.
