= Bonner Bolton =

American model (born 1987)

- Born: Bonner Bolton; June 1, 1987 (age 39); Odessa, Texas, U.S.
- Occupations: Fashion model, former bull rider
- Years active: 2007–present

Bonner Bolton (born June 1, 1987) is an American fashion model and former professional rodeo cowboy who specialized in bull riding. He won the 2007 world championship for the now-defunct Championship Bull Riding (CBR) organization. He also competed in the Professional Bull Riders (PBR) and Professional Rodeo Cowboys Association (PRCA) circuits. He placed fourth at the PBR World Finals in 2015. He performed as a stunt double for Scott Eastwood in the movie The Longest Ride, being the only one of four doubles who managed to make a virtually eight-second ride on the PBR top ranked bull Rango for an ending scene. His bull riding career was cut short by a neck injury sustained during a dismount from a bull he had just finished making an eight-second ride on at a PBR Built Ford Tough Series (BFTS) event in January 2016. He sustained a break to his C-2 vertebra. Bolton was temporarily paralyzed, but made a full recovery. The parent company, IMG, of the PBR made an offer to contract him as a fashion model in May 2016. Bolton now works steadily as a fashion model.

== Early life ==
Bonner Bolton was born on June 1, 1987, in Odessa, Texas. He was raised on a ranch located between Odessa and Gardendale, Texas, where he learned to train horses and continues to help out. His parents are Toya and Sally Bolton. He has two brothers, Brody and Bridger. He also has two sisters, Brylee and Bliss. He received his education from Odessa College and Texas Tech University through bull riding scholarships.

Bolton is a second generation cowboy. His family has owned their ranch since 1903. His father, Toya Bolton, was a professional rodeo cowboy for 15 years (20 years total) and helped train Bonner. Toya won the George Paul Memorial in his professional bull riding days in 1991. When Bonner weighed enough, he approached his father about riding a bull. His brother, Brody, is also a bull rider, but gave it up for some time to be a saddle bronc rider. Bonner joined the junior rodeo when he was 10 years old. He now makes his home outside Dallas, Texas. He won his bull riding world title at age 20.

== Bull riding career ==
=== Championship Bull Riding ===
Bolton spent 14 years bull riding. He competed on the CBR tour from 2005 through at least 2013, perhaps longer. He qualified for the CBR World Finals five times, from 2007 through 2011. In 2011, he won the CBR event in Las Vegas, Nevada. In 2013, he won the CBR event in Hobbs, New Mexico.

In January 2008, Bolton won the Findlay Toyota Championship Bull Riding world title, as well as the finals event average at the South Point Hotel and Casino in Las Vegas, Nevada. He was one of only three riders to cover all his bulls during that season's finals. Bolton made a qualified ride on Rafter Jack and scored 88.5 points on him in the second round. Combined with his 84-point ride on Black Mamba from Friday's first round, it qualified him for the championship round. Bolton then scored a very high score of 94.5 points on The Air Up There to win. The amount won on his three bulls pushed him to $54,100, which was more than any other rider. For his year-end total he grossed the most earnings, which is what made him the world champion title holder.

In 2013, Bolton made his first appearance on that year's CBR season tour. He rode every bull he drew, winning a Hy-O-Silver buckle and a monetary prize. He rode his first bull Bring da Wood for 87.5 points. Next, he rode Cash Daddy for a high score of 90 points in the semi-final round. In the finals, there were four men competing, with Bolton having the highest score going in. He rode his bull last for a high score of 91 points and brought in the Hobbs championship win.

=== Professional Bull Riders ===
Bolton competed on the PBR circuit from 2007 to 2016.

He competed in the Velocity Tour event at the Yakima Valley Sundome in Yakima, Washington on February 14–15, 2015. In the championship round he won with a high 90.5 point ride. He accrued 80 points towards the world standings. Winning the Yakima event became his second Velocity Tour win in the 2015 season.

In March 2015, Bolton came in fourth place at the Fresno, California Invitational, a Built Ford Tough Series (BFTS) elite tour event. He got a qualified ride from two of his three bulls. He won the championship round with a high score of 88.25 on the bull LL Cool J, his best regular-season performance.

In October 2015, Bolton came back from an injury to compete on the BFTS again. The event this time was the Cooper Tires Take the Money and Ride, presented by Jack Daniel's at the Tucson Convention Center in Tucson, Arizona. Bolton scored a qualified ride from the bull Painkiller of 87.75 points to win the first round. He accrued 100 points towards the world standings. Prior to this event, he missed six BFTS events after incurring a right clavicle fracture back in Biloxi, Mississippi, earlier in the year. He was 35th in the world standings before this event, but the Round 1 victory here pushed him to 32nd and helped him qualify for the PBR World Finals.

After the regular season ended, Bolton finished up in the PBR BFTS world standings on the bubble for the PBR World Finals at No. 34. The top 35 riders go to the world finals, so Bolton just made the cut. It was the first time he had gotten inside the top 35 of the PBR world standings. Despite his previous injuries, he still managed to qualify for the finals, right inside the cut line.

Bolton finished up in fourth place in the PBR World Finals at the Thomas and Mack Center in Las Vegas, Nevada, which concluded on Sunday, October 25, 2015.

Bolton's 2015 season was his best to date. He climbed into the top 35 of the PBR World Standings. He finished the season at a career best of 28th in the world. In his rookie season on the BFTS, he set several career highs: 12 qualified rides, 37 attempted rides, a 32.43 percent riding average, and five top-ten finishes. He did sustain a sprained right MCL in Round 5 of the finals, though, so potentially he might have placed higher or won. In Vegas, he recorded his first BFTS 90+ point ride on the bull Walk Off which won him Round 2 and $30,000. This ride was the third-highest scored ride of the finals. His fourth-place finish at the finals was significant when his injuries and his absence from six events are taken into account. His final season standings at 28th place guaranteed him eight BFTS events in 2016.

=== The Longest Ride ===
In mid-2014, The Longest Ride (2015), a film adaption on the Nicholas Sparks novel, started filming. The main character, Luke, is played by actor Scott Eastwood. Luke is an injured PBR bull rider making his way up the ranks of the Professional Bull Riders into the PBR's exclusive Built Ford Tough Series. He also struggles with his nemesis, a top-ranked bull named Rango. The PBR signed as technical advisor and produced all of the bull riding events. Four then-active BFTS bull riders acted as stunt doubles for Eastwood: Bonner Bolton, Josh Faircloth, Markus Mariluch and Billy Robinson.

Eastwood's doubles had to ride a real, top-ranked PBR bull named Rango, who was also named Rango in the movie. To grasp the difficulty of making a qualified ride on him, by the time the now deceased bovine had finished his PBR career, in 75 total attempts, only 12 bull riders had gotten a qualified ride. On August 9, 2014, they were at the Lawrence Veterans Memorial Coliseum in Winston-Salem, North Carolina, where all four riders (Bolton last) attempted the bull to film a comeback scene where Luke attempts to ride Rango in one of the final scenes of the movie. Bolton recalled that it was an intense moment in his career: a qualified (eight-second) ride was required for filming, and the production was relying on success. Bolton's ride was just short of eight seconds but was sufficient for filming purposes.

=== Broken neck ===
On Sunday, January 10, 2016, on the final day of the season opener, the Chicago Invitational at the Allstate Arena, Bolton was leading the event. Prior to the final day of the event, Sunday, he was two for two on his previous bulls. Then Sunday, he rode the bull Cowboy Up for an 86.75-point ride. After completing the ride, Bolton mistimed his dismount, cartwheeled in mid-air, and landed on his head. Cowboy Up nearly stomped him but he was rescued by the bull fighters. Bolton was conscious, but had no feeling from his neck down. He was put on an ambulance and taken to Advocate Lutheran General Hospital in Park Ridge, Illinois. Once there, doctors determined he broke his C-2 vertebra, but his spinal cord remained intact. On Tuesday, doctors operated on Bolton to fuse-spinal fusion-his C2 and C3 vertebrae, inserting into the bones a metal brace. By this time, Bolton had all the feeling and movement back in his body, but he was required to remain completely still for a month. He wore a neck collar for several months, but was still physically active once allowed to leave the hospital, helping a friend install flooring and taking long walks. He noted: "“I'm told I may lose 10 to 15 percent of the movement in my neck. But that's a diagnosis for the average patient. Not everyone's as determined as I am."

The Rider Relief Fund and Cowboys Helping Cowboys assisted him financially during this crucial time. "I've received some unbelievable love and support," Bolton observed. "We're all family in this sport. Everybody helps everybody else. That's the cowboy way." While initially he was told he could get back to bull riding in 4–6 months, a few months later, Bolton's sports doctor told him, "The way they put the metal in your neck, it's right next to your main artery. If you break something against your third vertebra, you're dead or paralyzed. I will never release you to ride".

== Fashion modeling ==
On April 15, 2015, WME/IMG, now known as Endeavor, signed an agreement to acquire the Professional Bull Riders (PBR). In 2015, photographer Cass Bird took portraits of the bull riders at the world championship and, on May 19, 2016, IMG Models noticed and signed Bolton to a global modeling contract. Since signing with IMG, he has posed for Saks Fifth Avenue and posed shirtless for a Br4ss underwear campaign. He also appeared in a print ad campaign for Boot Barn's County Chic apparel. In July 2017, American Eagle Outfitters named Bolton as one of the new faces of its new collection, "The New American Jean", to be shot by Cass Bird. Bolton is now "The Cosmo Guy" featured in the August issue of Cosmopolitan.

== Dancing with the Stars ==
On March 1, 2017, Bolton was announced as one of the celebrity contestants to compete on the 24th season of Dancing with the Stars and was partnered with Sharna Burgess. On May 8, 2017, Bolton and Burgess were eliminated, coming in fifth place.
