= Justin McBride =

American bull rider (born 1979)

Justin Travis McBride (born August 7, 1979) is an American former professional rodeo cowboy who specialized in bull riding, and competed in the Professional Bull Riders (PBR) circuit. He was the 2005 and 2007 PBR World Champion, has a record 32 career PBR Premier Series event wins, and was the first professional bull rider to earn more than $5 million in the course of his career.

After retiring from bull riding, McBride was a full-time color commentator for the PBR's Premier Series telecasts from 2009 through 2024.

In 2022, McBride became the head coach of the Nashville Stampede in the PBR Team Series. The Stampede won the inaugural Team Series Championship title that year. In 2026, they became the first PBR Team to win a second Championship.

McBride also had a brief career as a country music singer-songwriter, releasing two studio albums and one live album.

In 2023, McBride was ranked No. 1 on the list of the top 30 bull riders in PBR history.

== Early and personal life ==
Justin McBride was born in Belton, Texas, later moving to Mullen, Nebraska, with his parents and older brother. His father worked on a ranch and rode bulls; his maternal grandfather was killed in a bull-riding event the year before McBride was born. McBride excelled at bareback bronc and bull riding, played eight-man football and wrestled. He attended the University of Nevada, Las Vegas on a rodeo scholarship; he left after a year to go pro at 19.

McBride currently lives in Whitesboro, Texas, with his wife, Jill, and their two children.

== Contestant career ==
McBride recalls his debut in the PBR's rookie league, the Touring Pro Division, as 'rough'. When he qualified for the Bud Light Cup Series (BLC) (then the name of the PBR's top tour) in 1999, he finished fourth in his first-ever Premier Series event, which was held in Bakersfield, California. He claimed his first win in his next event, which was in Odessa, Texas. Coupled with two more third-place finishes (one in Albuquerque, New Mexico, and one in Reno, Nevada), he qualified for his first PBR World Finals and finished 14th in the world in his rookie year of 1999, with $89,007 in earnings.

In 2000, McBride had several top finishes, but no wins. His biggest successes of that year came when he won the Mossy Oak Shootout twice - once in Greensboro, North Carolina, for $15,000, and again in Houston, Texas, for $30,000. He finished ninth in the world in 2000, with $144,764 in earnings, and was named the Mossy Oak Shootout Champion that year.

In 2001, McBride stepped up his game and won five events that year, putting himself into a three-man race for the PBR world championship title against Adriano Moraes and Ty Murray. Unfortunately for McBride, he faltered at the World Finals (as did Murray) and the Brazilian, Moraes, ended up winning his second world title that year. McBride finished third in the world that year, winning $302,217 for his efforts.

In 2002, McBride did not get to match the success he had in 2001, but he still won the BLC event in Nashville, Tennessee, and finished fifth in the world overall that year. He made $181,546 that year.

2003 saw a whole new Justin McBride. He put himself into a tight two-man race between himself and Chris Shivers for the world title that year, winning two Built Ford Tough Series (BFTS) events in the process (Anaheim, California, and St. Louis, Missouri). McBride was in the lead for the world title going into the Built Ford Tough Series event in Grand Rapids, Michigan, but unfortunately, disaster struck. He was stepped on by a bull named Mission Pack in the short-go of that event, breaking two ribs and puncturing a lung. Many thought McBride would not make it to the World Finals, but he did go. He won the first go-round and very nearly took the title away from Shivers, but when McBride bucked off of Mossy Oak Mudslinger in the short-go of the Finals, Shivers was awarded the PBR world title and the first ever million-dollar bonus that was awarded to a world champion. McBride finished second overall in 2003 with $281,606 in earnings.

In 2004, McBride picked up where he left off and won four events that year. His main rivals for the world title that year were Adriano Moraes and Mike Lee. He stayed in second place for most of the year, but due to a new points system implemented for the Finals that year, it would be possible for him to catch the leader (who at that point was Moraes, who had a 1,800-point lead heading into the Finals). However, for the second year in a row, disaster struck for McBride in Grand Rapids. This time, in that event's Mossy Oak Shootout, the bull named Lefty stepped on his right ankle as he was bucked off, breaking it. McBride would need surgery and again, people thought he would not make it to the World Finals. He did, three weeks later, and turned in some heroic performances early on. Unfortunately, he bucked off his last few bulls and ended up fourth overall in the world that year. He made $303,928 in 2004. Lee would go on to win the PBR world championship that year in a historic come-from-behind performance.

In 2005, McBride would not be denied. He won six BFTS events, tying a record originally set by Cody Hart in 1999 (the same year Hart won his PBR world title). In the middle of the year, McBride found himself in a heated race for the PBR world title with Brazilian rider Guilherme Marchi. The two battled it out at the PBR World Finals, and the short-go actually came down to Marchi and McBride. The pressure was on McBride after Marchi successfully made the whistle on the bull Kid Rock. McBride answered by hanging for dear life to the bull Camo, off the side for much of the ride, but nevertheless rode the bull successfully. McBride had overcome adversity and finally won his first-ever PBR world title in 2005, with over $1.5 million in earnings for the year, a PBR record at the time.

With the monkey off his back, McBride decided he would have fun in 2006. He maintained a consistent riding average and had several top finishes. He even won $25,000 in the Mossy Oak Shootout at the BFTS event in Tampa, Florida. In the middle of the year, he took time off to spend time with his wife, Jill, who gave birth to their new daughter, Addisen Claire McBride. McBride took six events off, but when he came back, he was still in the mix for a world title. He won three BFTS events upon his return (and in two events rode two previously-unridden bulls in the short-go rounds), but the Finals did not go as well as he had hoped. He still earned $232,757 that year and finished sixth overall.

In 2007, McBride chased a second world title. He won a record eight events on the BFTS that year, and battled it out with second-year pro J.B. Mauney for the world title. At the BFTS event in Chihuahua, Mexico, McBride hung up to the bull named Gnash and suffered a serious left shoulder injury that was first meant to put him out for the year, but he then came back two events later in Greensboro, North Carolina, to win his eighth event of the year, which is the current PBR record for most Premier Series events won in a single season (a feat which would later be tied by José Vitor Leme in 2021). He was also named the Alphatrade National Champion of 2007 and successfully rode the bull, Scene of the Crash, for $200,000 at the BFTS event in Columbus, Ohio, making it the richest ride in PBR history. He finished this season by winning his second PBR world title in three years. As in 2005, he did it riding the bull named Camo in the final round; unlike in 2005, McBride stayed on top of the bull without hanging on the side. His total season earnings in 2007 was $1,836,002. Due to the shoulder injury, though, McBride elected to have surgery after the Finals, and was out of competition for about six months after the surgery.

McBride came back to the BFTS at the 2008 Dickies American Worker of the Year Invitational in Dallas, Texas, and finishing seventh overall at the event. He seemed to pick up where he left off. He showed the world he was back for sure when he won the very next event, which was the Express Classic in Tulsa, Oklahoma, pocketing over $30,000 in that one weekend. He later went on to win the Jack Daniels Invitational in Nashville, Tennessee, and in doing so, secured himself yet another qualification for the PBR World Finals. A few events later, McBride achieved another milestone, breaking the $5 million mark in PBR career earnings; the first rider to ever do so. However, shortly before the Finals, having qualified 15th in the standings, McBride announced that he would retire at the end of the season to concentrate on his second career in country music, saying, "I don't wanna do it anymore." He put on a show at the 2008 PBR World Finals, riding five out of eight bulls (including two go-round wins) to finish sixth overall at the event. His final ride saw him bucked off Voodoo Child, the bull that he rode in Tulsa for the event win earlier in the year, ending his final season ranked 21st in the world with $221,090 in earnings. McBride acknowledged the crowd and walked away happy that he would not have to ride again.

However, McBride did come out of retirement for two more special bull rides. In 2014, at a special event known as RFD-TV's The American, which was held at AT&T Stadium in Arlington, Texas, he faced off against NFL defensive end Jared Allen's bull, Air Time, in a bonus ride, but was bucked off in less than two seconds. Then, on May 30, 2015, he competed in a special event called "Unfinished Business" (which took place during the J.W. Hart Challenge at the Wise County Sheriff's Posse Arena in Decatur, Texas), which featured McBride and other PBR legends coming back to attempt one more bull; there, he was bucked off a bull called Oyster Creek in just over three seconds.

=== Event wins ===
==== 1999 ====
- Top Guns Bull Riding Champion (Odessa, Texas)

==== 2001 ====
- Ty Murray Invitational Champion (Albuquerque, New Mexico)
- Colorado Open Co-Champion (Colorado Springs, Colorado)
- Grand Rapids Open Champion (Grand Rapids, Michigan)
- Justin Bull Riding Champion (Houston, Texas)
- Baltimore Open Champion (Baltimore, Maryland)

==== 2002 ====
- Bullnanza Nashville Champion (Nashville, Tennessee)

==== 2003 ====
- Anaheim Open Champion (Anaheim, California)
- St. Louis Open Champion (St. Louis, Missouri)

==== 2004 ====
- Phoenix Invitational Champion (Phoenix, Arizona)
- Jerome Davis Challenge Co-Champion (Greensboro, North Carolina)
- Indianapolis Invitational Champion (Indianapolis, Indiana)
- Tacoma Classic Champion (Tacoma, Washington)

==== 2005 ====
- Worcester Open Co-Champion (Worcester, Massachusetts)
- Jacksonville Open Co-Champion (Jacksonville, Florida)
- St. Louis Open Champion (St. Louis, Missouri)
- Heart of the West Ford Stores Invitational Champion (Reno, Nevada)
- Ty Murray Invitational Co-Champion (Albuquerque, New Mexico)
- NILE Invitational Champion (Billings, Montana)

==== 2006 ====
- Fritos Invitational Champion (Dallas, Texas)
- U.S. Army Invitational Champion (Reading, Pennsylvania)
- Rocky Boots Invitational Champion (Columbus, Ohio)

==== 2007 ====
- Sacramento Classic Champion (Sacramento, California)
- Southern Ford Dealers Invitational Champion (Tampa, Florida)
- New Orleans Classic Champion (New Orleans, Louisiana)
- Cabela's Classic Champion (Kansas City, Missouri)
- Cabela's Shootout Champion (Omaha, Nebraska)
- Built Ford Tough Invitational Champion (Auburn Hills, Michigan)
- Dickies Invitational Champion (Dallas, Texas)
- U.S. Army Invitational Champion (Greensboro, North Carolina)

==== 2008 ====
- Express Classic Champion (Tulsa, Oklahoma)
- Jack Daniel's Invitational Champion (Nashville, Tennessee)

== Music career ==
In 2007, McBride started a career as a country music singer. Just a week before the 2007 PBR World Finals, he released his debut album, Don't Let Go.

On August 14, 2009, he performed at the Grand Ole Opry.

On October 19, 2010, McBride released his first live CD/DVD, Live at Billy Bob's Texas, which includes the single "Tonight Ain't the Day".

In October 2012, McBride released his second studio album, Everybody Loves a Cowboy.

=== Discography ===
- Don't Let Go (2007)
  - Track Listing:
1. Don't Let Go
2. Tumbleweed Town
3. Beer Drinkin' Song
4. Bigger Fish to Fry
5. That Was Us
6. Went for a Ride
7. Cowboy 'Til I Die
8. It Takes a Lot
9. God's in Oklahoma Today
10. Good Saddles Ain't Cheap
11. Tough
12. Love Me If You Can

- Live at Billy Bob's Texas (live CD/DVD; October 19, 2010)
  - Track Listing:
1. Tonight Ain't the Day
2. That Was Us
3. Don't Let Go
4. Faster Horses
5. Upside of Being Down
6. Rodeo Man
7. Cadillac Cowboy
8. Went for a Ride
9. Don't Call Him a Cowboy
10. Waymore's Blues
11. Cowboy on the Radio
12. God's in Oklahoma
13. It Takes a Lot
14. Are You Sure Hank Done It This Way
15. Cadillac Cowboy (studio version)
16. Lived Past Dying (studio version)
17. God's in Oklahoma (studio version)
18. Tonight Ain't the Day (studio version)

- Everybody Loves a Cowboy (October 2012)
  - Track Listing:
1. Everybody Loves a Cowboy
2. A Fire That Just Won't Burn
3. It Makes Me Lean
4. Highways and Honky
5. Lovin' Me Look Easy
6. Bandy the Rodeo Clown
7. Never Gets Lonely Here
8. That's Why I'm Here
9. Too Late to Save the World
10. Hair of the Dog
11. It's Sure Been a Good Ride

== Coaching career ==
In 2022, McBride became the head coach of the Nashville Stampede; one of eight bull riding teams in the PBR Team Series, which debuted that year. It runs from the summer to autumn and concludes with the Team Series Championship at T-Mobile Arena in Las Vegas, Nevada. The Stampede finished in last place during the regular season. However, they outperformed the other teams at the inaugural Championship event and ended up winning the first PBR Team Series Championship title.

In 2023, the Stampede were eliminated after the first day of the Team Series Championship event.

In 2024, the PBR Team Series introduced the Ride-In Round. The event, which took place at the South Point Arena in Las Vegas, had the bottom four teams from the regular season compete against each other to determine the final two teams who competed at the Team Series Championship. The Nashville Stampede, along with the New York Mavericks moved on to the Championship event, defeating the Arizona Ridge Riders and Oklahoma Wildcatters. Both the Stampede and Mavericks were eliminated after the first round of the Championship event. In 2025, the PBR discontinued the Ride-In Round, meaning all 10 teams now compete at the Team Series Championship.

In January 2025, the Nashville Stampede defeated the Carolina Cowboys to win the PBR Monster Energy Team Challenge presented by Camping World at the Unleash the Beast Series (UTB) event in Chicago, Illinois. In March of the same year, the Stampede again defeated the Cowboys to win the Monster Energy Team Challenge at the UTB event in Louisville, Kentucky.

The Nashville Stampede were eliminated after the first day of the 2025 Team Series Championship event in October.

In January 2026, the Nashville Stampede defeated the New York Mavericks to win the Monster Energy Team Challenge at the UTB event in Sacramento, California. In February of the same year, the Stampede defeated the Texas Rattlers to win the Monster Energy Team Challenge at the UTB event in Jacksonville, Florida.

The Nashville Stampede finished third during the 2026 Team Series regular season. As a result, they received a first-round bye and automatically qualified for the second day of the Team Series Championship. They defeated the Carolina Cowboys and moved on to the third and final day of competition. On the third day, the Stampede defeated the Texas Rattlers. In the final game, they defeated the Arizona Ridge Riders to win their second Championship title, becoming the first PBR Team to do so.

== Honors ==
In 2009, McBride was inducted into the PBR Ring of Honor.

In 2016, he was inducted into the Texas Cowboy Hall of Fame.

In 2020, he was inducted into the Bull Riding Hall of Fame.

He won the inaugural Coach of the Year award for the PBR Team Series in 2022.

In 2023, he was ranked No. 1 on the list of the top 30 bull riders in PBR history.
