= Preston Wimberly =

American singer-songwriter (born 1984)

- Birth name: Preston Lark Wimberly
- Born: September 15, 1984 (age 40); Houston, Texas
- Genres: Country; Southern rock
- Occupations: Singer-Songwriter; Guitarist; Session Musician
- Instruments: Vocals; Guitar; Pedal Steel; Lap Steel; Dobro; Cello
- Years active: 2003−present
- Labels: Warner Bros.
- Formerly of: Noble Dog; The Statesboro Revue
- Website: prestonwimberly.com

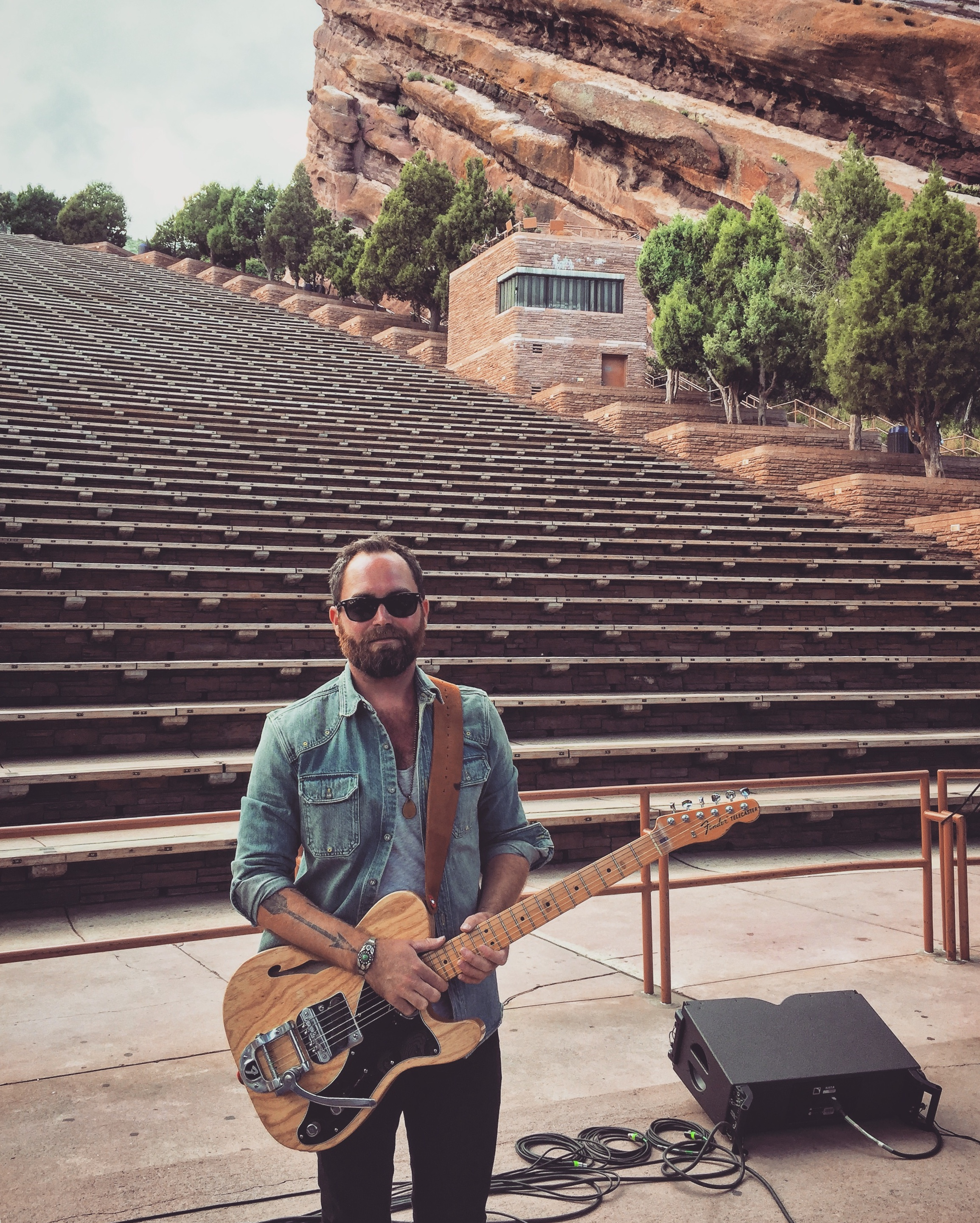
Wimberly at the Red Rocks Amphitheatre

Preston Wimberly is an American musician, singer, songwriter and guitarist known for being a former member of Jamestown Revival and a former member of The Wild Feathers.

== Career ==
Preston Wimberly was raised in Dallas. He and fellow Wild Feathers member Taylor Burns attended Richardson High School in Richardson, Texas. In 2007, Wimberly and Burns started blues band Noble Dog in Austin, Texas. Wimberly and Burns later went on to found country rock band The Wild Feathers in Nashville, Tennessee. The Wild Feathers were distinguished by their unique quadruple harmonic style, with four main vocalists. Like Wimberly, the other three vocalists in The Wild Feathers had previously been frontmen of their own bands before starting The Wild Feathers.

Wimberly recorded The Wild Feathers' self-titled 2013 album The Wild Feathers. He appeared in George Tillman Jr.'s 2015 film The Longest Ride. He officially left the band in 2015, after recording the album Lonely Is A Lifetime which was released in 2016. Wimberly has had a solo career as a guitarist, and performed with acts like James Bay (singer), Delta Rae and King Corduroy. He was featured on Statesboro Revue's album Ramble On Privilege Creek (2013).

In 2016, Wimberly joined Jamestown Revival as guitarist. Previously, Jamestown Revival had joined The Wild Feathers on their 2014 tour. In 2016 Wimberly performed at the Ryman Auditorium with The Wild Feathers' for their live album Live At The Ryman.

== Discography ==
=== Jamestown Revival ===
Year	Title	Artist	Credited as
2018	Live from Largo at the Coronet Theatre	Jamestown Revival	Electric guitar, pedal steel

=== The Wild Feathers ===
Year	Title	Artist	Credited as
2008	Girl From The Corner	Noble Dog	Composer, guitar, vocals
2009	Let's Go Home	Noble Dog	Composer, guitar, vocals
2013	Ramble on Privilege Creek	Statesboro Revue	Electric guitar
2013	The Wild Feathers	The Wild Feathers	Electric guitar, acoustic guitar, pedal steel, vocals
2016	Lonely Is A Lifetime	The Wild Feathers	Electric guitar, acoustic guitar, pedal steel, vocals

== Filmography ==
Year	Title	Directed by
2015	The Longest Ride	George Tillman Jr.
