= That Night (novel) =

1987 novel by Alice McDermott

- First edition
- Author: Alice McDermott
- Language: English
- Genre: Fiction
- Publisher: Farrar, Straus and Giroux
- Publication date: 1987
- Publication place: United States
- Media type: Print (hardback & paperback)
- Pages: 192
- ISBN: 978-0-374-27361-3

That Night (1987) is the second novel by American author Alice McDermott, published in 1987 by Farrar, Straus and Giroux. The novel was a Finalist for both the Pulitzer Prize in 1988 and the National Book Award in 1987.

Set in the 1960s, the novel's narrated through the lens of a 10-year-old girl fascinated with the romantic lives of two Long Island teenagers, Sheryl and Rick. In 1992, the novel was adapted into a film of the same name by director Craig Bolotin, starring C. Thomas Howell and Juliette Lewis.
