= Adriano Moraes =

Adriano Moraes may refer to:

- Adriano Morães (born 1970), Brazilian rodeo cowboy
- Adriano Moraes (fighter) (born 1988), Brazilian mixed martial artist
