= That Night (1992 film) =

1992 American film by Craig Bolotin

- Theatrical release poster
- Directed by: Craig Bolotin
- Screenplay by: Craig Bolotin
- Based on: That Night by Alice McDermott
- Produced by: Arnon Milchan; Steven Reuther
- Starring: C. Thomas Howell; Juliette Lewis; Eliza Dushku; Helen Shaver
- Cinematography: Bruce Surtees
- Edited by: Priscilla Nedd-Friendly
- Music by: David Newman
- Production companies: Le Studio Canal+ Regency Enterprises; Alcor Films
- Distributed by: Warner Bros.
- Release dates: December 17, 1992 (Australia); August 6, 1993 (United States)
- Running time: 89 minutes
- Country: United States
- Language: English
- Budget: < $15 million
- Box office: $20,194

That Night (originally titled One Hot Summer) is a 1992 American coming-of-age romantic drama film written and directed by Craig Bolotin and starring C. Thomas Howell and Juliette Lewis. It is based on the 1987 novel of the same name by Alice McDermott.

This film marks the film debut of both Eliza Dushku and Katherine Heigl.

== Plot ==
In 1961 Long Island, 10-year-old Alice Bloom is infatuated with 17-year-old Sheryl O'Connor, who lives across the street. She often watches her from her bedroom window.

Alice starts to copy every detail about Sheryl, including her perfume and even the record she listens to. She admires the affection Sheryl's father gives her, as hers does not show her any.

One day, when Alice goes bowling with friends, they ridicule her. Reeling from their comments, she becomes excited when Sheryl walks into the alley with a group of guys trying to win her affection. Seemingly innocent and moral, she rejects their advances. Sheryl meets the counter boy Rick, and they become attracted to each other.

While bowling with her friends, Alice watches Sheryl's every move. Her friends doubt that she even knows her. Rick pages Sheryl to come back to the desk, and a police officer tells her that her father died.

During the funeral, Sheryl is upset. That evening, returning her bowling shoes to the alley, she starts crying over her father. As they talk, Rick walks Sheryl home, and they have their first kiss, which Alice witnesses. The next day Rick comes back with his gang, and they take Sheryl to the beach, where they have oysters and tequila and she pours her heart out over her father's death. They spend the whole day and night together.

However, Sheryl's mother disapproves of their relationship. Eventually, she bars her from seeing Rick, and the neighborhood begins to gossip. Sheryl refuses to listen to her mother.

Babysitting Alice, a friendship begins with Sheryl imparting wisdom about boys. Alice offers to help her sneak out to see Rick. The three of them spend much of the night together which includes bringing Alice to seedy places like dive bars and under the boardwalk. She also makes a record in a booth detailing everything that happens that night.

Alice continues to help Sheryl and Rick hide their relationship. Later, she goes to the bowling alley to explain to Rick why Sheryl could not see him one day. Alice's father tells her to stay away from the older Rick. As Sheryl is pregnant, her mother sends her to an unwed mother's home 300 miles away. Rick repeatedly calls Sheryl's house only to have her mother tell him to stop calling.

Finally, Rick and his gang drive to Sheryl's house where he pleads to speak to her. This captures the attention of most of the immediate neighbors. Her mother tells him that Sheryl is gone and that he is to leave. Refusing to believe her, he pushes her aside to enter the house. The neighborhood fathers then rush to help Ann, and a brawl ensues between Rick's gang and the neighbors. Rick spends a week in jail.

Alice becomes withdrawn and decides to run away. Rick finds her under the boardwalk and they talk. Reluctantly, Rick agrees to drive upstate with Alice to find Sheryl at the unwed mother's home. Alice gets Sheryl to sneak out at midnight to meet Rick.

The couple meet but Sheryl has decided that she will put the baby up for adoption, as she cannot see a life with Rick and a baby since they have no money or viable jobs. Upset, Rick hands her an engagement ring that he suggests she pawn.

Alice then talks to Sheryl and asks her what happened to true love. Sheryl says that Alice is too young to understand. Alice still wants the three of them to run away together, but Sheryl insists that she cannot leave her family. As her bus departs for Long Island, she watches Rick and Sheryl embrace.

Alice arrives home, and her parents are relieved to have her back. She states that despite the gossip about Sheryl, she received a postcard telling her the truth: Sheryl and Rick were well on their way to the west coast and are doing well.

== Cast ==
- C. Thomas Howell as Rick
- Juliette Lewis as Sheryl O'Connor
- Helen Shaver as Ann O'Connor
- Eliza Dushku as Alice Bloom
- John Dossett as Larry Bloom
- J. Smith-Cameron as Carol Bloom
- Katherine Heigl as Kathryn
- Adam LeFevre as Mr. Carpenter

== Production ==
Filming began in Baltimore County in September 1991. It was also shot in Pennsylvania and New Jersey.

== Reception ==
The film holds a rating of 67% on Rotten Tomatoes based on 6 reviews. Among critical reviews, the performances by Dushku and Lewis were praised.

David Stratton of Variety wrote "This isn't exactly riveting material, and the film's modest production values seem more suited to the small screen. Nevertheless, [Dushku] makes the hero-worshiping moppet an engaging character, and Howell is just right as every suburban mom's idea of a daughter's undesirable boyfriend. Lewis, her hair dyed blond, is more than adequate as the vivacious Sheryl."

Janet Maslin of The New York Times expressed disappointment in the number and depth of changes made in the film, and found Lewis' "slinky, demonstrative performance is way out of proportion to the tepid film built around it." Entertainment Weekly graded the film "B−", remarking that director Bolotin "leans too heavily on period detail, but That Night clicks whenever it taps into the crazy, stupid madness of teen lust." Peter Travers of Rolling Stone wrote that while book author McDermott made clear how the intensity of the teen romance changes Alice's life, first-time director Bolotin offers a "pale facsimile that traffics in too many coming-of-age clichés", but concluded, "what makes That Night worth seeing is a knockout performance from Lewis, who evokes the joy and confusion of sexuality. You can't take your eyes off her."

== Home media ==
That Night was originally available on VHS via Warner Home Video in the United States on January 31, 1995, and the United Kingdom, where it was released on February 6, 1995.

The film was released on DVD in the U.S. (Region 1) on March 6, 2016, from 20th Century Fox Home Entertainment. The remastered set is available in its original aspect ratio of 1.85:1 and includes a digital copy.
