= The Wild Feathers =

American country rock band

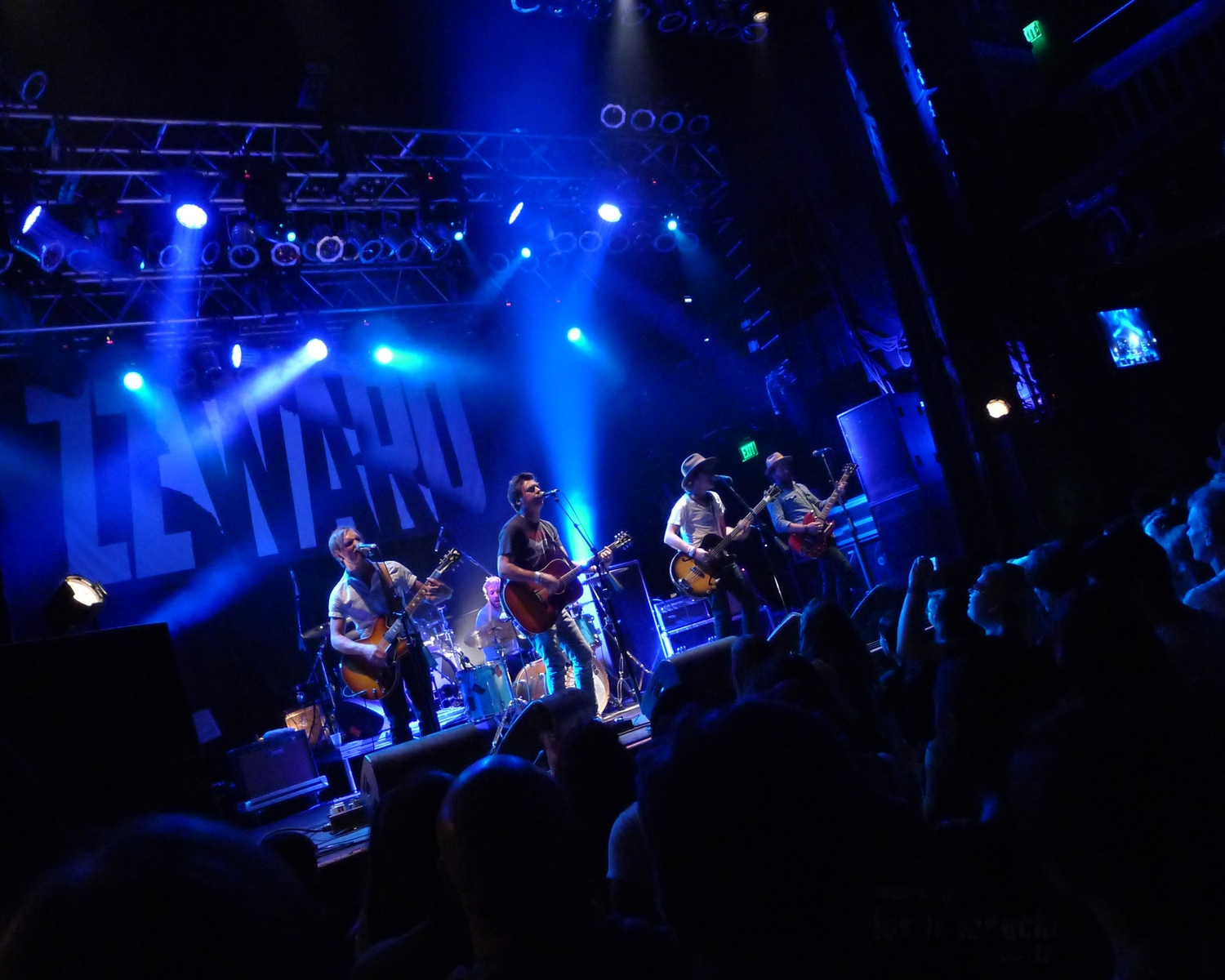

Background information
- Origin: Nashville, Tennessee, United States
- Genres: Country, Southern rock, rock, heartland rock, alternative rock
- Years active: 2010–present
- Label: Independent
- Members: Joel King; Ricky Young; Taylor Burns; Ben Dumas; Brett Moore
- Past members: Preston Wimberly (guitar) and Aaron Spraggs (drums) Daniel Donato (guitar)
- Website: http://thewildfeathers.com

The Wild Feathers are an American country rock band formed in 2010 in Nashville, Tennessee, United States, by Ricky Young, Joel King, and Taylor Burns, all of whom were lead singers in previous bands. Drummer Ben Dumas joined the band following the release of their debut album in the Summer of 2013. Multi-instrumentalist Brett Moore (formerly a member of Apache Relay, a band that had opened for The Wild Feathers) began touring with the band in 2015 and recording with the band for 2018's "Greetings From The Neon Frontier" album. The band's second studio album, Lonely Is a Lifetime, was released March 11, 2016. Their third studio album titled "Greetings from the Neon Frontier" was released June 29, 2018.

== History ==
The Wild Feathers was formed in 2010 by artists Joel King, Ricky Young, Taylor Burns, and Preston Wimberly. Burns and Wimberly were high school friends, and had previously played together in a band called Noble Dog. The band's four original members all contributed both vocals and guitar to the band. The band was signed by Jeff Sosnow, an A&R man at Interscope Records before playing a single live session or recording any songs. They were dropped by Interscope Records before finishing their first album and signed to Warner Records, where Sosnow had begun working.

The Wild Feathers began touring in 2013, playing hundreds of show with acts like Bob Dylan, Willie Nelson, and ZZ Ward, and playing at venues like Hangout Music Festival. Their self titled album, produced by Jay Joyce, was released in the summer of 2013 and charted at #1 on the Billboard Heatseeker's Chart and at #109 on the Billboard 200, resulting in invites to appear on various television programs, as well as acclaim from major music publications. Their single "The Ceiling" peaked at #7 on Adult Alternative Songs in October 2013. Guitarist and vocalist Preston Wimberly left the band in late 2015.

While on tour, the band began working on their second album, Lonely Is A Lifetime, which was released on March 11, 2016. On June 25, 2016 The Wild Feathers recorded Live At The Ryman, played to a soldout Ryman Auditorium. Live At The Ryman celebrated the band's return to Nashville and the release of Lonely Is A Lifetime. Former-member Preston Wimberly made a guest appearance on the track "Left My Woman", from Live At The Ryman.

On June 29, 2018 The Wild Feathers released their third album Greetings from the Neon Frontier, which was produced with Jay Joyce

On November 20, 2020, the band independently released Medium Rarities, an album featuring 11 previously unreleased songs from the band's 10-year career. The album includes covers of “Blue” by The Jayhawks, “Almost Cut My Hair,” by Crosby, Stills, Nash & Young, and “The Guitar Man” by Bread.

== Style and influences ==
The Wild Feathers features the harmonic talents of multiple vocalists, including King, Young, and Burns. The Wild Feathers have been noted for their blend of Southern rock and Americana, blues, and folk music. Ricky Young acknowledged the influence of The Band on the group's sound, but pointed out that there were many other inspirations behind The Wild Feather's sound. The Wild Feathers have cited acts like Tom Petty, The Eagles, and Otis Redding as inspirations.

== Discography ==
=== Studio albums ===
Year	Album details	Peak chart positions				
Year	Album details	US 200	US Heat	US Alt	US Rock	UK
2013	The Wild Feathers: Label: Warner Bros. Records; Format: CD, vinyl	109	1	17	25	—
2016	Lonely Is a Lifetime: Label: Warner Bros. Records; Format: CD, vinyl	—	4	24	31	—
2018	Greetings from the Neon Frontier: Label: Reprise Records; Format: CD, vinyl	—	—	—		
2020	Medium Rarities: Format:vinyl	—	—	—	—	
2021	Alvarado: Label: New West Records; Format: CD, vinyl	—	—	—		
2024	Sirens: Label: New West Records; Format: CD, vinyl					

=== Live albums ===
Year	Album details	Peak chart positions				
Year	Album details	US 200	US Heat	US Alt	US Rock	UK
2016	Live At The Ryman: Label: Warner Bros. Records; Format: CD, vinyl	—	—	—	—	—
