= Light It Up (film) =

1999 film directed by Craig Bolotin

- Theatrical release poster
- Directed by: Craig Bolotin
- Written by: Craig Bolotin
- Produced by: Tracy Edmonds
- Starring: Usher Raymond; Forest Whitaker; Rosario Dawson; Judd Nelson; Vanessa L. Williams
- Cinematography: Elliot Davis
- Edited by: Wendy Greene Bricmont
- Music by: Harry Gregson-Williams
- Production company: Edmonds Entertainment
- Distributed by: 20th Century Fox
- Release date: November 10, 1999
- Running time: 99 minutes
- Country: United States
- Language: English
- Budget: $13 million
- Box office: $5,985,690

Light It Up is a 1999 film starring an ensemble cast that consists of R&B singer/actor Usher Raymond (in his first leading role), Forest Whitaker, Rosario Dawson, and Vanessa L. Williams. The film was written and directed by Craig Bolotin, and produced by Kenneth "Babyface" Edmonds and his wife Tracy Edmonds.

The film follows five teenage high school seniors and one sophomore, who hold a wounded police officer hostage and barricade themselves inside the school.

== Plot summary ==
In an urban Queens high school students, Lester DeWitt, who lost his father, his younger best friend, artist Zacharias 'Ziggy' Malone, hard-working Stephanie Williams, criminal Rodney J. Templeton, rebellious pregnant Lynn Sabatini, and hustler Robert Tremont a.k.a. "Rivers", attend the history class of the caring Ken Knowles. The room is freezing so Mr. Knowles takes them to the principal's office, where Principal Allen Armstrong tells Knowles to take them "anywhere".

Since there is no space anywhere in the school, Knowles and the kids go to a local diner, where a robbery takes place. Knowles confronts the robber, who was a former student who dropped out of school. Principal Armstrong is infuriated by what Knowles has done and puts him on administrative leave. Lester, Stephanie, and Ziggy are at the main office as Knowles leaves the school.

Stephanie is disgusted that Principal Armstrong has ignored that he told Knowles to "take the class anywhere" and confronts him about this. In response, Principal Armstrong suspends Rivers, Ziggy, Stephanie, and Lester from the school and calls in Officer Jackson to remove all of them. Ziggy tries to leave, afraid to go home, but Officer Jackson restrains him.

Lester tries to resist Officer Jackson and loses, but Ziggy picks up Officer Jackson's dropped Glock 19 pistol and says "I [Ziggy] cannot go home." The reason for this is that Ziggy has been physically abused by his father for many years. Officer Jackson tries to restrain Ziggy but is accidentally shot in the leg as he grabs for his gun. Principal Armstrong tells school security to call an ambulance and the N.Y.P.D. in order to arrest Ziggy. Lester then grabs the gun and orders everyone to evacuate the school. This finally forces the N.Y.P.D. detectives to come in, led by Detective Audrey McDonald as a negotiator.

In the middle of all of this, there is a subplot in which Lynn berates Stephanie for being a "goody-two-shoes", and a fight in the school's library that includes Rivers and Rodney, as well as Officer Jackson fleeing from Rodney and the others after knocking him out to use the bathroom. Another notable subplot was Ziggy showing everyone his artistic talents, such being a mural of himself and others on a classroom wall.

Still waiting after a couple of hours, the group continues to hold Officer Dante Jackson against his will. Lester tells everybody, including Stephanie and Dante about how his father (Robert Lee Minor) was gunned down during a wrongful arrest. In the next few scenes, Rivers, Lynn, Rodney, Ziggy, Stephanie, and Lester, a.k.a. "The Lincoln 6", are all becoming infamous across New York City, as they are exposed and identified on such networks such as BET, VH1, NBC, NY1 and CBS, as well as MTV, as well being announced on radio.

Debate continues as the events take place, until Detective McDonald and her colleague (Vic Polizos) debate on getting the kids something, which after several hours of stalling, the electricity being shut down at the school and the SWAT team storming in on the others as Lester takes Officer Jackson on top of the roof. There, Lester tells Officer Jackson that he resents all policemen for what has happened to his father, and Jackson tries to reassure him. Lester surrenders and Jackson consoles him. The comforting moment is short-lived when Rodney grabs Officer Jackson from behind to finish the job and Lester tries to talk him out of it. In the midst of all this, Captain Monroe orders a sniper on a helicopter to take out Lester. Things go horribly wrong when Ziggy rushes onto the roof and is shot down by a sniper aimed at Lester. Lester runs to Ziggy's aid and comforts him while waiting for help. A dying Ziggy tells Lester he finally stands up and makes Lester promise to tell everyone why they did what they did. Lester promises and Ziggy dies in his arms. The next day the remaining 5 students are arrested and taken into custody.

As the film reaches its climax, the narrator (Ziggy) talks about what happened to the kids and the officer: Officer Jackson testified in court that the events did not happen as the media have portrayed them, thus giving the kids a lesser sentence. Lester spent two years in state prison and has gone off to a city college to study law. Stephanie spent one year in prison and went to study at St. John's University. Lynn was sentenced to one year in prison but was released earlier due to having her baby boy (named after Ziggy) and is never heard from again.

Rodney spends an unknown amount of time in prison and becomes a Muslim, Rivers is forced to join the military, due to the judge having him spend years in prison due to his priors or join the army. Mr. Knowles has been rehired back to the school and still teaches history. Lester kept his promise to Ziggy and comes back to Lincoln every year to tell other students their story and how what they did and Ziggy's death changed Lincoln forever. The end also shows Lester and Stephanie looking at a painting that was crafted by Ziggy, who is forever remembered as the next Jean-Michel Basquiat a.k.a. "The Radiant Child".

== Cast ==
- Usher Raymond as Lester Dewitt
- Forest Whitaker as Officer Dante Jackson (In the movie, he wears the three blue stripes which identify a Sgt but is called officer)
- Rosario Dawson as Stephanie Williams
- Robert Ri'chard as Zacharias 'Ziggy' Malone / The Narrator
- Judd Nelson as Ken Knowles
- Fredro Starr as Rodney J. Templeton
- Sara Gilbert as Lynn Sabatini
- Clifton Collins Jr. as Robert 'Rivers' Tremont
- Glynn Turman as Principal Allan Armstrong
- Vic Polizos as Captain Monroe
- Vanessa L. Williams as Detective Audrey McDonald
- Robert Lee Minor as Lester's Father (flashback)
- Artel Great as Shakur (uncredited)

== Production ==
The film was mostly shot at Calumet Career Prep High School in Chicago, Illinois, although set in New York City.

== Soundtrack ==
A soundtrack containing hip-hop and R&B music was released on November 9, 1999, by Yab Yum/Elektra Records. It peaked at #19 on the Billboard 200 and #4 on the Top R&B/Hip-Hop Albums.

== Reception ==
=== Box office ===
Light It Up was released on November 10, 1999. The film grossed a worldwide total of $5,985,690 against a production budget of $13 million.

=== Critical response ===
On the review aggregator website Rotten Tomatoes, 40% of 48 critics' reviews are positive, with an average rating of 5/10. The website's consensus reads: "Soon after the student uprising, the story starts to feel like a warmed over after-school special." On Metacritic, it has an average score of 43 out of 100 based on 27 reviews, indicating "mixed or average" reviews.

Roger Ebert, said about Light it up, "The problem is the movie is too predictable--so predictable that it keeps it from truly generating suspense."

== See also ==
- List of hood films
