= PBR World Championship =

- Sport: Bull riding
- League: Bud Light Cup Series (1994–2002); Built Ford Tough Series (2003–2017); Unleash the Beast Series (2018–present)
- Awarded for: Best overall bull rider in the PBR premier series
- Venue: Dickies Arena; Fort Worth, Texas, U.S.
- Country: United States
- Presented by: Professional Bull Riders

History
- First award: 1994
- Editions: 33
- First winner: (Brazil) Adriano Morães
- Most wins: (Brazil) Adriano Morães (Brazil) Silvano Alves (Brazil) José Vitor Leme
- Most recent: (United States) John Crimber

The PBR World Championship is the premier individual championship awarded by Professional Bull Riders (PBR) to the rider who accumulates the most PBR World Championship points during a season. First awarded in 1994, the championship is contested throughout the PBR season and culminates at the PBR World Finals, where the champion is crowned and receives the PBR World Championship buckle.

The championship has been awarded annually since 1994 and has been contested under several names for the PBR's premier series, including the Bud Light Cup Series from 1994 to 2002, the Built Ford Tough Series from 2003 to 2017, and the Unleash the Beast Series since 2018. Adriano Morães was the inaugural champion, while John Crimber is the reigning champion, having won the 2026 championship.

Three riders – Adriano Morães, Silvano Alves, and José Vitor Leme – have won the championship three times, the most in PBR history.

== List of champions ==
Season	Champion	Hometown	Points	Ref.
1994	(Brazil) Adriano Morães	Cachoeira Paulista, São Paulo		
1995	(United States) Tuff Hedeman	Morgan Mill, Texas		
1996	(United States) Owen Washburn	Lordsburg, New Mexico	6,310.00	
1997	(United States) Michael Gaffney	Albuquerque, New Mexico		
1998	(Australia) Troy Dunn	Sarina, Queensland	7,994.00	
1999	(United States) Cody Hart	Gainesville, Texas	10,100.00	
2000	(United States) Chris Shivers	Jonesville, Louisiana	9,138.50	
2001	(Brazil) Adriano Morães (2)	Cachoeira Paulista, São Paulo	11,119.00	
2002	(Brazil) Ednei Caminhas	Presidente Alves, São Paulo	9,413.00	
2003	(United States) Chris Shivers (2)	Jonesville, Louisiana	8,455.50	
2004	(United States) Mike Lee	Paradise, Texas	12,138.25	
2005	(United States) Justin McBride	Elk City, Oklahoma	13,415.25	
2006	(Brazil) Adriano Morães (3)	Cachoeira Paulista, São Paulo	11,109.75	
2007	(United States) Justin McBride (2)	Elk City, Oklahoma	14,820.25	
2008	(Brazil) Guilherme Marchi	Leme, São Paulo	16,841.50	
2009	(United States) Kody Lostroh	Longmont, Colorado	16,640.00	
2010	(Brazil) Renato Nunes	Buritama, São Paulo	13,960.00	
2011	(Brazil) Silvano Alves	Pilar do Sul, São Paulo	15,742.00	
2012	(Brazil) Silvano Alves (2)	Pilar do Sul, São Paulo	12,201.75	
2013	(United States) J.B. Mauney	Mooresville, North Carolina	15,092.25	
2014	(Brazil) Silvano Alves (3)	Pilar do Sul, São Paulo	11,703.50	
2015	(United States) J.B. Mauney (2)	Mooresville, North Carolina	5,905.00	
2016	(United States) Cooper Davis	Jasper, Texas	5,815.00	
2017	(United States) Jess Lockwood	Volborg, Montana	4,262.50	
2018	(Brazil) Kaique Pacheco	Itatiba, São Paulo	5,199.16	
2019	(United States) Jess Lockwood (2)	Volborg, Montana	7,562.50	
2020	(Brazil) José Vitor Leme	Ribas do Rio Pardo, Mato Grosso do Sul	1,474.00	
2021	(Brazil) José Vitor Leme (2)	Ribas do Rio Pardo, Mato Grosso do Sul	2,832.50	
2022	(United States) Daylon Swearingen	Piffard, New York	1,567.50	
2023	(Brazil) Rafael José de Brito	Potirendaba, São Paulo	1,338.00	
2024	(Brazil) Cássio Dias	São Francisco de Sales, Minas Gerais	1,830.33	
2025	(Brazil) José Vitor Leme (3)	Ribas do Rio Pardo, Mato Grosso do Sul	1,494.00	
2026	(United States) John Crimber	Decatur, Texas	1,242.50	

=== Champions by country ===
No.	Country	Seasons
17	United States	1995, 1996, 1997, 1999, 2000, 2003, 2004, 2005, 2007, 2009, 2013, 2015, 2016, 2017, 2019, 2022, 2026
15	Brazil	1994, 2001, 2002, 2006, 2008, 2010, 2011, 2012, 2014, 2018, 2020, 2021, 2023, 2024, 2025
1	Australia	1998
0	Canada	
0	Mexico	
0	New Zealand	
0	Costa Rica	
0	Guatemala	
