= Mike Lee (bull rider) =

American bull rider (born 1983)

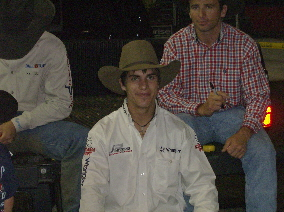
- Lee in Edmonton, Alberta, in 2008

Personal information
- Full name: Michael Riley Lee
- Nickname: Mike
- Born: June 11, 1983 (age 43) Billings, Montana, U.S.
- Height: 5 ft 9 in (1.75 m) (2019)
- Weight: 160 lb (73 kg) (2019)

Sport
- Sport: Rodeo
- Event: Bull riding
- Turned pro: 2001
- Retired: 2025

Achievements and titles
- Highest world ranking: 2004 PBR World Champion; 2004 PBR World Finals Event Champion

Michael Riley Lee (born June 11, 1983) is an American former professional rodeo cowboy who specialized in bull riding. He was the 2004 PBR World Champion.

In 2023, Lee was ranked No. 28 on the list of the top 30 bull riders in PBR history.

== Career ==
Lee rode bulls while growing up, and he joined the PBR's Touring Pro Division in 2001 (then known as the Challenger Tour) when he was 18 years old. He also competed in the Professional Rodeo Cowboys Association (PRCA) and filled his permit within months. Lee first broke onto the PBR's Premier Series (then known as the Bud Light Cup Series) in 2002. He became the first rider to win both the PBR World Finals event title and World Championship simultaneously, which he accomplished in 2004. He was also the first rider to win the PBR World Championship without a regular-season event win. He qualified for the PBR World Finals every single year from 2002 through 2017.

Lee was an early adapter among bull riders who favored a helmet to the familiar cowboy hat, which he attributes to avoidance and exacerbation of career and life-threatening injuries. He credited the helmet for having saved his life after incurring a severe head injury and skull fracture at a PRCA rodeo in Fort Smith, Arkansas, in 2003, which required brain surgery. Lee was the first world champion bull rider to compete his entire professional career with a helmet.

In 2006, during the last Built Ford Tough Series (BFTS) regular season event of the year in Columbus, Ohio, Lee won the first round of the event and became eligible for the Mossy Oak Shootout. He successfully rode his bull and won the $15,000 bounty. It was significant because not only was it the last successful ride to win the challenge, but also the very last Mossy Oak Shootout outing ever, as the challenge was discontinued after 2006. The year 2007 was a difficult one professionally for Lee due to severe head injuries. In 2010, he won the PBR Canada Finals event in Saskatoon, Saskatchewan.

On Saturday night, April 16, 2016, at the Stanley Performance In Action Invitational, in Billings, Montana (Lee's place of birth), he joined Guilherme Marchi as the second bull rider in PBR history to complete 500 qualified rides. He rode Tahonta's Magic for 86.75 points during Round 2. At that time, Lee was 500-for-1,068 (46.82 percent) in his PBR Premier Series career. He has 14 event wins, 23 90-points rides, and one world championship. He has obtained 50 or more qualified rides in a season three times. One time was a career best of 54 qualified rides in 2008. About all of his success at the time of his 500 ride accomplishment, Lee had this to say, "It is all thanks to God that I am still here," Lee concluded. "Just to stay healthy and be blessed this much is something to be happy for and have joy for."

Lee qualified for the PBR World Finals a record sixteen consecutive times from 2002 through 2017. In November 2017, he announced via Facebook that he was going to focus his bull riding career in other associations. In 2018, he rode in the Professional Rodeo Cowboys Association (PRCA), Championship Bull Riding (CBR), and Tuff Hedeman Bull Riding (THBR) tours.

In the summer of 2022, after five years of mainly riding in regional semi-professional bull riding circuits, Lee announced on his Instagram page his return to the PBR. He rode sporadically in the PBR in 2022 and 2023, before returning to the semi-pro circuit in 2024.

Lee retired from bull riding in 2025; his career having lasted 25 years.

== Faith on the road ==
Lee credits his successes to his Christian faith. Taking a knee after each ride, no matter the outcome, Lee thanked God on the arena for safety and protection.

Lee was an instructor at the former Christian Bull Riding and Bull Fighting School which was held at the Frost Ranch in Lane, Oklahoma. It was an annual event in honor of Lane Frost, an iconic bull rider who died of injuries from a bucking bull in Cheyenne, Wyoming. On October 8, 2017, the school announced it was closing. It ran every June from 2005 through 2016.

== Personal life ==
Lee was born in Billings, Montana, on June 11, 1983. When he was four years old, the family moved to Paradise, Texas. Later on, they moved to Decatur, Texas, where he still lives.

Lee and his son Noah competed together in the semi-professional circuit during the last few years of Mike's career. Noah started his professional career in 2026, the year he turned 18, and now rides in the PRCA.

== Honors ==
In 2026, Mike Lee was inducted into the Bull Riding Hall of Fame.
