= Craig Bolotin =

American screenwriter and film director

- Born: Chicago, Illinois, U.S.
- Occupations: Film director, producer, screenwriter
- Years active: 1984-present

Craig Martin Bolotin is an American screenwriter and film director. He graduated from the University of California at Berkeley where he studied philosophy and penned film reviews. He has written and rewritten numerous screenplays (several uncredited) for such directors as Ridley Scott and Francis Ford Coppola.

After moving to Los Angeles, Bolotin wrote and directed the short film Sapphire Man starring Powers Boothe, which was selected to play at the Sundance Film Festival, and won the Special Gold Jury Award at the Houston International Film Festival. His screenwriting break came with his first uncredited rewrite for the critically acclaimed Desperately Seeking Susan, starring Rosanna Arquette and Madonna. The film was named one of the 10 best films of the year by The New York Times. Shortly thereafter, Bolotin sold his first original screenplay, a comedy No Small Affair starring Jon Cryer. His next produced credit was Black Rain starring Michael Douglas and directed by Ridley Scott, which grossed over 140 million dollars. Bolotin then wrote the original screenplay Straight Talk, produced by Disney. He directed his first feature film for producer Arnon Milchan and Warner Brothers, That Night, starring Juliette Lewis. This was also the first feature film for actresses Eliza Dushku and Katherine Heigl. He then wrote and directed the original screenplay Light It Up with Forest Whitaker and Rosario Dawson, a story that shines a light on the plight of inner city school children.

Bolotin wrote the script for The Longest Ride (2015), based on the novel of the same name for Fox 2000. He also adapted Hilary Mantel's novel Eight Months on Ghazzah Street, with Michael Apted attached to direct.
