= The Longest Ride (film) =

2015 film by George Tillman, Jr

- Theatrical release poster
- Directed by: George Tillman Jr.
- Written by: Craig Bolotin
- Based on: The Longest Ride by Nicholas Sparks
- Produced by: Marty Bowen; Wyck Godfrey; Nicholas Sparks; Theresa Park
- Starring: Britt Robertson; Scott Eastwood; Jack Huston; Oona Chaplin; Alan Alda
- Cinematography: David Tattersall
- Edited by: Jason Ballantine
- Music by: Mark Isham
- Production companies: Fox 2000 Pictures; Temple Hill Entertainment
- Distributed by: 20th Century Fox
- Release date: April 10, 2015
- Running time: 128 minutes
- Country: United States
- Language: English
- Budget: $34 million
- Box office: $63 million

The Longest Ride is a 2015 American romantic drama film directed by George Tillman Jr. and written by Craig Bolotin. Based on Nicholas Sparks' 2013 novel, the film stars Britt Robertson, Scott Eastwood, Jack Huston, Oona Chaplin, and Alan Alda. The film was released on April 10, 2015, by 20th Century Fox.

== Plot ==
Professional bull rider Luke Collins meets Sophia Danko, an art student at Wake Forest University, after she attends a PBR event. On the way home from their first date, they spot a car crash in the woods and help rescue an elderly man from the vehicle, along with a box full of letters.

In the hospital, Sophia visits the 91-year-old man she rescued, Ira Levinson. He explains the letters are what he wrote as a teen to his late wife, Ruth, and she offers to read them to him, which tell the story of how they met and fell in love in 1940.

In flashbacks, Ruth tells a young Ira that she wants a big family, and he eventually proposes to her before leaving to fight in World War II. However, Ira is shot during an attack and is later informed that he can no longer have children, news that causes distance between Ruth and Ira when he returns. Regardless, they decide to make it work and move in together, decorating the house with many paintings that Ruth and he love.

Back in the present day, Ira is moved to a nursing home where Sophia continues to visit. Luke continues bull riding as Sophia and he fall in love. He attends an art exhibit with her, which he finds uninteresting, and they realize how different their two worlds are; Luke says he does not feel their relationship will work.

Sophia goes to Ira for advice, who tells her how he and Ruth made it work. In flashbacks, it is revealed that Ruth, a school teacher, became attached to a young student named Daniel McDonald after finding out she and Ira wouldn't have children of their own. They wanted to adopt him but Daniel's uncaring relatives wouldn't allow it.

Luke is injured while riding and is rushed to hospital. He is advised not to ride again but he refuses to accept that his career is over. Following an argument, Luke and Sophia break up. In flashbacks, Ira and Ruth break up because she cannot see a life without children in their future. However, weeks later, Ruth returns as she cannot live without Ira. Decades later, now 80 years old, Ira wakes up to find Ruth has died in her sleep.

One night, a woman knocks on his door, claiming to be the wife of Daniel McDonald, the child they wanted to adopt when they were younger, and informs Ira that Daniel, who later became a professor of physics and astronomy, has died. She gives him a portrait of Ruth that he had painted, with a message on the back that reads: "Ruth Levinson, third grade teacher. She told me I could be anything I wanted to be when I grew up".

Sophia and Luke are contacted by Ira's attorney who tells them that he has died and an auction will be held for his collection of paintings. Meanwhile, Luke wins his last ride, and the event championship, but feels disappointed because Sophia is not there to share it with him.

Going to the auction, Luke buys the first piece of art, a simple painting by Daniel "Portrait of Ruth", after it seems no one else wants it and the opening bid drops several times. He and Sophia reconcile with a kiss after he tells her he will not ride anymore because what he really wants is to be with her for the rest of his life. The auctioneer then reveals Ira's clause in the auction rules was: whoever buys Daniel's portrait will receive the entire collection, worth almost $200 million, as it is the piece of art that meant the most to him.

A year later, Luke and Sophia, now married, have built an art gallery dedicated to Ira and Ruth and their paintings. He takes her to Black Mountain College where Ira and Ruth used to spend their wedding anniversary. They sit under the same tree and read Ira's letters together.

== Cast ==
- Scott Eastwood as Luke Collins
- Britt Robertson as Sophia Danko
- Alan Alda as Ira Levinson
  - Jack Huston as young Ira
- Melissa Benoist as Marcia
- Naomi Eckhaus as Ruth
  - Oona Chaplin as young Ruth
- Lolita Davidovich as Linda Collins
- Gloria Reuben as Adrienne Francis
- Barry Ratcliffe as the Auctioneer
- Peter Jurasik as Howie Sanders
- Brett Edwards as Jared Middleton
- Hunter Burke as David Stein
- Alina Lia as Brooke
- Brian E. Cole as Luke's Father
- Rango the bull as Himself

== Production ==
=== Development ===
In April 2014, Fox 2000 Pictures set a film adaptation to be released on April 10, 2015, with George Tillman Jr. in final talks to direct, Craig Bolotin adapting the screenplay, and Britt Robertson as Sophia Danko, Oona Chaplin as Ruth, Scott Eastwood as Luke Collins, Jack Huston as Young Ira, and Alan Alda as old Ira.

=== Filming ===
Principal photography began on June 16, 2014, in Wilmington and Winston-Salem, North Carolina. On July 28, filming started in Jacksonville, where a major rodeo scene was shot. The PBR was the technical advisor and producer for all of the bull riding events. PBR bull riders doubled for Scott and appeared in the film. The crew then moved to Winston-Salem at the Lawrence Joel Veterans Memorial Coliseum.

== Reception ==
=== Box office ===
The Longest Ride grossed $37,446,117 in North America and $25,498,698 in other territories for a worldwide total of $62,944,815.

In its opening weekend, the film grossed $13,019,686, finishing third at the box office behind Furious 7 ($59,585,930) and Home ($18,532,280).

=== Critical reception ===
The Longest Ride has received negative reviews from critics. On review aggregator website Rotten Tomatoes, the film has a rating of 31%, based on 124 reviews, with an average rating of 4.4/10. The site's critical consensus reads, "The Longest Ride is less manipulative than the average Nicholas Sparks film, but it's still saccharine and hopelessly contrived — not that it'll matter to the target audience." On Metacritic, which assigns a normalized rating, the film has a score of 33 out of 100, based on 30 critics, indicating "generally unfavorable reviews".

The Longest Ride earned an average grade of "A" in CinemaScore poll on an A+ to F scale, marking the first Sparks feature adaptation to earn an A in 11 years since The Notebook (2004).

== Accolades ==
Year	Ceremony	Category	Recipient(s)	Result
2015	Teen Choice Awards	Choice Movie: Drama	The Longest Ride	Nominated
2015	Teen Choice Awards	Choice Movie Actor: Drama	Scott Eastwood	Won
2015	Teen Choice Awards	Choice Movie Actress: Drama	Britt Robertson	Nominated
2015	Teen Choice Awards	Choice Movie: Breakout Star	Scott Eastwood	Nominated
2016	People's Choice Awards	Favorite Dramatic Movie	The Longest Ride	Nominated

== Home media ==
The Longest Ride was released on DVD and Blu-ray on July 14, 2015.
