= Adriano Morães =

Brazilian bull rider

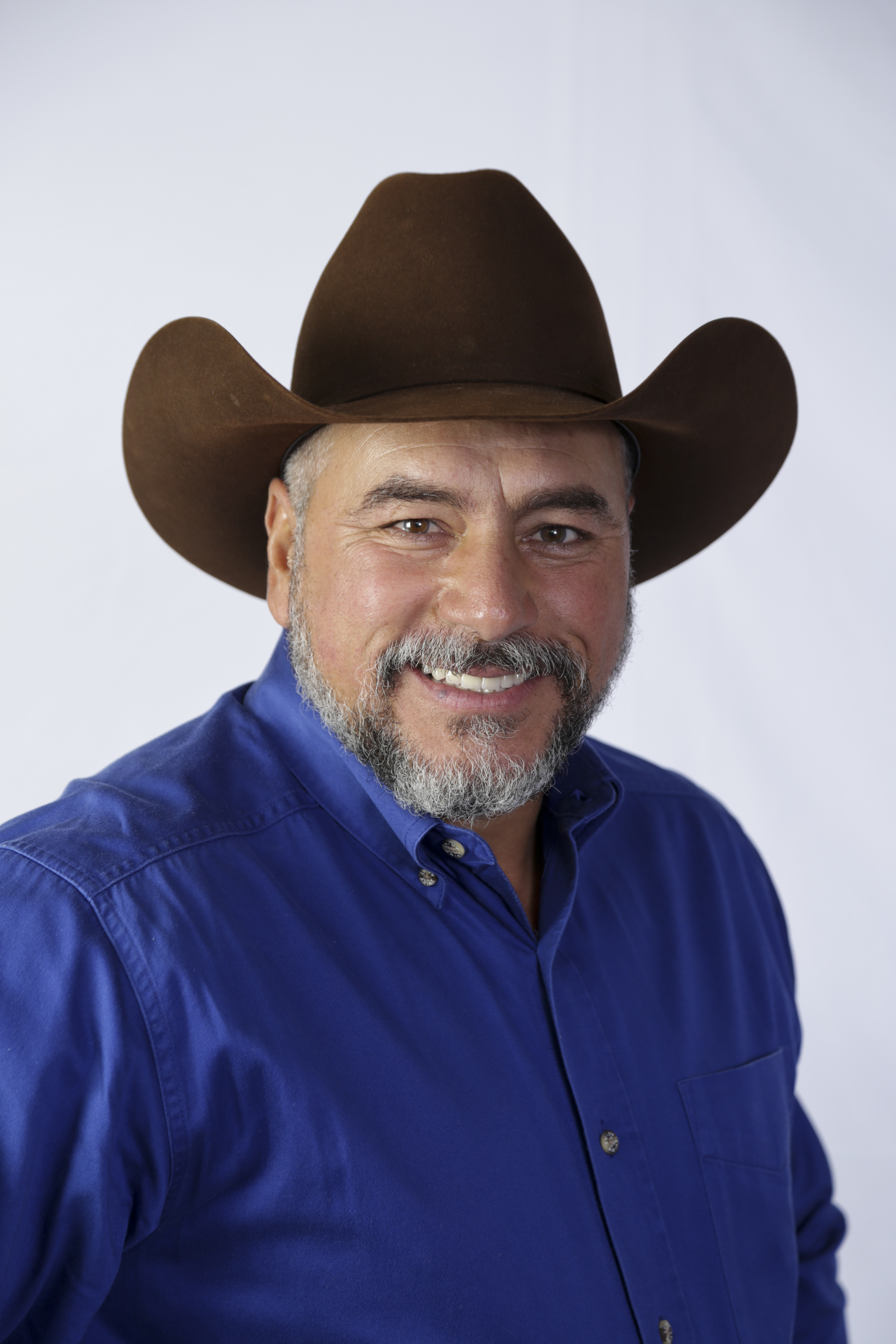

Personal information
- Born: Adriano Silva Morães; April 20, 1970 (age 56) Quintana, São Paulo, Brazil
- Height: 5 ft 10 in (1.78 m) (2023)
- Weight: 185 lb (84 kg) (2023)

Sport
- Sport: Rodeo
- Event: Bull riding
- Turned pro: 1988
- Retired: 2008

Achievements and titles
- World finals: 3× PBR World Champion; 2× NFR Bull Riding Average Champion

Adriano Silva Morães (born April 20, 1970) is a Brazilian former professional rodeo cowboy who specialized in bull riding. He was one of the leading bull riders in the world from the mid-1990s to 2000s, with two titles at the National Finals Rodeo (NFR) and three PBR World Championships to his credit.

In 2023, Morães was ranked No. 4 on the list of the top 30 bull riders in PBR history.

== Early life ==
Morães was born April 20, 1970, on his relatives' farm in Quintana, São Paulo, Brazil, but grew up on the ranch his father managed in Cachoeira Paulista. Morães says he is of Portuguese, Italian and African ancestry. "Most of us, we are a big mixture of races", Moraes says, "We have in us the best of every single breed".

He grew up wanting to follow in his father's footsteps, but started riding bulls when he was 15. At age 17, he rode in his first professional rodeo in Brazil, and placed second in his third rodeo. Shortly after this, he quit school to ride bulls full-time.

== Career ==
Morães began his career at small rodeos throughout Brazil, eventually becoming a regular winner on that circuit. After being encouraged by a former PRCA bull riding world champion, Charlie Sampson, he set a goal of riding full-time in the United States.

After winning Brazilian national titles in 1992 and 1993, Morães moved to the United States in 1994; riding on the Professional Rodeo Cowboys Association (PRCA), Bull Riders Only (BRO) and Professional Bull Riders (PBR) circuits. He immediately emerged as a major star, winning the average at both the Calgary Stampede and the NFR, as well as winning the PBR's inaugural world championship. Most notably, Morães became only the third man ever to ride 10 out of 10 bulls at the NFR. The other two being Jim Sharp in 1988 and Norman Curry in 1990.

Morães would again win the average at the NFR in 1996, and in 1997 was on track to win his second PBR world title until breaking a leg during that summer, forcing him to sit out the rest of the year while Michael Gaffney overtook him for the world title. Morães did become the first man to win a second PBR world title, which he won in 2001. His success on that circuit was instrumental in the expansion of the PBR tour to include events in Brazil. He went on to win a third PBR world title in 2006, narrowly beating fellow Brazilian, Guilherme Marchi, despite severe back problems during the PBR World Finals. Morães was the first bull rider to win three PBR world championships. In that year, he won an all-time series record of $1.36 million—more than three times as much as any other rider. At the end of the 2006 season, his all-time earnings on the PBR circuit were $3.37 million, also a record. Morães had been honored for his accomplishments with a life-size bronze statue of him on Little Yellow Jacket that stood at the entrance to the then-new PBR headquarters building in Pueblo, Colorado.

Morães announced in January 2008 that the 2008 Built Ford Tough Series season would be his final season of bull riding. He qualified for his last PBR World Finals in late October/early November 2008. His last ride saw him buck off of a bull named Grey Dog, as Morães failed to qualify for the championship round.

Morães qualified for the PBR World Finals a total of 14 times; 1994 to 1998 and 2000 to 2008, although he did not compete at the 1995 and 1997 World Finals due to season-ending injuries (a torn groin in 1995 and a broken leg in 1997). His younger brothers André and Allan were also professional bull riders. All three competed at the PBR World Finals in 2004 and 2005.

Fellow countrymen Silvano Alves and José Vitor Leme would eventually join Adriano Morães as the other two bull riders to win three PBR World Championships; Alves won his in 2011, 2012 and 2014, while Leme won his in 2020, 2021 and 2025.

== Post-career ==
After retiring from bull riding as a contestant, Morães and his family moved back to Brazil, where he started a bull riding school for future riders. He has also done color commentary for televised PBR Brazil events, as well as Portuguese commentary for televised and live-streamed U.S. PBR events.

In 2023, Morães became the Director of Brazil Operations for the Austin Gamblers; one of eight bull riding teams in the PBR Team Series, which debuted the previous year and runs from the summer to autumn in the United States. It concludes with the Team Series Championship at T-Mobile Arena in Las Vegas, Nevada. The Austin Gamblers won the first Team Series event of 2023 in Cheyenne, Wyoming, in late July. The Gamblers later won the Team Series event in Anaheim, California, in mid-August. This was the second year in a row that the Gamblers won the event in said city. Two weeks later, the Gamblers won their own hometown event at Gambler Days in Austin, Texas. In late September, the Gamblers won Cowboy Days in Greensboro, North Carolina; the hometown event of rival team, the Carolina Cowboys. In October, for the second year in a row, the Gamblers were the regular-season champions. As a result, both them and second-place team, the Kansas City Outlaws, received first-round byes and automatically qualified for the second day of the PBR Team Series Championship. The Gamblers succeeded at making it into the final round of the Team Series Championship against the Texas Rattlers. However, the Rattlers would end up defeating the Gamblers to win the second annual PBR Team Series championship title.

In 2024, at the Team Series Championship, the Austin Gamblers succeeded in making it to the final round for the second year in a row, only this time against the Carolina Cowboys. The Gamblers ended up defeating the Cowboys to win the 2024 PBR Team Series Championship title.

In March 2025, the Austin Gamblers defeated the Texas Rattlers to win the PBR Monster Energy Team Challenge presented by Camping World at the Unleash the Beast Series (UTB) event in Albuquerque, New Mexico.

The Austin Gamblers finished second in the 2025 PBR Team Series regular season. As a result, they, as well as regular-season champions Florida Freedom and third-place Texas Rattlers received a first-round bye and automatically qualified for the second day of the Team Series Championship. The Freedom and Gamblers were eliminated after the second day of the event.

In early January 2026, the Austin Gamblers defeated the Texas Rattlers to win the Monster Energy Team Challenge at the UTB event in New York City, New York. In late January of the same year, the Gamblers defeated the Carolina Cowboys to win the Monster Energy Team Challenge at the UTB event in Sacramento, California. In February of the same year, the Gamblers defeated the Arizona Ridge Riders to win the Monster Energy Team Challenge at the UTB event in Pittsburgh, Pennsylvania. In mid-April, the Gamblers defeated the Kansas City Outlaws to win the second round of the Monster Energy Team Challenge Semifinals at the UTB event in Billings, Montana. The Gamblers moved on to face off against the Missouri Thunder at the Championship event during the UTB tour stop in Tacoma, Washington, in late April. In Tacoma, the Thunder defeated the Gamblers to win the inaugural Monster Energy Team Challenge Championship.

The Austin Gamblers finished second during the 2026 Team Series regular season. As a result, they received a first-round bye and automatically qualified for the second day of the Team Series Championship. They defeated the Texas Rattlers and moved on to the third and final day of competition. On the third day, the Gamblers were defeated by the Arizona Ridge Riders. In the game to see who would finish third, the Gamblers again defeated the Texas Rattlers.

== Honors ==
In 2009, Morães was inducted into the PBR Ring of Honor.

In 2018, he was inducted into the Texas Cowboy Hall of Fame.

In 2020, he was inducted into the Bull Riding Hall of Fame.

In 2023, he was ranked No. 4 on the list of the top 30 bull riders in PBR history.

== Personal life ==
Morães and his wife Flávia, married since 1989, have four children; Víctor, Jeremías, António, and Pedro. A devout Catholic who lists his favorite book as the Bible and the late Pope John Paul II as a personal idol, he is also a member of the Canção Nova missionary community in Brazil. He and his wife opened a Canção Nova mission in Texas. He chose to ride only half of the 1998 PBR season in order to participate in a religious mission in Brazil, but nonetheless finished fourteenth in that year's PBR standings, despite breaking his leg again at the Tuff Hedeman Championship Challenge in Fort Worth, Texas.

Morães is the godfather to 2026 PBR world champion John Crimber.
