= George Tillman Jr. =

American film director (born 1969)

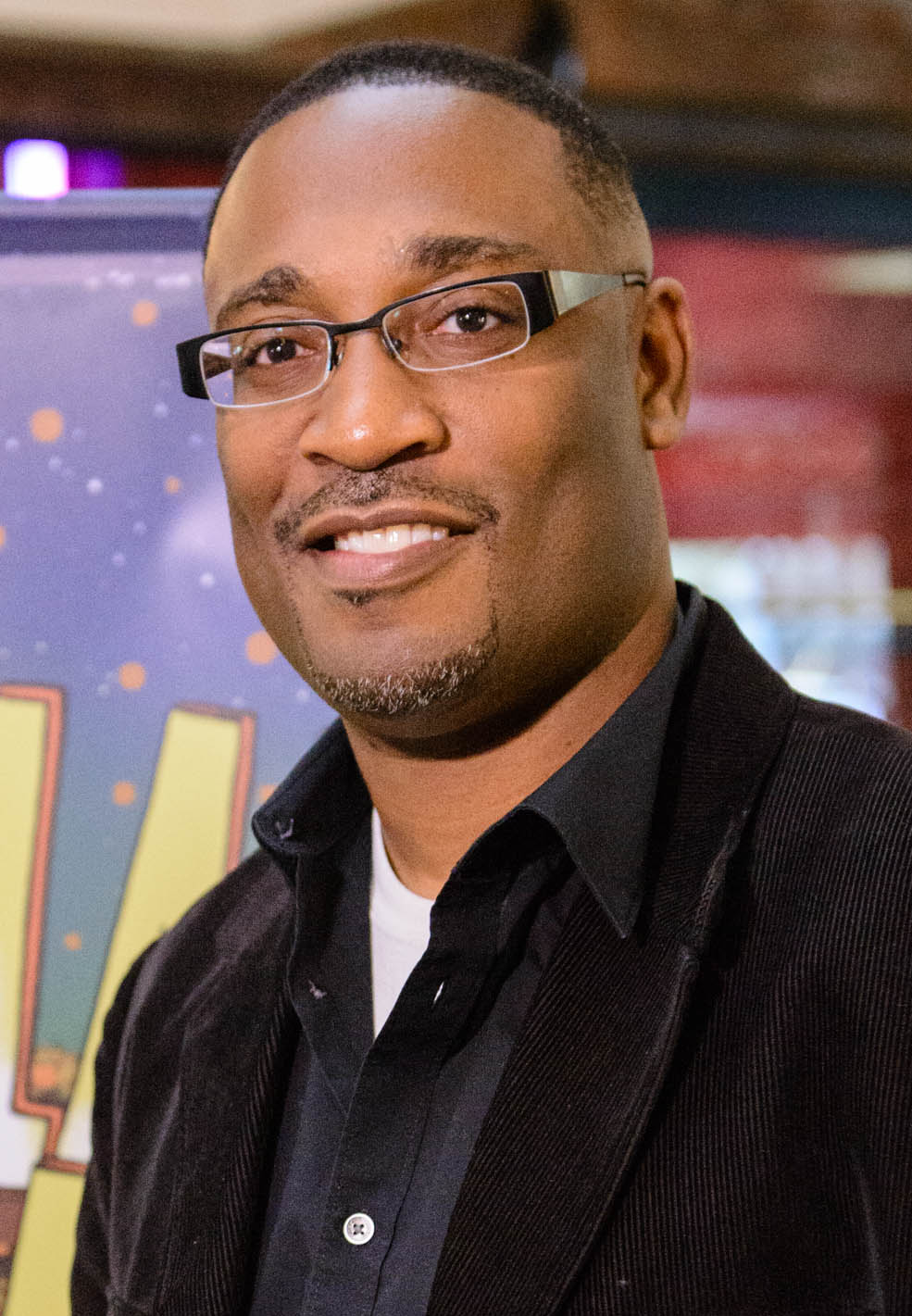
- Tillman Jr. at the 2013 MontClair Film Festival.
- Born: January 26, 1969 (age 57); Milwaukee, Wisconsin, U.S.
- Education: Columbia College Chicago
- Occupations: Film director; screenwriter; film producer
- Spouse: Marcia Wright
- Children: 1

George Tillman Jr. (born January 26, 1969) is an American filmmaker.

Tillman directed the films Soul Food (1997) and Men of Honor (2000). He is also the producer of Soul Food: The Series on television and the four films in the Barbershop series: Barbershop, Barbershop 2: Back in Business, Beauty Shop and Barbershop: The Next Cut. He directed the 2009 biopic Notorious, about the late Brooklyn-born rapper The Notorious B.I.G., and directed and produced the drama The Hate U Give (2018).

Tillman was nominated for the Black Film Award for Best Director for Soul Food (1997). Tillman was also nominated for the Black Reel Award for Best Director and Best Screenplay for Notorious (2009). In 2023, he won the Children's and Family Emmy Award for Outstanding Young Teen Series at the 2nd Children's and Family Emmy Awards as executive producer on the Disney+ sports drama series The Crossover.

== Early life ==
Tillman was born in Milwaukee, Wisconsin. His father, George Tillman, worked at the American Motors plant in Kenosha, Wisconsin, and his mother was a secretary. Throughout his early childhood, Tillman would borrow his father's 8mm camera and would start to shoot things with Milwaukee's Public-access television cable TV channel. By age eight, Tillman got his hands on his very first television script, All My Children, and wrote his first soap opera as well as his first five-minute show. Tillman recalled, years later, to an interviewer in regard to receiving the All My Children's script," I told them about a certain plot change that I wanted and I thought I could help the characters out…That was the beginning for me, the writing."

In 1975, Tillman became inspired to create his own films after seeing the film, Cooley High. To Tillman, Cooley High spoke to the African American audience in both tears and laughter, and Tillman decided he wanted to contribute to that medium, but did not necessarily know if he wanted to become an actor, writer or director. In 1973, when Tillman watched Five on the Black Hand Side and Claudine in 1974, he felt empowered and knew he wanted to become a filmmaker. "Those were the films that made me realize that African American films- this is before they started calling some films of that era Black exploitation films-spoke for us, and I wanted to be involved with that."

Tillman went to John Marshall High School in Milwaukee and he took Mass Communications Magnet Classes. As a teenager, Tillman made amateur videos and created Splice of Life, which was a program for a local Public-access television. After high school, Tillman attended Columbia College in Chicago and majored in Film and Video. Tillman decided to move to Chicago because he thought a lot was happening there creatively. "There is a lot of theater there, and there are a lot of things happening in Chicago that I wanted to be a part of, so that's where I went to film school," according to Tillman. While in film school, he created a 30-minute short, Paula, which was a story of a 17-year-old, single African American mother who works in a diner and motivates the people around her. Paula's success attributed to numerous awards including the Black Filmmaker's Hall of Fame Award "George Tillman Jr.". and winning the Midwest Regional, Dramatic Category, of the Academy of Motion Pictures Arts and Sciences' 19th Annual Student Academy Award competition (1992). In 1991, Tillman graduated from Columbia College and became a part of a directing and producing partnership with his college friend, Robert Teitel. Together, they created Menagerie Films. During that time, Tillman supported himself by being a production assistant. He helped work on various commercials, but he always knew he wanted to direct. "Usually, I was the first guy on the set and the last guy to leave—eighteen hours of hard work. And I just felt like if I want to direct, why am I doing this?" Tillman's only experience of being close to a director was made was when he worked on the film, Mo' Money. The writer of Mo' Money, Damon Wayans told the union that he wanted more African Americans to be a part of the crew, which is the major reason why Tillman got hired. Tillman was a set dresser and was able to see how they made the film. At that point, Tillman realized that if he wanted to direct he had to write his own script to make everything happen. "It was going to be a long road from being a PA (production's assistant) to a director."

Tillman began to write his script for Scenes for the Soul, and sent the script to New Line, but they passed on it. Initially, the budget to produce Scenes for the Soul was a million dollars, but Tillman and his partner, Tietel, could not raise a million. The amount they had raised was $150,000 and that was over a period of two years. Tillman had to resort to his film short, Paula, and decided to have a screening. He invited investors to come donate from anything to $500 to $5,000. By the end of the screening, Tillman and Tietel raised $130,000 and with that, started shooting.

== Career ==
=== Scenes for the Soul ===
In 1994, Tillman directed and wrote his own feature-length film, Scenes for the Soul, which was shot in Chicago. Tillman had thirty days to shoot the film and on top of that, work with a lot of actors who never acted before. In Scenes for the Soul, Tillman intertwines three stories based on the day in the life of a diverse group of African American characters. In 1995, Tillman finished editing the film. Upon completion, Tillman went to Hollywood with the copy of Scenes for the Soul and a few hundred dollars. Tillman was able to sell his film to George Jackson and Doug McHenry who bought it for Savoy Pictures for $1,000,000. However, Savoy Pictures went bankrupt before the film went out in theaters.

=== Soul Food ===
Tillman, disappointed that his film did not make it to screen, went to Chicago and wrote the screenplay to Soul Food. Tillman told the Chicago Tribune, "I wanted to make a movie about a black family in Middle America. I wanted to make a film where everyone can look at them and say, 'this is my family.'" When Tillman finished his screenplay, he returned to Hollywood. Tillman made sure to focus on female characters and tell a humble story about the importance of family.

When it was time for Tillman's agents to sell the script, they marketed it as an independently produced and low-budget project and asked the musician, Kenneth Edmonds, if he would want to contribute and record a soundtrack album. At the same time of requesting his musical talents, Edmonds and his wife/business partner, Tracey Edmonds, had recently formed a television and film development company. Both Kenneth and Tracey Edmonds loved Tillman's screenplay so much that they decide to make Soul Food their company's first production. Edmonds stated that "I read the script and just immediately went crazy over it. The story was so great and the characters were so real."

The Edmonds' were able to negotiate with 20th Century Fox to underwrite the film for $6.5 million. In the beginning, 20th Century Fox wanted to have a more experienced director, but the studio changed their decision once they viewed some of Tillman's past work. In October 1996, the filming of Soul Food began to commence as Kenneth Edmonds served as the executive producer, and both Tracey Edmonds and Robert Teitel were the producers. Originally, 20th Century Fox would have wanted to have more pre-production work and start the actual filming sometime during 1997, but the leading actresses—Vivica A. Fox, Vanessa L. Williams, and Nia Long- had other obligations they had to attend to, which made them unavailable for the next year. Tracey Edmonds was concerned about not having the same cast, so the production settled on "a schedule to accommodate everybody. We had only 38 days to shoot the movie and could not go a day over that." Due to Tillman's persistence, Soul Food's location took place in Chicago.

Tillman was pleased with the Edmonds' efforts in the film's production, stating "I was able to bounce a lot of ideas off of them. They were there every day to see what was going on, but they didn't interfere with what I was doing. They let me make the film."

On November 6, 1996, the production of Soul Food began on a thirty-day schedule. Tillman finished the film on schedule because he already had so much of the big ideas worked out in advance. Tillman told Murray during an interview, "I knew all the shots. I knew the locations…It was pretty much based on my experiences, so it wasn't hard for me."

Soul Food is originated from Tillman's passion to make a motivating and straight from the heart story about a modern African American family. It is based around three sisters that live in Chicago—Maxine (Vivica A. Fox), a full-time house wife and mother; Teri (Vanessa L. Williams), a strong willed attorney who pays little to no attention to her own personal life; and Bird (Nia Long), a hairdresser that is married to an ex-convict. When find out their mother is put in a hospital and their traditional big Sunday dinner is put on pause, the sisters struggle to keep their family together. Tillman was able to incorporate a lasting impression on the audience while touching on the big ideas of family tradition and bonds. According to Ty Burr of Entertainment Weekly in referencing Soul Food, "George Tillman Jr. writes and directs with homespun style and a minimum of flash, reminding us that behind a lot of clichés lie simple truths."

In September 1997, Soul Food reached theaters and earned $11 million during its first weekend. $14 million was earned by the end of its first week, which validated Tillman's success because the film received twice the amount it originally cost to make. Tillman later told Murray, "the shows were sold out, people were laughing, crying, it was just incredible." The grand total from Soul Food's release was $43 million and it also thrived in video sales. Initially, it was hoped that Soul Food would be able to attract white moviegoers, especially after all the success from the first week, but it did not work out that way. After learning that only 12 percent of the film's ticket buyers were white, Tillman stated "I do feel sometimes that white audiences are still not coming to black films as much as I would like. I think we're still working on that. But I'm really comfortable with where the film ended up." However, even with the lack of white supporters, it proved that African American audiences are able to make a film a commercial success. According to Jack Trout, president of Trout & Partners, in regard to black audiences, "this segment is really sizable, and Hollywood is just starting to recognize that."

Due to Soul Food's astonishing success, Tillman and Teitel signed a two-year deal with 20th Century Fox and changed their production company's name from Menagerie Films to State Street Pictures, which was their way of paying tribute to the early film years taken place in Chicago.

Tillman received offers to start a new project starring Steve Martin, and to create biographical films based on African American figures such as Dorothy Dandridge, Marvin Gaye, and Richard Pryor. Tillman told Murray in an interview, "I love Marvin Gaye..there's something about him and his struggle that I think will make a great film. It's so interesting to see how someone was so very talented and at the same time so very insecure." In regard to Tillman's next big upcoming film, he is going to base a film on the heroic story of Carl M. Brashear—the U. S. Navy's first African American master deep sear diver. It is a project that Tillman envisions to be similar to popular classics such as An Officer and a Gentleman and Glory. Tillman told Painter, "I love characters people can identify with and relate to—characters that go through struggles we can learn from in our everyday lives. I feel that with a lot of films today, we're getting away from that."

=== Men of Honor ===
Tillman's next big hit was his film, Men of Honor, starring Robert De Niro, and Cuba Gooding Jr. Tillman was inspired to do this film after seeing F. Gary Gray in The Negotiator (1998) because he realized there were little to no opportunities for African American directors to work with big time stars and he wanted to change that. When Tillman first got his hands on the script while he was editing Soul Food, he was very impressed by it. "I think a great script is when you have a great other world—a world that other people can explore and other people don't know about—and that script had that."

It was Tillman's first time experience being an African American director "working in a white film world." When working with De Niro and Gooding, Tillman felt a bit intimidated because he knew both were big stars. He knew De Niro could take up to fifty takes and knew from his research that he looks to the director to possess all the answers. "I remember I called him one day and I said, 'Bob, I wanna know how you like to work on a set because I wanna make it easy for you.' And he told me, 'I like what you did with Soul Food, you won't have any problems with me,'" according to Tillman. In regard to Gooding, he knew that he always had to know the back-story to his character. Tillman enjoyed what Gooding presented in his first film, Boyz n the Hood, and wanted to incorporate that persona. Tillman really had to do his research on both actors in order to achieve the direction he was going for in the film. "It all depends on a person, on an actor, and it's my job to figure those things out."

Tillman's transition between Soul Food and Men of Honor was challenging. Tillman was not used to all the visual effects that Men of Honor possessed. He also had a problem dealing with the crew because he felt that he had to prove himself. "Right away you have to let everyone know that you know what you're doing. That has to be done right away," Tillman said. The second hardest part for Tillman was shooting everything in a specific number of days. "There were times when I was shooting four and five scenes a day, because they try to put so much in the schedule." Tillman knew there was a lot to be done especially since the film cost $32 million to produce. Tillman also had to take into account of shooting under water and on top of the water. However, Tillman prevailed through all the obstacles came out proud with the overall product.

On November 10, 2000, Men of Honor was released in theaters. Men of Honor turned out to be a success especially overseas. The film generated $85 million.

=== Barbershop ===
While Tillman was editing Men of Honor, his producing partner Robert Teitel presented him with the Barbershop script, written by Mark Brown. Both Tillman and Teitel instantly knew that Barbershop was going to be comical yet hit an emotional chord with the audience. Barbershop stars Ice Cube, Anthony Anderson, and Cedric the Entertainer, and it is based on the social life of a South Side of Chicago Barbershop. The film also has three original songs by the famous R&B singer, Sherod Lindsey.

Tillman and Teitel took the script to Twentieth Century Fox, but they failed to pass it because they were not satisfied with the script. The same was said with Fox 2000 and Fox Searchlight. A bit discouraged, the two went to MGM due to one of the executive of Men of Honor, Alex Gardner, and they bought it.

In 2001, Barbershop began filming in Chicago. The film was located in the South Chicago community area and what was once a laundromat, was now the set for the barbershop. In comparison to Soul Food, which was made in 1997, Tillman still strived to show African Americans in a more positive outlook.

In regard to marketing the film, MGM spent $12 million in marketing alone because the company knew how important and effective it would be. According to Tillman, "if a studio get behind an African American film, which has universal themes, and markets it like any other movie, you can make a lot of money." Both Tillman and Robert made sure to be involved with the marketing scheme because they wanted to make sure that the film was delivered as a heartfelt yet comical piece.

On September 13, 2002, Barbershop was released in theaters and made a grand total of $77, 063, 924.

=== The Longest Ride ===
Tillman directed the 2015 romantic drama The Longest Ride, based on Nicholas Sparks' 2013 novel of the same name.

More recently, his production company State Street Pictures, signed a first look deal with Sony Pictures Television.

== Personal life ==
Tillman is married to actress Marcia Wright and has one child.

== Filmography ==
=== Films ===
Year	Title	Director	Producer	Writer
1992	Paula (Short film)	Yes	No	Yes
1995	Scenes for the Soul	Yes	No	Yes
1997	Soul Food	Yes	No	Yes
2000	Men of Honor	Yes	No	No
2009	Notorious	Yes	No	No
2010	Faster	Yes	No	No
2013	The Inevitable Defeat of Mister & Pete	Yes	Yes	No
2015	The Longest Ride	Yes	No	No
2018	The Hate U Give	Yes	Yes	No
2023	Big George Foreman	Yes	No	Yes

Producer only

- Barbershop (2002)
- Barbershop 2: Back in Business (2004)
- Beauty Shop (2005)
- Roll Bounce (2005)
- Nothing Like the Holidays (2008)
- Barbershop: The Next Cut (2016)

=== Television ===
Executive producer

Year	Title	Notes
2000–03	Soul Food	4 episodes
2005	Barbershop	10 episodes
2006	The Brandon T. Jackson Show	TV movie
2023	The Crossover	8 episodes

Director

Year	Title	Notes
2014–16	Power	3 episodes
2016	Marvel's Luke Cage	Episode: "Now You're Mine"
2016–19	This Is Us	3 episodes
2020	For Life	Episode: "Pilot"
2023	The Crossover	Episode: "X's & O's"

== See also ==
- Directors with two films rated "A+" by CinemaScore
