= The Longest Ride (novel) =

2013 novel by Nicholas Sparks

- Author: Nicholas Sparks
- Language: English
- Genre: Romance
- Publisher: Grand Central Publishing
- Publication date: September 17, 2013
- Publication place: United States
- Media type: Hardcover, audiobook, e-book
- Pages: 568
- ISBN: 978-1455520657
- OCLC: 829744527

The Longest Ride is Nicholas Sparks' 17th romance novel, released on September 17, 2013.

== Summary ==
After being trapped in an isolated car crash, the life of elderly widower Ira Levinson becomes entwined with a young college student, Sophia Danko, and the cowboy whom she loves, a young man named Luke Collins. The novel is told through the perspectives of these three characters as they go through their lives, both separately and together.

Ira Levinson, ninety-one years old and already in poor health, is just holding on; remaining alert only because his wife Ruth, who has died, appears as an image to help him remember their life together: how they met, the paintings they collected and the dark days of World War II.

Just a few miles away, Sophia, a student at Wake Forest college, is about to have her life change forever as she meets an unexpected love, Luke. Luke is a cowboy and risk-taking bull-rider, unlike anyone she has ever known. Together they experience the joys of love as well as the difficulties that come with Luke's dangerous career.

Two couples who have little in common, yet whose lives will converge with unexpected poignancy.

== Black Mountain College ==
The inspiration for the book was Black Mountain College (1933–1957), a liberal arts school whose faculty included some of the most prominent names in the modern art movement. Styles mentioned in the book include Abstract Expressionism, Futurism, Bauhaus, Cubism, and Lyrical Abstractionism.

The backstory of characters Ira and Ruth Levinson is that they visited Black Mountain College during their honeymoon and met with students and artists at the school artists' exhibition. Ira bought six paintings for Ruth which would be the beginning of more than a thousand paintings they would collect focusing on 20th-century American modern art. Artists in the book include Ken Noland, Ray Johnson, Robert Rauschenberg, Elaine de Kooning, Willem de Kooning, Susan Weil, Pat Passlof, Jackson Pollock, Jasper Johns, Andy Warhol and Pablo Picasso.

== Film ==
A film adaptation, from 20th Century Fox, released on April 10, 2015. The film is directed by George Tillman Jr., with the screenplay adapted by Craig Bolotin. Britt Robertson plays Sophia Danko, with Oona Chaplin as Ruth, Scott Eastwood as Luke Collins, Jack Huston as Young Ira, Barry Ratcliffe as the Auctioneer and, Alan Alda as Older Ira.

Filming began on June 16, 2014 in Wilmington, Jacksonville, and Winston-Salem, NC.
