= Scott Eastwood =

American actor and producer (born 1986)

- Eastwood in 2025
- Born: Scott Clinton Reeves; March 21, 1986 (age 40); Monterey, California, U.S.
- Other name: Scott Reeves
- Education: Loyola Marymount University
- Occupation: Actor
- Years active: 2006–present
- Parents: Clint Eastwood (father); Jacelyn Reeves (mother)
- Relatives: Kyle Eastwood (half-brother); Alison Eastwood (half-sister); Francesca Eastwood (half-sister)

Scott Eastwood (born Scott Clinton Reeves; March 21, 1986) is an American actor. The son of the Hollywood actor Clint Eastwood, he has starred in several of his father's films, including Flags of Our Fathers (2006), Gran Torino (2008), Invictus (2009), and Trouble with the Curve (2012). He also starred in Texas Chainsaw (2013), Fury (2014), The Longest Ride (2015), Suicide Squad (2016), Snowden (2016), The Fate of the Furious (2017), Pacific Rim Uprising (2018), The Outpost (2020), Wrath of Man (2021), Fast X (2023), 1992 (2024) and Lucky Strike (2026).

== Early life ==
Scott Clinton Reeves was born on March 21, 1986, in Community Hospital of the Monterey Peninsula in Monterey, California. He is the son of actor-director Clint Eastwood and flight attendant Jacelyn Reeves. He has one younger sister, Kathryn, and at least six half-siblings, including Kyle, Alison, and Francesca. Eastwood was raised in Carmel-by-the-Sea until age ten, after which he moved with his mother to Hawaii. He graduated from high school in 2003. He attended Loyola Marymount University in Los Angeles, where he graduated with a communications degree in 2008.

== Career ==
Eastwood in 2026

Eastwood began his career by using his birth surname to avoid nepotism, although there is another actor named Scott Reeves. "I've auditioned for pretty much every one of my father's movies", he said in 2015, stating that he was rejected for the Clint Eastwood-directed American Sniper. He began using Eastwood as his surname in 2008.

He briefly appeared in his father's films Flags of Our Fathers (2006) and Gran Torino (2008), and played Joel Stransky in Invictus (2009). In April 2010, Eastwood played the lead role in Enter Nowhere. He also had roles in his father's Trouble with the Curve (2012), John Luessenhop's Texas Chainsaw (2013), David Ayer's Fury (2014), appeared in the 2015 music video for Taylor Swift's "Wildest Dreams", and starred alongside Britt Robertson in the 2015 film adaptation of Nicholas Sparks' novel The Longest Ride.

In 2016, Eastwood played Lieutenant GQ Edwards in the film Suicide Squad, an adaptation of the DC Comics series. Also that year, he starred alongside Joseph Gordon-Levitt and Shailene Woodley in the biographical drama film Snowden, directed by Oliver Stone, which was released in September.

In 2017, he played a special agent in the action film The Fate of the Furious, and starred in Overdrive, a thriller film which was shot in Paris and Marseille. In 2018, he starred as Nate Lambert in the science fiction follow-up Pacific Rim Uprising. His subsequent roles included The Outpost (2020), Wrath of Man (2021), Fast X (2023) and 1992 (2024).

== Personal life ==
In August 2017, Eastwood opened up to the media about the death of his former girlfriend, Jewel Brangman, who was killed on September 7, 2014, by a faulty Takata airbag. The airbag exploded in her face after a minor automobile accident in her 2001 Honda Civic. Metal shrapnel from the explosion severed her carotid artery.

Eastwood learned Brazilian jiu-jitsu after Paul Walker got him into martial arts.

In 2022, Eastwood spoke about his experiences in Hollywood and compared it to being "in a circus." He stated "it's an amazing circus at times, but living on the road, I think it would be tough. I don't have a family yet, but I want that some day, and I think about what that would look like with kids and being away from them. That worries me."

== Filmography ==
Key
†	Denotes films that have not yet been released

=== Film ===
Year	Title	Role	Notes
2006	Flags of Our Fathers	Roberto Lundsford	as Scott Reeves
2007	An American Crime	Eric Destroy	as Scott Reeves
2007	Pride	Jake Ballers	as Scott Reeves
2008	Player 5150	Brian Vicks	as Scott Reeves
2008	Gran Torino	Trey Harmful	as Scott Reeves
2009	Shannon's Rainbow	Joey Milton	
2009	Invictus	Joel Stransky	
2011	Thule	Amn. D.W. Anderson	Short film
2011	Enter Nowhere	Tom Deep	
2011	The Lion of Judah	Jack Leones	Voice role
2012	The Forger	Ryan Felter	
2012	Trouble with the Curve	Billy Clark	
2012	Chasing Mavericks	Gordy	Uncredited
2013	Texas Chainsaw 3D	Deputy Carl Hartman	
2014	Fury	Sergeant Miles	
2014	The Perfect Wave	Ian McCormack	Also associate producer
2014	Dawn Patrol	John Piper	Also producer
2015	The Bachelor with Dogs and Scott Eastwood	Himself	Short film
2015	The Longest Ride	Luke Collins	
2015	Diablo	Jackson	
2015	Mercury Plains	Mitch Davis	
2016	Snowden	Trevor James	
2016	Suicide Squad	"G.Q." Edwards	
2017	Walk of Fame	Drew	Also executive producer
2017	The Fate of the Furious	Little Nobody	
2017	Live by Night	Aiden "Danny" Coughlin	Deleted scene
2017	Overdrive	Andrew Foster	
2018	Pacific Rim Uprising	Nathan Lambert	
2019	The Outpost	Clinton Romesha	
2021	Wrath of Man	Jan	
2021	Dangerous	Dylan "D" Forrester	
2022	I Want You Back	Noah	
2023	Fast X	Little Nobody	
2024	1992	Riggin Bigby	
2025	Alarum	Joe Travers	
2025	Tin Soldier	Nash Cavanaugh	
2025	Stolen Girl	Robeson	
2025	Regretting You	Chris Grant	
2026	Lucky Strike	John Castle	
TBA	Wind River: The Next Chapter †	TBA	Post-production
TBA	Red Card †	Dane Harris	Filming

=== Television ===
Year	Title	Role	Notes
2013	Chicago Fire	Officer Jim Barnes	Guest role (2 episodes)
2014	Chicago P.D.	Officer Jim Barnes	Episode: "Stepping Stone"; uncredited

=== Music videos ===
Year	Title	Role	Artist
2015	"Wildest Dreams"	Robert Kingsley	Taylor Swift

== Awards and nominations ==
Year	Ceremony	Award(s)	Nominated work	Result
2014	National Board of Review Awards	Best Cast	Fury	Won
2015	Teen Choice Awards	Choice Movie Actor: Drama	The Longest Ride	Won
2015	Teen Choice Awards	Choice Movie: Breakout Star	The Longest Ride	Nominated
2016	Teen Choice Awards	Choice Movie Actor: AnTEENcipated	Suicide Squad	Nominated
2022	Golden Raspberry Awards	Worst Actor	Dangerous	Nominated
2026	Golden Raspberry Awards	Worst Actor	Alarum	Nominated
