= Guilherme Marchi =

Brazilian bull rider

Personal information
- Born: Guilherme Antônio Marchi; July 22, 1982 (age 44) Itupeva, São Paulo, Brazil
- Height: 6 ft 0 in (1.83 m)
- Weight: 198 lb (90 kg)

Sport
- Sport: Rodeo
- Event: Bull riding
- Turned pro: 1999
- Retired: 2018

Achievements and titles
- World finals: 2008 PBR World Champion; 2005 PBR World Finals Event Champion

Guilherme Antônio Marchi (pronounced Gih-lare-mee Mar-kee) (born July 22, 1982) is a Brazilian former professional rodeo cowboy who specialized in bull riding, and competed in the Professional Bull Riders (PBR) circuit. He was the 2008 PBR World Champion.

In 2023, Marchi was ranked No. 14 on the list of the top 30 bull riders in PBR history.

== Background ==
Marchi is 6 feet 0 inches (1.83 m) tall and weighs 198 pounds (90 kg). He is from Leme, São Paulo, and is of Italian descent on his father's side. He rode bulls right-handed. His special interests include soccer, team roping, and surfing.

== Career ==
Marchi rode the first few years of his professional career in Brazil before moving to the United States. He competed very briefly in the Championship Bull Riding (CBR) tour in 2004 before joining the PBR full-time. He debuted late in the Built Ford Tough Series (BFTS) season that year, qualifying for his first PBR World Finals and finishing 41st in the world. After finishing in the runner-up position for the PBR World Championship in three consecutive years, he won his world title in 2008. Statistically, Marchi was one of the most consistent riders on the tour. He would go on to qualify for the World Finals all 15 years of his PBR career (2004 through 2018).

In 2005, Guilherme Marchi was the biggest threat to Justin McBride's goal of being the PBR World Champion. McBride won, Marchi came in second. However, Marchi was the PBR World Finals event champion that year.

In 2006, during one of the last few regular-season BFTS events before the World Finals, Marchi won the first round of the event in Greensboro, North Carolina, and became eligible for the Mossy Oak Shootout. He successfully rode his bull and won the $90,000 bounty. At the World Finals, Marchi once again failed to win when fellow Brazilian Adriano Moraes came from behind to claim the PBR world championship, with Marchi placing second.

Yet again, in 2007, Marchi finished the season in the No. 2 position behind Justin McBride at the PBR World Finals in Las Vegas.

In 2008, Marchi dominated the PBR circuit, riding nearly 75% of his bulls, winning five events, and earning over $1.5 million (nearly three times as much as any other PBR rider) on his way to his PBR world championship title and the $1 million bonus that went with it.

In 2009, Marchi won the PBR Canada Finals event in Calgary, Alberta.

In March 2014, in the opening round of the BFTS event in Phoenix, Arizona, Marchi became the first bull rider to successfully complete 500 qualified rides in the PBR, riding Pandora's Pyxis.

On April 8, 2017, Marchi rode Shocker for 86.25 points in Round 2 of the BFTS event in Billings, Montana. In doing so, he became the first PBR rider to reach 600 qualified rides and received a commemorative belt buckle.

On August 12, 2018, Marchi announced that 2018 would be his final year of bull riding, with the intention of retiring after the PBR World Finals. He finished his professional career with 635 qualified rides (the most in PBR history), 36 PBR event wins, 15 consecutive qualifications to the PBR World Finals (2004 through 2018), and over $5.3 million in career earnings.

Marchi officially retired from bull riding following his victory at the 2018 PBR Brazil event in Goiânia, Goiás.

== Post-career ==
In 2023, Marchi became the assistant coach to head coach J.W. Hart of the Kansas City Outlaws; one of eight bull riding teams in the PBR Team Series, which debuted the previous year and holds events in the United States from the summer through autumn. It concludes with the Team Series at T-Mobile Arena in Las Vegas, Nevada. Marchi also works on the team's recruiting and development efforts for riders in Brazil. In early August of that year, the Outlaws won their own hometown event; Outlaw Days in Kansas City, Missouri. Two weeks later, the Outlaws won their second event of the season at Stampede Days in Nashville, Tennessee; the hometown event of rival team, the Nashville Stampede. The Outlaws later won the second-to-last event of the 2023 regular season event at Ridge Rider Days in Glendale, Arizona; the hometown event of rival team, the Arizona Ridge Riders. In October, the Outlaws finished in second place during the Team Series regular season. As a result, both them and regular-season champions, the Austin Gamblers, received first-round byes and automatically qualified for the second day of the Team Series Championship. The Outlaws were eliminated after the second day of the Championship.

In 2024, the Kansas City Outlaws were the Team Series regular-season champions. As a result, both them and second-place team, the Carolina Cowboys, received a first-round bye and automatically qualified for the second day of the Team Series Championship. The Outlaws finished third at the Team Series Championship that year.

The Kansas City Outlaws were eliminated after the first day of the 2025 Team Series Championship event.

In January 2026, the Kansas City Outlaws defeated the Oklahoma Wildcatters to win the Monster Energy Team Challenge at the Unleash the Beast Series (UTB) event in Milwaukee, Wisconsin. In early March of the same year, the Outlaws defeated the Austin Gamblers to win the Monster Energy Team Challenge at the UTB event in Little Rock, Arkansas. In late March, the Outlaws defeated the Arizona Ridge Rides to win the Monster Energy Team Challenge at the UTB event in Indianapolis, Indiana.

The Kansas City Outlaws finished sixth during the 2026 Team Series regular season. On the first day of the Team Series Championship, they were defeated by the Texas Rattlers, but came back to the Last Chance Game, where the Arizona Ridge Riders eliminated both the Outlaws and New York Mavericks.

== Honors ==
On November 5, 2019, Marchi was inducted into the PBR Ring of Honor.

On May 14, 2022, he was inducted into the Bull Riding Hall of Fame.

In 2023, he was ranked No. 14 on the list of the top 30 bull riders in PBR history.

== Personal life ==
On April 19, 2018, Marchi married long-time girlfriend Maria in Texas. She is his second wife. They have a son. Marchi also has two other children, a daughter and son, from his first wife, Patricia. All of his children were born in the United States.

While competing in the U.S. PBR circuit, Marchi lived in Ferris, Texas. After retiring from bull riding, he moved back to Brazil with his family, where he helped his father-in-law run his ranch, put on bull-riding clinics, and trained bucking bulls.

Since becoming assistant coach to the Kansas City Outlaws, Marchi moved back to the United States; now residing in head coach J.W. Hart's hometown of Marietta, Oklahoma.
