= The Family Business (American TV series) =

- Genre: Crime drama; Action; Romance; Thriller; Gangster; Workplace drama
- Created by: Carl Weber
- Based on: The Family Business series by Carl Weber
- Starring: Ernie Hudson; Valarie Pettiford; Darrin Henson; Javicia Leslie; Sean Ringgold; Tami Roman; Miguel A. Núñez Jr.; Arrington Foster; Dylan Weber; Emilio Rivera; KJ Smith; Yadi Valerio; Brely Evans; Ben Stephens; Stan Shaw; LisaRaye McCoy; Patrick Duffy; Deyshaun Tucker; RonReaco Lee; Trisha Mann-Grant; Blac Chyna; Christian Keyes; Gillian lliana Waters-White; Kearia Schroeder; Bern Nadette Stanis; Flex Alexander; Michael Jai White
- Country of origin: United States
- Original language: English
- No. of seasons: 6
- No. of episodes: 53

Production
- Executive producers: Nikaya D. Brown Jones; Carl Weber; Maureen Guthman; Ernie Hudson; Trey Haley
- Producers: Ben Stephens; Christian Keyes; Michelle Suite; Lorisa Bates; Sean Ringgold; Abe Brown
- Running time: 40–47 minutes
- Production companies: Tri Destined Studios; Urban Books Media

Original release
- Network: BET
- Release: November 13, 2018 – January 29, 2019
- Network: BET+
- Release: July 2, 2020 – December 18, 2025
- Network: Paramount+

Related
- The Family Business: New Orleans

The Family Business is an American crime family drama created by Carl Weber and based on his bestselling crime drama book series. Originally developed as an independent film franchise, BET produced it as a series in 2018.

The series follows the Duncans, an upstanding family that owns and operates an exotic car dealership in New York. It stars Ernie Hudson and Valarie Pettiford. In August 2026, the series was renewed for a seventh season and is set to move to Paramount+. A spin-off The Family Business: New Orleans starring Lela Rochon premiered on January 23, 2025 on BET+.

== Cast and characters ==
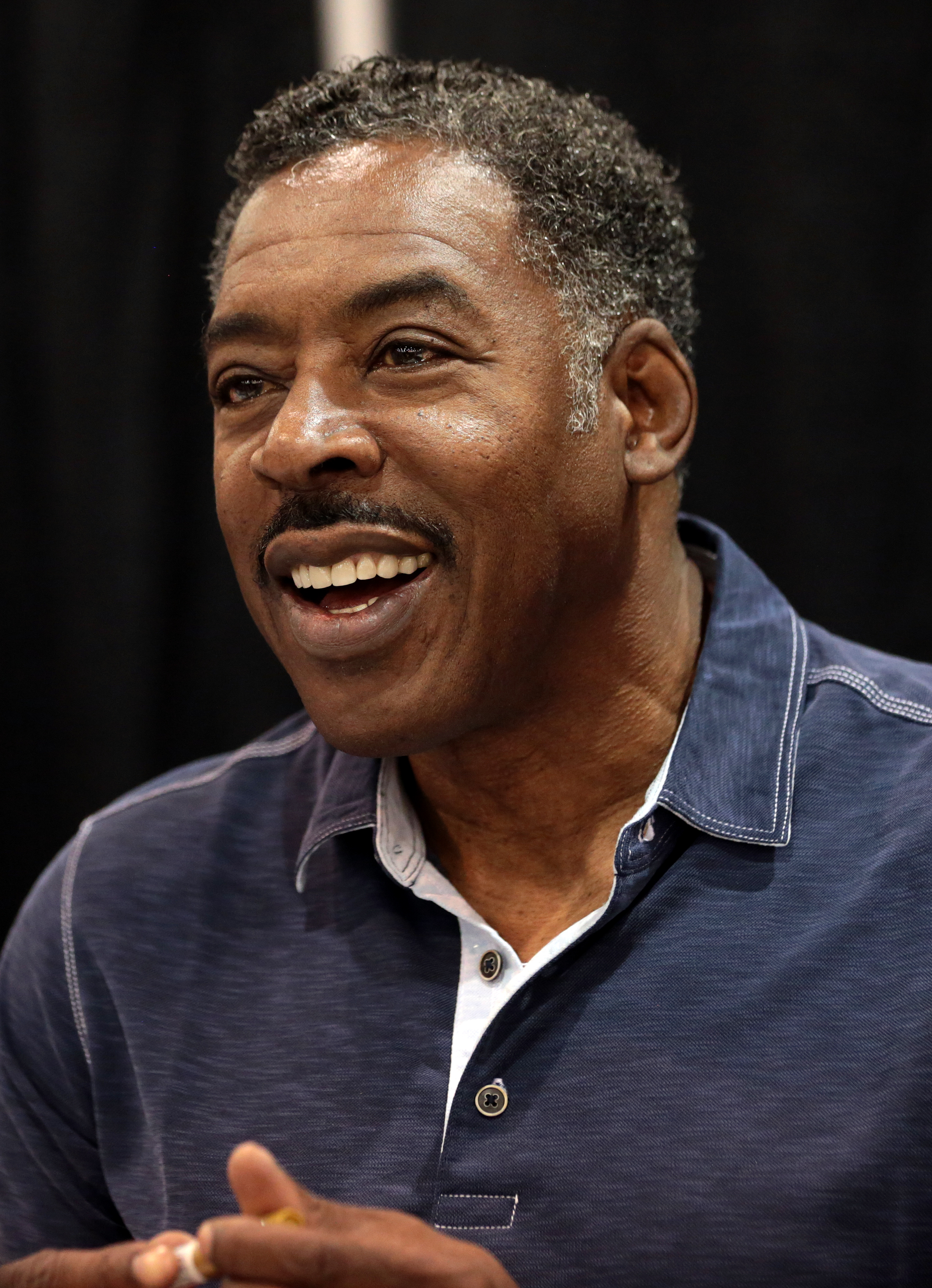
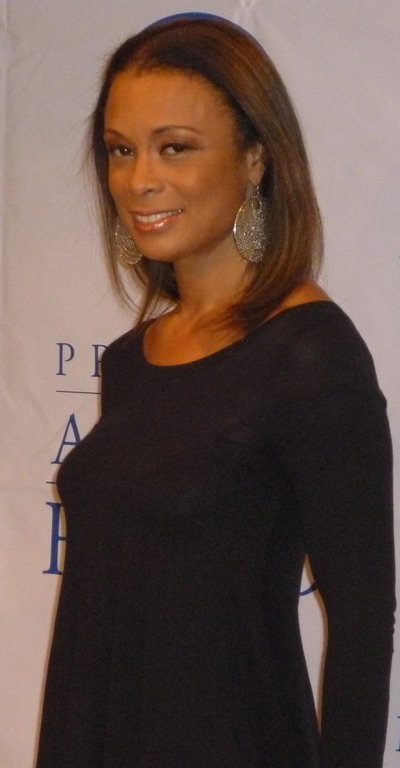
Ernie Hudson and Valarie Pettiford star in the series.

=== Main ===
- Ernie Hudson as Lavernius "L.C." Duncan - L.C. Duncan is the patriarch and CEO of the Duncan Family business: Duncan Motors. Known as a no nonsense affluent businessman in the legitimate and underworld, L.C.'s reputation precedes him. However, it's finally time to sit back and enjoy life with his wife and grandchildren, so he has finally decided it's time to pass on the mantle of leadership.
- Valarie Pettiford as Charlotte "Chippy" Duncan - The Duncan matriarch who keeps the family together no matter what the challenges are. She can be sweet as pie, yet tough as nails. Her love for her husband and family can never be challenged.
- Darrin Henson as Orlando Duncan - Orlando is the handsome, smart and edgy, newly appointed CEO of Duncan Motors. His new appointment comes not only as a surprise but also with jealousy and controversy despite his workaholic tendencies.
- Javicia Leslie as Paris Duncan - Paris is the youngest daughter of the Duncan family. A glamorous spoiled party girl who always gets what she wants and knows how to handle herself in any situation. She's educated, seductive and knows how to handle a gun.
- Sean Ringgold as Junior Duncan - The oldest of the Duncan children and as large as any professional football player. Junior is the family's security specialist. No matter what the situation is, he is willing to do whatever it takes to protect his family.
- Tami Roman as London Duncan-Grant - London is the oldest daughter and mother of Mariah & Maria. She's appearing to be a home body for the most part, but London has many tantalizing secrets of her own.
- Miguel A. Núñez Jr. as Harris Grant - Harris is the husband of the Duncans' oldest daughter London and the Duncan family lawyer and fixer. He has his hands in most of the family business dealings and was the most surprised when L.C. passed him up for Orlando to run the family business.
- Arrington Foster as Rio Duncan - Paris's flamboyant twin brother who manages a popular club & lounge in New York City. Rio is willing to do whatever he can to prove to his father that he deserves the same respect as his brothers.
- Dylan Weber as Nevada Duncan - The teenage son of Vegas and heir to the Duncan leadership. Nevada is the only grandson being groomed to run the Duncan family business.
- Emilio Rivera (season 1: recurring later) as Alejandro Zuniga - Alejandro is a savvy Mexican crime boss in Los Angeles who is the leader of Zuniga Cartel and is a longtime foe of the Duncan family. He's trying to mend fences through his son, but the jury is still out on whether he plans on stabbing them in the back.
- Clifton Powell (season 1: recurring later) as Uncle Lou Duncan - Lou is L.C.'s brother and partner. While L.C. is the face of Duncan Motors, Lou and his crew are the ones who get their hands dirty both under the hood of cars and in the streets.
- Yadi Rivera as Consuela Zuniga (season 4; recurring seasons 1–3) - Alejandro's hot and fierce wife and mother of Miguel. Known as "La Madrina", she is as cruel, brutal and bloody as her husband and cartel boss, Alejandro.
- LisaRaye McCoy as Donna Duncan (seasons 1–2, 4, guest in season 3)
- KJ Smith as Sasha Duncan (seasons 1–2, guest in season 3) - Paris and Rio's lustful cousin and a hot woman of the Duncan family. Like her cousin Paris, she is intelligent, manipulative, beautiful, sexy, knows how to seduce and eliminate people like no one else.
- Dylan Weber as Nevada Duncan - The teenage son of Vegas and heir to the Duncan leadership. Nevada is the only grandson being groomed to run the Duncan family business.
- Michael Jai White as Vegas Duncan - Vegas is the wise and mysterious missing brother of the Duncan family. He is respected by all but his whereabouts are known to few.
- Stan Shaw as Larry Duncan (Seasons 3–4)
- Brely Evans as Sonya Duncan (season 4, recurring seasons 1–3) - married to Junior Duncan
- Ben Stephens as Curtis Duncan (season 4) - Curtis is a bounty hunter and the nephew of L.C. Duncan
- Patrick Duffy as Sheriff KD Shrugs (season 5)
- Deyshaun Tucker as Roman Duncan (season 6: recurring, season 5)
- RonReaco Lee as Bobby Boyd (season 6: recurring, season 5) - lovers of Karrin and Paris Duncan - also appears in The Black Hamptons
- Trisha Mann-Grant as Dominique Leroux (season 6: recurring, seasons 4—5)
- Blac Chyna as Karrin (season 6) - ex-girlfriend/fiancee of Bobby Boyd - also appears in The Black Hamptons
- Christian Keyes as Niles Monroe (season 6: recurring, seasons 1—5) - love interest and later, fiancee of Paris Duncan
- Gillian Iliana Waters-White as Kendra (season 6) - new love interest of Vegas Duncan
- Kearia Schroeder as Nefertiti (season 6: recurring, seasons 3—4) - sister of Elijah and new love interest of Curtis Duncan
- Flex Alexander as Low Jack (season 6: recurring, seasons 2—5) - new love interest/fiancee of London Duncan
- Bern Nadette Stanis as Nee Nee Duncan (season 6: recurring, seasons 4—5) - wife of Larry Duncan

=== Recurring ===
- Armand Assante as Sal Dash (season 1) - Mafia crime boss and close ally to the Duncan family. Sal has a major concern with certain changes that are happening within the Duncan family as well as a purchase he made with L.C. Duncan.
- Carlos Sotelo as Miguel Zuniga (season 1) - Miguel is the sharp-suited attractive son of Mexican crime Boss Alejandro Zuniga. He emerges with an opportunity that could save the Duncans from disaster but only if he can resist the temptation of their youngest daughter, Paris.
- Nicholas Turturro as Councilman Ronald Sims
- Travis Winfrey as Sebastian
- James Black as Rob
- Bubba Ganter as James
- Antoine Holmes Sr. and Spencer Holmes as Carl and Carlos, the Duncan's bodyguards
- Franky G as Juan Rodriguez
- Kimberly Patterson as Ruby Moss - Ruby is a young woman from Jamaica, who found herself in an unforeseen circumstance where she had to step up to the plate for her family by signing up with an escorting agency. With her first client being Orlando Duncan (the heir to the family's car and drug business), she managed to steal his heart unexpectedly.
- Christian Madsen as Vinnie Dash
- Anthony Montgomery as Elijah (seasons 2–6)
- Carl Gilliard as Brother Minister (seasons 2–4)
- Sadie Brook as Doll (seasons 1–3)
- Brandee Evans as Sage
- Todd Anthony as Lamont Hudson - also appears in Carl Weber's Influence
- Denise Boutte as Raven Bonclair (Seasons 3–4)
- Sheila E. as Maude (Season 3)
- Jasper Cole as Cory Black
- Lew Temple as Billy Bob, a local drug dealer
- Horace Dodd as Aires Cora
- Jasmin Brown as Charmaine, the no-nonsense sister of Brother X
- Kearia Schroeder as Nefertiti, the daughter of Brother Minister
- Desiree Mitchell as Melanie Grant, a secret child to someone within the Duncan family
- Dawn Halfkenny as Brandi (seasons 2–4)
- Eva LaRue as Kim
- Treach as Brother X (seasons 2–4)
- Erica Joy as Holly - new love interest of Brother X (seasons 3—4)
- Nazo Bravo as Demetri Igor (season 3) - a Russian oligarch
- Lindsay Diann as Danielle
- Stan Shaw as Larry Duncan (season 4)
- Nayirah Teshali as Lauryn Duncan (season 4)
- Sacaiah Shaw as Kenny Duncan (season 4)
- Vincent M. Ward as Cornelius (season 5)
- Reggie Luck as Darnel (season 5)
- Tonoa Smith as Coretta (season 5)
- Blue Kimble as Christopher Johnson (season 5)
- Dondi M. Jones as Detroit Red (season 6)

=== Notable guest stars ===
- Robert Picardo as Bernie (Seasons 1-2)
- Malik Yoba as Randy Moss (Season 1)
- Gary Dourdan as Trent Duncan (Season 1)
- D.C. Young Fly as Mack (Season 1)
- Brandon T. Jackson as Marquis Duncan (Season 5)

== Episodes ==
Season	Episodes		Originally released		
Season	Episodes		First released	Last released	Network
1	8		November 13, 2018	January 29, 2019	BET
2	12	6	July 2, 2020	August 6, 2020	BET+
2	12	6	December 31, 2020		BET+
3	12		October 14, 2021		BET+
4	10		September 1, 2022	October 27, 2022	BET+
5	10		July 4, 2024	August 29, 2024	BET+
6	10		October 23, 2025	December 18, 2025	BET+

=== Season 1 (2018–19) ===
No. overall	No. in season	Title	Directed by	Written by	Original release date	U.S. viewers (millions)
1	1	"We Are At War"	Trey Haley	Carl Weber	November 13, 2018	0.38
A upstanding New York African American upper class family's empire is threatened when a supplier's betrayal shakes up their business and has the power to shake up the family.
2	2	"The Games Have Just Begun"	Trey Haley	Carl Weber	November 20, 2018	0.43
LC brings down the hammers as he tries to figure out what happened to his missing drug shipment. Meanwhile, Harris receives an offer from an ally of the family.
3	3	"Show Down"	Trey Haley	Carl Weber	November 27, 2018	0.54
A recent shooting throws the entire family into turmoil.
4	4	"Answered Questions"	Trey Haley	Carl Weber	December 4, 2018	0.58
7 months have passed since the shooting, but the Duncans are still dealing with the ramifications. Nevada begins to ask some serious questions on his mom's death. Orlando seeks help from Harris to him find Rudy. Vinny Dash, Sal's only living son is on the loose and is dangerous.
5	5	"The Heat Is On"	Trey Haley	Carl Weber	January 8, 2019	0.51
While the Duncans welcome a new addition into their family, Orlando reveals a new drug invention to LC. A tragic discovery is made during the hunt for a missing family member.
6	6	"A Death in the Family"	Trey Haley	Carl Weber	January 15, 2019	0.44
As the Duncans gather to say goodbye to one of their own, Junior and Paris team up to catch a killer. Chippy shares her concerns about HEAT.
7	7	"Home Coming"	Trey Haley	Carl Weber	January 22, 2019	0.44
Orlando's fate puts the entire family on edge. Consuela concocts a plan of revenge against the duncans. LC offers to help a reluctant someone.
8	8	"Mexican Stand Off"	Trey Haley	Carl Weber	January 29, 2019	0.51
While Sasha's return is celebrated, Paris begin to grow jealous of her cousin's warm welcome. Consuela strikes back at the family.

=== Season 2 (2020) ===
No. overall	No. in season	Title	Directed by	Written by	Original release date
Part 1
9	1	"Back to Life"	Trey Haley	Carl Weber	July 2, 2020
10	2	"Put a Ring on It"	Trey Haley	Carl Weber	July 9, 2020
11	3	"Introducing Brother X"	Trey Haley	Carl Weber	July 16, 2020
12	4	"Heat It Up!"	Trey Haley	Carl Weber	July 23, 2020
13	5	"You Can Run But You Can't Hide"	Trey Haley	Carl Weber	July 30, 2020
14	6	"Casualties of War"	Trey Haley	Carl Weber	August 6, 2020
Part 2
15	7	"Take No Prisoners"	Trey Haley	Carl Weber	December 31, 2020
16	8	"The Nuclear Option"	Trey Haley	Carl Weber	December 31, 2020
17	9	"Mothers and Their Sons"	Trey Haley	Carl Weber	December 31, 2020
18	10	"I Don't Want to Lose My Queen"	Trey Haley	Carl Weber	December 31, 2020
19	11	"Deploy the Drones"	Trey Haley	Carl Weber	December 31, 2020
20	12	"The Hunt for Brother X"	Trey Haley	Carl Weber	December 31, 2020

=== Season 3 (2021) ===
No. overall	No. in season	Title	Directed by	Written by	Original release date
21	1	"The Heat Is On"	Trey Haley	Carl Weber	October 14, 2021
22	2	"Who Is Curtis Duncan"	Trey Haley	Carl Weber	October 14, 2021
23	3	"The Hunt for Consuela"	Trey Haley	Carl Weber	October 14, 2021
24	4	"What's Better Than Heat? Fire!"	Trey Haley	Carl Weber	October 14, 2021
25	5	"Time to Start Washing the Money"	Trey Haley	Carl Weber	October 14, 2021
26	6	"Blood on Your Hands"	Trey Haley	Carl Weber	October 14, 2021
27	7	"Brotherly Love"	Trey Haley	Carl Weber	October 14, 2021
28	8	"Money Has No Friends"	Trey Haley	Carl Weber	October 14, 2021
29	9	"Brother X Strikes Again"	Trey Haley	Carl Weber	October 14, 2021
30	10	"Bye, Bye, Harris"	Trey Haley	Carl Weber	October 14, 2021
31	11	"Destroying the Family Business"	Trey Haley	Carl Weber	October 14, 2021
32	12	"Flipping the Script"	Trey Haley	Carl Weber	October 14, 2021

=== Season 4 (2022) ===
No. overall	No. in season	Title	Directed by	Written by	Original release date
33	1	"Crazy as Duncans"	Trey Haley	Carl Weber	September 1, 2022
34	2	"Everybody Wants Harris"	Trey Haley	Carl Weber	September 1, 2022
35	3	"Family Visit"	Trey Haley	Carl Weber	September 8, 2022
36	4	"Trigger Happy!"	Trey Haley	Carl Weber	September 15, 2022
37	5	"Dead Silence"	Trey Haley	Carl Weber	September 22, 2022
38	6	"Home Coming"	Trey Haley	Carl Weber	September 29, 2022
39	7	"Vengeance Is Mine"	Trey Haley	Carl Weber	October 6, 2022
40	8	"The Return"	Trey Haley	Carl Weber	October 13, 2022
41	9	"Seeing Things"	Trey Haley	Carl Weber	October 20, 2022
42	10	"Rise or Fall"	Trey Haley	Carl Weber	October 27, 2022

=== Season 5 (2024) ===
No. overall	No. in season	Title	Directed by	Written by	Original release date
43	1	"The Aftermath"	Trey Haley	Carl Weber	July 4, 2024
44	2	"Desperate Times, Desperate Measures"	Trey Haley	Carl Weber	July 4, 2024
45	3	"Special Delivery"	Trey Haley	Carl Weber	July 11, 2024
46	4	"Reminisce"	Trey Haley	Carl Weber	July 18, 2024
47	5	"Choices and Consequences"	Trey Haley	Carl Weber	July 25, 2024
48	6	"Crossing Boundaries"	Trey Haley	Carl Weber	August 1, 2024
49	7	"In Plain Sight"	Trey Haley	Carl Weber	August 8, 2024
50	8	"Chickens Come Home to Roost"	Trey Haley	Carl Weber	August 15, 2024
51	9	"One Step Closer"	Trey Haley	Carl Weber	August 22, 2024
52	10	"All Is Fair in Love and War"	Trey Haley	Carl Weber	August 29, 2024

=== Season 6 (2025) ===
No. overall	No. in season	Title	Directed by	Written by	Original release date
53	1	"Welcome to the Family...Not!"	Trey Haley	Carl Weber	October 23, 2025
54	2	"My Son, the Thief"	Trey Haley	Carl Weber	October 23, 2025
55	3	"Revenge Is a Dish Best Served Cold"	Trey Haley	Carl Weber	October 30, 2025
56	4	"More Than Meets the Eye"	Trey Haley	Carl Weber	November 6, 2025
57	5	"A Ring on Your Finger and Blood on Your Hands"	Trey Haley	Carl Weber	November 13, 2025
58	6	"Only a Duncan Can Kill a Duncan"	Trey Haley	Carl Weber	November 20, 2025
59	7	"This Is Going to Hurt Me More than You."	Trey Haley	Carl Weber	November 27, 2025
60	8	"One Life to Live"	Trey Haley	Carl Weber	December 4, 2025
61	9	"Duncan Down"	Trey Haley	Carl Weber	December 11, 2025
62	10	"It All Comes Down to This"	Trey Haley	Carl Weber	December 18, 2025

== Production ==
On December 19, 2019, the series was renewed for a 12-episode second season to air on the network's streaming service BET+. On December 4, 2020, the series was renewed for a third season On January 28, 2022, the series was renewed for a fourth season. In October 2023, creator Carl Weber stated that a fifth season was being worked on, until it was halted due to the Hollywood labor strikes.

== Release ==
The series premiered on November 13, 2018. The second season premiered on July 2, 2020. The third season premiered on October 14, 2021. The fourth season was originally set to premiere on July 28, 2022; but was later postponed to September 1, 2022. The fifth season premiered on July 4, 2024. The sixth season premiered on October 23, 2025.

== Spin-off ==
On January 17, 2024 it was reported that BET+ has ordered an eight-episode New Orleans-set spinoff starring Brandon T. Jackson. On March 6, 2024 Lela Rochon was cast as lead along with Ben Stephens, Pooch Hall, Quincy Brown, David Banner, Yvette Nicole Brown, Orlando Jones, Nicole Galicia, Erica Hubbard, Sarah Carter, Stan Shaw, Bern Nadette Stanis, Nayirah Teshali, Sacaiah Shaw, Jenson Atwood, AzMarie Livingston, Deric Augustine, Kayla Nicole and Nicholas Turturro round out the cast.

The series premiered on January 23, 2025.
