= Ashley & JaQuavis =

American street lit writing duo

- Born: Ashley Antoinette Snell; JaQuavis Coleman; Flint, Michigan, U.S.
- Writing career
- Years active: 2006-present
- Genre: Street lit
- Notable awards: New York Times Best Seller
- Website: www.ashleyjaquavis.com

Ashley & JaQuavis is the pseudonym of American street lit authors Ashley Antoinette and JaQuavis Coleman. They are considered the youngest African-American co-authors to place on the New York Times Best Seller list twice. Their best-known work is the Cartel series, which appeared on the list in 2009 and 2010.

== Biography ==
Ashley Antoinette Snell (b. 1985) and JaQuavis Coleman (c. 1984) were both born in Flint, Michigan. Coleman was raised in foster homes after being removed from his mother's home at age eight and eventually graduated from Flint Central High School; Antoinette graduated from Hamady High School. Coleman began selling cocaine at age 12. The couple met following an attempted drug bust, during which Coleman, then 16, realized he was selling to an undercover cop. He fled, eventually throwing the drugs into a bush off an alleyway. When the cops caught up with him, they were unable to locate the drugs in the bushes or on his person and were forced to let him go. Within days, Antoinette got in contact with Coleman to tell him she had seen him running from her window and dug the drugs out of the bushes to hide in her basement before the cops caught up. They were both avid readers and became close very quickly. Antoinette was pregnant within a year and the two moved in together while still attending high school. In the second month of pregnancy, Antoinette was forced to end what had become an ectopic pregnancy, which sent Antoinette into a deep depression. One day, Coleman told her: "I bet I could write a better book than you." Antoinette, who was very competitive, agreed; within days, they combined their works into Dirty Money, their first novel. The pair attended Ferris State University for two semesters, during which Coleman continued to sell cocaine in Flint.

== Career ==
At 18, they landed their first publishing deal by selling the Dirty Money manuscript to Carl Weber's Kensington Publishing imprint, which focused on street lit. In her excitement, Antoinette flushed the rest of Coleman's cocaine stash, which he claims was worth $40,000, despite their advance being for only $4,000. They dropped out of Ferris State and moved to New York to pursue writing. Antoinette and Coleman's books are based primarily by their lives in impoverished Flint, Michigan. They initially sold free advance copies they received from their publisher from the trunk of their car but quickly became prolific authors in the street lit genre, publishing four or five books annually. By 2009, their book Tale of the Murda Mamas, the second installment of their Cartel series, appeared on the New York Times Best Seller list.

In 2012, Diamonds Are Forever, Cartel book four, was also featured on the New York Times Best Seller list, and Coleman and Antonette were recognized as #27 of Ebony's Power 100, a list that also featured the Obamas, Oprah, Beyoncé and Jay-Z, and Trayvon Martin. They were nominated separately for Street Lit Writer of the Year by the African Americans on the Move Book Club (AAMBC); JaQuavis was also nominated for Male Author of the Year. In 2013, they started their own company, the Official Writers League, which publishes authors such as Keishar Tyree, C.N. Phillips, and Amaleka McCall. Antoinette signed a contract with Viacom to write several novelas about the main characters from the show Single Ladies on VH1. She was also nominated as the Female Author of the Year by the AAMBC. Antoinette received two more nominations by the AAMBC in 2014 (Reader's Choice Awards) and 2016 (Street Lit Writer of the Year).

The pair was awarded with the Urban Classic Honor at the 2018 AAMBC Awards; the following year, Antoinette's Ethic series was named the Best Black Book Series and she was named Author Queen of the Year by Black Girls Who Write (BGWW), while Coleman was named Author King of the Year. In 2020, Antoinette won her first AAMBC awards: Urban Book of the Year for the sixth installment of her Ethics series and Street Lit Writer of the Year. She and Coleman were awarded the Best Black Collaborative Series by BGWW. Antoinette and the couple's 10-year old son Quaye co-wrote The Girl Behind the Wall, published in 2020 by Ashley Antoinette Inc.

Many of their books, including Kiss Kiss, Bang Bang, Diamonds Are Forever, and The Demise, are banned in American prisons for being sexually explicit or for having criminal activity.

=== Film ===
In addition to writing, JaQuavis is also a film producer and director. In 2012, he directed Hard 6ix, based on their novel Kiss Kiss, Bang Bang, and starring Tone Trump, Ashley Antoinette, and Tiffany Marshall. In 2013, he directed 1000's "Life of a DopeBoy" music video and worked production on a film with Sean Lott. He was also working with HBO on the pilot of a television show. In 2015, he wrote and directed White House: The Movie based on his novel The White House. In 2021, Coleman worked as executive producer, writer, and director of the film Everything is Both, co-produced by Ekpe Udoh and starring Barton Fitzpatrick, Stakiah Washington, and Jason Mitchell. The film is based on a short story by Coleman.

Antoinette and Coleman signed Cartel film rights over to Cash Money Content in 2012. Coleman also signed deals with Warner Bros and NBC Universal for television development.

== Personal life ==
Their son Quaye was born in 2010. In 2011, they were living in Manhattan, New York City; by 2015, the family lived in a four-bedroom home north of Detroit.

== Bibliography ==
=== Ashley and JaQuavis ===
Year	Title	Series	Publisher	Awards	Refs
2006	Dirty Money	Dirty Money book 1	Urban Books		
2006	Diary of a Street Diva	Dirty Money book 2	Urban Books		
2007	Supreme Clientele	Dirty Money book 3	Urban Books		
2008	The Trophy Wife		Urban Books		
2008	Girls from Da Hood 4 (with Ayana Ellis)	Girls from Da Hood book 4	Urban Books		
2009	The Cartel	Cartel book 1	Urban Books		
2009	Tale of the Murda Mamas	Cartel book 2	Urban Books	2009 New York Times Best Seller; 2010 Street Literature Book (adult fiction)	
2010	Flexin & Sexin Volume 2	Flexin & Sexin anthology book 2	Life Changing Books/Power Play Media		
2010	The Last Chapter	Cartel book 3	Urban Books	2010 New York Times Best Seller	
2010	Kiss Kiss, Bang Bang		Urban Books		
2011	Murderville	Murderville book 1	Cash Money Content	2012 Street Literature Book honoree (adult fiction)	
2011	Crown		Urban Books		
2011	Soft: Cocaine Love Stories		Urban Books		
2012	The Epidemic	Murderville book 2	Cash Money Content		
2012	Black Friday: Exposed		Urban Books		
2012	Diamonds are Forever	Cartel book 4	Urban Books	2012 New York Times Best Seller; 2013 African Americans on the Move Book Club Street Urban Book of the Year nominee	
2012	Carter Diamond	Cartel prequel, book 1	Urban Audiobooks		
2013	Carter Diamond 2	Cartel prequel, book 2	Urban Audiobooks		
2013	Moving Weight		Urban Audiobooks		
2013	The Black Dahlia	Murderville book 3	Cash Money Content	2014 Street Literature Book Award Medal honoree (adult fiction)	
2013	Murder Mamas		Urban Books		
2013	The Beginning	Circle book 1	Blackstone Audio		
2014	Empire: A Street Novel		Blackstone Audio		
2014	La Bella Mafia	Cartel book 5	Urban Books		
2015	Carter Diamond 3	Cartel prequel, book 3			
2016	The Demise	Cartel book 6	St. Martin's Griffin		
2017	Illuminati: Roundtable of the Bosses	Cartel book 7	St. Martin's Griffin		
2020	The Confessional (audio short)		Brilliance Audio		
2020	Money Devils 1	Cartel book 8	St. Martin's Griffin		
2020	Long Live the Cartel	Cartel book 10	Independently published		
2023	Money Devils 2	Cartel book 9	St. Martin's Griffin		

=== JaQuavis Coleman ===
Year	Title	Series	Publisher	Awards	Refs
2009	The Dopeman's Wife	The Dopeman book 1	Urban Books		
2010	The Dopefiend	The Dopeman book 2	Urban Books		
2010	The Dopeman: Memoirs of a Snitch	The Dopeman book 3	Urban Books		
2012	The Day the Streets Stood Still		Urban Books		
2014	The White House		Akashic Books		
2017	The Streets Have No King	The Streets Have No King book 1	St. Martin's Griffin	2018 African Americans on the Move Book Club Street Lit Writer of the Year nominee	
2019	The Streets Have No Queen	The Streets Have No King book 2	Urban Books		
2019	Cubana		Urban Books		
2022	The Stiletto Agreement		St. Martin's Griffin		

=== Ashley Antoinette ===
Year	Title	Series	Publisher	Awards	Refs
2009	The Prada Plan	Prada Plan book 1	Urban Books		
2010	Moth to a Flame		Urban Books		
2010	The Prada Plan 2: Leah's Story	Prada Plan book 2	Urban Books		
2011	The Prada Plan 3: Green-Eyed Monster	Prada Plan book 3	Urban Books	2014 Street Literature Book honoree (adult fiction)	
2011	Girls from Da Hood 6 (with Amaleka McCall)	Girls from Da Hood book 6	Urban Books		
2012	Guilty Gucci		Urban Books	2013 African Americans on the Move Book Club Female Author of the Year nominee	
2013	April: No Sex in the City	Single Ladies book 1	VH1 Books		
2013	Raquel: Trois	Single Ladies book 2	VH1 Books		
2013	Keisha: A Couple of Favors	Single Ladies book 3	VH1 Books		
2014	The Prada Plan 4: Love and War	Prada Plan book 4	Urban Books		
2014	Love Burn	Love Burn book 1	Ashley Antoinette Inc.		
2015	Love Burn 2	Love Burn book 2	Ashley Antoinette Inc.		
2015	Love Burn 3	Love Burn book 3	Official Writers League		
2015	Luxe	Luxe book 1	St. Martin's Griffin		
2016	Love Burn 4	Love Burn book 4	Independently published		
2016	Luxe Two: A LaLa Land Addiction	Luxe book 2	St. Martin's Griffin		
2017	The Prada Plan 5	Prada Plan book 5	St. Martin's Griffin		
2018	Ethic	Ethic book 1	Ashley Antoinette Inc.	2019 African Americans on the Move Book Club eBook of the Year nominee	
2018	Ethic 2	Ethic book 2	Ashley Antoinette Inc.		
2018	Ethic 3	Ethic book 3	Ashley Antoinette Inc.		
2019	Christmas with the Okafors	Ethic tie-in	Ashley Antoinette Inc.		
2019	Ethic 4	Ethic book 4	Ashley Antoinette Inc.		
2019	Ethic 5	Ethic book 5	Ashley Antoinette Inc.		
2019	Ethic 6	Ethic book 6	Ashley Antoinette Inc.	2020 African Americans on the Move Book Club Urban Book of the Year winner	
2020	Butterfly	Butterfly book 1	St. Martin's Griffin	2021 African Americans on the Move Book Club Urban Book of the Year nominee; USA Today bestseller	
2020	Butterfly 2	Butterfly book 2	St. Martin's Griffin		
2020	Butterfly 3	Butterfly book 3	St. Martin's Griffin	2020 Black Girls Who Write Best Black Urban Romance	
2020	The Invitation: An Ethic Holiday Edition	Ethic tie-in	Ashley Antoinette Inc.		
2020	The Girl Behind the Wall (with Quaye Coleman)		Ashley Antoinette Inc.		
2022	Butterfly 4	Butterfly book 4	St. Martin's Griffin		
