= The Family Business: New Orleans =

- Genre: Crime drama; Action; Romance; Thriller
- Created by: Carl Weber
- Showrunners: Nikaya Brown Jones & Carl Weber
- Written by: Carl Weber
- Directed by: Trey Haley
- Starring: Brandon T. Jackson; Lela Rochon; Ben Stephens; Pooch Hall; Quincy Brown; Nichole Galicia; Sarah Carter; Erica Hubbard; Yvette Nicole Brown; Stan Shaw; Monica Davis; Nichole Galicia; David Banner
- Country of origin: United States
- Original language: English
- No. of seasons: 1
- No. of episodes: 8

Production
- Executive producers: Carl Weber; Nikaya D. Brown Jones; Trey Haley
- Producers: Brandon T. Jackson; Lela Rochon; Dondi M. Jones; Ben Stephens; Veronica Nichols; Gregory Ramon Anderson; Quincy Brown; Neyairah Teshali; Pooch Hall; Erica Hubbard; Nichole Galicia; Monica Davis
- Editor: MJ Whitaker
- Production companies: Tri Destined Studios; Urban Books Media

Original release
- Network: BET+
- Release: January 23 – March 6, 2025

Related
- The Family Business

The Family Business: New Orleans is an American crime family drama series created by Carl Weber and stars Lela Rochon as Big Shirley Duncan, owner of popular New Orleans club Midnight Blues, and Brandon T. Jackson as her son Marquis. It is a spin-off from the crime drama The Family Business. The eight-episode first season premiered on January 23, 2025 on BET+.

== Cast and characters ==
=== Main cast ===
- Brandon T. Jackson as Marquis Duncan
- Lela Rochon as Big Shirley Duncan
- Ben Stephens as Curtis Duncan
- Pooch Hall as Floyd
- Quincy Brown as Prince
- Nichole Galicia as Marie LeBlanc
- Sarah Carter as Sheriff Clay
- Erica Hubbard as Ernestine
- Yvette Nicole Brown as Monique
- Stan Shaw as Larry Duncan
- Monica Davis as Antoinette
- David Banner as Jean LeBlanc

=== Recurring cast ===
- Orlando Jones as Gabriel
- Bern Nadette Stanis as Nee Nee Duncan
- Stan Shaw as Larry Duncan
- Nayirah Teshali as Lauren Duncan
- Sacaiah Shaw as Kenny Duncan
- Jenson Atwood as Saint
- AzMarie Livingston as Kendal
- Deric Augustine as Jace
- Kayla Nicole
- Nicholas Turturro
- Erica Joy as Holly
- Rayan Lawrence as Pierre Leblanc

Some of The Family Business regulars set to appear in guest-starring roles, including Michael Jai White as Vegas Duncan and Denise Boutte as Raven Sinclair. Several cast members, including Stephens, Stanis, Stan Shaw, Teshali and Sacaiha Shaw, have made guest appearances in The Family Business' fourth season.

== Production ==
On January 17, 2024, it was reported that BET+ ordered an eight-episode spin-off for their crime drama series The Family Business. The series set in New Orleans and follows Duncan family led by Big Shirley Duncan. The series executive produced by Carl Weber, ND Brown (who services as showrunner), and Trey Haley. The same time Brandon T. Jackson was announced as male lead. On March 6, 2024, it was announced that Lela Rochon was cast as Big Shirley, while Ben Stephens, Pooch Hall, Quincy Brown, David Banner, Yvette Nicole Brown, Orlando Jones, Nichole Galicia, Erica Hubbard, Sarah Carter, Stan Shaw, Bern Nadette Stanis, Nayirah Teshali, Sacaiah Shaw, Jensen Atwood, AzMarie Livingston, Deric Augustine. Kayla Nicole and Nicholas Turturro were cast as regulars. Rochon and Jackson served as associate producers.

Principal photography began in New Orleans and Los Angeles, California in March, 2024.

== Episodes ==
No.	Title	Directed by	Written by	Original release date
1	"Surprise, Surpise"	Trey Haley	Carl Weber & C.N. Phillips	January 23, 2025
2	"Rest No Peace"	Trey Haley	Carl Weber & C.N. Phillips	January 23, 2025
3	"Mask On"	Trey Haley	Carl Weber	January 30, 2025
4	"Truth, Lies, & Secret Ties"	Veronica Nichols	Carl Weber	February 6, 2025
5	"The Hunt Is On"	Trey Haley	Carl Weber	February 13, 2025
6	"Two Sides to a Story"	Trey Haley	Carl Weber	February 20, 2025
7	"Things Come to a Head"	Trey Haley	Carl Weber	February 27, 2025
8	"Burn, Nola, Burn"	Trey Haley	Carl Weber	March 6, 2025

== Release ==
The series premiered on January 23, 2025.
