= Love Don't Cost a Thing =

Love Don't Cost a Thing may refer to:

- "Love Don't Cost a Thing" (song), a 2000 song by Jennifer Lopez.
- Love Don't Cost a Thing (film), a 2003 film starring Nick Cannon and Christina Milian.
