= Practically Perfect =

Practically Perfect may refer to:

- "Practically Perfect", a song by the Sherman Brothers, basis of the song Sister Suffragette
- Practically Perfect (Dexter), an episode of the American television series Dexter
