= Robert Desiderio =

American actor

- Born: September 9, 1951 (age 74); New York City, NY, U.S.
- Education: Seton Hall University
- Years active: 1980–present
- Spouse: Judith Light (m. 1985)

Robert Desiderio (born September 9, 1951) is an American actor best known for his roles on television. He starred as Steve Piermont in the ABC daytime soap opera One Life to Live (1982–83) opposite his future wife, Judith Light. He starred in the HBO drama series, Maximum Security (1984–85), the ABC crime drama Heart of the City (1986–87), and from 1988 to 1989 played Ted Melcher in the CBS prime time soap opera, Knots Landing.

== Career ==
Desiderio first came to prominence in soap operas, appearing in daytime dramas such as Search for Tomorrow (1979–80), Ryan's Hope (1982) and One Life to Live (1982–83). In 1986–1987, he starred in the ABC primetime drama series Heart of the City. From 1988 to 1989 he had the recurring role of Ted Melcher in the CBS primetime soap opera, Knots Landing. He received Soap Opera Digest Awards nomination for Outstanding Villain: Prime Time.

Desiderio also had recurring roles on MacGruder and Loud, Cheers and The Sopranos, and guest-starred in The A-Team; Remington Steele; The Fall Guy; Matlock; Family Ties; Murder, She Wrote; Murphy Brown and Ugly Betty. He appeared in a number of made for television movies, include The Princess and the Cabbie and Once You Meet a Stranger. His feature film credits including Oh, God! You Devil (1984) and Gross Anatomy (1989). In 1996, he appeared alongside his wife in the documentary Paul Monette: The Brink of Summer's End.

Desiderio co-wrote the 2007 film Save Me starring Chad Allen and his wife Judith Light.

== Personal life ==
Desiderio was born in The Bronx, the son of Mary (née Demattia) and Anthony J. Desiderio. He and actress Judith Light married in 1985. They have no children.
