= The Black Hamptons =

American drama television series

- Also known as: Carl Weber's The Black Hamptons
- Genre: Drama; Crime drama Romance; Thriller
- Created by: Carl Weber
- Written by: Carl Weber
- Directed by: Trey Haley
- Starring: Lamman Rucker; Vanessa Bell Calloway; Elise Neal; Brian J. White; Karon Riley; Mike Merrill; Blac Chyna; Aaron D. Spears; Daya Vaidya; Cameo Sherrell; Franklin Ojeda Smith; Jordan Austin Smith; Jennifer Freeman; David Andrews; RonReaco Lee; Blue Kimble; Richard Lawson
- Country of origin: United States
- Original language: English
- No. of seasons: 2
- No. of episodes: 12

Production
- Executive producers: Nikaya D. Brown Jones; Carl Weber; Trey Haley; Ben Stephens
- Camera setup: Multiple camera
- Production companies: Tri Destined Studios; Urban Books Media

Original release
- Network: BET+
- Release: August 25, 2022 – January 18, 2024
- Network: Paramount+

The Black Hamptons is an American drama television series created by Carl Weber and based on his novel of the same name. The series revolved around feuding New York families, the Brittons and the Johnsons. The show features an ensemble cast led by Lamman Rucker, Vanessa Bell Calloway and Elise Neal. It premiered on BET+ on August 25, 2022. On September 29, 2023, the series was renewed for a second season which premiered on December 7, 2023.

== Premise ==
The Black Hamptons debuted as a four-part miniseries and was based on the novel by Carl Weber. It's set in Sag Harbor, New York, a village also referred to as The Black Hamptons and focuses on two rich families, the Brittons and the Johnsons.

== Cast and characters ==
- Lamman Rucker as Anthony Johnson
- Vanessa Bell Calloway as Carolyn Britton
- Elise Neal as Sydney Johnson
- Brian J. White as Jeffery Bowen
- Karon Riley as Malcom Britton
- Mike Merrill as Martin Britton
- Blac Chyna as Karrin
- Aaron D. Spears as Sergeant Lane
- Daya Vaidya as Vanessa Britton
- Cameo Sherrell as Leslie Bowen
- Franklin Ojeda Smith as Rev. Chauncey Taylor
- Jordan Austin Smith as Jesse Britton
- Jennifer Freeman as Kimberly
- Moritz J. Williams as Peter Lane
- RonReaco Lee as Bobby Boyd (season 2)
- Blue Kimble as Christopher (season 2)
- Richard Lawson as Moses Britton (season 2)

== Episodes ==
Season	Episodes	Originally released		
Season	Episodes	First released	Last released	Network
1	4	August 25, 2022	September 1, 2022	BET+
2	8	December 7, 2023	January 18, 2024	BET+

=== Season 1 (2022) ===
No. overall	No. in season	Title	Directed by	Written by	Original release date
1	1	"Open Season"	Trey Haley	Carl Weber	August 25, 2022
2	2	"The Slickest Player in the Game"	Trey Haley	Carl Weber	August 25, 2022
3	3	"Legacies and Lies"	Trey Haley	Carl Weber	September 1, 2022
4	4	"Winners Win"	Trey Haley	Carl Weber	September 1, 2022

=== Season 2 (2023–24) ===
No. overall	No. in season	Title	Directed by	Written by	Original release date
5	1	"Picture Perfect"	Trey Haley	Carl Weber	December 7, 2023
6	2	"Trouble in Paradise"	Trey Haley	Carl Weber	December 7, 2023
7	3	"Life's a Beach"	Trey Haley	Carl Weber	December 14, 2023
8	4	"Summer Soiree"	Trey Haley	Carl Weber	December 21, 2023
9	5	"Hot and Heavy"	Trey Haley	Carl Weber	December 28, 2023
10	6	"Pay the Cost"	Trey Haley	Carl Weber	January 4, 2024
11	7	"Gentrification"	Trey Haley	Carl Weber	January 11, 2024
12	8	"Keep the Black Hamptons Black"	Trey Haley	Carl Weber	January 18, 2024

== Production ==
=== Development ===
The series was picked up by BET on March 10, 2022. On May 25, 2022, the series moved to BET+. The series premiered on August 25, 2022.

On September 29, 2023, the series was renewed for a second season which premiered on December 7, 2023.

=== Casting ===
The main cast was revealed on March 10, 2022.
