= The Obama Effect =

- Film poster
- Directed by: Charles S. Dutton
- Written by: Charles S. Dutton; Barry Hankerson; Samuel Z. Jean; Sidra Smith; Celeste Walker
- Produced by: Barry Hankerson; Robert Johnson; Ifeanyi Njoku; Harry Smith
- Starring: Charles S. Dutton; Katt Williams; Vanessa Bell Calloway
- Cinematography: Daniel Pearl
- Edited by: Sean Hubbert
- Music by: Rick Stone
- Release date: July 13, 2012
- Running time: 85 minutes
- Country: United States
- Language: English

The Obama Effect is a 2012 American comedy-drama film directed by Charles S. Dutton and starring Dutton, Katt Williams and Vanessa Bell Calloway.

== Cast ==
- Charles S. Dutton as John Thomas
- Katt Williams as "MLK"
- Vanessa Bell Calloway as Molly Thomas
- Glynn Turman as "Slim Sugar"
- Meagan Good as Tamika Jones
- John Diehl as Steve Warren
- Zab Judah as Jamel Thomas
- CJ Mac as Joshua
- Reggie Brown as Barack Obama
