= Melissa Schuman =

American singer, dancer, & actress (born 1984)

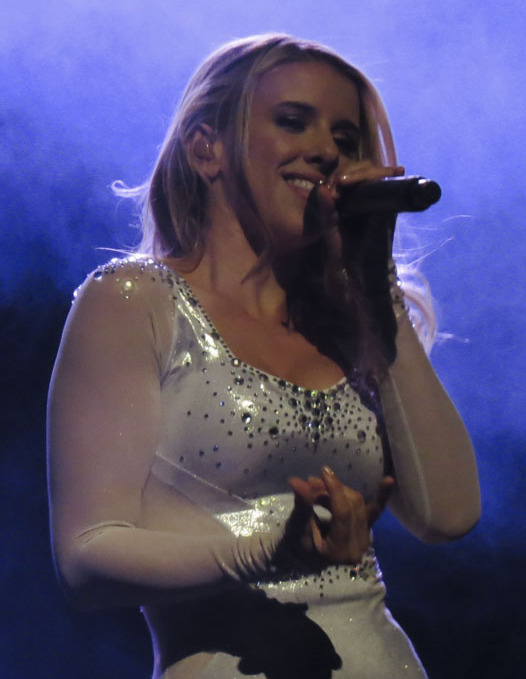
- Schuman in 2016

Background information
- Born: Melissa Amber Schuman; August 21, 1984 (age 42); San Clemente, California, U.S.
- Occupations: Singer; dancer; actress
- Years active: 1998–present
- Label: Bad Boy
- Children: 1
- Formerly of: Dream

Melissa Amber Schuman (born August 21, 1984) is an American singer and actress best known as a member of the American girl group Dream and for their platinum hit "He Loves U Not".

Schuman also gained some success in acting with appearances in films including Love Don't Cost a Thing, The Hollow, and Silent Scream. She has also appeared on The Tonight Show with Jay Leno and hosted TRL.

== Career ==
In 2002, after Schuman announced she was leaving Dream to focus on her acting career and a solo album, she appeared in Love Don't Cost a Thing and The Hollow, and starred in Silent Scream. She recorded a song with The Hollow co-star Nick Carter called "There for Me" in 2004.

She had plans to release her first single, "Don't", but the single and solo album were scrapped. However, on November 16, 2010, the single was released on iTunes.

On November 15, 2010, Schuman's previously unreleased solo album Stereotyped was released on iTunes.

=== 2008–2012: Lady Phoenix ===
On January 28, 2008, Schuman announced that she would be forming a new music group with former Dream bandmate Ashley Poole and would be auditioning for members, with plans for a reality show documenting the group’s formation.

In 2012, Schuman confirmed that Lady Phoenix had disbanded following Ashley Poole's departure from the group, and the planned reality show was not picked up by any network.

=== 2015–2016: Dream comeback ===
On May 11, 2015, the original members of Dream reunited for a mini-reunion and posted a video online performing an a cappella version of their 2000 single "He Loves U Not". The video quickly went viral, gaining over 23,000 views and receiving attention from MTV, Seventeen Magazine, and other media outlets.

On May 29, 2015, the original members of Dream announced a comeback and launched Twitter and Facebook pages. The Twitter account gained over 21,000 followers following its launch.

On December 17, 2015, Dream recorded and released a studio version of "O Holy Night" as a holiday release for fans while working on new music planned for 2016.

On July 8, 2016, Dream joined other Y2K-era acts, including O-Town, Ryan Cabrera, and 98 Degrees, on the My2K Tour, performing in 39 cities across the United States. Dream also performed at The MixTape Festival at Hershey Stadium alongside Paula Abdul, New Kids on the Block, Boyz II Men, 98 Degrees, O-Town, and Ryan Cabrera.

On August 2, 2016, Dream released their first single in 15 years, titled "I Believe", on iTunes and Spotify.

On October 5, 2016, Dream member Ashley Poole announced via Snapchat and Facebook that the group had once again disbanded and that a new album would not be released.

== Sexual assault allegation against Nick Carter ==
On November 21, 2017, Schuman claimed that she was raped by singer and Backstreet Boys member Nick Carter in 2003, an accusation Carter denied. The case filed by Schuman was dismissed by the Los Angeles District Attorney in September 2018 because the statute of limitations had passed. Schuman later filed a sexual assault lawsuit against Carter in April 2023.

In August 2024, it was revealed that Carter had countersued Schuman for $2.5 million, with the countersuit filed in Los Angeles Superior Court on July 26, 2024. Court documents stated that Schuman's lawsuit cost Carter and the Backstreet Boys endorsement and business deals, resulting in financial losses.

In May 2024, Schuman was among three female accusers who detailed sexual assault allegations against Carter in the documentary Fallen Idols. The two-part documentary aired on ID and Max on May 27–28, 2024.

== Personal life ==
Schuman married dancer Brandon Henschel on June 7, 2006, in San Diego, California.

On February 19, 2010, Schuman announced on Twitter that she and her husband were expecting their first child, a boy. The couple welcomed their son on July 18, 2010.

She is an advocate for victims of sexual abuse.

Schuman is a Christian.

== Discography ==
=== Solo ===
- Stereotyped (2002/2010)

=== Dream ===
- It Was All a Dream (2001)

== Filmography ==
1997	Tiger	Erica Baker
2002	Anna's Dream	Sheila
2003	Love Don't Cost a Thing	Zoe Parks
2003	Recipe for Disaster	Shannon Devries
2004	The Hollow	Amber
2004	Window Theory	Megan
2005	Silent Scream	Nicole
2015	Actress(es): A Web Series	Jennifer Stone
2024	Fallen Idols: Nick and Aaron Carter	Herself
