= Hyperion Bay =

American drama television series

- Genre: Drama
- Created by: Joseph Dougherty
- Starring: Mark-Paul Gosselaar; Dylan Neal; Sydney Penny; Christina Moore; Bart Johnson; Chaka Forman; Cassidy Rae; Cindy Pickett; Carmen Electra; Daya Vaidya
- Theme music composer: Hootie & the Blowfish; Richie Sambora; Richie Supa
- Opening theme: "I Will Wait" performed by Hootie & the Blowfish (episodes 3-10); "Hard Times Come Easy" performed by Richie Sambora (episodes 10-17)
- Composer: Michael Tavera
- Country of origin: United States
- Original language: English
- No. of seasons: 1
- No. of episodes: 17

Production
- Executive producers: Joseph Dougherty; Frank South
- Producers: Marlane Meyer; Lindsley Parsons III
- Running time: 45–48 minutes
- Production companies: Jarndyce & Jarndyce; South Productions; Warner Bros. Television

Original release
- Network: The WB
- Release: September 21, 1998 – March 8, 1999

Hyperion Bay is an American drama television series that ran for one season on The WB from September 21, 1998 to March 8, 1999. The series was partially filmed in Humboldt County, California, in the cities of Trinidad, Eureka, Ferndale, and Loleta.

== Synopsis ==
The series centers around Dennis Sweeny (Mark-Paul Gosselaar) who, after a successful career in the computer software business, returns home to open a local division for the company he works for. The series follows the drama when the new meets the old in the little coastal town of Hyperion Bay, California.

== Cancellation ==
According to series writer and co-producer Jeffrey Stepakoff, early into Hyperion Bay's run the network told producers to make the show more hip and with a quicker pace. When series producer and creator Joseph Dougherty refused, he was fired by Warner Bros, and former Melrose Place producer Frank South was brought in to retool the series. Carmen Electra was added to the cast as Sarah Hicks, a character modeled after Heather Locklear's character, Amanda Woodward, on Melrose Place.

The changes did not improve ratings and The WB canceled Hyperion Bay in February 1999, with the last episodes airing in March 1999.

== Cast ==
=== Main ===
- Mark-Paul Gosselaar as Dennis Sweeny
- Raymond J. Barry as Frank Sweeny
- Sydney Penny as Jennifer Worth
- Dylan Neal as Nick Sweeny
- Christina Moore as Amy Sweeny
- Bart Johnson as Nelson Tucker (episodes 1–14)
- Cassidy Rae as Trudy Tucker
- Chaka Forman as Marcus Fox (episodes 4–17)
- Carmen Electra as Sarah Hicks (episodes 10–17)

=== Recurring ===
- Cindy Pickett as Marjorie Sweeny
- Daya Vaidya as Emily

== Episodes ==
| No. | Title | Directed by | Written by | Original release date | Prod. code |
|---|---|---|---|---|---|
| 1 | "Pilot" | Joseph Dougherty & Ellen S. Pressman | Joseph Dougherty | September 21, 1998 | 225101 |
| 2 | "The Cookie Crumbles" | Perry Lang | Joseph Dougherty | September 28, 1998 | 225102 |
| 3 | "Static" | Nick Marck | Bernard Lechowick | October 5, 1998 | 225103 |
| 4 | "Family Business" | Bethany Rooney | Jeffrey Stepakoff | October 12, 1998 | 225104 |
| 5 | "Temptation and Responsibility" | Nick Marck | Ed Strange | October 19, 1998 | 225105 |
| 6 | "Some Common Words and Phrases" | Bethany Rooney | Wendy Goldman | October 26, 1998 | 225106 |
| 7 | "Save the Last Dance for Me" | Sharron Miller | Bernard Lechowick | November 2, 1998 | 225107 |
| 8 | "House Guests and Fish" | Michael Rhodes | Wendy Goldman | November 16, 1998 | 225108 |
| 9 | "The Rope" | Sharron Miller | Jeffrey Stepakoff | November 23, 1998 | 225109 |
| 10 | "Young and on Fire" | Bethany Rooney | Frank South | January 25, 1999 | 225110 |
| 11 | "Truth or Consequences" | Michael Ray Rhodes | Bernard Lechowick | January 27, 1999 | 225111 |
| 12 | "The Takeover" | Jefferson Kibbee | Wendy Goldman & Jeffrey Stepakoff | February 1, 1999 | 225112 |
| 13 | "Strange Days" | Stephen Cragg | Kris Dobkin | February 8, 1999 | 225113 |
| 14 | "Valentine's Bay" | Bethany Rooney | Frank South | February 15, 1999 | 225114 |
| 15 | "With Friends Like These..." | Jefferson Kibbee | Bernard Lechowick | February 22, 1999 | 225115 |
| 16 | "A Matter of Trust" | Unknown | Unknown | March 1, 1999 | 225116 |
| 17 | "The Weight of the World" | Unknown | Unknown | March 8, 1999 | 225117 |

== Awards and nominations ==
| Year | Award | Category | Recipient | Result |
|---|---|---|---|---|
| 1999 | Young Artist Award | Best Performance in a TV Drama Series – Guest Starring Young Actress | Olivia Marsico | Nominated |
