= Nichole Galicia =

Panamanian actress (born 1975)

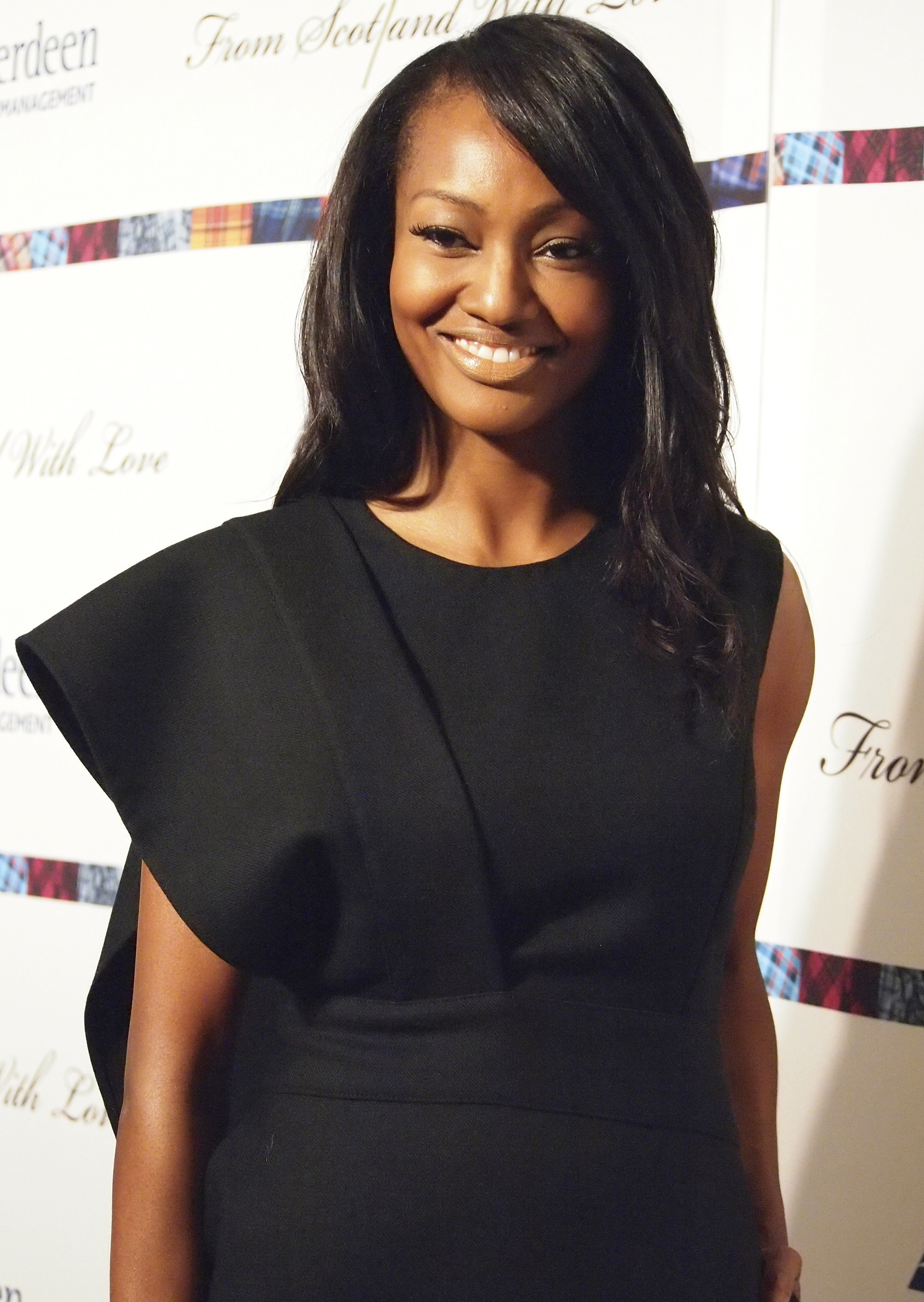
- Galicia in 2013
- Born: Nichole Mercedes Robinson; 1975 (age 50–51); Panama
- Occupations: Actress, model
- Years active: 1996–present
- Website: Nichole Galicia on Instagram

Nichole Galicia (born 1975) is a Panamanian actress and model.

== Life and career ==
Galicia was born as Nichole Mercedes Robinson in Panama, and began her career as a fashion model in Madrid at the age of 13.‍ She later moved to New York City and worked as a commercial model for Pepsi and Gap, and appeared in Elle and Vogue.‍ In 2003, she made her acting debut playing a supporting role in the comedy film Love Don't Cost a Thing. She later appeared in films Torque (2004) and Dirty (2005). From 2004 to 2006, she had a recurring role in the Showtime drama series Huff.‍

In 2012, Galicia played the supporting role of Sheba in the Western film Django Unchained, written and directed by Quentin Tarantino.‍ Galicia first met Tarantino when she auditioned for the part of a cheerleader in his 2007 film Death Proof.‍ She later starred in the Jamie Foxx-directed short film ...And She Was My Eve, and co-starred opposite Tyson Beckford in the drama film Supermodel.‍ In 2015, she was a regular cast member during the third and final season of the Syfy science fiction Western series, Defiance.‍ In 2018, Tarantino cast her in his Once Upon a Time in Hollywood, but her scenes were cut.‍

In 2021, Galicia was cast in the Paramount+ crime drama series Mayor of Kingstown, produced by Taylor Sheridan.‍ She also guest-starred in Sheridan's series Yellowstone and its prequel, 1883.‍ In 2024, Galicia was cast in the BET+ crime drama series, The Family Business: New Orleans.‍

== Filmography ==
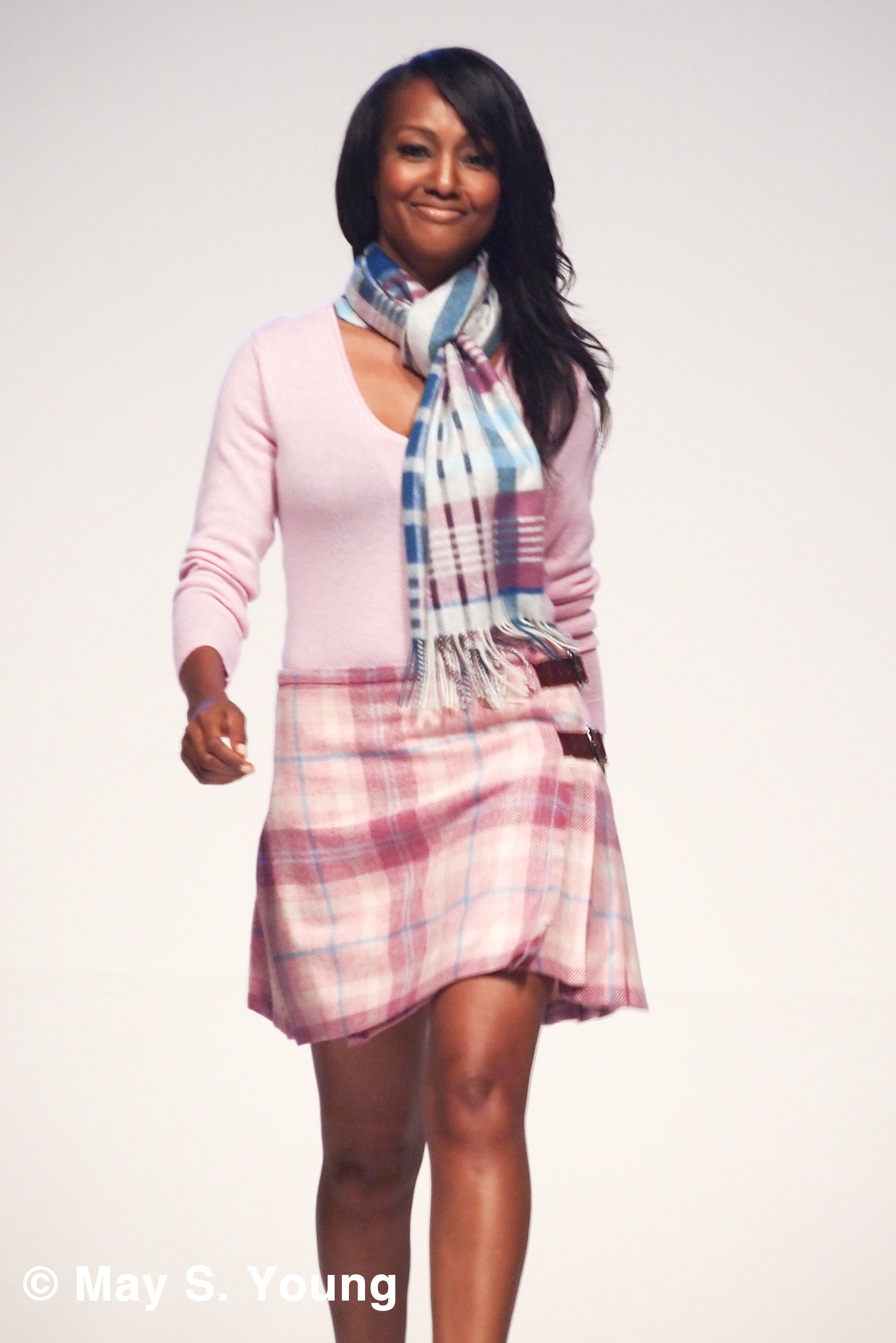
Galicia in 2013

=== Film ===
Year	Title	Role	Notes
1999	Any Given Sunday	Party Girl	
2003	Love Don't Cost a Thing	Yvonne Freeman	
2004	Torque	Mikisha	
2005	The Marriage Counselor	Debra	Short film
2005	Dirty	Boom Boom	
2009	Silver Street		Short film
2012	Django Unchained	Sheba	
2013	And She Was My Eve	The Bride	
2014	Wish I Was Here	Juliet	
2015	Supermodel	Amanda	
2021	Shimmer	Dr. Thea Kait	
2024	Mindwash		Producer‍

=== Television ===
Year	Title	Role	Notes
1996	Psychic Detectives	Vendor	UPN TV pilot
2004–2006	Huff	Pepper	8 episodes
2009	CSI: NY	Kara Garland	Episode: "Help"
2015	Defiance	Kindzi	11 episodes
2017	Romance at Reindeer Lodge	Kayla	Television film
2018	The Perfect One	Roz	Television film
2021	1883	Guinevere	Episode: "1983"
2021–2022	Yellowstone	Charlotte Riley	Episodes: "No Such Thing as Fair" and "Grass on the Streets and Weeds on the Rooftops"
2021–present	Mayor of Kingstown	Rebecca	20 episodes
2025	The Family Business: New Orleans	Marie LeBlanc	
