= Stan Shaw =

American actor (born 1952)

- Born: July 14, 1952 (age 74); Chicago, Illinois, U.S.
- Occupation: Actor
- Years active: 1970–present

Stan Shaw (born July 14, 1952) is an American actor. He began his career performing on Broadway musicals Hair and Via Galactica, before making his feature film debut appearing in Truck Turner (1974). Shaw later appeared in films such as: The Bingo Long Traveling All-Stars & Motor Kings (1976), Rocky (1976), The Boys in Company C (1978), The Great Santini (1979), Runaway (1984), The Monster Squad (1987), Harlem Nights (1989), Fried Green Tomatoes (1991), Rising Sun (1993), Cutthroat Island (1995), Daylight (1996) and Snake Eyes (1998).

== Early life ==
Born in Chicago, Illinois, he is the son of Bertha Shaw and saxophonist Eddie Shaw, and cousin of the late soul singers Sam Cooke and Tyrone Davis. His brother is Vaan Shaw, a guitarist also known as Eddie Shaw Jr. Stan Shaw (42) was married to Dr. Zoe Shaw (19) in 1996, who is an author and psychotherapist. They divorced in 2023.

== Career ==
Shaw started his acting career in the Chicago production of the musical Hair as well as the Broadway production of The Me Nobody Knows. He starred in the Broadway rock musical Via Galactica directed by Peter Hall in 1972. Before becoming an actor, Shaw was a karate, judo, and jujutsu instructor in Chicago. He holds first dan black belt in judo and jujutsu and a second dan in karate. He made his big screen debut appearing in the blaxploitation films Truck Turner and TNT Jackson, both released in 1974. The following year he appeared in the musical film Darktown Strutters.

In 1976, Shaw starred in the sports comedy film The Bingo Long Traveling All-Stars & Motor Kings as Joseph Vanderbilt "Esquire Joe" Calloway alongside Billy Dee Williams, James Earl Jones and Richard Pryor. Later that year, Shaw appeared in the sports drama Rocky (1976) as "Big Dipper" Brown, a rival boxer who taunts Rocky after being given his locker. In 1978 he went to star in the war drama film, The Boys in Company C about United States Marine Corps recruits preparing for duty and their subsequent combat in the Vietnam War. In 1979 he had a supporting role in the drama film The Great Santini. Later in 1979, Shaw starred as Alex Haley's maternal grandfather Will Palmer in the television miniseries Roots: The Next Generations. In his 1979 interview to The New York Times, shortly after having been offered a role in a situation comedy, Shaw said, “I've turned the sitcom down. I think I'm worthy of better things. People have choices, and careers are made up of what you choose and turn down. It's a career for me, and I'm looking for something that's going to make me last."

Shaw starred in a number of television pilots, notable 1979 NBC Western Buffalo Soldiers about black cavalry corps known as the Buffalo Soldiers, who protected the Western territories after the end of the Civil War. From 1983 to 1984 he starred in the CBS legal drama series, The Mississippi. In 1984 he starred in the HBO prison drama series, Maximum Security. The following year he starred in Displaced Person, an episode of anthology series, American Playhouse. In 1986 he co-starred opposite Cicely Tyson and Martin Sheen in the made-for-television movie Samaritan: The Mitch Snyder Story and in 1987 starred in the controversial miniseries Billionaire Boys Club. He also made appearances in television series Hill Street Blues, Fame, The Young Riders, Wiseguy and Murder, She Wrote. He also appeared as Isaac in the 1994 miniseries North and South. He received NAACP Theatre Awards for performance in Samm-Art Williams' play Home.

Shaw played a professional fighters in films Tough Enough (1983), Busted Up (1986), Harlem Nights (1989), and Snake Eyes (1998). He also appeared in films Runaway (1984), The Monster Squad (1987), Body of Evidence (1993) and Rising Sun (1993). In 1991, Shaw appeared in the comedy-drama film Fried Green Tomatoes. He had a role in the 1995 comedy film Houseguest, alongside Sinbad, and appeared as a pirate in Cutthroat Island (1995) with Geena Davis. He appeared as George Tyrell in the 1996 disaster film Daylight and as Archie Mullen in the television film Freedom Song (2000).

In 2000s and early 2010s, Shaw left the screen, making only selected appearances in television series The X Files and CSI: Crime Scene Investigation. In 2017 he made his big screen return starring in the horror film Jeepers Creepers 3. In 2019 he guest-starred in the Kristoff St. John's funeral episode of CBS soap opera The Young and the Restless. In 2020 he appeared in the horror film The Pale Door. In 2022 he joined the cast of BET+ drama series, The Family Business playing Larry Duncan. In 2024 he was cast in its spin-off series, The Family Business: New Orleans. In 2023 he had a recurring role in the NBC medical drama series, Chicago Med.

== Filmography ==
Television and film roles

Year	Title	Role	Notes	Ref
1974	Truck Turner	Fontana	Feature film	
1974	TNT Jackson	Charlie	Feature film	
1975	Darktown Strutters	Raunchy	Feature film	
1976	The Bingo Long Traveling All-Stars & Motor Kings	Esquirre Joe Callaway, All-Star (CF)	Feature film	
1976	Street Killing	Mitchell Small	Television film	
1976	Rocky	Dipper	Feature film	
1976	Arthur Hailey's the Moneychangers	John Dinkerwell	Miniseries, 4 episodes	
1977	Starsky & Hutch	Leotis	TV series, 1 episode	
1977	Future Cop	Ollie Dawnson	TV series, 1 episode	
1978	Lucan	Caldwell	TV series, 1 episode	
1978	The Boys in Company C	Tyrone Washington	Feature film	
1979	Roots: The Next Generations	Will Palmer	Miniseries, 4 episodes	
1979	Buffalo Soldiers	Sgt. Joshua Haywood	Television film	
1979	The Great Santini	Toomer Smalls	Feature film	
1980	Another Story	Carl	Television film	
1982	Darkroom	Dan Burroughs	TV series, 1 episode	
1983	Matt Houston	Bubba Dax	TV series, 1 episode	
1983	Tough Enough	P.T. Coolidge	Feature film	
1983	Venice Medical		Television pilot	
1983	CBS Children's Mystery Theatre	Vince	TV series, 1 episode	
1983–1984	The Mississippi	Lafayette "Lafe" Tate	TV series, 23 episodes	
1984	Runaway	Marvin	Feature film	
1984	Maximum Security	Papa Jack, Prisoner and Papa Dock	TV series, 4 episodes	
1984–1985	Call to Glory	Jonesy	TV series, 2 episodes	
1985	American Playhouse	Sergeant	TV series, 1 episode	
1985	When Dreams Come True	Harry Jenks	Television film	
1985	Hill Street Blues	Louis Russ	TV series, 2 episodes	
1985; 1994	Murder, She Wrote	Det. Sgt. Vince Lofton and Eddie Walters	TV series, 3 episodes	
1986	Fame	Jim	TV series, 1 episode	
1986	The Gladiator	Joe Barker	Television film	
1986	Under Siege	Nick Tutman	Television film	
1986	Samaritan: The Mitch Snyder Story	Harold Moss	Television film	
1986	Busted Up	Angie	Feature film	
1987	The Monster Squad	Detective Sapir	Feature film	
1987	Billionaire Boys Club	Frank Booker	Miniseries, 2 episodes	
1987	The Three Kings	Paul	Television film	
1988	Red River	Jack Byrd	Television film	
1989	The Young Riders	Ulysses	TV series, 1 episode	
1989	Harlem Nights	Jack Jenkins	Feature film	
1989	Wiseguy	Major Vernon Biggs	TV series, 4 episodes	
1990	Fear	Detective Webber	Television film	
1990	The Court-Martial of Jackie Robinson	Joe Louis	Television film	
1990	Midnight Caller	Luther Krock	TV series, 2 episodes	
1991	Fried Green Tomatoes	Big George	Feature film	
1992	L.A. Law	Terry Slueman	TV series, 3 episodes	
1992	Body of Evidence	Charles Biggs	Feature film	
1993	When Love Kills: The Seduction of John Hearn	Gerst	Television film	
1993	Lifepod	Parker	Television film	
1993	Rising Sun	Phillips	Feature film	
1993	Matlock	Cyrus Jordan	TV series, 1 episode	
1994	Heaven And Hell: North And South Book III	Isaac	Miniseries, 3 episodes	
1995	Houseguest	Larry	Feature film	
1995	Cutthroat Island	Mr. Glasspoole	Feature film	
1996	Daylight	George Tyrell	Feature film	
1998	Snake Eyes	Lincoln Tyler	Feature film	
1998	Rag and Bone	Det. Richie	Television film	
2000	Early Edition	Earl Camby	TV series, 1 episode	
2000	Freedom Song	Archie Mullen	Television film	
2002	The X-Files	Stephen Murdoch	TV series, 1 episode	
2003	Detonator	Robert Brickland	Feature film	
2009	CSI: Crime Scene Investigation	Geoff Johnson	TV series, 1 episode	
2016	Cassidy Way	Mr. Kane	Feature film	
2016	Code Black	Oscar Terzian	TV series, 1 episode	
2016	Criminal Minds	Albert Lewis	TV series, 1 episode	
2017	Jeepers Creepers 3	Sheriff Dan Tashtego	Feature film	
2018	Drive Me to Vegas and Mars	Cowboy	Feature film	
2019	The Young and the Restless	Reverend	Soap Opera, 1 episode	
2019	Winter Song	Fred	Feature film	
2020	The Pale Door	Lester	Feature film	
2021	Greyson Family Christmas	Dr. Greyson	Feature film	
2022–2024	The Family Business	Larry Duncan	TV series, 11 episodes	
2022	A Christmas Prayer	Deacon Williams	Feature film	
2023	Quantum Leap	Eli Jackson	TV series, 1 episode	
2023	A Nashville Legacy	Franklin Berryhall	Television film	
2023	Chicago Med	Dr. George Thomas	TV series, 6 episodes	
2025	The Family Business: New Orleans	Larry Duncan	TV series	
