= Maximum Security (TV series) =

American drama television series

- Genre: Drama
- Starring: Robert Desiderio; Geoffrey Lewis; Jean Smart; Robert Alan Browne; Stephen Elliott
- Country of origin: United States
- Original language: English
- No. of seasons: 1
- No. of episodes: 7

Production
- Executive producers: Ron Howard; Tony Ganz
- Producer: Jeffrey Ganz
- Running time: 45 minutes (pilot); 30 minutes (series)

Original release
- Network: HBO
- Release: July 3, 1984
- Release: March 5 – April 9, 1985

Maximum Security is an American drama television series that originally aired on HBO from July 1984 to March 1985. The series depicts the everyday life and struggles of supermax prison inmates and psychiatrist who works on the prisoners' rehabilitation. The pilot premiered on July 3, 1984, and the six-part series began on March 5, 1985. Its stars included Robert Desiderio, Geoffrey Lewis, and Jean Smart. Among its directors were Sharron Miller and Gilbert Moses. The series was filmed at the Lincoln Heights jail in Los Angeles, California, USA.

== Cast ==
- Robert Desiderio as prisoner Harry Kanschneider
- Geoffrey Lewis as prisoner Frank Murphy
- Trinidad Silva as prisoner Puck
- Jean Smart as psychologist, then deputy warden, Dr. Allison Brody
- Robert Alan Browne as the associate warden, Leonard Thigpen
- Stephen Elliott as the warden, McShane
- Stan Shaw as prisoner Papa Jack
- Art Evans as prisoner Papa Jack (pilot episode only)
- Panchito Gómez as prisoner Benny
- Tony Plana as prisoner Benny (pilot episode only)
- Gene Ross as prison guard Clarence
- J.W. Smith as prison guard
- Tyler Tyhurst as prisoner Snake

== Episodes ==
No.	Title	Directed by	Written by	Original release date
1	Pilot	Bill Duke	Joel Blasberg	July 3, 1984
2	"Respect"	Arthur Seidelman	Dennis Cooper	March 5, 1985
3	"Cottage 9"	Sharron Miller	Joel Blasberg	March 12, 1985
4	"Sexual Politics"	Michael Bortman	Howard Chesley	March 19, 1985
5	"I Never Ran for My Father: Part 1"	Gilbert Moses	Karen Hall	March 26, 1985
6	"I Never Ran for My Father: Part 2"	Gilbert Moses	Karen Hall	April 2, 1985
7	"Sleep Tight"	Jeffrey Ganz	Frank South	April 9, 1985
