= Daya Vaidya =

American actress (born 1980)

- Born: Daya Vivian Vaidya; May 20, 1980 (age 46); Kathmandu, Nepal
- Occupation: Actress
- Years active: 1998–present
- Spouse: Don Wallace
- Children: 3, Leela Grace Wallace, Jai Blue Wallace, Dev Eshaan Wallace

Daya Vivian Vaidya (born May 20, 1980) is an American actress, known for her roles in the television series Unforgettable (2011–12), Bosch (2016–21), and The Black Hamptons (2022–present).

== Early life ==
Vaidya was born on May 20, 1980, in Kathmandu, Nepal, to a South Asian, Gujurati father and an Italian/Spanish-American mother. Her parents moved with her to Oakland, California, when she was two years old. She began performing in plays and musicals at the age of eleven, as well as training in all forms of dance from tap, ballet and contemporary - to hip-hop. She went on to major in dance at UCLA and dance on scholarship at Alvin Ailey American Dance Theater in New York City. She finished school with a BFA in Theater Arts from the University of California, Los Angeles. She currently resides in Los Angeles.

== Career ==
Vaidya began her career appearing in a recurring role on the WB television series, Hyperion Bay in 1999, and the following year made her film debut with a secondary role in the horror-comedy Leprechaun in the Hood. She guest-starred on television series such as NCIS, All of Us, Cuts and Two and a Half Men. In 2011, Vaidya was cast as a series regular in the CBS crime drama series, Unforgettable. She was fired after single season. Since then, she had the recurring roles in the ABC family series, Twisted in 2013, and the Amazon crime drama Bosch from 2016 to 2021. In 2017 she had a recurring role in the ABC daytime soap opera, General Hospital.

In 2022, Vaidya was cast in the BET+ drama series, The Black Hamptons. In 2023 she also had a recurring role as Onomatopoeia in the CW superhero series, Superman & Lois.

== Personal life ==
Vaidya is married to Don Wallace. They have a daughter, Leela Grace, born in 2009. Vaidya gave birth to identical twin boys on July 25, 2012, in New York City; Jai Blue and Dev Eshaan.

== Filmography ==
=== Film ===
Year	Title	Role	Notes
2000	Leprechaun in the Hood	Waitress #1	Video
2003	Naked Brown Men	Gina	
2004	My Baby's Daddy	Background Dancer	
2004	Out On Parole	Glenda	Video
2005	Almost Too Late	Lisa	
2005	Clean Up Men	Yvette	
2007	Motives 2	Sandra	Video
2007	Wifey	Eva Jones	TV movie
2007	April Fools	Eva Hernandez	Video
2007	The Hit	Day	
2009	Blue	Carmen	
2017	Beacon Hill	Officer Crystal M. Davis	
2017	7x7	Detective Reyes	
2020	Blue: The American Dream	Carmen	

=== Television ===
Year	Title	Role	Notes
1998	One World	Dr. Johnson	Recurring Cast: Season 1
1999	Hyperion Bay	Emily	Recurring Cast
2002	Haunted	Nichelle	Episode: "Grievous Angels"
2002	Robbery Homicide Division	M'lissa	Episode: "In/Famous"
2005	NCIS	Keisha 'Summer Diamond' Scott	Episode: "Pop Life"
2005	Cuts	Wendy	Episode: "A Superstar is Born"
2005-06	All of Us	Andrea	Recurring Cast: Season 3
2007	Lincoln Heights	A.D.A. Margolies	Episode: "The Old Man and the G"
2007	Dexter	FBI Agent #2	Episode: "That Night, A Forest Grew"
2008	Two and a Half Men	Lucy	Episode: "Best H.O. Money Can Buy"
2011-12	Unforgettable	Nina Inara	Main Cast: Season 1
2013	Twisted	Sandy Palmer	Recurring Cast
2015	Castle	Sophia Del Cordova	Episode: "Private Eye Caramba!"
2016-21	Bosch	Jen Kowski	Recurring Cast: Season 2 & 4-7, Guest: Season 3
2017	General Hospital	Martina Morales	Regular Cast
2017	Major Crimes	Det. Linda Chavez	Episode: "Conspiracy Theory: Part 3"
2021	The Mediator	Herself	Episode: "A Tale of Two Sisters"
2022	Good Trouble	Martina Morales	Recurring Cast: Season 4
2022	Grey's Anatomy	Paola Bright	Episode: "Thunderstruck"
2022-24	The Black Hamptons	Vanessa Britton	Main Cast
2023	NCIS: Los Angeles	Marina	Episode: "Best Seller"
2023	Superman & Lois	Peia Mannheim	Recurring Cast: Season 3
