= Under One Roof (1995 TV series) =

- Genre: Drama
- Created by: Paul Aaron; Michael Henry Brown
- Written by: Paul Aaron; Michael Henry Brown; Carol Evan McKeand; Rogers Turrentine; Valerie Woods; Martha Williamson
- Directed by: Thomas Carter; Michael Engler; Eric Laneuville; Ian Sander; Michael W. Watkins
- Starring: Joe Morton; Vanessa Bell Calloway; Essence Atkins; Merlin Santana; Monique Ridge; Ronald Joshua Scott; James Earl Jones
- Theme music composer: Stephen James Taylor
- Composers: Greg De Belles; Kurt Farquhar; Stephen James Taylor
- Country of origin: United States
- Original language: English
- No. of seasons: 1
- No. of episodes: 6

Production
- Executive producer: Thomas Carter
- Producers: Penelope Foster; Jeanne Marie Van Cott
- Running time: 45-48 minutes
- Production companies: The Thomas Carter Company; CBS Entertainment Productions

Original release
- Network: CBS
- Release: March 14 – April 18, 1995

Under One Roof is an American drama television series that aired on CBS from March 14 to April 18, 1995. A family drama, the series starred James Earl Jones, Joe Morton and Vanessa Bell Calloway.

== Synopsis ==
Under One Roof follows the lives of three generations of a middle class African American family sharing a two-family house in Seattle, Washington. The lower unit is occupied by family patriarch Nesbit "Neb" Langston (Jones), a recently widowed police officer who has adopted a troubled foster child, Marcus Henry (Merlin Santana). Neb's daughter Ayesha (Monique Ridge) also lives with them.

The upper unit is occupied by Neb's adult son Ron (Morton), his wife and his children. Ron is a former Marine who is attempting to deal with the stress of opening his own business. Meanwhile, Ron's wife Maggie (Calloway) is having reservations about re-entering the workforce after being a stay-at-home mom for the couple's two children, son Derrick (Ronald Joshua Scott), a Type 1 diabetic, and daughter Charlie (Essence Atkins).

The series, which was a midseason replacement for CBS, was cancelled after six episodes. It later reran on cable network TV One in the mid-2000s.

== Cast and characters ==
=== Main ===
- Joe Morton as Ron Langston
- Vanessa Bell Calloway as Margaret "Maggie" Louise Langston
- Essence Atkins as Charlotte "Charlie" Langston
- Merlin Santana as Marcus Henry
- Monique Ridge as Ayesha (née Beverly) Langston
- Ronald Joshua Scott as Derrick Langston
- James Earl Jones as Nesbit "Neb" Langston

=== Recurring ===
- Terence Knox as Matt "Siggy" Sigalos

== Production ==
Many scenes were filmed in the old Ballard High School and the Phinney Neighborhood Center in Seattle.

== Episodes ==
| No. | Title | Directed by | Original release date | Prod. code |
|---|---|---|---|---|
| 1 | "Rooms" | Thomas Carter | March 14, 1995 | 101 |
The Langston family adjusts to the new, multi-generational living arrangements. In order to ensure that his new hardware store opens on the scheduled date, Ron breaks his promise to join Derrick in a father-son competition at school. Marcus continues to grapple with memories of his biological mother, who died of a drug overdose when he was 13. Charlie steals Maggie's credit card in order to buy a new dress for a party.
| 2 | "Daddy's Girl" | Ian Sander | March 21, 1995 | 103 |
Neb's interference complicates Ayesha's relationship with her boyfriend Roger (Michael Jace), but the biggest obstacle is Roger's womanizing. A client of the hardware store exhibits racist attitudes towards Ron, who is furious when Siggy wants to do business with him anyway. When Derrick wants to change his image, Marcus introduces him to gangsta rap music and revamps his wardrobe. Unfortunately, his attitude experiences a revamp as well.
| 3 | "Pilot" | Thomas Carter | March 28, 1995 | 100 |
Maggie finally earns her Bachelor of Science degree in Health Services Administration. Dietary choices are a major issue for Derrick, who is a Type 1 diabetic. Marcus' plan to get a new pair of shoes for the graduation ceremony backfires, as does Ron and Maggie's plan to spend the evening together alone.
| 4 | "Sophisticated Lady, Not!" | Eric Laneuville | April 4, 1995 | 102 |
Fifteen-year-old Charlie secretly goes out with one of Ayesha's design students (Jon Clair), but finds herself way over her head when she goes back to the college man's house. Maggie goes through a minor midlife crisis after her age prevents her from landing a new job. When talking to his classmates, Derrick makes Neb's job on the police force sound much more exciting than it is in reality.
| 5 | "Secrets" | Michael Watkins | April 11, 1995 | 104 |
One of Charlie's African-American friends (Malinda Williams) lets her racist feelings show when Charlie starts spending more time with a White classmate. Problems arises when Maggie's overbearing mother (Leslie Uggams) visits. Neb goes out with a high school teacher (Joan Pringle) — his first date since his wife's death.
| 6 | "Ronnie's Got a Gun" | Michael Engler | April 18, 1995 | 105 |
After he inadvertently walks in on an armed robbery at the hardware store, Ron has difficulty coping with the trauma surrounding the incident; Siggy gives him a handgun. Marcus deduces the identity of the robbers – and that one of them is an old friend of his. Charlie tries to win the prize in a bake-off sponsored by a local morning show.

== Awards and nominations ==
| Year | Award | Category | Recipient | Result |
|---|---|---|---|---|
| 1995 | Emmy Award | Outstanding Supporting Actor in a Drama Series | James Earl Jones | Nominated |
| 1996 | NAACP Image Awards | Outstanding Lead Actress in a Drama Series | Vanessa Bell Calloway | Nominated |
| 1996 | NAACP Image Awards | Outstanding Drama Series | Under One Roof | Nominated |
