= Bern Nadette Stanis =

American actress and author

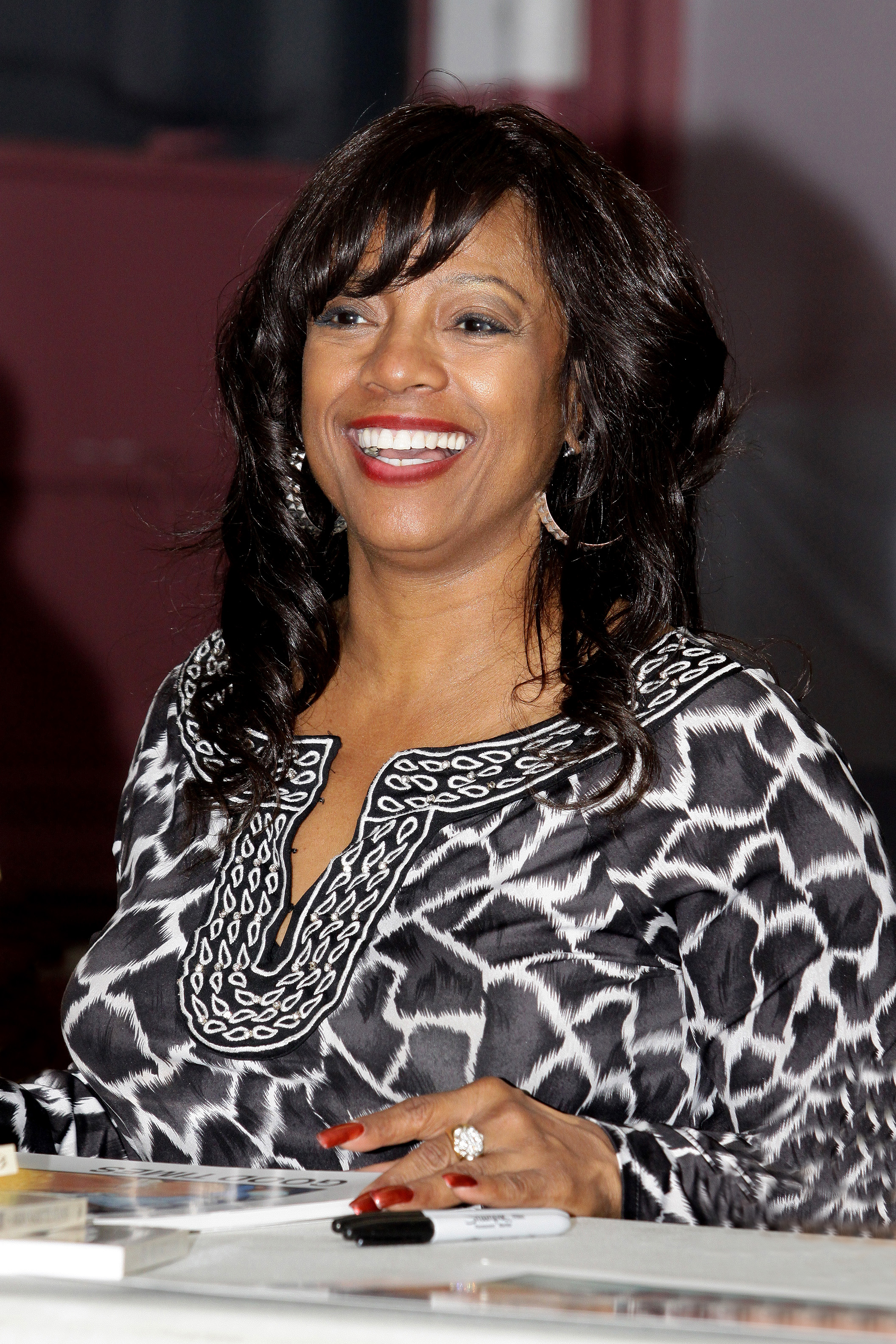
- Stanis speaks to Cabrini-Green public housing residents in Chicago, April 2010.
- Born: Bernadette Stanislaus; December 22, 1953 (age 72); Brooklyn, New York, U.S.
- Other names: BernNadette Stanis; Bernadette Stanis; Bern Nadette
- Education: Juilliard School
- Occupations: Actress, author
- Years active: 1974–present
- Known for: Thelma Evans – Good Times
- Spouses: Thomas Fauntleroy (m. 1974; div. 1978); Darnell Johnson (m. 1979; div. 1981); Terrence Redd (m. 1981; div. 1987); Kevin Fantana (m. 1991)
- Children: 2
- Website: thelmaofgoodtimes.com

Bern Nadette Stanis (born Bernadette Stanislaus; December 22, 1953) is an American actress and author. Stanis is best known for her role as Thelma Ann Evans-Anderson, the only daughter of Florida and James Evans Sr. on the CBS sitcom Good Times which originally ran from 1974 until 1979. Stanis is the author of four books: Situations 101: Relationships, The Good, The Bad & The Ugly; For Men Only; Situations 101: Finances; and The Last Night.

== Early life ==
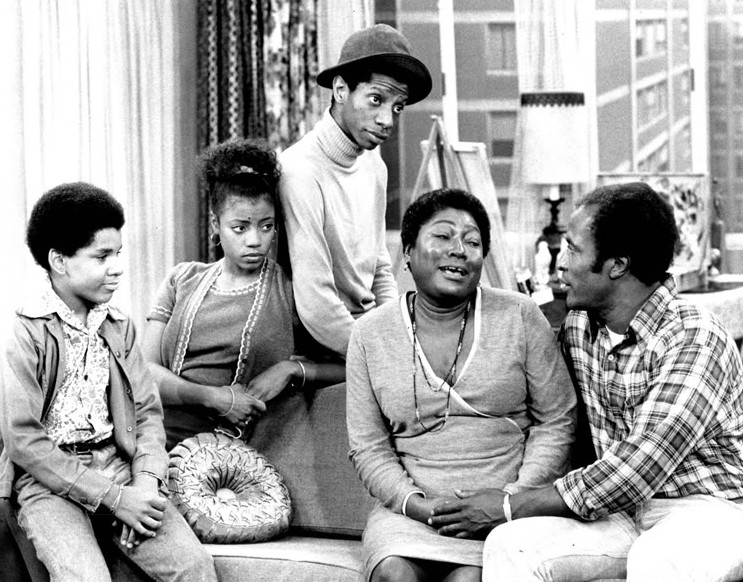
On Good Times (1974), L-R: Ralph Carter, Bern Nadette Stanis, Jimmie Walker, Esther Rolle, and John Amos.

One of five children, Stanis was born and raised in the Brownsville section of Brooklyn, New York City. Her paternal grandparents were from Carriacou in the Grenadine Islands. She attended Erasmus Hall High School and later attended the Juilliard School. As a teen, Stanis entered Miss Black America pageants, and went on to become Miss Brooklyn, a title with which she became first runner-up in the Miss New York state pageant.

== Career ==
Stanis played the role of Thelma Ann Evans on the CBS sitcom Good Times from February 1974 to August 1979. After the series ended, she made appearances on television shows including The Cosby Show and What's Happening Now!!. She and former co-star Jimmie Walker lent their voices to a radio spot for AT&T, and Stanis went on to do a Nationwide Insurance commercial. Stanis has been featured in promotions for the TV One network, and in a "Thelma" promotion that aired September 19, 2009, alongside actress Anna Maria Horsford in the "Battle of the Thelmas" that aired their weddings from their respective TV series. (Horsford portrayed "Thelma Frye" in the TV series Amen.) During the "Way Black Then" promotions in February 2010 in honor of Black History Month, she and Walker appeared on the program Color TV to share their memories and thoughts on Good Times. She later appeared on the TV One show Life After. In July 2016, Stanis appeared on an episode of Centric's Being, discussing her life and career.

== Personal life ==
Stanis has been married four times. Her first marriage was to high-school sweetheart Thomas Fauntleroy from June 1974 until 1978, then to Brooklyn nightclub owner Darnell Johnson from January 1979 until early-1981. Stanis' third marriage was to mechanical engineer Terrence Redd on December 27, 1981. Stanis gave birth to their daughter Dior Ravel circa April 1982. The couple later divorced in 1987. Her fourth husband is Kevin Fontana; an article in 2012 said they had been married 31 years, but other sources (cited above) state that Stanis was married to Redd circa 1981. Stanis also has a second child, daughter Brittany Rose. Stanis lives in Atlanta, Georgia, with her children.

== Filmography ==
=== Television ===
Year	Show	Role	Notes
1974–1979	Good Times	Thelma Ann Evans–Anderson	133 episodes (as Bern Nadette Stanis)
1980	The Love Boat	Janet Reeves	Episode: "Invisible Maniac/September Song/Peekaboo"
1985	What's Happening Now!!	Marcie	Episode: "Married or Not"
1987	Bustin' Loose	Ms. Fisher	Episode: "I Paint What I See"
1991	The Cosby Show	Carolyn Thompson	Episode: "Adventures in Babysitting"
1997	The Good News	Audrey	Episode: "The Baby on the Door Step"
1997	The Wayans Bros.	Thelma Evans	Episode: "Unspoken Token"
1999	The Parent 'Hood	L'Tonya	Episode: "Mommy Dearest"
2003	Girlfriends	Herself	Episode: "Where Everyone Knows My Name"
2015	Black Jesus	Bernadette	Episodes: "Thy Neighbor's Strife", "Good for Nothing"
2019	Live in Front of a Studio Audience: Good Times	Herself	
2022–present	The Family Business	Nee Nee Duncan	
2025	The Family Business: New Orleans	Nee Nee Duncan	Series regular

=== Film ===
Year	Film	Role	Notes
2000	Hidden Blessings	Jackson's Lawyer	TV movie
2004	Land of the Free?	Psychiatrist	
2004	Still 'Bout It	Aunt Tee Dee	Direct-to-video
2006	The Engagement: My Phamily BBQ 2	Mrs. Clark	
2009	Caution! Heartache Ahead	Vera	
2009	The Adventures of Umbweki	Usahnisa	
2009	In the Midnight Hours	Cheryl	
2010	N-Secure	Dr. Heather	
2015	36 Hour Layover	Nina's Mother	Alternative title: No Regrets

=== Music video ===
Year	Video	Notes	Role
1993	Car Hoppers	Song by Positive K	Model/Rapper

== Bibliography ==
- Stanis, Bern Nadette (2006). Situations 101. The Worthingham Group. ISBN 978-0-9770361-0-3.
