= Vanessa Bell Calloway =

American actress (born 1957)

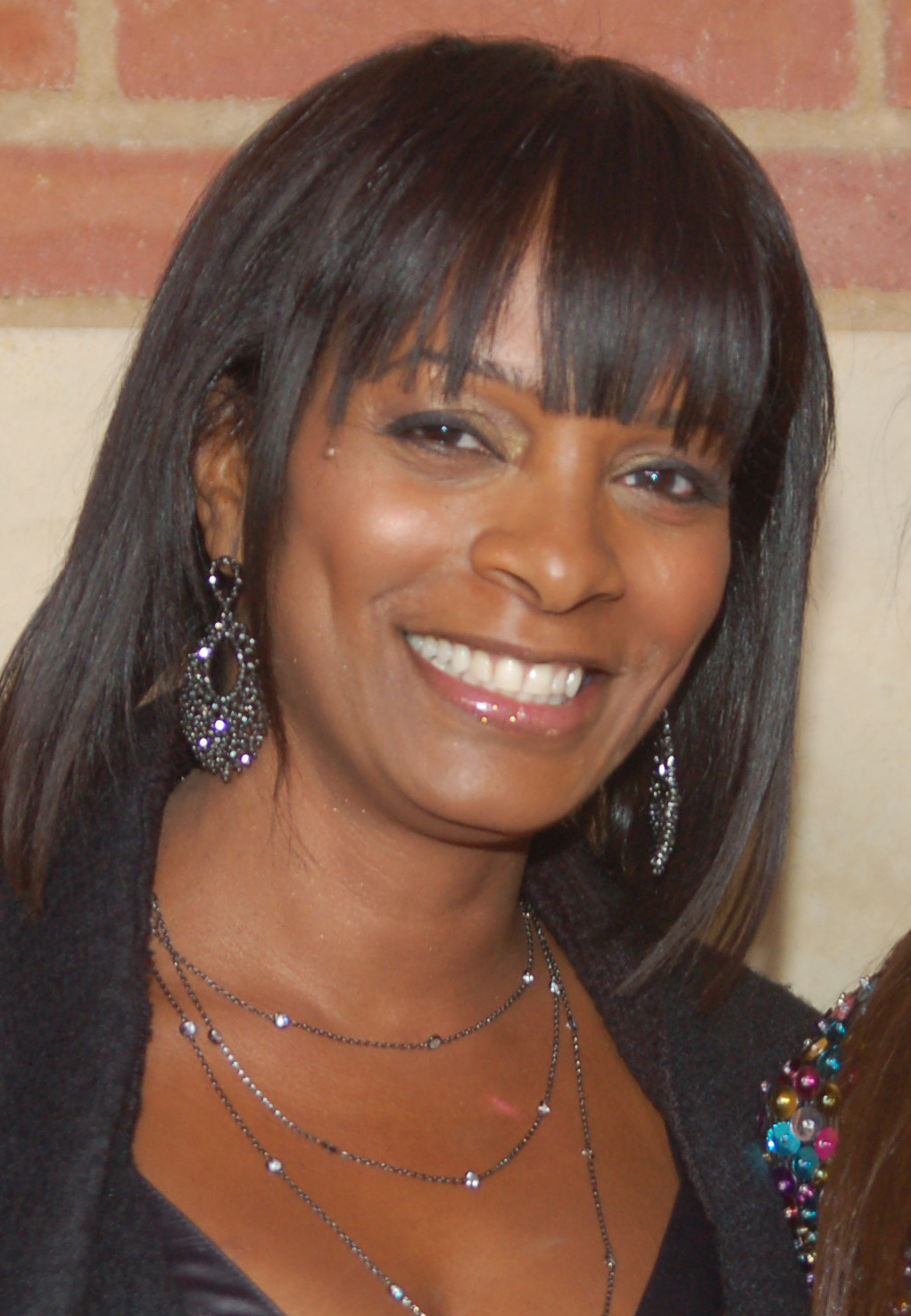
- Bell Calloway in 2010
- Born: Vanessa Bell; March 20, 1957 (age 69); Cleveland, Ohio, U.S.
- Education: Ohio University
- Occupation: Actress
- Years active: 1984–present
- Spouse: Anthony Calloway (m. 1988)
- Children: 2
- Website: vanessabellcalloway.com

Vanessa Bell Calloway (née Bell; born March 20, 1957) is an American actress. Beginning her career as a dancer, Bell Calloway became known for her film roles as Princess Imani Izzi in the 1988 comedy Coming to America and its sequel. Since then, Bell Calloway appeared in more than 150 film and television productions. She is a nine-time NAACP Image Awards nominee.

Bell Calloway appeared in films Death Spa (1988), What's Love Got to Do with It (1993), The Inkwell (1994), Crimson Tide (1995), Daylight (1996), The Brothers (2001) and Biker Boyz (2003). Bell Calloway had several starring roles on television series and movies, include first African American prime time soap opera, Under One Roof (1995). She later played recurring roles on Hawthorne, Shameless and This Is Us. From 2016 to 2022, she starred as Lady Ella Johnson in the Bounce TV prime time soap opera, Saints & Sinners and in 2022 began starring in BET+ crime drama, The Black Hamptons. Bell Callaway played Marian Shields Robinson in the biographical drama film Southside with You (2016), and Harriet Tubman's mother in the biographical film, Harriet (2019).

== Early life ==
Bell Calloway was born on March 20, 1957, in Cleveland, Ohio. She received a Bachelor of Fine Arts from Ohio University, where she became a member of Alpha Kappa Alpha sorority. Bell Calloway also studied dance with Alvin Ailey, George Faison, and Otis Sallid. Bell Calloway began her career as a dancer in Michael Bennett's original Broadway production of Dreamgirls. It was during this time period that Bell Calloway directed the music video "Angel Man" for soul singer Rhetta Hughes. She also was in the ensemble of the short-lived musical Bring Back Birdie.

== Career ==
Bell Calloway began her acting career in the ABC daytime soap opera, All My Children in 1985. After moving to Los Angeles in 1986, she began appearing in episodes of prime time shows such as The Colbys, Falcon Crest, 227, China Beach, A Different World, and L.A. Law. She made her film debut on Number One with a Bullet (1987), before supporting role of Eddie Murphy's character's arranged wife in the 1988 comedy Coming to America. In 1990, she co-starred alongside Joe Morton in the ABC drama series, Equal Justice.

During the 1990s, she had number of supporting roles in films, including What's Love Got to Do with It (1993) opposite Angela Bassett, The Inkwell (1994), and Crimson Tide (1995) as Denzel Washington's character wife. She also voiced a leading role in the 1992 dystopian animated film, Bebe's Kids. She had number of leading and supporting roles in the made for television movies. In 1995, she co-starred opposite James Earl Jones and former co-star Joe Morton in the short-lived CBS prime time soap opera, Under One Roof, the first drama series to feature African-American lead characters. For her role on the series, Calloway was nominated for the NAACP Image Award for Outstanding Actress in a Drama Series. She also had the leading roles on the short-leved NBC sitcom Rhythm & Blues (1992–93), and starred alongside Larry Hagman as his girlfriend in the CBS drama Orleans (1997).

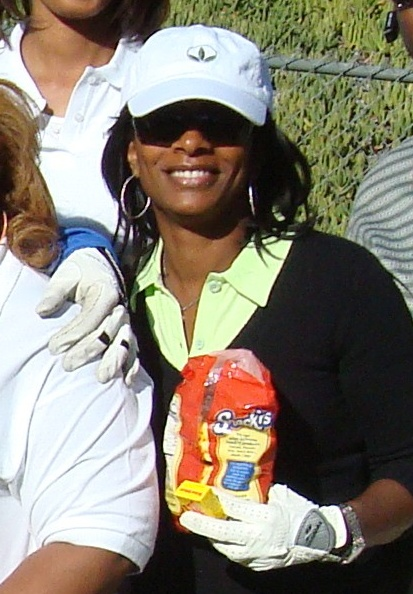
Bell Calloway in 2007

In the 2000s, she had recurring roles on Boston Public and The District. She co-starred in films including The Brothers, All About You, Dawg, Biker Boyz, Love Don't Cost a Thing, and Cheaper by the Dozen. Bell Calloway also guest starred on The Division, Strong Medicine, The Closer, CSI: Crime Scene Investigation, Dexter, Rizzoli & Isles, and Castle. From 2010 to 2011, she had a recurring role in the TNT medical drama, Hawthorne. In 2011, she began appearing in the Showtime comedy-drama, Shameless.

In 2016, she was cast as lead character in the Bounce TV first prime time soap opera, Saints & Sinners as Lady Ella Johnson, the widow of pastor and manipulative "First Lady of the Church". Also in 2016, Bell Calloway co-starred as president Obama's future mother-in-law, Marian Shields Robinson, opposite Tika Sumpter as Michelle Obama, in the comedy-drama film Southside with You, which premiered at the 2016 Sundance Film Festival. She guest starred on the ABC medical drama Grey's Anatomy.

In 2018, she appeared in the Christian drama film Unbroken: Path to Redemption and the crime thriller Dragged Across Concrete. In 2019, she played abolitionist Harriet Tubman's mother in the biographical drama film Harriet. She reprised her role as Imani Izzi in the 2021 sequel, Coming 2 America. The following year she was cast in the BET+ crime drama series, The Black Hamptons.

In 2023, Bell Calloway made her directorial debut with the drama film Black Girl Erupted for BET Her.

== Personal life ==
Bell Calloway married anesthesiologist Dr. Anthony Calloway in 1988. They have two daughters, Ashley and Alexandra. Ashley was one of the stars of the BET series Baldwin Hills which originally ran from 2007 until 2009.

In 2009, Bell Calloway was diagnosed with ductal carcinoma, an early stage of breast cancer. She underwent two lumpectomies, and then a mastectomy. She subsequently underwent reconstructive surgery, in which tissue from her stomach was used to reconstruct her breast. She recounted her experience in an October 2015 essay in Ebony magazine, by which point she had been cancer-free for six years.

== Filmography ==
=== Film ===
Year	Title	Role	Notes
1987	Number One with a Bullet	Woman	
1988	The Return of Desperado	Molly Pickett	TV movie
1988	Coming to America	Princess Imani Izzi	
1988	The Loner	Carver	TV movie
1989	Polly	Nancy Dodds	TV movie
1989	A Little Bit Strange	Marilyn McClane-Masterson	TV movie
1989	Death Spa	Marci Hewitt	
1990	Piece of Cake	Doreen	TV movie
1992	Memphis	Martha Kinship	TV movie
1992	Stompin' at the Savoy	Dorothy	TV movie
1992	Bebe's Kids	Jamika (voice)	
1992	Why Colors?	-	Short
1993	What's Love Got to Do with It	Jackie	
1994	The Inkwell	Francis Phillips	
1995	Crimson Tide	Julia Hunter	
1996	America's Dream	Miss Dina Williams	TV movie
1996	Daylight	Grace Calloway	
1996	The Cherokee Kid	Abby Holsopple	TV movie
1998	Archibald the Rainbow Painter	Diana	
1998	When It Clicks	Catherine Douglass	Short
2000	A Private Affair	Nikita Harrell	TV movie
2000	Love Song	Evie Livingston	TV movie
2001	The Brothers	Dr. Thelma Woolridge	
2001	All About You	Donna	
2002	The Red Sneakers	Berniece	TV movie
2002	Dawg	Christine Hodges	
2003	Biker Boyz	Anita	
2003	Love Don't Cost a Thing	Vivian Johnson	
2003	Cheaper by the Dozen	Diana Philips	
2004	Pryor Offenses'	Gertrude	TV movie
2007	Stompin'	Mrs. Jackson	
2008	Lakeview Terrace	Aunt Dorrie	
2009	Truly Blessed	Lynda	
2009	Aussie and Ted's Great Adventure	Mrs. Jones	
2009	The Killing of Wendy	Wendy	
2009	Applause for Miss E	Miss E	TV movie
2012	The Last Fall	Marie Bishop	
2012	A Beautiful Soul	Guardian Angel	
2012	The Obama Effect	Molly Thomas	
2012	The Undershepherd	Deaconess Carter	
2013	Between Sisters	Lilian	TV movie
2013	Holla II	Marion	
2014	The Divorce	Eva	TV movie
2015	To Hell and Back	Colleen	TV movie
2015	Emergency Contact	Ruthie Biltmore	TV movie
2015	About Scout	Faith Price	
2015	The Bricks: White Betty	Sharon	Short
2016	Southside with You	Marian Shields Robinson	
2016	Lark	Aziza	Short
2016	Love Under New Management: The Miki Howard Story	Josephine Howard	
2016	Post Life	Diane McIntosh	Short
2016	The Bounce Back	Ellen	
2016	LAPD African Cops	Officer Collins	
2017	The Preacher's Son	Elena	
2017	Message from a Mistress	Heather	
2017	Girl Minus	Ivys Mom	
2018	Love, Once and Always	Isabel	TV movie
2018	Dragged Across Concrete	Jennifer Johns	
2018	Unbroken: Path to Redemption	Lila Burkholder	
2018	Thriller	Mrs. Jackson	
2018	Her Only Choice	Dr. Bailey	
2018	Throwback Holiday	Mildred Anderson	
2018	The Counter: 1960	Nicole	Short
2019	American Skin	Bernice	
2019	Harriet	Rit Ross	
2021	Saints & Sinners Judgment Day	Ella	TV movie
2021	Coming 2 America	Princess Imani Izzi	
2021	Baby	Jackie	Short
2021	A Holiday Chance	Sheryl Chance	
2022	Starkeisha	The Voice	Short
2022	The Devil You Know	Della Cowans	
2022	Mosquito	Eve	
2023	Black Girl Erupted	Dr. Rebecca Francis	
2023	Under the Boardwalk	Val (voice)	
2025	One of Them Days	Mama Ruth	
2025	333	Gretta	Short

=== Television ===
Year	Title	Role	Notes
1985	All My Children	Yvonne Caldwell	Regular Cast
1985	Days of Our Lives	Denise Preston	Regular Cast
1986	The Colbys	Lowell Sherman	Episode: "The Trial"
1986	Simon & Simon	Julie	Episode: "Act Five"
1986	Falcon Crest	Nurse	Episode: "Double Jeopardy"
1987	227	Sherry	Episode: "The Honeymoon's Over"
1988	Days of Our Lives	Charlene	Regular Cast
1989	Webster	Denice	Episode: "A-Camping We Will Go"
1989	In the Heat of the Night	Audrey Moore	Episode: "Accused"
1989	Disneyland	Nancy	Episode: "Polly"
1989	1st & Ten	Della King	Episode: "Final Bow" & "Out of the Past"
1990	Dragnet	Receptionist	Episode: "Millie"
1990	Max Monroe: Loose Cannon	Velma Jones	Episode: "Freaks"
1990	Equal Justice	Delia Wayne	Recurring Cast: Season 1
1990	The Tracey Ullman Show	Cindy #4	Episode: "Episode #4.23"
1990	China Beach	Sweet Hula	Episode: "One Giant Leap"
1990	A Different World	Lily Connors	Episode: "A Campfire Story"
1991	L.A. Law	Robyn Edwards	Episode: "Splatoon"
1991	Father Dowling Mysteries	Dr. Emily Stone	Episode: "The Monkey Business Mystery"
1991	The 100 Lives of Black Jack Savage	Rene	Episode: "Look for the Union Label"
1991	Doctor Doctor	Gail Butterfield	Episode: "Butterfields Are Free"
1991	A Different World	Danielle Vinson	Episode: "The Cash Isn't Always Greener"
1992	Dream On	Jeanette	Episode: "Red All Over" & "The Guilty Party"
1992–93	Rhythm & Blues	Colette Hawkins	Main Cast
1993	The Sinbad Show	Michelle Michaels	Episode: "The Par-tay"
1993	Where I Live	Delia	Episode: "The Big Easy"
1995	Under One Roof	Maggie Langston	Main Cast
1995	Touched by an Angel	Debra Willis	Episode: "The Driver"
1996	Intimate Portrait	Herself	Episode: "Vanessa Williams"
1997	Orleans	Rosalee Clark	Main Cast
1997	Sparks	Monique	Episode: "Too Hot Not to Cool Down"
1997	Happily Ever After: Fairy Tales for Every Child	Princess Katusha (voice)	Episode: "The Golden Goose"
1998	Nickelodeon Sports Theater with Shaquille O'Neal	Herself	Episode: "First Time"
1998	Prey	Grace	Episode: "Revelations" & "Infiltration"
1998	The Gregory Hines Show	Kyra Lewis	Episode: "Wahunthra"
1998	Moesha	Dr. Madeline Woods	Episode: "Psyche Your Mind"
1998	The Temptations	Johnnie Mae Matthews	Episode: "Part I & II"
1999	Intimate Portrait	Herself	Episode: "Star Jones"
1999	Malcolm & Eddie	Vina Jensen	Episode: "Daddio"
2001	Diagnosis: Murder	Mrs. Calender	Episode: "No Good Deed"
2001	Boston Public	Mrs. Michelle Ronning	Recurring Cast: Season 1
2001	The Division	Dana	Episode: "The First Hit's Free, Baby"
2002	One on One	Michelle McCall	Episode: "The Way You Make Me Feel"
2002	The Parkers	Alaina	Episode: "And the Winner Is..."
2003–04	10-8: Officers on Duty	Gina Barnes	Recurring Cast
2003–04	The District	Gwen Hendrix	Recurring Cast: Season 4
2004	CSI: Miami	Tonya Washington	Episode: "Speed Kills"
2004	Strong Medicine	Melanie Rhodes	Episode: "Foreign Bodies"
2005	Black in the 80s	Herself	Episode: "Color in Film"
2005	Joan of Arcadia	Corey Phillips	Episode: "Shadows and Light"
2006	The Closer	Lynn Talmadge	Episode: "Slippin'"
2006	All of Us	Marvella James	Episode: "Like Father, Like Son... Like Hell!" & "My Two Dads"
2009	CSI: Crime Scene Investigation	Judge Gina Himmel	Episode: "Miscarriage of Justice"
2009	Cold Case	Geraldine Watkins (1970)	Episode: "Soul"
2010	Dexter	Dr. Vanessa Abrams	Episode: "Practically Perfect"
2010	Outlaw	-	Episode: "In Re: Kelvin Jones"
2010–11	Hawthorne	Gail Strummer	Recurring Cast: Season 2–3
2011	Detroit 1-8-7	Bonnie McCord	Episode: "Stone Cold"
2011	Let's Stay Together	Mimi	Episode: "Daddy's Home"
2011	Harry's Law	Judge Jude Campbell	Episode: "Queen of Snark" & "Insanity"
2011–21	Shameless	Carol Fisher	Recurring Cast: Season 1 & 3–6 & 11, Guest: Season 2 & 10
2012	Ringer	Agent Royce Wiegler	Episode "I'm the Good Twin"
2012	Go On	Joyce Gold	Episode: "Videogame, Set, Match" & "Dinner Takes All"
2012–13	Rizzoli & Isles	A.D.A. Edna Calloway	Recurring Cast: Season 3, Guest: Season 4
2013	Life After	Herself	Episode: "Sheryl Lee Ralph: Life After Dreamgirls"
2013	Castle	Beryl Wickfield	Episode: "Time Will Tell"
2014	Roomieloverfriends	Herself	Episode: "Episode #3.4"
2014	NCIS	Sally Hammond	Episode: "Crescent City: Part 1"
2014	Reckless	Judge Ella Kress	Episode: "Parting Shots"
2014	Almost Home	Jocelyn Sanders	Episode: "She Wants That Old Thing Back..."
2015	Murder in the First	Veronza Ervin	Episode: "Oh, Mexico" & "Out of the Shadows"
2015	Real Husbands of Hollywood	Trina's Mother	Episode: "When Kevin Met Salli"
2015	Hand of God	Eunetta Graham	Episode: "He So Loved" & "The Tie That Binds"
2015	In the Cut	Samantha	Episode: "Like Father, Like Son"
2016	Unsung Hollywood	Herself	Episode: "Vanessa Bell Calloway"
2016	Grey's Anatomy	Lucinda Gamble	Recurring Cast: Season 12
2016–22	Saints & Sinners	Lady Ella Johnson	Main Cast
2017	Being	Herself	Episode: "Vanessa Bell Calloway"
2017	Survivor's Remorse	Camille Jordan	Recurring Cast: Season 4
2018	Love Is	'Wiser' Angela	Episode: "(Her) Questions"
2019	Rel	Nancy	Episode: "Mom"
2019	A Black Lady Sketch Show	Kiley's Mother Rita	Episode: "3rd & Bonaparte Is Always in the Shade"
2019	Unbelievable	Sarah	Episode: "Episode 3"
2019	The Conners	Carrie Langham	Episode: "Smoking Penguins and Santa on Santa Action"
2019–20	Black Monday	Ruth	Guest Cast: Season 1–2
2021	Sacrifice	Carol Steinburg	Episode: "Sacrifice"
2021–22	Kenan	Bobbi	Guest Cast: Season 1–2
2022	This Is Us	Edie	Recurring Cast: Season 6
2022	Queen Sugar	Betty	Episode: "We Can Be"
2022–23	Wicked City	Tabitha	Main Cast: Season 1-2
2022–24	The Black Hamptons	Carolyn Britton	Main Cast
2023	Grand Crew	Brenda	Episode: "Wine & Children"
2024	Great Performances	Idella Landy	Episode: "Purlie Victorious"
2024–25	The Vince Staples Show	Anita	Recurring Cast
2026	The Varnell Hill Show	Joy	Episode: "Spring Chicken"

=== Music video ===
Year	Song	Artist
1984	"What's Love Got to Do with It"	Tina Turner

== Awards and nominations ==
Year	Awards	Category	Movie/Serie	Outcome
1994	NAACP Image Award	NAACP Image Award for Outstanding Supporting Actress in a Motion Picture	What's Love Got to Do with It	Nominated
1996	NAACP Image Award	NAACP Image Award for Outstanding Actress in a Drama Series	Under One Roof	Nominated
1997	NAACP Image Award	NAACP Image Award for Outstanding Actress in a Television Movie, Mini-Series or Dramatic Special	America's Dream	Nominated
1998	NAACP Image Award	NAACP Image Award for Outstanding Actress in a Drama Series	Orleans	Nominated
1999	NAACP Image Award	NAACP Image Award for Outstanding Actress in a Television Movie, Mini-Series or Dramatic Special	The Temptations	Nominated
2002	NAACP Image Award	NAACP Image Award for Outstanding Supporting Actress in a Drama Series	Boston Public	Nominated
2004	NAACP Image Award	NAACP Image Award for Outstanding Supporting Actress in a Drama Series	The District	Nominated
2011	NAACP Image Award	NAACP Image Award for Outstanding Supporting Actress in a Drama Series	Hawthorne	Nominated
2020	NAACP Image Award	Outstanding Ensemble Cast in a Motion Picture	Harriet	Nominated
