= Carl Weber's Influence =

Mystery film by Trey Haley

- Directed by: Trey Haley
- Written by: Carl Weber
- Based on: Influence by Carl Weber
- Produced by: Carl Weber; Veronica Nichols; Nikaya D. Brown Jones; Gregory Ramon Anderson
- Starring: Roger G. Smith; Kellita Smith; Drew Sidora; Nadine Ellis; Columbus Short; Anthony Hamilton; Deborah Cox
- Cinematography: Lucas Pitassi
- Edited by: MJ Whitaker
- Music by: Matthew Head
- Production companies: Tri Destined Studios; Urban Books Media
- Distributed by: BET+
- Release date: February 20, 2020
- Running time: 92 minutes
- Country: United States
- Language: English

Carl Weber's Influence is a 2020 American mystery thriller film written by Carl Weber and directed by Trey Haley. It based on Weber's 2018 novel Influence. The film stars Roger G. Smith, Kellita Smith, Drew Sidora, Nadine Ellis, Columbus Short, and R&B singers Anthony Hamilton and Deborah Cox. Rico Love produced original music for the movie.

It follows the Hudson family, led by famed attorney Bradley Hudson, who are handed the task to defend Grammy Award-winning singer Savannah Kirby (Cox) who has been charged with the murder of her husband Kyle Kirby (Hamilton).

The film was produced by Tri Destined Studios and Urban Books Media and released by BET+ on February 20, 2020, as a streamer' second original movie. It later premiered on BET on September 21, 2021.

== Cast ==
- Roger G. Smith as Bradley Hudson
- Deborah Cox as Savannah Kirby
- Kellita Smith as Carla Hudson
- Drew Sidora as Desiree Hudson
- Todd Anthony as Lamont Hudson
- Gary Dourdan as Perk
- Nadine Ellis as Teresa Graham
- Columbus Short as Billy King
- Anthony Hamilton as Kyle Kirby
- Kent Faulcon as Todd Townson
- Bebe Drake as Cathy Kirby
- Fred Dryer as Howie Goldstein
- Thomas Calabro as Lieutenant Barnes
- Perri Camper as Alexis Ransom
- William L. Johnson as Detective Brown
- Broderick Hunter as Michael Jones
- Carlton Totten as Snow
- Jon Lovitz as Gregg Anderson
- Bruce Davison as Walter Klein
- Sean Patrick Thomas as Jeffrey Bowen
- Nikolay Moss as Mark Goldman
- Mary Mackey as Judge Jeter
- Alex Morris as Auctioneer
- Tyler Abron as Keisha
- Judi Johnson as Reporter
- Todd Cattell as Officer Paul Jones
- Cody Kennedy as Dara Grant
