= April Fools (2007 film) =

2007 horror film directed by Nancy Norman

- DVD cover
- Directed by: Nancy Norman
- Written by: Nancy Norman
- Produced by: Nancy Norman
- Starring: Daya Vaidya; Aaliyah Franks; Darrin Henson; Obba Babatundé
- Cinematography: Jeff Brown
- Edited by: Nancy Norman
- Music by: Donald Hayes
- Production companies: Pa-Pa Productions; Links Entertainment
- Distributed by: IndieFlix; Toucan Cove
- Release date: September 11, 2007
- Running time: 72 minutes
- Country: United States
- Language: English

April Fools is a 2007 American slasher film written, directed and produced by Nancy Norman. It stars Daya Vaidya, Aaliyah Franks, Darrin Henson, and Obba Babatundé.

== Plot ==
While pulling an April Fools' Day prank on a nerdy classmate named Melvin, a group of high school friends (Missy, DeAnna, Eva, Diego, Malik, and Marlin) accidentally kill him when Marlin hits Melvin with a football, causing him to fall on and he is impaled by a piece of rebar as a result. Panicking, the group drag Melvin's body into a wooded area, and stage it to look like he was the victim of a random gang-related attack. Exactly one year later, DeAnna is stabbed to death by a hooded figure while interning at a hospital. After murdering DeAnna, the killer writes "April Fools" on a wall with her blood.

Hearing about DeAnna's death, Missy meets up with the others, convinced that DeAnna's murder may have something to do with Melvin's death, though her worries are dismissed. Later, Eva is stabbed in a locker room after dance practice by the same hooded assailant, who once again writes "April Fools" on a wall in blood. Unaware of Eva's death, Missy goes to the high school's Spring Jam, despite being unnerved by surveillance footage of DeAnna's murder, accidentally left in her room by her detective father.

At the Spring Jam, Missy recognizes the attending killer from the surveillance footage, and looks for help from Malik after witnessing Diego and a teacher be murdered. Malik and the killer fight, sparking a brawl on the dance floor that covers the killer's escape after he fatally stabs Malik. Along with the other revelers, Missy is rounded up by the authorities, and at the police station she admits to her and her friends' involvement in Melvin's death to her father. A police officer escorts Missy home, where she is confronted by "the April Fools Killer" - Marlin, who has killed the officer, and the one stationed at his house. Marlin claims that he was only one affected by Melvin's death, his life falling to shambles after it while everyone else easily moved on, enraging him. Marlin attacks Missy, but she manages to briefly incapacitate him and get outside, a recovered Marlin giving chase.

Marlin soon catches up with Missy but is killed in self defense when she hits him with a rock, and turns his own blade on him. Stumbling away from Marlin's body, Missy collapses into the arms of her father, who had gone out looking for her after piecing together the April Fools Killer's identity.

== Cast ==
- Obba Babatundé as Detective Malcolm Combs
- Darrin Henson as Detective Ward
- Aaliyah Franks as Missy Combs
- Daya Vaidya as Eva Hernandez
- Anthony Hixon as Marlin "Scoop" Watkins
- Malik Middleton as Malik Frazier
- Ramses Jimenez as Diego Mendez
- Melanie Reif as DeAnna Price
- Ricardo Prosper as Ace
- Lamorne Morris as Melvin Fox
- G. Lane Hillman as Adam
- Ricardo Gamboa as Kid #1
- Peter E. Pohlhammer as Grimm
- Dane Campbell as Raheim
- John Norman as Desk Sergeant
- Sheila Bland as Reporter #1
- Chavez Ravine as Mrs. Watkins
- Wilson Cain II as Albert
- Tomica S. Jenkins as Mrs. Johnson
- Lanre Idewu as School Counselor
- Lil' Flip as himself

== Reception ==
Black Horror Movies wrote, "You have to love April Fools. Otherwise, you might end up blowing your brains out. What feels like a film with production values above typical 'urban horror' fare turns out to be frustratingly devoid of quality. But where quality is lacking, camp appeal reigns supreme, and if camp is April Fools' ultimate goal, it's downright brilliant. This is a perfect storm of incompetence on all fronts: acting, writing, direction, editing, continuity, special effects, and basic human decency."

Film Critics United said, "The young actors struggle with their lines, the story – though liberally stolen – stole only the worthless parts of movies that weren't that good anyway, the ending was completely outlandish, the camera work was spotty at best, and it wasn't scary. In fact it was quite funny."
