= Silent Scream (2005 film) =

- DVD box cover
- Directed by: Matt Cantu; Lance Kawas
- Written by: Bob Brown; Matt Cantu; Lance Kawas
- Produced by: Bob Brown
- Starring: Melissa Schuman; Scott Vickaryous; Shanti Lowry; Tobiasz Daszkiewicz; Thomas Zellen; Michael McKiddy; Walter Harris
- Cinematography: Anthony 'Spike' Simms
- Edited by: Jim O'Donnell
- Music by: Drew Fezzey; Scott Santos
- Release date: October 28, 2005 (Chicago Horror Film Festival)
- Running time: 90 minutes
- Country: United States
- Language: English

Silent Scream (originally known as The Retreat) is a 2005 American independent slasher film directed by Matt Cantu and Lance Kawas and starring Scott Vickaryous, Melissa Schuman and Shanti Lowry. It premiered at the Chicago Horror Film Festival on 28 October 2005 and was released on DVD on 5 December 2006.

== Synopsis ==
A group of college students head out to a cottage in the woods for a long weekend vacation. Not long after arriving, several of the teens wander off into the woods and disappear. More students arrive the next day. They find the mutilated remains of their friends buried in the snow. It seems someone in the woods is out to get them. The remaining teens try to escape, but one by one, the mysterious "figure" hunts them down. The Figure is a slasher-type character who is stalking the group of teens before they even arrive at the cottage. The Figure is a strong fighter and extremely resilient. He seems to be stronger than all of the teens. He also seems impossible to kill. Throughout the movie, he is shot, stabbed, beaten with a stick and hit by a truck but keeps coming back in perfect health. In addition, he is very resourceful. He sets up traps in the woods and uses guns, axes, knives, tools, chains and even wire hangers to butcher the teens. Once they arrive at the cottage, the Figure begins hunting down the teens in the most gruesome and brutal ways. For a short time, the teens suspect that one of them may be the Figure.

== Cast ==
Actor	Role
Melissa Schuman	Nicole
Scott Vickaryous	Mark
Shanti Lowry	Chloe
Michael McKiddy	Brad
Walter Harris	Steve
Carey Shawn	Amy
Roger Bergeron	Derrick
Mike Kinney	Richard
Cheryl Campbell	Marla
Ed Kelly	Sheriff Bruce
Peter Carey	Professor Barren
