= Eric Pete =

American author

Eric Pete is an American author of novels and short stories.

He was born in Seattle, Washington, at University of Washington hospital. He is a graduate of McNeese State University and a U.S. Army veteran. He is a member of Delta Sigma Pi, professional business fraternity. He currently resides in Texas.

== Bibliography ==
His full-length works include the following:

- Real for Me
- Someone's In the Kitchen
- Gets No Love (Dallas Morning News best seller; Editor's pick, Black Expressions book club)
- Don't Get It Twisted (Essence Magazine best seller)
- Lady Sings the Cruels (Dallas Morning News best seller)
- Blow Your Mind (Editor's pick, Black Expressions book club)
- Sticks and Stones
- Reality Check
- Crushed Ice
- Piano In the Dark
- Frostbite
- A Cold Hard Truth
- The Family Business
- To Paris With Love: A Family Business Novel
- Grand Opening: A Family Business Novel

He collaborated with New York Times bestselling author Carl Weber for the Family Business trilogy, the first of which is The New York Times and USA Today bestseller aptly titled The Family Business. Their second collaboration is To Paris With Love. Their third collaboration is Grand Opening.

Eric's novella titled "Oops! I Did It Again" is included in Full Figured 6, which he wrote with Electa Rome Parks.

He has also contributed short stories to the following anthologies: After Hours: A Collection of Erotic Writing by Black Men, Twilight Moods, and On The Line.

Pete is featured in Who's Who in America (2003–present) as well as Who's Who in the World (2008–present).
