= Practically Perfect (Dexter) =

- Dexter episode
- Episode no.: Season 5 Episode 3
- Directed by: Ernest Dickerson
- Written by: Manny Coto
- Cinematography by: Romeo Tirone
- Editing by: David Latham
- Original release date: October 10, 2010
- Running time: 49 minutes

Guest appearances
- Julia Stiles as Lumen Pierce (special guest star); Maria Doyle Kennedy as Sonya; Shawn Hatosy as Boyd Fowler; April Lee Hernández as Cira Manzon; Raphael Sbarge as Jim McCourt; Vanessa Bell Calloway as Crisis Counselor

Episode chronology
← Previous "Hello, Bandit"	Next → "Beauty and the Beast"
- Dexter season 5

"Practically Perfect" is the third episode of the fifth season of the American crime drama television series Dexter. It is the 51st overall episode of the series and was written by executive producer Manny Coto, and was directed by Ernest Dickerson. It originally aired on Showtime on October 10, 2010.

Set in Miami, the series centers on Dexter Morgan, a forensic technician specializing in bloodstain pattern analysis for the fictional Miami Metro Police Department, who leads a secret parallel life as a vigilante serial killer, hunting down murderers who have not been adequately punished by the justice system due to corruption or legal technicalities. In the episode, Dexter targets Boyd Fowler, while Debra continues investigating the Santa Muerte murders.

According to Nielsen Media Research, the episode was seen by an estimated 1.86 million household viewers and gained a 0.9/2 ratings share among adults aged 18–49. The episode received positive reviews from critics, who praised the ending.

== Plot ==
Dexter (Michael C. Hall) hires a woman named Sonya (Maria Doyle Kennedy) to babysit Harrison. With this, he can now stalk Boyd Fowler (Shawn Hatosy), convincing him in giving him a job in sanitation. He also attends counseling with Harrison, where he is assured Harrison will not remember Rita's murder.

Miami Metro continues the investigation into the Santa Muerte cult murder. The suspicion is that the husband killed his wife before committing suicide, but Debra (Jennifer Carpenter) is unsure. She works with Cira (April Lee Hernández) on the case, but the neighborhood is not cooperative. They question the owner of a store that sells the Santa Muerte items found at the scene, and he provides a few leads. When they later return, they find that he has been beheaded, possibly for talking with the police. Masuka (C. S. Lee) notes that the owner was killed in a similar way to the beheaded woman.

Dexter befriends Boyd and accompanies him during his tasks. He then sets up a dead alligator call, using the opportunity to sedate him. However, Boyd also uses the opportunity to shoot him with a tranquilizer, causing both of them to lose consciousness. An ambulance picks them up, with Boyd lying to protect himself. At the hospital, he prepares to kill Dexter, but discovers that he already left. Quinn (Desmond Harrington) continues investigating the identity of Kyle Butler, suspecting that it might match Dexter's description. He considers contacting Arthur's family to identify him, but fears he could lose his career if something goes awry.

Angel (David Zayas) confides in LaGuerta (Lauren Vélez) that he punched an officer the previous night after he disrespected her. Later, Jim McCourt (Raphael Sbarge), an IA investigator, tells LaGuerta that Angel will be charged as the officer had to be hospitalized. When Boyd returns home, Dexter successfully sedates him. As he did not have the kill room ready, he is forced to do it in Boyd's house. After killing him, he notices that someone was watching him from Boyd's locked attic. He opens the door, discovering a woman (Julia Stiles) kept hostage. As he holds her, the woman collapses.

== Production ==
=== Development ===
The episode was written by executive producer Manny Coto, and was directed by Ernest Dickerson. This was Coto's first writing credit, and Dickerson's third directing credit.

== Reception ==
=== Viewers ===
In its original American broadcast, "Practically Perfect" was seen by an estimated 1.86 million household viewers with a 0.9/2 in the 18–49 demographics. This means that 0.9 percent of all households with televisions watched the episode, while 2 percent of all of those watching television at the time of the broadcast watched it. This was a 9% increase in viewership from the previous episode, which was watched by an estimated 1.70 million household viewers with a 0.8/2 in the 18–49 demographics.

=== Critical reviews ===
"Practically Perfect" received positive reviews from critics. Matt Fowler of IGN gave the episode a "great" 8.5 out of 10, and wrote, "After a couple of underwhelming, yet thoughtful, episodes, Dexter kicked things into high gear this week with "Practically Perfect," which offered not one, but two intense "holy @#$%" moments."

Emily St. James of The A.V. Club gave the episode a "B" grade and wrote, "there's a whole buncha stupid crammed into the first half of "Practically Perfect," but the latter half – and in particular everything from when Boyd hits Dexter with the tranquilizer dart on – is crammed with good moments. And it's all because the writers are building toward their big twist for the season, a twist that's kinda sorta spoiled by just having a certain guest star in the opening credits."

Lizzy Goodman of Vulture wrote, "When the episode began, Dexter's biggest immediate problem was finding a nanny for Harrison, by the end he's got a witness on his hands. And not one he can just dispense with. This woman, whose name we don't yet know, is exactly the kind of person Dexter kills to protect. But now that she knows his secret, can he afford to keep her alive?" Sandra Gonzalez of Entertainment Weekly wrote, "It was Dexter's messiest work to date. In fact, as some of you pointed out last week, he's been sloppy in many regards - from touching surfaces sans gloves to having trouble talking his way out of situations. And this week, we saw just what can happen when you try to go back to work before you're ready. Perhaps Dexter should have waited until he returned to his day job before jumping back into his night one. Because now we have a problem. A problem in the form of Julia Stiles."

Billy Grifter of Den of Geek wrote, "Very much like last season, the writers are projecting Dexter on a very narrow path, where he's continually on the verge of either being revealed or suffering complication overload. They repeatedly ask the audience to confront the moral dilemmas and choices that confront Dexter, confident that the majority of people just wouldn't know what to do in these circumstances." Gina DiNunno of TV Guide wrote, "Dexter finds a nanny for Harrison and is worried his son will be affected because he witnessed his mother's murder. Meanwhile, the team deals with a murder tied to a cult-related decapitation."

Claire Zulkey of Los Angeles Times wrote, "Two things in tonight's episode exemplified why I love Dexter. One, the little jokes that Dexter seems more comfortable cracking now: I understand he had to mourn his wife and all, but I don't think I would care nearly as much about the series if it weren't for the dark humor. And the other is that this is a show where a serial decapitator is running through Miami and it's perhaps the third-most interesting thing going on in the show. Maybe I'm a little bloodthirsty." Television Without Pity gave the episode a "B" grade.
