= Love Don't Cost a Thing (film) =

Love Don't Co$t a Thing
- Theatrical release poster
- Directed by: Troy Byer
- Written by: Troy Byer; Michael Swerdlick
- Based on: Can't Buy Me Love by Michael Swerdlick
- Produced by: Andrew Kosove; Broderick Johnson; Mark Burg; Reuben Cannon
- Starring: Nick Cannon; Christina Milian; Kenan Thompson; Kal Penn; Steve Harvey
- Cinematography: Chuck Cohen
- Edited by: David Codron
- Music by: Richard Gibbs
- Production company: Alcon Entertainment
- Distributed by: Warner Bros. Pictures
- Release date: December 12, 2003
- Running time: 101 minutes
- Country: United States
- Language: English
- Box office: $21 million

Love Don't Cost a Thing (stylized as Love Don't Co$t a Thing) is a 2003 American teen comedy film written and directed by Troy Byer and starring Nick Cannon and Christina Milian. It also stars Steve Harvey, Kenan Thompson and Kal Penn. The film is a remake of the 1987 film Can't Buy Me Love and takes on its title from the Jennifer Lopez song of the same name.

== Plot ==
Alvin Johnson is an extremely intelligent nerd who is skilled in designing car engines. He has also taken up a job as a pool cleaner, to raise money to buy a camshaft, a part needed to build an engine for a scholarship project that will ensure him a full ride to the school of his choice. When Alvin is not working he spends his time hanging out with his friends rebuilding a car. Realizing that he and his friends are on the verge of graduating high school, Alvin grows frustrated with the lack of memories he created for himself over the last four years, mad that he and his friends settled for less when the more popular kids, including Paris Morgan, haven't. Alvin has dreamed of dating Paris. When Paris crashes her mother Judy's Escalade during an argument with Dru Hilton, her NBA rookie boyfriend, Alvin agrees to repair the car using the money he had earned for his project, jeopardizing his scholarship opportunity; after a few missteps, Paris eventually pays him back by giving him a $1,500 makeover and agreeing to pretend for two weeks that she's dating Alvin.

Alvin then begins to ingratiate himself with the popular crowd. He and Paris grow closer as she shares with him her secret love of music and he shares with her that he knows how to build car engines. Paris begins to develop feelings for Alvin and at the end of their two-week dating period, she tries to hint that she would like to kiss him. However, Alvin misinterprets her and goes along with their initial plan of a public break up at school.

Even after the break up, Alvin continues to grow in popularity, estranging his former nerdy friends and flirting with Paris' friends. Paris is unhappy to realize how shallow and vapid her friends are, and by extension, Alvin. Tired of him constantly ditching them in favor of the popular kids, Alvin's friends confront him on the matter, during which Alvin's sister Aretha overhears. She comes to realize that Alvin paid Paris to date her seeing how he has nothing of value after his big makeover. She tells their parents, who attempt to talk to Alvin, but he blows them off.

At the end of the year on Senior Ditch Day, Paris asks Alvin to hang out as real friends, but a newly-egotistical Alvin insults her. They argue and storm off from each other. Dru is also at the party to meet up with Paris, but breaks up with her when he finds out she had been "dating" Alvin. In an attempt to win Dru back, Paris reveals the truth about her and Alvin to the whole school, and Alvin is immediately ostracized. While changing to not being popular, Alvin finally realizes he never had the camshaft for his project.

Alvin's father Clarence pays for the camshaft, telling Alvin that they will work out a plan later to pay him back while also explaining to Alvin that he'd supported his sudden transformation because he wanted Alvin to have the same experiences he did while he was in high school, seeing as he was one of the most popular guys at his school. He also admits that he didn't have Alvin's brains nor potential, but he's always been proud of his son. With this confidence restored, Alvin builds an engine with the part his father bought. Alvin's friends push the broken car they had been working on into the garage. They congratulate him on a job well done on completing the engine but are still angry with him for blowing them off. Alvin sees that their car needs a new engine so he installs the one he just built to restore their car, telling them to let him have it sometime within that next week so he can present it to the scholarship committee. Alvin's friends forgive him.

Together, they all attend a school basketball game where Alvin stands up for his nerdy friends against the basketball players. Alvin finally redeems himself in front of everyone and his friends become friendly with the popular crowd. Alvin leaves the gymnasium, and as Paris follows him out, she is stopped by Dru. Paris blows him off and chases after Alvin. They finally kiss and agree to begin a real relationship.

== Cast ==
- Nick Cannon as Alvin "Al" Johnson
- Christina Milian as Paris Morgan, Alvin's love interest
- Kenan Thompson as Walter Colley
- Kal Penn as Kenneth Warman
- Al Thompson as Ted
- Steve Harvey as Clarence Johnson, Alvin's father
- Kevin Christy as Chuck Mattock
- Sam Sarpong as Kadeem
- Russell W. Howard as Anthony
- Nichole Robinson as Yvonne Freeman, Paris' best friend
- Melissa Schuman as Zoe Parks, Paris' other best friend
- Ashley Monique Clark as Aretha Johnson, Alvin's younger sister
- Vanessa Bell Calloway as Vivian Johnson, Alvin's mother
- Gay Thomas Wilson as Judy Morgan, Paris' mother
- Elimu Nelson as Dru Hilton
- Reagan Gomez-Preston as Olivia
- Nicole Scherzinger as Champagne Girl
- Stuart Scott as Himself
- Peter Siragusa as Ben
- Imani Parks as Mia
- Shani Pride as Jasmine
- Dante Basco as Spoken Word Artist
- J.B. Guhman Jr. as JB
- Ian Chidlaw as Eddie
- Mayte Garcia as Dancer

== Production ==
The school scenes were filmed at Long Beach Polytechnic High School in Long Beach, California. The film was shot on October 9, 2002.

== Soundtrack ==
Love Don't Cost a Thing

Soundtrack album by Various artists
- Released: December 9, 2003
- Recorded: 2002–2003
- Genres: Hip hop, R&B
- Label: Hollywood

A soundtrack containing hip-hop music was released on December 9, 2003, by Hollywood Records. It peaked at 22 on the Top R&B/Hip-Hop Albums and 14 on the Top Soundtracks chart. AllMusic rated this soundtrack three stars out of five.

1. "Shorty (Put It on the Floor)"- 4:09 (Busta Rhymes, Chingy, Fat Joe and Nick Cannon)
2. "Luv Me Baby"- 4:27 (Murphy Lee featuring Jazze Pha and Sleepy Brown)
3. "Ignition (Remix)- 3:08 (R. Kelly)
4. "Are You Ready"- 4:13 (Mr. Cheeks)
5. "Got What It Takes"- 3:00 (Jeannie Ortega)
6. "Pass the Courvoisier, Part II"- 4:11 (Busta Rhymes featuring P. Diddy and Pharrell Williams)
7. "Exgirlfriend"- 4:02 (Nivea)
8. "How Far Will You Go"- 3:45 (Ginuwine)
9. "Comes to Light (Everything)"- 4:48 (Jill Scott)
10. "Always"- 4:21 (Melissa Schuman)
11. "Baby Girl"- 4:06 (Joe Budden)
12. "I Wanna Kiss You"- 4:30 (Nicole Wray)
13. "We Rise"- 4:04 (Rama Duke)
14. "Hate 2 Luv U"- 3:29 (3LW)
15. "She Is"- 3:33 (Hous'ton)
16. "Spit da Flow"- 3:32 (Cash Take & B. Griffin)

== Reception ==
=== Box office ===
The film opened at #4 at the American box office raking in $6,315,311 in its first opening weekend behind Stuck on You, The Last Samurai, and Something's Gotta Give.

=== Critical response ===
The film has received mostly negative reviews. On Rotten Tomatoes it has an approval rating of 13% based on reviews from 72 critics. The site's consensus: "A stale, unnecessary remake of Can't Buy Me Love." On Metacritic it has a score of 37% based on reviews from 23 critics.

Roger Ebert, film critic of the Chicago Sun-Times, gave the film a positive three-star rating after giving the original, Can't Buy Me Love, only half a star. Ebert describes the remake as wiser and less cynical than the original and suggests that it might have some insight into the insecurities of high school.

=== Awards and nominations ===
2004 BET Comedy Awards

- Outstanding Directing for a Box Office Movie — Troy Beyer (nominated)

2004 Teen Choice Awards

- Choice Breakout Movie Star, Female — Christina Milian (nominated)
- Choice Movie, Date Movie (nominated)
- Choice Movie Chemistry — Christina Milian, Nick Cannon (nominated)
- Choice Movie Liar — Nick Cannon (nominated)
- Choice Movie Liplock — Christina Milian, Nick Cannon (nominated)
