= Carl Weber (author) =

American author, publisher (born 1964)

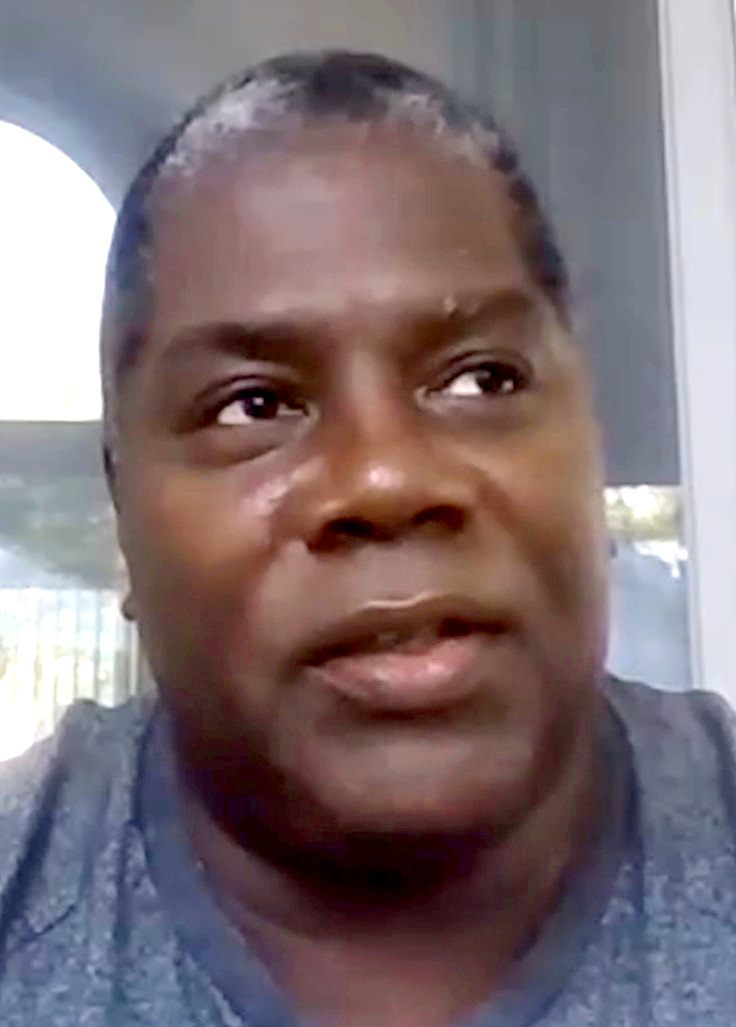
- Weber in 2022
- Born: 1964 (age 61–62); Jamaica, Queens, New York, U.S
- Occupation: Writer
- Years active: 2000–present

Carl Weber (born 1964) is an American author, publisher, television writer and producer. He owns Urban Books, a publishing company, and formerly owned Urban Knowledge, a chain of bookstores. His mystery novels were adapted into films The Man in 3B (2015), The Preacher's Son (2017), The Choir Director (2018) and Influence (2020). Weber created and produced the crime family drama series The Family Business (2018–present) based on his book series. In 2022, he created the crime drama series The Black Hamptons.

== Life and career ==
Weber is from Jamaica, Queens, New York. He attended Virginia State University, where he received a B.S., and the University of Virginia, where he received an MBA.

He published his first book, Lookin' for Luv, in 2000. Man on the Run was a Library Journal pick of the month; So You Call Yourself a Man was a Library Journal bestseller.

His The Family Business series was made into a television series on BET. The first season aired in 2018. A second season set to air in 2020 was announced in 2019. Weber's novel Influence was adapted for BET Plus.

== Selected works ==
- Lookin' for Luv. Dafina, 2000. ISBN 9781575666952
- Married Men. Dafina, 2001.
- Baby Momma Drama. Kensington/Dafina, 2003
- Player Haters. Kensington/Dafina, 2004.
- The Preacher's Son. Kensington/Dafina, 2005.
- So You Call Yourself a Man. Kensington/Dafina, 2006.
- She Ain't the One. Dafina, 2006.
- Something on the Side. Kensington/Dafina, 2008.
- Up to No Good. Kensington/Dafina, 2009.
- Big Girls Do Cry. Dafina Books, 2010.
- Torn between Two Lovers. Kensington/Dafina, 2010.
- Choir Director. Kensington/Dafina, 2011.
- The Man in 3B. Grand Central, 2013.
- Man on the Run. Grand Central Publishing, 2017.
- Influence. Urban Books, 2018. ISBN 9781945855078

=== The Family Business series ===
- The Family Business. With Eric Pete. Urban Books, 2012. ISBN 9781601624673
- The Family Business 2. With Treasure Hernandez] Urban Books, 2013. ISBN 9781601625595
- The Family Business 3: The Return of Vegas. With Treasure Hernandez. Urban Books, 2014. ISBN 9781601626356
- The Family Business 4. With C.N. Phillips. Urban Books, 2018. ISBN 9781622867660
