= Urban Books =

Urban Books is a book publisher specializing in African-American topics, founded by author and publisher Carl Weber in 2002.

== Imprints ==
- Urban Soul (women's fiction, a joint venture with Kensington Books)
- Urban Renaissance Books (2010)
- Urban Christian Books (2007)
