= List of Fresh Off the Boat characters =

The following is a list of cast members and characters that are central to the ABC sitcom Fresh Off the Boat. The series ran from February 4, 2015, through February 21, 2020, spanning six seasons. The series' first season takes place sometime in 1995, and the final season concludes in the year 2000. It was the first sitcom in more than 20 years to feature an Asian American cast, and the first-ever series with an Asian American main cast to surpass 100 episodes.

== Cast by season ==
Actor	Character	Seasons					
Actor	Character	1	2	3	4	5	6
Randall Park	Louis Huang	Main	Main	Main	Main	Main	Main
Constance Wu	Jessica Huang	Main	Main	Main	Main	Main	Main
Hudson Yang	Eddie Huang	Main	Main	Main	Main	Main	Main
Himself	Eddie Huang	Narrator					
Forrest Wheeler	Emery Huang	Main	Main	Main	Main	Main	Main
Ian Chen	Evan Huang	Main	Main	Main	Main	Main	Main
Lucille Soong	Grandma "Jenny" Huang	Recurring	Main	Main	Main	Main	Main
Chelsey Crisp	Honey Ellis	Recurring	Main	Main	Main	Main	Main
Ray Wise	Marvin Ellis	Recurring	Recurring	Main (Note: Credited only in the episodes the actor appears season.)	Main	Main	Main

== Main cast ==
- Randall Park as Louis Huang, the father of Eddie, Emery, and Evan, and husband of Jessica. He is nice and mild-mannered and embraces all things American, which is often seen when he recounts his younger days. He owns a Western steakhouse restaurant in Orlando named Cattleman's Ranch. In season six, he starts a side job as a small business consultant.
- Constance Wu as Jessica Huang, the wife of Louis and mother of Eddie, Emery, and Evan. She is a no-nonsense, pragmatic and highly competitive woman who believes in tough love. She often pushes her sons and husband to be more successful and also keep in touch with their Taiwanese heritage. She is a homemaker for the first four seasons, and becomes an author in season five. When her first book is unsuccessful, she decides to go back to college and seek a career in education.
- Hudson Yang as Edwyn "Eddie" Huang, a die-hard hip-hop and rap fan as well as a great fan of basketball. The show follows his journey from his preteen years to his senior year of high school. The oldest of three brothers, he eschews Taiwanese culture and is more rebellious than his younger siblings, which makes him a frequent target of his mother Jessica's complaints. While working in his father's steakhouse, he displays strong customer service and marketing skills. He is frequently experimenting with various food combinations, and later reveals a desire to attend culinary school instead of a traditional college. This disappoints Jessica, given that Eddie scored 1500 on his S.A.T. test and received some interest from Harvard, but she eventually supports Eddie's decision. (The real-life Eddie Huang serves as an executive producer of the series throughout its run as well as its narrator during the first season.)
- Forrest Wheeler as Emery Huang, the middle son of the Huang family. He is a romantic and lovable kid who is fairly intelligent. He is also depicted as charismatic and mature for his age, and the typical "ladies' man". He is shown to be good at academics as well as athletics, as he thrived in a tennis tournament and was on the school volleyball team in season five. He graduates elementary school at the end of season two and begins high school in season six, during which he becomes interested in acting.
- Ian Chen as Evan Huang, Louis and Jessica's youngest son, who is a star student and obeys the rules. This makes him Jessica's blatant favorite child, as she frequently predicts his future dual career as "Doctor/President". Evan's elementary school allows him to skip fifth grade between seasons three and four, and he starts middle school in the fourth season. Mature beyond his years, Evan is the sergeant-at-arms for the local homeowners association. He is jealous when Eddie scores 1500 on his S.A.T. test without much effort, while he (Evan) has to work hard to achieve everything. In a flash forward during the series finale, Evan is shown graduating from Harvard University in 2008. (This is eight years in the future, as the series concludes in the year 2000.)
- Lucille Soong as Grandma Jenny Huang (main season two through six, recurring season one), Louis's mother, and grandmother of Eddie, Evan, and Emery. Although she clearly understands English, she speaks only in Mandarin (subtitled in English) during the first three-plus seasons. She lives with the family in a converted garage and rarely interacts with the family's affairs, usually just sitting back and making sarcastic comments for her own amusement. In the season four episode "It's a Plastic Pumpkin, Louis Huang", the family discovers she has secretly been taking ESL lessons, and she speaks English for the first time. She speaks English more frequently in the final two seasons.
- Chelsey Crisp as Honey Ellis (main seasons two through six, recurring season one), the Huangs' next-door neighbor and Marvin's third wife. She and Jessica bond over their mutual dislike for the more pretentious women in the neighborhood, eventually becoming best friends. Although Honey is friendly with Jessica, she is often intimidated by Jessica's competitive nature. She delivers her first child, a daughter named Maria, in the season five premiere. She becomes pregnant again soon after Maria is delivered, and has a second child less than a year later.
- Ray Wise as Marvin Ellis (main seasons three through six, recurring seasons one and two), Honey's much-older husband and Nicole's father. He is a successful dentist who married Honey after his previous (second) wife caught him cheating with Honey on the kitchen floor. He is kind and friendly with the Huang family, though he occasionally gets into a friendly rivalry with Louis.

== Recurring cast ==
- Eddie Huang as Adult Eddie Huang (voice only), the narrator for the first season.
- Trevor Larcom as Trent, one of Eddie's group of school friends who becomes Eddie's closest male friend. The character takes on a more prominent role when he begins working for Louis at Cattleman's. He has multiple sisters, including Tina, who takes a liking to Eddie.
- Evan Hannemann as Barefoot Dave, one of Eddie's group of school friends. His parents are divorced and he lives with his mother, who has a lax parenting style.
- Prophet Bolden as Walter, one of Eddie's group of school friends and one of the few African-American kids in school.
- Dash Williams as Brian, one of Eddie's group of school friends who is constantly teased for his short stature.
- Luna Blaise as Nicole, Marvin's daughter and Honey's stepdaughter. Though two years older and more popular, Nicole befriends Eddie and helps him integrate into his new school. In return, Eddie is supportive when Nicole comes out as lesbian. At the beginning of season five, she moves to New York for a college prep program.
- Rachel Cannon as Deidre, one of the neighborhood women and president of the homeowners association who is frequently a thorn in Jessica's side.
- Stacey Scowley as Carol-Joan, one of the neighborhood women.
- Colleen Ryan as Amanda, one of the neighborhood women.
- David Goldman as Principal Hunter, the principal at Eddie's middle school.
- Paul Scheer as Mitch, one of Louis’ employees at Cattleman's. He is one of the first employees shown, working as the host of the restaurant before Louis bought it.
- Jillian Armenante as Nancy, one of Louis’ employees at Cattleman's as a waitress. Her recurring trait is her incompetence.
- Noel Gugliemi (credited as Noel G.) as Hector Martinez, a chef at Cattleman's briefly deported because he was undocumented until he was brought back later. Gugliemi reprises the role from the Fast & Furious franchise.
- Isabella Alexander as Alison, Eddie's first girlfriend. They break up in season four, after which Alison becomes Evan's platonic friend, creating an uncomfortable situation for Eddie. Audrey (played by Ashley Liao), Alison's friend, came to the Huang's household to pretend to be Alison in Season 2 Episode 23 "The Manchurian Dinner Date".
- Alex Quijano as Officer Bryson (later Corporal Bryson), a local police officer who is occasionally interjected into the Huang's lives.
- Matt Oberg as Matthew Chestnut, the manager that Louis hires for his restaurant. He quits in season four, only to return in season six, divorced and needing a job.
- Angela Kinsey as Amy Chestnut, Matthew's wife whom he divorces off-screen prior to season six.
- Kimberly Crandall as Lisa, Trent's mother.
- Isabel Oliver Marcus as Tina, Trent's sister who becomes Eddie's girlfriend. She is shown to be very headstrong and often pushes Eddie to be better, which earns her Jessica's respect.
- Ken Marino as Gus, co-host of a local Orlando morning talk show.
- Kathleen Rose Perkins as Mey-Mey, co-host of a local Orlando morning talk show.
- Susan Park as Connie Chen, Jessica's sister with whom she has a longstanding rivalry. She has a son Justin who is also Eddie, Emery and Evan's cousin.
- Nick Gore as Ned, Eddie's classmate who is not in Eddie's circle of friends. He is usually the messenger to Eddie's friends.
- Luke Judy as Zack, Evan's friend since season three.
- Marlowe Peyton as Reba, Eddie's classmate who is obsessed with Eddie.
