= Fresh Off the Boat season 1 =

Fresh Off the Boat
- Season 1
- Starring: Randall Park; Constance Wu; Hudson Yang; Forrest Wheeler; Ian Chen
- No. of episodes: 13

Release
- Original network: ABC
- Original release: February 4 – April 21, 2015

Season chronology
- Next → Season 2

The first season of Fresh Off the Boat, an American sitcom created by Nahnatchka Khan and produced by 20th Century Fox Television, premiered in the United States on ABC on February 4, 2015, and concluded on April 21, 2015. The season consisted of 13 episodes.

The series focuses on the life of a Taiwanese-American family in Florida in the 1990s. The first season stars Randall Park, Constance Wu, Hudson Yang, Forrest Wheeler and Ian Chen. With Lucille Soong, Chelsey Crisp and Ray Wise in supporting roles.

== Cast and characters ==
=== Main ===
- Randall Park as Louis Huang
- Constance Wu as Jessica Huang
- Hudson Yang as Edwyn "Eddie" Huang
- Forrest Wheeler as Emery Huang
- Ian Chen as Evan Huang,

=== Recurring ===
- Lucille Soong as Jenny Huang
- Chelsey Crisp as Honey Ellis
- Ray Wise as Marvin Ellis
- Eddie Huang as himself (voice only)
- Trevor Larcom as Trent
- Evan Hannemann as Barefoot Dave
- Prophet Bolden as Walter
- Dash Williams as Brian
- Luna Blaise as Nicole
- Rachel Cannon as Dierdre
- Stacey Scowley as Carol-Joan
- Colleen Ryan as Amanda
- David Goldman as Principal Hunter
- Paul Scheer as Mitch
- Jillian Armenante as Nancy
- Noel Gugliemi (credited as Noel G.) as Hector Martinez

== Episodes ==
No. overall	No. in season	Title	Directed by	Written by	Original release date	Prod. code	US viewers (millions)
1	1	"Pilot"	Lynn Shelton	Nahnatchka Khan	February 4, 2015	1AXT01	7.94
In 1995, Eddie Huang's family moves from D.C. to Orlando when his father Louis assumes control of a failing steakhouse, certain that he can turn around its fortunes. Jessica is confused by the rituals and habits of her new neighbors. Eddie finds it difficult to fit in at school, while Emery seems to be doing just fine.
2	2	"Home Sweet Home-School"	Max Winkler	Kourtney Kang	February 4, 2015	1AXT03	7.47
When Eddie gets high marks in school, Jessica reacts by thinking that the schoolwork is not challenging enough. She tries to get him moved into gifted programs but the school does not have them. She then considers enrolling them in a Chinese Learning Center (CLC), but there are none in the area. Wanting to get Jessica and her incessant micromanaging away from the restaurant, Louis convinces her to home-school the boys. When she finds out that Louis is keeping her away from the restaurant in order to relax the strict regime she has implemented there, she brings the boys there so that she can teach and keep watch over the restaurant.
3	3	"The Shunning"	Jake Kasdan	Nahnatchka Khan	February 10, 2015	1AXT02	6.05
Jessica finally makes a new friend she likes named Honey (Chelsey Crisp), only to discover that the other neighborhood women dislike her for breaking up her husband's previous marriage. To gain more popularity after not being able to have Jordans like the other kids at school, Eddie figures showing off a hot girl like Honey to them will make him more popular instead. Louis uses a neighborhood block party to shamelessly promote the restaurant.
4	4	"Success Perm"	Gail Mancuso	Rich Blomquist	February 10, 2015	1AXT04	5.86
Jessica's sister Connie (Susan Park), her husband and Louis' old boss Steve (C. S. Lee), and Jessica's mother (Shu Lan Tuan) visit the family. As they arrive in Orlando, Louis and Jessica have tried to make their house and the restaurant look better than they are - so that successful Steve, snotty Connie, and penny-pinching Grandma Chu will think they are successful as well. Eddie is excited about seeing his cousin who introduced him to hip hop, Justin (Lance Lim) - but Justin is now very depressing to be around now that he is a fan of grunge music instead.
5	5	"Persistent Romeo"	Lynn Shelton	Sanjay Shah	February 17, 2015	1AXT05	6.17
Jessica requests that Louis has a sexual harassment seminar for the restaurant, but ends up making the employees feel harassed. Eddie tries to impress the kids in his school by showing them a 'dirty movie' which is actually Louis' sexual harassment video for the restaurant.
6	6	"Fajita Man"	Matt Sohn	Matt Kuhn	February 24, 2015	1AXT06	5.79
As Jessica searches for a job for herself, Eddie starts working at the Cattleman's Ranch to get enough money for a video game he wants.
7	7	"Showdown at the Golden Saddle"	Lynn Shelton	Keith Heisler	March 3, 2015	1AXT07	6.02
Jessica finds out the truth about the Cattleman's Ranch and Golden Saddle, while Eddie tries his best to catch Nicole's attention.
8	8	"Phillip Goldstein"	Phil Traill	Jeff Chiang & Eric Ziobrowski	March 10, 2015	1AXT08	5.08
A Chinese Jewish-American boy named Philip Goldstein (Albert Tsai), is the new student at Eddie's school and they are paired up in all activities because of their race, even though Eddie does not like Philip and vice-versa. Jessica, however, immediately likes Philip because he is academically successful, plays the cello and is a "good Chinese boy". Philip and Eddie make a deal that if Eddie takes Philip to see "Les Misérables" Philip will go along with Eddie to the Beastie Boys concert. Eventually Philip abandons Eddie and Eddie has to miss the concert looking for him, which Jessica tells him off for. She ends up taking Eddie to the concert the next day to make it up to him, and does not like it.
9	9	"License to Sell"	Alisa Statman	Camilla Blackett	March 24, 2015	1AXT09	4.92
Jessica goes in to take her realtor exam only to meet the best realtor in the city. Afraid that she will never be the best, as she often tells her children, "Always be the best", she instead lies about passing the test. Her husband eventually discovers this and tells her that she should never give up, and she then eventually takes and passes the exam. Eddie attempts to use his father's advice in trying to get Nicole to like him.
10	10	"Blind Spot"	Claire Scanlon	David Smithyman	March 31, 2015	1AXT10	4.83
Jessica's college boyfriend Oscar Chow (Rex Lee) visits the Huangs. Jessica wants Louis to be jealous of Oscar, but Louis is not because although Jessica does not see it, Louis knows that Oscar is gay. Things get even weirder when Oscar reveals that in college he thought he and Louis were dating, not he and Jessica. Meanwhile, the chicken pox is going around.
11	11	"Very Superstitious"	Alex Hardcastle	Ali Wong	April 7, 2015	1AXT11	4.85
Eddie slips on a rug at the steakhouse and breaks his arm. Later, he catches his father lying to Jessica, and Louis responds by saying little white lies are okay if some good can come of it. Taking this to heart, Eddie tries to gain favor in a student council election at school by making up a story about how he hurt his arm. This results in social services visiting the Huang home. Scottie Pippen makes a cameo appearance.
12	12	"Dribbling Tiger, Bounce Pass Dragon"	Robert Cohen	Rich Blomquist	April 14, 2015	1AXT12	4.76
Louis becomes the coach for Eddie's basketball team. In the show's tag, the family is eagerly watching a scene from the pilot of Margaret Cho's sitcom, All-American Girl.
13	13	"So Chineez"	Chris Koch	Sanjay Shah	April 21, 2015	1AXT13	5.08
For a country project at their school, Eddie is assigned Iceland but all of his friends switch to the Caribbean islands because they are an easy A. Eddie then switches with somebody for Jamaica by bribing him with Topanga's phone number since he likes Boy Meets World. Later, Jessica wants the boys to remember their Chinese heritage and switches Eddie to China. Eddie wants to switch back to Jamaica but defends China after one of his friends says that China is nothing but pandas. He ends up getting an F because he was so busy defending China that he forgets to do his Jamaica project.

== Ratings ==
No.	Title	Air date	Rating/share (18–49)	Viewers (million)	DVR (18–49)	DVR viewers (million)	Total (18–49)	Total viewers (million)
1	"Pilot"	February 4, 2015	2.5/8	7.94	0.9	2.07	3.4	10.03
2	"Home Sweet Home-School"	February 4, 2015	2.3/7	7.47	—N/a	—N/a	—N/a	—N/a
3	"The Shunning"	February 10, 2015	1.7/6	6.05	—N/a	—N/a	—N/a	—N/a
4	"Success Perm"	February 10, 2015	1.8/6	5.86	—N/a	—N/a	—N/a	—N/a
5	"Persistent Romeo"	February 17, 2015	1.9/6	6.17	—N/a	—N/a	—N/a	—N/a
6	"Fajita Man"	February 24, 2015	1.8/6	5.79	—N/a	—N/a	—N/a	—N/a
7	"Showdown at the Golden Saddle"	March 3, 2015	1.7/6	6.02	—N/a	—N/a	—N/a	—N/a
8	"Phillip Goldstein"	March 10, 2015	1.6/6	5.08	0.9	—N/a	2.5	—N/a
9	"License to Sell"	March 24, 2015	1.4/5	4.92	0.6	—N/a	2.0	—N/a
10	"Blind Spot"	March 31, 2015	1.3/5	4.83	0.8	—N/a	2.1	—N/a
11	"Very Superstitious"	April 7, 2015	1.4/5	4.85	—N/a	—N/a	—N/a	—N/a
12	"Dribbling Tiger, Bounce Pass Dragon"	April 14, 2015	1.5/5	4.76	—N/a	—N/a	—N/a	—N/a
13	"So Chineez"	April 21, 2015	1.5/5	5.08	—N/a	—N/a	—N/a	—N/a
