= Fresh Off the Boat season 2 =

Fresh Off the Boat
- Season 2
- Starring: Randall Park; Constance Wu; Hudson Yang; Forrest Wheeler; Ian Chen; Lucille Soong; Chelsey Crisp
- No. of episodes: 24

Release
- Original network: ABC
- Original release: September 22, 2015 – May 24, 2016

Season chronology
- ← Previous; Season 1 Next → Season 3

The second season of Fresh Off the Boat, an American sitcom created by Nahnatchka Khan and produced by 20th Century Fox Television, premiered in the United States on ABC on September 22, 2015, and concluded on May 24, 2016. The season consisted of 24 episodes.

The series focuses on the life of a Taiwanese-American family in Florida in the 1990s. The second season stars Randall Park, Constance Wu, Hudson Yang, Forrest Wheeler, Ian Chen, Lucille Soong, and Chelsey Crisp with Ray Wise and Isabella Alexander in supporting roles.

== Cast and characters ==
=== Main ===
- Randall Park as Louis Huang
- Constance Wu as Jessica Huang
- Hudson Yang as Edwyn "Eddie" Huang
- Forrest Wheeler as Emery Huang
- Ian Chen as Evan Huang,
- Lucille Soong as Jenny Huang
- Chelsey Crisp as Honey Ellis

=== Recurring ===
- Ray Wise as Marvin Ellis
- Trevor Larcom as Trent
- Evan Hannemann as Barefoot Dave
- Prophet Bolden as Walter
- Dash Williams as Brian
- Luna Blaise as Nicole
- Rachel Cannon as Dierdre
- Stacey Scowley as Carol-Joan
- Colleen Ryan as Amanda
- David Goldman as Principal Hunter
- Paul Scheer as Mitch
- Jillian Armenante as Nancy
- Noel Gugliemi (credited as Noel G.) as Hector Martinez
- Isabella Alexander as Allison

== Episodes ==
No. overall	No. in season	Title	Directed by	Written by	Original release date	Prod. code	US viewers (millions)
14	1	"Family Business Trip"	Lynn Shelton	Nahnatchka Khan	September 22, 2015	2AXT01	6.05
As summer vacation winds down, Louis has to take a business trip to attend the National Franchisee Convention, while the family tags along and goes to Gator World nearby. Eddie, not wanting to be an outcast in the 7th grade, sees the trip as an opportunity to have an impressive story to tell. As Evan loses another tooth, he realizes that he is growing up and loses the advantages of being little. While on the trip, Jessica refuses to relax and aims to get her money's worth. Guest starring: Rob Riggle as Gator Dan and Ed Lover as himself.
15	2	"Boy II Man"	Claire Scanlon	Matt Kuhn	September 29, 2015	2AXT02	4.74
Nicole has to repeat eighth grade, much to the delight of Eddie and the other seventh graders, whom she protects from the current eighth graders she harassed the year before. Jessica insists that Eddie take a piccolo class for his elective hour, noting that thousands of college band scholarships go unfilled every year. But when Eddie learns that he can tutor Nicole during that same hour, he shuns his mom's request, forcing her to use a different tactic to get her way. Meanwhile, Nicole's dad inspires Louis to try and convince Jessica that they should have a daughter. Guest starring: Matt Lucas as Mr. Fisher.
16	3	"Shaquille O'Neal Motors"	Lynn Shelton	Keith Heisler	October 6, 2015	2AXT03	4.85
The Huangs are in desperate need of a second vehicle, and Louis takes Jessica along to Shaquille O'Neal Motors, given that she negotiated the deal for their current minivan. But Jessica confesses she did not get the best deal she could then because she forgot to request floor mats, and she doubts her negotiating abilities. Meanwhile, Eddie convinces Evan to sell his Beanie Baby collection so he and his brothers can buy a backyard water slide. Guest starring: Shaquille O'Neal as himself.
17	4	"The Fall Ball"	Tristram Shapeero	Jeff Chiang	October 13, 2015	2AXT04	3.96
Based on his love for the movie Pretty in Pink, Louis goes overboard preparing Eddie for the Fall Ball dance at school. Eddie is initially confident about asking his crush Alison to dance, but chickens out and stays home after Louis says the first school dance is a "life-changing experience". Elsewhere, Jessica learns she can make a lot of money flipping houses and tries to make nice with Grandma Huang after finding out she will be coming into some money. Guest starring: Jeremy Lin.
18	5	"Miracle on Dead Street"	Bill Purple	Eric Ziobrowski	October 27, 2015	2AXT05	4.07
Louis is excited preparing for Halloween, but gets disappointed when he hears that Eddie and his pals want to trick-or-treat in a more upscale neighborhood. Meanwhile, Jessica tries to protect her new income home from a group of condescending teenage boys who promise to come back at night to egg it.
19	6	"Good Morning Orlando"	Phil Traill	Camilla Blackett	November 3, 2015	2AXT06	4.45
Louis is invited to appear on Good Morning Orlando when the show's hosts see him doing celebrity impersonations at the restaurant. After the appearance, however, Jessica chastises him for perpetuating the stereotype of Asian men only being accepted as clowns. At school, Alison sends Eddie a love note and, soon, Eddie and his four friends are going on a "date" to the mall with Alison and her four friends. But, when one of Eddie's friends makes a mistake about which girl likes him, Eddie questions whether his note really came from Alison or someone else.
20	7	"The Big 1–2"	Lynn Shelton	Rachna Fruchbom	November 10, 2015	2AXT07	3.77
Eddie celebrates his 12th birthday with friends, much to the dismay of Louis and Jessica, who were hoping for a family birthday party. At the same time, Emery and Evan feel left out when their parents are focused on Eddie, so they decide to cause trouble just to get their attention with little to no success.
21	8	"Huangsgiving"	Gail Mancuso	David Smithyman	November 17, 2015	2AXT08	3.90
Jessica is finally able to persuade her mother to let her host Thanksgiving instead of her sister Connie, who has always hosted it. But she and Louis get overly ambitious with the planning and almost everything goes wrong. Meanwhile, Eddie has started listening to some grunge music in order to connect with his cousin Justin, only to learn that Justin is now a diehard ska fan.
22	9	"We Done Son"	Bill Purple	Ali Wong	December 1, 2015	2AXT09	3.66
An argument ensues between Jessica and Honey when Jessica does not want to spend money for a lavish open house at the investment property, but has no qualms about giving several hundred dollars to a psychic to advise her on decisions about the house. Elsewhere, Eddie gets a job so that he can afford a $50 necklace for Alison and is floored to find out he will be working for rapper DMX. Guest starring: DMX as himself.
23	10	"The Real Santa"	Henry Chan	Kourtney Kang	December 8, 2015	2AXT10	3.94
Jessica lies to Evan about Santa Claus, saying he is really a scientist and that delivering presents on Christmas is only Santa's charity work. When Louis hosts a "breakfast with Santa" at the restaurant, however, Jessica has to make up more lies to keep Evan believing. Meanwhile, Eddie and Emery have differing opinions on what will be the perfect Christmas present for their mom.
24	11	"Year of the Rat"	Ken Whittingham	Sheng Wang	February 2, 2016	2AXT13	5.19
The Huangs are excited to go back home to Washington, D.C. for a family celebration of Chinese New Year, but Louis messes up the dates on the plane tickets and they are forced to stay in Orlando. Louis and Jessica look up a local Asian American organization that says they are throwing a party that night, but it ends up being a major disappointment.
25	12	"Love and Loopholes"	Phil Traill	Jeff Chiang	February 9, 2016	2AXT16	4.23
Eddie tries to win two tickets for the Janet Jackson concert in a radio promotion so that he can take Alison for Valentine's Day. Trent helps him call in and, when Trent actually gets through and wins, he insists that he be able to use one of the tickets. Eddie soon comes up with a scheme to get tickets for all three of them. At home, Emery tries to set up a night for Jessica and Louis to be alone and romantic, but is disappointed when they spend the time doing their taxes. Guest starring: Jimmy Jam and Terry Lewis as themselves. Note: This is the first episode where Grandma Huang does not appear. Janet Jackson could not appear in the episode due to her pregnancy at the time but did promote the episode regardless.
26	13	"Phil's Phaves"	Alisa Statman	Rich Blomquist	February 16, 2016	2AXT11	4.64
Louis and Jessica discover the power of the Internet, finding a restaurant review site called "Phil's Phaves" that criticizes the atmosphere at Cattleman's Ranch. The Huangs resolve to make the restaurant more "fun" after getting the reviewer to agree to a return visit, only to find out that it's Phillip Goldstein, the young boy who left Eddie stranded at the Beastie Boys concert. Elsewhere, Eddie's fear of talking to Alison on the phone leads him to make a mix tape for her instead, but the tape falls into the hands of Reba, a nerdy girl who has a crush on Eddie, giving her the wrong idea.
27	14	"Michael Chang Fever"	Bill Purple	Sanjay Shah	February 23, 2016	2AXT12	4.59
Louis and Jessica find out that Emery could potentially be the next Chinese-American star tennis player. They hire tennis legend Billie Jean King to coach Emery and mold him into a star athlete, but soon realize she may be training him too intensely. Meanwhile, Eddie helps Evan deal with what he thinks is a school bully, but it turns out to be something else. Guest starring: Billie Jean King as herself.
28	15	"Keep 'Em Separated"	Jude Weng	Matt Kuhn	March 8, 2016	2AXT15	4.94
Eddie worries when Nichole breaks up with her boyfriend and starts conversing with Alison, because he has never told Alison about the crush he had on Nichole. Eddie then gets mad when Alison mentions she had a crush on his best friend Dave, even though Eddie himself has just planned an ice cream date with Nichole. Meanwhile, Jessica wants Louis to make friends at the local pool hall so that he will stop hanging around her and Honey so much. Her plan backfires, however, when Louis meets and plays pool with a woman named Toni. Guest starring: Angelique Cabral as Toni.
29	16	"Tight Two"	Lynn Shelton	Keith Heisler	March 15, 2016	2AXT14	4.10
Because he is normally used to coming home from work and spending only a few quality minutes with the boys, Louis struggles to entertain them for longer stretches after a leg injury keeps him at home. Meanwhile, Jessica has to take over the restaurant, forcing her to deal with the new carry-out service offered by Cattleman's as well as the employees who know that Louis has forbidden Jessica from firing anyone.
30	17	"Doing it Right"	Christine Gernon	Eric Ziobrowski	March 22, 2016	2AXT17	4.63
Louis prepares his secret-recipe chili for the North Orlando Chili Cook-Off, where he will face five-time winner, Marvin. He asks Eddie to be his apprentice, but Eddie goes rogue and enters the contest himself when Louis will not take any of his suggestions. Elsewhere, Evan is uninvited to his friend's birthday party and Jessica assumes it is because she confronted the boy's mother (Casey Wilson) in the school parking lot. She later learns Evan was dropped from the invite list because he is very bossy, just like his mom.
31	18	"Week in Review"	Claire Scanlon	Kourtney Kang	March 29, 2016	2AXT18	4.63
Louis and Jessica enjoy doing their "week in review" and working as a team to plan their various schedules around those of the boys. But Eddie comes home from school with lice and then gives it to Evan, who gives it to Jessica, causing Louis to stay away from Jessica because he is the important provider for the family. A conversation with the "old school" Marvin, however, makes Louis reconsider how he has treated his wife. Meanwhile, after being unsatisfied with a homework grade, Eddie challenges his teacher to a basketball bet but, due to having lice, Eddie must figure out how to keep up his end of the deal.
32	19	"Jessica Place"	Sean Kavanagh	Abbey Caldwell	April 5, 2016	2AXT19	4.23
Jessica is devastated to learn that her favorite TV show, Melrose Place, has aired its season finale and will not be back until September, but the neighborhood drama easily replaces it as Jessica and Honey discover a juicy secret about Deirdre, allowing Jessica to get back at Deirdre for voting down the Huangs' pool during an HOA meeting. Meanwhile, Louis and Emery find ways to handle negative emotions. Guest starring: Melrose Place's Courtney Thorne-Smith as Anne, a new neighbor.
33	20	"Hi, My Name Is..."	Bill Purple	Rachna Fruchbom	April 26, 2016	2AXT21	4.70
As Evan prepares to open his first bank account and sign his first official document, he agonizes over which name to use: his Chinese name or his American name. He is not satisfied with Jessica's reason for choosing his American name (the nurse who helped deliver him had the last name "Evans"), nor do Jessica's or Louis' stories about how they chose their own American names help. In the end, Grandma Huang convinces Evan that the name he was given is not important; it is what you do in life to make that name important that matters. Guest starring: Jalen Rose as Cool Louis, Busta Rhymes as himself, and Shaquille O'Neal as himself (the President of the United States in Eddie's imaginary future scenario)
34	21	"Rent Day"	Jude Weng	Camilla Blackett	May 3, 2016	2AXT20	4.29
After the flip house is finished and the women face the prospect of barely breaking even on the sale, Jessica persuades Honey and Grandma to rent out the property against their better judgement. Jessica tries to take care of the situation but, as the tenants (John Francis Daley and Allison Scagliotti) become a nuisance, she fears she may be in over her head. Guest starring: Evan Hannemann as Eddie's friend Dave Selby.
35	22	"Gotta Be Me"	Ken Whittingham	David Smithyman	May 10, 2016	2AXT22	3.91
Louis decides to give Emery some pointers to help him become the cool kid at school; Jessica volunteers to chaperone Eddie's field trip to Colonial Floridatowne, showing Eddie that she can be a fun mom.
36	23	"The Manchurian Dinner Date"	Nahnatchka Khan	Rich Blomquist	May 17, 2016	2AXT23	4.23
With Emery graduating elementary school, Louis throws a graduation dinner at Cattleman's and tells each of his boys they can bring a friend. Eddie is excited and nervous to invite his girlfriend Alison and introduce her to his mother; he thinks Jessica will not approve of Alison because she is not Chinese. Alison then devises a plan to make a good impression with Jessica. Meanwhile, Louis tries to help Emery prepare his valedictorian speech, while Grandma attempts to make a new suit for Evan.
37	24	"Bring the Pain"	Bill Purple	Sanjay Shah	May 24, 2016	2AXT24	4.88
Louis' brother Gene comes to visit from Taiwan with big news to share. Having borrowed $200 from Gene many years ago to buy Louis a wedding ring, Jessica tries to find ways to covertly repay Gene, only to learn that Louis has secretly sent Gene thousands of dollars over the years. Meanwhile, Eddie tries to find a way to watch Chris Rock's latest HBO comedy special "Bring the Pain" so that he can discuss it with Alison and their friends, but Emery and Evan block him at every turn on Jessica's orders. Guest starring: Ken Jeong as Gene

== Ratings ==
No.	Title	Air date	Rating/share (18–49)	Viewers (millions)	DVR (18–49)	DVR viewers (millions)	Total (18–49)	Total viewers (millions)
1	"Family Business Trip"	September 22, 2015	1.9/7	6.05	0.7	1.51	2.6	7.56
2	"Boy II Man"	September 29, 2015	1.7/6	4.74	0.7	1.61	2.4	6.35
3	"Shaquille O'Neal Motors"	October 6, 2015	1.8/6	4.85	—N/a	—N/a	—N/a	—N/a
4	"The Fall Ball"	October 13, 2015	1.4/4	3.96	TBA	TBA	TBA	TBA
5	"Miracle on Dead Street"	October 27, 2015	1.5/5	4.07	TBA	TBA	TBA	TBA
6	"Good Morning Orlando"	November 3, 2015	1.6/5	4.45	TBA	TBA	TBA	TBA
7	"The Big 1–2"	November 10, 2015	1.3/4	3.77	TBA	TBA	TBA	TBA
8	"Huangsgiving"	November 17, 2015	1.4/4	3.90	TBA	TBA	TBA	TBA
9	"We Done Son"	December 1, 2015	1.3/4	3.66	0.7	1.48	2.0	5.14
10	"The Real Santa"	December 8, 2015	1.2/4	3.94	0.7	—N/a	1.9	—N/a
11	"Year of the Rat"	February 2, 2016	1.4/5	5.19	—N/a	—N/a	—N/a	—N/a
12	"Love and Loopholes"	February 9, 2016	1.2/4	4.23	—N/a	—N/a	—N/a	—N/a
13	"Phil's Phaves"	February 16, 2016	1.3/4	4.64	—N/a	—N/a	—N/a	—N/a
14	"Michael Chang Fever"	February 23, 2016	1.2/4	4.59	—N/a	—N/a	—N/a	—N/a
15	"Keep 'Em Separated"	March 8, 2016	1.4/5	4.94	—N/a	—N/a	—N/a	—N/a
16	"Tight Two"	March 15, 2016	1.1/4	4.10	—N/a	—N/a	—N/a	—N/a
17	"Doing it Right"	March 22, 2016	1.2/4	4.63	—N/a	—N/a	—N/a	—N/a
18	"Week in Review"	March 29, 2016	1.2/4	4.63	—N/a	—N/a	—N/a	—N/a
19	"Jessica Place"	April 5, 2016	1.1/4	4.23	—N/a	—N/a	—N/a	—N/a
20	"Hi, My Name Is..."	April 26, 2016	1.3/5	4.70	—N/a	—N/a	—N/a	—N/a
21	"Rent Day"	May 3, 2016	1.1/4	4.29	—N/a	—N/a	—N/a	—N/a
22	"Gotta Be Me"	May 10, 2016	0.9/3	3.91	—N/a	—N/a	—N/a	—N/a
23	"The Manchurian Dinner Date"	May 17, 2016	1.1/4	4.23	—N/a	—N/a	—N/a	—N/a
24	"Bring the Pain"	May 24, 2016	1.2/5	4.88	—N/a	—N/a	—N/a	—N/a
