= DEJ Productions =

Defunct American film company

- Company type: Subsidiary
- Industry: Entertainment
- Founded: 1998; 28 years ago
- Defunct: 2006
- Fate: Folded by First Look Pictures
- Headquarters: Los Angeles, United States
- Key people: Dean Wilson; Ed Stead; John Antioco
- Products: Motion pictures Home video
- Owner: Blockbuster LLC (1998–2005); First Look Studios (2005–2006)

DEJ Productions was an American independent film studio, distribution, production and home video company founded in 1998 by Dean Wilson, Ed Stead and John Antioco.

== History ==
The studio distributed 225 films in eight years, including the Academy Award-winning Monster starring Charlize Theron, and the multiple Academy Award-winning Crash which won Best Picture of the Year. DEJ was a film acquisition company which began in 1998, shortly after the introduction of the medium of DVD. The home video industry was undergoing a major economic change and DEJ was established to pick-up low-budget films primarily to get exclusive DVD releases for its parent company, Blockbuster Video. DEJ was named after the first initials of its three executives at the time, its Executive Vice President Dean Wilson, its General Counsel and Executive Vice President of Business Development Ed Stead, and its CEO John Antioco. The company released a few of its acquired films theatrically. A notable example was the U.S. rights to the Sylvester Stallone film D-Tox, which Universal Studios declined to distribute in the U.S. DEJ picked up the film and released it under the title Eye See You, a name it also used in the home video release.

Based in Los Angeles, DEJ picked up around three dozen films annually. Its first film acquired was the home video distribution of Still Breathing, starring Brendan Fraser. It acquired the rights to the biopics of two mass murderers in Dahmer and Gacy. DEJ also picked up films such as Party Monster and Grand Theft Parsons at festivals including the Sundance Film Festival. In the case of a theatrical release such as 2004's My Date With Drew, Blockbuster stores would promote the film both in its store and on its website. Because DEJ was in the Blockbuster corporate umbrella during a period in which Viacom owned Blockbuster, DEJ could also sell the rights to Viacom's cable networks including Starz or Showtime while obtaining video rights to first run titles airing on the cable channels such as Whoopi Goldberg's made-for-Showtime film, Good Fences. In the media industry, this was considered a synergistic business model. One of the founding partners, Dean Wilson, explained DEJ's philosophy on convincing filmmakers of their business model in an interview in 2002. He said, "A lot of filmmakers initially have this belief that they're not a success unless they end up in a theater...They all want to be Spielberg and all want to make tons of money eventually, but I think that in a lot of these early projects, they put everything into it, and I would love to see theatrical release. But I think they're now coming to terms with the fact theatrical release isn't available for everything. We offer up exposure to people, which, when it comes down to it, is really what they want."

Because of some success in the home video marketplace with a few of the picked up films, DEJ ended its exclusive deal with Blockbuster to gain wider release of some of its breakout titles. An example was when DEJ picked up the home video rights to The Boondock Saints which had failed at the box office but proceeded to make almost $12 million in home video and spawning a sequel. DEJ began co-financing higher profile films for theatrical release including, Monster and Crash. DEJ's first Oscar winner was Charlize Theron in Monster. The following year, the independent film Crash was the winner of several Academy Awards including Best Achievement in Film Editing, Best Writing of an Original Screenplay, and Best Motion Picture of the Year, as well as 41 other awards from various organizations. DEJ's increasing notoriety led to more involvement in the production side, which was a change in its business model. The first result was that the company scaled back the number of productions it was involved with. The second was that the financial risk increased as the push for quality was raised. "As a company that's looking to grow over time, the objective is to find projects that are bigger and better," said DEJ VP of acquisitions Andy Reimer.

With the shift in business came both business practices and ownership change. First Look Studios combined sales forces with DEJ as First Look began to distribute some of DEJ's home video product starting in 2001. Four years later, First Look Studios purchased DEJ from Blockbuster for $25 million (~$38.5 million in 2024) in 2005. It received DEJ's entire inventory of 225 films, as well, in exchange for home video revenue sharing with Blockbuster. DEJ's Dean Wilson moved over to First Look as its Chief Operating Officer.

By 2010, First Look Studios fortunes had eroded, and the company was disbanded following bankruptcy. While the DEJ nameplate was largely discontinued by 2006 just after the First Look buyout, its logo can still be seen in video releases as Millennium Entertainment acquired much of the DEJ and First Look film library in 2010. In 2011, the filmmakers who made Animal for DEJ received a favorable decision concerning the profits made in the 2005 direct-to-video release.

== Distribution ==
- Still Breathing (1998)
- The Curve (1998)
- The Boondock Saints (1999)
- The Runner (1999)
- Lush (1999)
- Contaminated Man (2000)
- The Attic Expeditions (2001)
- The Circuit (2002)
- The Circuit 2 (2002)
- Crazy as Hell (2002)
- D-Tox (aka Eye See You) (2002)
- Dahmer (2002)
- Hard Cash (aka Run for the Money) (2002)
- Home Room (2002)
- The Outsider (2002)
- Partners In Action (2002)
- Scorched (2002)
- Snake Island (2002)
- Wolves of Wall Street (2002)
- Aileen: Life and Death of a Serial Killer (2003)
- Evil Alien Conquerors (2003)
- Gacy (2003)
- Gang of Roses (2003)
- Good Fences (2003)
- A Good Night to Die (2003)
- Grand Theft Parsons (2003)
- In Hell (2003)
- Lost Treasure (2003)
- Monster (2003)
- Party Monster (2003)
- Shark Zone (2003)
- Blast (2004)
- Blessed (2004)
- Crash (2004)
- Employee of the Month (2004)
- The Hollow (2004)
- Method (2004)
- My Date with Drew (2004)
- Nora's Hair Salon (2004)
- Post Impact (2004)
- Ring of Darkness (2004)
- Wake of Death (2004)
- Dirty Love (2005)
- The Matador (2005)
- Half Light (2006)
- Peaceful Warrior (2006)
- The Prince and Me 2: The Royal Wedding (2006)
