= Leeflang =

Leeflang is a surname. Notable people with the surname include:

- Conchita Leeflang, Surinamese-American musician and actress
- Dennis Leeflang (born 1979), Dutch drummer
- Djamel Leeflang (born 1992), Dutch footballer
- Frank Leeflang (born 1936), Surinamese politician
