= Jean-Claude La Marre =

American actor

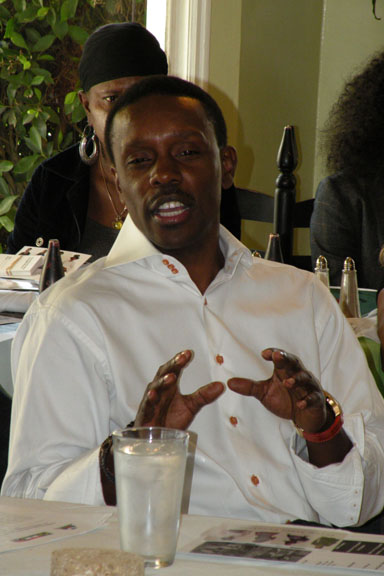
- Jean-Claude La Marre speaking at press conference in Los Angeles on October 9, 2009
- Born: October 10, 1961 (age 64); Brooklyn, New York City, U.S.
- Education: Brooklyn College (BA)
- Occupations: Actor; producer; director; writer
- Years active: 1992–present

Jean-Claude La Marre is a Haitian-American actor, writer, and director. His acting credits include the films Malcolm X and Dead Presidents. On television, he has guest-starred on New York Undercover, Law & Order, and NYPD Blue. He is also the writer and director of the independent films Gang of Roses and Go for Broke.

== Early life and education ==
La Marre was born in Brooklyn and earned a Bachelor of Arts degree in political science from Brooklyn College.

== Career ==
In 1994, La Marre appeared as Jake in Fresh. La Marre's Color of the Cross is a film that portrays Jesus as a black man, and implies that Christ's persecution was a racially motivated hate crime. His directorial debut was the film Higher Ed.

In 2007, LaMarre set up a distribution output deal for his film label, Nulite Media Group. During the period, he was credited for releasing over 60 feature films. Among the films released through the label are the revisionist western, Gang of Roses, Trapped: Haitian Nights, Broom Wedding, and Nora's Hair Salon, with a cameo by the late Whitney Houston in the film. In 2017, he wrote and directed "Kinky", a 50 Shades of Grey-esque erotic thriller. The film as released on 700 screens around the country. In 2018, he wrote and directed the upcoming film "Gangland" with singer Tamar Braxton and actors Wood Harris and Clifton Powell.

== Filmography ==
=== Film ===
Year	Title	Role	Notes
1992	Malcolm X	Benjamin 2X	
1994	Fresh	Jake	
1995	The Walking Dead	Pvt. Earl Anderson	
1995	Denise Calls Up	Cab Driver	
1995	Sweet Nothing	Beany	
1995	Dead Presidents	Ramsuer	
1996	Basquiat	Shenge	
2001	Higher Ed	Melvin	
2002	Go for Broke	Mouse	
2003	Gang of Roses	Baby Face Malone	
2004	Nora's Hair Salon	Devin	
2004	Sugar Valentine	Sugar Valentine	
2005	Go for Broke 2	Mouse	
2005	County General	Craig	
2005	Brothers in Arms	Slim	
2005	Ride or Die	Lucky	
2005	Pastor Jones	Pastor Jones / Grandpa Slick	Direct-to-video
2006	VooDoo Curse: The Giddeh	Tribal Leader	
2006	Pastor Jones 2: Lord Guide My 16 Year Old Daughter	Grandpa Slick / Pastor Jones	Direct-to-video
2006	Color of the Cross	Jesus Christ	
2007	Black Woman's Guide to Finding a Good Man	The Host	Direct-to-video
2007	Pastor Jones: Sisters in Spirit	Pastor Jones	Direct-to-video
2008	Don't Touch If You Ain't Prayed 2	Pastor Jones	Direct-to-video
2008	Pastor Jones: Samuel and Delia	Pastor Jones	Direct-to-video
2008	Color of the Cross 2: The Resurrection	Yeshua	
2008	Nora's Hair Salon 2: A Cut Above	Devin	
2009	Pastor Jones: Sisters in Spirit 2	Pastor Jones	Direct-to-video
2009	Pastor Jones: Preachin' to the Choir	Pastor Jones	Direct-to-video
2009	Pastor Jones: My Sister Loves You	Pastor Jones	Direct-to-video
2010	Trapped: Haitian Nights	Detective Stewart	
2010	Pastor Jones: The Complete First Season	Pastor Jones	Direct-to-video
2011	Kassava Jerks	Trevor	Direct-to-video
2011	Bff	Jacque	
2011	Sugar Valentine 2	Sugar	
2011	Nora's Hair Salon 3: Shear Disaster	Devin	
2012	Gang of Roses II: Next Generation	Jacob	
2012	What Men Think	Pastor Jones	
2013	The Sins of Deacon Whyles	Pastor Jones	
2014	Assistant Motives	Pastor Jones	
2014	Basketball Girlfriend	The Hatian	
2015	Chocolate City	Pastor Jones	
2017	Chocolate City: Vegas Strip	Pastor Jones	
2018	Kinky	Dr. Richardson	
2018	GangLand	Detective Williams	

=== Television ===
Year	Title	Role	Notes
1994, 1995	New York Undercover	Issac Foweler / Dusable	2 episodes
1996	Law & Order	Francis Murphy	Episode: "Encore"
1996	On Seventh Avenue	Darren Tyler	Television film
1996	Screen Two	Albert	Episode: "Deadly Voyage"
1999	Seven Days	Bone	Episode: "The Football"
2001	NYPD Blue	Vance Davis	Episode: "Nariz a Nariz"
