= Nora's Hair Salon 2: A Cut Above =

- Directed by: Jill Maxcy
- Written by: Chanel Capra; Jill Maxcy
- Produced by: Lila Aviv; Malik Barnhardt; Maxwell Cain; Albert C. Chevalier; Ken Halsband; Jean-Claude La Marre; Thai Liu; Glenn Miller; Mekhi Phifer; Ronnie Warner
- Starring: Tatyana Ali; Bobby Brown; Brandi Burnside; Stacey Dash; Donn Swaby
- Cinematography: Laura Beth Love
- Music by: Flexx
- Distributed by: 20th Century Fox Home Entertainment
- Release date: May 13, 2008
- Running time: 81 minutes
- Country: United States
- Language: English

Nora's Hair Salon 2: A Cut Above is a 2008 comedy-drama film written by Chanel Capra and Jill Maxcy, who also directed. It stars Tatyana Ali, Stacey Dash, and Bobby Brown. The sequel to 2004's Nora's Hair Salon, it features mostly the same cast as the original. (The eventual third film, Nora's Hair Salon 3: Shear Disaster, featured a completely new set of actors.) The film received poor reception from critics.

== Plot summary ==
Recently deceased beauty-salon owner Nora has bequeathed her business to her two estranged nieces, who are at odds regarding the best way to make the most of their inheritance.

== Cast ==
- Tatyana Ali as Lilliana
- Stacey Dash as Simone
- Christine Carlo as Xenobia
- Donn Swaby as Delicious
- Bobby Brown as Caress/Old Man Butter
- Brandi Burnside as Tashina
- Clearthur Lee III as Sensation
- Ananda Lewis as Ananda
- Don Wilson Moore as Dexter Lewis
- Claudine Oriol as Jill
- Jonny Siew]l as Ling
- Lucille Soong as Ming
- Jean-Claude La Marre as Devin
- Mekhi Phifer as Maxwell Terry
