= Nora's Hair Salon =

2004 comedy drama film

- Film poster
- Directed by: Jerry LaMothe
- Written by: Chanel Capra; Jean-Claude La Marre
- Produced by: Jean-Claude La Marre; Tim Swain; Tamala Jones
- Starring: Jenifer Lewis; Tamala Jones; Tatyana Ali; Lil' Kim
- Distributed by: DEJ Productions
- Release date: July 25, 2004
- Running time: 84 minutes
- Language: English

Nora's Hair Salon is a 2004 independent comedy-drama film, written by Chanel Capra and Jean-Claude La Marre, and directed by Jerry LaMothe. This film stars Jenifer Lewis, Tamala Jones, and Tatyana Ali.

== Plot ==
Nora Harper (Jenifer Lewis) is an African-American businesswoman who owns a hair salon in Los Angeles, California. She keeps a watchful eye over her employees, friends, relatives, and regular customers. Lilleana (Tatyana Ali) is a new employee from the Dominican Republic who is in an abusive relationship with Bennie (Bobby Brown). Chloe (Tamala Jones) is a hairstylist with aspirations of a career in show business. Ming (Lucille Soong) is an opinionated manicurist with anger issues. Devin (Jean-Claude La Marre) is a bisexual man who is uncertain about his relationship with Delicious, and fears losing his girlfriend (played by Lil' Kim as herself) in the event she discovers his attraction to men. Later in the film, Nora suffers a heart attack; her friends from the salon hope for her recovery, but she dies shortly before the end of the film. In the end, the salon remains open, selling Nora's hairstyling products.

== Cast ==
- Jenifer Lewis as Nora Harper
- Tamala Jones as Chloe (addressed as "Clo")
- Tatyana Ali as Lilleana
- Jean-Claude La Marre as Devin
- Bobby Brown as Benny
- Lucille Soong as Ming
- Claudia Jordan as Dahlia
- Christine Carlo as Xenobia
- Donn Swaby as Delicious
- Jonathan McDaniel as Leronne
- Lil' Kim as Herself
- Whitney Houston as Herself
- Cheyenne Maxey as Girl Scout

== Sequel ==
A direct-to-video sequel was released, titled Nora's Hair Salon 2: A Cut Above featuring Tatyana Ali in the starring role, and co-starring Stacey Dash, Donn Swaby, Bobby Brown, and Mekhi Phifer. The film is lighter in tone and content than its predecessor, with a PG-13 rating. Creator and co-star Jean-Claude La Marre cameos as Devin, who has become a minister and is now straight, much to the chagrin of his ex Delicious.

A third film was released in 2011 titled Nora's Hair Salon 3: Shear Disaster. However, none of the original cast appears. This time around, Delicious is the main character and new owner of the salon.
