= Kimberly Crandall =

American actress

- Occupation: Actress
- Years active: 2004–present
- Website: kimberlycrandall.com

Kimberly Crandall is an American actress known for her roles in Beckinfield and Fresh Off the Boat. Kimberly is also an acting coach.

== Filmography ==
=== Film ===
| Year | Title | Role | Notes |
|---|---|---|---|
| 2004 | The Sale | Tennis Pro | (Short) |
| 2004 | The Amoeba | The therapist | (Short) |
| 2005 | The Phone Ranger | Diane | (Short) |
| 2005 | Locked In | Nurse Dolnick | (Short) |
| 2005 | The First Miss | Ms. Swanson | (Short) |
| 2006 | Love Is for Democrats | Maureen McGovern | (Short) |
| 2006 | Broken Hearts Club | Mandy | (Short) |
| 2008 | The Full Picture | Ellie | |
| 2009 | The Shoe That Fits | Karren | (Short) |
| 2010 | Clear Blue | Aerobics Class | (Short) |
| 2011 | Happy Apocalypse! | Erin Marshall | |
| 2013 | Stranger at the Pentagon | Teel | (Short) |
| 2013 | Thomas | Martha | (Short) |
| 2016 | In Dubious Battle | Mrs. Thompson | (post-production) |
| 2016 | Faceless | Prom Queen | (post-production) |

=== Television ===
| Year | Title | Role | Notes |
|---|---|---|---|
| 2004 | Passions | Madeline | 2 episodes |
| 2006 | The Young and the Restless | Woman #2 | 1 episode |
| 2009 | ER | Executive Mom | Episode: "Old Times" |
| 2009 | Criminal Minds | Jane Young | Episode: "Outfoxed" |
| 2010-2011 | Beckinfield | Jane Young | 10 episodes |
| 2011 | Gossip Girl | L.A. Realtor | Episode: "Beauty and the Feast" |
| 2013 | 90210 | Clerk | Episode: "We're Not Not in Kansas Anymore" |
| 2014 | Matador | The Woman | Episode: "The Anguish of Rosarito" |
| 2015 | South of Hell | Money Honey | 1 episode |
| 2015 | Fresh Off the Boat | Lisa | Recurring role |
| 2015 | Scandal | Margot Ross | Episode: "Honor Thy Father" |
| 2015 | The Inspectors | Alexandra Whitton | Episode: "Too Good to Be True" |
