= Donn Swaby =

American actor (born 1973)

- Born: August 20, 1973 (age 52); Queens, New York
- Occupation: Actor/Musician/Writer
- Years active: 1997–present

Donn Swaby (born August 20, 1973) is an American actor. He is best known for playing the role of Chad Harris-Crane on the television soap opera Passions.

== Career ==
He attended and graduated from Archbishop Molloy High School in Queens, New York, then attended Boston University, receiving a degree. He played the role of Chad on Passions from the show's debut in July 1999 until September 2002, when he was replaced by Charles Divins.

== Filmography ==
=== Film ===
Year	Title	Role	Notes
1997	G.I. Jane	Yeoman Davis	
1999	Raw Nerve	Glasses	
2004	Nora's Hair Salon	Delicious	
2004	Buds for Life	Dante Jones	
2006	Open Window	Greg	
2007	Before and After	Re-DickU-Lust	Short
2008	Nora's Hair Salon 2: A Cut Above	Delicious	
2008	Somebody's Gonna Pay	Pool Guy	Short
2010	ATM	Nathan	Short
2011	The Bachelor Party	Chris	Video
2015	Wedding	Johnny	Short
2016	The Real Man	Casting Director #2	Short
2017	People You May Know	Perfect Buyer	
2017	The Two Professors	Prof. Randall Harding	Short
2017	Star Wars: The Mission	Lido Calrissean	Short
2017	Guns in the Poster	Dan	Short
2018	The Date	Harry	Short
2018	The Forum	Phil	Short
2018	Marry My Ex Dot Com	John	Short
2020	Demon Within	Newscaster	Short

=== Television ===
Year	Title	Role	Notes
1999	The Sopranos	Guy on Bridge	Episode: "Pax Soprana"
1999–2002	Passions	Chad Harris	Regular Cast
2003	The Parkers	Charlie	Episode: "The Hold Up"
2003	Judging Amy	Willie Edwards	Episode: "Wild Card"
2003	Half & Half	Jason	Episode: "The Big Much I Do About Nothing Episode"
2005	Crossing Jordan	Reggie Duplaix	Episode: "Family Affair"
2005	Surface	Andy Cline	Episode: "Episode #1.1"
2006	Charmed	Zohar	Episode: "Kill Billie: Vol. 2"
2009	Monk	Paramedic	Episode: "Mr. Monk Makes the Playoffs"
2010	Gigantic	Hugh	Recurring cast
2011	Happily Divorced	Lounge Bartender	Episode: "Anniversary"
2016	How to Get Away with Murder	Nurse	Episode: "There's My Baby"

== Awards and nominations ==
Year	Result	Award	Category	Work
2009	Won	NAACP Theatre Award	Best Ensemble	Black Angels Over Tuskegee
2005	Nominated	The Golden Boomerang Award	Most Popular Supporting Male Star	Passions
2001	Nominated	NAACP Theatre Award	Best Ensemble	Slow Dance on the Killing Ground
2001	Nominated	Soap Opera Digest Awards	Outstanding Younger Lead Actor	Passions
2000	Nominated	Soap Opera Digest Awards	Outstanding Male Newcomer	Passions
