= Thomas L. Callaway =

American film director

- Education: Sam Houston College; Sam Houston College
- Occupations: film director and cinematographer

Thomas L. Callaway is an American film director and cinematographer from Waco, Texas. He resides in Los Angeles.

== Early life ==
Callaway is a native of Waco, Texas, and grew up with six sisters. He attended Catholic school and then enrolled at Sam Houston College.

== Cinematography ==
As a cinematographer, Callaway's credits include Feast,Road House 2: Last Call, Undead or Alive, Who's Your Caddy?, National Lampoon's Gold Diggers,Critters 3, Critters 4, A Warrior's Heart, Heebie Jeebies and The New House Party. The podcast's host credits him with more than 80 credits as a cinematographer and notes that he also appeared on camera in the behind-the-scenes coverage of the Project Greenlight production of Feast.

== Broke Sky ==
Callaway's debut as a director, Broke Sky (2007), which he also shot, was an official selection of the South by Southwest Film Festival, won best narrative feature at the Memphis Indie Film Festival, and won the Grand Jury award at the Dances with Films festival. Reviewing it for ScreenAnarchy in 2008, a critic described it as a rustic noir that shifts from rural comedy into something much darker, and judged that its production values far outstripped its modest budget. The review also praised its color-rich widescreen compositions of the Waco, Texas locations, and noted that, despite its festival success, the film still lacked a distributor.

== Filmography ==
- A Time for Sunset (2025)
- Give Till It Hurts (2022)
- Walk. Ride. Rodeo. (2019)
- Trafficked (2017)
- Punk's Dead (2015)
- Heebie Jibbies
- Rain from Stars (2010)
- Something Wicked (2010)
- Without a Paddle: Nature's Calling (2009)
- The Devil's Tomb (2009)
- Still Waiting... (2009)
- Exit Speed (2008)
- Who's Your Caddy? (2007)
- Eternal Waters (2007) (TV)
- Broke Sky (2007) (Director and cinematographer)
- Demon Wind (1990)
