= Broke Sky =

- Directed by: Thomas L. Callaway
- Written by: Scott Phillips; John Howard; Frank Paterson; Brian Muir; Dan Golden; Thomas L. Callaway
- Produced by: Jeff Burr; Karchi Perlmann; Eric Miller; Dan Golden
- Starring: Will Wallace; Joe Unger; Bruce Glover; Duane Whitaker; Barbara Chisholm; Marco Perella; Jennifer Matyear; Jamielyn Kane; Chris Messersmith; Brooklin Bailey
- Cinematography: Thomas L. Callaway
- Music by: Kristopher Carter; Michael McCuistion; Lolita Ritmanis
- Production company: Buzzard Films
- Release date: July 2007 (Dances with Films Festival)
- Running time: 97 minutes
- Country: United States
- Language: English

Broke Sky is a 2007 neo-noir 35 millimeter film, and the directorial debut of cinematographer Thomas L. Callaway. The film stars Will Wallace, Joe Unger, Bruce Glover, Duane Whitaker and Barbara Chisholm, and has earned comparisons to the work of the Coen Brothers.

== Plot ==
Bucky and Earl are the two man team that collect and dispose of road kill for the county. A new, specially designed carcass removal truck forces them to choose which one of them gets to keep his job and who is let go. Earl comes up with a plan so they can both keep their jobs, but it means working at night. One night they are called out to Rufus's house where there is something dead in the well that needs to be removed. When Earl and Bucky discover what is fouling the well, their shock and confusion turns to panic and fear as they figure out what to do. Disagreement and conflict arise between them and this gradually builds to mistrust, suspicion and mystery, revealing secrets of a dirty, vile, inconceivable past. A past as repulsive as the road kill they scoop off the road.

== Production ==
Broke Sky was shot on location in Waco, Texas.

== Featured cast ==
Actor	Role
Will Wallace	Bucky
Joe Unger	Earl
Bruce Glover	Rufus
Duane Whitaker	Sheriff Winslow
Barbara Chisholm	Becky

== Awards ==
Dances With Films 2007: Won, Grand Jury Award
Memphis Indie Film Festival 2007: Won, Best Narrative Feature
Idyllwild International Festival of Cinema (IIFC) 2010: Won, Best Cinematography
