= Color of the Cross =

2006 film by Jean-Claude La Marre

- Theatrical release poster
- Directed by: Jean-Claude La Marre
- Written by: Jean-Claude La Marre
- Produced by: Ken Halsband; Jessie Levostre; Cecil L. Murray
- Starring: Jean-Claude La Marre; Debbi Morgan; Elya Baskin; David Gianopoulos; Ananda Lewis; Caspar Poyck; Stephen Wozniak
- Music by: Flexx; Jean-Claude La Marre
- Distributed by: 20th Century Fox
- Release date: October 27, 2006
- Running time: 88 minutes
- Country: United States
- Language: English
- Box office: $85,802

Color of the Cross is a 2006 religious film written by, directed by, and starring Jean-Claude La Marre.

The film is one of the few depictions of Christ as a black man, and portrays Jesus' persecution as the result of racism.

== Plot ==
In what would later become the last 48 hours of his life, Jesus of Nazareth (Jean-Claude La Marre), a Black man, leads a group of 12 disciples to the biblical city of Arimathea to celebrate the Jewish holiday of Passover. The city of Arimathea is governed by the elite Jewish Sanhedrin under the administrative jurisdiction of the Roman Empire who persecute and discriminate against the Jewish population. Growing weary of the popular influence displayed by Jesus, a Jew claiming to be a messiah, the Sanhedrin wish to call an emergency meeting to discuss his growing power and clout. From the Sanhedrin, some of the members find it hard to believe a black man although Jewish, could in fact be the messiah. The members attempt to formulate a plan to capture and interrogate Jesus over his alleged blasphemy. Meanwhile, Jesus with the help of his disciple John (Akiva David), discovers a safe dwelling in Arimathea to consume the Passover meal away from the watchful patrol of Roman soldiers who are also attempting to subdue him over his reputation. Accordingly, Mary (Debbi Morgan), the mother of Jesus, comes to believe her son is being individually singled out on motivations based on race. In addition to persecuting Jews in general, the Romans also view Jews who are black in skin color as a more troublesome ramification than just ordinary white Jews.

After a trek through the wilderness in the province of Judea, Jesus and his followers arrive in Arimathea. During the passover meal at a secret location within a Jewish guest home, Jesus reveals a vision which he experienced from God; depicting one of his disciples will betray him and hand him over to the Romans as a blasphemous criminal against the Empire. After hearing of the so-called miracles which Jesus performed, such as the healing of a blind man, and the restoring of life to a dead person, Caiphas (Elya Baskin), the leader of the Sanhedrin remains unconvinced of Jesus' prowess. The Sanhedrin believe that Jesus may in fact be a prophet like other Jews in the past, but do not believe he is a messiah. Later, Judas Iscariot (Johann John Jean), one of Jesus' followers, betrays him for a payment of 30 pieces of silver by revealing his hiding place from the Romans to Caiphas. Against the wishes of his fellow members in not involving the Romans into the matter, Caiphas recruits a group of Roman soldiers led by Horatius (David Gianopoulos), to capture Jesus. Earlier, Jesus along with his disciples left the Jewish guest home to seek refuge in the Garden of Gethsemane within the mountains of Judea. Following his capture with the aid of Judas, Horatius leads Jesus away to a presumed trial before the Romans. Jesus is later condemned to death and crucified.

== Post production ==
=== Sequel ===
The sequel to the film, Color of the Cross 2: The Resurrection, was released on DVD on Wednesday, March 5, 2008, including a performance of Judas Iscariot by Sebastian Siegel.

== Reception ==
=== Critical response ===
Reaction to the film was generally negative due to its low budget and production qualities. Among reviews, Jeannette Catsoulis of The New York Times, noted that "Color of the Cross, a low-budget re-imagining of Christ's final days, makes a big deal out of the relatively tame suggestion that Jesus was black." Todd McCarthy of Variety solidly concurred saying, "Lacking the drama of Jesus' trial and the passion, as well as the substance of his teachings, (actor Jean Claude) LaMarre's turgid take has very little to offer dramatically or inspirationally."

=== Box office ===
At its widest release in the U.S., the film was screened at 29 theaters grossing $25,868 in its opening weekend. The film went on to gross $85,802 in ticket sales through a 4-week theatrical run.

=== Home media ===
The Region 1 Code widescreen edition of the film was released on DVD in the United States on January 9, 2007. Currently, there is no set date on a future Blu-ray Disc release for the film.
