= Reynaldo Rey =

American actor and comedian (1940–2015)

- Rey in House Party 3 (1994)
- Born: Harry Reynolds; January 27, 1940; Sequoyah County, Oklahoma, U.S.
- Died: May 28, 2015 (aged 75); Los Angeles, California, U.S.
- Resting place: Forest Lawn Memorial Park (Hollywood Hills)
- Occupations: Actor; comedian; television personality
- Years active: 1973–2012

Reynaldo Rey (born Harry Reynolds; January 27, 1940 – May 28, 2015) was an American actor, comedian and television personality.

== Career ==
Rey moved to Cleveland, Ohio, where he taught for seven years and became a member of the Karamu House Theatre, world-renowned for its development of top-notch actors, directors and producers. There, he launched his career in comedy, going on the road with the O'Jays. He then moved to New York City, where he was invited to join the Harlem Theater Group. While a member of the group, he appeared in his first movie. From there he performed in Europe, Asia and Africa for two years. Rey has appeared in 52 movies, including Friday, House Party 3, White Men Can't Jump, A Rage in Harlem, and Harlem Nights, where he appeared with the likes of Redd Foxx (his mentor, for whom he often opened shows), Della Reese, Richard Pryor, Arsenio Hall, and Eddie Murphy. He also has 32 television shows to his credit, including BET's Comic View, 1998–1999, 2000–2001, on which he was a co-host, The Tonight Show, Robert Townsend's Parents in Crime, and The Parent Hood, and 227 as Ray the Mailman. He also appeared on a show called Noah's Arc. Rey also recorded three comedy albums and three videos. He produced his own video, which features a rap he wrote called "I’m Scared A U" after overwhelming audience reaction to it on Russell Simmons' Def Comedy Jam. Rey also appeared twice in 1973 as a contestant on the popular game show Match Game. He was brought back due to a technicality, and would go on to win 3 games, and a total of 650 dollars.

== Death ==
Rey died on May 28, 2015, due to complications from a stroke he suffered a year prior.

He is interred in the Forest Lawn Memorial Park (Hollywood Hills).

== Partial Filmography ==
- Disco Sexpot (1979)
- Young Doctors in Love (1982) – The Cops – Cicerelli
- Harlem Nights (1989) – Gambler
- Far Out Man (1990) – Lou
- A Rage in Harlem (1991) – Blind Man
- The Three Muscatels (1991) – King Alberto Nacho
- White Men Can't Jump (1992) – Tad
- Bebe's Kids (1992) – Lush (voice)
- House Party 3 (1994) – Veda's Dad
- Friday (1995) – Red's Father
- Sprung (1997) – Brotha #2
- Fakin' da Funk (1997) – Earnest
- The Breaks (1999) – Uncle Deion
- Jackie's Back (1999, TV Movie) – Cadillac Johnson (Retired Pimp)
- Play It to the Bone (1999) – Sportswriter
- Little Richard (2000, TV Movie) – Sugarfoot Sam
- The Cheapest Movie Ever Made (2000)
- For da Love of Money (2002) – Pops
- The Sunday Morning Stripper (2003, Short) – Elder Jenkins
- Survival of the Illest (2004) – Old School
- Super Spy (2004)
- My Big Phat Hip Hop Family (2005) – Terrell Mathis
- Treasure n tha Hood (2005) – Willie
- Issues (2005) – Mr. Livingston
- Noah's Arc (2005)- Chance's Landlord
- Who Made the Potato Salad? (2006) – Mr. Brown
- Uncle P (2006) – Mailman
- Everybody Hates Chris (2007, TV Series) – Mr. Lester
- Divine Intervention (2007) – Deacon Jones
- First Sunday (2008) – Soul Joe
- Internet Dating (2008) – Mr. Bentay
- American Dream (2008) – Manager
- Pawn Shop (2012) – Rey's Pal (final film role)
