= The Players Club =

1998 film directed by Ice Cube

- Theatrical release poster
- Directed by: Ice Cube
- Written by: Ice Cube
- Produced by: Carl Craig; Patricia Charbonnet
- Starring: Bernie Mac; Monica Calhoun; A. J. Johnson; Ice Cube; Alex Thomas; LisaRaye; Jamie Foxx; John Amos
- Cinematography: Malik Sayeed
- Edited by: Suzanne Hines
- Music by: Hidden Faces
- Production companies: Ghettobird Productions; Cube Vision Productions
- Distributed by: New Line Cinema
- Release date: April 10, 1998
- Running time: 104 minutes
- Country: United States
- Language: English
- Budget: $5 million
- Box office: $23.3 million

The Players Club is a 1998 American dark comedy-drama film written and directed by Ice Cube in his feature film directorial debut. In addition to Ice Cube, the film stars Bernie Mac, Monica Calhoun, Jamie Foxx, John Amos, A. J. Johnson, Alex Thomas, Charlie Murphy, Terrence Howard, Faizon Love and LisaRaye McCoy in her first starring role.

== Plot ==
Diana Armstrong reflects on her past while she gazes at the ruins of the Players Club, a strip club where she used to work. She begins reminiscing about the time she moved out of her parents' home. She recalls leaving her parents’ home after her father refused to help pay for her to attend an HBCU. Pregnant and determined to be independent, Diana moves out and gets an apartment with her boyfriend, Lance, while attempting to continue her education.

After taking a job at a shoe store to support herself, Diana meets Ronnie and Tricks, employees of the Players Club, who convince her she could earn more money as a stripper. Club owner Dollar Bill hires her and gives her the stage name “Diamond.”

Four years later, Diana is on the verge of graduation, but her younger cousin Ebony comes to live with her and also starts working at the club. Ebony is soon out of control, drinking excessively, staying out all night, stripping at private house parties, and dressing inappropriately around the house which clearly attracts Lance.

As Diana continues working at the Players Club, tension grows in her relationship with her boyfriend Lance, who becomes increasingly frustrated with her job and the emotional toll it takes on their relationship. He expresses resentment at constantly hearing about her stripping, which contributes to the deterioration of their relationship and ultimately leads to their breakup.

Several scenes depict episodes in the life of the club: While working at the Players Club, Diamond gives a private dance to Myron, her regular customer, during a night when rapper Uncle Luke is visiting the club. She is mortified when she notices her journalism professor, Professor Mills, entering the club with friends. Diamond abruptly leaves the floor and hides in the locker room, and the encounter leads her to begin skipping Mills’s classes out of embarrassment. The night ends in a fistfight as the Luke’s bodyguard punches Clyde in the back of the head. Reggie attacks the bodyguard and is thrown through the plate glass window of the VIP section. He starts shooting until XL disarms him.

Diamond’s relationship with one of her regular customers, Myron, takes a disturbing turn when he reveals that he has been following her home after work under the pretense of ensuring her safety. Although Diamond reaches her apartment unharmed, the night continues to deteriorate when she discovers her ex-boyfriend Lance in bed with her cousin Ebony. Furious and betrayed, Diamond confronts them and expels Ebony from her apartment, effectively cutting her off from her life and support.

Professor Mills later approaches Diana on campus and reassures her, gently acknowledging that he understands the job she works is not what she ultimately wants for herself. He encourages her not to abandon her education and urges her to continue pursuing journalism. Mills then provides Diana with a professional contact at BET, reaffirming her long-term goals and foreshadowing her eventual career in television news.

Dollar Bill is confronted by the Doctor, enforcer for drug lord and loan shark St. Louis, who reveals that Dollar Bill owes $60,000 and threatens him unless he produces a $10,000 payment. The following day, St. Louis’s men Brooklyn and K-Ci abduct Dollar Bill and place him in the trunk of his car, but they are stopped by corrupt officers Peters and Freeman, who discover Dollar Bill and arrest him on outstanding warrants. He is later released on bail and returns to the Players Club.

Ebony is offered a gig to dance at Ronnie's brother Junior's bachelor party. Clyde convinces Ronnie to go outside and smoke some Marijuana with him, one of St. Louis's henchmen, named Reggie, tricks Junior into raping Ebony. Reggie tells him that he and Clyde had run a train on her weeks ago, but it was spoiled by Diamond. Junior goes into Ebony's room while she is changing and against Ebony's pleas, Junior turns off the lights and violently beats and rapes her while his friends listen to it in disgust. The guys decide to leave the party and end their friendship with Junior. Ronnie discovers Junior with Ebony, and both flee the scene leaving Ebony in the motel room. Diamond and Blue arrive at the motel room as Ebony called Diamond earlier in the night. They discover an unconscious and bloodied Ebony and they call 911. A furious Diamond then arrives at the Players Club and beats Ronnie up as punishment, avenging Ebony. It was also revealed that Ronnie raped Diamond four years ago when she was unconscious. Diamond then punches Tricks in the face and quits in front of Dollar Bill before she leaves with Blue.

Ronnie and Tricks are arrested by Freeman and Peters. That same night, St. Louis comes to collect and personally shoots up the club. As Dollar tries to escape, he is captured by St. Louis' henchmen. Later, St. Louis' associate Brooklyn destroys the club with a LAW rocket.

Ebony, still sporting the bruises from her rape, now has a job working at the shoe store. Ebony and Diana are back on good terms again. In voice-over, Diamond narrates the fates of the characters, including herself, who is currently in a relationship with Blue. She now works on the news.

== Cast ==
- LisaRaye McCoy as Diana "Diamond" Armstrong: A college student, single mom and aspiring journalist who gets a job at The Players Club to raise money for her college tuition.
- Bernie Mac as "Dollar Bill": the dim crooked owner of The Players Club who is threatened by a loan shark named St. Louis.
- Monica Calhoun as Ebony Armstrong: Diamond's younger cousin who becomes out-of-control after getting a job at The Players Club.
- A. J. Johnson as "Lil' Man": the club's small-sized doorman who is frequently taunted and harmed by St. Louis and his crooks.
- Ice Cube as Reggie: A henchman working for St. Louis.
- Alex Thomas as Clyde: Reggie's best friend who, like Reggie, has a thirst towards Ebony and works for St. Louis.
- Jamie Foxx as "Blue": the club's radio disc jockey and Diamond's love interest.
- John Amos as Officer Freeman: a crooked police officer who harasses suspects.
- Faizon Love as Officer Peters: another police officer who harasses suspects.
- Charles Q. Murphy as "Brooklyn": St. Louis' main henchman.
- Adele Givens as "Tricks": A stripper at The Players Club and a right-hand of Ronnie.
- Chrystale Wilson as Ronnie: A stripper at The Players Club with a rivalry with Diamond and Ebony.
- Tracy C. Jones as Tina
- Terrence Howard as K.C.: St. Louis' secondary henchman and Brooklyn's partner in crime.
- Larry McCoy as "St. Louis": a wheelchair-using gangster to whom Dollar Bill owes money.
- Ronn Riser as Professor Mills
- Dick Anthony Williams as Mr. Armstrong: Diamond's father
- Badja Djola as "The Doctor": St. Louis' enforcer.
- Tiny Lister as "XL" The Bouncer: a tall, muscular bouncer of the club.
- Judyann Elder as Mrs. Armstrong: Diamond's mother
- Oren Williams as Jamal Armstrong: Diamond's 4-year-old son.
- Samuel Monroe Jr. as Junior: Ronnie's younger brother who beats and rapes Ebony in the film's climax.
- Luther Campbell as Luke: a rapper who visits the club.
- Michael Clarke Duncan as Bodyguard: the tall, muscular bodyguard for Luke.
- Montae Russell as Lance: Diamond's boyfriend whom she ended her relationship with after he had sex with Ebony.

== Soundtrack ==
A successful soundtrack was released on March 17, 1998, It peaked at #10 on the Billboard 200 and #2 on the Top R&B/Hip-Hop Albums.

== Reception ==
=== Box office ===
The movie opened on April 10, 1998 and debuted at No. 5 in the box office, behind City of Angels, Lost in Space, Titanic, and Species II. It went on to gross $23,047,939 domestically, and $213,546 in foreign markets for a total lifetime gross of $23,261,485.

=== Critical response ===
On Rotten Tomatoes, the film has an approval rating of 35%, based on 17 reviews, with an average rating of 5.20/10.

Roger Ebert awarded the film 3 out of 4 stars and said, "Ice Cube makes The Players Club observant and insightful; beneath its melodrama lurks unsentimental information about why young women do lap dances for a living, and what they think about themselves and their customers." He added, "What's interesting about [the film] is how it moves through various tones and kinds of material. There's the documentary stuff, the crime story, Diana's shaky romance with a new boyfriend, Ebony's problems, and comic relief from the stylized dialogue of Dollar Bill and his doorman, L'il Man...And then a strong underpinning of economic reality". He noted, "The movie doesn't preach, but it has values. It sees the Players Club as a job, and the women there are workers, not sex objects." Owen Gleiberman of Entertainment Weekly also gave a positive review. Like Ebert, he praised the cast, particularly LisaRaye's performance as Diana.
