= Love Chronicles (film) =

- Directed by: Tyler Maddox-Simms
- Written by: Tyler Maddox-Simms
- Produced by: Kym Whitley; Monica R. Cooper; Troy Stroud; Tyler Maddox-Simms
- Starring: Terrence Howard; Robin Givens; LisaRaye McCoy; Clifton Powell
- Cinematography: William MacCollum
- Edited by: Byron Jost; Romeo Carey
- Music by: Ghalee Wadood
- Distributed by: UrbanWorks Entertainment
- Release date: December 31, 2003
- Running time: 89 minutes
- Country: United States
- Language: English

Love Chronicles is a 2003 romantic comedy, written and directed by Tyler Maddox-Simms. The film stars Clifton Powell, LisaRaye McCoy, Robin Givens, and Terrence Howard.

== Plot ==
A pair of talk show hosts, Sara (Paula Jai Parker) and Troy aka T-Roy (Terrence Howard), team with a relationship-guide author Monifa Burley (Robin Givens) to help listeners improve their relationships. Eventually, the trio unwittingly expose their own love-related baggage. Love Chronicles screened at the American Black Film Festival in June 2003 & was released theatrically on December 31, 2003.

== Cast ==
- Terrence Howard as "T-Roy"
- Robin Givens as Monifa Burly
- LisaRaye McCoy as Marie Tousaant
- Clifton Powell as Thomas
- Al Clegg as Marcus
- Aries Spears as Playa
- Chris Spencer as Gavin
- Darrel Heath as Kenny
- Holly Joy Gaines as Tamia
- Kym Whitley as Renee
- Monica Calhoun as Maya
- Paula Jai Parker as Sara
- Tommy "Tiny" Lister as Alfonso
- Buddy Lewis as Male Nurse
- Tracey Cherelle Jones as Nikkola
