= Monica Calhoun =

American film and television actress (born 1971)

- Born: July 29, 1971 (age 55); Philadelphia, Pennsylvania, U.S.
- Occupation: Actress
- Years active: 1985–present
- Known for: Mia Morgan – The Best Man, The Best Man Holiday; Ebony – The Players Club
- Height: 5 ft 4.5 in (163.8 cm)
- Children: 1

Monica Calhoun (born July 29, 1971) is an American film and television actress. Calhoun is best known for her roles in the films Bagdad Cafe (1987), The Players Club (1998), The Salon (2005), The Best Man (1999), and its sequel The Best Man Holiday (2013). She has also appeared in the films Sister Act 2: Back in the Habit (1993) and Love & Basketball (2000). Calhoun has been nominated for a Daytime Emmy Award and one NAACP Image Award.

== Biography ==
=== Early life and education ===
Born in Philadelphia, Pennsylvania, Calhoun is the daughter of Lorine Calhoun. She moved to California in the late 1970s, and began acting while in sixth grade. Calhoun attended the Los Angeles County High School for the Arts.

=== Career ===
Calhoun made her acting debut in the 1985 TV film Children of the Night as Wanda. She portrayed Phyllis, the daughter of CCH Pounder's character, in Bagdad Cafe (1987). Calhoun was the only actor in Bagdad Cafe to return for the television series, albeit the character's name was changed to Debbie. The televised adaptation lasted two seasons before being cancelled.

She portrayed Rebbie Jackson in the 1992 biopic miniseries The Jacksons: An American Dream. In 1993, she had a minor role in Sister Act 2: Back in the Habit and acted in the Disney Channel film The Ernest Green Story alongside Morris Chestnut. Calhoun received an Emmy Award nomination for her performance in the CBS Schoolbreak Special "Different Worlds: A Story of Interracial Love" (1993). Calhoun co-starred with actor Flex Alexander in the short-lived series, Where I Live, and appeared in Pacific Station.

Calhoun guest starred in several sitcoms including The Wayans Bros., A Different World and The Jamie Foxx Show, the latter as Jamie Foxx's sister. She appeared as Linda, one of the daughters of Donald Thornton in television film The Ditchdigger's Daughters (1997). Calhoun played the role of Ebony, a stripper, in Ice Cube's directorial debut The Players Club (1998).

She appeared in the lead role, Reese Delaware, in Intimate Betrayal (1999). In Love & Basketball (2000), she portrayed Kerry, a girlfriend of the basketball playing protagonist. In 2002, Calhoun appeared in Trois 2: Pandora's Box as psychologist Dr. Mia DuBois and portrayed Wet in Civil Brand. Calhoun played Rachel in the Western Gang of Roses (2003).

Calhoun portrayed Mia, the wife of Morris Chestnut's character, in The Best Man (1999). She received an NAACP Image Award nomination for Outstanding Actress in a Motion Picture in 2000 for her performance. She returned in its sequel The Best Man Holiday (2013). In the latter, Mia is terminally ill and dies at the end of the film.

She played the role of Brenda in 2007's The Salon starring Vivica Fox. In 2009, Robert Townsend directed Calhoun in Diary of a Single Mom, Season I, II and III (2008–10). Calhoun appeared as Patricia Tresvant, Ralph's mother in The New Edition Story miniseries which aired on the BET network in January 2017.

== Personal life ==
Calhoun gave birth to a son in 2000. Her son is blind.

== Filmography ==
=== Film ===
Year	Title	Role	Notes
1985	Children of the Night	Wanda	TV movie
1987	Bagdad Cafe	Phyllis	
1989	Heart and Soul	Janet	TV movie
1991	She Stood Alone	Eliza Hammond	TV movie
1993	The Ernest Green Story	Minnijean Brown	TV movie
1993	Jack the Bear	Sondra	
1993	Younger and Younger	Jaime-Lee	
1993	Sister Act 2: Back in the Habit	Classroom Kid	
1996	Rebound: The Legend of Earl "The Goat" Manigault	Evonne	TV movie
1997	The Ditchdigger's Daughters	Linda	TV movie
1997	Damn Whitey	Young Woman	Short
1998	The Players Club	Ebony	
1998	Park Day	Tamala Davis	
1999	The Best Man	Mia Morgan	
1999	Intimate Betrayal	Reese Delaware	TV movie
2000	Love & Basketball	Kerry	
2000	Nature Boy	Maria Cole	TV movie
2001	Faux Pas	-	
2002	Turnaround	Cammy	
2002	Civil Brand	Wet	
2002	Trois 2: Pandora's Box	Dr. Mia DuBois	
2003	Love Chronicles	Maya	
2003	Gang of Roses	Rachel	
2004	Justice	Sharice	
2005	The Salon	Brenda	
2005	Friends and Lovers	Debra	Video
2013	The Best Man Holiday	Mia M. Sullivan	
2016	Everything But A Man	Vanessa	
2016	No Regrets	Nina Thomas	
2020	Leroy	Joey	
2023	Deadly Entanglement	Deidra	

=== Television ===
Year	Title	Role	Notes
1989	CBS Schoolbreak Special	Vonette	Episode: "15 and Getting Straight"
1990–91	Bagdad Cafe	Debbie	Main Cast
1992	The Jacksons: An American Dream	Rebbie Jackson	Episode: "Part 1 & 2"
1992	CBS Schoolbreak Special	Carol	Episode: "Different Worlds: A Story of Interracial Love"
1993	A Different World	Yolanda	Episode: "Homey, Don't Ya Know Me?"
1993	Where I Live	Kaiya	Episode: "Big Mon on Campus"
1994	Sweet Justice	Kara	Episode: "Fourth Quarter"
1995	CBS Schoolbreak Special	Temple Baham	Episode: "What About Your Friends"
1996	The Wayans Bros.	Vanessa	Episode: "Unbrotherly Love"
1997	Good News	Cynthia Porter	Episode: "Try a Little Tenderness"
1998	The Jamie Foxx Show	Kim	Episode: "Swing Out Sister"
2000	Malcolm & Eddie	Helena	Episode: "Moving Violations"
2003	NYPD Blue	Denise Woodson	Episode: "I Kid You Not"
2003	Strong Medicine	Paige Wheeler	Episode: "Coming Clean"
2006	Grey's Anatomy	Mrs. Wood	Episode: "Break on Through"
2006	Everybody Hates Chris	Charlotte	Episode: "Everybody Hates Funerals"
2007	Dirt	Chelle	Episode: "Pilot"
2008	Cold Case	Phoebe Curtis (1989)	Episode: "Triple Threat"
2009–11	Diary of a Single Mom	Ocean	Main Cast
2017	The New Edition Story	Patricia Tresvant	Episode: "Part 1 & 2"
2022	The Best Man: The Final Chapters	Mia Sullivan	Recurring Cast
