= Go for Broke (2002 film) =

- Theatrical release poster
- Directed by: Jean-Claude La Marre
- Written by: Jean-Claude La Marre
- Produced by: Jean-Claude La Marre; Pras
- Starring: Pras Michel; Michael A. Goorjian; LisaRaye; Kira Madallo Sesay; Bobby Brown
- Cinematography: Cort Fey
- Edited by: Skip Spiro
- Music by: Michael Cohen; Flexx
- Distributed by: Artisan Entertainment
- Release date: June 27, 2002
- Running time: 106 minutes
- Countries: United States; France; Germany
- Language: English

Go for Broke is a 2002 urban comedy film, written by Jean-Claude La Marre, who also directed and co-produced the film, which stars Pras, Michael A. Goorjian, LisaRaye, Kira Madallo Sesay and Bobby Brown.

== Plot ==
Two guys have the winning ticket in a lottery, but the ticket is taken by a woman robbing the restaurant they're in, who swallows the ticket before getting arrested. The guys come up with a scheme to recover the ticket by committing a felony while impersonating women so as to be sent to the same women's penitentiary as the robber.

== Sequel ==
In 2005 Go for Broke 2 was released, produced by Kira Madallo Sesay.

== Cast ==
- Pras Michel as Jackson/Jackie
- Michael A. Goorjian as Rome/Romie(as Michael Goorjian)
- LisaRaye McCoy as Belinda/Star(as LisaRaye)
- Bobby Brown as Jive
- Glenn Plummer as Ramses
- Ed Lauter as Warden Lessen
- Kira Madallo Sesay as Venom
