= Heebie Jeebies (film) =

2013 film by Thomas L. Callaway

- Written by: Trent Haaga
- Directed by: Thomas L. Callaway
- Starring: Robert Belushi; Cathy Shim; Evie Thompson; Olivia Ku; Lucille Soong; Michael Badalucco; Carl Savering
- Music by: Andrew Morgan Smith
- Country of origin: United States
- Original language: English

Production
- Producers: H. Daniel Gross; Brad Krevoy
- Editor: Ashley Fabre
- Running time: 85 minutes
- Production company: Motion Picture Corporation of America (MPCA)

Original release
- Network: Syfy Channel
- Release: February 9, 2013

Heebie Jeebies is a 2013 American science fiction horror film directed by Thomas L. Callaway and written by Trent Haaga. The film stars Robert Belushi, Cathy Shim, Evie Thompson, Olivia Ku, Lucille Soong, Michael Badalucco and Carl Savering.

== Plot ==
In the town of Golderton, crooked businessman Billy Butler (Michael Badalucco), reopens an abandoned gold mine. It was closed after five miners were trapped in the mine sometime in the 1800s. Centuries later, Butler, a descendant of the mine's owner, reopens it, unaware of the curse that was cast upon the site. A creature, a monstrosity composed of the bodies of five deceased miners, awakens with the desire to kill anyone who takes its gold. Two local policemen (Carl Savering and Robert Belushi) and a coroner (Cathy Shim), whose family has ties to the mine, team up to try to defeat the creature before Golderton becomes a ghost town full of lifeless bodies.

== Cast ==
- Robert Belushi as Todd Crane
- Cathy Shim as Theresa Lim
- Evie Thompson as Veronica Crane
- Olivia Ku as Tracy Lim
- Lucille Soong as Zu Mu
- Michael Badalucco as Billy Butler
- Dave Randolph-Mayhem Davis as Mace
- Carl Savering as Sheriff Tatum
- Marion Ross as Agnes Whitehead
- Jennifer Rubin as Eve Moore
- Kim Collins as Tommy
- Tyler Forrest as Rick

== Release ==
Heebie Jeebies premiered on the SyFy Channel on September 9, 2013.

=== Home media ===
The film was released on DVD by Sony Pictures on June 25, 2013.

== Reception ==
Debi Moore from Dread Central gave the film a score of 1.5 out of 5, criticizing the film's script, and lack of likable characters. Christopher Armstead from Film Critics United gave the film a mixed review, writing, "It’s not art, not that we know art anyway, and the title is stupid, but Heebie Jeebies was more than functional, low brow, SyFy style entertainment."
