= The Salon (film) =

- Promotional poster
- Directed by: Mark Brown
- Written by: Mark Brown; Shelley Garrett
- Produced by: David Odom; Breht Gardner; Brent Odom; Carl Craig; David Odom; Lita Richardson; Mark Brown; Vivica A. Fox; Zatella Beatty
- Starring: Vivica A. Fox; Darrin Henson; Dondre Whitfield; Kym Whitley; Monica Calhoun
- Cinematography: Brandon Trost
- Edited by: Earl Watson
- Distributed by: CodeBlack Entertainment; Freestyle Releasing
- Release dates: January 2005 (Sundance Film Festival); May 11, 2007 (United States)
- Running time: 90 minutes
- Country: United States
- Language: English
- Budget: $1.5 million
- Box office: $139,084

The Salon is a 2005 comedy-drama film, directed by Mark Brown, executive produced by David Odom, and starring Vivica A. Fox, Kym Whitley, and Monica Calhoun. It was filmed in Baltimore, Maryland.

The Salon is an independent feature film that was developed, financed and produced by Howard University graduates David Odom and Mark Brown.

== Plot ==
Jenny Smith owns a modest neighborhood beauty parlor that is hugely popular with the folks who reside on her street, but mom-and-pop businesses are failing and a corporate giant has been clamoring to set up shop on the block. Despite formidable pressure from the Department of Water and Power, Jenny refuses to accept the offer made for her shop and decides to test her luck against the DWP in the local courthouse.

== Cast ==
- Vivica A. Fox as Jenny Smith
- Brooke Burns as Tami
- Darrin Henson as Michael
- De'Angelo Wilson as D.D.
- Dondre Whitfield as Ricky
- Garrett Morris as Percy
- Kym Whitley as Lashaunna
- Monica Calhoun as Brenda
- Sheila Cutchlow as Kandy
- Taral Hicks as Trina
- Terrence Howard as Patrick
- Tiffany Adams as Wanda

== Reception ==
On review aggregator website Rotten Tomatoes the film has a score of 12% based on reviews from 33 critics, with an average rating of 3.6/10.

The A.V. Club's Tasha Robinson gave it a grade "D−".

Ed Gonzalez of Slant Magazine gave it 1 star out of 4, stating that "I've seen porn with better dialogue and SNL sketches with less amateur production values".

Maitland McDonagh gave a positive review "The film's feisty cast and generally sunny outlook make for warm and reassuring comfort viewing, the equivalent of a straight-from-the-box dish of mac and cheese".

== See also ==
- Barbershop (film)
- Beauty Shop

== Bibliography ==
- Catsoulis, Jeannette (May 10, 2007). "Cutting Hair and Cutting Remarks". The New York Times.
- Leydon, Joe (February 3, 2005). "The Salon". Variety.
