= De'Angelo Wilson =

American actor (1979–2008)

- Born: March 29, 1979; Dayton, Ohio, U.S.
- Died: November 26, 2008 (aged 29); Los Angeles, California, U.S.
- Occupations: Actor, rapper
- Years active: 2002–2008

De'Angelo Wilson (March 29, 1979 – November 26, 2008) was an American film and television actor and rapper. He was best known for his role as DJ Iz in the 2002 hip hop drama film 8 Mile.

== Early life ==
Wilson was born in Dayton, Ohio. He attended the University of Cincinnati and Kent State University, in Kent, Ohio, where he studied acting.

== Career ==
Wilson appeared in four films, including as DJ Iz in 8 Mile (2002) and as Jesse (age 19) in Antwone Fisher (2002). He also appeared in two television productions.

== Death ==
Wilson died by suicide by hanging in Los Angeles in 2008.

== Filmography ==
=== Film ===
Year	Title	Role	Notes
2002	8 Mile	DJ Iz	
2002	Antwone Fisher	Jesse Age 19	
2005	The Salon	D.D.	
2006	Mercy Street	Juilius	
2012	Falling Away	Juilius	Posthumous release; final film role

=== Television ===
Year	Film	Role	Notes
2004	CSI: NY	Lamar Adams	Episode: "Outside Man"
2002	R.U.S./H.	Terrell	Unsold television pilot
2006	The Shield	Marcus "M.C. Gond Good" Dunn	Episode: "Kavanaugh" (as De'Angelo K. Wilson)
