= LisaRaye McCoy =

American actress

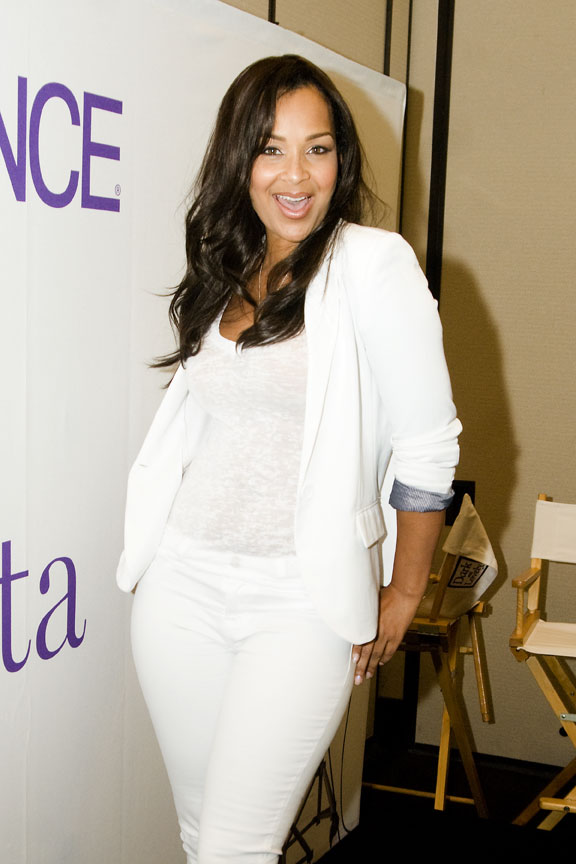
- McCoy in 2010
- Born: September 23, 1967 (age 59); Chicago, Illinois, U.S.
- Other names: LisaRaye; LRaye; LR; LisaRaye McCoy-Misick
- Education: Eastern Illinois University
- Occupation: Actress
- Years active: 1992–present
- Spouses: Tony Martin (m. 1992; div. 1994) Michael Misick (m. 2006; div. 2008)
- Partner: Kenji Pace (1988–1990)
- Children: 1
- Relatives: [[Jelahn McCoy & Cynthia McCoy] (half-sister)

LisaRaye McCoy (born September 23, 1967), known as LisaRaye, is an American actress. She is best known for portraying Diana "Diamond" Armstrong in the 1998 film The Players Club, Neesee James on the UPN/The CW sitcom All of Us from 2003 until 2007 and Keisha Greene in the VH1 romantic comedy series Single Ladies which originally aired from 2011 to 2015. She was also married to Michael Misick, the first Premier of the Turks and Caicos Islands, from 2006 until 2010; during that time she served as First Lady of Turks and Caicos.

== Biography ==
=== Early life ===
McCoy was born in Chicago, Illinois. McCoy is the daughter of David Ray McCoy, a Chicago businessman, and Katie McCoy, a former professional model. Her paternal half-sisters are Jelahn McCoy and Cynthia McCoy Scott. McCoy is the paternal half-sister of Da Brat. Growing up on the south side of Chicago, McCoy attended St. James College Prep school, Kenwood Academy and later, Thornridge High School, graduating in 1986. After high school, McCoy attended Eastern Illinois University before pursuing an acting career.

=== Career ===
McCoy made her acting debut as the lead in Reasons, an independent film directed by Monty Ross. McCoy is perhaps best known for her role as Diamond in The Players Club, directed and written by Ice Cube. She also appeared in The Wood, opposite Taye Diggs, Rhapsody, All About You, and Go for Broke. In 2003, McCoy starred as Neesee James in the UPN/ The CW sitcom All of Us, where she played Duane Martin's ex-wife. The series ended in 2007. McCoy began her career as a model for fashion, but before that she was married to Archie Amerson. She did shows in churches and high schools in her native Chicago. In addition to acting, McCoy has also appeared in dozens of music videos, including "Know Filter 2" by Shleah, Tugoa, T.Lee, "Download" by Lil' Kim, Changing Faces's "Same Tempo", Ginuwine's "Last Chance", Ludacris' "Number 1 Spot", Calvin Richardson's “True Love”, Sisqó's "Incomplete", Lil Jon and Ice Cube's "Roll Call", "I Don't Wanna See" and "I Really Want to Sex Your Body”, by Link, Tupac Shakur's "Toss It Up", "Never Be The Same Again" by Ghostface Killah & Carl Thomas, "Unpredictable" by Jamie Foxx, ”Ooohhhwwweee” by Master P, “Slip N' Slide” by Danny Boy, and "Are You in the Mood" by Teddy & Dru Down. She also had a cameo in Seven's music video "Girls" & Jaheim's music video "Back Tight Wit You" McCoy also recorded the single "Would You?" with rapper Benzino. In 2005, McCoy launched two fashion lines: Luxe & Romance, a lingerie line that was introduced during New York's Fashion Week, and Xraye, a jeans line for women. In 2011, she launched her jean collection "The LisaRaye Collection" in partnership with PZI Jeans, and a hair line, "LisaRaye Glamour"; That same year, she was the Ambassador/Grand Marshal for the 70th Magic City Classic parade and football game in Birmingham, Alabama.

== Personal life ==
McCoy has a daughter named Kai Morae Pace (born December 5, 1989) with Kenji Pace. In 1992, McCoy married American football player Tony Martin. They divorced in 1994. In April 2006, McCoy married Michael Misick, who had been elected the Premier of the Turks and Caicos Islands (a position previously known as Chief Minister of the Turks and Caicos Islands), in 2003. They were married in a lavish ceremony before 300 guests, followed by a three-week honeymoon to Jerusalem, Bali and Dubai. During their marriage, McCoy's title was "First Lady of the Turks and Caicos." In August 2008, Premier Misick released a statement announcing that he and McCoy were divorcing. Misick resigned from office in March 2009 after an investigation found "clear signs of corruption", involving the selling-off of public land to fund his own investments. He fled the Turks and Caicos, and was eventually arrested in Brazil, where he was extradited back to the islands to stand trial.

McCoy is a convert to Christianity.

=== "Queen Mother of Ghana" claims ===
McCoy has inaccurately referred to herself as the "Queen Mother" of Ghana on multiple occasions, including during a 2019 appearance on The Wendy Williams Show. Her remarks, along with the lax and uncritical reporting of American media outlets in response, were widely mocked on Ghanaian social media, with journalist Nana Aba Anamoah accusing her of "ignorance"; Anamoah further stated that the title does not exist in the country, as Ghana is a republic and not a monarchy. McCoy was allegedly crowned "queen mother" during a ceremony at a Los Angeles nightclub, in September 2019. She was given the supposed title by Yahweh ben Yahweh ben Yahweh, a self-proclaimed "imperial king" and former member of a hip-hop group from Orange County, Florida. McCoy, at the time, stated that "To have such an honor bestowed upon me by my own African people is a testament to my hard work and character". Yahweh, who refers to himself as "The Imperial Majesty King Yahweh The Holy Ghost", purchased the title of nkosuohene from a chief of the small town of Kwanyako in Ghana's Central Region.

McCoy visited Kwanyako herself in July 2021, promising to finance a vocational centre for women and a local performance troupe.

== Filmography ==
=== Film ===
Year	Title	Role	Notes
1996	Reasons	Iris	
1998	The Players Club	Diana "Diamond" Armstrong	
1999	The Wood	Lisa	
2000	The Cheapest Movie Ever Made	Brenda	
2000	Rhapsody	Victoria	TV movie
2001	Date from Hell	Keisha	Short
2001	All About You	Lisa	
2002	Civil Brand	Frances Shepard	
2002	Go for Broke	Belinda/Star	
2003	Love Chronicles	Marie Toursaant	
2003	Gang of Roses	Maria	
2004	Super Spy	CIA Lady	Video
2005	Beauty Shop	Rochelle	
2005	The Proud Family Movie	Choreographer (Voice)	TV movie
2005	Envy	Tasha	
2009	Contradictions of the Heart	Kiki	
2011	Video Girl	Patricia	
2012	The Promise	Ms. Fuller	Short
2014	Lap Dance	Sugar	
2015	Skinned	Mother	
2016	Love Under New Management: The Miki Howard Story	Sylvia Rhone	TV movie
2018	No More Mr Nice Guy	Bridget St. John	
2019	Love Dot Com: The Social Experiment	Deloris Quinn	
2020	Holiday Heartbreak	Summer St. John	TV movie
2021	Twice Bitten	Monique	
2021	For the Love of Money	Dahlia	
2021	In the Gray	Renee	Short
2022	Greed: A Seven Deadly Sins Story	Miss Viv	TV movie
2022	Chocolate City 3: Live Tour	Shawna Diva	
2022	You Married Dat	Dr. Reid	
2022	The Royal	Elsie	
2022	Single Not Searching	Angela	
2024	Lunar Lockdown	Warden Meyers	
2026	The Dreamer Cinderella	Camille Garber	
2026	Deb is Boss	Amelia	

=== Television ===
Year	Title	Role	Notes
1995	Martin	Swinger Woman	Episode: "Swing Thing"
1997	In the House	Delivery Woman	Episode: "Saint Marion" & "Abstinence Makes the Heart Grow Fonder"
2001-02	Source: All Access	Herself/Host	Main Host
2002	The It Factor	Herself	Episode: "Unaired Pilot"
2002	Teen Summit	Herself	Episode: "Video Girls"
2003	The It Factor: Los Angeles	Herself	Episode: "Mali Finn Casts 9 New Actors"
2003-07	All of Us	Neesee James	Main Cast
2004	Faking It	Herself	Episode: "Three 'R's to Protecting Stars"
2005	Steve Harvey's Big Time Challenge	Herself	Episode: "Episode #2.14"
2005	Turn Up the Heat with G. Garvin	Herself	Episode: "Meals in Minutes"
2006	Trumpet Awards	Herself/Host	Main Host
2008	Hollywood Trials	Herself	Episode: "Episode #1.6"
2010	Trumpet Awards	Herself/Co-Host	Main Co-Host
2010	Life After	Herself	Episode: "Elise Neal"
2010-11	LisaRaye: The Real McCoy	Herself	Main Cast
2011	Hawthorne	Chandra	Episode: "Just Between Friends"
2011-15	Single Ladies	Keisha Greene	Main Cast
2013	Hell's Kitchen	Herself	Episode: "9 Chefs Compete"
2015	She's Got Game	Herself	Episode: "Surprise, Surprise" & "Game Over"
2016	Being	Herself	Episode: "LisaRaye McCoy"
2017	Hip Hop Squares	Herself/Contestant	Episode: "BBD vs SWV" & "Da Brat vs LisaRaye"
2017	Face Value	Herself/Team Captain	Episode: "Al Shearer vs. LisaRaye McCoy"
2017-18	Ballers	Amber's Mother	Guest Cast: Season 3-4
2018	Black Card Revoked	Herself	Episode: "LisaRaye, Affion Crockett, K. Dubb"
2018	The Proposal	Herself	Episode: "103"
2018-25	The Family Business	Donna Duncan	Guest: Season 1, Recurring Cast: Season 2-4, Main Cast: Season 5-6
2019	Growing Up Hip Hop: Atlanta	Herself	Episode: "So So Triggered" & "Firestorm"
2019	Murder in the Thirst	Herself/Host	Main Host
2019	Uncensored	Herself	Episode: "LisaRaye McCoy"
2019	You Hittin Dat	Dr. Reid	Recurring Cast
2019	Huge in France	Dr. Rose	Episode: "Episode Six"
2019	Tales	Mavis	Episode: "Brothers"
2019	South Side	Herself	Episode: "Mild Sauce Meatballs"
2020	Iyanla, Fix My Life	Herself	Episode: "LisaRaye McCoy: 3 Generations, 1 Family Breakdown"
2020-23	Cocktails with Queens	Herself/Co-Host	Main Co-Host
2020-23	A House Divided	Alexis	Main Cast: Season 2-5
2021	Dish Nation	Herself/Guest Host	Recurring Guest Host: Season 10
2023	Asking for a Friend	Herself/Host	Main Host
2023	Legacy	Debra Simmons	Main Cast

=== Music videos ===
Year	Song	Artist
1995	"Are You in the Mood"	Teddy featuring Dru Down and Luniz
1995	"Mindblowing"	David Josias
1995	"With You"	Somethin' for the People
1996	"Toss It Up"	2Pac featuring Danny Boy, K-Ci & JoJo and Aaron Hall
1996	"Slip N' Slide"	Danny Boy featuring Tha Dogg Pound
1998	"Same Tempo"	Changing Faces
1998	"I Really Want to Sex Your Body"	Link
1998	"I Don’t Wanna See"	Link
1998	”Thugz Cry"	Bizzy Bone
1999	"True Love"	Calvin Richardson
1999	“Crave”	Marc Dorsey
2000	"Incomplete"	Sisqó
2001	"Never Be the Same Again"	Ghostface Killah featuring Raekwon and Carl Thomas
2001	"Ooohhhwwweee"	Master P featuring Weebie
2003	"Backtight"	Jaheim
2003	"Would You?"	Benzino featuring LisaRaye and Mario Winans
2004	"Roll Call"	Lil Jon & the East Side Boyz featuring Ice Cube
2005	"Number One Spot"	Ludacris
2005	"Unpredictable"	Jamie Foxx featuring Ludacris
2009	"Download"	Lil' Kim
2009	"Last Chance"	Ginuwine
2009	"Girls"	Seven featuring Lil' Kim
2013	"Age Ain't A Factor"	Jaheim
2021	"Friends and Family"	The Isley Brothers featuring Snoop Dogg

=== Stage ===
- If These Hips Could Talk (2003)
- The Vagina Monologues (2006)
- You Gonna Make Me Love Somebody Else (2006)
- Gossip, Lies & Secrets (2007)
- Married But Single (2016)
- Married But Single Too (2017)

== Award nominations ==
Year	Award	Category	Work	Result	Refs
2007	NAACP Image Awards	Outstanding Supporting Actress in a Comedy Series	All of Us	Nominated	

== See also ==
- Hip hop models
