= Super Spy (film) =

- Directed by: A.J. Jamal
- Written by: A.J. Jamal
- Produced by: A.J. Jamal, Karyn Kobayashi
- Starring: A.J. Jamal; LisaRaye; Reynaldo Rey; Conchita Leeflang; Karyn Kobayashi
- Cinematography: Darryl Walthall
- Music by: Fahad Behroozi
- Distributed by: Warner Bros. Lightyear Entertainment
- Release date: 2004
- Running time: 135 minutes
- Country: United States
- Language: English

Super Spy is an American comedy film written, produced and directed by A.J. Jamal and starring A.J. Jamal, LisaRaye, Reynaldo Rey, Conchita Leeflang.

== Premise ==
An aspiring screenwriter is determined to make a low budget action film. While filming it, he films a crime being committed and is then hunted down by a band of criminals.
