= Conchita Leeflang =

Surinamese American musician and actress

- Born: Paramaribo, Suriname
- Occupations: Model, singer, actress, author, inventor
- Height: 5 ft 9 in (175 cm)
- Partner: Kid Rock (ex)
- Children: 1 daughter
- Parent(s): Franklin Leeflang; Ursila Leeflang
- Website: conchitaleeflang.com

Conchita Leeflang is a Surinamese-American actress, model and singer.

== Biography ==
Born in Paramaribo, Suriname, Leeflang was the daughter of Frank Leeflang, who was also the Minister of Internal affairs and Justice, and the temporary Prime Minister of Suriname. Leeflang moved to Brussels, Belgium at a very young age, where her father was the Ambassador. Leeflang is multilingual, speaking English, Dutch, French, German, Spanish, Surinamese and Italian.

She has been a singer, model, and stage actress for many years until she moved to Los Angeles on a modeling contract where she decided to pursue Television and Film. Some of her acting credits are Super Spy, Sliders, Baywatch, The X Show, The call of a Siren, The Women of the Tropics and De Vrouw van Jerry (Dutch).

Leeflang has been a recording artist for many years in Europe, where two of her albums went gold, and two went Platinum. She was also involved in many different projects: a duo with Plastic Bertrand, Black Kiss The Bang Gang, and many more. She has appeared in many TV programs, like MTV, Zapper ne pas Jouer, Jacque Martin, and top of the pops, and in 2004, the documentary The Youngest Guns featured her song "This is My Life". Conchita joined the cast of Nederlandse Hollywood Vrouwen as one of the four women in their second season in 8 episodes, after doing an appearance in season one which aired on net5. The remaining cast consist of Inge, Yolanda Foster and Myrthe Mylius.

Leeflang had a relationship with singer Kid Rock lasting a little more than a year.

Leeflang is the mother of one child.

== Published works ==
=== Discography ===
- Conchita Leeflang "Hoshana, Don't fade away" (1988)
- Black Kiss Featuring Conchita, Jump on the floor
- Black Kiss Featuring Conchita, Fun Boy' (1990)
- Black Kiss Featuring Conchita, Time out (1990)
- Club Control feat. Plastic Bertrand, 'House Machine (1991)
- Bang Gang* Featuring Conchita, Bang Gang Night (1995)
- Conchita Leeflang* This is my life (2004)
- Conchita Leeflang* Broken Wings (2014) Cover from Mr. Mister
- Conchita Leeflang* I brake before i fall (2016)

=== Filmography ===
- 1998: Sliders (Secretary, episode "Virtual Slide")
- 2000: The Cheapest Movie Ever Made (Bond girl)
- 2003: Performing as... (Tina Turner)
- 2004: Super Spy (Stephanie)
- 2006: Unbeatable Harold (Ursula)
- 2012: "Nederlandse Hollywood vrouwen"
- 2014: "Children of divorced parents" Song
