= Forrest Wheeler =

American actor (born 2004)

- Wheeler at the 2017 "Fox LA Screenings Gala" Red Carpet
- Born: March 21, 2004 (age 22); Santa Monica, California, U.S.
- Education: New York University
- Occupation: Actor
- Years active: 2013–present

Forrest Wheeler
- Traditional Chinese: 韋智林
- Simplified Chinese: 韦智林
Transcriptions
Standard Mandarin
- Hanyu Pinyin: Wéi Zhìlín

Forrest Wheeler (born March 21, 2004) is an American actor. In 2014, he was cast as Emery Huang, a series regular on the ABC comedy series Fresh Off the Boat.

== Career ==
Wheeler began his acting career at the age of seven when he booked the role of a Cambodian boy in the film The Incredible Burt Wonderstone, opposite Steve Buscemi, who presented him with a rabbit as a pet that Wheeler's character took home to his family for dinner.

He performed on commercials and several television shows and movies before landing a role as a series regular on the ABC comedy series Fresh Off the Boat. He lays the middle son of the Huang family alongside his television parents Randall Park and Constance Wu.

Wheeler appeared on the Hallmark Channel's Home and Family on March 3, 2015, where he talked about Fresh off the Boat. The series premiered on February 4, 2015.

On October 28, 2015, Entertainment Weekly included Wheeler in the "12 Under 12: The Best Child Actors of 2015".

In 2016, Wheeler collaborated with Fresh off the Boat costars Hudson Yang, Ian Chen, and ISAtv (founded by Wong Fu Productions) to produce a web series focusing on the interests of the Asian American Youth community in the hope of inspiring the youth from all over the world to go out and be active and curious. In "The Forrest Wheeler Adventures" series, Wheeler goes on a quest to learn what it takes to become an action hero.

On December 19, 2017, Wheeler hosted Kore Asian Media's 16th annual "Unforgettable Gala's" Fresh Off the Carpet event where he interviewed award recipients and celebrities including Maggie Q and Ross Butler.

On August 8, 2018, The Hollywood Reporter named Wheeler among "Hollywood's Top 30 Stars Under Age 18".

== Personal life ==
Wheeler was born on March 21, 2004, in Santa Monica, California to a Chinese-American mixed family. He speaks Cantonese at home and studies Mandarin in school. He graduated Campbell Hall School in 2022 and currently attends New York University.

Wheeler is a martial artist and competed in the 2014 US Open ISKA World Martial Arts Championships where he won seven 1st places. He earned his first Karate black belt in 2015, and a second black belt in Extreme Martial Arts (XMA) in 2016.

== Media ==
=== Television ===
Year	Title	Role	Notes
2013	Mortal Kombat: Legacy	Young Kuai Liang	Recurring role; 2 episodes
2014	New Girl	Kid	Episode: Exes; uncredited
2014	Community	Kid #2	Episode: "G.I. Jeff"
2014	Chasing Life	Boy	Episode: The Family the Lies Together; uncredited
2015—2020	Fresh Off the Boat	Emery Huang	Series regular; 116 episodes
2017	Sofia the First	Prince Jin	Episode: The Mystic Isles: The Falcon's Eye; voice role
2018	Paradise Run	Himself - Contestant	Episode: Fresh Off the Run

=== Film ===
Year	Title	Role	Notes
2013	Boomerang	Jeremy	TV movie
2013	The Incredible Burt Wonderstone	Cambodian Boy	
2015	Such Good People	Little Kuenlay/Little Kuenphay	
2016	Power Play	Billy	Short film

== Awards ==
Year	Award	Category	Work	Result	Ref
2015	Vulture Awards	Best Child Actor	Fresh Off the Boat	Nominated	
2016	Young Artist Award	Outstanding Young Ensemble Cast in a Television Series	Fresh Off the Boat	Won	
2016	Young Entertainer Awards	Best Young Ensemble Cast - TV Series	Fresh Off the Boat	Won	
2017	Young Artist Award	Best Performance in a TV Series - Leading Young Actor	Fresh Off the Boat	Nominated	
