= Beckinfield =

- Genre: Sci-Fi
- Created by: Bob Gebert
- Country of origin: United States
- Original language: English
- No. of seasons: 2

Original release
- Release: November 29, 2010 – May 24, 2013

Beckinfield was an ongoing science fiction web series created by actor Bob Gebert, designer Tracy Evans and company CEO Biff van Cleve. Similar to The Guild in that Beckinfield posted new entries in its series online instead of on television, Beckinfield was nonetheless different in that actors can participate from all over the world. The site allowed any user to join for free and carried no advertising. The site (and the series it hosted) were similar to YouTube in that users were able to upload videos, but unlike YouTube in that all the videos were part of an interconnected story.

== Premise ==
For her high school's "On the Map" project, student Rose Banter invites citizens of the town to share about their lives in online video diaries. The project was designed to draw attention and tourism to the town through the citizens' potentially charming or slice-of-life stories. However, people would open up about the strange and unusual occurrences in the town.

== Behind the scenes ==
Users of the site created characters who then related the events in the fictional town to their audiences. (The story points were given to them in weekly e-mails by Gebert.) The users (actors) could then have their characters give their opinions or perspectives on the town's events, or talk about their character's own story points. The site billed itself as "Mass Participation TV". On Mashable.com, writer Kate Freeman described it in her headline as "a YouTube Show with 4,000 Actors."

The actors' videos were then compiled into a weekly video entitled "Previously on Beckinfield".

Beckinfield did not observe "seasons" of stories the way that most prime-time network series do, or even abbreviated seasons like those of The Guild. The format was much more open-ended, similar to the format of a daily television soap opera.

In February 2012, there were 3,727 registered participants on the site.

Industry professionals who were involved with Beckinfield included writer and story editor Marc Scott Zicree, casting director Scott David, and actor/director Jonathan Frakes.

In late 2011, Beckinfield founders hosted "The Ultimate Online Audition Contest" where actors who play characters in the fictional town audition, as their character, for a play based on founders Bradford Beckin, his daughter Becca Beckin, and others. There was a $10,000 grand prize given out and 18 $200 prizes went to finalists in the contest. Frakes, playing a character called Dylan Marks, chose the winner.

Gebert moved on to other projects in May 2013, bringing Beckinfield to a close. The final "Previously on Beckinfield" compilation was titled "Destiny." The parent site to Beckinfield, Theatrics.com, hosted stories written by other people for a while thereafter before becoming defunct itself.
