= Gang of Roses =

2003 film

- Directed by: Jean-Claude La Marre
- Written by: Jean-Claude La Marre
- Produced by: Brian "Skinny B." Lewis; Doug Schwab; Jean-Claude La Marre; Jesse H. Rivard; Kim Percival; Larry Rattner; Lila Aviv; Liz La Marre; Matt R. Brady; Tim Swain
- Starring: Monica Calhoun; Lil' Kim; LisaRaye; Marie Matiko; Stacey Dash
- Cinematography: Ben Kufrin
- Music by: Michael Cohen
- Distributed by: Lionsgate
- Release date: October 10, 2003
- Running time: 105 minutes
- Country: United States
- Language: English
- Box office: $400,000

Gang of Roses is a 2003 Western action drama film written and directed by Jean-Claude La Marre. It starred Monica Calhoun, Lil' Kim, LisaRaye, Charity Hill, Bobby Brown, Stacey Dash and Marie Matiko. The movie took just 18 days to film.

The film was followed by a sequel, Gang of Roses II: Next Generation (2012).

== Plot ==
The film starts off with Left Eye Watkins and his gang attempting to bully Sheriff Shoeshine Michel into giving them gold and women. A female member of the gang is extremely enthusiastic about the women and sets out to rape a can-can girl in the middle of town. While resisting, the can-can cuts the female gang member who in turns shoots her in the middle of the road.

The can-can girl happens to be the sister of Rachel (Calhoun), the protagonist. Rachel, a religious, reformed bad girl, rounds up her former gang members, Kim (Dash), Zang Li (Matiko), Chastity (Lil' Kim), and Maria (LisaRaye), to seek revenge. They are followed by a blacked haired lady who is also seeking revenge upon Chastity.

== Cast ==
- Monica Calhoun as Rachel
- Stacey Dash as Kim
- LisaRaye as Maria
- Marie Matiko as Zang Li
- Lil' Kim as Chastity
- Bobby Brown as "Left Eye" Watkins
- Louis Mandylor as Sheriff "Shoeshine" Michel
- Jacinto Taras Riddick as Georgy Simone
- Charity Hill as Suzie "Little Suzie"
- Glenn Plummer as Johnny "Handsome"
- Macy Gray as Black Haired Woman
- Mario Van Peebles as Jessie Lee
