= Paradise Run =

- Genre: Reality competition
- Written by: Scott A. Stone; Julio Vincent Gambuto; Jay Wolff
- Directed by: Sean Travis; Steve Grant; Peter Ney
- Presented by: Daniella Monet
- Theme music composer: Stuart Hart; Trevor Simpson
- Country of origin: United States
- Original language: English
- No. of seasons: 3
- No. of episodes: 70

Production
- Executive producers: Scott A. Stone; Marcus Fox
- Producers: Julio Vincent Gambuto; Jay Wolff
- Running time: 23 minutes
- Production company: Nickelodeon Productions

Original release
- Network: Nickelodeon
- Release: February 1, 2016 – January 26, 2018

Paradise Run is an American reality competition television program that aired on Nickelodeon from February 1, 2016 to January 26, 2018. The program is presented by Daniella Monet.

== Premise ==
At the Hilton Waikoloa Village in Hawaii, three teams of two children race around the area competing in three different challenges that are given to them by host Daniella Monet through tablets that are provided for them. The teams are sorted by Team Makani, which is Hawaiian for "wind", Team Nalu, which is Hawaiian for "wave", and Team Ahi, which is Hawaiian for "fire". After following the given directions to complete each challenge, they must grab a souvenir, take a selfie with it on their tablet and send it to Daniella. Once all three challenges are completed, they must solve a riddle to the location of the finish line. The riddle's answer is a suite where Daniella and the parents of the teams are waiting, and the team must race there. The first team to reach the finish line wins a four-day, three-night trip at the hotel while the runners-up receive consolation prizes.

== Production ==
Paradise Run was picked up by Nickelodeon in December 2015, when it was announced that Daniella Monet would be the host of the program. The program features three teams of children competing against each other in a series of challenges at a Hawaiian resort. It was announced by Nickelodeon that the program would premiere on February 1, 2016. The program is produced by Nickelodeon and Stone Stanley Entertainment, who had previously produced Legends of the Hidden Temple, another Nickelodeon game show in the 1990s. On March 29, 2016, a casting call went out for children on Maui to audition to be contestants on a second season of Paradise Run, for a scheduled filming in May–June 2016. The second season premiered on November 14, 2016. The program was renewed for a third season by Nickelodeon on March 9, 2017. The third season premiered on November 13, 2017.

== Episodes ==
=== Series overview ===
Season	Episodes	Originally released	
Season	Episodes	First released	Last released
1	20	February 1, 2016	February 29, 2016
2	20	November 14, 2016	January 26, 2017
3	30	November 13, 2017	January 26, 2018

=== Season 1 (2016) ===
No. overall	No. in season	Title	Original release date	Prod. code	U.S. viewers (millions)
1	1	"Besties"	February 1, 2016	105	1.46
2	2	"Dig, Slide and Toss"	February 2, 2016	115	1.43
3	3	"Girl Power"	February 3, 2016	118	1.52
4	4	"Puzzled Tiki"	February 4, 2016	107	1.50
5	5	"Splish-Splash and Dash"	February 5, 2016	111	1.56
6	6	"Panic Under the Falls"	February 8, 2016	119	1.59
7	7	"Cabana-Rama Adventure"	February 9, 2016	116	1.55
8	8	"Hidden Zodiac"	February 10, 2016	101	1.40
9	9	"Where's My Charger?"	February 11, 2016	109	1.53
10	10	"What a Mess"	February 12, 2016	104	1.47
11	11	"Riddle Me This"	February 16, 2016	110	1.57
12	12	"Hula What?"	February 17, 2016	103	1.43
13	13	"Moving Statues"	February 18, 2016	113	1.41
14	14	"Raging Falls"	February 19, 2016	106	1.28
15	15	"Going Coconuts for Sand Dollars"	February 22, 2016	117	1.50
16	16	"Mix 'n' Match"	February 23, 2016	102	1.41
17	17	"Water Wonderland"	February 24, 2016	120	1.44
18	18	"Are We There Yet?"	February 25, 2016	108	1.52
19	19	"Puzzles in Paradise"	February 26, 2016	112	1.30
20	20	"What's Apple-Pine?"	February 29, 2016	114	1.25

=== Season 2 (2016–17) ===
No. overall	No. in season	Title	Original release date	Prod. code	U.S. viewers (millions)
21	1	"It's All About the Thunderman!"	November 14, 2016	216	1.88
22	2	"NRDD Run for Charity"	November 15, 2016	219	1.74
23	3	"Thundermans in Paradise"	November 16, 2016	217	1.55
24	4	"NRDD in the House"	November 17, 2016	220	1.59
25	5	"A Nick Showdown in Paradise"	November 18, 2016	218	1.65
26	6	"Whose Underwear Is That?"	January 2, 2017	210	1.41
27	7	"I Scream for Ice-Cream"	January 3, 2017	205	1.49
28	8	"Lava Reception"	January 4, 2017	204	1.58
29	9	"Forgive You Not!"	January 5, 2017	215	1.48
30	10	"Crazy Lei, Crazy Time"	January 9, 2017	203	1.36
31	11	"Rocketing Rainbow Scoops"	January 10, 2017	206	1.35
32	12	"Something's Fishy"	January 11, 2017	211	1.53
33	13	"The Butt Squeeze"	January 12, 2017	213	1.58
34	14	"Zip, Launch & Fly"	January 17, 2017	201	1.48
35	15	"Paradise Express"	January 18, 2017	208	1.53
36	16	"Skip, Drip & Zip"	January 19, 2017	214	1.53
37	17	"Salute Your Frozen Butt"	January 23, 2017	212	1.45
38	18	"Very Important Party"	January 24, 2017	207	1.38
39	19	"Volcano-a-Go-Go"	January 25, 2017	209	1.51
40	20	"Can You Hear Me Now?"	January 26, 2017	202	1.28

=== Season 3 (2017–18) ===
No. overall	No. in season	Title	Original release date	Prod. code	U.S. viewers (millions)
41	1	"Thunder on the Run"	November 13, 2017	320	1.33
42	2	"Nicky, Ricky, Dicky & Run"	November 14, 2017	322	1.32
43	3	"Run Shakin' "	November 15, 2017	310	1.23
44	4	"A Rockin' Run with Thunder"	November 16, 2017	319	1.09
45	5	"Game on Game Shakers"	November 20, 2017	311	1.19
46	6	"Paradise Quad Clash"	November 20, 2017	323	1.14
47	7	"Thunder-Quad, Assemble!"	November 21, 2017	321	1.23
48	8	"School of Rockin' in Hawaii"	November 21, 2017	318	1.15
49	9	"Clash of the Nick Celebs"	November 22, 2017	317	1.17
50	10	"Game Shaking Up the Run"	November 22, 2017	309	1.06
51	11	"Shark Tooth Island Run"	January 1, 2018	304	0.94
52	12	"Island in Paradise"	January 2, 2018	308	1.17
53	13	"Paradise Island Run"	January 3, 2018	306	1.06
54	14	"Shark Tooth Surprise"	January 4, 2018	305	1.05
55	15	"Outrigger Run"	January 5, 2018	307	1.09
56	16	"Paradise on the Ropes"	January 8, 2018	316	1.05
57	17	"Paradise Raw-n"	January 9, 2018	312	1.03
58	18	"Punching in Paradise"	January 10, 2018	313	1.10
59	19	"A Superstar Showdown"	January 11, 2018	315	1.01
60	20	"Rumble Run"	January 12, 2018	314	1.07
61	21	"Fresh Off the Run"	January 16, 2018	325	1.07
62	22	"Athletes in Paradise"	January 16, 2018	330	0.91
63	23	"Big Time Run"	January 17, 2018	328	0.87
64	24	"Going for the Gold"	January 18, 2018	329	1.00
65	25	"A Modern Wimpy Fuller Run"	January 19, 2018	327	1.12
66	26	"Supersized Prizes in Paradise"	January 22, 2018	301	0.94
67	27	"A Prized Packed Run"	January 23, 2018	326	0.83
68	28	"Big Run, Big Prize"	January 24, 2018	324	0.97
69	29	"A Supersized Run"	January 25, 2018	302	0.97
70	30	"High Octane Run"	January 26, 2018	303	1.01

== Ratings ==
Viewership and ratings per season of Paradise Run
Season	Episodes	First aired		Last aired		Avg. viewers (millions)
Season	Episodes	Date	Viewers (millions)	Date	Viewers (millions)	Avg. viewers (millions)
1	20	February 1, 2016	1.46	February 29, 2016	1.25	1.46
2	20	November 14, 2016	1.88	January 26, 2017	1.28	1.52
3	30	November 13, 2017	1.33	January 26, 2018	1.01	1.07
