= Ian Chen (actor) =

American actor

- Chen in 2025
- Born: September 7, 2006 (age 20); Los Angeles, California, U.S.
- Education: Harvard University
- Occupation: Actor
- Years active: 2013–present

Chinese name
- Traditional Chinese: 陳琦燁
- Simplified Chinese: 陈琦烨
Transcriptions
Standard Mandarin
- Hanyu Pinyin: Chén Qíyè
Southern Min
- Hokkien POJ: Tân Kî-iap

Ian Chen (Chinese: 陳琦燁; born September 7, 2006) is a Taiwanese-American actor. He is known for his roles as Evan Huang in the ABC sitcom Fresh Off the Boat (2015–2020) and Eugene Choi in the DC Extended Universe films Shazam! (2019) and Shazam! Fury of the Gods (2023).

== Personal life ==
Ian Chen was born to a Taiwanese American immigrant family in Los Angeles, California. He has a younger brother named Max and both are fluent in Mandarin. He has shown enthusiasm for video games. Chen also sings and plays guitar in a band, and is an aviation enthusiast. He graduated from Arcadia High School in 2024, and currently attends Harvard University.

== Filmography ==
=== Television ===
Year	Title	Role	Notes
2013	Modern Family	Lily's Friend at Cat Funeral	Episode: "Larry's Wife"
2014	Grey's Anatomy	Luca	Episode: "I Must Have Lost It on the Wind"
2015–20	Fresh Off the Boat	Evan Huang	Series regular; 116 episodes
2016	Dr. Ken	Henry	Episode: "The Wedding Sitter"
2016	Loosely Exactly Nicole	Troy	Episode: "Babysitting"
2018	Paradise Run	Himself	Episode: "Fresh Off the Run"
2018–22	Fancy Nancy	Jonathan	Voice, 13 episodes
2019–20	The Rocketeer	Logan	Voice, 5 episodes
2021	Yasuke	Ichiro	Voice, 3 episodes
2023	Summer Camp Island	Pale Dog	Voice, episodes: "Jar Guard" & "Retrace Our Hooves"
2025	Win or Lose	Junn	Voice, recurring role

=== Film ===
Year	Title	Role	Notes
2019	Shazam!	Eugene Choi	
2019	A Dog's Journey	Young Trent	
2021	Wish Dragon	Young Din	Voice
2023	Shazam! Fury of the Gods	Eugene Choi	
2023	Fish Boy	Patrick	short film

== Awards and nominations ==
Chen was ranked #1 in "The Best Asian Actors Under 25 In 2022" on Ranker by its visitors.

Chen was named one of Hollywood's Top 30 Stars Under Age 18 by The Hollywood Reporter in 2018 and 2019.

Chen was ranked #3 in Entertainment Weekly's "12 Under 12: The Best Child Actors of 2015", behind Jacob Tremblay and Marsai Martin.

Year	Award	Category	Work	Result
2015	Vulture	Best Child Actor	Fresh Off the Boat	Nominated
2016	Young Artist Awards	Outstanding Young Ensemble Cast In A TV Series	Fresh Off the Boat	Won
2016	Young Artist Awards	Best Performance in a TV Series – Supporting Young Actor	Fresh Off the Boat	Nominated
2016	Young Entertainer Awards	Best Young Ensemble Cast - TV Series	Fresh Off the Boat	Won
2017	Young Artist Awards	Best Performance in a TV Series - Leading Young Actor	Fresh Off the Boat	Nominated
2017	Young Artist Awards	Best Performance in a TV Series - Guest Starring Young Actor	Loosely Exactly Nicole	Won
2017	Young Entertainer Awards	Best Leading Young Actor 14 and Under - Television Series	Fresh Off the Boat	Nominated

== Appearances ==
In November 2016, Chen opened the "FASO Goes Pops!" orchestra concert with a performance of the young Michael Jackson hit, "Ben."

In June 2016, he starred as the main character in Eric Nam's music video "Into You".
