= Lucille Soong =

Chinese American actress

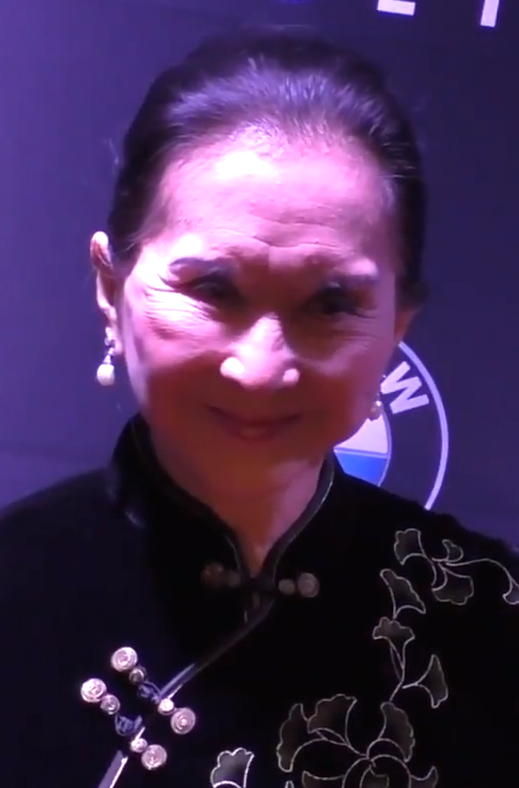
- Soong in 2016
- Born: September 5, 1935 (age 91) (Note: Although some websites give her birth date as August 15, 1938, the date has been published in newspapers as September 5, 1935 and her own autobiography confirms she was born in 1935.); Tianjin, Republic of China
- Other names: Song Jingxiu (birth name); Soong Ling (stage name)
- Citizenship: American
- Occupation: Actress
- Years active: 1959–present

Lucille Soong
- Traditional Chinese: 宋靜秀
- Simplified Chinese: 宋静秀
Transcriptions
Standard Mandarin
- Hanyu Pinyin: Sòng Jìngxiù

Lucille Soong (born September 5, 1935) is a Chinese-born American actress. In the 1960s she occasionally worked under the stage name Soong Ling. She is best known for her role as Jenny Huang in the television series Fresh Off the Boat (2015–2020). She has appeared in films and television shows since 1959, and is the author of the autobiography Wild Orchid: From Beijing to La-La Land.

== Early life ==
She was born to a wealthy family in Tianjin, China. She and her family suffered under political changes imposed following the Chinese Communist Revolution, and at age 21 she managed to move to Hong Kong during a brief relaxation of border controls due to the Hundred Flowers Campaign.

== Career ==
In Hong Kong she was discovered by Shaw Brothers Studio while out shopping. They recognized her capabilities and classic Chinese beauty, and signed her to an acting contract, but she convinced Run Run Shaw to tear up the agreement after she was introduced to the producers for British director Lewis Gilbert's 1959 film Ferry to Hong Kong starring Orson Welles. Though an uncredited role, it led to more work from international studios beginning with an American-Japanese movie, filmed in 1959 and released six years later as Three Weeks of Love, in which she played the girlfriend of leading man Tony Russel's character.

In 1962 she moved to England, by way of Jamaica where she had run a tourist gift shop for several months. In London she took modeling classes and began networking with film producers and directors, but within two months she was unexpectedly discovered again by an agent who pursued her down the street and asked her to appear in the movie 55 Days at Peking to be filmed in Madrid, Spain. White actors were cast in the main Chinese roles, while she had a non-speaking part as a lady-in-waiting to the Empress Dowager Cixi played by Dame Flora Robson.

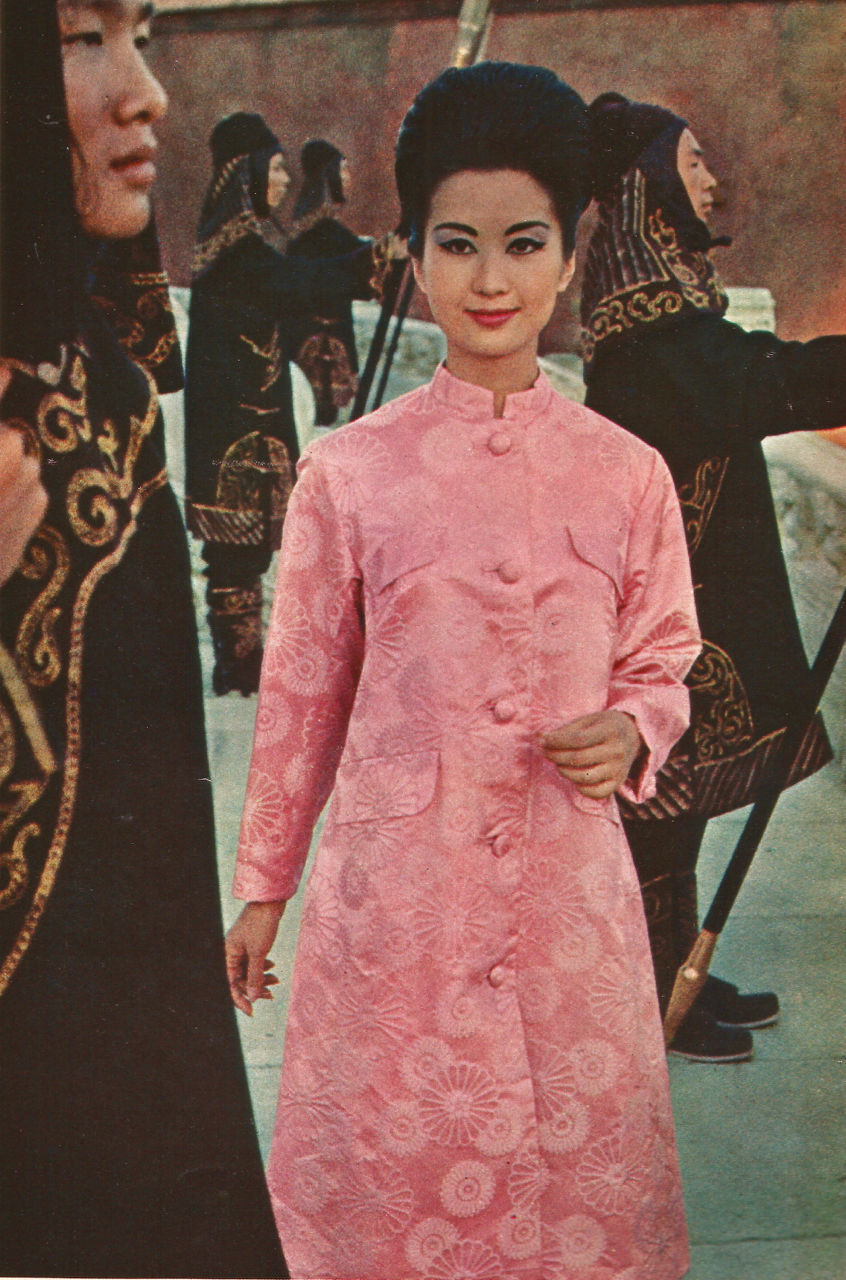
Lucille Song in Look magazine, January 29, 1963, modeling Dynasty of Hong Kong fashions on the Madrid set of 55 Days at Peking (credited as Soong Ling).

As part of the movie's publicity, she appeared in a photo spread in the American magazine Look, modeling clothing designed by Dynasty of Hong Kong on the film set. The publicity department also organized a "Miss Oriental Contest" competition for Chinese women in Spain. She won, and was crowned "Señorita Oriente". Returning to London, in 1963 she became the first Chinese model in the English Models Directory, and pursued careers in modelling and acting.

She was cast in small roles for British films like Darling and Dolly Story, as well as international productions of Marco the Magnificent (Marco Polo) and Genghis Khan with Anthony Quinn and Omar Sharif, and other movies, while her modeling contracts took her as far afield as Greece, Ceylon, and the Canary Islands. She then had a lead role in The Mini Affair (The Mini Mob) costarring with Georgie Fame, and a key role in One More Time with Sammy Davis Jr. and Peter Lawford.

She was in many British television series, including single-episode appearances in The Avengers, The Prisoner, Ghost Squad, Crane, Emergency-Ward 10, The Champions, the Edgar Wallace Mysteries, and others. In 1969 she had a recurring role in the soap opera Coronation Street playing Jasmine Chong, a rich young woman from Singapore who was dating Billy Walker. Over five episodes, her character suffered abuse from his mother Annie Walker and broke up with him.

While living in London from 1962 to 1973 she was in twenty-seven movies and TV shows. For some of those roles she was credited under the stage name "Soong Ling". But as time went on she was more often credited as "Lucille Soong", a name she first adopted in China, and it was under that name she appeared in newspaper publicity articles, gossip columns, and photographs while socializing with the rich and famous amidst London's Swinging Sixties.

She moved to the United States in 1973, where she "broke into the acting world in Hollywood and joined the Screen Actors Guild after 19 years of struggle". Unknown and initially unwelcome there, during that time she relied on funding from her London properties, opened a clothing store, worked as a realtor, became a sculptor — producing alabaster artwork exhibited and sold in New York and California — and maintained an active social and networking life. But in the last six of those years she finally obtained an agent, studied acting, and made a concerted effort to reenter the field.

Her American acting career began with a small role in an AT&T commercial in 1991. She then won the role of Popo in the 1993 film The Joy Luck Club. Feeling unprepared to portray a grandmother or any woman that much older than herself, she independently worked with three acting coaches. That led to a new career portraying more women of that type. However, aside from small roles in three 1999 films, including The Corruptor, for several years she had difficulty being cast in more movies or in any episodic television shows, because her refined looks, bearing, and clothing did not match casting directors' expectations for older Asian immigrant women. She then altered her hair, makeup, clothing, and acting to play to that typecasting, soon winning a role as a funny character in the independent film Nora's Hair Salon.

With that breakthrough, she found her niche in comedy and was booked on episodes of the popular sitcoms Dharma & Greg, According to Jim, and The King of Queens, and in the 2003 film Freaky Friday with Jamie Lee Curtis and Lindsay Lohan. Branching out, she was also in the 2006 action movie Mission Impossible III and in a recurring role on the Showtime drama series Huff, as well as other films and shows. Soon she was once again being recognized in public and approached for autographs and photos. The recognition and fan mail increased after she was cast as Yao Lin, the housekeeper of Eva Longoria's character in several episodes of Desperate Housewives.

She continued working regularly, reprising her character Ming in Nora's Hair Salon 2: A Cut Above in 2008, playing Nhung Chan in Nine Dead in 2009, and appearing in other films and shows including the 2013 SyFy channel movie Heebie Jeebies, but her breakthrough role was her casting as the sarcastic grandmother Jenny Huang in Fresh Off The Boat from 2015 to 2020, a show not at all bound by Asian typecasting of the sort that had limited her before.

She was in the 2024 Hallmark TV miniseries Holidazed, and that same year it was announced she and many others from the original cast would be reprising their Freaky Friday roles in Freakier Friday, which was released in August 2025.

Her autobiography, Wild Orchid: From Beijing to La-La Land, was published on May 1, 2024.

== Filmography ==
=== Film ===
Year	Title	Role	Notes
1959	Ferry to Hong Kong	The Bride	Uncredited
1963	55 Days at Peking	Concubine	Uncredited
1964	French Dressing	Starlet	Major
1965	Genghis Khan	Concubine	
1965	The Knack ...and How to Get It	Girl in Sauna	Uncredited
1965	Darling	Allie	Uncredited
1965	Marco the Magnificent	Princess Bride	Uncredited
1965	Three Weeks of Love	Girl in Hong Kong	
1966	The Brides of Fu Manchu	Ling / Bride	Uncredited
1968	The Mini-Affair	Lucille	Major
1969	The File of the Golden Goose	Girl in Bath	Uncredited
1970	One More Time	Kim Lee	Major
1993	The Joy Luck Club	Popo	
1999	The Corruptor	Elderly Immigrant	
1999	The Debtors	Chinese Restaurant Owner	
1999	My American Vacation	Friend of Grandma	
2003	Freaky Friday	Pei-Pei's Mom	Major
2004	Employee of the Month	Old Korean Lady	Uncredited
2004	Nora's Hair Salon	Ming	Major
2005	Sky High	Cook	
2005	Just like Heaven	Chinese Exorcist	
2006	Mission: Impossible III	Shanghai Woman	Uncredited
2007	Nancy Drew	Waitress	
2008	Nora's Hair Salon 2: A Cut Above	Ming	Major
2009	Nine Dead	Nhung Chan	Major
2021	Raya and the Last Dragon	Dang Hu (voice)	
2025	Freakier Friday	Pei-Pei's Mom	Major

=== Television ===
Year	Title	Role	Notes
1963	Ghost Squad	Hotel Barmaid	Episode: "Sabotage"
1963	Man of the World	Nurse	Episode: "The Enemy"
1964	Crane	Yasuma	Episode: "Man Without a Past"
1964	Sergeant Cork	Lotus Feng / Waitress	Episode: "The Case of the Dutiful Murderer"; Episode: "The Case of the Medicine Man"
1965	The Avengers	Miss Smith, Tusamo's Secretary	Episode: "The Cybernauts"
1966	Adam Adamant Lives!	Suzu	Episode: "More Deadly Than the Sword"
1967	Emergency – Ward 10	Blind Patient	Episode: "There's None So Blind"; Episode: "Second Sight"
1967–1970	The Troubleshooters	Su Lan / Hostess / Suzie	3 episodes
1967	The Prisoner	Flower Girl	Episode: "A. B. and C."
1968	Hugh and I Spy	Miss Lee	Episode: "Yellow Peril"
1969	Coronation Street	Jasmine Choong	5 episodes
1969	The Champions	Tsaiyoko Naga	Episode: "The Gun-Runners"
1971	Shirley's World	Tourist Guide	Episode: "A Mother's Touch"
1994	Vanishing Son	Ling	TV movie
1996	Yesterday's Target	Dr. Kang	TV movie
1997	Fired Up	Mrs. Kim	Episode: "The Rules"
1997–2001	Dharma & Greg	Mrs. Wong / Chinese Grandmother / Mrs. Kwan	3 episodes
1998	Maggie	Cat Lady	Episode: "Just Shoot Him"
1999	Ryan Caulfield: Year One	Store Owner	Episode: "Po-Piggity and Other Racial Slurs"
2000	Strong Medicine	Mrs. Lum	Episode: "Pilot"
2000	JAG	Older Vietnamese woman	Episode: "A Separate Peace: Part 1"
2000	The Michael Richards Show	Woman #1	Episode: "USA Toy"
2001	Chasing Destiny	Hostess	TV movie
2001	Passions	Sally Chin	4 episodes
2003	All About the Andersons	Mrs. Chong	Episode: "Everyone Plays"
2004–2009	Desperate Housewives	Yao Lin	Recurring; 7 episodes (Season 1, 5)
2004	Huff	Xui Shi	Episode: "That Fucking Cabin"; Episode: "Flashpants"
2005	According to Jim	Manicurist	Episode: "The Race"
2006	The King of Queens	Lily	Episode: "Apartment Complex"
2007	Bones	Mai Zhang	Episode: "The Boneless Bride in the River"
2008	The Sarah Silverman Program	Mrs. Xiongnu	Episode: "The Mongolian Beef"
2009	United States of Tara	Korean Grandmother	Episode: "Inspiration"
2009	Without a Trace	Mrs. Deng	Episode: "Devotion"
2010	Dark Blue	Mrs. Chin	Episode: "Urban Garden"
2010	The League	Security Line Woman	Episode: "Vegas Draft"
2010	How to Be a Better American	Estelle	TV movie
2013	Holding Patterns	Asian Woman	TV movie
2013	Heebie Jeebies	Zu Mu	TV movie
2015–2020	Fresh Off the Boat	Grandma Huang	Recurring (Season 1); Main Cast (Season 2–6)
2024	Holidazed	Grandma Lin	Mini Series
