= Jeff Yang =

American writer and businessman (born 1967 or 1968)

- 楊致和
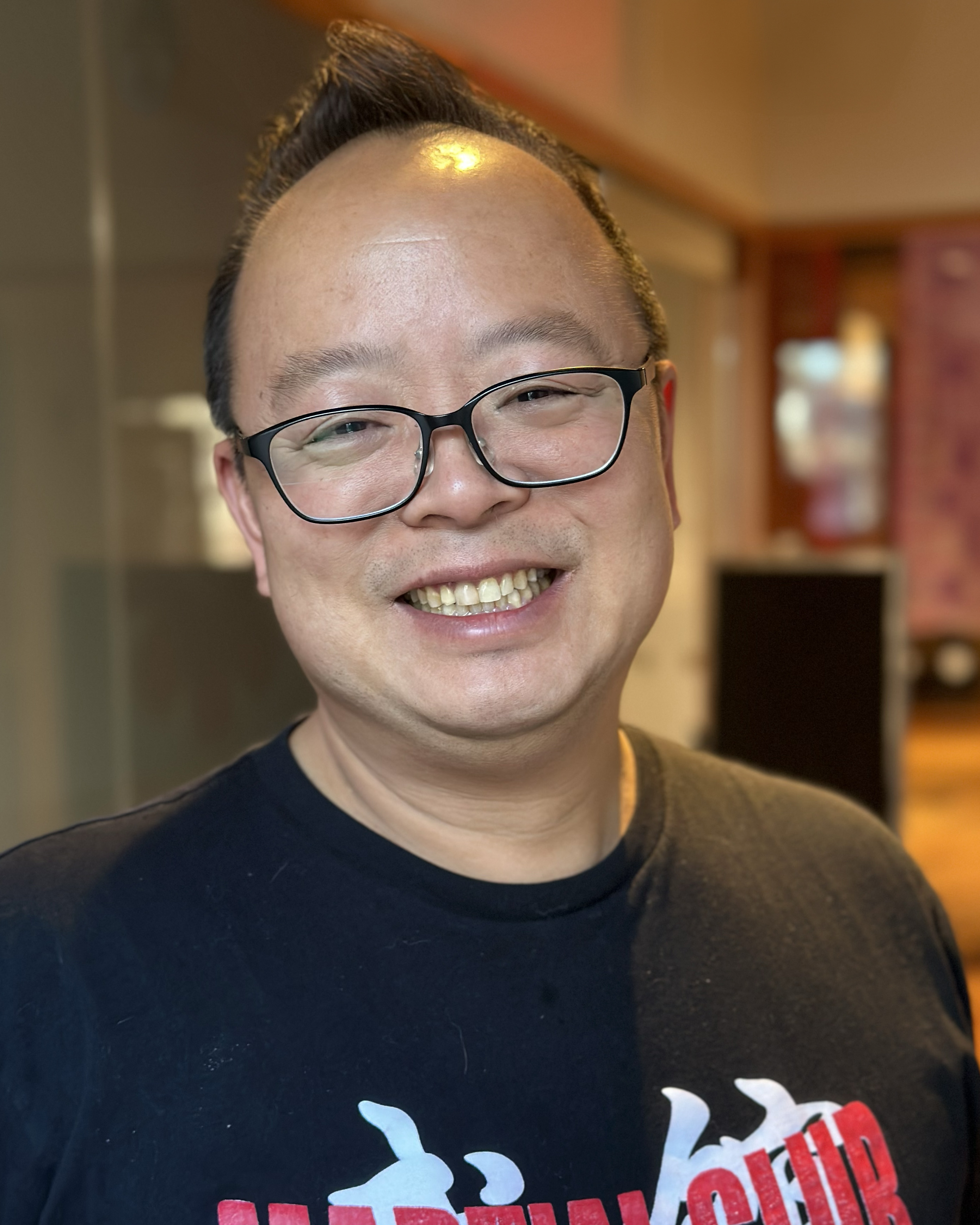
- Yang at Toronto Reel Asian International Film Festival in 2023
- Born: 1967 or 1968 (age 58–59); United States
- Education: Harvard University (BA)
- Occupation: Writer
- Spouse: Heather Ying (m. 2002; div. 2013)
- Children: 2, including Hudson Yang

Jeff Yang
- Traditional Chinese: 楊致和
- Simplified Chinese: 杨致和
Transcriptions
Standard Mandarin
- Hanyu Pinyin: Yáng Zhìhé

Jeff Yang (Chinese: 楊致和; born 1967 or 1968) is an American writer, journalist, businessman, and business/media consultant who writes the Tao Jones column for The Wall Street Journal. Previously, he was the "Asian Pop" columnist at the San Francisco Chronicle. He is an expert on Asian American pop culture and is the co-author of RISE: A Pop History of Asian America from the Nineties to Now (2022) with Philip Wang and Phil Yu and The Golden Screen: The Movies That Made Asian America (2023).

== Early life and education ==
Yang was born to a Taiwanese American family. He graduated from Harvard University in 1989 with a Bachelor of Arts in psychology.

== Career ==
Yang has written a number of books related to Asian popular culture, including Once Upon a Time in China: A Guide to the Cinemas of Hong Kong, Taiwan and Mainland China, I Am Jackie Chan: My Life in Action (with Jackie Chan), and Eastern Standard Time: A Guide to Asian Influence in American Culture, from Astro Boy to Zen Buddhism.

In the comics genre, he has written Secret Identities: The Asian American Superhero Anthology and co-wrote the second graphic novel in the Secret Identities series, Shattered: The Asian American Comics Anthology. He has also written for the Village Voice, VIBE, Spin, and Condé Nast Portfolio.

Yang is also a business/media consultant on marketing to Asian American consumers for Iconoculture, Inc. Before joining Iconoculture, Yang was CEO of Factor, Inc., another marketing consultancy targeting Asian Americans.

Starting in 1989, Yang was the creator and publisher of A Magazine, then the largest circulating English-language Asian American magazine in the United States before it closed its doors in 2002. The magazine grew out of an undergraduate publication that he had edited while a student at Harvard University. Yang was a producer for the first nationally distributed Asian American television show, Stir.

He is a member of the Asian American Journalists Association and has served on the advisory boards of the Asian American Justice Center, Asian Americans Advancing Justice, and the China Institute in America.

== Personal life ==
Yang was married to Heather Ying, a physician assistant in cardiothoracic surgery. They married in 2002 and divorced in 2013. They have two sons, Hudson and Skyler. Their elder son, Hudson Yang, is a star of the 2015 ABC television series Fresh Off the Boat, based on Eddie Huang's memoir, Fresh Off the Boat: A Memoir.

== Works ==
- Yang, Jeff; Gan, Dina; Hong, Terry (1997). Eastern Standard Time: A Guide to Asian Influence on American Culture from Astro Boy to Zen Buddhism. Boston: Mariner Books; Houghton Mifflin. ISBN 0-395-76341-X. OCLC 37022942.

== See also ==
- Chinese people in New York City
- New Yorkers in journalism
- Taiwanese people in New York City
