= FOTB =

FOTB may refer to:

- Fresh off the boat, a phrase used to describe immigrants that have not assimilated into the host nation
- Fresh Off the Boat: A Memoir, an autobiography by American food personality Eddie Huang
  - Fresh Off the Boat, an American sitcom series loosely inspired by Eddie Huang's life and book
- Father of the Bride (album), the fourth studio album by Vampire Weekend
