= Jesse Pearson =

Jesse Pearson may refer to:

- Jesse Pearson (actor) (1930-1979)
- Jesse Pearson (writer) who was the editor-in-chief of Vice Magazine (2002 until 2010)

== See also ==
- Pearson (surname)
