= Vice Is Broke =

2024 documentary film

Vice Is Broke is a 2024 documentary film which follows the history of Vice Media. It was directed by Eddie Huang.

The documentary was released worldwide through the streaming platform Mubi on August 29, 2025. It features interview from former and current Vice employees, including Lesley Arfin, David Choe, Amy Kellner, David Macklovitch, Gavin McInnes, Josh Ostrovsky, Simon Ostrovsky, Jesse Peason, Justin Pichetrungsi, Santiago Stelley, and Josh Tyrangiel.
