= Stir (TV series) =

Stir, also referred to as StirTV, Stir TV and Stir-TV, was the first nationally distributed Asian American television show. Produced by former A. Magazine publisher Jeff Yang in collaboration with KTSF producers Ashley Hathaway and David Baker, the 30-minute show aired on the International Channel for two seasons from December 2004 – 2005. The magazine-style program, which targeted viewers aged 18–25, was hosted by Tony Wang, a Chinese American corporate lawyer; Sabrina Shimada, a Japanese-German American high school student; Brian Tong, a Chinese-American Apple computer salesman; and Jeannie Mai, a Vietnamese-Chinese American make-up artist. In addition to the hosts, the show featured two correspondents, Franco Finn, hype man for the Golden State Warriors, and Ling Woo Liu, a journalist.

The show was nominated for an Emmy in 2005 for Episode #1 in the Children/Youth Program category.
