= I Am Jackie Chan =

Book by Jackie Chan

I Am Jackie Chan: My Life in Action
- Book cover
- Author: Jackie Chan, Jeff Yang
- Language: English
- Genre: Autobiography
- Publisher: Random House Inc.
- Publication date: August 1998 (original), 1999 (special edition)
- Publication place: United States
- Media type: Papercover/Hardcover
- Pages: 398
- ISBN: 0-345-42913-3

I Am Jackie Chan: My Life in Action is a 1998 autobiography written by Jackie Chan with help from Jeff Yang, written before Chan's success Rush Hour–a special edition of the book was released in 1999 telling events occurring after Chan's success with the movie. The book tells of Chan's life story from when he was born to several months after Rush Hour was made. The last few pages of the book contain a Top 10 list of Chan's favorite stunts and fights and an almost complete filmography of him. The book was dedicated to his parents.

On January 7, 2010, on The Tonight Show with Conan O'Brien, Chan stated that he has had plans since around 2008 to produce a musical film of his life based on the book, which would be entitled I Am Jackie Chan: The Musical. The film was inspired due to Chan's early love for musicals, with such films as The Sound of Music. The movie ended up never coming to fruition.
