= The Ray (film) =

- Directed by: Christopher Borrelli
- Written by: Christopher Borrelli
- Produced by: Lisa Mathis; Matt R. Allen; Krista Suh; Gabriel Roth
- Starring: Mark Dacascos; Janel Parrish; Alison Thornton; Ari Barkan; Celestino Cornielle; Ben Milliken; Richard Kind; Brad William Henke; Hudson Yang
- Cinematography: Adam Lee
- Edited by: Chester Howie; Niven Howie
- Music by: Zach Robinson
- Production companies: Branch Out Productions; Glass Horse Films; Paper Anvil
- Distributed by: Paramount Pictures
- Release dates: December 3, 2021 (United States); March 1, 2022 (DVD)
- Country: United States
- Language: English

The Ray (also known as Run & Gun) is a 2021 American action thriller film written and directed by Christopher Borrelli. The film stars Mark Dacascos, Janel Parrish, Celestino Cornielle, Ben Milliken, Richard Kind, Brad William Henke, Hudson Yang, and Ari Barkan.

Set in the ruins of the Salton Sea and follows Ray, a former criminal evading a series of ruthless killers led by eccentric mob boss, Grayson. Ray finds refuge with a mysterious good Samaritan, but it soon becomes apparent that he has walked into the nest of someone even more dangerous than the killers pursuing him.

== Plot ==
Two men are driven by a mobster to be killed in the desert. When one of them (Ray) is hanged, he escapes and kills the assassin. The second man (Lupe) recognizes the first as working for a gangstress called Shoemaker, and strikes a friendship with him. Two years later, Ray is a successful insurance investigator, with a girlfriend (Faith) and her son (Julian). He lives in an RV, and Faith invites him to move in with her.

Lupe, now a convict, calls Ray and says some gangsters saw him visiting Lupe in prison. Soon thereafter, Perry delivers a message to Ray, ordering him to see Grayson, a mobster boss. When Ray meets Grayson, he receives two tasks: kill a neighbor's tree with poison, and intercept a package being delivered to Shoemaker. Otherwise, Grayson threatens to kill Faith and Julian.

Brando, Grayson's assistant, gives a bag with $440,000 to Ray to offer Ninni in exchange for the package. After the exchange, Ray gets a flat tire on his RV and while getting down to fix it, is shot in the stomach by Ninni and his brother, who chase Ray around the desert. Ray is able to kill Ninni's brother and steal their car along with the loot, but the car breaks down. Hence he stores the two bags - the cash and the package - into the hood of an old abandoned car, taking some cash with him. Ninni calls Brando and informs him that both the money and package were stolen by Ray, whereupon Brando asks Ninni to get rid of Ray.

Ray is wounded and walking in the desert, when he sees a Corvette parked outside a factory. A security guard, Billings, comes out and invites Ray into the factory and takes out the bullet lodged in his stomach. Ray offers $20,000 for Billings' aid, but he refuses. Billings then locks up Ray and wants more than the $20,000 offered to him. Ray poisons Billings' alcohol flask and attempts to run away, when suddenly Ninni appears and points a gun at Ray and asks for the money. Billings sneaks behind Ninni and kills him with an ax.

Grayson talks about the Mandela effect to his henchmen Brando and Perry, whereby a large number of people come to believe in something that is not true. He thinks that the package will influence the whole world concerning the Mandela effect.

Faith calls Ray's phone, but Billings answers it and pretends to be a doctor, telling Faith that Ray is injured and she needs to come in to see him. Billings then goes about hunting Ray to collect both the bags, but he takes a sip from his alcohol flask and gets mildly poisoned. Ray hides from Billings, but a woman (Tara) who is chained knocks him down. Tara says she has been held in captivity for five days, ever since Billings grabbed her from the road. A vehicle approaches the factory, and Ray leaves Tara to find a means to escape. The driver of the truck that just arrived is a woman friend of Billings, who takes Tara for human trafficking, but Tara manages to escape. The woman friend of Billings accidentally steps on a bear trap and is shot dead by Billings.

After stealing the key to the Corvette, Ray drives out together with Tara, but Billings shuts down the car using a remote control. When Tara tries to run away, Billings shoots her down. Ray hides in a small cabin, but Billings blocks the door to the cabin with large rocks so it can't be opened. As Billings threatens to kill Faith and her son, Ray reveals the location of both the bags. Ray digs his way out of cabin with a shovel, just as Billings razes the cabin to the ground. The two wrestle, and when Billings is about to kill Ray with a rock, Grayson arrives on the scene with Brando and Perry, and tie up both Ray and Billings.

Billings tries to convince Grayson that both the bags are under the hood of the abandoned car, but Grayson finds only the package - which contains some VHS video tapes with Sinbad/Shazaam and Shaq/Kazaam movies, which serve as confirmation that the Mandela effect is real. They question Ray about the missing bag with cash, and not receiving a satisfactory reply, chain him to a car and drag him through the desert sand to force him to reveal its location. Tara arrives abruptly in the Corvette and has the bag of cash in the seat next to her. Ray frees himself of handcuffs and chains Grayson to the car, and Perry drags Grayson through the sand instead. Brando tries to shoot Ray, but Billings knocks Brando out and frees himself and gets himself a pair of guns.

Ray goes to a truck and grabs a gun which only has a single bullet, and shoots to only manage grazing Billings' ear. Ray then finds a stick of dynamite and lights it up and throws it at Billings, who falls to the ground stunned. Ray drives away from the factory on a truck, running over Billings on the way out. He calls Faith and asks her to turn back, promising to tell her everything later. He picks up Tara on the way and says he just needs to get home.

In a mid-credits scene, Ray is home with Lupe, who shows him the Kazaam videos containing Cayman bank accounts, presumably belonging to Ray's former employer, Shoemaker.

== Cast ==
- Mark Dacascos as Brando
- Janel Parrish as Faith
- Celestino Cornielle as Ninni / Gerardo
- Ben Milliken as Ray
- Ari Barkan as Perry
- Richard Kind as Grayson
- Brad William Henke as Billings
- Hudson Yang as Cal

== Production ==
The film was filmed in Albuquerque, New Mexico, set in the ruins of the Salton Sea.
