= List of Fresh Off the Boat episodes =

Fresh Off the Boat is an American television sitcom broadcast on ABC created by Nahnatchka Khan. The story follows the course of Eddie Huang's Taiwanese family as they make their way from Washington, D.C. to Orlando, Florida to open up a steak restaurant. The series premiered on February 4, 2015. On May 7, 2015, the show was renewed by ABC for a second season. On March 3, 2016, ABC renewed the series for a third season, which premiered on October 11, 2016. On May 12, 2017, ABC renewed the series for a fourth season, which premiered on October 3, 2017. A fifth season premiered on October 5, 2018. A milestone was achieved leading up to the season finale when it became the first Asian American series on network television to reach 100 episodes when it aired April 5, 2019. On May 10, 2019, ABC renewed the series for a sixth season. The series concluded on February 21, 2020, after six seasons.

During the course of the series, 116 episodes of Fresh Off the Boat aired over six seasons, between February 4, 2015, and February 21, 2020.

== Series overview ==
Season	Episodes	Originally released	
Season	Episodes	First released	Last released
1	13	February 4, 2015	April 21, 2015
2	24	September 22, 2015	May 24, 2016
3	23	October 11, 2016	May 16, 2017
4	19	October 3, 2017	March 20, 2018
5	22	October 5, 2018	April 12, 2019
6	15	September 27, 2019	February 21, 2020

== Episodes ==
=== Season 1 (2015) ===
No. overall	No. in season	Title	Directed by	Written by	Original release date	Prod. code	US viewers (millions)
1	1	"Pilot"	Lynn Shelton	Nahnatchka Khan	February 4, 2015	1AXT01	7.94
2	2	"Home Sweet Home-School"	Max Winkler	Kourtney Kang	February 4, 2015	1AXT03	7.47
3	3	"The Shunning"	Jake Kasdan	Nahnatchka Khan	February 10, 2015	1AXT02	6.05
4	4	"Success Perm"	Gail Mancuso	Rich Blomquist	February 10, 2015	1AXT04	5.86
5	5	"Persistent Romeo"	Lynn Shelton	Sanjay Shah	February 17, 2015	1AXT05	6.17
6	6	"Fajita Man"	Matt Sohn	Matt Kuhn	February 24, 2015	1AXT06	5.79
7	7	"Showdown at the Golden Saddle"	Lynn Shelton	Keith Heisler	March 3, 2015	1AXT07	6.02
8	8	"Phillip Goldstein"	Phil Traill	Jeff Chiang & Eric Ziobrowski	March 10, 2015	1AXT08	5.08
9	9	"License to Sell"	Alisa Statman	Camilla Blackett	March 24, 2015	1AXT09	4.92
10	10	"Blind Spot"	Claire Scanlon	David Smithyman	March 31, 2015	1AXT10	4.83
11	11	"Very Superstitious"	Alex Hardcastle	Ali Wong	April 7, 2015	1AXT11	4.85
12	12	"Dribbling Tiger, Bounce Pass Dragon"	Robert Cohen	Rich Blomquist	April 14, 2015	1AXT12	4.76
13	13	"So Chineez"	Chris Koch	Sanjay Shah	April 21, 2015	1AXT13	5.08

=== Season 2 (2015–16) ===
No. overall	No. in season	Title	Directed by	Written by	Original release date	Prod. code	US viewers (millions)
14	1	"Family Business Trip"	Lynn Shelton	Nahnatchka Khan	September 22, 2015	2AXT01	6.05
15	2	"Boy II Man"	Claire Scanlon	Matt Kuhn	September 29, 2015	2AXT02	4.74
16	3	"Shaquille O'Neal Motors"	Lynn Shelton	Keith Heisler	October 6, 2015	2AXT03	4.85
17	4	"The Fall Ball"	Tristram Shapeero	Jeff Chiang	October 13, 2015	2AXT04	3.96
18	5	"Miracle on Dead Street"	Bill Purple	Eric Ziobrowski	October 27, 2015	2AXT05	4.07
19	6	"Good Morning Orlando"	Phil Traill	Camilla Blackett	November 3, 2015	2AXT06	4.45
20	7	"The Big 1–2"	Lynn Shelton	Rachna Fruchbom	November 10, 2015	2AXT07	3.77
21	8	"Huangsgiving"	Gail Mancuso	David Smithyman	November 17, 2015	2AXT08	3.90
22	9	"We Done Son"	Bill Purple	Ali Wong	December 1, 2015	2AXT09	3.66
23	10	"The Real Santa"	Henry Chan	Kourtney Kang	December 8, 2015	2AXT10	3.94
24	11	"Year of the Rat"	Ken Whittingham	Sheng Wang	February 2, 2016	2AXT13	5.19
25	12	"Love and Loopholes"	Phil Traill	Jeff Chiang	February 9, 2016	2AXT16	4.23
26	13	"Phil's Phaves"	Alisa Statman	Rich Blomquist	February 16, 2016	2AXT11	4.64
27	14	"Michael Chang Fever"	Bill Purple	Sanjay Shah	February 23, 2016	2AXT12	4.59
28	15	"Keep 'Em Separated"	Jude Weng	Matt Kuhn	March 8, 2016	2AXT15	4.94
29	16	"Tight Two"	Lynn Shelton	Keith Heisler	March 15, 2016	2AXT14	4.10
30	17	"Doing it Right"	Christine Gernon	Eric Ziobrowski	March 22, 2016	2AXT17	4.63
31	18	"Week in Review"	Claire Scanlon	Kourtney Kang	March 29, 2016	2AXT18	4.63
32	19	"Jessica Place"	Sean Kavanagh	Abbey Caldwell	April 5, 2016	2AXT19	4.23
33	20	"Hi, My Name Is..."	Bill Purple	Rachna Fruchbom	April 26, 2016	2AXT21	4.70
34	21	"Rent Day"	Jude Weng	Camilla Blackett	May 3, 2016	2AXT20	4.29
35	22	"Gotta Be Me"	Ken Whittingham	David Smithyman	May 10, 2016	2AXT22	3.91
36	23	"The Manchurian Dinner Date"	Nahnatchka Khan	Rich Blomquist	May 17, 2016	2AXT23	4.23
37	24	"Bring the Pain"	Bill Purple	Sanjay Shah	May 24, 2016	2AXT24	4.88

=== Season 3 (2016–17) ===
No. overall	No. in season	Title	Directed by	Written by	Original release date	Prod. code	US viewers (millions)
38	1	"Coming from America"	Nahnatchka Khan	Nahnatchka Khan	October 11, 2016	3AXT01	5.03
The Huang family visits Taiwan to attend the wedding of Louis' brother, Gene. Louis is stunned at both Gene's success and how beautiful his fiancée is, cursing himself for starting over in America. While Jessica finds that much has changed from her idealized memories of her home country, she also admits she loves her life in America and convinces Louis that he made the right move. Meanwhile, Eddie promised to contact Alison via fax while he was away, but finds access to a fax machine difficult. Guest Starring: Ann Hsu as Margaret
39	2	"Breaking Chains"	Jude Weng	Kourtney Kang	October 18, 2016	3AXT02	4.10
Upon seeing Jessica stressing over keeping the house clean, Louis gets her a maid as a gift, but she takes it as a slap in the face. On Emery's first day of middle school, he finds things difficult due to lies Eddie had previously told about his culture to get out of things like eating vegetables, showering, and sitting in the front of the classroom. Meanwhile, Evan laments the fact that he no longer has his older brother to accompany him to elementary school. He eventually decides to make a memorial in his old seat on the school bus, frightening a girl in the process.
40	3	"Louisween"	Lynn Shelton	Matt Kuhn	October 25, 2016	3AXT03	3.98
Jessica refuses to participate in Halloween, although it is Louis' favorite holiday. Evan is tired of being Emery's costume sidekick every Halloween. Emery lets Evan pick the costumes this year, but is not pleased with the results. Eddie and his pals get invited to a Halloween party that Nicole is throwing while her parents are out. The older high-school kids and Eddie's pals think it is lame and leave, but Eddie stays and finds a way to save Nicole's reputation.
41	4	"Citizen Jessica"	Claire Scanlon	Sanjay Shah	November 1, 2016	3AXT04	3.51
Cattleman's becomes an official polling place for the 1996 elections. Emery openly supports Bob Dole for president, despite Evan insisting that Dole has no chance of winning. Jessica learns that her commission from selling a huge house will put her and Louis into a higher tax bracket, so she backs a strong anti-tax proposal that is on the ballot. It is further revealed that Jessica simply renews her resident alien (green card) status over and over, never trying to become a U.S. citizen. Elsewhere, Eddie laments the death of Tupac Shakur and opposes the accusations that Biggie was involved.
42	5	"No Thanks-giving"	Alisa Statman	Keith Heisler	November 15, 2016	3AXT05	4.28
Jessica tells the family she does not want to celebrate Thanksgiving because it has nothing to do with their culture, but her real motive is to get Louis to open up Cattleman's on the holiday. Meanwhile, Eddie has figured out that colleges never look at middle-school grades, so he thinks he can coast for the rest of the semester, but Jessica will have none of it.
43	6	"WWJD: What Would Jessica Do?"	Matt Sohn	Laura McCreary	November 29, 2016	3AXT06	4.20
Jessica is disappointed when Evan decides to abandon their Sunday tradition of shopping at Costco together so he can attend church with his friend Zach. Meanwhile, Marvin over-whitens Louis' teeth during a dental visit, which results in Louis creeping out his family and being the butt of Grandma's jokes.
44	7	"The Taming of the Dads"	Sean Kavanaugh	Rich Blomquist	December 6, 2016	3AXT07	3.88
Alison convinces Eddie to take her to the new movie version of Romeo and Juliet, which ends up being an awkward "double date" with their fathers who are both Shakespeare buffs. Upon seeing their dads having way more fun together than they are, Alison thinks her relationship with Eddie has become stale and suggests they take a break. Meanwhile, Jessica has to serve on jury duty and becomes angered when the jurors pick someone else to be the foreperson. Also, a relative from Taiwan sends Evan and Emery a Tamagotchi, which takes up way more of their time than they anticipate.
45	8	"Where are the Giggles?"	Chris Koch	Jeff Chiang	December 13, 2016	3AXT08	3.86
The Huangs go to see the Christmas movie Jingle All the Way, but accidentally leave Evan at home. Realizing her mistake, Jessica calls and asks Marvin to check on Evan, but Evan has set a trap (à la Kevin in Home Alone) which causes Marvin to slip and hurt his back. Marvin sues the Huangs, trying to convince Louis that it is no big deal because the money will come from their insurance. Louis sees things differently, saying friends do not sue friends, even for insurance money.
46	9	"How to Be An American"	Chris Koch	Camilla Blackett	January 3, 2017	3AXT10	4.37
Jessica is applying for U.S. citizenship opposite an immigration agent (Zachary Knighton) who forces her to explain some questionable items on her record. As her explanations are played out in flashback, Louis is stunned to find that Jessica finally accepted his marriage proposal (following five unsuccessful attempts) only after her last-ditch effort to get a work visa extension failed. Elsewhere, Eddie convinces his brothers to take a joyride with him in the family minivan.
47	10	"The Best of Orlando"	Phil Traill	Eric Ziobrowski	January 17, 2017	3AXT09	3.91
Jessica invites everyone she knows to attend a ceremony naming Louis as Orlando's "Small Businessman of the Year", but Louis ruins the moment by forgetting to mention Jessica during his acceptance speech. Meanwhile, Eddie and Emery enlist Grandma's help to start a clothing line.
48	11	"Clean Slate"	Bill Purple	David Smithyman	January 18, 2017	3AXT12	5.50
Jessica pushes the family to settle all debts, disputes and grudges on the eve of Chinese New Year in order to ensure good fortune for the coming year, while she enlists Emery to help keep her own temper in check. Evan gets a lousy haircut from Louis' favorite barber and sends a hateful letter, which Louis then tries to intercept. Meanwhile, Eddie entertains his lame cousin.
49	12	"Sisters Without Subtext"	Jude Weng	Rachna Fruchbom	February 7, 2017	3AXT11	3.82
Jessica warms up to her sister Connie when she hears that she is looking at colleges, but that changes when she learns Connie wants to enroll in art school. Meanwhile, Marvin takes Honey and the Huang boys on a mystery trip which turns out to be the tour of a retirement home. Marvin says he plans to move in to the home in "two or three years", which does not sit well with Honey.
50	13	"Neighbors with Attitude"	Bill Purple	Abbey Caldwell	February 14, 2017	3AXT14	3.66
Jessica suggests to the home owners' association that they should start a neighborhood watch. The group likes the idea, but Deirdre will not let Jessica be involved because she is not a "team player", prompting Louis to jump in. Eddie plots to finally get his first kiss from Allison at an upcoming Valentine's Day dance, using Trent as his wingman. Meanwhile, Grandma reveals that she has money hidden in the house. When Emery insists the money should be in a bank, Grandma challenges him to find it.
51	14	"The Gloves Are Off"	Fred Savage	Sheng Wang	February 21, 2017	3AXT13	3.85
Honey complains that Sarah, Marvin's ex-wife and Nicole's mother (Heather Locklear), lets Nicole do whatever she wants, forcing Honey to always be the tough parent. Jessica tries to do something about it, even though that was not what Honey wanted her to do. Meanwhile, the kids see a commercial stating that a motorized chair can be free to someone over 65, but they do not know Grandma's age and she does not know herself.
52	15	"Living While Eddie"	Jeffrey Walker	Rich Blomquist	February 28, 2017	3AXT15	4.13
Louis is excited to be hosting an infomercial shoot at Cattleman's and Emery asks if he can tag along and meet his hero, pitchman Tony Wonder (Rhys Darby). When Louis is asked to stand in for a no-show actor, Emery gives his Dad a crooked pep talk, intending to make him nervous because Emery really wants to be in the commercial. At home, Jessica blames Eddie for stealing her papaya out of the fruit bowl. Eddie complains that he is blamed for everything and accuses his mom of profiling. Later, Jessica has to go to the mall record store, where Eddie has been accused of stealing a CD. Eddie proves the CD is his own, having brought it in to sell via the store's buyback program. Jessica apologizes and Eddie then tells her that Evan ate the papaya, but he took the blame because his little brother still had a "clean record."
53	16	"Gabby Goose"	Alisa Statman	Jeff Chiang	March 7, 2017	3AXT16	3.69
After Jessica acts like a sore loser during game night, Louis goes to Honey for advice on what he can do about it and Jessica is furious when she finds out Louis aired their dirty laundry to a neighbor. Meanwhile, Eddie learns that Notorious B.I.G. has been shot to death and takes it very hard. Emery, Evan, Allison, and his friends all try, unsuccessfully, to console him.
54	17	"The Flush"	Kevin Bray	Keith Heisler	March 14, 2017	3AXT17	3.37
To save $20 on a recliner for Grandma, Jessica chooses to go to the furniture store's warehouse in Georgia rather than pay their $75 handling fee. Honey tags along, while Evan and Emery try to educate her on how to handle a road trip with their mom. At home, Louis plans a "guys weekend" with Eddie, lounging around and watching movies, but Eddie's friends crash the party. When Trent brings a beer to share with the group, Eddie painfully learns about something he inherited from his father.
55	18	"Time to Get Ill"	Chris Addison	Eric Ziobrowski	April 4, 2017	3AXT18	3.82
With Jessica ill and unable to watch their every move, Louis and the boys scheme to order a pay-per-view wrestling event, something Jessica would never allow. Unbeknownst to the men, Jessica is also plotting a scheme.
56	19	"Driving Miss Jenny"	Geeta Patel	Laura McCreary	April 11, 2017	3AXT19	3.71
Louis worries when Grandma starts using her new motorized wheelchair to take trips all over town. With Jessica in a spring-cleaning frenzy, Emery tries to keep her from throwing out all of his childhood memories. Meanwhile, Eddie learns how much money Evan is making by taking care of plants and pets for vacationing neighbors and decides he wants in on it.
57	20	"The Masters"	Phil Traill	Rachna Fruchbom	April 18, 2017	3AXT21	3.72
Jessica is overly enthusiastic when she learns that Tiger Woods is half Asian. When Louis suggests that Jessica pushes the kids too much, they pit Evan and Eddie against each other in a golf match to put their two parenting styles to the test. Meanwhile, Emery wants the entire school to know about Tiger's Asian heritage, so he tries to convince Reba to let him do the PA announcements for a day.
58	21	"Pie vs. Cake"	Nisha Ganatra	Daniel Carter & Jeff Chlebus	May 2, 2017	3AXT20	3.33
Jessica is thrilled to hear that Evan wants to join the debate team at school, but her joy is tempered when it appears that Evan's skills in argument and persuasion may exceed her own. Elsewhere, Emery and Eddie collaborate on creating a comic book for a contest, but it soon becomes clear that they have vastly different ideas about characters and storylines.
59	22	"This Is Us"	Claire Scanlon	Sanjay Shah	May 9, 2017	3AXT22	3.43
Jessica and Louis both go "off plan", as Jessica tries to get Evan into an exclusive private school while Louis entertains the idea of letting Michael Bolton become a silent partner in the restaurant. Meanwhile, Eddie and his pals are graduating middle school and devise a plan to ensure they will not be tagged as "losers" when they begin high school. When she realizes Evan cannot get into the private school because the Huangs are renters, Jessica offers to buy a large home from a real estate client (Ian Gomez). Eddie arrives at home to find his family packing boxes and is hit with the realization that he has to leave his friends behind.
60	23	"This Isn't Us"	Bill Purple	Matt Kuhn	May 16, 2017	3AXT23	3.55
The Huangs move into their new house, but are not able to enjoy it when Jessica says they are "house poor" and quickly lays down rules and restrictions. Michael Bolton starts turning Cattleman's into a merchandising opportunity, but Louis does not complain after he is handed a big check for his cut. Eddie tries to find a way to stay close to the friends he has left behind. Emery discovers that Evan's blazer for St. Orlando's Academy is made in China, possibly by child laborers, and he gets Evan kicked out of the school when they complain to the superintendent (Howard Hessman). At the end of the episode, Jessica convinces Louis that they should move back to their old home, but they find that it has already been rented to someone else.

=== Season 4 (2017–18) ===
No. overall	No. in season	Title	Directed by	Written by	Original release date	Prod. code	US viewers (millions)
61	1	"B as in Best Friends"	Bill Purple	David Smithyman	October 3, 2017	4AXT01	4.51
The Huangs move in with Honey and Marvin and quickly make themselves comfortable. Eddie tries to reconcile with his old friends, but instead reconnects with Nicole, who drops a bombshell on him. Jessica is invited to Wheel of Fortune for a Best Friends episode and takes Honey as her best friend, but Honey argues with her on camera about the Huangs taking advantage of her hospitality. Elsewhere, Emery and Louis build a birdhouse based on Emery's design, but find it too creepy after it is fully built. Louis is surprised when Michael Bolton decides to bail on their restaurant partnership, allowing Kenny Rogers to buy out Bolton's share.
62	2	"First Day"	Alisa Statman	Laura McCreary	October 10, 2017	4AXT02	4.08
Emery is looking forward to a year of middle school without Eddie or Evan, but is shocked to find Evan on the bus with him because he skipped a grade. Bad things happen to Emery on his first day of school, which Grandma attributes to it being the Year of the Ox on the Chinese calendar. Eddie sees Alison talking to some football players and thinks he has to join the football team to keep her. After being cut in tryouts, Eddie tries to trick Alison into thinking he is still on the team, leading to their breakup after she finds out. Eddie's friends welcome him back into the fold after seeing how pathetic he is. Meanwhile, Kenny Rogers' transition manager Matthew (Matt Oberg) requests that major changes be made to Cattleman's, upsetting Louis.
63	3	"Kids"	Erin O'Malley	Jeff Chiang	October 17, 2017	4AXT03	3.93
When Eddie acts surprisingly mature about his breakup with Alison, Louis and Jessica feel like they've gotten out of "kid jail" with their final son growing up. They look forward to fun nights out with Marvin and Honey, only to learn that Marvin is planning to get his vasectomy reversed and have a child with Honey. Eddie learns that Alison had struck up a friendship with Evan during their time together and the two struggle to break the news to Evan that Alison cannot hang out at the house anymore. Meanwhile, Grandma tries to use Emery's bad luck year to her own advantage.
64	4	"It's a Plastic Pumpkin, Louis Huang"	Alisa Statman	Sanjay Shah	October 24, 2017	4AXT04	4.16
Louis is disappointed when Evan no longer wants to dress up and help him hand out Halloween candy like they used to do, preferring to attend an adult party at Deirdre's instead. Jessica and Emery hear a spooky voice coming from Grandma's room and follow up when strangers come to the Huangs' door and whisk Grandma away. Meanwhile, Eddie and his pals hang around outside a Halloween party hosted by older girls from the high school, hoping to be invited.
65	5	"Four Funerals and a Wedding"	Lynn Shelton	Rachna Fruchbom	October 31, 2017	4AXT05	3.53
At a funeral for Jessica's great aunt, Louis and the kids meet Jessica's father, whom she rarely mentions and almost never sees. When another funeral and a family wedding follow, Louis tries to force Jessica to converse with her father, projecting his feelings of regret that he did not spend more time with his own father onto her. At home, Evan makes changes to his will and testament, causing the neighborhood women to think he is dying. Meanwhile, Honey takes the death of Princess Diana extremely hard.
66	6	"A League of Her Own"	Jay Chandrasekhar	Amelie Gillette	November 7, 2017	4AXT06	3.66
Nicole walks into a local lesbian bar while Honey and Jessica are having a drink there. Nicole comes out to her stepmom while also saying she plays for the bar's softball team. The two ponder how to break the news to Marvin. Jessica convinces the bar owner to let her manage the softball team, while Louis tries to assemble a ragtag group for the Cattleman's softball team. Sure enough, Louis and Jessica square off in the first scheduled game of the season.
67	7	"The Day After Thanksgiving"	Sean Kavanagh	Keith Heisler	November 14, 2017	4AXT07	3.89
Trying to play matchmaker, Louis invites Grandma's ESL teacher Bernard (George Takei) to Thanksgiving dinner, fully knowing that Jessica planned to forego a big Thanksgiving meal and instead prepare for Black Friday shopping with Honey. Elsewhere, Evan starts acting differently after Eddie and Emery sneak him into a theater to see a scary movie.
68	8	"The Vouch"	Josh Greenbaum	Eric Ziobrowski	November 21, 2017	4AXT08	4.29
Jessica has finished her book and asks Louis to read it. Louis hates it, but tells Jessica it is great. Upon hearing that Kenny Rogers will be visiting Cattleman's, Jessica asks Louis to share it with his boss, because Rogers is also a published author. Afraid to do so, Louis has the neighborhood book club women read the story, knowing they will be brutally honest in their assessment, but Jessica just attributes it to the women not liking her and refuses to back off on the Kenny Rogers request. Meanwhile, Eddie learns a little about democracy when his brothers and friends chip in to help him purchase a 300-CD carousel and then insist on loading it with CDs that Eddie hates.
69	9	"Slide Effect"	Sasie Sealy	Erica Oyama	December 5, 2017	4AXT09	3.76
Eddie's friends have all taken up lame, uncool activities at school, including Trent, who is a school safety officer. When Trent writes up Eddie for wearing open-toed shoes, he lands in detention and soon links up with the hackey-sack clique. Eddie helps the guys retrieve their confiscated hackey-sacks from the principal's office, but gets in way more trouble than he bargained for when one of them steals money from the principal's petty cash drawer. Elsewhere, Jessica labors over submitting a cover photo for her new book, not liking any of the ones Honey took, and soon realizes her apprehension is fear of possible rejection of the book itself by the reading public.
70	10	"Do You Hear What I Hear?"	Sasie Sealy	Matt Kuhn	December 12, 2017	4AXT10	3.91
As head of the HOA Christmas committee, Jessica threatens to cut this year's neighborhood caroling due to last year's rocky performance. However, Deirdre says that her friend Holly (Paula Abdul), who teaches "Performance and Movement", will help get everyone into tip-top, melodic shape. Meanwhile, Marvin becomes suspicious of Honey when she goes to see Titanic at the movies without him, and Nicole develops her first girl crush, but needs help from Eddie, Emery, and Alison to get the other girl's attention.
71	11	"Big Baby"	Jude Weng	Sheng Wang	January 2, 2018	4AXT11	4.23
Honey's hyper-critical mother (Cheryl Hines) is visiting, making Honey turn to Jessica as a buffer for an upcoming alternative baby-care class that she knows her mother will criticize. But, when Jessica finds the class ridiculous, she disappoints her friend by siding with her mother. Meanwhile, Louis and Marvin go on the cruise that Jessica and Honey won on Wheel of Fortune, but the trip quickly goes south for Louis. Also, Eddie thinks a new girl at the school has fallen for him, until Trent exposes evidence that the girl may just have a thing for Asian guys.
72	12	"Liar Liar"	Kevin Bray	Abbey Caldwell	January 9, 2018	4AXT12	3.64
When trying to play wingman for Nicole as she tries to ask out Jackie, Eddie encourages his friend to be herself, but Nicole is reluctant because she and Jackie have little in common. Louis joins Matthew's bowling group, which has Jessica concerned about the way he always overextends himself with new friends. Meanwhile, Evan and Emery try to get Honey to simplify her hair and wardrobe when she is constantly late taking them to outings, but Honey is resistant to the pregnancy clothes the boys choose for her.
73	13	"The Car Wash"	Amy York Rubin	Cindy Fang	January 16, 2018	4AXT13	3.91
Remembering that they used to enjoy hand-washing their vehicle together, Louis asks Jessica to do so as a way to reconnect. When Jessica is too busy meeting with her book editor and making revisions, Louis gets advice from Marvin on how to rekindle the seemingly dwindling flame in his marriage. Meanwhile, Evan is placed into Emery's literature class that is taught by Ms. Doris (Tig Notaro) and competes with his brother to be the new teacher's pet. The two are frustrated when Ms. Doris seems to dislike both of them and shocked to learn that she really liked Eddie when he was her student.
74	14	"A Man to Share the Night With"	Angela Tortu	David Smithyman	January 30, 2018	4AXT15	4.05
After seeing that Eddie has started shaving, Louis decides his son is old enough to stay up with him through the first guest on the Late Show with David Letterman. But, after one night watching the show with his dad, Eddie takes advantage of his new 11:45 bed time and goes trolling around town with his friend Dave, which cause a falling out between father and son. Eventually, Louis comes to Eddie's aid when Dave starts to get erratic, even going so far as to steal a store's mannequin. Meanwhile, Jessica uses figure skater Michelle Kwan as an example to preach hard work and discipline to Emery and Evan. This causes problems when Tara Lipinski wins Olympic gold instead of Kwan, so Jessica decides to come up with a conspiracy theory to explain Kwan's loss, which even Jessica starts to believe, as well. Jessica begrudgingly accepts that Kwan lost, but Evan and Emery convince her that it was a conspiracy for her sake.
75	15	"We Need to Talk About Evan"	Anya Adams	Josh Kirby & Jon Veles	January 30, 2018	4AXT14	3.46
Lincoln Middle School starts its Student of the Month program and Evan is not the first winner. Jessica, hoping to use the award to one-up her new frenemy Amy (Angela Kinsey), pushes Evan to participate in more school activities. As Evan overextends himself, the stress leads to an angry meltdown at a club meeting, forcing him to see the school counselor to Jessica's annoyance. At Cattleman's, Louis gets tired of all the patrons thinking Kenny Rogers is the genius behind the restaurant so, with Matthew's blessing, Louis gets a menu item named after himself. He then goes overboard trying to push Louis Huang's 5-Alarm Chili on all the customers. Eventually, Matthew pretends to be a customer to buy the chili in order to get the ball rolling. Unfortunately, that backfires when it is revealed Matthew is allergic to one of the key ingredient in the chili. Elsewhere, Eddie and Emery decide it is time they learn how to unhook a bra.
76	16	"Ride the Tiger"	Bill Purple	Jeff Chiang	February 6, 2018	4AXT16	3.79
On Chinese New Year, Emery is happy to have his bad luck year behind him and decides to ask his school crush to a dance. When things do not go so well, Emery questions if his luck has really changed, causing Louis to secretly help turn his son's fortunes. The Huangs have a contest to speak only in Mandarin, with those who are the first to speak English in the new year getting knocked out. It is down to Evan and Jessica, which causes a dilemma for the latter when she is invited to discuss her book on a local TV show. Meanwhile, Eddie does not receive his usual red envelope from Big Auntie and learns from Grandma that Big Auntie is mad at him for something.
77	17	"Let Me Go, Bro"	Erin O'Malley	Laura McCreary	February 27, 2018	4AXT17	3.29
When Louis and Jessica praise Eddie for his first time making the honor roll, Evan gets mad because they do not know about all the secret stuff he does to make sure Eddie is prepared for school. Though Evan eventually realizes Eddie is more grown up and does not need him anymore, Eddie later thanks him for all he did. Jessica does a ride-along with a local cop after her editors say her book lacks authenticity. Though much of the day is boring, the two eventually come upon a dead body, making Jessica throw up. Meanwhile, Louis gets a call from Kenny Rogers regarding Kenny Rogers' Roasters' pending bankruptcy. Rogers offers Louis the opportunity to buy out his share of the restaurant for pennies on the dollar, then orders Louis to tell Matthew he is fired. After Louis shares the news, he immediately hires Matthew to work for him.
78	18	"Measure Twice, Cut Once"	Sean Kavanagh	Keith Heisler	March 13, 2018	4AXT18	3.07
Jessica is frustrated when Louis is unable to make a decision on buying out Kenny Rogers' share of Cattleman's, as Louis endlessly weighs pros and cons. Meanwhile, Eddie and Emery are tired of "Lent Evan," who has given up watching his favorite show Regis & Kathie Lee, but does record it for viewing after Lent is over. Eddie and Emery taunt him by discussing episodes in his presence, even though they have not really viewed any episodes.
79	19	"King in the North"	Erin O'Malley	Matt Kuhn	March 20, 2018	4AXT19	3.61
Jessica is collecting praise quotes from various people to put on her book jacket and is particularly eager to receive a quote from Stephen King. When King writes back to say he does not give recommendations to any authors, Jessica is convinced the letter came from one of King's publicists and goes on a road trip to Maine with an unsuspecting Honey in tow. At school, Eddie and his friends (including Alison and Nicole) are excited to go to the spring dance all wearing orange and blue tuxedos like the main characters in Dumb and Dumber. When the school sends out a notice that boys must wear suits and girls must wear dresses, initiated by Ned as payback, Eddie and Nicole decide to rebel and defy the order. Meanwhile, Louis becomes concerned when Grandma wants to leave the house and move to a retirement community.

=== Season 5 (2018–19) ===
No. overall	No. in season	Title	Directed by	Written by	Original release date	Prod. code	US viewers (millions)
80	1	"Fresh Off the RV"	Anya Adams	Matt Kuhn	October 5, 2018	5AXT01	2.85
Jessica's book is released, but it sells less than a hundred copies on the first day. Not wanting the family to know the truth, she tells them it is a huge success, prompting Louis to buy a used RV to take Jessica around on her book tour. Honey delivers a baby girl, but she and Marvin cannot agree on a name. Meanwhile, Nicole tells Eddie that she is leaving for a school in New York, which leaves him wondering how he will carry on without her advice and support.
81	2	"The Hand that Sits the Cradle"	Michael Spiller	Amelie Gillette	October 12, 2018	5AXT03	2.69
Jessica takes up residence with Honey and Marvin, insisting that she tend to Honey's every need as she recovers from giving birth. After a few days of being driven crazy, Honey learns from Grandma Jenny that Jessica is avoiding having to face up to the failure of her book. Elsewhere, Louis tries to bond with Evan in Jessica's absence, while Eddie and Emery make a half-hearted attempt at working out after watching the film Pumping Iron.
82	3	"Working the 'Ween"	Jay Chandrasekhar	Laura McCreary	October 19, 2018	5AXT04	2.87
Louis and Jessica offer to babysit baby Maria to let Marvin and Honey have a badly needed night out. In doing so, they learn secrets about how each took care of their three boys when they were infants. At home, Emery and Evan hand out candy as Fox Mulder and Dana Scully when a girl begins showing up several times in a different dress which annoys the two thinking she is just trying to get more candy. After she arrives a fourth time, the boys refuse to give her candy and she goes back to her mother and sisters revealing they were quadruplets and so in revenge, the girls egg the house. Meanwhile, Eddie takes a job at a local furniture store, and offers to work their Halloween night sale.
83	4	"Driver's Eddie"	Anya Adams	Keith Heisler	November 2, 2018	5AXT02	2.87
With Eddie beginning driver's ed at school, he asks Louis and Jessica to let him practice behind the wheel like his friends have all done. His parents insist that he go through the full educational program first before practicing, but Louis changes his mind when he experiences "Asian driver" stereotyping during an incident on the road. Elsewhere, Evan is upset that Grandma invites only Emery to hang out in her room, later learning that they both get annoyed by Evan correcting every detail of her stories.
84	5	"Mo' Chinese Mo' Problems"	Claire Scanlon	Jeff Chiang	November 9, 2018	5AXT05	3.05
While volunteering for the census, Evan tips off his parents to a new Chinese couple that has moved into the neighborhood. Louis and Jessica quickly bond with Julius (Reggie Lee) and Elaine (Ming-Na Wen), but their elation sours as Jessica learns that Elaine's Harvard-educated son has an art degree and drives a cab while Louis feels like Julius is moving in on his best friend, Marvin. Meanwhile, Eddie and Emery offer to help Evan in his census work, but Evan soon learns his brothers have ulterior motives.
85	6	"Sub Standard"	Angela Tortu	Eric Ziobrowski	November 16, 2018	5AXT06	3.47
Eddie's English teacher takes an extended leave of absence and is replaced by Mr. Grant (Ryan Hansen), a substitute teacher. Jessica disagrees with Mr. Grant's alternative teaching methods, even though Eddie is flourishing in the new environment. Elsewhere, Louis and Honey would both like to lose some weight, so they join a couple of exercise groups. Neither group is what they expected, and Honey later learns that she is pregnant again.
86	7	"Where Have All the Cattlemen Gone?"	Josh Greenbaum	Erica Oyama	December 7, 2018	5AXT07	2.78
After Matthew unexpectedly quits his job at Cattleman's, Louis asks Eddie to work at the restaurant. However, wanting to stay independent, and hearing of a promotion at his current job, Eddie rejects his offer, so Louis hires Trent instead. When his promotion turns out to be no good, Eddie tries to get Trent to quit, backstabbing a coupon he created to get him to quit. Jessica tries to convince Amy (Angela Kinsey) to name her the new PTA president after unsuccessfully trying to become a principal while Emery and Evan argue over who is the funniest brother.
87	8	"Cousin Eddie"	Sean Kavanagh	Rachna Fruchbom	December 14, 2018	5AXT08	2.92
Eddie tries to get Jessica to be flexible with her Christmas traditions and let him visit Nicole in New York. When acting grown up fails, he decides to vandalize her prized Christmas angel. Jessica freaks out but admits to Eddie afterwards that she does not want Christmas to change because it reminds her of when he was just a baby and she is afraid that he is growing up. Meanwhile, Louis and Evan try unsuccessfully to help Emery find his "go to" friend to invite to Christmas, with Evan finally giving up and choosing for him. However, Emery realizes that Evan is his "go to" friend, always willing and ready to do anything for him.
88	9	"Just the Two of Us"	Angela Tortu	Teresa Hsiao	January 4, 2019	5AXT09	3.25
Louis and Jessica win a radio contest prize of a weekend vacation at a posh resort, but when they arrive, they realize it is a retreat for couples therapy. Still without his license, Eddie takes advantage of his parents' absence to drive the Cattleman's wagon to Trent's party without an adult to accompany him. Later, Grandma reveals some secrets from her past that surprise Eddie.
89	10	"You've Got a Girlfriend"	Alisa Statman	Abbey Caldwell	January 11, 2019	5AXT10	3.18
When Evan reveals he has a girlfriend (Julia Garcia), Jessica is convinced it will affect his grades and tries to end the relationship. Meanwhile, Honey and Emery take hopeless romantic Louis to see the film You've Got Mail, and are later shocked when he says he did not like it.
90	11	"Driver's Eddie 2: Orlando Drift"	Anya Adams	Josh Kirby & Jon Veles	January 18, 2019	5AXT11	3.40
Eddie finally gets his driver's license, but it comes at a price as Jessica insists he start helping with her errands. Eddie rebels when the errands interfere with taking his friends to the Insane Clown Posse concert. Meanwhile, Louis is taken aback when Honey invites herself to tag along with Marvin on the men's trip to the Panama City chili cook-off.
91	12	"Legends of the Fortieth"	Josh Greenbaum	Eric Ziobrowski	January 25, 2019	5AXT13	3.36
Louis is obsessed with the great outdoors after seeing new movie Legends of the Fall; for his 40th birthday, Louis decides that the family needs to go camping, but the kids try to convince him otherwise; Honey gives Jessica birthday gift tips.
92	13	"Grand-Mahjong"	Kyle Weber	Cindy Fang	February 1, 2019	5AXT12	3.30
Elaine tries to give Jessica tips on building a better relationship with Grandma Huang. Louis challenges Emery to a "good luck" wrestling match to start Chinese New Year, after seeing his Asian neighbor Julius do the same with his son, Horace.
93	14	"Cupid's Crossbow"	Phil Traill	Cory Caplan	February 15, 2019	5AXT15	3.12
On Valentine's Day, Jessica and Louis compete to give Evan the best advice on how to celebrate with his new girlfriend; Eddie is passed a love note and asks Honey for help finding out who his secret admirer is.
94	15	"Be a Man"	Alisa Statman	Laura McCreary	February 22, 2019	5AXT14	3.06
When Evan starts acting out at school and is forced to miss his next fencing match, putting his perfect record in jeopardy, Jessica immediately blames it on Eddie's influence. It turns out that Evan has ulterior motives. Elsewhere, Marvin volunteers to help Grandma Huang with some tasks that Louis hates, but later Louis becomes convinced that the two are gossiping about him and he enlists Emery's help in eavesdropping.
95	16	"Trentina"	Sean Kavanagh	Jaime Block	March 1, 2019	5AXT16	2.93
Eddie learns that his secret admirer is Trent's sister Tina. Trent warns him to stay away from his sister, not for her protection but for Eddie's. Louis is proud that Cattleman's has earned the Golden Prune award from a retiree publication, but when word of the award gets around the elderly community, there are unintended consequences. Meanwhile, Evan fails the mile run portion of the President's Physical Fitness Test, and tries to get a reluctant Jessica to join him in training for a local 5K race.
96	17	"These Boots Are Made for Walkin'"	Amy York Rubin	David Smithyman	March 8, 2019	5AXT17	3.09
Emery starts skipping his volleyball practice, prompting Louis and Evan to investigate. Louis discovers Emery taking up line dancing in a bar, and understands that his son needs some time to find himself. Meanwhile, Eddie gets fed up with Jessica's rules when she refuses to let him go to a cultural exchange in Taiwan. He decides to leave home and live in Horace's apartment. When Jessica goes to confront Eddie, she is surprised to see he is actually taking good care of himself and that her harsh education allowed Eddie to be more mature than she thought. She reconsiders, and decides Eddie is responsible enough to go to Taiwan.
97	18	"Rancho Contento"	Jude Weng	Amelie Gillette	March 15, 2019	5AXT18	2.94
Louis announces to Jessica that he has opened an IRA, sparking an argument about when they should retire. Louis' desired retirement age is 55, while Jessica's is "never". Louis then secretly takes Jessica on a tour of a retirement community. Meanwhile, Eddie works to become a more insightful person in hopes of winning back Tina.
98	19	"Vice Mommy"	Amy York Rubin	Erica Oyama	March 22, 2019	5AXT19	2.92
With Jessica set to begin her to college classes, she names Evan as her Vice-Mommy but Evan finally finds his mother needs some help. Meanwhile, Louis has decided to name Eddie the Cattleman's employee of the month, but soon regrets it when Eddie questions his motives and says dad should be more of a boss at work.
99	20	"Nerd Watching"	Kristin Rapinchuck	Keith Heisler	March 29, 2019	5AXT20	2.55
Evan finds himself jealous of Eddie's coolness when his older brother becomes a sort of mentor for his nerdy friends. Meanwhile, Louis and Emery conspire against Jessica when they believe Grandma has been scammed and Jessica calls her husband gullible.
100	21	"Under the Taipei Sun"	Chris Koch	Jeff Chiang	April 5, 2019	5AXT21	3.05
Eddie finally goes to Taiwan only to end up separated from his group, without any money or language skills, until a man rescues him. Back in Orlando, Louis and the boys try to convince Jessica that she misses Eddie.
101	22	"No Apology Necessary"	Josh Greenbaum	Matt Kuhn	April 12, 2019	5AXT22	3.08
Eddie creates a diplomatic incident while ordering lunch in Taiwan and is catapulted back to America. To cover his mistakes, Jessica agrees to temporarily receive a Taiwanese girl. Meanwhile, Louis continues to apologize, although Jessica tells him that he does this all the time.

=== Season 6 (2019–20) ===
No. overall	No. in season	Title	Directed by	Written by	Original release date	Prod. code	US viewers (millions)
102	1	"Help Unwanted?"	Kourtney Kang	Cindy Fang	September 27, 2019	6AXT02	2.34
While Jessica doesn't approve of Emery taking drama as an elective, Honey helps him prepare for a role anyway, leading to the two women arguing about how much they should be in each other's lives. Evan appears rattled upon seeing Brandi Chastain remove her shirt after scoring the winning goal for Team USA, causing Louis and Eddie to realize that the youngest Huang needs "the talk".
103	2	"College"	Phil Traill	Keith Heisler	October 4, 2019	6AXT01	2.32
When Eddie is non-committal about going to college, Louis organizes a trip to UCLA after learning that Eddie's cousin is enrolled there. Meanwhile, Evan and Emery prepare for a post-Y2K world.
104	3	"Grandma's Boys"	Sean Kavanagh	Jeff Chiang	October 11, 2019	6AXT03	2.24
During Marvin's retirement party, Grandma Huang announces that she too is "retiring". After Louis throws her a party, Grandma insists on getting a hot tub for her retirement gift. This prompts Louis to invite Gene to the home, hoping his irritating brother will make Grandma realize how lucky she is to be living with Louis. Meanwhile, Evan and the boys worry that Marvin's retirement means the end of dentist-patient confidentiality, as Evan may have revealed their secret trip to Georgia while sedated in Marvin's chair.
105	4	"S'Mothered"	Sean Kavanagh	Emily Cutler	October 18, 2019	6AXT04	2.46
Eddie is afraid of Jessica finally meeting his girlfriend Tina, given that both women have strong personalities. It's even worse than he thought when they meet and actually get along well, bonding over how much Eddie can improve. Meanwhile, Louis starts to wonder if a restaurant owner is all he will ever be, and he tries his hand at some different professions.
106	5	"Hal-lou-Ween"	Steven J. Kung	Josh Kirby & Jon Veles	October 25, 2019	6AXT05	2.37
After Jessica refuses to let Louis set up a haunted house at the Huang home, he decides to set one up at Cattleman's, while still finding a way to trick his wife into developing some Halloween spirit. Meanwhile, Evan and Emery cannot think of any good ideas for their annual couples costume, so they convince Eddie to join them in a trio costume.
107	6	"Chestnut Gardens"	Kristin Rapinichuk	Cory Caplan	November 1, 2019	6AXT06	2.43
Former Cattleman's manager Matthew Chestnut returns and Louis welcomes him with open arms, but Jessica, Eddie and Trent are suspicious of his motives. Meanwhile, Evan and Emery consult Marvin for romantic advice, and find Marvin's old-school views of women and relationships to be alarming.
108	7	"Practicum?!"	Angela Tortu	Aaron Ho	November 15, 2019	6AXT07	2.36
As part of the requirements for her degree, Jessica has to shadow a teacher and selects Evan's school when she sees changes in his behavior that might affect his academics. She ends up shadowing Evan instead, embarrassing him in front of his friends and driving him crazy. Elsewhere, Louis is disappointed when Eddie chooses Allen Iverson as his "hero" for a school essay, and Louis proceeds to do all he can to convince Eddie that he's more than just a father.
109	8	"TMI: Too Much Integrity"	Jay Chandrasekhar	Samantha Riley	November 22, 2019	6AXT08	2.32
Louis believes he's found his true calling: consulting with people who want to get small businesses off the ground. He makes a reluctant Honey his first client after he encourages her to start a blog called TMI (True Mommy Insights). Meanwhile, the neighborhood association has decided to put a piazza in the middle of the cul-de-sac. Jessica gets discouraged when the boys want to spend all their time with neighbors on the piazza instead of with her.
110	9	"Lou Wants to Be a Millionaire"	Kim Nguyen	Kyle Lau	November 29, 2019	6AXT10	2.06
Louis is selected to be a contestant on Who Wants to Be a Millionaire?. During a break in filming, he argues with Eddie about a hybrid Chinese/American item that Eddie created and wants to add to the Cattleman's menu. Louis rejected it, stating he never wanted to be judged for his Asian heritage and therefore wants his restaurant to have 100% American cuisine. After realizing he is proud to be both Asian and American, he relents. Louis then uses Eddie as his phone-a-friend, instead of using Evan who is waiting at home, which backfires. Meanwhile, Jessica and Emery argue over his passion to become an actor, but eventually come to an understanding.
111	10	"Jessica Town"	Angela Tortu	Eric Ziobrowski	December 13, 2019	6AXT09	2.29
In an alternate reality, Jessica becomes the mayor of Jessica Town, where it is Christmas all the time and she is in charge. However, in the real world, Jessica has to trust those around her to pull off the perfect Christmas, and she is greatly disappointed. Meanwhile, Honey asks Eddie and Evan to guard a gift she bought for Marvin, but the boys play with it and break it. This causes Evan to do something he's never done before, but Grandma is there to save the boys from themselves.
112	11	"A Seat at the Table"	Anya Adams	Ria Sardana	January 17, 2020	6AXT11	2.39
Jessica is surprised when Deidre agrees to recommend her for an open position as dean at her kids' private school. However, Jessica is soon disappointed when she learns she was a diversity hire and the position has no real authority. With help from Louis, an undeterred Jessica finds a way to make herself heard at the school. Meanwhile, Evan is recruited for the high school mathlete team and is excited to hang with his brothers, only to find out that Eddie and Emery don't really like to hang together at school.
113	12	"The Magic Motor Inn"	Kristin Rapinchuk	Rachna Fruchbom	January 24, 2020	6AXT12	2.36
Needing only a spelling bee trophy to complete his academic "triathlon", Evan accepts Eddie's help when he assures him he can get classmate and former bee champion Simryn to coach him. Evan soon learns Eddie has an ulterior motive: helping Jessica's favorite child to gain favor when his expected low SAT scores arrive. However, to Eddie's shock, he scores very well on the SATs. Meanwhile, Jessica pressures Emery to get a job, but to her dismay, he gets hired as a shirtless model for a mall clothing store.
114	13	"Mommy and Me"	Kyle Weber	Jamie Block	January 31, 2020	6AXT13	2.25
Right after Jessica gives Honey stern advice on how to handle her clingy daughter Maria, Evan starts clinging to Jessica following a breakup with his girlfriend. Elsewhere, Emery wants to continue to accompany Eddie and Louis as they review various burger restaurants, despite deciding to become a vegan.
115	14	"Family Van"	Anya Adams	Talia Bernstein	February 21, 2020	6AXT14	3.00
When the trusty family minivan takes a turn for the worse, Jessica and Louis each process the loss in their own way. Meanwhile, Eddie convinces his brothers to take a road trip with him to find their Washington, D.C. time capsule.
116	15	"Commencement"	Randall Park	Matt Kuhn	February 21, 2020	6AXT15	2.39
In the future, Louis and Jessica are shown attending a Harvard graduation. In the present, Eddie gets a letter from Harvard stating he will be visited by an alum, which turns out to be Andy Richter who is filling in for Harvard alum Conan O'Brien. After interviewing Eddie while Jessica constantly butts in, Richter says it's unlikely that a child of such a "helicopter parent" will do well at Harvard. Jessica blames herself for Eddie not getting into Harvard, but Eddie reveals that he really wants to attend culinary school. Meanwhile, Evan and Emery have a disagreement when Evan is writing his memoirs and steals some of Emery's stories as his own. In the future again, it's revealed that the Harvard graduation is Evan's in 2008, with Louis, Jessica, Eddie, Emery and Grandma Jenny all attending the ceremony.

== Ratings ==
=== Season 1 (2015) ===
No.	Title	Air date	Rating/share (18–49)	Viewers (million)	DVR (18–49)	DVR viewers (million)	Total (18–49)	Total viewers (million)
1	"Pilot"	February 4, 2015	2.5/8	7.94	0.9	2.07	3.4	10.03
2	"Home Sweet Home-School"	February 4, 2015	2.3/7	7.47	—N/a	—N/a	—N/a	—N/a
3	"The Shunning"	February 10, 2015	1.7/6	6.05	—N/a	—N/a	—N/a	—N/a
4	"Success Perm"	February 10, 2015	1.8/6	5.86	—N/a	—N/a	—N/a	—N/a
5	"Persistent Romeo"	February 17, 2015	1.9/6	6.17	—N/a	—N/a	—N/a	—N/a
6	"Fajita Man"	February 24, 2015	1.8/6	5.79	—N/a	—N/a	—N/a	—N/a
7	"Showdown at the Golden Saddle"	March 3, 2015	1.7/6	6.02	—N/a	—N/a	—N/a	—N/a
8	"Phillip Goldstein"	March 10, 2015	1.6/6	5.08	0.9	—N/a	2.5	—N/a
9	"License to Sell"	March 24, 2015	1.4/5	4.92	0.6	—N/a	2.0	—N/a
10	"Blind Spot"	March 31, 2015	1.3/5	4.83	0.8	—N/a	2.1	—N/a
11	"Very Superstitious"	April 7, 2015	1.4/5	4.85	—N/a	—N/a	—N/a	—N/a
12	"Dribbling Tiger, Bounce Pass Dragon"	April 14, 2015	1.5/5	4.76	—N/a	—N/a	—N/a	—N/a
13	"So Chineez"	April 21, 2015	1.5/5	5.08	—N/a	—N/a	—N/a	—N/a

=== Season 2 (2015–16) ===
No.	Title	Air date	Rating/share (18–49)	Viewers (millions)	DVR (18–49)	DVR viewers (millions)	Total (18–49)	Total viewers (millions)
1	"Family Business Trip"	September 22, 2015	1.9/7	6.05	0.7	1.51	2.6	7.56
2	"Boy II Man"	September 29, 2015	1.7/6	4.74	0.7	1.61	2.4	6.35
3	"Shaquille O'Neal Motors"	October 6, 2015	1.8/6	4.85	—N/a	—N/a	—N/a	—N/a
4	"The Fall Ball"	October 13, 2015	1.4/4	3.96	TBA	TBA	TBA	TBA
5	"Miracle on Dead Street"	October 27, 2015	1.5/5	4.07	TBA	TBA	TBA	TBA
6	"Good Morning Orlando"	November 3, 2015	1.6/5	4.45	TBA	TBA	TBA	TBA
7	"The Big 1-2"	November 10, 2015	1.3/4	3.77	TBA	TBA	TBA	TBA
8	"Huangsgiving"	November 17, 2015	1.4/4	3.90	TBA	TBA	TBA	TBA
9	"We Done Son"	December 1, 2015	1.3/4	3.66	0.7	1.48	2.0	5.14
10	"The Real Santa"	December 8, 2015	1.2/4	3.94	0.7	—N/a	1.9	—N/a
11	"Year of the Rat"	February 2, 2016	1.4/5	5.19	—N/a	—N/a	—N/a	—N/a
12	"Love and Loopholes"	February 9, 2016	1.2/4	4.23	—N/a	—N/a	—N/a	—N/a
13	"Phil's Phaves"	February 16, 2016	1.3/4	4.64	—N/a	—N/a	—N/a	—N/a
14	"Michael Chang Fever"	February 23, 2016	1.2/4	4.59	—N/a	—N/a	—N/a	—N/a
15	"Keep 'Em Separated"	March 8, 2016	1.4/5	4.94	—N/a	—N/a	—N/a	—N/a
16	"Tight Two"	March 15, 2016	1.1/4	4.10	—N/a	—N/a	—N/a	—N/a
17	"Doing it Right"	March 22, 2016	1.2/4	4.63	—N/a	—N/a	—N/a	—N/a
18	"Week in Review"	March 29, 2016	1.2/4	4.63	—N/a	—N/a	—N/a	—N/a
19	"Jessica Place"	April 5, 2016	1.1/4	4.23	—N/a	—N/a	—N/a	—N/a
20	"Hi, My Name Is..."	April 26, 2016	1.3/5	4.70	—N/a	—N/a	—N/a	—N/a
21	"Rent Day"	May 3, 2016	1.1/4	4.29	—N/a	—N/a	—N/a	—N/a
22	"Gotta Be Me"	May 10, 2016	0.9/3	3.91	—N/a	—N/a	—N/a	—N/a
23	"The Manchurian Dinner Date"	May 17, 2016	1.1/4	4.23	—N/a	—N/a	—N/a	—N/a
24	"Bring the Pain"	May 24, 2016	1.2/5	4.88	—N/a	—N/a	—N/a	—N/a

=== Season 3 (2016–17) ===
No.	Title	Air date	Rating/share (18–49)	Viewers (millions)	DVR (18–49)	DVR viewers (millions)	Total (18–49)	Total viewers (millions)
1	"Coming from America"	October 11, 2016	1.6/5	5.03	—N/a	—N/a	—N/a	—N/a
2	"Breaking Chains"	October 18, 2016	1.3/5	4.10	—N/a	—N/a	—N/a	—N/a
3	"Louisween"	October 25, 2016	1.2/4	3.98	—N/a	—N/a	—N/a	—N/a
4	"Citizen Jessica"	November 1, 2016	1.1/4	3.51	—N/a	—N/a	—N/a	—N/a
5	"No Thanks-giving"	November 15, 2016	1.3/5	4.28	—N/a	—N/a	—N/a	—N/a
6	"WWJD: What Would Jessica Do?"	November 29, 2016	1.3/5	4.20	—N/a	—N/a	—N/a	—N/a
7	"The Taming of the Dads"	December 6, 2016	1.1/4	3.88	—N/a	—N/a	—N/a	—N/a
8	"Where are the Giggles?"	December 13, 2016	1.2/4	3.86	—N/a	1.34	—N/a	5.24
9	"How to Be An American"	January 3, 2017	1.4/5	4.37	—N/a	—N/a	—N/a	—N/a
10	"The Best of Orlando"	January 17, 2017	1.2/4	3.91	—N/a	—N/a	—N/a	—N/a
11	"Clean Slate"	January 18, 2017	1.5/6	5.50	—N/a	—N/a	—N/a	—N/a
12	"Sisters Without Subtext"	February 7, 2017	1.2/4	3.82	—N/a	—N/a	—N/a	—N/a
13	"Neighbors with Attitude"	February 14, 2017	1.0/4	3.66	—N/a	—N/a	—N/a	—N/a
14	"The Gloves Are Off"	February 21, 2017	1.1/4	3.85	—N/a	—N/a	—N/a	—N/a
15	"Living While Eddie"	February 28, 2017	1.1/4	4.13	—N/a	—N/a	—N/a	—N/a
16	"Gabby Goose"	March 7, 2017	1.1/4	3.69	—N/a	—N/a	—N/a	—N/a
17	"The Flush"	March 14, 2017	1.1/4	3.37	—N/a	—N/a	—N/a	—N/a
18	"Time to Get Ill"	April 4, 2017	1.1/4	3.82	—N/a	—N/a	—N/a	—N/a
19	"Driving Miss Jenny"	April 11, 2017	1.1/4	3.71	—N/a	—N/a	—N/a	—N/a
20	"The Masters"	April 18, 2017	1.0/4	3.72	—N/a	—N/a	—N/a	—N/a
21	"Pie vs. Cake"	May 2, 2017	1.0/4	3.33	—N/a	—N/a	—N/a	—N/a
22	"This is Us"	May 9, 2017	1.0/4	3.43	—N/a	—N/a	—N/a	—N/a
23	"This isn't Us"	May 16, 2017	1.0/4	3.55	—N/a	—N/a	—N/a	—N/a

=== Season 4 (2017–18) ===
No.	Title	Air date	Rating/share (18–49)	Viewers (millions)	DVR (18–49)	DVR viewers (millions)	Total (18–49)	Total viewers (millions)
1	"B as in Best Friends"	October 3, 2017	1.4/5	4.51	—N/a	—N/a	—N/a	—N/a
2	"First Day"	October 10, 2017	1.1/4	4.08	—N/a	—N/a	—N/a	—N/a
3	"Kids"	October 17, 2017	1.1/4	3.93	—N/a	—N/a	—N/a	—N/a
4	"It's a Plastic Pumpkin, Louis Huang"	October 24, 2017	1.1/4	4.16	—N/a	—N/a	—N/a	—N/a
5	"Four Funerals and a Wedding"	October 31, 2017	0.9/4	3.53	—N/a	—N/a	—N/a	—N/a
6	"A League of Her Own"	November 7, 2017	1.0/4	3.66	—N/a	—N/a	—N/a	—N/a
7	"The Day After Thanksgiving"	November 14, 2017	1.1/4	3.89	—N/a	—N/a	—N/a	—N/a
8	"The Vouch"	November 21, 2017	1.1/4	4.29	—N/a	—N/a	—N/a	—N/a
9	"Slide Effect"	December 5, 2017	0.9/4	3.76	—N/a	—N/a	—N/a	—N/a
10	"Do You Hear What I Hear?"	December 12, 2017	1.0/4	3.91	—N/a	—N/a	—N/a	—N/a
11	"Big Baby"	January 2, 2018	1.2/5	4.23	—N/a	—N/a	—N/a	—N/a
12	"Liar Liar"	January 9, 2018	1.0/4	3.64	—N/a	—N/a	—N/a	—N/a
13	"The Car Wash"	January 16, 2018	1.0/4	3.91	—N/a	—N/a	—N/a	—N/a
14	"A Man to Share the Night With"	January 30, 2018	1.0/4	4.05	—N/a	—N/a	—N/a	—N/a
15	"We Need to Talk About Evan"	January 30, 2018	0.9/3	3.46	—N/a	—N/a	—N/a	—N/a
16	"Ride the Tiger"	February 6, 2018	0.9/3	3.79	—N/a	—N/a	—N/a	—N/a
17	"Let Me Go, Bro"	February 27, 2018	0.9/3	3.29	—N/a	—N/a	—N/a	—N/a
18	"Measure Twice, Cut Once"	March 13, 2018	0.9/3	3.07	—N/a	—N/a	—N/a	—N/a
19	"King in the North"	March 20, 2018	1.0/4	3.61	—N/a	—N/a	—N/a	—N/a

=== Season 5 (2018–19) ===
Viewership and ratings per episode of List of Fresh Off the Boat episodes
No.	Title	Air date	Rating/share (18–49)	Viewers (millions)	DVR (18–49)	DVR viewers (millions)	Total (18–49)	Total viewers (millions)
1	"Fresh Off the RV"	October 5, 2018	0.6/3	2.85	0.4	—N/a	1.0	—N/a
2	"The Hand that Sits the Cradle"	October 12, 2018	0.5/2	2.69	0.3	0.87	0.8	3.56
3	"Working the 'Ween"	October 19, 2018	0.6/3	2.87	0.3	0.78	0.9	3.65
4	"Driver's Eddie"	November 2, 2018	0.6/3	2.87	0.3	0.84	0.9	3.71
5	"Mo' Chinese Mo' Problems"	November 9, 2018	0.6/3	3.05	0.3	0.87	0.9	3.92
6	"Sub Standard"	November 16, 2018	0.7/3	3.47	0.3	0.79	1.0	4.26
7	"Where Have All the Cattlemen Gone?"	December 7, 2018	0.7/3	2.78	—N/a	—N/a	—N/a	—N/a
8	"Cousin Eddie"	December 14, 2018	0.5/2	2.92	0.3	0.86	0.8	3.79
9	"Just the Two of Us"	January 4, 2019	0.7/3	3.25	0.3	0.76	1.0	4.01
10	"You’ve Got a Girlfriend"	January 11, 2019	0.7/4	3.18	0.3	—N/a	1.0	—N/a
11	"Driver's Eddie 2: Orlando Drift"	January 18, 2019	0.7/4	3.40	—N/a	—N/a	—N/a	—N/a
12	"Legends of the Fortieth"	January 25, 2019	0.7/4	3.36	—N/a	—N/a	—N/a	—N/a
13	"Grand-Mahjong"	February 1, 2019	0.7/4	3.30	0.3	0.82	1.0	4.12
14	"Cupid’s Crossbow"	February 15, 2019	0.7/4	3.12	—N/a	—N/a	—N/a	—N/a
15	"Be a Man"	February 22, 2019	0.6/3	3.06	0.3	—N/a	0.9	—N/a
16	"Trentina"	March 1, 2019	0.6/3	2.93	—N/a	—N/a	—N/a	—N/a
17	"These Boots Are Made for Walkin'"	March 8, 2019	0.6/3	3.09	0.3	0.78	0.9	3.78
18	"Rancho Contento"	March 15, 2019	0.6/3	2.94	—N/a	—N/a	—N/a	—N/a
19	"Vice Mommy"	March 22, 2019	0.6/3	2.92	0.3	0.81	0.9	3.73
20	"Nerd Watching"	March 29, 2019	0.5/3	2.55	0.3	0.74	0.8	3.29
21	"Under the Taipei Sun"	April 5, 2019	0.6/3	3.05	0.3	0.77	0.9	3.82
22	"No Apology Necessary"	April 12, 2019	0.6/3	3.08	0.3	0.86	0.9	3.94

=== Season 6 (2019–20) ===
Viewership and ratings per episode of List of Fresh Off the Boat episodes
No.	Title	Air date	Rating/share (18–49)	Viewers (millions)	DVR (18–49)	DVR viewers (millions)	Total (18–49)	Total viewers (millions)
1	"Help Unwanted?"	September 27, 2019	0.5/3	2.34	0.3	TBD	0.8	TBD
2	"College"	October 4, 2019	0.4/3	2.32	TBD	TBD	TBD	TBD
3	"Grandma's Boys"	October 11, 2019	0.3/2	2.24	TBD	TBD	TBD	TBD
4	"S'Mothered"	October 18, 2019	0.5/3	2.46	TBD	TBD	TBD	TBD
5	"Hal-lou-Ween"	October 25, 2019	0.5/3	2.37	TBD	TBD	TBD	TBD
6	"Chestnut Gardens"	November 1, 2019	0.5/3	2.43	TBD	TBD	TBD	TBD
7	"Practicum?!"	November 15, 2019	0.5/3	2.36	TBD	TBD	TBD	TBD
8	"TMI: Too Much Integrity"	November 22, 2019	0.4/3	2.32	TBD	TBD	TBD	TBD
9	"Lou Wants to Be a Millionaire"	November 29, 2019	0.4/2	2.06	TBD	TBD	TBD	TBD
10	"Jessica Town"	December 13, 2019	0.4/3	2.29	TBD	TBD	TBD	TBD
11	"A Seat at the Table"	January 17, 2020	0.4/3	2.39	TBD	TBD	TBD	TBD
12	"The Magic Motor Inn"	January 24, 2020	0.5/3	2.36	TBD	TBD	TBD	TBD
13	"Mommy and Me"	January 31, 2020	0.4	2.25	TBD	TBD	TBD	TBD
14	"Family Van"	February 21, 2020	0.5	3.00	TBD	TBD	TBD	TBD
15	"Commencement"	February 21, 2020	0.4	2.39	TBD	TBD	TBD	TBD

=== Overall ratings ===
Fresh Off the Boat : U.S. viewers per episode (millions)

Season	Episode number																								Average
Season	1	2	3	4	5	6	7	8	9	10	11	12	13	14	15	16	17	18	19	20	21	22	23	24	Average
1	7.94	7.47	6.05	5.86	6.17	5.79	6.02	5.08	4.92	4.83	4.85	4.76	5.08	–											5.75
2	6.05	4.74	4.85	3.96	4.07	4.45	3.77	3.90	3.66	3.94	5.19	4.23	4.64	4.59	4.94	4.10	4.63	4.63	4.23	4.70	4.29	3.91	4.23	4.88	4.44
3	5.03	4.10	3.98	3.51	4.28	4.20	3.88	3.86	4.37	3.91	5.50	3.82	3.66	3.85	4.13	3.69	3.37	3.82	3.71	3.72	3.33	3.43	3.55	–	3.94
4	4.51	4.08	3.93	4.16	3.53	3.66	3.89	4.29	3.76	3.91	4.23	3.64	3.91	4.05	3.46	3.79	3.29	3.07	3.61	–					3.83
5	2.85	2.69	2.87	2.87	3.05	3.47	2.78	2.92	3.25	3.18	3.40	3.36	3.30	3.12	3.06	2.93	3.09	2.94	2.92	2.55	3.05	3.08	–		3.03
6	2.34	2.32	2.24	2.46	2.37	2.43	2.36	2.32	2.06	2.29	2.39	2.36	2.25	3.00	2.39	–									2.37

Audience measurement performed by Nielsen Media Research
