= Hudson Yang =

American actor (born 2003)

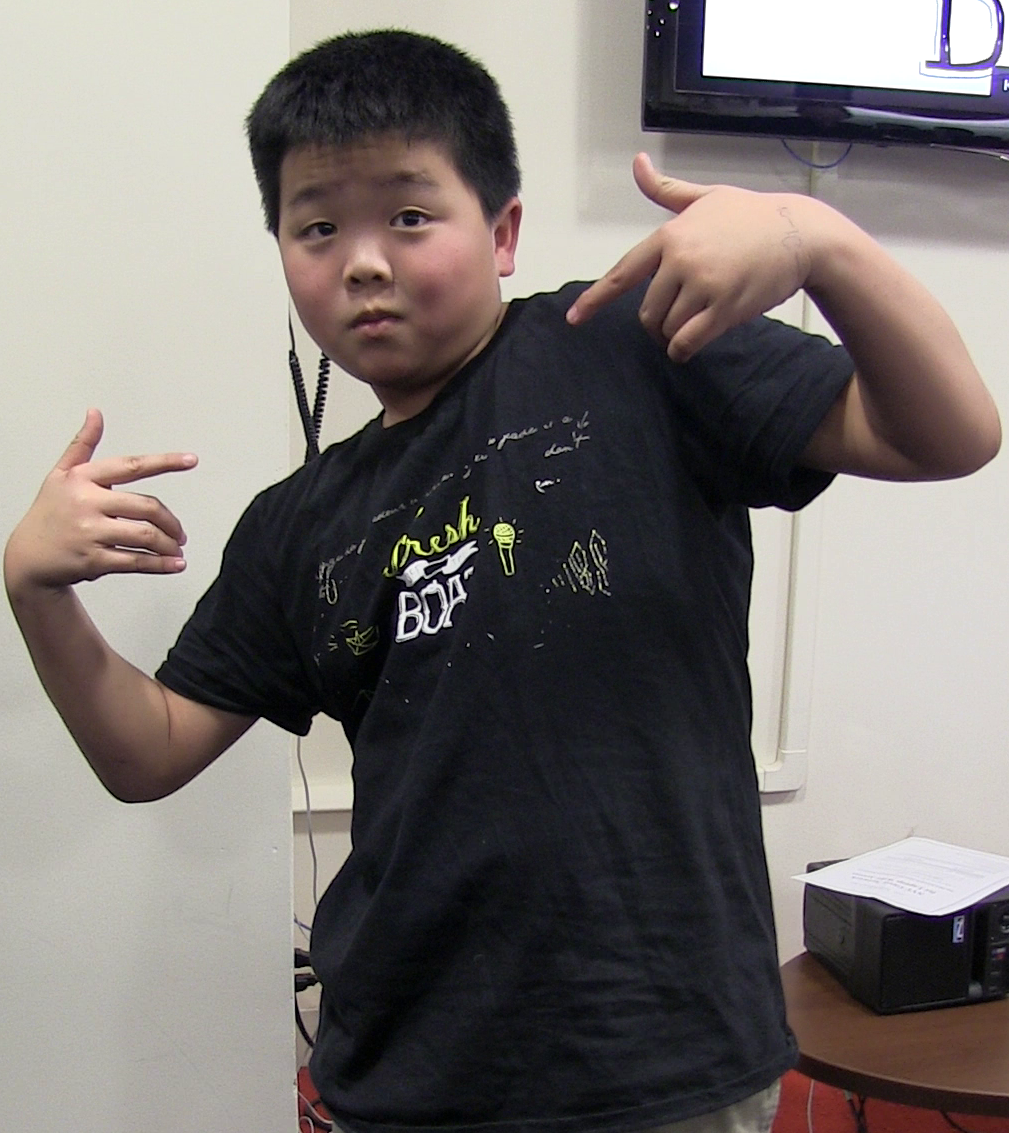
- Yang in 2015
- Born: Hudson David Yang; October 24, 2003 (age 23); New York City, U.S.
- Education: Harvard University
- Occupation: Actor
- Years active: 2014–present
- Father: Jeff Yang

Hudson Yang
- Traditional Chinese: 楊升德
- Simplified Chinese: 杨升德
Transcriptions
Standard Mandarin
- Hanyu Pinyin: Yáng Shēngdé

Hudson David Yang (born October 24, 2003) is an American actor. From 2015 to 2020, he starred as the lead actor in the ABC television series Fresh Off the Boat portraying Eddie Huang. Yang is the son of Jeff Yang, an American journalist, businessman, and business/media consultant.

== Early life and education ==
Yang was born Hudson David Yang to an American family on October 24, 2003, in New York City, New York. His parents are Jeff Yang, a Taiwanese American writer, journalist, businessman, and business/media consultant, and Heather Ying, a physician assistant who worked in cardiothoracic surgery.

Up until 2015, Yang attended NEST+M (New Explorations into Science Technology + Math) and The New York Performing Arts Academy's "FutureStar" Program.

In 2021, he was admitted to the Harvard University class of 2025.

== Career ==
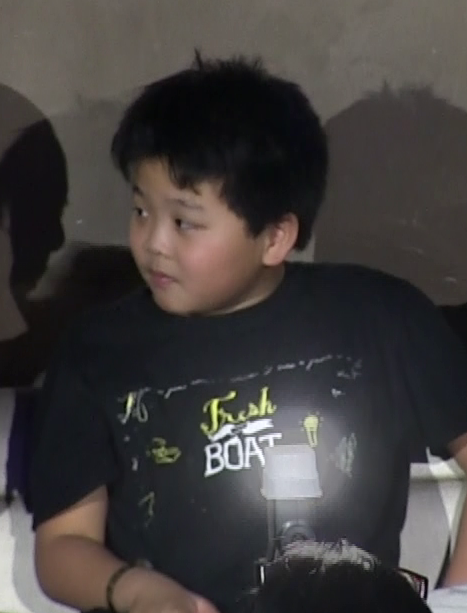
Yang at a panel discussion for Fresh Off the Boat, February 5, 2015

On May 9, 2014, he was interviewed by the Angry Asian Man as the Angry Reader of the Week, where he joked "it's all about the bling — cha-ching, cha-ching". Fresh Off the Boat, adapted from the memoir by chef Eddie Huang, was picked up by ABC on May 10, 2014, and premiered on February 4, 2015, with the first of the two preview episodes garnering 7.93 million viewers, becoming the second highest rated comedy premiere that season.

He appeared on The View on February 3, 2015, ahead of the show's debut and portrayed Henry in the mystery drama film The Sisterhood of Night.

In 2018, Yang and his father invested in a Vietnamese restaurant in Los Angeles, California.

In 2025, Yang documented his journey into the culinary world through his own National Geographic series Crash Course Cuisine With Hudson Yang.

== Filmography ==
Film and television roles
Year	Title	Role	Notes
2014	The Sisterhood of Night	Henry Huang	Feature film debut
2015–2020	Fresh Off the Boat	Eddie Huang	Main role; 116 episodes
2015	Cyberchase	Himself	Episode: "Fit to be Heroes"
2016	Liv & Maddie	Frankie Chang / "Doctor Questions"	Episode: "Coach-A-Rooney"
2017	Hum	Cho	Short film
2018	Sofia the First	Octavio (voice)	Episode: "Return to Merroway Cove"
2019	Where's Waldo?	Liu (voice)	Episode: "Little Trouble in Big China"
2019	The Lion Guard	Baliyo (voice)	7 episodes
2021	The Ray	Cal	
2022	Diary of a Wimpy Kid: Rodrick Rules	Larry (voice)	
2023	Order Up!	Himself	8 episodes
2023	Honor Student	Jeremy Chue	Also executive producer
2024	Extremely Unique Dynamic	Himself	
2025	Crash Course Cuisine With Hudson Yang	Himself	

== Awards and nominations ==
Year	Award	Category	Work	Result
2016	NAACP Image Awards	Outstanding Performance by a Youth (Series, Special, Television Movie or Mini-series)	Fresh Off the Boat	Nominated
2016	Young Artist Award	Outstanding Young Ensemble Cast In A TV Series	Fresh Off the Boat	Won
2016	Young Entertainer Awards	Best Young Ensemble Cast - TV Series	Fresh Off the Boat	Won
2016	Teen Choice Awards	Choice TV: Scene Stealer	Fresh Off the Boat	Nominated
2017	NAACP Image Awards	Outstanding Performance by a Youth (Series, Special, Television Movie or Mini-series)	Fresh Off the Boat	Nominated
2017	Young Artist Award	Best Performance in a TV Series - Leading Teen Actor	Fresh Off the Boat	Won
2017	Teen Choice Awards	Choice Comedy TV Actor	Fresh Off the Boat	Nominated
