= Taylor Takahashi =

American actor

- Born: September 7, 1992 (age 33); Alameda, California, U.S.
- Occupations: Actor; chef
- Years active: 2021-present

Taylor Takahashi (born September 7, 1992) is an American actor, chef, former basketball player, and personal assistant to Eddie Huang. He made his acting debut in Huang's first directorial effort, Boogie.

== Early life and career ==
Taylor Takahashi is a yonsei (fourth-generation Japanese-American). He was born and raised in Alameda, California and relocated to Orange County as an adult. In Alameda High School, he played basketball before becoming a personal trainer. He returned to his roots and joined a recreation league where he discovered that Eddie Huang was one of his teammates. They quickly bonded as Takahashi was a fan of his work and became employed as his personal assistant and worked as a chef in his restaurant, "I learned so much by being able to observe... he never treated me like, 'I'm your boss and you work for me.' It was always very open... 'If you want to explore relationships with them, my world is your world. And I want you to try to take advantage as much as you can.'" Huang showed Takahashi the script for a movie he was hoping to direct, Boogie, and continued to assist him on the project by training the actor chosen for the lead role. "I show up to the office about three and a half weeks into pre-production, and Eddie's standing at the front door... And he's like, 'What’s up? How you doing today? Give me your phone and give me your laptop. No distractions today.' And I was like, 'Am I fired? What happened?'" Takahashi was soon informed by Huang that the actor chosen was unable to take the role and had decided to cast him instead. Following the release of Boogie, Takahashi stated that he plans to continue acting and has started auditioning and taking acting classes to improve his craft.

== Filmography ==
Year	Title	Role	Notes	Ref.
2021	Boogie	Alfred 'Boogie' Chin		
2021	Unite the Bay: Stop Asian Hate	Subject	Short film	
2024	The Ghost Trap	Thongchai		
TBA	Keyz	Quan	Post-production	
