= Boogie (2021 film) =

2021 American drama film by Eddie Huang

- Theatrical release poster
- Directed by: Eddie Huang
- Written by: Eddie Huang
- Produced by: Josh Bratman; Michael Tadross; Josh McLaughlin
- Starring: Taylor Takahashi; Taylour Paige; Pop Smoke; Jorge Lendeborg Jr.
- Cinematography: Brett Jutkiewicz
- Edited by: Joan Sobel
- Music by: Adrian Younge; Ali Shaheed Muhammad; Pop Smoke
- Production company: Immersive Pictures
- Distributed by: Focus Features (United States); Universal Pictures (International)
- Release date: March 5, 2021
- Running time: 89 minutes
- Country: United States
- Language: English
- Box office: $4.2 million

Boogie is a 2021 American sports drama film written and directed by Eddie Huang in his directorial debut. It stars Taylor Takahashi, Taylour Paige, Pop Smoke, and Jorge Lendeborg Jr. The film marks the first and only acting film appearance by Pop Smoke before his death in February 2020. It was released on March 5, 2021, by Focus Features. The film received mixed reviews from critics and has grossed $4.3 million.

== Plot ==
A basketball phenom in Queens, New York, Alfred “Boogie” Chin struggles to balance the pressure from his traditional East Asian parents to earn a scholarship to an elite college over chasing his NBA dreams.

== Cast ==
- Taylor Takahashi as Alfred “Boogie” Chin
- Taylour Paige as Eleanor
- Jorge Lendeborg Jr. as Richie
- Bashar Jackson as Monk
- Pamelyn Chee as Mrs. Chin
- Perry Yung as Mr. Chin
- Mike Moh as Melvin
- Alexa Mareka as Alissa
- Domenick Lombardozzi as Coach Hawkins
- Steve Coulter as Mr. Richmond
- Eddie Huang as Uncle Jackie
- Charlamagne tha God as Patrick

== Production ==
In August 2019, it was announced Taylor Takahashi, Pamelyn Chee, and Jorge Lendeborg Jr. had joined the cast of the film, with Eddie Huang directing from a screenplay he wrote, with Focus Features distributing. In September 2019, Mike Moh, Dave East, Perry Yung, Alexa Mareka, Taylour Paige, and Domenick Lombardozzi joined the cast of the film.

Principal photography began August 2019 in the New York City sections of Queens and Manhattan. Filming lasted 26 days, also taking place in Flushing, New York.

== Release ==
It was released on March 5, 2021.

== Reception ==
=== Box office ===
In the United States and Canada, Boogie made $430,000 from 1,252 theaters on its first day of release. It went on to debut to $1.2 million, finishing fifth at the box office. The film made $730,000 in its second weekend, remaining in fourth place.

=== Critical response ===
Review aggregator Rotten Tomatoes reports an approval rating of 42% based on 81 reviews, with an average rating of 5.5/10. The website's critics consensus reads: "Boogie misses its shot with a contrived plot and uneven tone." According to Metacritic, which sampled 24 critics and calculated a weighted average score of 54 out of 100, the film received "mixed or average" reviews. Audiences polled by CinemaScore gave the film an average grade of "C+" on an A+ to F scale, while PostTrak reported 70% of audience members gave it a positive score, with 55% saying they would definitely recommend it.

Teo Bugbee at The New York Times gave a mixed-to-positive review, writing "It's a competent movie, but it doesn't quite make it to the big leagues". Chris Vognar for the San Francisco Chronicle gave the film a "sitting Little Man", roughly translating to 3/5 stars, stating that it's "refreshing to see the rare Asian American drama on the big screen, but a lot of the conflict in Boogie, on the court and off, feels undercooked." Alison Willmore of Vulture gave a mixed-to-negative review, writing that the film's "ideas about Asian American identity and being Chinese in America are vague" and that "it regards Blackness with a roiling mixture of covetousness and resentment."

Robert Daniels at IndieWire rated the film 'D', stating that "Eddie Huang's coming-of-age sports drama uplifts the Asian American struggle while falling into the same othering it purports to despise".

== See also ==
- List of basketball films
- List of hood films
