= Eddie Huang =

American restaurateur, chef, writer (born 1982)

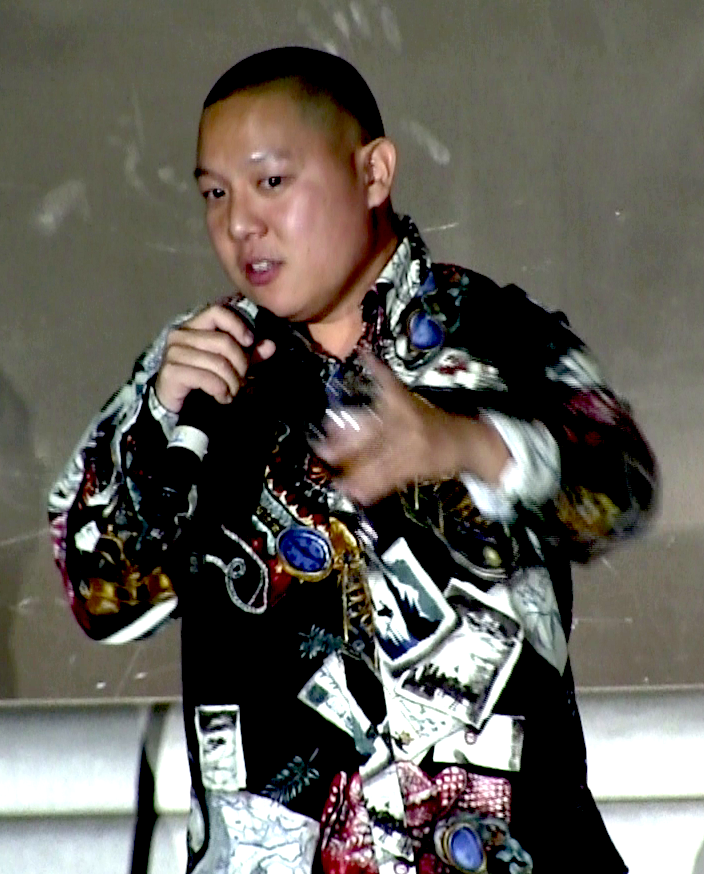
- Huang in 2015
- Born: Edwyn Charles Huang; March 1, 1982 (age 44); Fairfax, Virginia, U.S.
- Education: University of Pittsburgh; Rollins College (BA); Yeshiva University (JD)
- Years active: 2006–present
- Known for: BaoHaus (Manhattan restaurant); Fresh Off the Boat: A Memoir; Fresh Off the Boat; Huang's World
- Spouse: Shia Blanca
- Children: 1

Eddie Huang
- Traditional Chinese: 黃頤銘
- Simplified Chinese: 黄颐铭
Transcriptions
Standard Mandarin
- Hanyu Pinyin: Huáng Yímíng

Edwyn Charles Huang (born March 1, 1982) is an American author, chef, restaurateur, food personality, producer, and former attorney. He was a co-owner of BaoHaus, a gua bao restaurant in the East Village of Lower Manhattan. Huang previously hosted Huang's World for Viceland. His autobiography, Fresh Off the Boat: A Memoir, was adapted into the ABC sitcom Fresh Off the Boat, in which he narrated the whole first season.

== Early life and education ==
Huang was born in Fairfax, Virginia, to Jessica and Louis Huang, who were immigrants from Taiwan. They were both Taiwanese waishengren; the ancestral homes of his father and mother were in the Hunan and Shandong provinces of mainland China, respectively. Huang was raised in Silver Spring, Maryland, a suburb of Washington, D.C., then moved to Orlando, Florida, where his father owned a successful group of steak and seafood restaurants, including Atlantic Bay Seafood and Grill and Cattleman's Ranch Steakhouse. He appreciated African-American culture, especially hip-hop, at a young age. He also frequently got into fights, getting arrested at least twice on assault charges while growing up.

Huang attended Dr. Phillips High School in Orlando. He also went on to attend the University of Pittsburgh and Rollins College, graduating with a B.A. in English and Film from Rollins in 2004. At Rollins, he also won the Barbara Lawrence Alfond English Award and the Zora Neale Hurston Award, and was Sports and Humor editor for the school paper, The Sandspur. In 2008, Huang earned a J.D. from the Benjamin N. Cardozo School of Law at Yeshiva University. At Cardozo, Huang worked at the Innocence Project, served as President of the Minority Law Students Association and as Vice President of the Asian Pacific American Law Students Association, and also won a New York City Bar Association Minority Fellowship in 2006.

== Career ==
After graduating from law school, Huang worked as a corporate attorney at the law firm Chadbourne & Parke in New York City. He worked as a summer associate in 2006 and 2007, then was hired as an associate in the firm's corporate department in 2008. Within a year, due to the 2008 financial crisis, Huang was laid off, and began working as a stand-up comic and marijuana dealer.

=== Clothing designer ===
From 2006 to 2009, Huang ran a streetwear company called "Hoodman Clothing," initially called "Bergdorf Hoodman." At Hoodman, Huang co-created clothing designs with Art Director Ning Juang, a graphic designer whom he had met in Taiwan.

=== Chef and restaurateur ===
Huang was also interested in food as he had grown up watching his mother cook at home. He also learned cooking techniques from various chefs of different cultural backgrounds and cuisine styles that worked at his father's restaurants. He learned management and how to be a good expeditor. Working as an expeditor was a skill he learned from his father. In 2011, Huang was named to the Chow 13, a list of influential people in food presented annually by Chow.com.

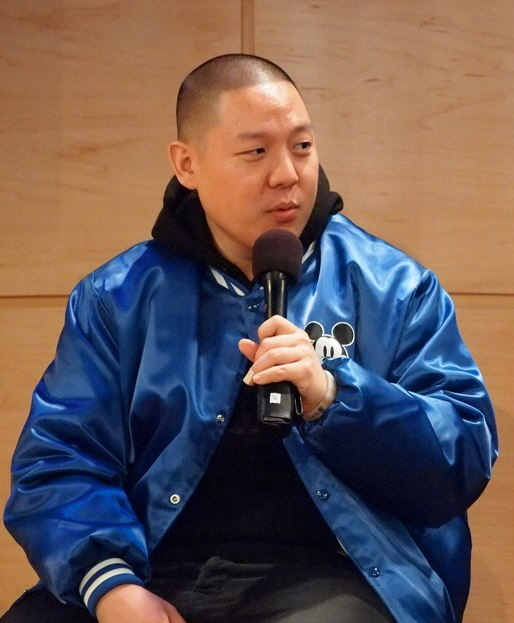
Huang in New York City, January 13, 2013

==== Restaurants ====
In December 2009, Huang opened BaoHaus, a Taiwanese bun (刈包) shop, on the Lower East Side of Manhattan. In July 2011, he relocated his first shop to 238 East 14th Street in the East Village with an expanded menu. In October 2020, Huang announced the permanent closure of BaoHaus. Prior to shutting down, the restaurant had been praised by TimeOut for cheap pricing and unique menu items.

Huang reopened Baohaus in March 2026. The new restaurant is located at 97 St. Mark's Place.

Another restaurant, Xiao Ye, was less successful and closed after poor reviews and controversy over its sales of Four Loko. Sam Sifton, a reviewer for The New York Times, awarded the restaurant zero (out of four) stars, and wrote that "if Mr. Huang spent even a third of the time cooking that he does writing funny blog posts and wry Twitter updates, posting hip-hop videos and responding to Internet friends, rivals, critics and customers, Xiao Ye might be one of the more interesting restaurants to open in New York City in the last few months."

=== Author ===
Huang created the blog called Fresh Off the Boat and later published a memoir with Random House by the same name. Fresh Off the Boat: A Memoir was released in early 2013, receiving favorable reviews from Publishers Weekly and The New York Times.

Double Cup Love: On the Trail of Family, Food, and Broken Hearts in China was published in 2016.

Huang's first novel, Come Undone, was published in 2026.

=== Television ===
Huang hosted Cheap Bites on the Cooking Channel at the end of 2011 and also appeared on several episodes of Unique Eats before leaving the Cooking Channel for Viceland, where he hosted a recurring segment, also called Fresh Off the Boat, which was later developed into an hour-long show and renamed Huang's World. In 2014, Huang was the host of Snack Off on MTV. The show featured Huang, mentoring contestants participating in challenges that determine who can whip up the tastiest treats using random ingredients like fish sticks, canned oysters, chocolate and much more.

==== Fresh Off the Boat ====
In 2014, ABC ordered a television series based on his book, also titled Fresh Off the Boat, starring Randall Park and Constance Wu, with Hudson Yang playing Eddie. The show debuted with two preview episodes on February 4, 2015, and premiered in its prime time slot on February 10, 2015. Huang narrated every episode of the first season, but left the show prior to the second season.

Huang was outspoken in his criticism of the development process of the show, writing a lengthy essay about his concern that his vision for the show was compromised. Huang has said that he doesn't like the show, because he thinks that the storyline after the pilot episode is not what he wrote in his memoir. He has said that he mostly avoids watching it, though he admits there were two exceptions he tuned into: The episode with a DMX cameo in which he appreciated the interactions between DMX and young Eddie, which he talks about in his book, “Double Cup Love”. He also admits tuning for a few minutes to the episode where the family visits Taiwan, but didn't like it.

=== Film ===
In August 2019, it was announced Huang would direct and write Boogie, a coming-of-age movie about a young Chinese-American basketball player's rise to prominence, starring Taylor Takahashi, Pamelyn Chee, Jorge Lendeborg Jr., Mike Moh, Dave East, Pop Smoke, Perry Yung, Alexa Mareka and Taylour Paige, with Focus Features distributing. Huang wrote the screenplay in five days with no plan or outline, incorporating the themes that have defined his life such as basketball, feeling adrift in a country where he has always been in a minority, and domestic abuse. He directed the 2025 documentary Vice is Broke.

== Works and publications ==
- Huang, Eddie. Fresh Off the Boat: A Memoir. New York: Spiegel & Grau, 2013; ISBN 978-0-679-64488-0
- Huang, Eddie. Double Cup Love: On the Trail of Family, Food, and Broken Hearts in China. New York : Spiegel & Grau, [2016]
- Huang's World (Viceland) 2016
- Vice Is Broke (MUBI) 2024
- Huang, Eddie. Come Undone. New York: One World; ISBN 978-0399591907

== See also ==
- Chinese people in New York City
- New Yorkers in journalism
- Taiwanese people in New York City
