= A. Magazine =

Asian American magazine

A. Magazine was an Asian American–focused magazine published by A.Media, Inc., and headquartered in midtown Manhattan with offices in Los Angeles and San Francisco. Geared towards a young audience, its mission was to "report on the developments, address the issues, and celebrate the achievements of this [Asian] dynamic new population."

It was created in 1989 by Jeff Yang, Amy Chu, Sandi Kim and Bill Yao to cover East Asian American issues and culture, and often featured fashion spreads, advice columns, horoscopes, and news stories. A. Magazine grew out of a campus magazine edited by Yang while an undergraduate at Harvard University. Though well-known and influential in the East Asian American community, it was not profitable in its thirteen-year existence.

The magazine operated for twelve years though it reached a circulation high of 200,000. When the economy declined in 2001, the magazine declined. When it ceased on February 20, 2002, it was the largest English-language publication for Asian Americans in the United States, with bi-monthly readership exceeding 200,000 in North America.

In November 1999, A. Magazine obtained $4.5 million in venture capital funding, and the company was renamed aMedia, reflecting a branching out into Web publishing. In early 2000, after announcing their expansion into a 20,000-square-foot (1,900 m^{2}) office in San Francisco, the U.S. economy entered into a downturn. In an attempt to recover, the company merged with Click2Asia in November 2000. After a shareholder fight, the merged company closed in 2002.

== Books ==
- Yang, Jeff; Gan, Dina; Hong, Terry (1997). Eastern Standard Time: A Guide to Asian Influence on American Culture from Astro Boy to Zen Buddhism. Boston: Mariner Books; Houghton Mifflin. ISBN 0-395-76341-X. OCLC 37022942.

== See also ==
- Yolk magazine
