= Fresh Off the Boat: A Memoir =

2013 autobiography by Eddie Huang

- Author: Eddie Huang
- Language: English
- Genre: Memoir
- Publisher: Spiegel & Grau
- Publication place: United States
- Pages: 276
- ISBN: 978-0812988536
- OCLC: 794359075

Fresh Off the Boat: A Memoir is an autobiography by American food personality Eddie Huang. It was published in 2013 by Spiegel & Grau, an imprint of Random House. The book relates Huang's early life and rise in the food celebrity scene in New York City, and his relationship with his Asian American background.

== Background ==
Huang, an attorney, became prominent in New York's restaurant scene after the success of BaoHaus, his purveyor of Taiwanese-braised pork belly buns, also known as gua-bao (刈包). He developed a reputation as a food personality after hosting food-themed programs on the Food Network and Vice TV. The memoir is Huang's first published work; his previous writing experience was mostly limited to his popular blog, which covers both food and topical issues. The book shares its title with Huang's blog and his Vice online video program, and refers to Huang's Taiwanese immigrant background. Huang stated in an interview with Publishers Weekly that expressing the experience of being an "other" in America was a major impetus for writing the book. He has mentioned Mark Twain, Jonathan Swift and hip hop as inspirations for his writing.

== Content ==
The memoir relates Huang's childhood, spent first in Washington, D.C., and later in Orlando, Florida. Huang, one of three sons of Taiwanese immigrants, struggled with his identity growing up. Hip hop and African American culture provided a sympathetic counterpoint to the racism and exclusion he experienced at school. Huang was exposed to cooking through his parents; his mother prepared traditional Taiwanese dishes at home, and he learned American regional cuisines through cooking at his father's Orlando restaurants.

Huang writes about his college days, his short careers as a lawyer and as a stand-up comic, and various forays into illicit commerce. Success came with the opening of BaoHaus, but there were failures, also - his restaurant Xiao Ye was closed after being seriously panned by critics. In the book, Huang discusses Taiwanese cuisine and his relationship with Asian cooking in general.

== Reception ==
Literary critic Dwight Garner, reviewing in The New York Times, commented on Huang's "bluster" and rude language, but appreciated the author's humor and observations on American culture. Garner called the book "a surprisingly sophisticated memoir about race and assimilation in America" and a "rowdy...counterpoint" to other memoirs dealing with the immigrant experience. The book received a "starred" review from Publishers Weekly. Kirkus Reviews called Huang a "unique voice with a provocative point of view." The book received praise from celebrity chef Anthony Bourdain, who called it "[m]ercilessly funny and provocative".

== Television adaptation ==
Huang's memoir was adapted by Nahnatchka Khan for an ABC single-camera comedy series of the same name. Huang's mother is played by Constance Wu, with Randall Park playing the role of his father. Huang is played by newcomer Hudson Yang.

== See also ==
- Chinese Americans in New York City
- Taiwanese American
