= Fresh Off the Boat =

American television sitcom (2015–2020)

- Genre: Sitcom
- Created by: Nahnatchka Khan
- Based on: Fresh Off the Boat by Eddie Huang
- Starring: Randall Park; Constance Wu; Hudson Yang; Forrest Wheeler; Ian Chen; Lucille Soong; Chelsey Crisp; Ray Wise
- Narrated by: Eddie Huang
- Opening theme: "Fresh off the Boat" by Danny Brown
- Composer: Bo Boddie
- Country of origin: United States
- Original languages: English; Mandarin
- No. of seasons: 6
- No. of episodes: 116 (list of episodes)

Production
- Executive producers: Jake Kasdan; Nahnatchka Khan; Melvin Mar; Keith Heisler; Matt Kuhn; Laura McCreary; Randall Park (season 3–6)
- Producers: Rich Blomquist; Eddie Huang; Justin McEwen; Randall Park (season 1–2); Constance Wu (season 5–6)
- Production locations: Los Angeles, California
- Camera setup: Single-camera
- Running time: 22 minutes
- Production companies: Fierce Baby Productions; The Detective Agency; 20th Century Fox Television

Original release
- Network: ABC
- Release: February 4, 2015 – February 21, 2020

Fresh Off the Boat is an American television sitcom created by Nahnatchka Khan and produced by 20th Century Fox Television for ABC. It is loosely inspired by the life of chef and food personality Eddie Huang and his 2013 autobiography of the same name. Huang was the executive producer of the series, and narrated its first season. Depicting the life of a Taiwanese-American family in Florida in the 1990s, the series stars Randall Park, Constance Wu, Hudson Yang, Forrest Wheeler, Ian Chen, and Lucille Soong as the Huang family as well as Chelsey Crisp and Ray Wise portraying the family's next-door neighbors.

The first two episodes of the series were premiered on ABC in February 2015 to positive critical reception, with it becoming the first network television sitcom in the U.S. to feature a family of Asian Americans as main characters in over 20 years. Prior to its second season, the series went through a retooling, which included Huang's departure as narrator. It received accolades as well as nominations for major awards, such as Critics' Choice Television Award and NAACP Image Award nominations. After becoming the first series featuring an all-Asian American main cast to broadcast over 100 episodes, the series was concluded on February 21, 2020, after six seasons.

== Series synopsis ==
Set during the 1990s, the series revolves around the Huangs, a Taiwanese-American family comprising parents Louis and Jessica, their children Eddie, Emery, and Evan, and Louis's mother, Jenny, following their relocation from Chinatown of Washington, D.C. to Orlando, Florida to open a cowboy-themed steakhouse. Season two chronicles the burgeoning success of the family-owned restaurant, named Cattleman's Ranch, Jessica's partnership with the Huangs' neighbor Honey on a business venture, and Eddie's troublemaking tendencies as well as his relationship with his mother. The third season sees the Huang family continue to assimilate into their community, with Jessica obtaining her U.S. citizenship and deciding how she wants to parent her sons, each of the Huang children continuing their schooling, and Louis contemplating selling the steakhouse.

The fourth season follows Jessica as she pens her novel titled A Case of a Knife to the Brain and Eddie as he enters freshman year while also supporting his friend and neighbor Nicole after she comes out as gay, while the fifth sees Jessica's unsuccessful novel release and the events that follow; the pregnancy of Honey, the Huangs' neighbor and Jessica's best friend; and Eddie entering a cultural exchange program to visit Taiwan. The final season follows Jessica becoming an educator, Louis becoming a business consultant, Evan undergoing puberty, Emery taking up acting, and Eddie contemplating his future as he approaches the end of his high school years.

== Cast and characters ==
- Randall Park as Louis Huang, the father of Eddie, Emery, and Evan, and husband of Jessica. He is nice and mild-mannered and embraces all things American, which is often seen when he recounts his younger days. He owns a Western steakhouse restaurant in Orlando named Cattleman's Ranch.
- Constance Wu as Jessica Huang, the wife of Louis and mother of Eddie, Emery, and Evan. She is a no-nonsense, pragmatic, and highly competitive woman who believes in tough love. She often pushes her sons and husband to pursue more success and keep in touch with their Taiwanese heritage.
- Hudson Yang as Edwyn "Eddie" Huang, a die-hard fan of hip-hop as well as a big fan of basketball. He is initially the main protagonist of the series before the creative shift to focus on the entire family in season 2. The show follows his journey from his childhood years to his senior year of high school. The oldest of three brothers, he eschews Taiwanese culture and behaves more rebelliously than his younger siblings, which makes him a frequent target of Jessica's complaints. While working at Louis's restaurant, he displays strong customer service and marketing skills. He later reveals a desire to attend culinary school instead of a traditional college. The real-life Huang serves as an executive producer of the series throughout its run as well as its narrator during the first season.
- Forrest Wheeler as Emery Huang, the middle son of the Huang family. He is a romantic, sweet, and charismatic kid. Mature for his age, he is a "ladies' man". He is good at academics as well as athletics, as he thrives in a tennis tournament and plays as part of the school volleyball team in season five. He graduates elementary school at the end of season two and begins high school in season six, during which he becomes interested in acting.
- Ian Chen as Evan Huang, Louis and Jessica's youngest son. A star student and obeyer of rules, he attends his neighborhood's homeowner association meetings. He makes Jessica the proudest, as she frequently predicts his future dual career as "doctor/president". Evan skips fifth grade between seasons three and four and starts middle school in the fourth season.
- Lucille Soong as Jenny Huang (main season 2–6, recurring season 1), mother of Louis and grandmother of Eddie, Evan, and Emery. Although she understands English, she initially only speaks in Mandarin (subtitled in English). She rarely interacts with the family's affairs, usually just sitting back and making sarcastic comments for her own amusement. In season four, the family discovers she has secretly been taking ESL lessons, and she speaks English for the first time. She is a fan of the comic Garfield.
- Chelsey Crisp as Honey Ellis (main seasons 2–6, recurring season 1), the Huangs' next-door neighbor and Marvin's third wife. As Jessica's best friend, she often witnesses Jessica's competitive nature, which intimidates her. She births a daughter in the season five premiere and welcomes a second child later in the season.
- Ray Wise as Marvin Ellis (main seasons 3–6, recurring seasons 1–2), the Huangs' next-door neighbor and Honey's much-older husband. He is a successful dentist who married Honey after his previous wife caught him cheating with Honey on the kitchen floor. He is good friends with the Huang family, especially Louis.

== Production ==
=== Development and casting ===
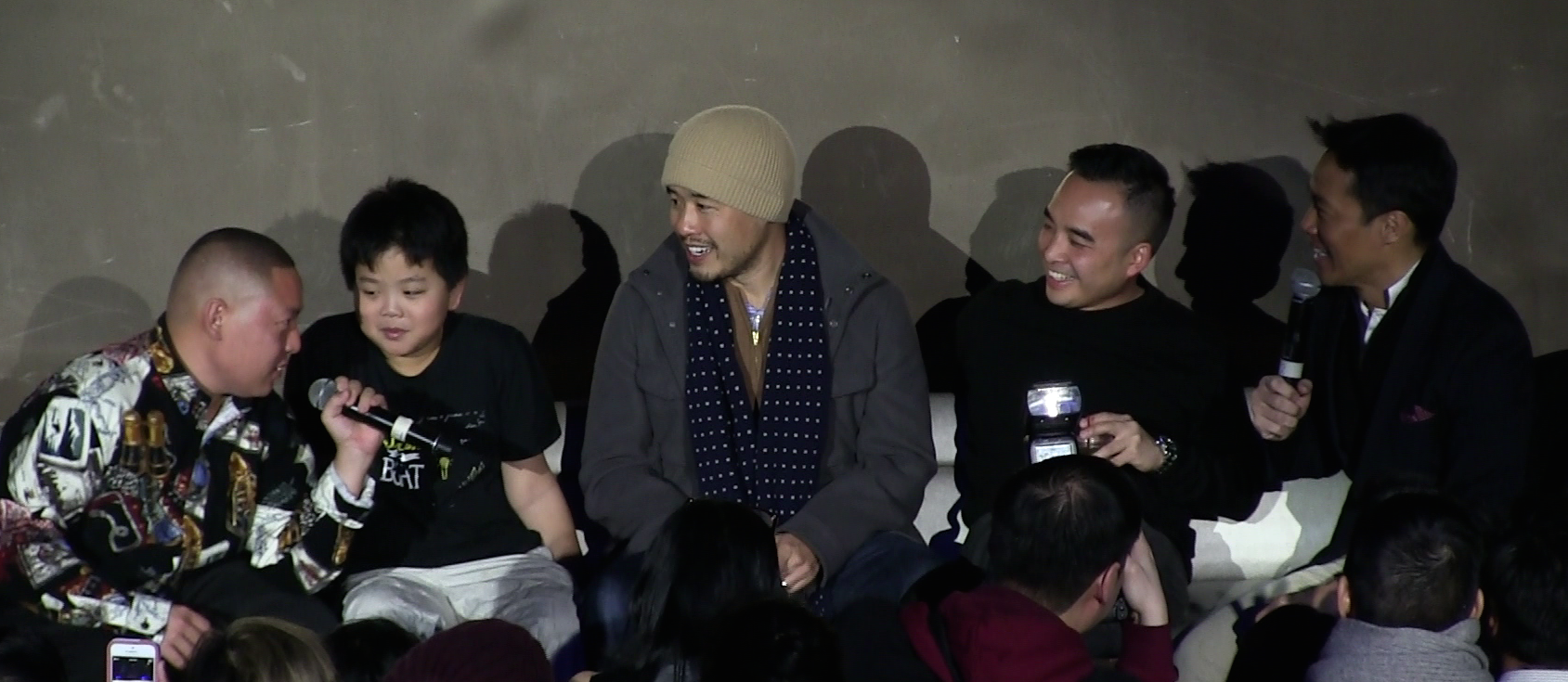
The Fresh Off the Boat cast at a panel discussion for the show, the day after the series premiere

Eddie Huang's 2013 autobiography, Fresh Off the Boat, caught the attention of television networks upon its release, with ABC and 20th Century Fox Television ordering a pilot episode for a series based on the memoir in August. Writer Nahnatchka Khan, who was known as the creator and executive producer of fellow ABC sitcom Don't Trust the B— in Apartment 23, was hired to write and executive produce the pilot, while Huang himself was brought on as an executive producer. In February 2014, Constance Wu and Randall Park were the first two actors announced to star in the series as its leads. A month later, it was announced that Hudson Yang would be portraying Huang in the series.

After the series was titled Far East Orlando during its development stage, Huang led a Twitter campaign to change the title to that of his autobiography. Regarding the title change, Khan stated that "going the 'unsafe' route and picking a title that announces itself and doesn't apologize made sense." In May 2014, ABC announced a full season order of the series during the May 2014 upfront to air in 2015 as a mid-season replacement.

With its premiere on February 4, 2015, Fresh Off the Boat became the first American television sitcom starring an Asian American family to air on network primetime since Margaret Cho's All-American Girl, which aired for one season in 1994. Khan stated that even though she herself was not Chinese, she was not worried about inauthenticity because she was "focused on character and comedy and story". Regarding balancing the representation of the Asian American experience versus the specificity of the characterization of the Huang family, Wu stated: "Specificity is what makes good storytelling, and good storytelling is what makes money, and making money is then what encourages new producers to invest in different stories about Asians." In a 2015 interview, Wu further stated that after the first season, she had become more comfortable asking the show's staff to change particular details, for example changing "generic Asian food [in a scene] ... to a 1,000-year-old black egg with tofu and scallions, [which] will be a little more specific, and specificity is just better for character, and it's more interesting than, say, tofu and rice." The series also regularly features dialogues in Mandarin.

Khan stepped down as the series' showrunner in 2019 while remaining a consulting producer for the rest of the series; she was replaced by producers Keith Hesler and Matt Kuhn. Regarding directing, recurring directors throughout the series include Lynn Shelton, who directed the pilot and went on to direct a total of nine episodes, Claire Scanlon, Anya Adams, and Gail Mancuso. Park made his directorial debut as the director of the final episode of the series.

=== Filming ===
While it is set in Orlando, Florida, Fresh Off the Boat was mainly filmed in Stage 14, located at 20th Century Fox in Century City in Los Angeles. During the production of the third season, the series conducted filming in Taipei, Taiwan for three days. Filming for the series had concluded as of January 2020.

=== Retooling ===
After Fresh Off the Boat's first season, Eddie Huang reduced his involvement with the series, including no longer being the narrator, due to creative differences with ABC, as well as time constraints with other projects. He remains credited as a producer, and the show's credits continued to note that the series is based on his memoir. With Huang's departure, ABC decided not to recast the narrator role, dropping it from the series altogether.

The series also experienced a change regarding its character focus, which was broadened to encompass the entire Huang family, namely Louis and Jessica, rather than on Eddie only. Additionally, recurring cast members Lucille Soong and Chelsey Crisp were both promoted to the main cast, while Ray Wise became a series regular beginning in season three.

=== Renewals ===
On May 7, 2015, ABC renewed Fresh off the Boat for a second season of 13 episodes. ABC ordered 9 additional episodes on October 13 and two more on November 17, leading to a total of 24 episodes for the second season. On March 3, 2016, ABC announced that the series has been renewed for a third season, which premiered on October 11, 2016. On May 12, 2017, ABC renewed the series for a fourth season, which premiered on October 3, 2017. On May 11, 2018, ABC renewed the series for a fifth season, which premiered on October 5. On May 10, 2019, ABC renewed the series for a sixth season. The sixth season premiered on September 27, 2019. On November 8, 2019, ABC announced that the series was to end following the conclusion of its sixth season. The season contained 15 episodes, with the two-part series finale airing on February 21, 2020.

== Wu's posts and harassment claims ==
Wu received backlash after she posted profane tweets about the sixth-season renewal in May 2019. Following the tweets, Karey Burke, President of ABC Entertainment Group, stated that there were no plans to recast the role of Jessica. Wu publicly apologized, stating that the series' renewal forced her to decline a role in a project she was passionate about, as scheduling would not permit her to do both. She further clarified that she loved her castmates and that her posts had nothing to do with animosity towards them. In 2022, Wu said that she had experienced sexual harassment, intimidation, and threats by a producer during the first two seasons of the series. She related the experience to her complaints about the series receiving a sixth season.

== Episodes ==
Season	Episodes	Originally released	
Season	Episodes	First released	Last released
1	13	February 4, 2015	April 21, 2015
2	24	September 22, 2015	May 24, 2016
3	23	October 11, 2016	May 16, 2017
4	19	October 3, 2017	March 20, 2018
5	22	October 5, 2018	April 12, 2019
6	15	September 27, 2019	February 21, 2020

== Distribution ==
=== Broadcast ===
On November 8, 2014, the premiere of the pilot episode was hosted by the San Diego Asian Film Festival. The show debuted on ABC with two preview episodes on February 4, 2015. The second episode, which aired after Modern Family, was promoted as a bonus episode, and formally premiered in its primetime slot on February 10, 2015. The first of the two preview episodes garnered 7.94 million viewers, becoming the second-highest rated comedy premiere that season.

Fresh Off the Boat premiered on FOX8 in Australia on May 10, 2015; It was also picked up by Network Ten, and started airing on March 7, 2016, on its sister channel, Eleven until October 2017. It debuted on March 12, 2015, in South Africa on Fox Crime. In South Asia, Fresh Off The Boat, airs 12 hours after the U.S. broadcast on Star World Premiere HD. In the UK, the first season originally premiered on Amazon Video on February 4, 2015. The second season premiered on September 22, 2015. On November 1, 2017 Fresh Off the Boat received its television premiere on Channel 5's sister channel 5Star starting with the pilot episode. In Israel, it is broadcast by satellite provider yes.

On July 23, 2018, it was announced that American cable networks Freeform and Up TV have licensed the cable syndication rights to the first five seasons of the series. In April 2019, the series aired its 100th episode, effectively becoming the first series featuring an all Asian American cast to reach the milestone. As of November of the same year, the series is the longest-running Asian American family sitcom in television history.

=== Home media ===
On September 29, 2015, the first season of Fresh Off the Boat was released on DVD. The DVD contains two discs with all 13 episodes of season-one and special features such as a gag reel, as well a "Fresh Facts Trivia Track". The second and third seasons of Fresh Off the Boat were simultaneously released on DVD on May 22, 2018, while the fourth season was released on June 12, 2018. On September 3, 2019, the fifth season of the series was released on DVD.

== Reception ==
=== Critical response ===
Fresh Off the Boat received positive reviews. The series holds a 94% approval rating on the review aggregator website Rotten Tomatoes, with the site's critical consensus of the first season reading: "Once the cliched gags of Fresh off the Boat are superseded by a grounded truthfulness, the series evolves into a humorously charming family sitcom." It has a score of 75 out of 100, based on 28 critics, on Metacritic, indicating "generally favorable reviews".

In a positive review, Lenika Cruz of The Atlantic praised the series' ability to "deliver consistent chuckles and cleverly subvert stereotypes of Asian American experience—even if they come wrapped in a fairly standard family-sitcom package", while TheWrap's Mekeisha Madden Toby remarked that the series "has soul, flavor and an incredible cast." In concurrence, Robert Lloyd of The Los Angeles Times commended the series as "a consistently funny and even important one, with some lovely, nuanced performances". The series' style attracted comparisons to other television sitcoms, such as Everybody Hates Chris for both series' usage of "'at the end of the day, we do all really love one another, even if we sometimes make each other crazy' conclusions" as well as fellow ABC sitcoms Black-ish for how both series are "effectively studied in talking about and spoofing race" and The Goldbergs in their "fun-for-the-whole-family feel-good comedy style".

Critics noted the series' role in increasing the visibility and accuracy of Asian Americans in arts and entertainment. Antonia Chan of the Harvard Political Review commented that "Fresh Off the Boat captures the essence of why diversity in media matters", while Ester Suh, writing for the Huffington Post, stated that the sitcom had caused "real conversations being had about Asian American identity in addition to acknowledging the lack of inclusivity Asian Americans have had in the nation's cultural and entertainment dialogue". Brian Moylan of The Guardian further opined that the series "offers an Asian perspective on race relations – something we rarely see in pop culture."

Constance Wu's portrayal of Jessica Huang garnered praise. Tim Goodman of The Hollywood Reporter complimented Wu's portrayal of "hysterically harsh strictness" and how it was "delivered with an impressive range that covers the blatantly angry, the dubiously befuddled, the disapproving but supportive and the flat-out odd"; moreover, Entertainment Weekly's Ray Rahman stated: "Every line, every expression, every under-her-breath swipe [Wu] delivers hits its mark." On February 14, 2015, TVLine named Wu the site's performer of the week based on her performance in the third episode of the first season, while James Poniewozik of Time magazine and Brian Lowry of Variety highlighted Wu's performance as the series' breakout.

In terms of how the series fares in comparison to Huang's memoir, Sam Adams of IndieWire positively stated that the former was "sharp enough about race and culture to be daring, yet safe enough that no one is likely to feel excluded". David Hinckley of the New York Daily News felt that the series "takes the edges off some of Huang's more somber reflections on America and assimilation." Conversely, in her review for The New Yorker, television critic Emily Nussbaum negatively compared the portrayal of Eddie Huang's relationship with his father to that in the memoir, stating: "Without a cruel bully for a father, Eddie's taste for hip-hop feels more superficial—in the book, it's an abused kid's catharsis and an identification with black history." Neil Genzlinger of The New York Times criticized the series' avoidance of the memoir's "edge", which was its "brash" quality.

=== Eddie Huang's response ===
Throughout the first season, Eddie Huang (not the character in the show) expressed frustration over ABC's treatment of the series, saying that it presents "an ambiguous, cornstarch story about Asian-Americans" that perpetuates "an artificial representation of Asian American lives," opining that the sitcom was adapted to suit a broader American audience. He also tweeted in April 2015, "I understand this is a comedy but the great comics speak from pain: Pryor, Rock, Louis...This show had that opportunity but it fails." Despite this, Huang deems the series a milestone for Asian American representation. He further explained in an interview on National Public Radio, "The studio and network are not on a mission to not represent us. They just don't know how to." In a 2016 interview with Constance Wu, regarding whether he watched the series, Huang stated: "I don't watch it, but I'm proud of what it does."

=== Ratings ===
Season	Timeslot (ET)	No. of episodes	Premiered		Ended		TV season	Rank	Viewers (in millions)
Season	Timeslot (ET)	No. of episodes	Date	Premiere viewers (in millions)	Date	Finale viewers (in millions)	TV season	Rank	Viewers (in millions)
1	Tuesday 8:00 pm	13	February 4, 2015	7.94	April 21, 2015	5.08	2014–15	78	6.99
2	Tuesday 8:30 pm (2015); Tuesday 8:00 pm (2016)	24	September 22, 2015	6.05	May 24, 2016	4.88	2015–16	86	5.48
3	Tuesday 9:00 pm	23	October 11, 2016	5.03	May 16, 2017	3.55	2016–17	95	4.66
4	Tuesday 8:30 pm	19	October 3, 2017	4.51	March 20, 2018	3.61	2017–18	108	4.57
5	Friday 8:00 pm	22	October 5, 2018	2.85	April 12, 2019	3.08	2018–19	121	3.80
6	Friday 8:30 pm	15	September 27, 2019	2.34	February 21, 2020	2.39	2019–20	100	3.12

=== Awards and nominations ===
Year	Award	Category	Nominee	Result	Ref.
2015	Critics' Choice Television Awards	Best Actress in a Comedy Series	Constance Wu	Nominated	
2015	TCA Awards	Individual Achievement in Comedy	Constance Wu	Nominated	
2015	Poppy Awards	Best Actress in a Comedy Series	Constance Wu	Nominated	
2015	Gold Derby TV Awards	Best Comedy Actress	Constance Wu	Nominated	
2016	Critics' Choice Television Awards	Best Actor in a Comedy Series	Randall Park	Nominated	
2016	Critics' Choice Television Awards	Best Actress in a Comedy Series	Constance Wu	Nominated	
2016	NAACP Image Awards	Outstanding Performance by a Youth (Series, Special, Television Movie or Mini-series)	Hudson Yang	Nominated	
2016	Young Artist Awards	Outstanding Young Ensemble Cast In A TV Series	Hudson Yang, Forrest Wheeler, Ian Chen	Won	
2016	Young Artist Awards	Best Performance in a TV Series – Supporting Young Actor	Ian Chen	Nominated	
2016	Young Artist Awards	Best Performance in a TV Series – Recurring Young Actress (14–21)	Luna Blaise	Won	
2016	Young Artist Awards	Best Performance in a TV Series – Guest Starring Young Actress (11–13)	Laura Krystine	Nominated	
2016	Young Entertainer Awards	Best Young Ensemble Cast – TV Series	Hudson Yang, Forrest Wheeler, Ian Chen	Won	
2016	Young Entertainer Awards	Best Recurring Young Actor 13 and Under – Television Series	Trevor Larcom	Nominated	
2016	Young Entertainer Awards	Best Recurring Young Actress 13 to 15 – Television Series	Luna Blaise	Nominated	
2016	Young Entertainer Awards	Best Recurring Young Actress 12 and Under – Television Series	Isabella Alexander	Won	
2016	Young Entertainer Awards	Best Guest Starring Young Actor 11 and Under – Television Series	Cole Sand	Nominated	
2016	Teen Choice Awards	Choice TV: Scene Stealer	Hudson Yang	Nominated	
2016	TCA Awards	Individual Achievement in Comedy	Constance Wu	Nominated	
2016	Gold Derby TV Awards	Best Actress in a Comedy Series	Constance Wu	Nominated	
2016	Critics' Choice Television Awards	Best Actress in a Comedy Series	Constance Wu	Nominated	
2017	NAACP Image Awards	Outstanding Performance by a Youth (Series, Special, Television Movie or Mini-series)	Hudson Yang	Nominated	
2017	Young Artist Awards	Best Performance in a TV Series – Leading Young Actor	Ian Chen	Nominated	
2017	Young Artist Awards	Best Performance in a TV Series – Leading Young Actor	Forrest Wheeler	Nominated	
2017	Young Artist Awards	Best Performance in a TV Series – Leading Teen Actor	Hudson Yang	Won	
2017	Young Artist Awards	Best Performance in a TV Series – Recurring Teen Actor	Trevor Larcom	Won	
2017	MTV Movie & TV Awards	Best American Story	Fresh Off the Boat	Nominated	
2017	Critics' Choice Television Awards	Best Actor in a Comedy Series	Randall Park	Nominated	
2017	Critics' Choice Television Awards	Best Actress in a Comedy Series	Constance Wu	Nominated	

== Potential spinoff ==
On June 17, 2020, ABC Entertainment president Karey Burke talked about the potential for a spin-off of Fresh Off the Boat, saying that the spin-off was not likely going to happen. The spin-off would have been titled "Magic Motor Inn" and would have starred Preity Zinta and Vir Das, who appeared in the episode "The Magic Motor Inn" during the show's final season.
