= Jesse Pearson (writer) =

American editor and writer (born 20th century)

- Born: 20th century
- Occupation: Magazine editor

Jesse Pearson (born 20th century) is an American editor and writer.

He was the editor-in-chief of Vice magazine, which is based in New York City, from October 2002 until December 2010.

Pearson has interviewed notable figures, including David Lynch, Marina Abramović, Bret Easton Ellis, David Simon and Johnny Knoxville.

== See also ==
- List of American writers
- List of people from New York City
