= Darrin Henson =

American choreographer, dancer and actor

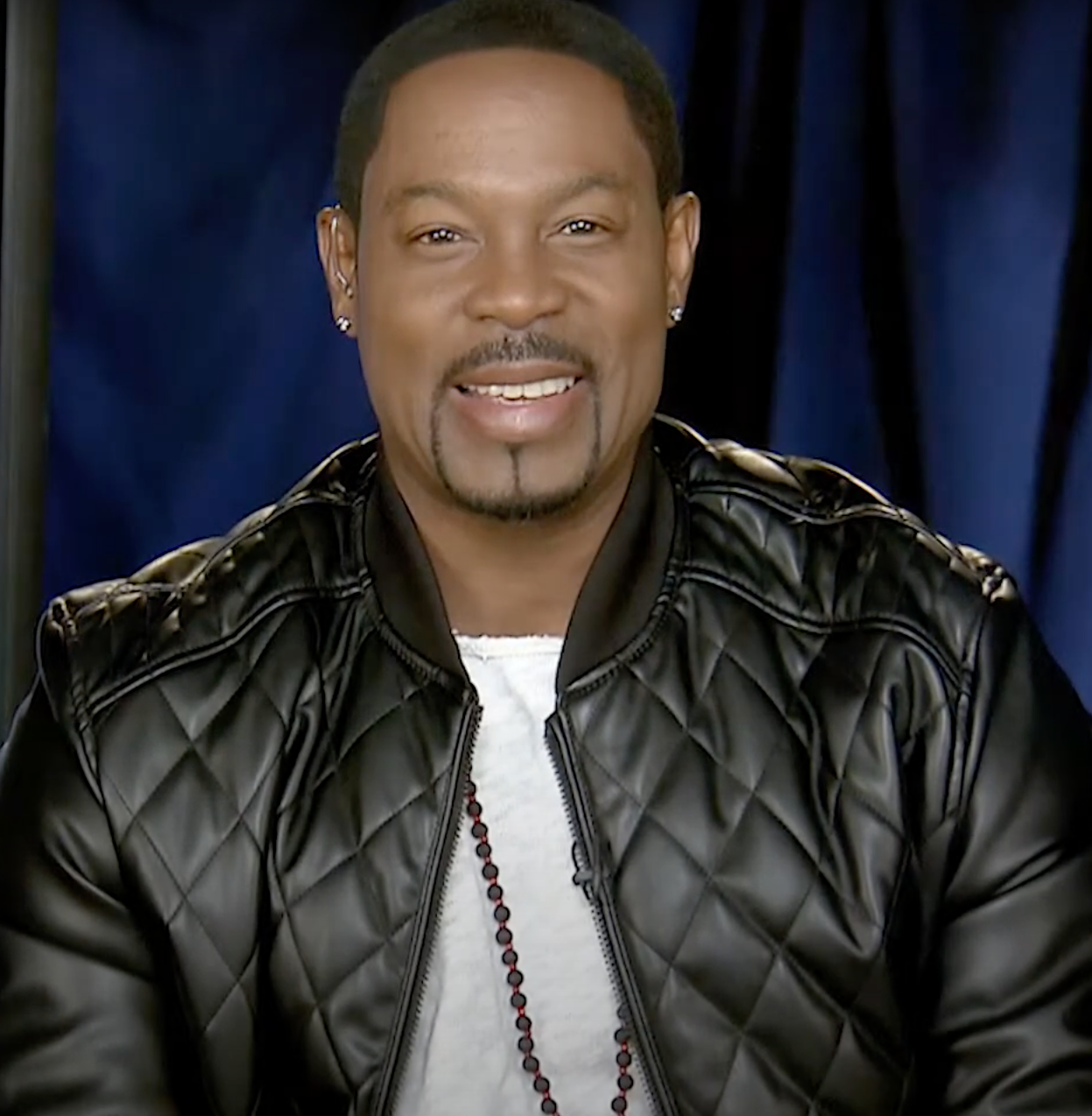
- Henson at the Valder Beebe Show in 2019
- Born: Darrin Dewitt Henson; May 5, 1972 (age 54); The Bronx, New York, U.S.
- Occupations: Choreographer; dancer; actor; director; producer
- Years active: 1990–present
- Children: 4

Darrin Dewitt Henson (born May 5, 1972) is an American choreographer, dancer, actor, and producer. Hensen was a brief member of freestyle music 1980s group Trilogy and was featured on their single "Good Time". He worked as a choreographer for various artists and received the 2000 MTV Video Music Award for Best Choreography for "Bye Bye Bye" by NSYNC.

Henson made his acting debut starring as Lem Van Adams in the Showtime drama series, Soul Food (2000–2004), for which he received two NAACP Image Awards nominations. He later appeared in films The Salon (2005), Stomp the Yard (2007), The Express: The Ernie Davis Story (2008), Tekken (2009), Black Coffee (2014), and Chocolate City (2015). In 2018 he began starring as Orlando Duncan in the BET+ crime drama series, The Family Business.

== Life and career ==
Henson was born in The Bronx, New York. He attended Prep for Prep, a non-profit organization whose vision is to prepare New York City's top minority students for success in education and in life. Hensen was a brief member of freestyle music 1980s group Trilogy and was featured on their single "Good Time". He has choreographed music videos and concerts for such popular music artists as New Kids on the Block, Jordan Knight, Britney Spears, Backstreet Boys, Hi-Five, 98 Degrees, NSYNC and The Spice Girls. He is the winner of the 2000 MTV Video Music Award for Best Choreography for "Bye Bye Bye" by NSYNC. Henson is also known for his instructional dance video Darrin's Dance Grooves (which was heavily marketed in 2001 and 2002),

As an actor, Henson made his Broadway debut appearing in Ron Link's playStand-up Tragedy in 1990, and later performed in off-Broadway of David E. Talbert's play Fabric of a Man. He made his television debut appearing as a dancer in the 1999 made-for-television drama film Double Platinum starring Diana Ross and Brandy. In 2000 he was cast as Lem Van Adams, one of leading characters in the Showtime drama series, Soul Food, the longest-running drama at that time with a predominantly African-American cast in television history. Henson was twice nominated for the NAACP Image Award for Outstanding Supporting Actor in a Drama Series, in 2004 and 2005, for his portrayal as the struggling young husband and father in this series. The series ended in 2004.

After Soul Food, Henson moved to film, starring alongside Vivica A. Fox in the 2005 comedy-drama The Salon. In 2007 he appeared opposite Queen Latifah in the drama film Life Support, which premiered at the 2007 Sundance Film Festival, and starred in the dance drama Stomp the Yard. The film received mixed reviews from critics but grossed $75 million worldwide. In 2008, Henson played football player Jim Brown in the sports film, The Express: The Ernie Davis Story. In 2009 he starred in the science fiction box-office bomb Tekken. Henson later co-starred in films Blood Done Sign My Name (2010), The Inheritance (2011), and The Last Fall (2012). In 2011, Henson starred in the Gospel Music Channel's debut of John Ruffin's stage play The Ideal Husband, which also stars Jackée Harry, Ginuwine, Clifton Powell, Shirley Murdock, Shanti Lowry and Erica Hubbard. He later guest-starred in Single Ladies and Being Mary Jane and was featured in rapper Cuban Link's music video for his song "Dancin' & Groovin'" which was filmed in the South Bronx and released in May that same year.

In 2014, Henson played the leading role in the romantic comedy film, Black Coffee. In 2015 he starred in the comedy-drama film Chocolate City. He later reprised his role in its sequels, Chocolate City: Vegas Strip (2017) and Chocolate City 3: Live Tour (2021). He also appeared in other films in later years, notable South African romantic comedy Zulu Wedding (2019), for which he received nomination for an Africa Movie Academy Award for Best Actor in a Leading Role at the 16th Africa Movie Academy Awards. In 2018, Henson began starring in the BET crime drama series, The Family Business playing the role of Orlando Duncan. He was also interviewed by director Maria Soccor for the documentary Freestyle Music: The Legacy in 2022.

== Filmography ==
=== Film ===
| Year | Title | Role | Note |
|---|---|---|---|
| 2001 | Longshot | Male Flight Attend | |
| 2005 | The Salon | Michael | |
| 2005 | The Fabric of a Man | Joshua King | |
| 2006 | The Last Stand | TD | |
| 2007 | Stomp the Yard | Grant | |
| 2007 | April Fools | Detective Ward | |
| 2008 | The Hustle | Brother Efrom | |
| 2008 | A Good Man Is Hard to Find | Clarence | |
| 2008 | The Express: The Ernie Davis Story | Jim Brown | |
| 2009 | Tekken | Raven | |
| 2010 | Blood Done Sign My Name | Eddie McCoy | |
| 2010 | Kiss the Bride | Thomas | |
| 2011 | The Inheritance | Tyrone | |
| 2012 | The Marriage Chronicles | David Jones | |
| 2012 | The Last Fall | Rell Lee | |
| 2012 | The Great Divide | Randy | |
| 2013 | The Hotel | Devin | Short film |
| 2013 | Four of Hearts | Derrick | Also producer |
| 2013 | The Last Letter | Doctor Jacobs | |
| 2013 | Frat Brothers | Quincy Cooper | Also executive producer |
| 2014 | Black Coffee | Robert | |
| 2014 | After | Andy | |
| 2015 | Ex-Free | Robert | |
| 2015 | Chocolate City | Magnus | |
| 2015 | What Love Will Make You Do | Trey Boston | Also producer |
| 2015 | A Christmas to Remember | Michael | |
| 2015 | Sons 2 the Grave | Detective David Reynolds | |
| 2016 | Silent Cry Aloud | Lemar | |
| 2016 | Pee-Wee's Big Holiday | Police Officer | |
| 2016 | Bad Girl | Pastor Charles Robinson | |
| 2017 | Zulu Wedding | Tex Wilson | Nominated — Africa Movie Academy Award for Best Actor in a Leading Role |
| 2017 | Chocolate City: Vegas Strip | Magnus | |
| 2017 | Candid | - | Short |
| 2018 | The Products of the American Ghetto | Easy | Also executive producer |
| 2018 | The Choir Director | Aaron Mackie | |
| 2018 | Nothing Like Thanksgiving | Kenneth Swain | Also executive producer |
| 2018 | Intensive Care | Jeremiah | |
| 2018 | It's a Date | Wesley Franks | |
| 2018 | Kinky | Bradley | |
| 2019 | The Last Astronaut | General James Rex | Nominated — WorldFest-Houston International Film Festival Award for Best Supporting Actor |
| 2019 | Submission | Cowboy | |
| 2019 | Staged Killer | Trent | |
| 2020 | Happiness | | |
| 2022 | Sons 2 the Grave | Detective David Reynolds | |
| 2022 | Chocolate City 3: Live Tour | Magnus | |
| 2023 | Forbidden Daughter | Shannon | |
| 2023 | Till Death Do Us | Pastor Marcus | |
| 2024 | Spawns | Ian Banks | |
| 2024 | Bid for Love 2 | Mr. Neely | |

=== Television ===
| Year | Title | Role | Notes |
|---|---|---|---|
| 1999 | Double Platinum | Dancer | TV movie |
| 2000–04 | Soul Food | Lem Van Adams | Main cast |
| 2007 | Life Support | MJ2 | TV movie |
| 2007–08 | Lincoln Heights | Ruben | Recurring cast: season 2-3 |
| 2010 | Gillian in Georgia | Terrance | Recurring cast |
| 2011 | Single Ladies | Blake | Episode: "Cry Me a River" & "Indecent Proposal" |
| 2011 | Champion Road the Series | Benjamin | TV mini series |
| 2011 | The Ideal Husband | Devin | TV movie |
| 2011 | Milk & Honey | Damon | Episode: "Pilot" |
| 2013 | In the Meantime | Kwame | TV movie |
| 2014 | Being Mary Jane | - | Episode: "The Huxtables Have Fallen" |
| 2017 | Vivica's Black Magic | Choreographer/Self | TV series |
| 2018 | The Avengers of Extreme Illusions | General James Rex | Episode: "The Last Astronaut" |
| 2018–present | The Family Business | Orlando Duncan | Main cast |
| 2020 | Steppin' Back to Love | Derrick | TV movie |
| 2020–2024 | Double Cross | Detective Ryan | Main cast, also producer |
| 2022 | I Got a Story to Tell | Detective Carlson | Episode: "I'm So Fatefull" |

== Awards ==
| Year | Award | Category | Production | Result |
|---|---|---|---|---|
| 2000 | MTV Video Music Awards | Best Choreography | "Bye Bye Bye" (by NSYNC) | Winner |
| 2004 | NAACP Image Awards | Outstanding Supporting Actor in a Drama Series | Soul Food | Nomination |
| 2005 | NAACP Image Awards | Outstanding Supporting Actor in a Drama Series | Soul Food | Nomination |
| 2019/20 | High Maintenance Award | Author of the Year | Book: Pregnant With Thought | Winner |
