= Imani Hakim =

American actress (born 1993)

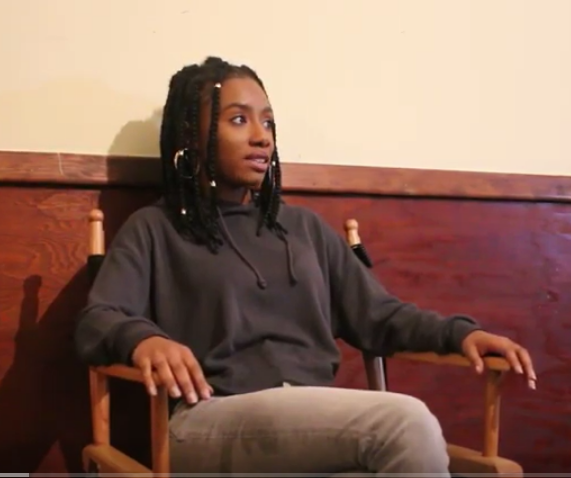
- Hakim in 2018
- Born: August 12, 1993 (age 33); Cleveland, Ohio, U.S.
- Occupation: Actress
- Years active: 2005–present
- Known for: Everybody Hates Chris, Mythic Quest
- Children: One1

Imani Hakim (born August 12, 1993) is an American actress. She is best known for her role as Tonya Rock on the UPN/CW sitcom Everybody Hates Chris as well as portraying Olympic gold medalist Gabby Douglas in the 2014 Lifetime original movie The Gabby Douglas Story. Hakim acted in the films Chocolate City and Burning Sands, and had a supporting role on the Apple TV+ television series Mythic Quest.

== Career ==
Hakim was born and raised in Cleveland, Ohio. She has two older brothers and three younger brothers. When she was seven, she studied acting at Karamu House Theater in Cleveland. She convinced her parents to allow her to pursue a professional acting career when she was 11 and moved to Los Angeles with her father to find work. They experienced homelessness during that time and frequently slept in their car. However, within a few months, she booked her first role as Chris's little sister Tonya on Everybody Hates Chris. The series was on-air for four seasons, from 2005 to 2009. During that time, she was homeschooled. In California, Hakim continued to study acting at Alexander's Workshop School in Lakewood and at The Young Actor's Space in Burbank.

Hakim later starred as Olympic gymnast Gabby Douglas in the Lifetime biopic The Gabby Douglas Story (2014). The next year she acted in a supporting role in the film Chocolate City starring Robert Ri'chard.

As of 2020, she portrays Dana, a video game tester, on the Apple TV+ comedy series Mythic Quest. The series was renewed for a third and fourth season in 2021. She also co-starred in the film Dinner Party in 2020.

== Personal life ==
Hakim follows a carnivorous diet. She enjoys painting in her free time. Hakim is engaged to fellow Mythic Quest actor Chris Naoki Lee, with whom she gave birth to their first child, Kazuo-Marley Hakim Lee, on February 2, 2025.

== Filmography ==
Television and film roles
| Year | Title | Role | Notes |
|---|---|---|---|
| 2005–2009 | Everybody Hates Chris | Tonya Rock | Main role; 88 episodes |
| 2006 | CSI: Crime Scene Investigation | Darcy | Episode: "The Unusual Suspect" |
| 2007 | Reign Over Me | Jocelyn Johnson | |
| 2008 | The Replacements | Tiffany | Voice role; 2 episodes |
| 2009 | ER | Anastasia Johnson | 3 episodes |
| 2009 | Wizards of Waverly Place | Jump Rope Girl | Episode: "Marathoner Helper" |
| 2014 | The Gabby Douglas Story | Gabby Douglas | Television film |
| 2015 | Chocolate City | Carmen | |
| 2016 | Sharknado: The 4th Awakens | Gabrielle | Television film |
| 2017 | Chocolate City: Vegas Strip | Carmen | Direct-to-video film |
| 2017 | Sollers Point | Cadance | |
| 2017 | Burning Sands | Rochon | |
| 2018 | Down for Whatever | Sonya | Television film |
| 2018 | Cam | Hannah Darin / Baby | |
| 2020–2025 | Mythic Quest | Dana | Main role Director: "The Room Where It Happens" |
| 2023 | Adventure Time: Fionna and Cake | Beth | 2 episodes |
| 2023–2025 | Pokémon Concierge | Alisa | Voice role; English dub |
| 2023 | A Southern Hunting | LuLa | Main role |
| 2025 | It's Always Sunny in Philadelphia | —N/a | Director: "Frank Is in a Coma" |
| 2026 | Criminal Minds: Evolution | Kaliyah Burke | Episode: "Body Count" |
