= Patriot Pictures =

Patriot Pictures is an American independent film production and financing company founded by Michael Mendelsohn. Its credits include Sand and Sorrow, All's Faire in Love, Zeroville, Cut Throat City, God Is a Bullet and DreamQuil. The company has also distributed films through its distribution arm, Patriot Releasing, and announced plans to expand into horror filmmaking in 2025.

== Selected filmography ==
Year	Title	Notes	Ref
2007	Sand and Sorrow	Presented by Patriot Pictures	
2011	All's Faire in Love	Produced and financed by Patriot Pictures	
2014	Zeroville	Production involvement; financed by Union Patriot Capital Management	
2018	Kinky	U.S. theatrical distribution by Patriot Releasing	
2023	God Is a Bullet	Produced by Patriot Pictures	
2024	DreamQuil	Produced by Patriot Pictures	
