= Fear factor (disambiguation) =

Fear Factor is a franchise that spanned from the original stunt/dare game TV show, Fear Factor.

It may also refer to:

== Literature ==
- The Fear Factor, a book by Abigail Marsh

== Television ==
- Fear Factor: Khatron Ke Khiladi, the Indian version of the show

=== Episodes ===
- "Fear Factor", Dangerous Flights season 1, episode 4 (2012)
- "Fear Factor", Doctor Who Confidential series 2, episode 3 (2006)
- "Fear Factor", Instant Mom season 1, episode 1 (2015)
- "Fear Factor", Let's Stay Together season 2, episode 11 (2012)
- "Fear Factor", Logan's Run episode 8 (1977)
- "Fear Factor", Mac Miller and the Most Dope Family season 2, episode 8 (2014)
- "Fear Factor", Three Delivery series 1, episode 20 (2009)
- "Fear Factor", Thunderbirds 2086 episode 4 (1982)
- "The Fear Factor", The Division season 1, episode 7 (2001)
- "The Fear Factor", Yu-Gi-Oh! GX season 1, episode 34 (2005)
- "The Fear Factors", Taina season 2, episode 12 (2002)

== See also ==
- Fear Factory, an American rock/metal band
