= Michael Mendelsohn =

- Education: University of Pennsylvania
- Occupations: Film financier; Film producer

Michael Mendelsohn is an American film financier and producer, and founder of Patriot Pictures.

Through Patriot Pictures and Union Patriot Capital Management, he has worked with filmmakers and production companies on independent film projects. In 2012, Variety reported that Mendelsohn had arranged more than $1.8 billion in production financing for, or produced, more than 298 films. In 2025, he produced DreamQuil and helped secure financing for California Schemin', directed by James McAvoy.

== Education and early career ==
Mendelsohn attended the University of Pennsylvania's Wharton School of Business, while also studying English and Russian literature. At 17, he began working in the entertainment industry at Johnny Carson Productions. After graduating, he joined Union Bank, later spending about a decade at BNP Paribas, where he worked in entertainment finance.

== Selected filmography ==
Year	Title	Credit
2005	Lord of War	Producer
2014	Rage	Producer
2015	Chocolate City	Producer
2015	Wild Horses	Producer
2015	I Am Michael	Producer
2016	I Am Wrath	Producer
2016	USS Indianapolis: Men of Courage	Producer
2017	Vengeance: A Love Story	Producer
2017	My Name Is Lenny	Producer
2017	Chocolate City: Vegas Strip	Producer
2018	Kinky	Producer
2019	Synchronic	Producer
2019	Running with the Devil	Producer
2019	Zeroville	Producer
2020	Cut Throat City	Producer
2021	Prisoners of the Ghostland	Producer
2022	Blackout	Producer
2023	God Is a Bullet	Producer
2024	Almost Popular	Producer
2025	California Schemin'	Producer
2026	DreamQuil	Producer
