= Let's Stay Together (TV series) =

- Genre: Romantic comedy
- Created by: Jacque Edmonds Cofer
- Starring: Bert Belasco; Nadine Ellis; Joyful Drake; RonReaco Lee; Erica Hubbard; Kyla Pratt
- Theme music composer: Al Green; Willie Mitchell; Al Jackson Jr.
- Opening theme: "Let's Stay Together"
- Country of origin: United States
- Original language: English
- No. of seasons: 4
- No. of episodes: 55 (list of episodes)

Production
- Executive producers: Jacque Edmonds Cofer; Queen Latifah; Shakim Compere
- Camera setup: Multi-camera
- Running time: 30 minutes
- Production companies: Georgia Media; Cofer Entertainment Group; Flavor Unit Entertainment; BET Original Production

Original release
- Network: BET
- Release: January 11, 2011 – April 29, 2014

Let's Stay Together is an American romantic comedy television series created by Jacque Edmonds Cofer. It premiered on BET on January 11, 2011. The title of the series refers to Al Green's 1972 song of the same name. The series premiere drew 4.4 million viewers. Initially, Soul Food star Malinda Williams was cast in the lead role of Stacy. For undisclosed reasons, she was replaced by Nadine Ellis.

On April 20, 2011, BET announced that the series was renewed for a second season which aired 22 episodes starting in January 2012. For its second season, Erica Hubbard appeared infrequently due to her pregnancy. New cast member Kyla Pratt (formerly of UPN's One on One) joined the cast portraying Crystal, Charles and Kita's cousin. At the 2012 BET Upfront on April 13, 2012, it was revealed that the show has been renewed for a third season. The third season premiered on March 26, 2013. In April 2013, BET Networks announced the show had been renewed for a fourth season which premiered on March 4, 2014. In September 2014, it was announced that the series was cancelled.

== Synopsis ==
Let's Stay Together is the story of Stacy Lawrence (Nadine Ellis), a pediatrician who is engaged to Charles Whitmore (Bert Belasco), the contractor she hired to remodel her kitchen. Stacy and Charles have a fun, sexy, intense dynamic. However, six months in, some of the magic of finally finding a soul mate has worn off, and they find themselves constantly renegotiating their rules of cohabitation. In contrast, Stacy's super-fabulous younger sister Tasha (Joyful Drake) and her husband Jamal (RonReaco Lee) act like an old married couple even though they're only in their 20s. Tasha made a lot of mistakes in love before she found a stable, ambitious guy like Jamal so she has dedicated herself to pleasing her man and raising their six-month-old twins. Jamal considers himself lucky to have a fine, dedicated wife like Tasha even though she does bring the drama on a regular basis. Charles’ earthy younger sister Kita (Erica Hubbard), a proud employee of the DMV, is celebrating her independence by taking a break from dating while she explores all that life has to offer before she settles down.

== Episodes ==
Season	Episodes	Originally released	
Season	Episodes	First released	Last released
1	13	January 11, 2011	April 5, 2011
2	22	January 10, 2012	June 5, 2012
3	10	March 26, 2013	May 21, 2013
4	10	March 4, 2014	April 29, 2014

== Cast and characters ==
=== Main ===
- Bert Belasco as Charles Whitmore, a self-employed building contractor and older brother to Kita; Married to Stacy.
- Nadine Ellis as Stacy Lawrence-Whitmore, a successful conservative pediatrician; Married to Charles; Tasha's sister.
- Joyful Drake as Tasha Lawrence-Woodson, Happy housewife to Jamal and mother of twins; Stacy's sister; owner of a baby's boutique.
- Erica Hubbard as Kita Whitmore, Charles' self-assured younger sister. Season 1, Kita worked at a DMV until she quit in season 2 to be a part of a reality show. She then became a bartender. Now she is in the Police Academy training to be an Officer of the Law.
- RonReaco Lee as Jamal Woodson, a legal aid attorney and Tasha's husband. Jamal has now decided to run for councilman of his community.
- Kyla Pratt as Crystal Whitmore, cousin of Charles and Kita Whitmore. A young and outspoken film studies major at Clark Atlanta University. (seasons 2–4)

=== Recurring ===
- Kym Whitley as Charmaine Wax (seasons 1–2)
- Daphne Maxwell Reid as Juanita Lawrence, Stacy and Tasha's mother. (seasons 1–2)
- Ron Canada as Garrison Lawrence, Stacy and Tasha's father.
- Lawrence Hilton-Jacobs as Charles Whitmore Sr., Charles and Kita's father.
- Jackée Harry as Delores Whitmore, Charles and Kita's mother.
- Christian Keyes as Troy, Tasha's ex-boyfriend from college who still has feelings for her.
- Jackie Long as Micah, Kita's ex-boyfriend who sparks her interest in law enforcement. (seasons 2–4)
- Tony Bravado as Darkanian Le'Johnson, a cocky NFL player who falls for Crystal. In the season 2 finale, it was revealed that Darkanian is gay and has a boyfriend who he kept a secret out of fear that it would affect his football career prospects. (seasons 2–4)
- Darlene French White as Aunt Jean, Charles, Crystal and Kita's aunt. (season 2)
- T'Keyah Crystal Keymáh as Dr. Blair Riley, Stacy's rival physician at the clinic. (season 3)
- Russell Pitts as Rashad, Jamal and Tasha's babysitter for the twins and Crystal's love interest. (season 3)
- Erika Alexander as Blanche (season 4)

=== Guest stars ===
- Kim Fields
- Eva Marcille
- Kandi Burruss
- Anna Maria Horsford
- Tichina Arnold
- Thomas Mikal Ford
- Nicole Ari Parker
- Kim Coles
- Donnie McClurkin
- Thomas Miles
- Countess Vaughn
- Danny Erskine
- Queen Latifah
- Vanessa Bell Calloway
- James Lesure
- Henry Simmons
- Bobb'e J. Thompson
- Damien Dante Wayans
- Chris Spencer
- Kelly Perine
- Roz Ryan
- La La Anthony
- Rickey Smiley
- Omarion
- Cory Hardrict
- Paula Jai Parker
- Tony Rock
- Chico Benymon
- Roland "Buddy" Lewis
- NeNe Leakes
- Jasmine Guy
- Judge Greg Mathis
- Ernie Hudson
- Naturi Naughton
