= Cousin Skeeter =

American sitcom

- Genre: Sitcom; Puppetry
- Created by: Phil Beauman; Alonzo Brown; Brian Robbins
- Starring: Robert Ri'chard; Rondell Sheridan; Meagan Good; Angela Means; Bill Bellamy
- Composer: Kurt Farquhar
- Country of origin: United States
- Original language: English
- No. of seasons: 3
- No. of episodes: 52 (list of episodes)

Production
- Executive producers: Mike Tollin; Brian Robbins; Joe Davola; Brad Kaaya; Jerry Perzigian
- Camera setup: Film; Single-camera
- Running time: 24 minutes
- Production companies: Tollin/Robbins Productions (1998-2002) (seasons 1-3); Marquee/Tollin/Robbins Productions (1999-2000) (season 2); Nickelodeon Productions

Original release
- Network: Nickelodeon
- Release: September 1, 1998 – November 2, 2002

Cousin Skeeter is an American sitcom, that originally aired on Nickelodeon from 1998 to 2002. It starred Robert Ri'chard as Bobby, a young boy whose life is changed when his strange cousin, Skeeter, comes to stay with his family. With Skeeter's help, Bobby learns life lessons and tackles the ups and downs of growing up. The show also included Meagan Good as Bobby's friend Nina, Rondell Sheridan as Bobby's father Andre, and Angela Means as Bobby's mother Vanessa. Skeeter is portrayed by a puppet with Bill Bellamy providing his voice, and Drew Massey performing the puppetry, assisted by Alice Dinnean. Although the series was shot in a single-camera format, the show used a laugh track.

The show's theme song is an alternate version of 702's 1996 debut single "Steelo", co-written by and featuring Missy Elliott.

== Overview ==
Cousin Skeeter first aired on September 1, 1998, on Nickelodeon, sharing the 8–9 pm programming block with The Wild Thornberrys. Cousin Skeeter was one of many shows at this time to touch on the idea of multicultural themes, with notable shows such as The Brothers García originating around this time as well. Skeeter frequently causes mischief, which is often balanced out by Bobby having to correct the situation.

== Episodes ==
Season	Episodes	Originally released	
Season	Episodes	First released	Last released
1	20	September 1, 1998	April 1, 1999
2	23	August 17, 1999	July 8, 2000
3	9	January 14, 2001	November 2, 2002

== Characters ==
=== Main ===
- Skeeter (portrayed by a puppet performed by Drew Massey, voiced by Bill Bellamy) - Skeeter is the namesake character of the series, whose life changed when he moved from Georgia to New York City to live with his cousin Bobby. He is loud-mouthed, impulsive, and reckless, but also affable, confident, good-hearted and charismatic. He spends each episode getting Bobby into trouble trying to help him solve problems and stand up to life's challenges. Skeeter is also friends with several notable celebrities, including Michael Jordan, MC Lyte (whose life he apparently saved), and Dennis Rodman. He is not easily angry, unless someone remarks on his shortness, which causes him to fly into a rage.
- Bobby Walker (portrayed by Robert Ri'chard) - Originally from Inglewood, California, Bobby is smart and well-behaved. Often the victim of his cousin's mischief, Bobby often gets mad at Skeeter for his antics, but Bobby sees the good intentions behind his actions and likes him nonetheless.
- André Walker (portrayed by Rondell Sheridan) - Bobby's father who is a music producer.
- Nina Jones (portrayed by Meagan Good) - Nina is Bobby's best friend. She and Bobby have a crush on each other at the start of the show and later start dating. She is a fast talker and Nicole's best friend.
- Vanessa Walker (portrayed by Angela Means) - Bobby's mother, a lawyer, is often annoyed by Skeeter just like Bobby is. She and Andre cannot wait for the boys to go to college, and the couple will do anything to get Skeeter and Bobby out of their hair.

=== Supporting ===
- Nicole (portrayed by a puppet performed by Julianne Buescher, voiced by Tisha Campbell) - Nicole has more class and manners than Skeeter. She first appeared as a new student in the second season's TV movie, "New Kids on the Planet". Nicole quickly became best friends with Nina and they are like sisters. She is depicted as tough, once wanting to join the high school football team and threatening to hurt the school bully if he hurt Skeeter.
- Duke - Bobby's friend Duke appeared in the first and second seasons of the series.
- Geoff - One of Bobby's friends from school, Geoff always seems to be a bad role model for the boys.
- Brenda (portrayed by Lisa "Left Eye" Lopes)

== Reception ==
=== Critical ===
Cousin Skeeter received mixed reviews. A writer from The Hollywood Reporter described the shows characters as "undeveloped" and "dependent on a one-liner approach". Others note that the contrast between Bobby and Skeeter is meant to act as a kind of role model for children, but the message is lost in the strange behavior of Skeeter. Many viewers found it odd that the fact that Skeeter is an actual puppet is never acknowledged by any other characters, which left them to wonder why he was even a puppet in the first place. Ray Richmond, a writer for Variety, found the content borderline offensive, calling it an "a half-hour entrant in Nickelodeon’s primetime "Nickel-O-Zone" lineup" that sends "TVs view of black culture careening back to the Stone Age". However, Rotten Tomatoes rated it as one of five 1990s children's shows that helped "pave the way for black representation on TV", with the article citing the episode "The Bicycle Thief" which tackled the issue of police interacting with black children.

=== Ratings ===
According to a Variety article from February 1999, Cousin Skeeter was "consistently ranked as the top-rated live-action series for the [Nickelodeon] network".

=== Award and nominations ===
- 1999
  - Young Artist Award nominated for best performance in a TV Drama or Comedy series - Leading Young Actor: Robert Ri'chard
  - Outstanding Performance in a Youth or Children's Series/Special: Bill Bellamy
- 2000
  - Outstanding Youth or Children's Series/Special
  - Outstanding Directorial Achievement in Children's Programs: Johnathan Winfrey
  - Best Performance in a TV Comedy Series - Guest Starring Young Performer: Rachel Glenn
  - Best Performance in a TV Comedy Series - Leading Young Actor: Robert Ri'chard
- 2001
  - Outstanding Youth or Children's Series/Special
  - African American Achievement award for supporting actresses - Rissa JB Milhouse (episode 14)
  - Best Performance in a TV Comedy Series - Leading Young Actor: Robert Ri'chard
