= Black Coffee (2014 film) =

- Directed by: Mark Harris
- Written by: Mark Harris
- Produced by: ND Brown; Mark Harris
- Starring: Darrin Henson; Christian Keyes; Lamman Rucker; Gabrielle Dennis; Erica Hubbard
- Cinematography: Adam Lee
- Edited by: Dante Wyatt
- Music by: John Christopher Bell
- Production companies: 1555 Filmworks; Tri Destined Studios
- Distributed by: One Village Entertainment; RLJ Entertainment
- Release date: 10 January 2014
- Running time: 85 minutes
- Country: United States
- Language: English

Black Coffee is a 2014 American romantic comedy film directed by Mark Harris, starring Darrin Henson, Christian Keyes, Lamman Rucker, Gabrielle Dennis and Erica Hubbard.

== Cast ==
- Darrin Henson as Robert
- Christian Keyes as Julian
- Lamman Rucker as Hill
- Gabrielle Dennis as Morgan
- Erica Hubbard as Mita
- Josh Ventura as Nate
- Richard Gallion as Duke

== Release ==
The film was released on 10 January 2014.

== Reception ==
The Hollywood Reporter wrote that while the film "may not be good to the last drop", it "has its heart in the right place", and "offers some pleasurable jolts along the way". Film critic Kam Williams called the film a "pat, if unconvincing, romantic romp determined to march inexorably to an implausible, happily ever after finale, whether you like it or not." Sheila O'Malley of RogerEbert.com rated the film 1.5 stars out of 4 and wrote that while the film "means well" and has "some interesting and exciting ideas, and a couple of funny lines", it is "too big of a mess". Geoff Berkshire of Variety wrote that while most of the cast "generally struggles to elevate the one-note roles", Henson "musters up enough leading man charm to carry the drama’s light weight load."

Brent Simon of Paste gave the film a rating of 4/10 and wrote that the film is "too shot through with trite expressions of familiar scenarios, and weighed down by a phony redemption and catharsis pegged to its significantly boorish significant others, to connect in any meaningful way", and called it a "cheap, tepid store-brand blend, of dubious quality." David Noh of Film Journal International wrote that "uniformly attractive cast are in there at all times, valiantly pitching away, but are mostly sunk by Harris' thuddingly banal notions", while "Dennis' sharp intelligence manages to occasionally gleam through all the glib mediocrity." Tracy Moore of Common Sense Media rated the film 2 stars out of 5 and called it "middling".
