= Bert Belasco =

American actor

Bert Belasco III (c. 1982 - November 9, 2020) was an American actor. He was known for his role as Charles Whitmore in the BET television series Let's Stay Together (2011-2014). He also had recurring roles as Sonny Evers in the Fox series Pitch (2016-2016) and Rene Marson in the Showtime series I'm Dying Up Here (2017-2018).

== Personal life and death ==
Belasco was raised in New York City and Allentown, Pennsylvania before moving to Naperville, Illinois. He graduated from Waubsonie Valley High School in Aurora, Illinois. In 2005, he earned a theater degree from Southern Illinois University Carbondale. At the time of his death, Belasco was residing in Woodland Hills, Los Angeles.

On November 8, 2020, Belasco's body was found in his hotel room in Richmond, Virginia. Belasco was in Richmond because he was preparing to act in a feature film there. He was pronounced dead at 2:52 am on November 9. It was announced in January 2021 that Belasco died of natural causes.

== Filmography ==
=== Film ===
Year	Title	Role	Notes
2009	N.C.B.S.	Veteran in therapy	Short film
2017	WTF: World Thumbwrestling Federation	Mr. Venom	

=== Television ===
Year	Title	Role	Notes
2007	House	PFC Garcia	1 episode
2007	Dash 4 Cash	Durkin	TV movie
2008	Starting Under	Bernard	TV movie
2010	Justified	Lane	1 episode
2012	No Names	The Man/Ray Paul	1 episode
2011-2014	Let's Stay Together	Charles Whitmore	52 episodes
2014	Key & Peele	Rhino Teammate	1 episode
2015	The Soul Man	Laron	1 episode
2016	NCIS: New Orleans	Alexander Hanson	1 episode
2016	Pitch	Sonny Evers	6 episodes
2017	The Mick	Dante	1 episode
2018	Superstore	Neil	1 episode
2018	I'm Dying Up Here	Rene Marson	5 episodes
2019	American Princess	Lord Beerness	2 episodes
2020	Game On: A Comedy Crossover Event	Kory	1 episode
2020	The Big Show Show	Kory	1 episode
