= List of Let's Stay Together episodes =

Let's Stay Together is an American romantic comedy television series created by Jacque Edmonds Cofer. It premiered on BET on January 11, 2011. The series premiere drew 4.4 million viewers. Initially, Soul Food star Malinda Williams was cast in the lead role of Stacy. For undisclosed reasons, she was recast with Nadine Ellis. On April 20, 2011, BET announced that the series was renewed for a second season which aired 22 episodes starting in January 2012. For its second season, Erica Hubbard appeared infrequently due to her pregnancy. New cast member Kyla Pratt (formerly of UPN's One on One) joined the cast portraying Crystal, Charles and Kita's cousin. At the 2012 BET Upfront on April 13, 2012, it was revealed that the show has been renewed for a third season. The third season premiered on March 26, 2013. In April 2013, BET Networks announced the show had been renewed for a fourth season which premiered on March 4, 2014.

== Series overview ==
Season	Episodes	Originally released	
Season	Episodes	First released	Last released
1	13	January 11, 2011	April 5, 2011
2	22	January 10, 2012	June 5, 2012
3	10	March 26, 2013	May 21, 2013
4	10	March 4, 2014	April 29, 2014

== Episodes ==
=== Season 1 (2011) ===
No. overall	No. in season	Title	Directed by	Written by	Original release date	U.S. viewers (millions)
1	1	"If You'd Like It, You'd Better Put A Ring On It"	Leonard R. Garner, Jr.	Arthur L. Harris, Jr.	January 11, 2011	4.4
In the series premiere, Stacy discovers that Charles gives her the same ring he gave his ex. Meanwhile, Jamal plays piano in the bar while Kita sings. Guest star: Eva Marcille
2	2	"On to the Next One"	Henry Chan	Jacque Edmonds Cofer	January 18, 2011	3.52
Stacy and Charles spice things up in the bedroom but soon find themselves exhausted. Elsewhere, Jamal objects to Tasha's wardrobe choice for their son during a photo shoot. Guest star: Kym Whitley
3	3	"The Fourth Wheel"	Henry Chan	Shawnte McCall	January 25, 2011	2.76
Charles meets Stacy's med school friends. Meanwhile, Jamal's client attempts to seduce him. Guest stars: Nicole Ari Parker, James Lesure
4	4	"Marriage 101"	Kim Fields	Jacque Edmonds Cofer	February 1, 2011	2.69
Charles and Stacy go to pre-marital counseling. Meanwhile, Kita makes Tasha jealous. Guest star: Tichina Arnold
5	5	"The Handyman Can't"	Kim Fields	Arthur L. Harris, Jr.	February 8, 2011	2.57
Stacy hires Charles to renovate her office. Elsewhere, Kita has romantic dreams of Jamal. Guest star: Bobb'e J. Thompson
6	6	"Dirty Scraps of Leather"	Henry Chan	Jacque Edmonds Cofer	February 15, 2011	2.51
A gift from Stacy's old boyfriend bothers Charles, so he decides to replace it; Tasha worries she's less attractive now that she's a stay-at-home mom.
7	7	"The Wedding Planner"	Kim Fields	Raynelle Swilling	February 22, 2011	2.35
Charles hires a wedding planner since Stacy is procrastinating; Tasha becomes an entrepreneur. Guest star: Anna Maria Horsford
8	8	"Your Arm's Too Short to Box With Godparents"	Leonard R. Garner, Jr.	Michael Carrington	March 1, 2011	2.41
Stacy is offended and gets in a fight with Tasha; Jamal and Charles sneak around to see each other. Kita takes a vow of silence. Guest star: Brad James
9	9	"There Goes the Groom"	Leonard R. Garner, Jr.	Story by : Michelle Lesley Johnson; Teleplay by : Jacque Edmonds Cofer	March 8, 2011	2.31
Stacy exhibits cold feet at her engagement party, prompting Charles to question if she's ready to get married. Elsewhere, Jamal discovers that Tasha's father is still supporting her financially. Guest star: Jackée Harry, Ron Canada
10	10	"Rules of Disengagement"	Eric Dean Seaton	Arthur L. Harris, Jr.	March 15, 2011	2.01
Charles and Stacy reconnect, but Charles thinks they should keep their distance until Stacy sets a wedding date. Elsewhere, Jamal and Tasha attempt to write a children's book. Guest star: Thomas Miles
11	11	"Daddy's Home"	Eric Dean Seaton	Erika Graham	March 22, 2011	1.91
Stacy goes on a date to test her feelings for Charles; Tasha tries to impress a mothers' group; and Charles reflects on his problems after a visit with his dad. Guest star: Lawrence Hilton-Jacobs, Henry Simmons, Vanessa Bell Calloway
12	12	"Back Together Again"	Henry Chan	Michael Carrington	March 29, 2011	2.74
Tasha and Jamal arrange a reunion for Stacy and Charles, but the plan hits a snag when their intended targets each bring dates. Guest stars: Countess Vaughn, Kym Whitley, Chris Spencer
13	13	"Together Forever-Ever?"	Henry Chan	Jacque Edmonds Cofer	April 5, 2011	1.5
In the first-season finale, Stacy and Charles reminisce at their rehearsal dinner about the start of their relationship. Later, the pair's wedding day features a few unexpected moments. Guest stars: Jackée Harry, Daphne Maxwell Reid, Ron Canada, Lawrence Hilton-Jacobs, Thomas Mikal Ford, Christian Keyes

=== Season 2 (2012) ===
No. overall	No. in season	Title	Directed by	Written by	Original release date	U.S. viewers (millions)
14	1	"Let's Do It Again"	Leonard R. Garner, Jr.	Jacque Edmonds Cofer	January 10, 2012	3.46
Season 2 opens and picks up with dramas surrounding Charles' and Stacy's wedding. Here, Charles escapes from an elevator and attempts to head home. Meanwhile, Troy arrives at Stacy's house, upsetting Jamal. Guest stars: Daphne Maxwell Reid, Christian Keyes
15	2	"Waiting to XXXhale"	Leonard R. Garner, Jr.	Arthur Harris	January 10, 2012	2.71
When Stacy finds out that Charles watches pornography, she sets out to make adult material with him. Elsewhere, Kita throws her own birthday bash and is encouraged to sign up for a reality show. Guest stars: Kim Coles, Kandi Burruss, Christian Keyes
16	3	"All Juice, No Seeds"	Leonard R. Garner, Jr.	Shawnté McCall	January 17, 2012	2.21
Stacy vows to be the perfect housewife. Jamal and Tasha debate whether or not he should get a vasectomy. Meanwhile, Charles' cousin Crystal arrives and becomes a hit on the Web. Guest stars: Roz Ryan, Kelly Perine Absent: Erica Hubbard as Kita
17	4	"U Say He's Just a Friend"	Leonard R. Garner, Jr.	Raynelle Swilling	January 24, 2012	2.04
Charles helps Stacy become financially responsible. Tasha lands work with Troy. Crystal dates a former pimp. Guest star: Chico Benymon Absent: Erica Hubbard as Kita
18	5	"Dancing With the Stars"	Leonard R. Garner, Jr.	Raynelle Swilling	January 31, 2012	2.26
A celebrity client charms Charles and, eventually, Stacy. Meanwhile, Jamal lands work with Troy. Guest stars: Jasmine Guy, Christian Keyes Absent: Erica Hubbard as Kita
19	6	"Sickness Protection Program"	Leonard R. Garner, Jr.	Arthur Harris	February 7, 2012	1.89
Charles behaves like a baby when he gets sick; Jamal and Troy become running buddies. Meanwhile, Crystal has a dating party for her college schoolmates. Guest stars: Jackée Harry, Christian Keyes Absent: Erica Hubbard as Kita
20	7	"Puppy Love"	Robbie Countryman	Jacque Edmonds Cofer	February 14, 2012	1.70
Stacy is forced to care for her mother's disobedient dog. Meanwhile, Troy assigns Jamal an out-of-town task and then makes a move on Tasha. Guest stars: Roland "Buddy" Lewis, Christian Keyes Absent: Erica Hubbard as Kita
21	8	"Family Business"	Robbie Countryman	Carla Waddles	February 28, 2012	1.91
Jamal represents Charles in a court case. Meanwhile, Tasha launches a celebrity-theme gossip blog. Guest stars: Judge Greg Mathis, NeNe Leakes Absent: Erica Hubbard as Kita
22	9	"Marriage Without Borders"	Robbie Countryman	Kevin A. Garnett	March 6, 2012	1.67
Stacy mulls over traveling abroad for a medical program. Meanwhile, Tasha's blunt remarks and opinions impact Jamal's run for public office. Guest star: Kym Whitley Absent: Erica Hubbard as Kita
23	10	"2 Fast, 2 Furious"	Henry Chan	Raynelle Swilling	March 13, 2012	1.79
Stacy and Tasha's rivalry emerges when both run in a race. Meanwhile, Crystal volunteers to shoot a commercial for Charles' company. Absent: Erica Hubbard as Kita
24	11	"Fear Factor"	Henry Chan	Carla Waddles	March 20, 2012	1.94
Charles and Stacy install a security system in their home. Meanwhile, Crystal and her friends decide to pledge Tasha's sorority. Guest stars: Rickey Smiley, La La Anthony Absent: Erica Hubbard as Kita
25	12	"The Choice Is Yours"	Henry Chan	Yvette Foy	March 27, 2012	1.81
Crystal juggles dating two men. Elsewhere, the unemployed Jamal and the jobless Tasha spend their idle time together—and promptly get on each other's nerves. Guest stars: Omarion Grandberry, Cory Hardrict Absent: Erica Hubbard as Kita
26	13	"The Good, The Bad, and The Comedically Ugly"	Leonard R. Garner, Jr.	Arthur Harris	April 3, 2012	1.67
Charles and Stacy disagree over whether to let Jamal and Tasha host their respective honeymoon festivities. Elsewhere, Kita returns home from her reality-TV shoot and hides her whereabouts from the show's producers.
27	14	"An Even More Indecent Proposal"	Leonard R. Garner, Jr.	Earl Davis	April 10, 2012	1.72
In an attempt to re-create the magic in their marriage, Jamal and Tasha have a spontaneous liaison away from home. Meanwhile, Charles begins working with a friend for business, but finds out that his friend is only interested in his mother. Guest stars: Jackée Harry, Tony Rock
28	15	"Inspect Me, Inspect Me Not"	Leonard R. Garner, Jr.	Raynelle Swilling	April 17, 2012	1.63
In order to score a permit, Charles begins to flirt with a single inspector. Meanwhile, Jamal gets high blood pressure after being stressed out due to Tasha's crazy antics. Also, Kita desperately sets out to seek employment. Guest stars: Paula Jai Parker, Edward 'Grapevine' Fordham Jr., Cedric Pendleton
29	16	"Leave Me Alone"	Robbie Countryman	Carla Banks Waddles	April 24, 2012	1.49
In an effort to become more independent, Stacy decides to reconnect with herself by taking time out for herself. Jamal misplaces his wedding ring. Meanwhile, a cocky NFL player tries to make advances at Kita. Guest star: Tony Bravado
30	17	"The Apprentice"	Robbie Countryman	Jacques Edmonds Cofer	May 1, 2012	1.59
Stacy fires Charles' incompetent friend whom he believes has received a tough break. Meanwhile, Kita prevents a robbery from occurring at the bar. Also, Jamal becomes suspicious of Tasha's secret online activity. Guest stars: Corey Holcomb, Jackie Long
31	18	"Beauty and the Birthday"	Robbie Countryman	Valencia Parker	May 8, 2012	1.52
With Stacy's birthday approaching, Charles has a hard time finding the perfect gift. Meanwhile, Tasha lands a potential client. Guest star: Queen Latifah
32	19	"Owners, Players and Thieves"	Kenn Michael	Story by : Natasha "Tash" Gray; Teleplay by : Shawnté McCall	May 15, 2012	1.55
Stacy believes that it is time for Charles to think about selling his condo, much to Charles' chagrin. Tasha takes on control of the baby boutique. Meanwhile, Kita starts flirting for tips at Lucy's. Guest star: Kym Whitley
33	20	"No Weddings and a Funeral"	Linda Mendoza	Arthur Harris	May 22, 2012	1.52
Stacy attends the funeral of Charles' deceased uncle and gets reacquainted with a woman from his past. Meanwhile, Tasha receives an offer to expand the baby boutique, and Kita wants to take her relationship with Micah to the next level. Crystal moves out of Kita's apartment and in with Darkanian. Guest stars: Kali Hawk, Jackie Long, Tony Bravado, Darlene French White
34	21	"Creepers"	Linda Mendoza	Raynelle Swilling	May 29, 2012	1.62
Jamal is still at odds with Tasha over her decision to open a new baby boutique in Savannah. Kita decides to join the police academy in hopes of being closer to Micah. Elsewhere, Charles helps Connie with home repairs, only to wind up on a hidden-camera reality series that documents cheaters. Guest stars: Jackie Long, Kali Hawk, Victoria Rowell
35	22	"Wait, What?"	Linda Mendoza	Jacque Edmonds Cofer	June 5, 2012	1.97
In the Season 2 finale, Jamal tries to make amends with Tasha by preparing dinner—but she gets stranded in Savannah. Meanwhile, Kita gets accepted into the police academy, which only stirs up tension with Micah; and Charles tries to keep Stacy from seeing him on a hidden-camera reality series about cheaters.

=== Season 3 (2013) ===
No. overall	No. in season	Title	Directed by	Written by	Original release date	U.S. viewers (millions)
36	1	"See, What Had Happened Was..."	Robbie Countryman	Carla Banks Waddles	March 26, 2013	1.88
Stacy confronts Connie about a kiss in the Season 3 opener. Also, Jamal fears that Troy has feelings for Tasha; and Crystal is the recipient of a generous offer. Guest star: Kali Hawk
37	2	"Hot Junk"	Robbie Countryman	Arthur Harris	April 2, 2013	1.31
A dry spell in the bedroom tests Charles; Stacy reaches out to a marriage counselor; Jamal's newest client is a mob boss; Crystal and Kita happen upon Troy, as Kita tries to fight off her feelings for him. Guest stars: Tichina Arnold, Reggie Hayes
38	3	"The Need for Speed"	Debbie Allen	Jacque Edmonds Cofer	April 9, 2013	1.28
Charles and Stacy exchange anniversary gifts, but she becomes overly attached to his motorcycle. Meanwhile, Jamal's mob-boss client goes to jail; and Kita feels she's entitled to Darkanian's perks, exasperating Crystal. Guest star: Reggie Hayes
39	4	"Troy Story"	Robbie Countryman	B. Mark Seabrooks	April 16, 2013	1.53
Stacy and Charles try to set up a love connection for Kita, who mulls over revealing her relationship with Troy. Elsewhere, Tasha serves as Crystal's style coach; Jamal's father works to expand Jamal's client base. Guest stars: Ernie Hudson, Donnie McClurkin
40	5	"Single Black Stacy"	Angela Barnes Gomes	Shawnté McCall	April 23, 2013	1.18
Stacy has a new protégé named Sharon, but Charles suspects that Sharon is far too interested in Stacy. Elsewhere, Jamal and Tasha seek a new nanny for the twins. Guest star: Naturi Naughton
41	6	"Each One, Teach One"	Alfonso Ribeiro	Arthur Harris	April 30, 2013	1.49
Jamal and Charles serve as big brothers to two boys. Elsewhere, Tasha's frustration mounts when Kita dates Troy and Crystal meets a new man.
42	7	"The Other Doctor"	Debbie Allen	Carla Banks Waddles	May 7, 2013	1.25
Stacy begins to lose patients when a doctor moves into her office building. Meanwhile, Charles tries to add sizzle to Jamal's fizzled career, and Kita discovers she'll be working with her ex-beau. Guest stars: T'Keyah Crystal Keymáh, Jackie Long
43	8	"Buyer Beware"	Alfonso Ribeiro	Scott Taylor & Wesley Jermaine Johnson	May 14, 2013	1.40
Stacy purchases a building but must deal with a demanding tenant. Elsewhere, Charles and Jamal temporarily join Darkanian's entourage; Crystal and Rashad inch closer to one another; security is increased at the baby boutique.
44	9	"Kita's Got a Gun"	Debbie Allen	Angela Yarbrough	May 21, 2013	1.22
Kita worries that her quirky father will drive Troy away. Elsewhere, Jamal discovers that Tasha may be hiding money and Stacy and Delores feud while planning a party for Kita. Guest stars: Debbie Allen, Leland L. Jones
45	10	"Babies, Blindness and Bling"	Alfonso Ribeiro	Jacque Edmonds Cofer	May 21, 2013	0.89
Jamal is temporarily blinded when he decides to go to work with Charles. Also, Charles is challenged to care for the twins for the weekend; and Crystal is caught kissing Rashad.

=== Season 4 (2014) ===
No. overall	No. in season	Title	Directed by	Written by	Original release date	U.S. viewers (millions)
46	1	"Dirty Ink"	Henry Chan	Carla Banks Waddles	March 4, 2014	1.72
47	2	"Date My Wife, Please"	Henry Chan	Scott Taylor & Wesley Jermaine Johnson	March 11, 2014	1.25
48	3	"Cam-Paign in My Butt"	Henry Chan	Arthur Harris	March 18, 2014	1.58
49	4	"Million Dollar Stacy"	Angela Barnes Gomes	Scott Taylor & Wesley Jermaine Johnson	March 25, 2014	1.54
50	5	"Game Over"	Alfonso Ribeiro	Carla Banks Waddles	April 1, 2014	N/A
51	6	"Hairy Situations"	Robbie Countryman	Valencia Parker	April 8, 2014	1.42
52	7	"Breakdowns and Billy Clubs"	Robbie Countryman	Zina Camblin	April 15, 2014	1.63
53	8	"Hooked on You"	Leonard R. Garner, Jr.	Arthur Harris	April 22, 2014	1.25
54	9	"Sex, Lies, and Packing Tape"	Leonard R. Garner, Jr.	Scott Taylor & Wesley Jermaine Johnson	April 29, 2014	1.43
55	10	"Full House"	Leonard R. Garner, Jr.	Jacque Edmonds Cofer	April 29, 2014	1.15
