= Vivica A. Fox =

American actress and producer (born 1964)

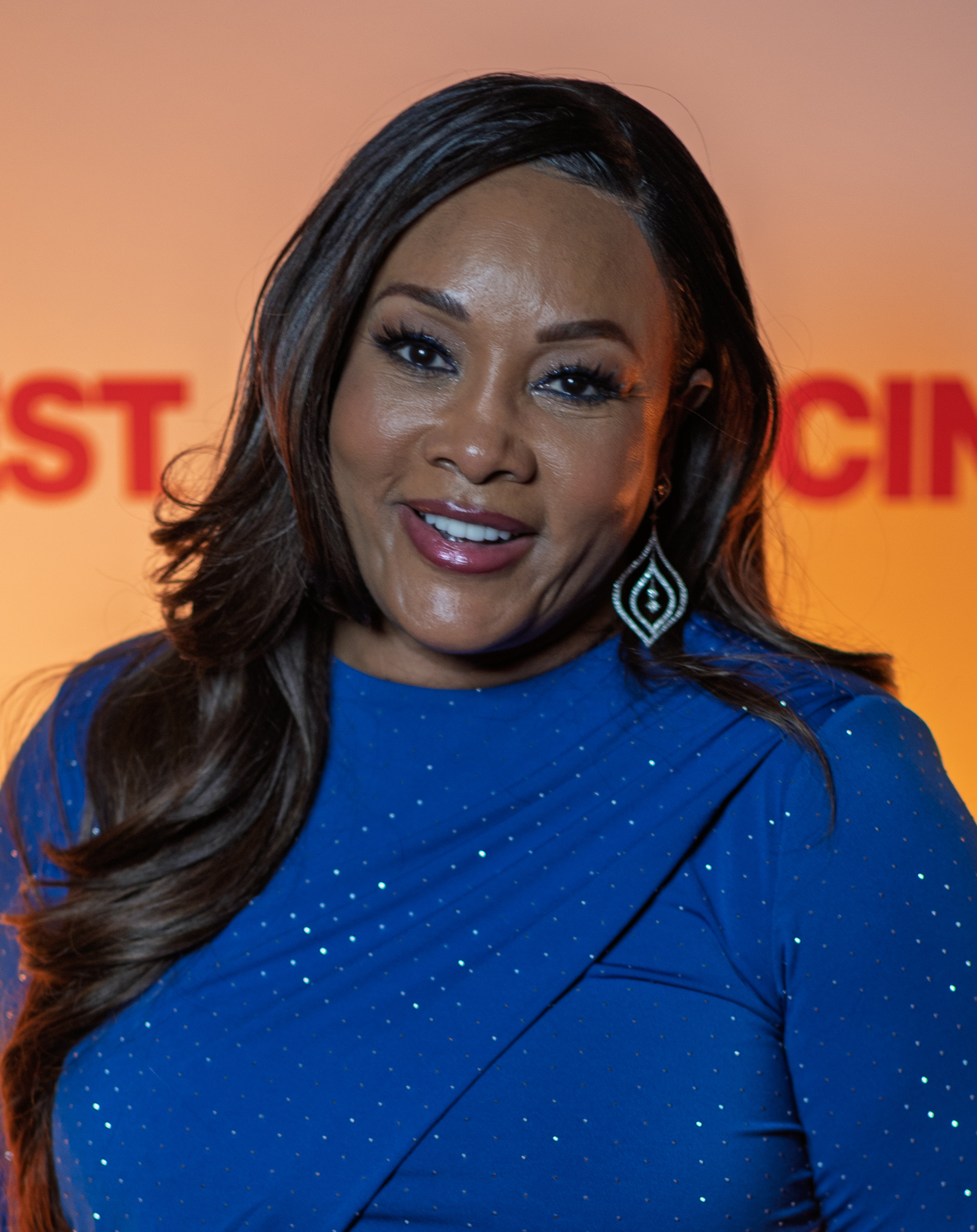
- Fox at the Cinequest Film Festival in 2026
- Born: Vivica Anjanetta Fox; July 30, 1964 (age 62); South Bend, Indiana, U.S.
- Education: Golden West College (AA)
- Occupations: Actress; producer
- Years active: 1982–present
- Spouse: Christopher Harvest (m. 1998; div. 2002)
- Website: vivicafox.com

Vivica Anjanetta Fox (born July 30, 1964) is an American actress, television presenter and producer. She began her career on Soul Train (1982–1983) and played roles on the daytime television soap operas Days of Our Lives (1988) and Generations (1989–1991). In prime time, she starred opposite Patti LaBelle in the NBC sitcom Out All Night (1992–1993). Fox's breakthrough came in 1996, with roles in two box-office hit films, Roland Emmerich's Independence Day and F. Gary Gray's Set It Off.

Fox has starred in the films Booty Call (1997), Soul Food (1997), Why Do Fools Fall in Love (1998), Kingdom Come (2001), Two Can Play That Game (2001), and Boat Trip (2002). She played Vernita Green in Kill Bill (2003) and landed supporting roles in films like Ella Enchanted (2004). She scored leading roles in the short-lived Fox sitcom Getting Personal (1998) and the CBS medical drama City of Angels (2000). From 2003 to 2006, she co-starred in and produced the Lifetime crime drama series Missing, for which she received an NAACP Image Award for Outstanding Actress in a Drama Series. Fox starred in more than 25 The Wrong... movies for Lifetime since 2016 and played Candace Mason in the Fox musical drama series Empire (2015–2020). Her later film appearances include Arkansas (2020) and Is God Is (2026).

Fox's involvement in the entertainment industry goes beyond acting, as she has produced films and TV shows, some of which she did not star in. She made her directorial debut with the 2023 biographical crime film First Lady of BMF: The Tonesa Welch Story about the "First Lady" of the notorious Black Mafia Family in Detroit.

== Early life ==
Fox was born in South Bend, Indiana, the daughter of Everlyena, a pharmaceutical technician, and William Fox, a school administrator. Her parents relocated to the Benton Harbor, Michigan, area soon after her birth. Fox is a 1982 graduate of Arlington High School in Indianapolis and subsequently graduated from Golden West College in Huntington Beach, California, with an Associate of Arts in Social Sciences.

== Career ==
=== 1982–1995 ===
In 1982, Fox relocated to California to attend Golden West College in Huntington Beach. While there, she was a dancer on Soul Train from 1983 to 1984, and also appeared in the music video for R&B group Klymaxx's hit single, "Meeting in the Ladies Room". Afterwards, she started acting professionally, first on the NBC daytime soap opera Days of Our Lives in 1988, playing Carmen Silva. Following her film debut as a hooker in Oliver Stone's 1989 war drama movie Born on the Fourth of July, Fox was cast as Emily Franklin in the pilot episode of ABC comedy series, Living Dolls, a spin-off of the sitcom Who's the Boss? but was replaced with Halle Berry for the remaining episodes. Later that year, Fox was cast as Maya Reubens, the leading character in the NBC daytime soap opera Generations. The series broke new ground as the first soap to feature an African-American family from its inception.

In the early 1990s, Fox began appearing in prime time television, playing guest-starring roles on The Fresh Prince of Bel-Air, Beverly Hills, 90210, Family Matters, Matlock, and Martin. In 1992, she was cast as Patti LaBelle's fashion-designer daughter, Charisse Chamberlain, on the NBC sitcom Out All Night. In addition to this role, she returned to soap operas, playing the role of Dr. Stephanie Simmons on CBS' The Young and the Restless from 1994 to 1995. In 1995, she also had a cameo in the comedy film Don't Be a Menace to South Central While Drinking Your Juice in the Hood.

=== 1996–2003 ===
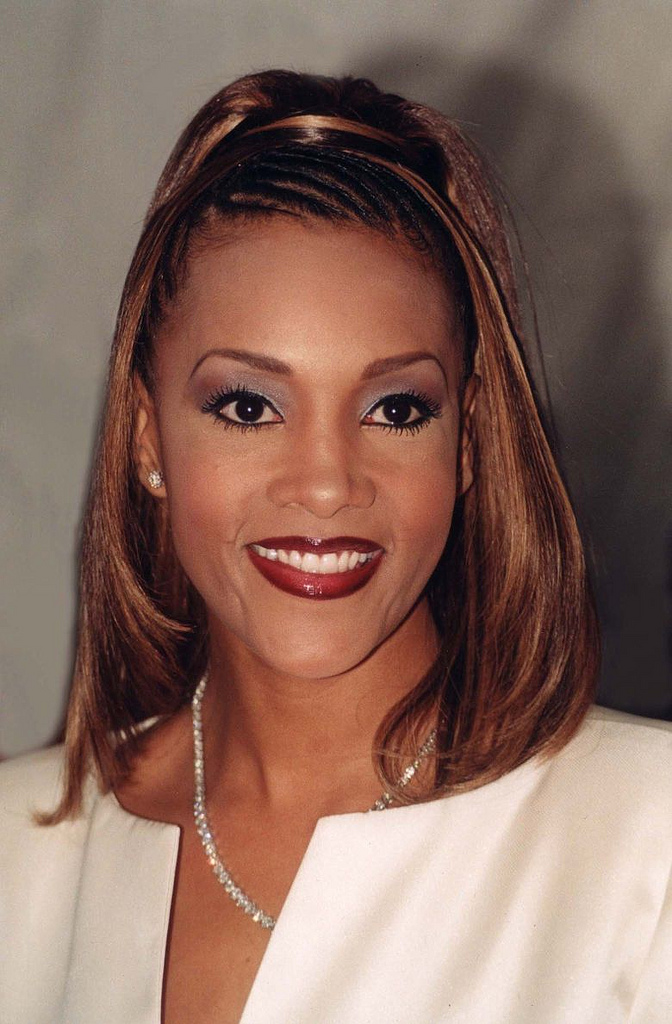
Fox in 1998

In 1996, Fox played Will Smith's character's girlfriend, Jasmine Dubrow, in the epic sci-fi disaster blockbuster Independence Day, directed by Roland Emmerich. The film grossed over $800 million worldwide. Fox received an MTV Movie Award for Best Kiss with Smith, and was nominated for a Saturn Award for Best Supporting Actress. Later that year, she played Francesca "Frankie" Sutton in the crime action film Set It Off opposite Jada Pinkett Smith, Queen Latifah and Kimberly Elise. Directed by F. Gary Gray, Set It Off became a critical and box office success, grossing over $41 million against a budget of $9 million. In 1997, Fox starred in three films: Booty Call, a Columbia Pictures comedy opposite Jamie Foxx; the superhero film Batman & Robin; and 20th Century Fox's critically acclaimed comedy-drama Soul Food. The latter was also a major box office success. For her role, Fox received her first NAACP Image Award for Outstanding Actress in a Motion Picture nomination, and MTV Movie Award for Best Performance.

Fox had additional leading roles on television. She played Queen of Sheba in the British television film Solomon in 1997. That same year, she starred opposite Arsenio Hall in the short-lived ABC sitcom Arsenio. In 1998, she was lead actress in the short-lived Fox sitcom Getting Personal. Also in 1998, Fox starred alongside Halle Berry, Lela Rochon and Larenz Tate in the romantic drama film Why Do Fools Fall in Love, playing one of the three wives of singer Frankie Lymon. The following year, she appeared in stoner comedy horror Idle Hands, and Teaching Mrs. Tingle with Helen Mirren. In 2000, she starred alongside Blair Underwood in the short-lived CBS medical drama, City of Angels.

In 2001, Fox played Lucille Slocumb in Kingdom Come, a comedy-drama starring LL Cool J, Jada Pinkett Smith, and Whoopi Goldberg. That same year, she was the lead in the romantic comedy Two Can Play That Game, and had a supporting role in the independent comedy-drama Little Secrets. In 2002, she starred alongside Miguel A. Núñez Jr. in Juwanna Mann and Cuba Gooding Jr. in Boat Trip. In 2003, Quentin Tarantino cast her as Vernita Green in his two-part martial arts film Kill Bill.

=== 2004–2019 ===
From 2004 to 2006, Fox co-produced and starred as FBI special agent Nicole Scott in the Lifetime television crime drama series Missing. She received the NAACP Image Award for Outstanding Actress in a Drama Series for her role in 2006. During this time, Fox produced and played the leading roles in several films, including Motives, The Salon, Getting Played, and Three Can Play That Game. From 2007 to 2009, she had a recurring role in the HBO comedy series Curb Your Enthusiasm, as the mother of a family displaced by a hurricane and taken in by Larry and Cheryl.

Fox was a judge on The WB's talent show The Starlet. She participated in the third season of ABC's hit television show, Dancing with the Stars, but was voted off after the fourth week. In 2009, Fox served as celebrity spokesperson for the then newly revamped Psychic Friends Network. After receiving backlash for her involvement with the network, Fox denied any involvement with the company, despite having filmed a commercial and promo video which had already gone to air. She hosted her own VH1 reality series Glam God with Vivica A. Fox (2008), TV Land's The Cougar (2009), and Lifetime's Prank My Mom (2012). She was also a contestant on The Apprentice in 2015.

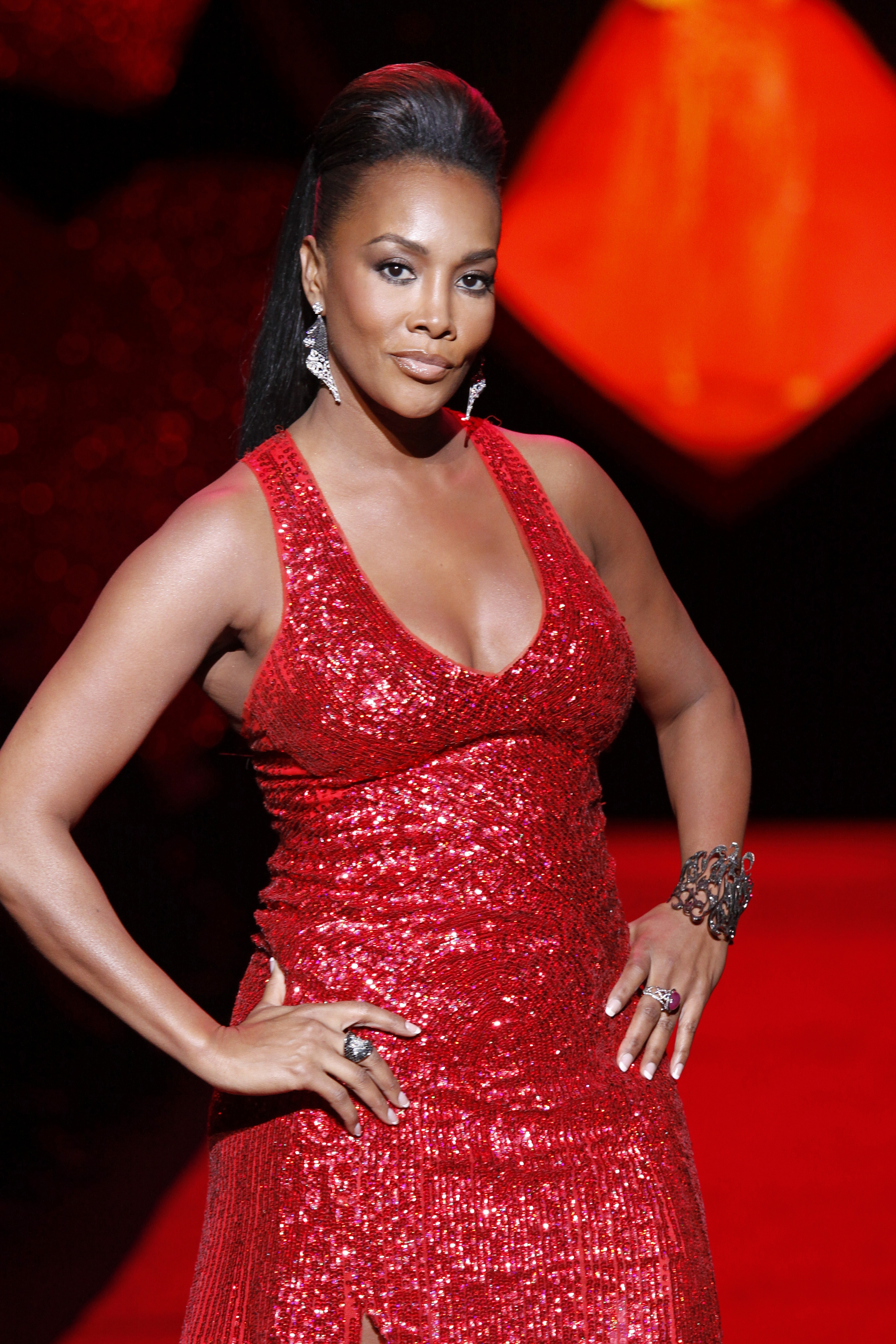
Fox at The Heart Truth in 2009

In the late 2000s and 2010s, Fox had supporting roles in films poorly received by critics, such as The Hard Corps (2006) alongside Jean-Claude Van Damme, Kickin' It Old Skool (2007) starring Jamie Kennedy, and Private Valentine: Blonde & Dangerous (2008) with Jessica Simpson. On television, she had guest starring roles on Law & Order, Drop Dead Diva, Melissa & Joey, Femme Fatales, and Raising Hope. As a regular, Fox starred in the syndicated sitcom Mr. Box Office alongside Bill Bellamy and Jon Lovitz.

In 2012, she acted in the Nigerian action drama film Black November, starring Mickey Rourke, Kim Basinger, Akon, and Wyclef Jean. In 2013, Fox landed a part in the Christian sports drama, Home Run. The film had a limited release on April 19, in the United States and has grossed over $2.8 million. On the review aggregator Rotten Tomatoes, the film received 45% positive reviews from 11 critics. Fox also gave her voice to the direct-to-DVD animated film Scooby-Doo! Stage Fright. and the animated series "Scooby Doo! Mystery Incorporated". In October 2013, she had a supporting role in the Christmas film So This Is Christmas, alongside Eric Roberts. In 2014, she participated in the acclaimed parodic TV film Sharknado 2: The Second One. Later that year, Fox starred in Mercenaries, alongside Kristanna Loken, Brigitte Nielsen, Cynthia Rothrock, Zoë Bell, and Nicole Bilderback.

In 2015, she was cast as Cookie Lyon's sister for the second season of Empire. She was a recurring cast member as of the second season and was promoted to series regular for its sixth and final season. She acted in the comedy-drama, Chocolate City, alongside Robert Ri'chard, Michael Jai White, Carmen Electra. In the United States, the film was released in a limited release and through video on demand on May 22, 2015. Freestyle Releasing handled the theatrical release, with Paramount Home Entertainment handling the video on demand and home media release of the film. The film debuted on BET on June 10, 2015. Fox was in the crime action thriller The Good, the Bad, and the Dead, starring Johnny Messner, Dolph Lundgren, Danny Trejo, and Michael Paré. She also appeared in the film True to the Game, based on Teri Woods' novel of the same name.

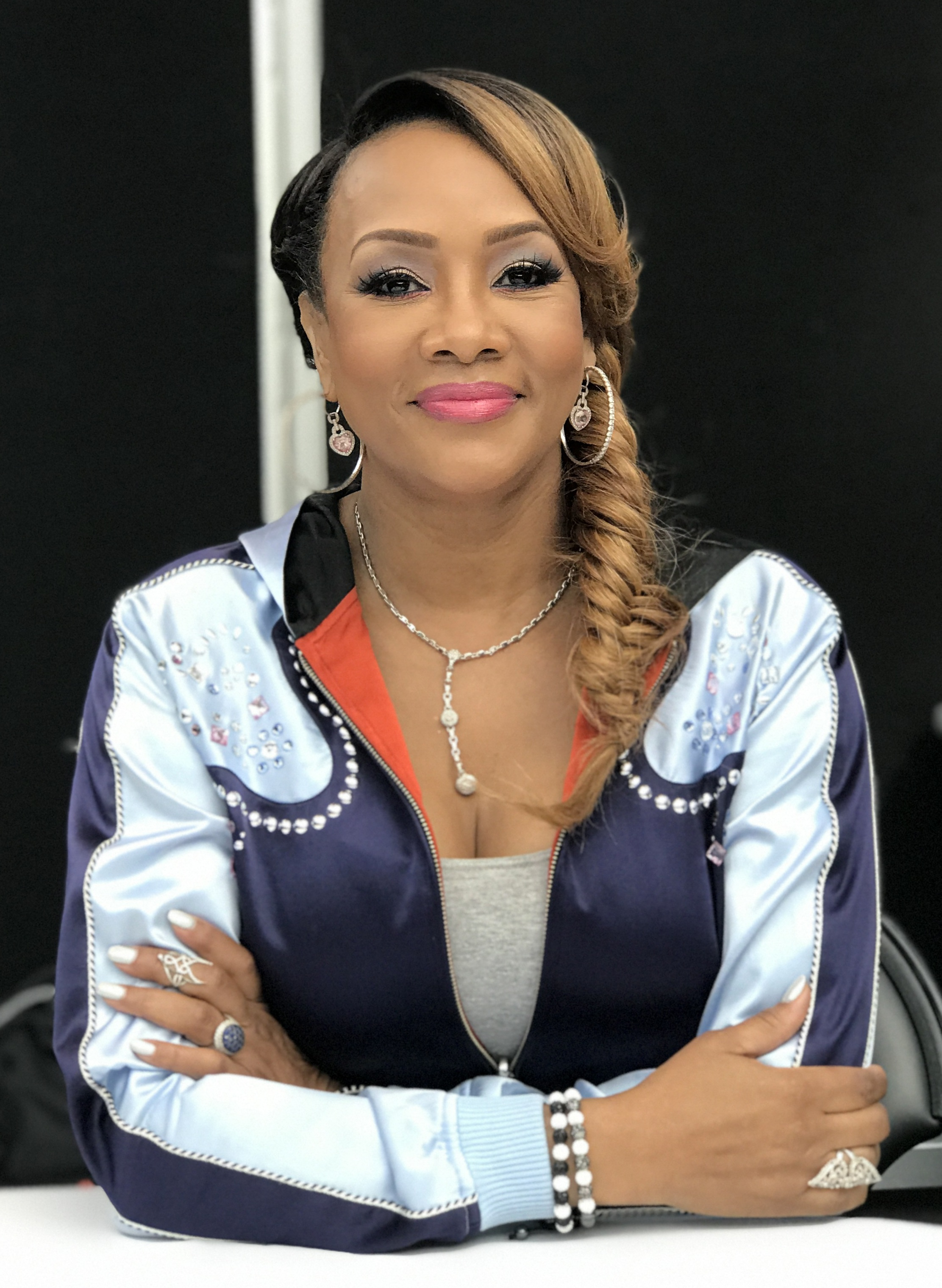
Fox at the 2017 New York Comic Con

Fox reprised her Independence Day role in Roland Emmerich's Independence Day: Resurgence, released on June 24, 2016. That same year, it was announced that she would portray the president of the United States in the science fiction film "Crossbreed", making her the first African-American woman to portray the role in a feature film. She was also cast in the television film The Wrong Roommate.

On January 4, 2017, Lifetime launched the premiere of her new venture "Vivica's Black Magic" which was an exotic male review. During this time, she had a supporting role in the film Chocolate City: Vegas Strip starring Robert Ri'chard, Michael Jai White, Mekhi Phifer, Ginuwine, and Melanie Brown. The film was made available on Netflix on August 12, 2017. Fox appeared as Cheer Goddess in the film Bring It On: Worldwide Cheersmack. She also starred in the TV biopic Bobbi Kristina, based on the life of Whitney Houston's daughter Bobbi Kristina. Fox acted in the independent drama, Jason's Letter. The film made its premiere on June 11, 2017, at the Schwartz Center for the Arts in Dover.

In 2018, the actress released a book. Vivica's Every Day I'm Hustling (St. Martin's Press, 2018) is a "part memoir, part inspirational" book that focuses on her career and relationships. The same year, she appeared in the television film The Last Sharknado: It's About Time. She was hired to host the TV talk show Face the Truth on CBS, which lasted only one season. She also had a role in the erotic romantic thriller Kinky. The film was released in the United States on October 12, 2018, by Patriot Pictures. In December 2018, she appeared in two Christmas films: Christmas with a View, starring Patrick Duffy and A Wedding for Christmas.

In 2019, Fox starred in several David DeCoteau television films, including The Wrong Stepmother, The Wrong Boy Next Door, The Wrong Mommy, The Wrong Tutor and The Wrong Cheerleader. She appeared as Dr. Angela Foster in the TV series The Bay, and starred in the drama film Fire And Rain. She also acted in two Christmas themed television films: 2nd Chance for Christmas and Christmas Matchmakers, starring Dorian Gregory.

=== 2020–present ===
In 2020, Fox starred in the film Arkansas, alongside Liam Hemsworth, John Malkovich, and Vince Vaughn. That same year, she starred in the film Hooking Up, and had a role in the film True to the Game 2 starring Tamar Braxton, which was released on April 10. She also starred in the film Rev, released in May 2020.

Fox later competed in season six of The Masked Singer as "Mother Nature". She was the second to be eliminated during the two-night premiere, alongside Dwight Howard as "Octopus" and Toni Braxton as "Pufferfish". Her unmasking occurred at the beginning of the second part as the first part ended in a cliffhanger.

In 2021, Fox appeared in the independent drama film Secret Society, and was the lead actress in the horror film Aquarium of the Dead. During this time, she was also cast in the 12 to Midnight and Keeping Up with the Joneses television series. In 2022, Fox had a role in the thriller movie Secret Society 2. She co-starred with Tom Arnold and Elisabeth Röhm in the drama A Marriage Made In Heaven, and had a part in Bobcat Moretti with rapper Coolio. Later that year, Fox appeared in several Christmas TV movies: A Cozy Christmas Inn (co-starring Jodie Sweetin), Holiday Hideaway, Dognapped: Hound for the Holidays, and A New Diva's Christmas Carol (co-starring Ashanti and Mel B). She also had a role in the critically acclaimed crime story Twisted Vines. Fox directed the BET+ original movie First Lady of BMF: The Tonesa Welch Story, which premiered on October 5, 2023.

In January 2024, Fox joined the cast of Bosco, a biographical drama thriller film based on the life of convict Quawntay Adams. The movie was released by Peacock on February 2, 2024. Fox then acted alongside Tisha Campbell, Jasmine Guy, Kyla Pratt and Jamie Foxx in Not Another Church Movie. The movie, which parodies the films of Tyler Perry, was released in the United States on May 10, 2024. She also played the leading role in the 2024 drama film, The Lost Holliday. She later starred in Night of the Living Dead, a 2026 horror reimagining of George A. Romero's 1968 film of the same name. In April 2026, she returned to The Young and the Restless for a multi-episode arc alongside Shemar Moore.

In 2026, Fox starred in the Southern Gothic revenge comedy thriller film Is God Is, directed by Aleshea Harris, playing the role of Ruby the God. The film received positive reviews from critics. Later that year, she was cast alongside Vanessa Williams, Jenifer Lewis and Whoopi Goldberg in the Tasha Smith-directed comedy-drama film, Women Like Us. The movie, which was produced by Barack Obama and Michelle Obama, has yet to be released.

== Personal life ==
In December 1998, Fox married singer Christopher "Sixx-Nine" Harvest. The couple divorced in 2002. Fox briefly dated rapper 50 Cent in 2003. In November 2011, Fox and club promoter Omar "Slimm" White broke off their 10-month engagement.

She was inducted as an honorary member of the Zeta Phi Beta sorority in November 2020.

== Acting credits ==
During her career, Fox has appeared in more than 250 feature films, made-for-television movies, and television series. She has produced more than 40 feature and television films. She began her career appearing on a regular basis on soap operas Days of Our Lives (1988), Generations (1989–1991), and The Young and the Restless (1994–1995), and the sitcom Out All Night (1992–1993). Her big break came in 1996 with roles in box–office hits Independence Day and Set It Off. She received MTV Movie Award for Best Breakthrough Performance and Saturn Award for Best Supporting Actress nominations for Independence Day. She has also received nominations for nine NAACP Image Awards, including three times in the category Outstanding Actress in a Motion Picture for Soul Food, Two Can Play That Game and Juwanna Mann. For directing the 2023 biographical crime drama film, First Lady of BMF: The Tonesa Welch Story, Fox received an NAACP Image Award nomination for Outstanding Directing in a Television Movie or Special.

- Independence Day (1996) as Jasmine Dubrow
- Set It Off (1996) as Frankie
- Soul Food (1997) as Maxine
- Why Do Fools Fall in Love (1998) as Elizabeth 'Mickey' Waters
- Two Can Play That Game (2001) as Shante Smith
- Kill Bill: Volume 1 (2003) as Vernita Green
- Kill Bill: Volume 2 (2004) as Vernita Green
- Chocolate City (2015) as Katherine McCoy
- Independence Day: Resurgence (2016) as Jasmine Hiller
- Arkansas (2020) as 'Her"
- Is God Is (2026) as Ruby the God

== Accolades ==
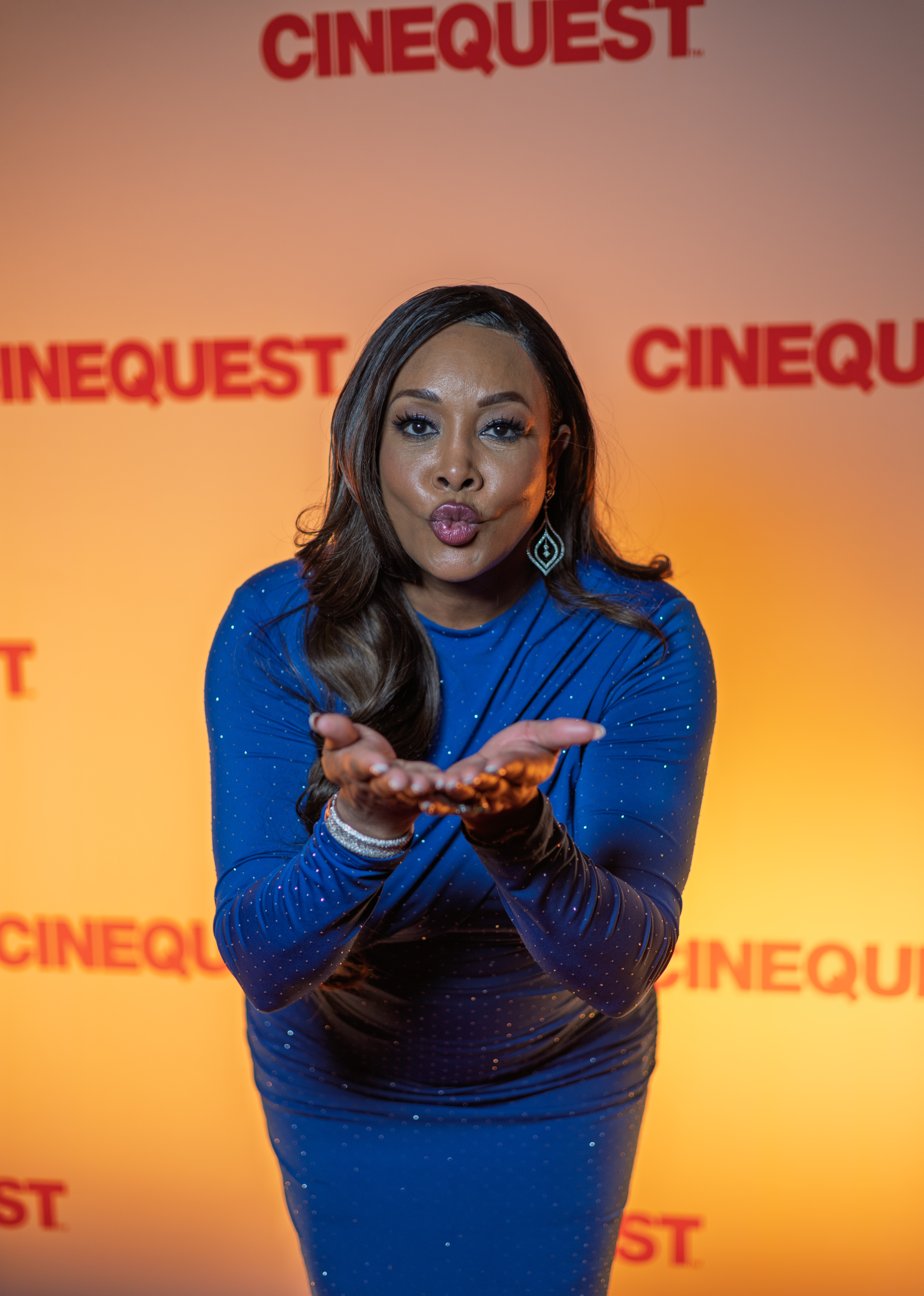
Fox at the Cinequest Film Festival in 2026

Year	Awards	Category	Recipient	Outcome
1997	MTV Movie Awards	MTV Movie Award for Best Kiss shared with Will Smith	Independence Day	Won
1997	MTV Movie Awards	MTV Movie Award for Best Breakthrough Performance	Vivica A. Fox	Nominated
1997	Syfy	Universe Reader's Choice Award for Best Supporting Actress in a Genre Motion Picture	Vivica A. Fox	Won
1997	Saturn Awards	Saturn Award for Best Supporting Actress	Independence Day	Nominated
1998	MTV Movie Awards	MTV Movie Award for Best Female Performance	Soul Food	Nominated
1998	American Black Film Festival	Acapulco Black Film Festival Award for Best Actress	Vivica A. Fox	Won
1998	NAACP Image Award	NAACP Image Award for Outstanding Actress in a Motion Picture	Vivica A. Fox	Nominated
1999	NAACP Image Award	NAACP Image Award for Outstanding Actress in a Comedy Series	Getting Personal	Nominated
2002	BET Awards	BET Award for Best Actress	Vivica A. Fox	Nominated
2002	NAACP Image Award	NAACP Image Award for Outstanding Supporting Actress in a Motion Picture	Kingdom Come	Nominated
2002	Black Reel Award	Black Reel Award for Best Actress	Two Can Play That Game	Nominated
2004	BET Awards	BET Award for Best Actress	Kill Bill: Volume 1	Nominated
2004	Black Reel Awards	Black Reel Award for Best Supporting Actress	Kill Bill: Volume 1	Nominated
2005	Black Reel Awards	Black Reel Award for Outstanding Independent Film	Motives	Nominated
2005	NAACP Image Award	NAACP Image Award for Outstanding Actress in a Drama Series	1-800-Missing	Nominated
2006	NAACP Image Award	NAACP Image Award for Outstanding Actress in a Drama Series	1-800-Missing	Won
2008	NAACP Image Award	NAACP Image Award for Outstanding Supporting Actress in a Comedy Series	Curb Your Enthusiasm	Nominated
2016	CinemaCon	CinemaCon Award for Best Ensemble	Independence Day: Resurgence	Won
2022	Orlando Film Festival	Best Lead Actress	Bobcat Moretti	Nominated
2024	NAACP Image Award	Outstanding Directing in a Television Movie or Special	First Lady of BMF: The Tonesa Welch Story	Nominated
