= Chocolate City (film) =

- Theatrical release poster
- Directed by: Jean-Claude La Marre
- Written by: Jean-Claude La Marre
- Produced by: Robert Aaronson; Jessie L. Levostre; Michael Mendelsohn; Melanie Levostre; Eurika Pratts; Jim Steele
- Starring: Robert Ri'chard; Tyson Beckford; DeRay Davis; Imani Hakim; Darren Dewitt Henson; Carmen Electra; Ginuwine; Vivica A. Fox; Michael Jai White
- Cinematography: Vladimir Van Maule
- Edited by: Yvan Gauthier
- Production companies: Nu-Lite Entertainment; Patriot Pictures
- Distributed by: Freestyle Releasing (United States); Paramount Home Media Distribution; BET Networks
- Release date: May 22, 2015
- Country: United States
- Language: English
- Box office: $212,662

Chocolate City is a 2015 American comedy-drama film directed and written by filmmaker Jean-Claude La Marre. The film stars Robert Ri'chard, Michael Jai White, Carmen Electra and Vivica A. Fox. The film centers on a struggling college student whose life changes when he tries amateur night at a male strip club. This film was shot in Inglewood, California and was released in a limited release and through video on demand outlets on May 22, 2015.

A 2017 sequel named Chocolate City: Vegas Strip is available on Netflix.

== Synopsis ==
Michael (Robert Ri'chard) a college student takes a job as an exotic dancer to make ends meet, and as the money rolls in, he has to deal with the attention of the female club goers while hiding his job from his mother (Vivica A. Fox) and girlfriend (Imani Hakim).

== Cast ==
- Robert Ri'chard as Michael McCoy
- Vivica Fox as Katherine McCoy
- DeRay Davis as Chris McCoy
- Michael Jai White as Princeton
- Tyson Beckford as Adrian "Rude Boy"
- Darrin Dewitt Henson as Magnus
- Jean-Claude La Marre as Pastor Jones
- Ginuwine as Pharaoh
- Ernest Thomas as Diner Manager
- Carmen Electra as DJ
- Eurika Pratts as DeDe
- Andrea Kelly as Dance Instructor
- Xavier Declie as Professor Lyons
- Michael Bolwaire as Bolo
- Gibert Salvidar as Slayer
- Danny Mitchell as Jamaika
- Brian Massey as Addiction
- Aaron McNeal as Smoove
- Carlito Olivero as Raphael
- Maliah Michel as Kandi
- Candice Craig as Cynthia
- Johann J. Jean as Bartender
- Cydney Davis as Sister Beatrice
- Trae Ireland as Wade
- Imani Hakim as Carmen
- Jah Shams as D. Ice

== Production ==
The film is a black version of the 2012 male stripper movie, Magic Mike, starring Channing Tatum. According to the film's director, Jean-Claude La Marre, "There was one glaring omission in Magic Mike, and that was people of color. We figured that was a missed opportunity for them and we jumped on it."

== Release ==
In the United States, the film was released in a limited release and through video on demand on May 22, 2015. Freestyle Releasing handled the theatrical release with Paramount Home Entertainment handling the video on demand and home media release of the film. The film also debuted on BET on June 10, 2015. It had 991,000 viewers in its first airing.

== Marketing ==
On April 24, 2015, the official trailer and poster were released.

== Sequel ==
A sequel named Chocolate City: Vegas was released to BET on July 1, 2017. On August 12, 2017, it was added to Netflix behind the name Chocolate City: Vegas Strip.

== See also ==
- Australia's Thunder from Down Under
- Back on the Strip
- Chippendales
- Dreamboys
- List of black films of the 2010s
- Magic Mike
