= Kinky (film) =

- Theatrical release poster
- Directed by: Jean-Claude La Marre
- Written by: Jean-Claude La Marre
- Produced by: Jean-Claude La Marre; Jessie L. Levostre; Eurika Pratts; Michael Mendelsohn; Dawn Richard
- Starring: Robert Ri'chard; Dawn Richard; Darrin Dewitt Henson; Jean-Claude La Marre; Eurika Pratts; Gary Dourdan; Obba Babatundé; Vivica A. Fox
- Cinematography: Vladimir Van Maule
- Edited by: Juan Soto
- Music by: Shantez "Chi City" Jackson
- Production companies: Nu-Lite Entertainment; Patriot Pictures
- Distributed by: Patriot Pictures
- Release date: October 12, 2018 (United States)
- Running time: 70 minutes
- Country: United States
- Language: English
- Budget: $3.5 million

Kinky is a 2018 American erotic romantic thriller directed, written and produced by Jean-Claude La Marre. The film stars Robert Ri'chard, Dawn Richard, Gary Dourdan, and Vivica A. Fox. The film was released in the United States on October 12, 2018, by Patriot Pictures.

== Cast ==
- Dawn Richard as Dr. Joyce Carmichael
- Robert Ri'chard as Tyrone Bernard
- Vivica A. Fox as Marshalla
- Gary Dourdan as Greenland
- Marklen Kennedy as Mysterious Man
- Darrin Dewitt Henson as Bradley
- Willie Taylor as Ramone
- Obba Babatundé as Mr. Bernard
- Freda Payne as Mrs. Bernard
- Eurika Pratts as Vanessa
- Michael Bolwaire as a trainer
- Jean-Claude La Marre as Dr. Richardson

== Reception ==
Austin critic Korey Coleman of Double Toasted lambasted the film, criticizing the storytelling, characters, and ending. He went on to call it one of the worst movies that he has ever seen. Movie Nation gave Kinky 2 stars out of five, comparing it to 50 Shades of Grey, but for Black people. They said the movie has "Bad acting by pretty people, awesome sex scenes but not a lot of S&M wear, What is this, 'Fifty Shades of Ebony?'"
