= Robert Ri'chard =

American actor (born 1983)

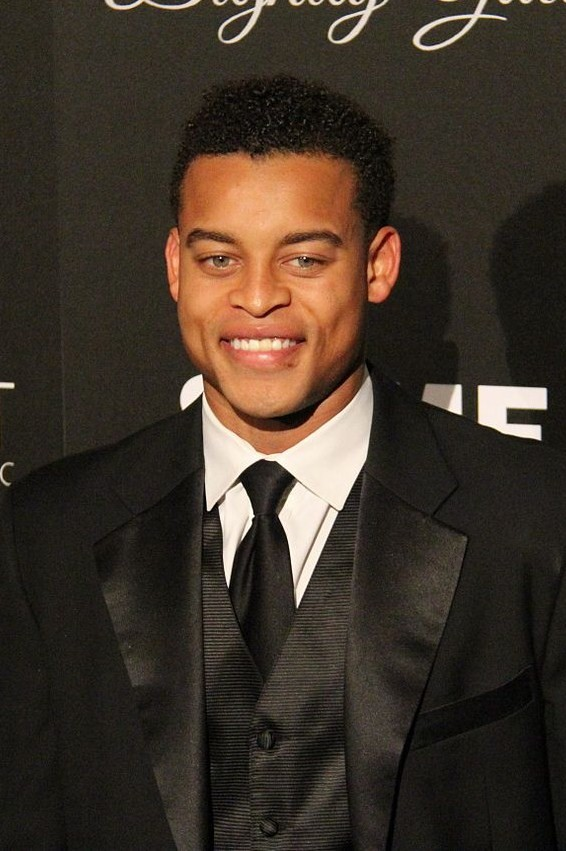
- Ri'chard at the Inaugural Dignity Gala on October 18, 2013
- Born: Robert Andrew Ri'chard; January 7, 1983 (age 43); Los Angeles, California, U.S.
- Occupation: Actor
- Years active: 1993–present

Robert Andrew Ri'chard (born January 7, 1983) is an American actor, known for his roles as Bobby Walker on the Nickelodeon sitcom Cousin Skeeter (1998–2002), and as Arnaz Ballard on the UPN sitcom One on One (2001–2006). He received Daytime Emmy Award for Outstanding Performer in Children's Programming for performance in the made-for-television movie In His Father's Shoes (1998), and NAACP Image Award nomination for Outstanding Youth Actor/Actress for the 1999 teen drama film, Light It Up.

Ri'chard starred in the sports drama film Coach Carter and the horror film, House of Wax in 2005. He later played the lead in the stripper drama film Chocolate City (2015) and its sequel, Chocolate City: Vegas Strip (2017), and in the erotic drama film, Kinky (2018).

== Early life ==
Ri'chard was born in Los Angeles, California. He is of Louisiana Creole descent. He attended Palms Middle School in Los Angeles, California.

== Career ==
Ri'chard made his acting debut in 1993 when he made an appearance on the short lived ABC sitcom Where I live. In 1997, he starred in the television special, In His Father's Shoes, which earned him the 1998 Daytime Emmy Award for Outstanding Performer in a Children's Special. Ri'chard later starred in the Nickelodeon sitcom Cousin Skeeter. He also made a few appearances as himself on the hit Nickelodeon game show, Figure It Out. He played Samuel on Touched by an Angel, a troubled teen whose brother is in prison for shooting a man. His breakout role was in the TV adaptation of Anne Rice's novel, The Feast of All Saints, where he played the young Marcel who becomes a man within society. He appeared in the movie Light It Up along with R&B star Usher. Ri'chard has guest starred on many hit shows such as Boston Public, NCIS, CSI: Miami, CSI: NY, My Wife and Kids, Hangin' with Mr. Cooper, and The Jamie Foxx Show. In 2000, he starred in the Disney Channel TV movie Alley Cats Strike. He became popular in 2001 when he got the role of Arnaz Ballard on the UPN hit sitcom One on One alongside Flex Alexander and Kyla Pratt. That role was the most significant of his television roles. He continued to play the role until the show ended in 2006.

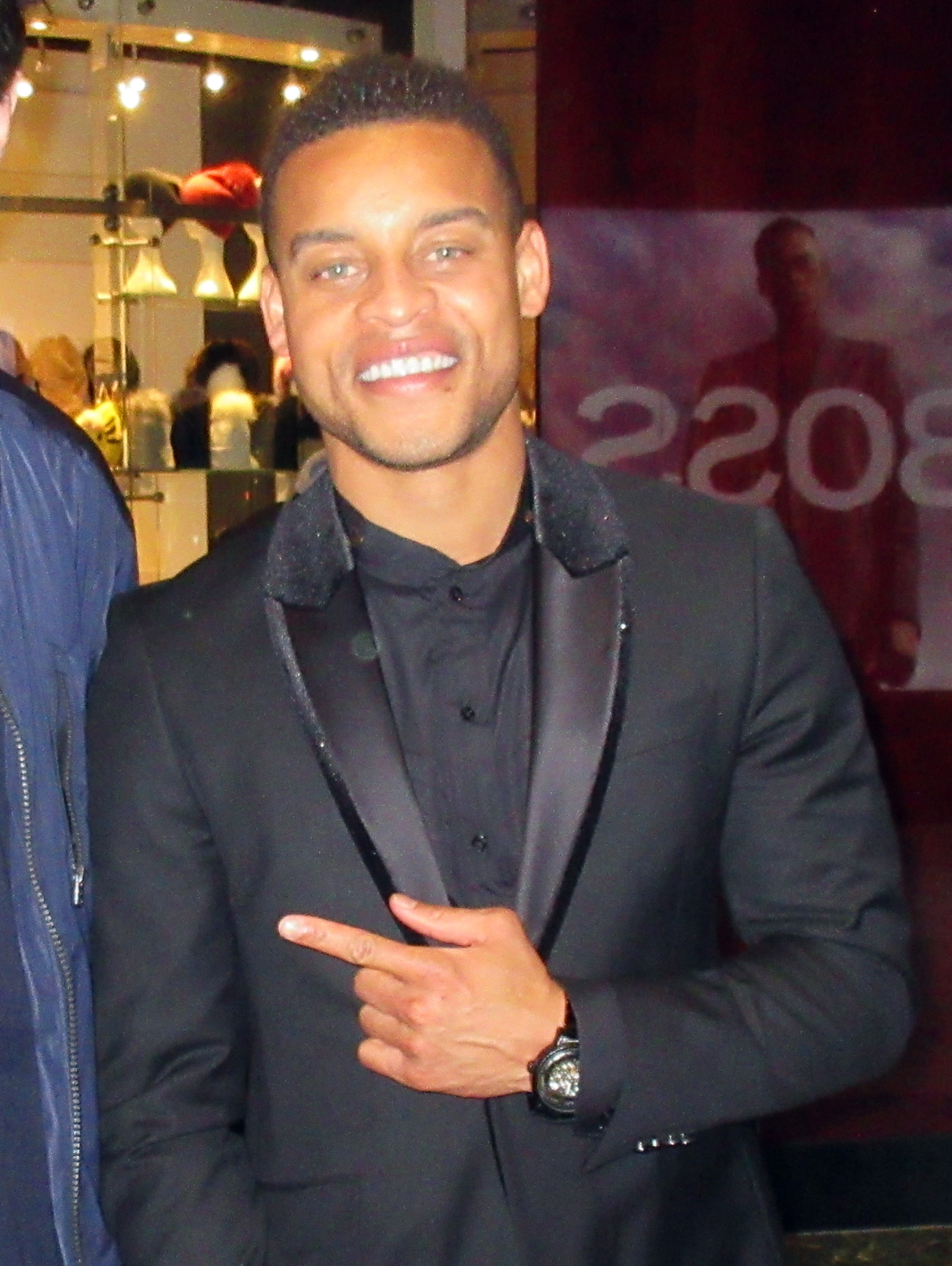
Ri'chard in 2019

Ri'chard appeared in films Coach Carter and House of Wax in 2005. From 2006 to 2007 he had a recurring role in the CW series Veronica Mars and from 2009 to 2010 in the TBS sitcom Meet the Browns as Derek Porter, a buffoonish frat student who lived next door to Brown Meadows. He debuted in season 3 as a recurring character, and in the fourth season, was promoted to a main character. Ri'chard was set to star in a series entitled Eight Days a Week, starring Christina Milian and Mario Lopez on the CW Television Network during the fall 2007 season, but it was canceled due to the 2007 Writers Strike before airing. On November 16, 2011, it was announced that Robert Ri'chard was cast as Jamie in the CW series The Vampire Diaries.

In 2015, Ri’chard played stripper in the comedy-drama film, Chocolate City. He later returned to its sequel, Chocolate City: Vegas Strip (2017). In 2018 he starred in the erotic film, Kinky. He later appeared in films Bolden (2019), Alone (2020) and Sweetwater (2023). On television, he appeared in Lucifer and iZombie. He had the recurring roles during the final season of Fox soap opera, Empire, and the Amazon comedy series, Harlem alongside Cousin Skeeter co-star, Meagan Good.

== Filmography ==
=== Film ===
Year	Title	Role	Notes
1997	In His Father's Shoes	Clay Crosby	TV movie Daytime Emmy Award for Outstanding Performer in Children's Programming; Nominated — Young Artist Award for Best Performance in a TV Movie / Pilot / Mini-Series: Leading Young Actor
1999	Our Friend, Martin	Miles (voice)	Video
1999	Light It Up	Zacharias 'Ziggy' Malone	Nominated — NAACP Image Award for Outstanding Youth Actor/Actress
2000	Alley Cats Strike	Todd McLemore	TV movie Nominated — Young Artist Award for Best Performance in a TV Movie (Comedy) - Leading Young Actor
2000	New Kids on the Planet	Bobby Walker	Cousin Skeeter TV movie
2001	The Feast of All Saints	Marcel	TV movie
2002	Who's Your Daddy?	Murphy	Video
2005	Coach Carter	Damien Carter	
2005	House of Wax	Blake	
2005	P.N.O.K.	Pvt. Battle	Short
2007	The Comebacks	Aseel Tare	
2007	Eight Days a Week	Daniel 'Sarge' Sargent	TV movie
2010	Louis	Baquet	
2011	5th & Alameda	Troy	
2012	A Beautiful Soul	Christ Scott	
2013	Pastor Shirley	Jason	
2014	Sweat Harder	Athlete 7	Short
2015	Chocolate City	Michael McCoy	
2015	The Man in 3B	Benny	
2016	Bad Dad Rehab	Tristan	TV movie
2017	Secondhand Love	-	Short
2017	Chocolate City: Vegas Strip	Michael McCoy	
2017	Vagabonds	Skeeter Johnson	Short
2018	Kinky	Darrin Bernard	
2018	Throwback Holiday	Aaron Tucker	
2019	Bolden	George Baquet	
2019	The Naughty List	Zane	TV movie
2020	My Brother's Keeper	Donnie	
2020	Alone	Brandon	
2021	Real Talk	Robert Allen	
2021	The Fight That Never Ends	John 'Jay' Hunter	TV movie
2023	Sweetwater	Pop	
2023	Big Boss	TJ	
2023	Queen of Hearts	Justin	Tubi Original
2023	Vicious Affair	Kenneth Hastings	Tubi Original
2024	RSVP	Maurice Wright	BET+ Original
2025	TKO	Sean Sr.	Tubi Original
2025	A Demon's Revenge	Nestor	BET+ Original
2026	Not My Dog	Sammy	
TBA	Paradies 3		Post—production

=== Television ===
Year	Title	Role	Notes
1993	Where I Live	Brian	Episode: "Married... with Children"
1996	Hangin' with Mr. Cooper	Gary	Episode: "Breaking Up Is Hard to Do"
1996	Nash Bridges	Leo	Episode: "Leo's Big Score"
1996	Touched by an Angel	Samuel Dixon	Episode: "Sins of the Father"
1996–98	Nickelodeon Sports Theater with Shaquille O'Neal	Luke Williams / Troy Davis	Episode: "4 Points" & "First Time"
1997	Crisis Center	Dwayne	Episode: "Shots"
1997	Promised Land	Hank	Episode: "Stealing Home: Part 1 & 2"
1998	The Jamie Foxx Show	Bruce	Episode: "The Afterschool Special" & "We Got No Game"
1999	All That	Himself	Episode: "All That Live! (100th episode)"
1998–2001	Cousin Skeeter	Bobby Walker	Main cast Nominated — Young Artist Award for Best Performance in a TV Comedy Series - Leading Young Actor (1999–2001)
2000	Once and Again	Jared	Recurring cast: Season 1
2001	Boston Public	Student	Episode: "Chapter Fourteen"
2001	My Wife and Kids	Tommy	Episode: "Grassy Knoll"
2001	Touched by an Angel	Alex Wilson	Episode: "Band of Angels"
2001–06	One on One	Arnaz Ballard	Main cast
2005	CSI: Miami	Tobey Hollins	Episode: "48 Hours to Life"
2006–07	Veronica Mars	Mason	Recurring cast: Season 3
2009	NCIS	Seaman Richard Zell	Episode: "South by Southwest"
2009–10	Meet the Browns	Derek Porter	Recurring cast: Season 3-4
2012	The Vampire Diaries	Jamie	Recurring cast: Season 3
2012	King Bachelor's Pad	Howard	Episode: "Last Wish"
2012	The Client List	Alex	Episode: "Acting Up"
2013	CSI: NY	Ray Griffin	Episode: "Today Is Life"
2014	Hungry	Jayson	Episode: "How to Marry a Millionaire"
2015	427	Dion	Episode: "Pilot"
2016	Lucifer	Josh Bryant	Episode: "Lucifer, Stay. Good Devil."
2017	iZombie	Finn Vincible	Episode: "Eat a Knievel"
2017–21	The Rich and the Ruthless	Max Barringer	Main cast
2020	Empire	Julian	Recurring cast: Season 6
2021	Harlem	Shawn	Recurring cast
