= List of Cousin Skeeter episodes =

Cousin Skeeter, an American television series that originally aired on Nickelodeon. It premiered on September 1, 1998 and ended on November 2, 2002, with a total of 52 episodes over the course of 3 seasons.

== Series overview ==
Season	Episodes	Originally released	
Season	Episodes	First released	Last released
1	20	September 1, 1998	April 1, 1999
2	23	August 17, 1999	July 8, 2000
3	9	January 14, 2001	November 2, 2002

== Episodes ==
=== Season 1 (1998–99) ===
No. overall	No. in season	Title	Directed by	Written by	Original release date
1	1	"A Family Thing"	Chris Koch	Story by : Phil Beauman & Alonzo Brown & Brian Robbins; Teleplay by : Phil Beauman	September 1, 1998
Bobby has moved to a new apartment in New York from Los Angeles where his wacky cousin Skeeter also moves in with him to tutor him.
2	2	"Skeeter's Toy Story"	Brian Robbins	Phil Beauman	September 3, 1998
Bobby is desperate to impress Nina.
3	3	"Air Skeeter"	Jonathan Winfrey	Mystro Clark & Steve McFeely	September 8, 1998
Skeeter comes out of retirement to break the school basketball team's losing streak.
4	4	"My Dinner Without Andre"	Jonathan Winfrey	Todd Jones & Richey Jones	September 10, 1998
Believing that he is helping Bobby, Skeeter tells Nina that Bobby is a gourmet chef.
5	5	"Tyrannosaurus Wrecked"	Allison Liddi	Bill Marich & Rich Ross	September 15, 1998
On a school trip to the natural history museum Bobby slips on a sandwich.
6	6	"Cirque Du Skeeter"	Virgil L. Fabian	Phil Beauman & Larry Rudolph	September 17, 1998
Skeeter bumps into his old friend Ziggy.
7	7	"Mo' Skeeter Blues"	Shaquille O'Neal	Nick Cannon	September 24, 1998
Skeeter accidentally destroys the tape of a music single.
8	8	"Skeeter's House of Style"	Unknown	Unknown	September 29, 1998
Nina's fashion show is in danger of failing.
9	9	"Doctor Skeeter"	Lev L. Spiro	Phil Beauman & Alonzo Brown	October 8, 1998
Bobby and Nina are assigned to the hospital for Career Day.
10	10	"Blast From the Past"	Topper Carew	Stuart Alexander	October 10, 1998
Skeeter's old girlfriend is back in town, and she's determined to see if Skeeter still longs for her.
11	11	"Skeeter's Help-a-Thon"	Unknown	Unknown	October 15, 1998
Skeeter volunteers Bobby to play the piano at Nina's grandmother's birthday party.
12	12	"Haunted House of Blues"	Topper Carew	David Kirkwood	October 27, 1998
Skeeter, Bobby and Nina set out to photograph the ghost that haunts their building.
13	13	"The Bother of the Bride"	Unknown	Unknown	November 12, 1998
Skeeter gives Bobby's mother's wedding dress to the Salvation Army.
14	14	"Apocalypse Skeeter"	Unknown	Unknown	December 1, 1998
Bobby and Skeeter and a load of kids from school go away to camp. Whilst on camp they oversleep and miss the start of a game of 'capture the flag' against a rival camp. With the rest of their team captured it's up to them to rescue them AND capture the other team's flag.
15	15	"Miracle on 32nd Skeet"	Topper Carew	Bill Marich & Rich Ross	December 17, 1998
Bobby is asked to give an acceptance speech for his dad.
16	16	"Skeeter Stays"	Unknown	Unknown	March 16, 1999
Skeeter overhears that he is going to be sent to military school. He is set on cleaning the house to impress Andre and Vanessa so they will allow him to stay with them in New York.
17	17	"Skeeter's Suplex"	William Bindley	Phil Beauman	March 18, 1999
'Stone Cold' Skeeter schedules a wrestling match.
18	18	"Choir Boyz"	Virgil L. Fabian	Phil Beauman	March 25, 1999
Nina needs help with the church choir, so Skeeter volunteers Bobby to perform a solo, however Bobby can't sing.
19	19	"Sideshow Skeeter"	Jonathan Winfrey	Todd Jones & Richey Jones & Mystro Clark	March 30, 1999
Skeeter and Bobby accidentally break Andre's miniature television.
20	20	"The Good Stuff"	Unknown	Unknown	April 1, 1999
Skeeter and Bobby are contestants on the trivia game show "The Good Stuff.

=== Season 2 (1999–2000) ===
No. overall	No. in season	Title	Directed by	Written by	Original release date
21	1	"Be Like Skeeter"	Unknown	Unknown	August 17, 1999
With Bobby convinced he lacks the right qualities to get into student government.
22	2	"Dirty Laundry"	Jonathan Winfrey	Cheryl Alu	August 19, 1999
When Bobby can't get any students to read his school paper.
23	3	"The Bicycle Thief"	Anson Williams	Mason Gordon & Nick Cannon	August 24, 1999
When Nina and Bobby's bikes are stolen, the kids take it upon themselves to capture the thieves.
24	4	"Take Me Out to the Ballgame"	Virgil L. Fabian	Brad Kaaya	August 26, 1999
Skeeter and Bobby ditch school to attend a Yankee game.
25	5	"Jezebel"	Lev L. Spiro	Phil Beauman and Jerry Perzigian	August 31, 1999
A new girl in school catches the eye of both Bobby and Skeeter. Lisa "Left Eye" Lopes of TLC (group) guest stars.
26	6	"Out of Control"	Virgil L. Fabian	Phil Beauman and Jerry Perzigian	September 2, 1999
On a class outing, the bus driver passes out and Bobby and Skeeter are forced to bring a speeding bus in safely.
27	7	"Not So Great Outdoors"	Anson Williams	Brian Kahn	September 7, 1999
When a comfortable family camping trip backfires, Skeeter, Bobby and the others are forced to rough it.
28	8	"The Volcano"	Anson Williams	Jerry Perzigian	September 9, 1999
Skeeter does everything he can to get rid of a pimple before a big date.
29	9	"Two Men and a Baby Pig"	Lev L. Spiro	Cheryl Alu	September 14, 1999
Bobby, Skeeter and Nina discover a piglet.
30	10	"Unchained"	Michael Grossman	Mark E. Corry	September 16, 1999
Bobby ignores a chain letter and suffers a streak of bad luck.
31	11	"Hoo, I'm Wild Wild West"	Lev L. Spiro	Jonathan Green & Gabe Miller and Cheryl Alu	September 18, 1999
32	12	"Hoo, I'm Wild Wild West"	Lev L. Spiro	Jonathan Green & Gabe Miller and Cheryl Alu	September 18, 1999
Skeeter, Bobby and Nina join Kenan & Kel on a ranch vacation. Skeeter and Kenan rescue Kel and Nina and capture Zeke Mulligan who happens to be a diabolical ranch owner.
33	13	"Bowled Over"	Jonathan Winfrey	Mason Gordon & Nick Cannon	October 7, 1999
Skeeter inadvertently injures Andre just before an important father/son bowling tournament.
34	14	"The Candidate"	Virgil Fabian	Jerry Perzigian	October 19, 1999
Nina is disgusted by Bobby's campaign for school president, so she decides to run.
35	15	"Where's Grandma?"	Unknown	Unknown	February 1, 2000
Vanessa sends Bobby, Skeeter and Nina to pick up her grandmother at the train station.
36	16	"April Foolish"	Lev L. Spiro	Mark E. Corry	April 1, 2000
Skeeter renounces his April Fool's Day pranks.
37	17	"Sugar Daddy"	Unknown	Unknown	May 4, 2000
Skeeter, Bobby and Nina must learn the lessons of parenting.
38	18	"Car Wash"	Unknown	Unknown	May 13, 2000
At a school fundraising car wash, Bobby, Nina and Skeeter wreck Nina's dad's prized Cadillac.
39	19	"The Feminine Ms. Skeet"	Virgil L. Fabian	Chris Alberghini & Mike Chessler	May 13, 2000
Skeeter, pretending to be a girl, gets into a popular all-female singing group.
40	20	"Gym Dandy"	Topper Carew	Brad Kaaya	June 1, 2000
Skeeter and Andre are both determined to get in shape for a family photograph.
41	21	"New Kids on the Planet"	Lev L. Spiro	Story by : Jerry Perzigian; Teleplay by : Cheryl Alu & Brad Kaaya	July 8, 2000
42	22	"New Kids on the Planet"	Lev L. Spiro	Story by : Jerry Perzigian; Teleplay by : Cheryl Alu & Brad Kaaya	July 8, 2000
43	23	"New Kids on the Planet"	Lev L. Spiro	Story by : Jerry Perzigian; Teleplay by : Cheryl Alu & Brad Kaaya	July 8, 2000
Skeeter, Bobby, Nina, and their new neighbor, Nicole go to a space academy in Florida. Skeeter spends his time tormenting the commanding officer and flirting with Nicole. In order to impress Nicole, Skeeter sneaks the kids into a space shuttle which has the four crash-land on the planet, Tunica. But the four find out that the Tunican plot is to take over Earth by replacing every teenager with a Tunican clone. Skeeter's personality gets the kids out of jail and into battle with the evil Tunicans. Eventually, everybody makes it back to Earth safe, but nobody believes Skeeter after the other three memories were erased by the Men in Black as Skeeter looked away saving his memory of the whole adventure.

=== Season 3 (2001–02) ===
No. overall	No. in season	Title	Directed by	Written by	Original release date
44	1	"Little Mr. Big Man on Campus"	Tim Hill	Brad Kaaya	January 14, 2001
The first day of high school works out well for Skeeter, despite his encounters with the school bully.
45	2	"Bellboyz in the Hood"	Michael Negrin	Andrew Kreisberg	January 21, 2001
Skeeter and Bobby get jobs as bellboys.
46	3	"Coop Dreams"	Lev L. Spiro	Mark E.Corry	January 28, 2001
Bobby urges Skeeter to move out after a science project goes awry.
47	4	"Radio Daze"	Carl Goldstein	Cheryl Alu	February 4, 2001
Skeeter becomes a pop music sensation.
48	5	"Night of the Iguana"	Steve Dubin	Jerry Perzigian	February 11, 2001
Nina is convinced that Bobby ignores him. She decides to make him jealous on Nicole's advice. Unfortunately, Bobby decides to do the same on his side on the advice of Skeeter.
49	6	"Trading Places"	Michael Grossman	Jerry Perzigian	September 21, 2002
Nina finds a doll with magical powers. She has the gift of exchanging the personalities who are in front of them. Bobby uses it on Nina and Skeeter.
50	7	"Letter Loose"	Unknown	Unknown	September 28, 2002
Skeeter and Bobby try to retrieve a nasty e-mail they accidentally sent to Vanessa's boss.
51	8	"The Music Man"	Michael Grossman	Brad Kaaya	October 12, 2002
Skeeter signs to a record label in hopes of becoming famous, but soon discovers that the producer does not have his best interests at heart.
52	9	"The Prince and the Putter"	Steve Dubin	Cheryl Alu	November 2, 2002
The Walker family participates in a golf tournament. Skeeter goes away to buy candy and meets Olivier, his perfect double who happens to be the son of a billionaire. Olivier proposes to Skeeter to exchange places with one another for the tournament.
