= Chocolate City: Vegas Strip =

- Promotional poster
- Directed by: Jean-Claude La Marre
- Written by: Jean-Claude La Marre
- Produced by: Ernest Wallis; Jean-Claude La Marre; Julius Wright; Jen Robinson; Robert R'ichard; Eurika Pratts
- Starring: Michael Jai White; Robert Ri'chard; Michael Bolwaire; Ginuwine; Mekhi Phifer; Darrin Henson; Mel B; Vivica A. Fox
- Cinematography: Rene Ohashi
- Edited by: Robert Larkin
- Music by: Lyle Workman
- Production companies: Nu-Lite Entertainment; Patriot Pictures
- Distributed by: Netflix
- Release date: August 12, 2017 (Netflix)
- Running time: 89 mn
- Country: United States
- Language: English

Chocolate City: Vegas Strip is a 2017 American comedy-drama film directed and written by filmmaker Jean-Claude La Marre. The film stars Michael Jai White, Robert Ri'chard, Michael Bolwaire, Ginuwine, Mekhi Phifer, Darrin Henson, Mel B and Vivica A. Fox. It is the sequel to the 2015 film Chocolate City.

On August 12, 2017, the film became available on Netflix. A sequel, Chocolate City 3: Live Tour was released by Quiver Distribution in 2021.

== Synopsis ==
The Chocolate City dancers go to Las Vegas in hopes of winning $500 000 dollars during a prestigious competition. This money would be used to save the nightclub 'Chocolate City' from foreclosure.

== Cast ==
- Michael Jai White as Princeton
- Robert Ri'chard as Michael McCoy
- Michael Bolwaire as Bolo
- Ginuwine as Pharaoh
- Mekhi Phifer as Best Valentine
- Darrin Henson as Magnus
- Mel B as Brandy
- Vivica A. Fox as Katherine McCoy
- Marc John Jefferies as Carlton Jones
- Imani Hakim as Carmen
- Nikki Leigh as Ms Daisy
- Ernest Thomas as Mr Williams
- Baron Davis as Jacob the Comedian
- Kathleen Robertson as Tess
- K.D. Aubert as Wanda
- Kiersey Clemons as Odessa
- Gabriel Casseus as Tone
- Trae Ireland as Deacon Wade Nixon
- Jean-Claude La Marre as Pastor Jones
- Keith Carlos as Seduktion
- Adele Givens as GrandMaw
- Jaymes Vaughan as Adonis
- Lil Yachty as himself
- Don Lemon as himself

== Release ==
On August 12, 2017, the movie became available on Netflix under the title Chocolate City: Vegas Strip.
