= Erica Hubbard =

American actress and model (born 1979)

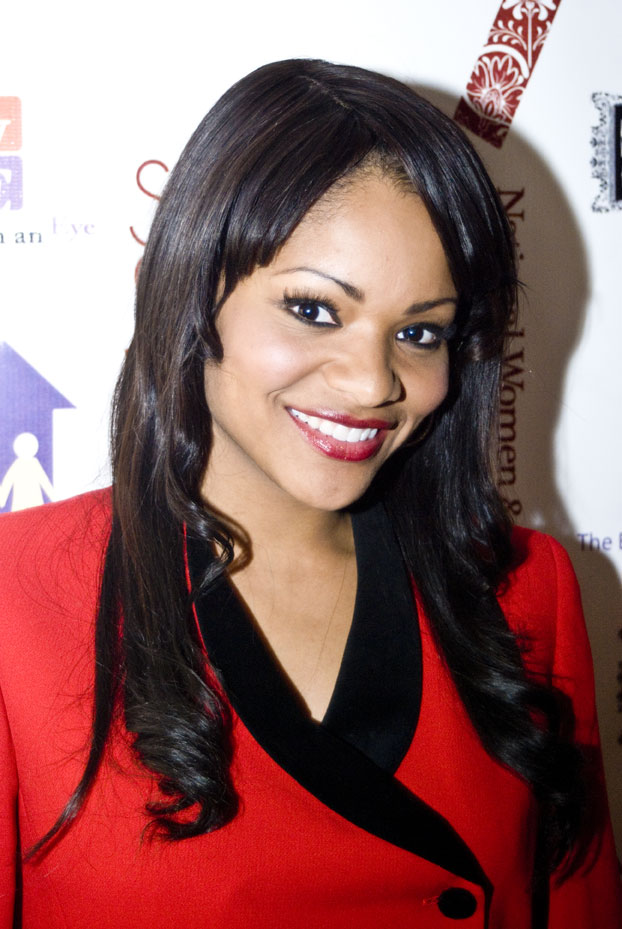
- Hubbard in March 2011.
- Born: Chicago, Illinois, U.S.
- Education: Columbia College Chicago
- Years active: 1988–present
- Website: https://twitter.com/EricaHubbard

Erica Hubbard (born January 2, 1979) is an American actress and model. Hubbard grew up in Chicago. Hubbard is best known for her roles as Kiana Anderson in the 2006 film Akeelah and the Bee, Cassandra "Cassie" Sutton on the ABC Family series Lincoln Heights (2007–09) and Kita Whitmore on Let's Stay Together (2011–14) on the BET network. She is also the voice of Abbey for the TV series The Replacements. She created "The Erica Hubbard Foundation" to help youth in at-risk communities.

== Career ==
Hubbard appeared in magazine ads for Noxzema in 1997.

Hubbard started out modeling with Ford. Ford's modeling agency told Hubbard that she needed an agency to assist with television and film.

After graduating college, she landed her first television show entitled Up 'N Running: a teen show that focused on educating kids on a variety of different topics of interest, from education to horseback riding, to playing hockey or learning how to make ice cream. The show aired on WPWR, a UPN affiliate in Chicago. By the time the third season had started airing, she had already won a Regional Emmy award for hosting the show and earned a Service To America Award from the National Association of Broadcasters.

Hubbard has appeared in the films Simon Says, Akeelah and the Bee, The Sisterhood of the Traveling Pants, Save the Last Dance, A Cinderella Story, as well as numerous television series including Lincoln Heights, CSI: Miami, and Everybody Hates Chris. She also had a voice role in the video game "The Walking Dead"..

== Personal life ==
Hubbard was born and raised on the south side of Chicago. She attended Columbia College in Chicago where she majored in Broadcast Journalism and minored in Theater and earned her Bachelor of Arts degree in three years.

Hubbard founded her own nonprofit called the 'Erica Hubbard Foundation'. Hubbard was inspired to create it because of her personal experience growing up on the South Side of Chicago, where she was exposed to a lot of violence. The Erica Hubbard Foundation sees Hubbard visiting community centers, high schools, elementary schools, and churches and talking to children. "I encourage them to stay in school and stay off of the streets" says Hubbard. Hubbard continued her pursuit in giving back by making an appearance on pop soul RnB artist DeAna Fai's podcast DeAna Fai presents Kings and Queens of Entertainment Reunion Recap and Giveback; along with other celebrities supporting the National Breast Cancer Foundation (United States) and the American Heart Association.

Hubbard was married for thirteen years, she divorced around 2019. Hubbard has three children. Her eldest daughter is Olympic hopeful Kyla Robinson Hubbard. Her youngest daughter was born in 2012.

== Filmography ==
=== Film ===
Year	Title	Role	Notes
1999	Light It Up	Girl One	
2001	Save the Last Dance	Jasmine	
2003	Banged Up	Sable	
2004	A Cinderella Story	Madison	
2005	The Sisterhood of the Traveling Pants	Diana	
2006	Akeelah and the Bee	Kiana Anderson	
2006	Simon Says	Sommer	
2009	Someone Heard My Cry	Ashley	Short
2011	The Ideal Husband	Michelle	Television film
2011	Nurse Jackée	Chloe	Short
2012	Dysfunctional Friends	Catrece	
2013	School of Hard Knocks	Trina	Video
2013	The Love Letter	Jasmine	Television film
2013	Forbidden Woman	Vanessa Young	
2014	Black Coffee	Mita	
2014	Internal Affairs I.A.D.	-	Television film
2015	My Favorite Five	Sybil	
2015	72 Hours	Lanae	
2015	Fear Files	Kelisia Waters	Television film
2018	No More Mr Nice Guy	Keisha Smalls	
2018	The Other Side	Gemma	
2018	Falling In Love Again	Tyra	
2019	Fall Girls	Tyra	
2019	Perfectly Single	Edith	
2019	Professor Mack	Ayesha Johnson	
2019	Just a Friend	Wanda	
2021	A New Kind of Woman	Latavia	
2022	Hyde Park	Aja Davies	
2023	The Assistant	Tiyana	

=== Television ===
Year	Title	Role	Notes
1997	ER	Girl on El	Episode: "One More for the Road"
1999	Early Edition	Groupie Girl	Episode: "Number One with a Bullet"
1999–2001	Up'N Running	Herself/host	
2000	Undressed	Jenny	Episode: "Code of Sex"
2002	Popstars	Herself	Episode: "Showtime"
2002	Undeclared	Gloria	Episode: "The Day After"
2002	The Zeta Project	Lead Bully	Voice, episode: "Lost and Found"
2002	Boston Public	Cindy	2 episodes
2002	Do Over	Student Body President	Episode: "Joel Strikes Back"
2002	MADtv	Double Dutch Rope Jumper #1	2 episodes
2003	Judging Amy	Teresa the Hooker	Episode: "Picture of Perfect"
2004	Joan of Arcadia	Karen Casper	Episode: "Double Dutch"
2005	CSI: Miami	Tina Saunders	Episode: "Prey"
2005	Everybody Hates Chris	Yvette	Episode: "Everybody Hates the Babysitter"
2006–07	The Replacements	Abbey Willson	Voice, recurring role
2007–09	Lincoln Heights	Cassandra 'Cassie' Sutton	Main Cast
2010	Cold Case	Wanda Johnson	Episode: "Shattered"
2011–14	Let's Stay Together	Kita Whitmore	Main Cast
2013	Awkward Black Girl	Lucinda	2 episodes
2017	Chicago Med	Dina Morris	Episode: "Cold Front"
2025	The Family Business: New Orleans	Ernestine	Series regular

=== Podcast ===
Year	Title	Role	Notes
2021	DeAna Fai presents Kings and Queens of Entertainment Reunion Recap & Giveback!	Self	Episode: 13
