= List of hip-hop record labels =

This is a list of notable hip-hop record labels:

== 0–9 ==
- 4th & Broadway
- 75 Ark
- 300 Entertainment
- 1017 Brick Squad Records
- 50/50innertainment

== A ==
- Aftermath Entertainment
- Aggro Berlin
- Ahdasee Records
- Allido Records
- Amalgam Digital
- Amaru Entertainment
- American King Music
- Anti-
- Anticon
- Arista
- Asylum Records
- ATIC Records
- Atlantic Records
- Avatar Records

== B ==
- B-Boy Records
- B.O.S.S.
- Babygrande Records
- Bad Boy Records
- Barely Breaking Even
- Battle Axe Records
- Beluga Heights Records
- BGOV
- Big Beat Records
- Big Dada
- Big Hit Entertainment
- Big Up Entertainment
- Billion Headz Music Group
- Black Butter Records
- Black Jays
- Black Kapital Records
- The Black Wall Street Records
- Blacksmith Records
- Block Entertainment
- Bloodline Records
- BME Recordings
- BMG
- Body Head Entertainment
- Brick Squad Monopoly
- Bruc Records
- Bungalo Records
- BTNH Worldwide
- Boy Better Know

== C ==
- Cactus Jack Records
- Capitol Hill Music
- Cash Money Records
- Cashville Records
- Celestial Recordings
- Chamillitary Entertainment
- Chopper City Records
- Cold Chillin' Records
- Collective Music Group
- ColliPark Music
- Columbia Records
- Cross Movement Records
- Czar Entertainment

== D ==
- D-Block Records
- Dame Dash Music Group
- Dawn Raid Entertainment
- Death Row Records
- Def Jam Recordings
- Def Jam South
- Definitive Jux
- Delicious Vinyl
- Deluxe Records
- Dented Records
- Derrty Ent.
- Desert Storm
- Diplomat Records
- Disturbing tha Peace
- Doggystyle Records
- Doomtree
- D.P.G. Recordz
- Dragon Mob Records
- Dream Chasers Records
- Dreamville Records
- Duck Down Records
- Dunk Yer Funk Records

== E ==
- Eastern Conference Records
- EG Records
- Elefant Traks
- Elektra Entertainment
- Enjoy Records
- Epic Records
- Epidemic Records
- Ersguterjunge

== F ==
- FFRR Records
- Finger Lickin' Records
- First Priority Music
- Fitamin Un
- Flipmode Entertainment
- Fondle 'Em Records
- Fort Knocks Entertainment
- Four Music
- Freebandz
- Fresh Records
- Frontline Records
- Fueled by Ramen
- Full Surface Records
- Funk Volume

== G ==
- G-Funk Entertainment
- G-Unit Records
- Gangsta Advisory Records
- Gee Street Records
- Geffen Records
- Get Low Recordz
- The Goldmind Inc.
- GOOD Music
- Godzilla Entertainment
- Goliath Records
- Good Hands Records
- Grade A Productions
- Grand Hustle Records
- Greenhouse Music
- Griselda Records

== H ==
- Hefty Records
- Hidden Beach Recordings
- Hieroglyphics Imperium Recordings
- Hollywood BASIC
- Hoo-Bangin' Records
- Humble Beast
- Hydra Entertainment
- Hypnotize Minds

== I ==
- Ice Age Entertainment
- Ill Flava Records
- Ill Will Records
- Imperial Records
- Infinity Records
- Internet Money
- Interscope Records
- Iron Fist Records
- It's A Wonderful World Music Group
- The Inc. Records

== J ==
- J Records
- JDC Records
- Jive Records
- Joe & Joey Records

== K ==
- Kennis Music
- Kon Live Distribution
- Konvict Muzik
- Kross Over Entertainment

== L ==
- LaFace Records
- Legendary Music
- Legit Ballin'
- Lench Mob Records
- Lex Records
- Lil Debbie Records
- Loud Records
- Low Life Records
- Luke Records
- Love Renaissance

== M ==
- M3 Records
- Machete Music
- Mango Records
- Mashin' Duck Records
- Maybach Music Group
- Mello Music Group
- Merck Records
- Millennium Records
- Mo' Wax
- Moda Records
- Mosley Music Group
- Motown Records
- Mush Records
- Music from the Corner
- Music of Life
- Mo Thugs Records

== N ==
- Nature Sounds
- Nervous Records
- Never Broke Again
- Next Plateau Entertainment
- Ninja Tune
- No Limit Records
- Noo Trybe Records

== O ==
- Obese Records
- ODA/Capalot Records
- OFWGKTA
- Ogopa DJs
- One Records
- Open Bar Entertainment
- Opium (record label)
- OVO Sound
- Oxygen Music Works

== P ==
- Peanuts & Corn Records
- Poe Boy Entertainment
- Polo Grounds Music
- Positive Tone
- Priority Records
- Prism Records
- Profile Records
- Project Blowed
- Prosto Records
- Psycho+Logical-Records
- Psychopathic Records
- Purple Ribbon Records

== Q ==
- QN5
- Quannum Projects
- Queen Bee Entertainment
- Quality Control Music

== R ==
- Racetrack Records
- Rap-A-Lot Records
- Rawkus Records
- Re-Up Records
- Reach Records
- Relentless Records
- Remedy Records
- Rhymesayers Entertainment
- Rhythm King
- Roc Nation
- Roc-A-Fella Records
- Roc-La-Familia
- Ropeadope Records
- Rowdy Records
- Rude Boy Records
- RuffNation Records
- Ruff Ryders Entertainment
- Russell Simmons Music Group
- Ruthless Records

== S ==
- S. Carter Records
- Select Records
- Selfmade Records
- Shady Records
- Sho'nuff Records
- Sleeping Bag Records
- Slip-N-Slide Records
- Smoke-A-Lot Records
- So So Def Recordings
- SoBe Entertainment
- SRC Records
- Stacks on Deck Entertainment
- Star Trak Entertainment
- Stones Throw Records
- Storch Music Company
- Strange Famous Records
- Strange Music
- Street Records Corporation
- Street Sounds (Record Label)
- Streetsweepers Entertainment
- Suave House Records
- Sub Verse Music
- Suburban Noize Records
- Sugar Hill Records
- Swishahouse

== T ==
- Take Fo' Records
- Tan Cressida
- Taylor Gang Records
- Tayster and Rojac Records
- Tee Productions
- Ten12 Records
- Terror Squad Entertainment
- Thizz Entertainment
- Thump Records
- Tommy Boy Records
- Top Dawg Entertainment
- Trend Records
- Tres Records
- Trill Entertainment
- Tru 'Dat' Entertainment
- Tuff City Records
- Thug Line Records

== U ==
- UGK Records
- The Ultimate Group
- Uncensored Records
- Uncle Howie Records
- Unda K9 Records
- Undercover Prodigy
- Unidisc Music Inc.
- UpFront Records
- Uptown Records
- URBNET Records
- UTP Records

== V ==
- Villain Entertainment
- Visionary Music Group

== W ==
- Wall of Sound
- Web Entertainment
- Wild Pitch Records
- Winley Records
- Wu-Tang Records

== X ==
- XO Records

== Y ==
- YG Entertainment
- Young Money Entertainment
- YSL Records

== Z ==
- Zomba Recording
- ZYX Music

== See also ==
- List of record labels
- List of electronic music record labels
- List of independent UK record labels
