= List of Los Angeles rappers =

This is a list of notable hip hop music artists that are from Los Angeles, California.

== A ==
- Ab-Soul
- Aceyalone
- Afroman
- Ak'Sent
- Akwid
- Alchemist
- Tha Alkaholiks
- Aloe Blacc
- Anderson .Paak
- Arabian Prince

== B ==
- B-Real
- Bad Azz
- Big Fase 100
- Big Syke
- Bino Rideaux
- Black Eyed Peas
- Blueface
- Blu
- Boo-Yaa T.R.I.B.E.
- Brownside
- Busdriver
- Blxst

== C ==
- Captain Murphy
- Captain Rapp
- Casey Veggies
- Chali 2na
- clipping.
- Coolio
- Cozz
- Crooked I
- Cypress Hill
- Charizma

== D ==
- The D.O.C.
- Damu Ridas
- Daz Dillinger
- Deuce
- Dilated Peoples
- DJ Mustard
- DJ Pooh
- DJ Quik
- DJ Yella
- Doja Cat
- Dom Kennedy
- Domo Genesis
- Drakeo the Ruler
- Dr. Dre
- Dresta
- Dudley Perkins
- Dumbfoundead

== E ==
- Earl Sweatshirt
- Tha Eastsidaz
- Eazy-E
- EC
- Egyptian Lover
- Eligh
- Emcee N.I.C.E.
- Evidence
- Exile

== F ==
- Fatlip
- Fergie
- Freestyle Fellowship
- Frank Ocean
- Fenix Flexin

== G ==
- The Game
- Giant Panda
- Gift of Gab
- The Grouch
- Guerilla Black
- 03 Greedo

== H ==
- Haiku d'Etat
- Hodgy Beats
- Hollywood Undead
- Hopsin

== I ==
- Ice Cube
- Ice-T
- Imani

== J ==
- J-Ro
- Jay Rock
- Joey Fatts
- Johnny 3 Tears
- Jurassic 5
- Justin Warfield

== K ==
- Kendrick Lamar
- Kid Frost
- Kid Ink
- King Tee
- Knoc-turn'al
- Kokane
- Kurupt
- Kyle

== L ==
- L.A. Symphony
- Lil Eazy-E
- Lootpack

== M ==
- Mack 10
- Madlib
- Maylay
- MC Eiht
- MC Ren
- MC Trouble
- Mellow Man Ace
- Mike G
- Mike Shinoda
- Murs
- Myka 9
- Mila J

== N ==
- Nipsey Hussle
- Nichkhun
- Nocando
- N.W.A

== O ==
- Oh No
- O.T. Genasis
- OhGeesy
- Overdoz

== P ==
- Pac Div
- People Under the Stairs
- The Pharcyde
- Pigeon John
- Problem
- Psycho Realm
- Psychosiz

== R ==
- Ras Kass
- RBX
- Remble
- RJMrLA
- Roddy Ricch
- Rucci

== S ==
- Schoolboy Q
- Sen Dog
- Skeme
- Slimkid3
- Snoop Dogg
- South Central Cartel
- Spider Loc
- SwizZz
- Shoreline Mafia

== T ==
- Tupac Shakur
- Thurzday
- Too Short
- Tweedy Bird Loc
- Tyga
- Tyler, the Creator
- Ty Dolla Sign

== U ==
- Ugly Duckling
- Uncle Jamm's Army
- U-N-I

== V ==
- Vince Staples

== W ==
- Warren G
- WC
- Westside Boogie

== X ==
- Xzibit

== Y ==
- YG

== Z ==
- Zack de la Rocha

== See also ==
- Lists of hip-hop musicians
- Rappers from California
- West Coast hip-hop
