= Trav Walls =

American rapper

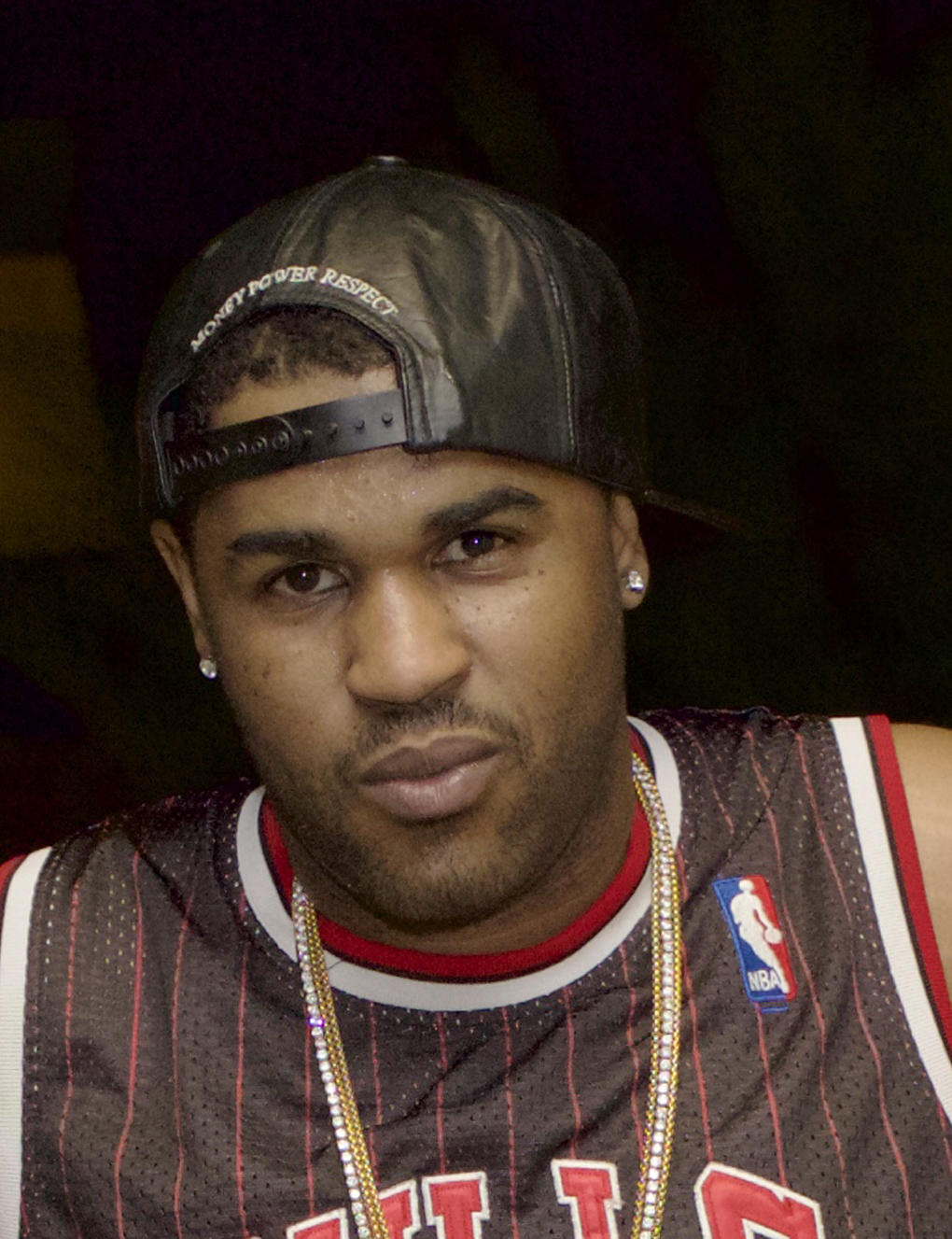
- Trav Walls

Background information
- Born: Travis Walls; April 5, 1988 (age 38); Los Angeles County, California, U.S.
- Occupations: Recording Artist; Rapper; Hip Hop Artist; Vocalist
- Years active: 2010–present
- Label: Independent
- Website: travwalls.com

Travis Walls (born April 5, 1988), professionally known as Trav Walls, is an American Recording Artist, songwriter, and rapper from Los Angeles California. He is also the nephew of former NFL Legend & Actor Timothy Brown (actor). As a child Walls was relocated to Chino Hills, California, a suburb of Los Angeles located in the southwestern corner of San Bernardino County, California. It was there that Walls would find his love for music. Between the years of 2012 and 2013 he released 2 indie mixtapes with an exclusive deal through Mixtapetorrent.com which featured production by Clams Casino (musician), Track Bangas, Lex Luger (record producer) & more. The spread of the mixtape sparked his career and gave him a lot of local support as well as an industry buzz.

== Early life and musical influences ==
Travis Walls, Professionally known as Trav Walls was born on April 5, 1988, in Gardena Memorial Hospital located in the south western region of Los Angeles County. After growing up in Los Angeles his family decided it was best for him to move with his Grandparents in Chino Hills, California. Due to bad influences and the growing rise of crime and violence in Los Angeles his grandparents felt it was the best move for him at the time. Walls developed his love for music while attending Oak Ridge Elementary School in Chino Hills where he learned how to play the Piano and Clarinet.

Later his grandmother would reveal to him that his uncle Timothy Brown (actor) was an actor on the 20th Century Fox Television hit TV Series M*A*S*H (TV series) and several other hit movies and TV shows throughout the 1970s. Walls then began to take up acting while in school and would participate in school plays. His Grandmother would eventually teach him about the music business and reveal to him that she was the production manager behind the 1978 release The "Selma" Album released by Warner Music Group.

Another major influence in Trav Walls life west coast Legend and Hip Hop Pioneer Joe Cooley of the duo Rodney-O & Joe Cooley. Rodney-O & Joe Cooley were best known for their hit singles "You Don’t Hear Me Tho’ and "Humps for The Blvd". Cooley would visit the family home often. It was then that Cooley would critique and guide Walls and help him develop his first raps. He would also give walls a breakdown of west coast rap history and express the importance of its tradition.

== Music career ==
Between the years of 2012 and 2015 Trav Walls released indie mixtapes through various mixtape outlets. The mixtapes featured singles with production by Clams Casino (musician), Track Bangas, Lex Luger (record producer), Young Chop and other producers. The spread of the mixtape and singles sparked his career and gave him a lot of local support as well as an industry buzz. While promoting his releases Walls felt that he needed to grow a more organic following leading him to make the decision to tour and perform for following 2 years.

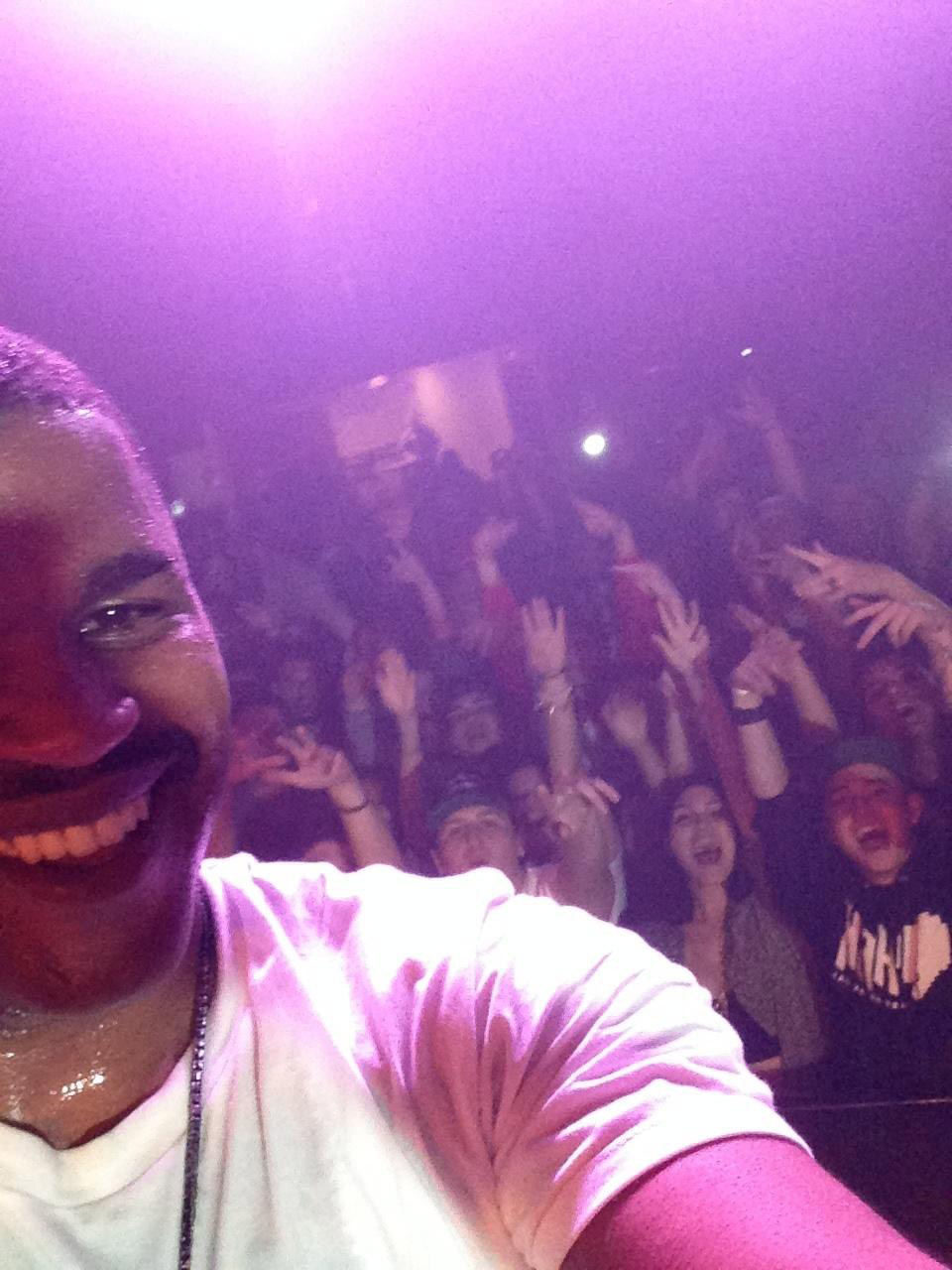
Trav Walls Live at Show taking picture of Fans

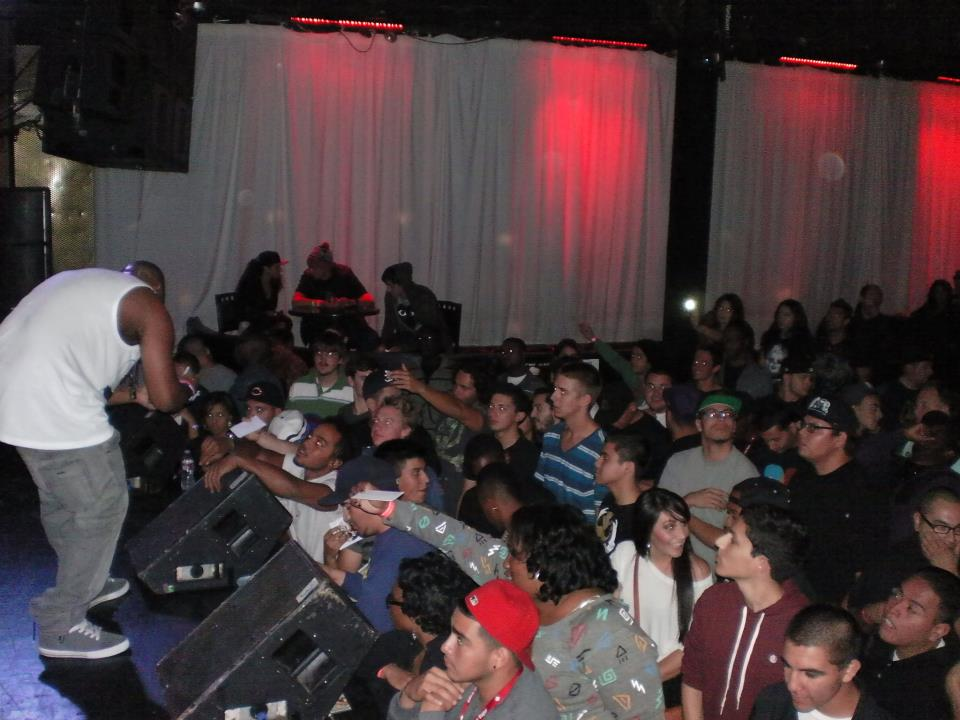
Trav Walls signing autographs during show

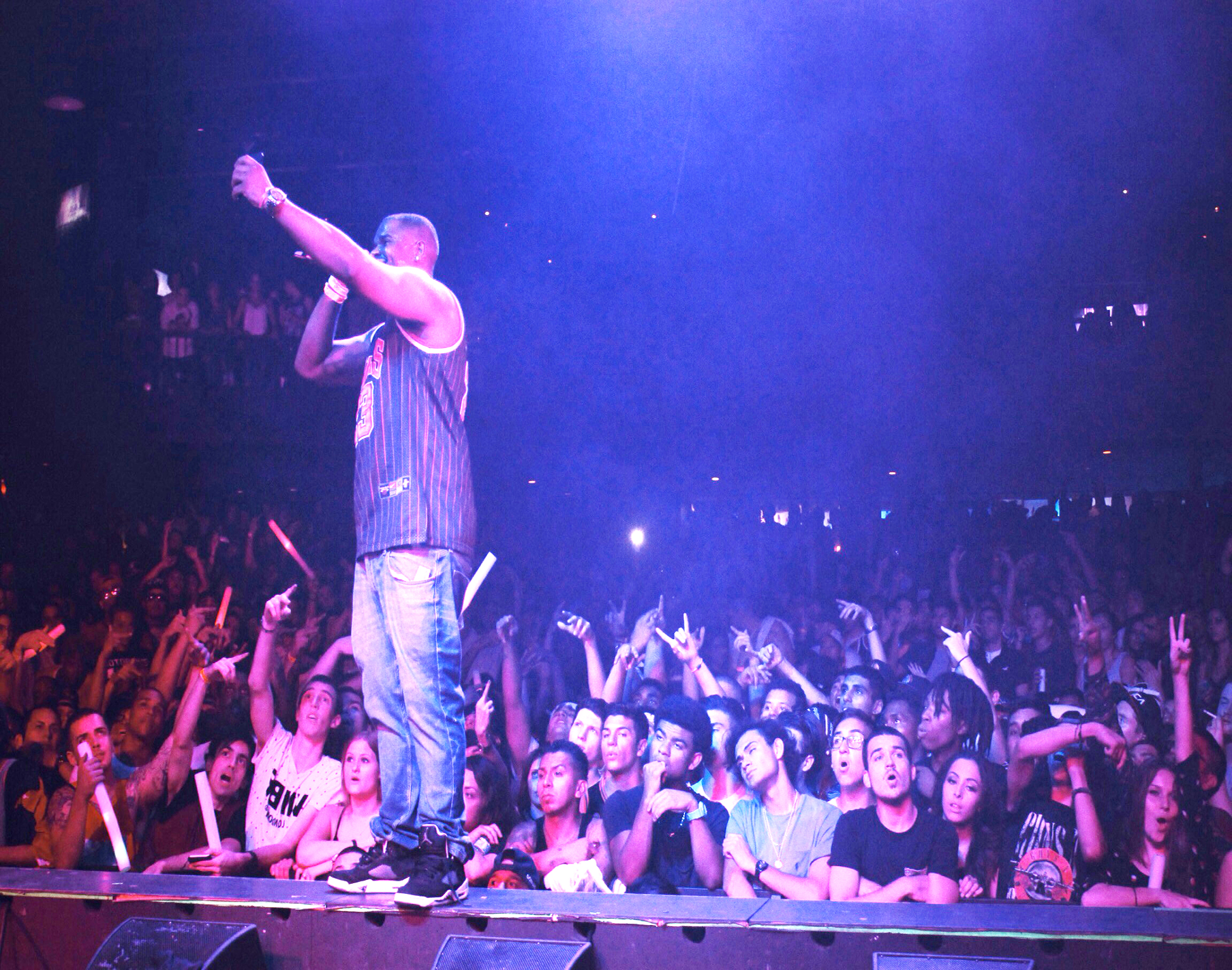
Trav Walls captures his fans reaction while performing on the HYTUNES Tour

In the summer of 2015 after gaining a lot of popularity from touring, performing with major artist and his previously released works, Walls decided to publish a promotional video that would go viral and would eventually land on internet powerhouse worldstarhiphop and other notable online sites. Directly after he would release his singled titled "Not Me." The single ended up catching the attention of recording industry powerhouse's The Source (magazine), worldstarhiphop, & AllHipHop. Other publications that supported the single were Funkmaster Flex's publication inflexwetrust.com, 50 Cent's thisis50.com, and Grammy Award winning & OVO Sound producer Boi-1da's boi-1da.net.

== Notable tours Trav Walls guest appeared on ==
- Young Thug's HyTunes Tour at The Observatory, Santa Ana, California, October 11th 2015
- Iamsu!'s Only The Real Tour at the Glass House, Pomona, California March 6, 2014
- Meek Mill's Dreams And Nightmares Tour at The Observatory, Santa Ana California, April 27th 2013
- Power 106's KPWR House Party Concert Series Tour, (3 month concert series) June 28, 2014 - August 23, 2014. with Sean Kingston, Wale (rapper), Chief Keef & ASAP Ferg
- Power 106's KPWR Christmas Mega Concert series with ASAP Ferg at the Yost Theater, Santa Ana California December 2014

=== Studio albums ===
List of albums, with selected information
Title	Album details
Title TBA	Release Date: TBA, 2017; Label: BMGI,The Orchard (company); Formats: CD, digital download, LP record

=== Singles ===
List of singles
Title	Single Details
Not Me	Released: June, 27th 2015; Label: BMGI; Format: Promo Single
5 Ring Kobe	Released: August, 19th 2016; Label: BMGI; Format: Promo Single
Power	Released: January, 6th 2017; Label: BMGI; Format: digital download

=== Mixtapes ===
List of mixtapes
Title	Mixtape Details
Dreams The 1st Hour	Released: April 18, 2012; Label: BMGI/Mixtapetorrent.com Distribution/DatPiff Distribution; Format: digital download
Title TBA	Release date: October 31, 2017; Label: BMGI/DatPiff Distribution; Format: digital download
