= Platinum Pyramids =

Studio album by Egyptian Lover
- Released: December 27, 2005
- Recorded: 2005
- Genre: Electronic rap Old school hip hop West Coast hip hop
- Label: Egyptian Empire Records
- Producer: Egyptian Lover

Egyptian Lover chronology
| Get Into It (1998) | Platinum Pyramids (2005) | 1984 (2015) |

Professional ratings
Review scores
| Source | Rating |
|---|---|
| Allmusic | Not rated link |

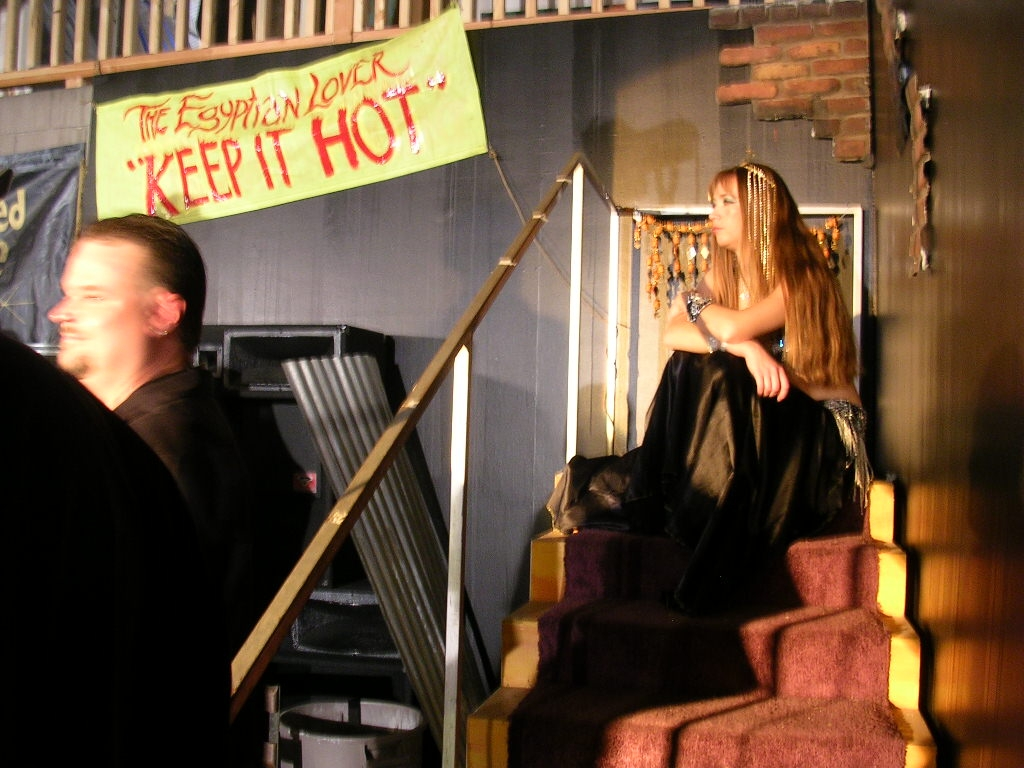
A dancer on the set of the "Keep It Hot" video, waiting during a break in filming.

Platinum Pyramids is the eighth album by rapper/DJ, Egyptian Lover. The album was released on December 27, 2005 for Egyptian Empire Records and was produced by Egyptian Lover. The album was his first since 1998's Get Into It; however, it was a commercial failure and did not make it on any album charts. Platinum Pyramids was mixed by John C. Adams.

== Track listing ==
1. "Party" – 6:09
2. "Dance Floor" – 5:47
3. "Keep It Hot" – 5:34
4. "Soiree at the Shindig" – 4:48
5. "Sintropolis Egyptian Lover 5:48
6. "Dance Erotic" – 4:52
7. "Throw It Back" – 4:53
8. "Picturesque" – 4:04
9. "Move Your Body" – 5:45
10. "The 808" – 3:09
11. "Do Your Thang" – 5:08
12. "Ooo Baby Dance" – 3:56
