= J-vibe =

American rapper

- Born: Jose Jimenez Jr; East Los Angeles, California
- Origin: Mexican American
- Genres: Hip hop, electro-funk, electronica
- Occupation: Record producer
- Instruments: synthesizers, drum machines
- Years active: 1987-present
- Labels: Dragon Mob; Musart; London; Universal; Soundshaft Music; JCD/Dunk Yer Funk
- Website: dragonmob.com

J-vibe (born Jose Jimenez Jr in East Los Angeles, California) is a composer and record producer who is known for his prolific original compositions. He is an important part of the underground West Coast rap and dance scene. He has also been a computer software programmer since he was 13 years old.

J-vibe's ability to compose music in a large range of styles is one of his best-known traits. Considering his many hip-hop and electronica productions, he credits his major musical influences to Tangerine Dream, Jean Michel Jarre, Vangelis, John Carpenter, Ultravox and the ethnic music of Los Angeles. He lives in Los Angeles with his girlfriend Hsky, who is an abstract painter.

== History ==
=== The 1980s ===
J-vibe's productions started as early as 1982, when he designed and built his first synthesizer. Professionally, his career started in 1987 when he collaborated with Sammy Hernandez from JDC Records in San Pedro, California. His first rap production was Jonny Chinga's "Mini Truck Lover" in 1987 on Billionaire Records. In 1988, he produced the classic Electrofunk record titled "Velocity, Speed and Force" under the group name VSF on Dunk Yer Funk Records. That same year, he was given a cassette tape of a track titled "RoboCop" by the Sleeze Boys. J-vibe wanted to release it on his own label, but Sam Hernandez passed it on to Sheik Records. The year 1989 brought a release with Mexican-Ecuadorian-Samoan rapper Renegade MC (Chris Dominguez). The rap titled "Wabbit" (The Roger Dance) was released on Dunk Yer Funk. It was a tribute to the film Who Framed Roger Rabbit. During 1989, he was mainly a studio session musician and also touched on Freestyle music, but didn't release any in this genre until 1991.

=== The 1990s ===
In 1990, he started Base 12 Records, which was distributed through JDC Records in San Pedro, California. In 1991, he recorded with Chicano rapper MC No Shame. The track "We Got Latino Power" and "Shake Your Hips" were local party favorites. J-vibe contributed to the Freestyle music movement this same year with a singer named Marisol. In 1992, he released a white label vinyl record titled "Norman Bass", on which he rapped. It was a play on Alfred Hitchcock's Psycho character Norman Bates. During these years, he also developed several software programs between and sold them on Compuserve.

The year 1993 brought a change when J-vibe started recording and releasing house music, techno, early trance music and dance mixes. His releases such as "DJ Stoned" (filtered house), "Celestial Teahouse" (nrg) and "Toi Noi Tieng Viet" (trance) with Vietnamese were quite new for their time. Electronica in a new wave form was in production for 1994. He recorded and produced tracks for Microcosm, which was a cross between Depeche Mode and Fad Gadget. In 1995, J-vibe teamed up with Big Ron (related to Warren G.) whom he met in Long Beach, California. Together, they attempted to release several hip-hop tracks, but were unable to come to an agreement.

In the late 90s, he had a track called "Funk Me Out" on Richard "Humpty" Vission's 1997 "Drop That Beat" mix. Many positive reviews of the track were made including the then famous DJ Rhythms website. That same year, Anonthy Larme who ran a tribute site to the Sierra video game Phantasmagoria requested community support to obtain MIDI files from the game. J-vibe, successfully extracted the MIDI music by using an ingenious method that did not violate the software. According to the documentation in the tribute site, he used two computers and a Roland MC-303. In 1998, he placed his house music production "Freak Funk Mofo Mama Pie" to be included in Carl Cox's "Non Stop 98/01" CD on London Records. During 1997 - 1999, J-vibe teamed with Frankie Fusion Medina and released over a dozen other house music singles on Soundshaft Music, Moody Records, V-Wax and Antler Subway in Benelux. In 1998, he was venturing in the Vietnamese music market. He had contacted Vietnamese singer Ly Ly after hearing her singing on Henry Chuc's "TechnoRap" album. In 1999, after the passing of his father, J-vibe went into a darker side of music. He developed a group called Vampirus Sceleratum which included his brother Santiago. They created dark ambient music. The music involved a lot of aspects of evil, the Catholic Church and darkness. One track that many referred to was titled "The Exorcism" which included the "Prayer to St. Michael."

=== The 2000s ===
In 2000, J-vibe composed and produced for the Spanish Rock group "La Razon." His compositions were inspired and made to the style of Ultravox, Classix Nouveaux and Depeche Mode. Between 2000 and 2002, J-vibe worked with R&B singer Val C (Valerie Ceballos). Together with his brother Santiago Jimenez (Smax), they composed tracks for her including "Solamente Tu", "El Ritmo", "Crazy Boy" and "I Got My Own Way." It was in 2002 that Hsky joined the label. Her abstract artwork started appearing in all of their releases. In 2003, J-vibe started working with La Movida Records, which was part owned by rappers Crooked Stilo.

While there, he composed and produced an entire album for Brown Town Looters which were recording under the name Pueblo Cafe. The album was a production of Hurban hip-hop that utilized a live Banda. Music was composed by J-vibe in his home studio and then recreated by the live band at the larger studio. It was released on Musart Records and a release exists. In 2003, Hsky suggested they start an Asian hip-hop label called Dragon Mob Records. Several rappers auditioned but none followed up. J-vibe then started working with South Central Los Angeles rappers Loyalty and Honor. Their first release was an album titled "World Coast" released in 2004. It was a plethora of music styles and even included guests musicians such as Cheryl Cooley from the 80s group Klymaxx and Citric from Pubelo Cafe.

In 2005, a track from the "World Coast" album titled "Como Las Noticias" was included in the movie "Dirty", starring Cuba Gooding Jr. For the year 2007, J-vibe created a hip-hop track for Loyalty and Honor that includes special guest rapper Don Dinero from Block Royal. J-vibe and Frankie Medina return to working on house music after a seven-year absence.

== Discography ==
=== Singles ===
- 1987: Jonny Chingas - "Mini Truck Lover"(Spanglish rap-credited as computer wizard, but he created the track)
- 1988: VSF - "Velocity, Speed and Force" (composer/producer)
- 1989: Renegade MC - "Wabbit" (The Roger Dance) includes House music version (composer/producer)
- 1991: Marisol - "High Strung" (composer/producer)
- 1991: Marisol - "The Wind" (composer/producer)
- 1991: MC No Shame - "We Got Latino Power" (composer/producer)
- 1991: MC No Shame - "Shake Your Hips" (composer/producer)
- 1991: Los Iram - "Got Got Money" (producer)
- 1992: Norman Bass - "Norman Bass" (composer/producer/rapper)
- 1992: Jonny Chingas - "L.A.P.D." (composer/producer)
- 1993: DJ Stoned - "Manzuri" (producer)
- 1993: J-vibe - "Celestial Teahouse" (composer/producer)
- 1993: J-vibe featuring Nga Tran- "Toi Noi Tieng Viet (Trance Nam Mix)" (composer/producer)
- 1993: Jonny Chingas - "Too Much Work, Too Little Sex" (producer)
- 1994: Microcosm - "It Doesn't Matter" (composer/producer)
- 1994: Microcosm - "Worship His Shrine" (composer/producer)
- 1994: Microcosm - "I Drive My Cha-dong-cha" (composer/producer)
- 1994: Microcosm - "Lost and Disappeared" (composer/producer)
- 1995: Frankie Medina & Jose "Jr" Jimenez - "Whipcreme (Uganda Mix)" (composer/co-producer)
- 1995: Frankie Medina & Jose "Jr" Jimenez - "Theme From Soundshaft" (composer/co-producer)
- 1996: Frankie Medina & Jose "Jr" Jimenez - "Desert Aura" (composer/co-producer)
- 1996: Frankie Medina & Jose "Jr" Jimenez featuring Gabby - "Take Me Now" (composer/co-producer)
- 1996: Frankie Medina & Jose "Jr" Jimenez - "Aquasol" (composer/co-producer)
- 1997: Stereo Pimps - "Funk Me Out" (composer/producer)
- 1997: Stereo Pimps - "Funkastyislic" (composer/producer)
- 1997: Frankie Medina & Jose "Jr" Jimenez - "I'm Hot For You" (composer/co-producer)
- 1998: Frankie Medina & Jose "Jr" Jimenez feat, Donna Cristy - "Hold Me Close" (composer/co-producer)
- 1998: Frankie Medina & Jose "Jr" Jimenez - "Gotta Get High" (composer/co-producer)
- 1998: Frankie Medina & Jose "Jr" Jimenez - "Freak Funk Mofo Mama Pie" (composer/co-producer)
- 1998: Frankie Medina & Jose "Jr" Jimenez - "Latinique" (composer/co-producer)
- 1998: Frankie Medina & Jose "Jr" Jimenez featuring Ron Perkov - "Funky" (composer/co-producer)
- 1998: Frankie Medina & Jose "Jr" Jimenez featuring Donna Wilson - "Never Ending" (co-composer/co-producer)
- 1999: Vampirus Sceleratum - "The Horse Carriage" (composer/producer)
- 1999: Vampirus Sceleratum - "The Excorcism" (composer/producer)
- 1999: Vampirus Sceleratum - "Pony Express" (composer/producer)
- 1999: Vampirus Sceleratum - "Alone, Without Love" (composer/producer)
- 1999: Vampirus Sceleratum - "I Am A DJ" (composer/producer)
- 1999: Vampirus Sceleratum - "The Basement" (composer/producer)
- 1999: Vampirus Sceleratum - "Ouija" (composer/producer)
- 1999: Vampirus Sceleratum - "Air Waves" (composer/producer)
- 1999: Vampirus Sceleratum - "Alone in Madagascar" (composer/producer)
- 1999: Vampirus Sceleratum - "The Fall of Kalid" (composer/producer)
- 2000: 128 bit Bboy - "Everybody, Everyone" (composer/producer)
- 2000: 128 bit Bboy - "On The Stereo" (composer/producer)
- 2000: 128 bit Bboy - "In Da Mix" (composer/producer)
- 2000: 128 bit Bboy - "B-Girl (Asia One Mix)" (composer/producer)
- 2000: 128 bit Bboy - "I Want To Be The Same" (composer/producer)
- 2000: 128 bit Bboy - "Shaolin 1015 A.D." (composer/producer)
- 2000: 128 bit Bboy - "Skylab Toddlers" (composer/producer)
- 2001: Val-C - "El Ritmo" (composer/producer)
- 2001: Val-C - "Solamente Tu" (composer/producer)
- 2001: Val-C - "Crazy Boy" (composer/producer)
- 2001: Val-C - "I Got My Own Way" (co-composer/co-producer)
- 2001: Yasmin Davidds feat. Val-C - "Latina Queen" (composer/producer)
- 2001: La Razon - "Un Planeta" (composer/producer)
- 2001: La Razon - "No Hables Mas" (composer/producer)
- 2001: La Razon - "Polve En El Viento" (composer/producer)
- 2001: La Razon - "Abuso De Mi Fe" (composer/producer)
- 2001: La Razon - "No Tengo Por Que" (composer/producer)
- 2001: La Razon - "Falsas Lagrimas" (composer/producer)
- 2001: La Razon - "No Hay Amor" (composer/producer)
- 2001: La Razon - "Tu Eres Mia" (composer/producer)

=== EPs ===
- 2001: La Razon - "Un Planeta" (composer/producer)
- 2007: Loyalty and Honor - "On The Rise" (composer/producer)

=== Albums ===
- 2003: Pueblo Cafe - "Busca Oro" (composer/producer)
- 2004: Loyalty and Honor - "World Coast" (composer/producer)
