= Pyramix (album) =

Remix album by Egyptian Lover
- Released: 1993
- Recorded: 1992–1993
- Genre: Old school hip hop West Coast hip hop
- Label: Egyptian Empire Records
- Producer: Egyptian Lover

Egyptian Lover chronology
Back from the Tomb (1994)	Pyramix (1993)	Get Into It (1990)

Pyramix is the first remix album and sixth album by rapper/DJ, Egyptian Lover. The album was released in 1993 for Egyptian Empire Records and was produced by The Egyptian Lover himself. The album was both a commercial and critical failure and did not make it to any billboard charts or feature any hit singles.

== Track listing ==
1. "Pyramix" – 1:56
2. "Dance" – 1:53
3. "The Lover" – 5:26
4. "I Want Cha" – 2:19
5. "Computer Power (Version II)" – 5:25
6. "Kinky Nation (Kingdom Kum)" – 2:34
7. "Egypt, Egypt" – 6:44
8. "Planet E (Remix)" – 7:04
9. "Egypt's Revenge (Mega Mix)" – 5:27
10. "Get High, Get X'D, Get Drunk, Get Sex'd" – 5:48
