= 1983–1988 =

1983-1988

Compilation album by Egyptian Lover
- Released: April 15, 2016
- Genre: Electro
- Length: 109:07
- Label: Stones Throw
- Producer: Egyptian Lover, Mr.Prinze
- Compiler: Peanut Butter Wolf

Egyptian Lover chronology
| 1984 (2015) | 1983-1988 (2016) |

1983–1988 is a 2016 compilation album by the Egyptian Lover. The compilation was compiled by Peanut Butter Wolf and released by Stones Throw Records. The album contains unreleased tracks by the Egyptian Lover and has music recorded between 1984 and 1994. The album received positive reviews from AllMusic and Pitchfork.

== Release ==
1983-1988 was released by Stones Throw on vinyl, compact disc and as an MP3 on April 15, 2016. The record was initially supposed to be a 30th anniversary release, but was held back to figure out which songs should be on the album.

== Critical reception ==
AllMusic suggested that "a more accurate title for this anthology might be 1983–1987, as none of the selections are drawn from the 1988 album Filthy" while noting that it includes music from 1994 such as his cover of "Sexual Harassment's "I Need a Freak". The review concluded that the compilation was "fit for a pharaoh", praising it as "sharply" designed and illustrated with "amusing" commentary from Broussard. Pitchfork stated the album was "smartly sequenced" and that the music "'80s 808-driven, Parliament- and Kraftwerk-inspired, breakbeats-referencing, futuristic-yet-analog pastiche that laid the foundation for everything from g-funk to techno to Miami bass that followed."

== Track listing ==
All track written, performed, and produced by Egyptian Lover unless otherwise noted.

1. "Egyptian Lover Theme" – 4:31
2. "Spray It Super AJ" – 3:00
3. Uncle Jamm's Army – "Dial-A-Freak" (Greg Broussard, Roger Clayton) – 6:32
4. "Yes, Yes, Yes (Peanut Butter Wolf re-edit)" (G. Broussard, R. Clayton) – 8:04
5. "Egypt, Egypt" – 6:50
6. "What is a DJ If He Can't Scratch" – 1:58
7. "And My Beat Goes Boom (Peanut Butter Wolf re-edit)" – 5:45
8. "Girls" – 5:48
9. "I Cry (Night After Night)"– 5:45
10. "The Ultimate Scratch" – 2:13
11. Egyptian Lover feat. Jamie Jupiter – "My House (On the Nile)" – 5:25
12. "Electric Encounter" – 4:25
13. "Computer Love" – 3:21
14. "Voices" – 5:20
15. Jamie Jupiter – "Computer Power" – 7:00
16. "Dance (Dub mix)" – 4:58
17. "You're So Fine" – 5:30
18. "Kinky Nation (Kingdom Kum)" – 4:15
19. "Freak-A-Holic" – 4:36
20. "The Alezby Inn" – 5:53
21. "Sexy Style" – 5:00
22. "I Need a Freak" (David Payton) – 5:02

== Personnel ==
Credits adapted from the liner notes.

- Egyptian Lover – writer, performer, producer, mixing (tracks 8, 9, 11)
- Jeff Weiss – liner notes
- Jamie Jupitor – photography, background vocals (track 11)
- Mr. Prinze – producer (track 3)
- Peanut Butter Wolf – compiler, mixing (tracks 8, 9, 11)
- Morgan Whitledge – engineer (tracks 8, 9, 11)
- Dam-Funk – additional synth, (track 22)
- Kelly Hibbert – mastering
- Jeff Jank – design
