= List of West Coast hip-hop record labels =

This is a list of notable West Coast hip hop music record labels.

- Rappers Rapp Records founded by Duffy Hooks III & Jerry Hooks Sr. in 1981.
- Ruthless Records founded by Eazy-E and Jerry Heller in 1987
- Sick Wid It Records founded by E-40 in 1989
- Lench Mob Records founded by Ice Cube in 1990
- Death Row Records founded by Dr. Dre and Suge Knight in 1991
- Doggystyle Records founded by Snoop Dogg in 1995
- Open Bar Entertainment founded by Xzibit in 1995
- Aftermath Entertainment founded by Dr. Dre in 1996
- Hoo-Bangin' Records founded by Mack 10 in 1996
- Thizz Entertainment founded by Mac Dre in 1996
- Villain Entertainment founded by MC Ren in 1999
- Amaru Entertainment founded by Afeni Shakur in 1997
- The Black Wall Street Records founded by The Game and Big Fase 100 in 2002
- Top Dawg Entertainment founded by Anthony "Top Dawg" Tiffith in 2004
- Outlaw Recordz founded by Outlawz
- Odd Future founded by Tyler, The Creator, Hodgy, Casey Veggies, Left Brian, Matt Martian, and Jasper Dolphin
