= One Track Mind =

One Track Mind may refer to:

== Music ==
=== Albums ===
- One Track Mind (Egyptian Lover album), 1986
- One Track Mind (Railroad Jerk album), 1995
- One Track Mind (Psychic Ills album), 2013

=== Songs ===
- "One Track Mind", a 2024 song by Becky Hill from the album Believe Me Now?
- "One Track Mind", a 1961 song by Bobby Lewis
- "One Track Mind", a 1986 song by Cyndi Lauper from the album True Colors
- "One Track Mind", a 2014 song by Heffron Drive from the album Happy Mistakes
- "One Track Mind", a 1977 song by Johnny Thunders and the Heartbreakers from the album L.A.M.F.
- "One Track Mind", a 1966 song by The Knickerbockers
- "One Track Mind", a 1983 song by Motörhead from the album Another Perfect Day
- "One Track Mind", a 1981 song by The Swingers from the album Practical Jokers
- "One Track Mind", a 2018 song by Thirty Seconds to Mars from the album America
- "One Track Mind", a 2010 song by Papa Roach from the album Time for Annihilation: On the Record & On the Road
