= On the Nile =

Studio album by the Egyptian Lover
- Released: 1984
- Genre: Electro
- Length: 38:04
- Label: Egyptian Empire
- Producer: The Egyptian Lover

The Egyptian Lover chronology
On the Nile (1984)	One Track Mind (1986)

On the Nile is the debut studio album by American electro artist Greg Broussard under the alias of the Egyptian Lover. The album involves party-themed music involving Broussard, attractive women, and escapism. The album was released in 1984, by Egyptian Empire Records. It charted on Billboard's Pop Albums chart.

== Production ==
Prior to recording On the Nile, Broussard recorded some music for the film Breaking & Entering. Broussard found that he had so much fun in the studio recording it, he wanted to return to do a solo project. This led to the beginning of recording the song "Egypt, Egypt". The initial song was going to be called "Beast Beats". After his sister disapproved of the themes of "Beast Beats", he changed the beat and looked into his rhyme book and created the song "Egypt, Egypt".

Broussard explained that he developed the music on the album as he would do a DJ show, finding he "wasn't a good composer or producer or anything like that. I just made the record as I would DJ, "I'm going to cut this record in, now I'm going to cut this record in." So it had no arrangement on the record. Everything was cutting like a DJ and that was kind of rare back in the day because nobody did records like that. So this one had no verse-chorus breakdown, this is just all over the place, and it was a good party record because this is how DJs cut the records back then, so that's what I did."

== Music ==
"Egypt, Egypt" was written as something Broussard could play to "something I could play at dances to let people know my name". Broussard opined that the song "was actually a riff from "Planet Rock." I just played it half-speed. Instead of doing the whole "Planet Rock" thing, I played it half-speed and came up with that." When discussing his song "My House (On the Nile)", Broussard expressed that he grew up in Los Angeles "not having much of anything" and songs such as "My House (On the Nile)" "was a fantasy to escape from reality and I expressed that way of life in my songs." Broussard expanded on the themes of escape, stating that when he was "growing up in the hood, the first thing you want to do is get out the hood. So in my mind I took myself out the hood and I just took myself to any place I could find, which was probably just Egypt at the time." As part of electro hop genre, Broussard's music drew from musicians such as Parliament/Funkadelic, Prince and Afrika Bambaataa. Broussard uses electronic instruments and voice manipulators in his music, specifically noting that he often applies "that robot voice and that electronic music—using real electronic sounds from spaceships from outer space. To me, it was the best way to escape from where I grew up"

"I Cry (Night After Night)" was influenced by Dean Martin. Broussard explained that "Dean Martin has inspired me more than anyone has ever known, Dean Martin was that sexy, ‘I got women’ kind of guy. I was in love with that whole image, and that's where a lot of the Egyptian Lover's image came from. He had a song called Crying Time, and I took that and made I Cry (Night After Night)." "What is a DJ If He Can't Scratch" originated from Broussard feeling that if DJs did not mix or scratch over records and just let them play, that they were not real DJs. "And My Beat Goes Boom" originated from KROQ in Los Angeles where a song played that involving a woman that walked down the street and "went boom." Influenced by the song, Broussard began programming a song the beats from the Run-DMC songs "It's Like That" and "Hard Times".

== Release ==
On the Nile was released in 1984. The album was released on vinyl and cassette on Egyptian Empire Records, which was distributed by Macola Records. Macola pressed records for anyone willing to pay the rate of $1,000 for five hundred copies. For the album cover, which both Broussard and Record pressing plant owner Don Macmillan felt was not commercial enough, Macmillan purchased the costumes and rented Egyptian memorabilia and hired the photographer to shoot the cover.

Broussard initially did not think the record would be a big hit as he "just wanted to make a record with my name on it so the girls could hear it." Broussard opined that after the radio station KDAY began playing the record "every hour on the hour and I started getting bookings for shows. Prices started going higher and higher. I never stopped doing shows ever since then." The album charted on the Top Black Albums chart in the United States where it entered the charts at 56th place on January 26, 1985. The album spent 9 weeks on the chart peaking at 44.

A single for "Egypt, Egypt" was released which by March 1985 had sold 425,000 units in the United States."Egypt, Egypt" was originally going to have a music video which Broussard explained that it had initially involved "an escalator into hell". The video was never shot.

== Reception ==
Professional ratings
Review scores
Source	Rating
AllMusic	4/5 stars
Rap Reviews	7.5/10 stars

In a retrospective review, AllMusic noted, "The Egyptian Lover never had great rapping skills, but he was definitely an original and imaginative producer/writer—and his risk-taking spirit serves him well on definitive, high-tech tunes like "Egypt Egypt," "My House (On the Nile)," and "Girls." On the Nile isn't the only Egyptian Lover LP that is worth owning, but most fans insist that it is his most essential and consistent album—and they're absolutely right."

Reviewing the album in his book The Rough Guide to Hip-Hop, Peter Shapiro declared the album to be "one of the definitive documents of early LA electro-hop" praising tracks "Egypt, Egypt", "Girls" and "My House (On the Nile)" as electro classics.

Reviewing the album in 2009 for Rap Reviews, Patrick Taylor called On the Nile "a quintessentially eighties album, from the ticking beats to the electric guitars to the synth solos." He noted that while On the Nile may sound dated today, Broussard's work was cutting-edge at the time and was part of a movement who "were basically inventing a new musical language."

== Track listing ==
All songs written by the Egyptian Lover.

=== Side A ===
1. "My House (On the Nile)" – 4:21
2. "What Is a D.J. If He Can't Scratch" – 3:17
3. "Girls" – 7:05
4. "Computer Love (Sweet Dreams)" – 3:14

=== Side B ===
1. "Egypt, Egypt" – 5:19
2. "I Cry (Night After Night)" – 5:04
3. "Unreal" – 5:32
4. "And My Beat Goes Boom" – 4:12

== Charts ==
=== Album ===
Chart (1985)	Peak position
US Top Black Albums	44
Top Pop Albums	146

=== Singles ===
Chart (1984)	Title	Peak position
Top Black Singles	"Egypt, Egypt"	64

== Credits ==
Credits adapted from the On the Nile back cover.

- The Egyptian Lover – producer, arrangements, programming, performer, synths, voice
- Chuck Gentry – guitar (on "Unreal", and "I Cry (Night After Night)")
- "Hanky Donig Panky" – synths
- Jamie Jupiter – background vocals (on "Unreal" and "I Cry (Night After Night)")
- Unicorn – art direction
- Phil Bedel – photography
