= Back from the Tomb =

Studio album by The Egyptian Lover
- Released: 1994
- Recorded: 1993–1994
- Genre: Old-school hip hop, West Coast hip hop
- Label: Egyptian Empire Records
- Producer: Egyptian Lover

The Egyptian Lover chronology
King of Ecstasy (1989)	Back from the Tomb (1994)	Pyramix (1996)

Back From the Tomb is the fourth studio album and fifth overall by rapper/DJ, Egyptian Lover. The album was released in 1994 for Egyptian Empire Records and was produced by Egyptian Lover. The album was Egyptian Lover's first since 1988's Filthy, however due to Gangsta rap dominating the charts and air waves, the album was a critical and commercial failure and did not make it on any billboard charts or produce any singles.

== Track listing ==
1. "I'm So Freaky" – 4:19
2. "Bounce That Bootie" – 3:50
3. "I Need a Freak" – 4:51
4. "Gotta Have Ya" – 4:24
5. "My Lil Telephone Freak (Dial-A-Freak, Pt. 2)" – 4:32
6. "Make It Talk to Me Baby" – 3:35
7. "Work, Freak, Pump That Body" – 7:52
8. "Yea!" – 4:39
9. "World of Girls" – 5:18
10. "Release to the Beat" – 4:39
