= Tyrants in Therapy =

American band in Los Angeles

- Years active: 1983–present
- Label: Emotional Coathanger Records
- Members: Michael J; AbbeAbbe
- Website: tyrantsintherapy.com

The Tyrants in Therapy are an American band which was formed in Los Angeles, California, United States, in 1983. Having started as a foursome, since 1994 they have operated with only two members: songwriter, lead singer and producer Michael J; and songwriter and lead singer AbbeAbbe. From 2001 to 2008, they wrote, produced and starred in a music and comedy television program, Meet The Tyrants in Therapy, which aired on public-access television cable TV networks.

== Band history ==
The Tyrants in Therapy formed in late 1983, as a four-person band. The original members, who adopted nicknames, were: writer, songwriter, producer and former advertising copywriter Michael J (officially Michael Jaye); writer and actress AbbeAbbe (Abbe Kanter); songwriter, background vocalist, drum machine operator and art director Harol Glasscock (Carol Hannan); and songwriter, producer and keyboardist Charlie X (Charles Lamont).

For the first two years of their existence, the Tyrants in Therapy were financed by music publishers, who allowed them full rein for their creative impulses.

When the band released its first record, the 12" EP 3 People Nude Below the Waist (featuring scratching by the Knights of the Turntables), in 1984, it flopped. The Tyrants in Therapy released another 12-inch record dance single the following year, Paint it Pink (co-produced by Guy Roche), which got club play around the U.S.

The Tyrants' breakthrough occurred in 1986, with Too Tuff To Cry. The 12-inch single became a hit in Los Angeles’s Hi NRG underground, selling more than 100,000 copies in Southern California and Mexico.

For the next few years, the Tyrants in Therapy and its members continued to release a steady stream of 12-inch singles on various independent Los Angeles labels.

More success came in 1989, with the release of Big Pink House (written with Terry Shaddick), and then in 1996, with Boy, both of which received significant airplay on urban pop radio around the U.S.

After years of frustration with their labels, the Tyrants in Therapy formed their own imprint, Emotional Coathanger Records, in 2000. For a long time, they had felt that their artistic vision was being compromised, as the various labels with which they had associated had made them adopt an increasingly constrictive dance sound. Dismayed that they were being compelled to accept a format that de-emphasized lyrics and message, the Tyrants in Therapy assumed full control of the content, production, packaging and promotion of their music.

That same year, they released their first full-length album, Meet The Tyrants in Therapy, on their new label. Making use of samples and rhythms dating from the 1940s to the 1990s; blending genres such as rock, dance, punk, blues and cabaret; and addressing topics such as human rights, suicide, lesbianism, pedophilia and cake; the tracks marked a move away from disco and into a style they dubbed “Punk Cabaret”.

In 2001, the Tyrants in Therapy shot the first episode of their television series, Meet The Tyrants in Therapy. In total, 22 were aired.

In 2009, they released their second full-length album, High Class Trash.

In 2010, the Tyrants released Dance with The Tyrants: Classic Dance Hits Vol. 1, a compilation of their hard-to-find dance singles.

In 2012, they returned to the international dance scene with Perfect Love, an EP that opened new territories for the group, including Eastern Europe and Latin America, and which landed at the #1 position on Top80 Radio in Warsaw.

In 2013, the Tyrants continued their dance music renaissance with two releases. The first was Dance with The Tyrants Vol. 2: The Original 12” Extended Club Mixes. The second was Once Upon A Time, a track produced with Greek DJ/producer Thomas Bainas, and which mixed the Tyrants’ romantic side with anti-war politics.

== Personnel ==
Although the Tyrants in Therapy formed in 1983, the first association of the four founding members came in 1977, when Michael J and AbbeAbbe met during an improvisational acting class they were taking in Hollywood. They started dating, before marrying the following year. The next association occurred in 1981, when the couple began writing songs with Charlie X, who had been introduced to them by Jim Callon, the owner of JDC Records and an old college friend of Michael J’s. Glasscock then came on the scene in 1983, after she joined the Beverly Hills advertising agency where Michael J worked.

At AbbeAbbe’s suggestion, the foursome decided to name themselves the Tyrants in Therapy, and started performing in Los Angeles rock clubs.

Almost immediately, the Tyrants in Therapy were reduced to a trio, as Charlie X, a working lounge musician, balked at playing for little or no money. In 1985, Glasscock left the band as well, in order to focus on her advertising career. Glasscock was replaced by background vocalist Maureen Mahon, and for the next few years, the position would continue to change frequently. Mahon departed after six months due to artistic differences, and her replacement, Anni Celsi, lasted even less time, being fired in 1986 due to attitude problems and her inability to vocally complement AbbeAbbe. Celsi was replaced by Brenda X (Brenda Lavin), but she was deemed to be temperamentally unsuited to the rock and gay clubs in which the Tyrants in Therapy gigged, and in 1986, was asked to leave. Artistic differences led to Stina Hokenson leaving the band in 1987, while her replacement, songwriter and co-lead vocalist Stacy Dunne, left of her own accord the following year when she moved to Nashville. Keyboardist and songwriter Jeff Bennett (grandson of Boyd Bennett) came on the scene in 1991, and in 1993 was joined for a few months by another keyboardist, Marcy Szrama. However, the 2-keyboardist format proved unwieldy, and Szrama was gone by year’s end. In 1994, Bennett also left, in order to pursue his musical studies at CSUN. The last person to fill the position was songwriter, guitarist and background vocalist Andi Ostrowe; she also lasted just a handful of gigs, before personal problems compelled her to quit in 1994. At that point, Michael J and AbbeAbbe decided to keep the Tyrants in Therapy as a duo.

== Discography ==
The Tyrants in Therapy have released two studio albums, one EP and seven singles. As well, their material has appeared on various dance compilations and bootlegs over the years.

Year	Name	Type	Label
1984	3 People Nude Below the Waist	EP	JDC Records
1985	Paint It Pink	Single	JDC Records
1986	Too Tuff To Cry	Single	JDC Records
1987	Crazy Dreams	Single	JDC Records
1987	P-P-Power of Love (AbbeAbbe solo project)	Single	Sheik Records
1988	Matter of Time (AbbeAbbe solo project)	12-inch vinyl	Sheik Records
1988	Call of the Wild (Michael J solo project)	12-inch vinyl	JDC Records
1989	Sweet Magic (AbbeAbbe and Stacy Dunne collaboration)	12-inch vinyl	Sheik Records
1989	Big Pink House	Single	TSR Records
1992	Sex Bomb	Single	JDC Records
1995	Now ‘n 4 Ever (AbbeAbbe solo project)	Single	Sheik Records
1996	Boy	Single	Sheik Records
2000	Meet The Tyrants in Therapy	Album	Emotional Coathanger Records
2000	Om Shanti Om	EP	JDC Records
2009	High Class Trash	Album	Emotional Coathanger Records
2010	Dance with The Tyrants: Classic Dance Hits Vol. 1	Album	Emotional Coathanger Records
2012	Perfect Love	EP	Emotional Coathanger Records
2013	Dance with The Tyrants Vol. 2: The Original 12” Extended Club Mixes	Album	Emotional Coathanger Records
2013	Once Upon A Time	EP	Emotional Coathanger Records
2014	Om Shanti Om	Maxi digital	Emotional Coathanger Records
2015	Dance The Night Away	12-inch vinyl	Emotional Coathanger Records
2015	Don’t Be Scared	Maxi digital	Emotional Coathanger Records
2019	Sicka Bein’ Sick	Maxi digital	Emotional Coathanger Records
2019	Spoken Weird	Album	Emotional Coathanger Records
2021	Normalize (The Planet’s Going Crazy) (Tyrants in Therapy feat. James Manno)	Single (digital)	Emotional Coathanger Records
2021	Marijuana Talk	Single	Emotional Coathanger Records

== Television ==
Meet The Tyrants in Therapy was a half-hour comedy and variety show, combining comedy and political satire with original Tyrants in Therapy music. From 2001 to 2008, the Tyrants in Therapy wrote, produced, co-directed, edited and starred in 25 episodes, which aired on several Public-access television cable TV networks (including AT&T, Adelphia, Comcast, Charter and Time Warner) in the greater Los Angeles area. Meet The Tyrants in Therapy is currently being broadcast on the Manhattan Neighborhood Network's Lifestyle Channel every Sunday night at midnight (Eastern Standard Time).

The Tyrants in Therapy’s first recording experience occurred in Adelphia Cable’s Van Nuys Public-access television studio, after AbbeAbbe had suggested that shooting some lip sync footage from the Meet The Tyrants in Therapy studio album might help them secure a new booking agent. The results, although very rough, were encouraging enough to convince the Tyrants in Therapy to book more studio time. This material then became the basis for the Meet The Tyrants in Therapy television program.

At first, the Tyrants in Therapy directed themselves, but for the third episode, director/choreographer Ceil Gruessing, a friend of AbbeAbbe’s from Antioch College, was enlisted to direct. While problems were encountered with sound, lighting and framing, the Tyrants in Therapy persevered and went on to work with several other stage directors, including Debra De Liso, Steven Memel, Betsey Cassell, Tanya Kane-Parry and Tracy Winters. When none of them were available, the Tyrants in Therapy began self-directing again.

The veteran radio personality and DJ Pierre Gonneau, who had acted as a booking agent for the Tyrants in Therapy during their disco years, became the program’s first host, known as "Lucky Pierre". For health reasons, he was forced to retire from the program in 2005.

On De Liso’s recommendation, Gonneau was replaced by the actor Time Winters, who premiered in the episode Sleeping Olympics, starring as Dr Theodore von Dongle. His wife, the aforementioned Tracy Winters, is also part of the cast. She plays the role of Louise LaFaux, a real estate agent from whom the Tyrants in Therapy buy a $10 million mansion.

Two other cast members are Jennifer Taub and Jaxon Duff Gwillim, who are married in real life, and who portray the wedded Shelley and Sheldon Schlumpmeister, a couple of nouveaux riche. Gwillim also occupies the role of Timothy von Dongle, the substitute host. Czech character actor Oto Brezina has the recurring role of Dr Cabeza, the Tyrants in Therapy’s Buenos Aires-based psychiatrist. John Voldstad, an old friend of AbbeAbbe’s from high school, has filled a variety of roles in Meet The Tyrants in Therapy.

Since 2006, the Tyrants in Therapy have been posting excerpts from the program (as well as songs and short films) on the video sites YouTube, Veoh, Metacafe, Dailymotion and Funny or Die.

In 2007, Meet The Tyrants in Therapy won the West Hollywood Public-access television “Best Outside Program” award.

Episode	Name	Directors	Stars
1	30 vicarious minutes with the Tyrants in Therapy	Tyrants in Therapy	Tyrants in Therapy, Pierre Gonneau
2	Meet the Tyrants in Therapy	Tyrants in Therapy	Tyrants in Therapy, Pierre Gonneau
3	Kind of a Drag	Ceil Gruessing	Tyrants in Therapy, Pierre Gonneau, Richard Dunne
4	Lipshtick	Tyrants in Therapy	Tyrants in Therapy, Pierre Gonneau
5	Gimme Some Lip	Tyrants in Therapy	Tyrants in Therapy, Pierre Gonneau
6	Lip Bomb	Tyrants in Therapy	Tyrants in Therapy, Pierre Gonneau
7	Phat Lip	Tyrants in Therapy	Tyrants in Therapy, Pierre Gonneau, Richard Dunne
8	Read My Lips	Tyrants in Therapy	Tyrants in Therapy, Pierre Gonneau
9	Lip Gloss	Tyrants in Therapy	Tyrants in Therapy, Pierre Gonneau
10	Liposuction	Steven Memel, Tyrants in Therapy	Tyrants in Therapy, Pierre Gonneau Gonneau, Debra De Liso, John Voldstad
11	Airheads	Betsey Cassell, Debra De Liso, Tyrants in Therapy	Tyrants in Therapy, Pierre Gonneau, John Voldstad, Stig Eldred, Andrea Herz, Zee Lo, Craig Henry
12	Lip Clips	Tyrants in Therapy	Tyrants in Therapy, Pierre Gonneau
13	Mobile Sex Therapy	Tyrants in Therapy, Debra De Liso	Tyrants in Therapy, Debra De Liso, Pierre Gonneau
14	Buffoon Therapy	Tyrants in Therapy	Tyrants in Therapy, Pierre Gonneau, John Voldstad
15	Sleeping Olympics	Tyrants in Therapy	Tyrants in Therapy, Time Winters, Oto Brezina
16	The Tyrants of Mona Lisa Hill	Tyrants in Therapy, Tracy Winters	Tyrants in Therapy, Time Winters, Tracy Winters, Jennifer Taub, Jaxon Duff Gwillim
17	No One Dancin	Tyrants in Therapy, Tracy Winters	Tyrants in Therapy, Time Winters, Tracy Winters, Jennifer Taub, Jaxon Duff Gwillim
18	Clip Trip	Tyrants in Therapy	Tyrants in Therapy, Time Winters
19	Shrink Rap	Tyrants in Therapy, Tanya Kane-Parry, Tracy Winters	Tyrants in Therapy, Time Winters, Oto Brezina, Jennifer Taub, Jaxon Duff Gwillim
20	The Day Room Sun	Tyrants in Therapy, Tracy Winters	Tyrants in Therapy, Time Winters, Oto Brezina, Jennifer Taub, Jaxon Duff Gwillim
21	Fashion Sense	Debra De Liso, Tyrants in Therapy	Brian Dyer, Tyrants in Therapy, Time Winters, Debra De Liso
22	The Patriot Show	Debra De Liso, Tyrants in Therapy	Jaxon Duff Gwillim, Max Thayer, Peter Altschuler, Debra De Liso
23	Don’t Forget to Duck	Michael J, Abbe Kanter	Tyrants in Therapy, Oto Brezina, Time Winters, Jaxon Gwillim, Jennifer Taub
24	Diva Therapy	Debra De Liso	Tyrants in Therapy, Alexandra De Liso Smith, Wynton McCurdy, Danny Smith, Time Winters
25	Live at Swinghouse: An Evening with the Tyrants in Therapy	Art Simon, Tyrants in Therapy	Tyrants in Therapy
26	A Perfectly Lovely Recording Session	Michael J	Tyrants in Therapy, Miguel Plasencia, Daniel Walker, Marc Mann
27	Shaman Therapy	Debra De Liso, Tyrants in Therapy	Tyrants in Therapy, Jaxon Gwillim, Jennifer Taub
