= Get Into It (Egyptian Lover album) =

Studio album by Egyptian Lover
- Released: 1990
- Recorded: 1989–1990
- Genre: Electro; Old school hip hop West Coast hip hop
- Label: Egyptian Empire Records
- Producer: Egyptian Lover

Egyptian Lover chronology
King of Ecstasy: His Greatest Hits Album (1989)	Get Into It (1990)	Pyramix (1993)

Get Into It is the seventh studio album by American rapper and DJ Egyptian Lover. It was released in 1990 on Egyptian Empire Records, the artist's own label, with catalog numbers DMSR-00993 and DMSR-CD993. The album was produced by Egyptian Lover and issued on LP, cassette, and CD. Physical pressings credit Egyptian Empire Records and carry 1990 date codes.

== Background ==
Egyptian Lover was a leading figure in West Coast electro and club-oriented hip hop during the 1980s, releasing music through Egyptian Empire Records and related Los Angeles scenes. Albums preceding Get Into It include On the Nile (1984), One Track Mind (1986), Filthy (1988), and King of Ecstasy: His Greatest Hits Album (1989).

== Track listing ==
All tracks are written and produced by Egyptian Lover.

1. "Love Theme" – 4:16
2. "Got Me Goin' (Crazy)" – 6:49
3. "'Me'" – 3:32
4. "90's Ladies" – 3:26
5. "Let's Get It On" – 3:47
6. "Get Into It" – 2:42
7. "$" – 5:09
8. "Tear the Roof Off" – 4:36
9. "Dance Music" – 5:13
10. "Jam" – 4:09

== Release ==
Original U.S. release: Egyptian Empire Records, 1990 (LP / cassette / CD, catalog numbers DMSR-00993 and DMSR-CD993).

== Personnel ==
Adapted from the Egyptian Empire Records CD release.

- Egyptian Lover – vocals, production, drum programming, arrangement
