= King of Ecstasy =

Compilation album by Egyptian Lover
- Released: June 1, 1989
- Recorded: 1984–1988
- Genre: Electro
- Length: 66:16
- Label: Egyptian Empire Records
- Producer: Egyptian Lover

Egyptian Lover chronology
Filthy (1988)	King of Ecstasy (1989)	Back from the Tomb (1994)

Professional ratings
Review scores
Source	Rating
Allmusic	4/5 stars

King of Ecstasy is the first compilation album and fourth album overall by rapper/DJ, Egyptian Lover. The album was released in 1989 for Egyptian Empire Records and featured his greatest hits from his previous three albums.

== Track listing ==
1. "Sexy Style" (Greatest Hits Dub Mix) 7:22
2. "My House (On the Nile)" (Greatest Hits Mix) 9:04
3. "Freak-A-Holic" (12" Dub Mix) 7:15
4. "You're So Fine" (Greatest Hits Edit) 6:48
5. "Egypt, Egypt" (12" Original Mix) 6:49
6. "The Alezby Inn" (Remodeled Vocal Version) 9:31
7. "The Lover" (12" Long Mix) 9:56
8. "Girls" (Dub Mix) 9:31
