= Rucci =

Rucci is an Italian surname. Notable people with the surname include:

- Celina Rucci, Argentine vedette, actress and model
- Claudia Rucci, Argentine politician
- Hayden Rucci (born 2001), American football player
- José Ignacio Rucci, Argentine union leader
- Michelangelo Rucci, Australian sports journalist, and writer
- Michele Rucci, Italian biomedical engineer and neuroscientist
- Nolan Rucci (born 2002), American football player
- Ralph Rucci, American fashion designer and artist
- Renni Rucci, American rapper
- Todd Rucci (born 1970), former professional American football player
