= Dunk Yer Funk Records =

- Founded: 1985
- Founder: Jim Callon
- Distributor(s): JDC Records
- Genre: Electro
- Country of origin: United States
- Official website: www.jdcrecords.com

Dunk Yer Funk Records was a sub-label of record distributor JDC Records, active in San Pedro, California from 1985 to 1988. With the growing popularity of rap music and electrofunk, Jim Callon decided to form a sub-label. This would keep his JDC Records music catalog focused on dance music and Dunk Yer Funk on rap. The logo of the music label was a 12-inch vinyl record being dipped into a cup of coffee.

Dunk Yer Funk featured important artists such as Uncle Jamms Army, The Unknown DJ and Doug Wimbish. Other less known artists were released on the label, but one in specific would become a classic; "Velocity, Speed and Force" by VSF (which was produced by J-vibe). It sold less than 3000 copies when it was originally released and the remaining stock was recycled. More than a decade later, its classic status and rarity drove the value around $100–$200 per copy and vinyl record collectors continue to search for it.

== Releases ==
- DYF-002 Various L.A. Beats (12")
- DYF-003 Doug Wimbish & Fats Comet - Don't Forget That Beat (12")
- DYF-004 Orbit (Re-oRbiT)* (featuring Carol Hall) - The Beat Goes On (12")
- DYF-005 Toddy Tee - Just Say No (12")
- DYF-007 Uncle Jam's Army - Dial-a-Freak (10 Minute Remix) (12")
- DYF-008 Toddy Tee - Gangster Boogie (12")
- DYF-009 DJ Slice & Kool Rock Jay - Slice It Up (12")
- DYF-010 The Boo-Yow Boyz - We Came to Rock (12")
- DYF-011 DJ Matrix - Feel My Bass (12")
- DYF-012 VSF - Velocity, Speed And Force (12")
- DYF-013 Late Night Magic - Scream Baybee / Lost in Bass (12")
- DYF-014 Renegade MC - Wabbit (The Roger Dance) (12")
- DYF-015 Impakt - Defcon (12"). Defcon was a song written, arranged, produced, mixed, and performed by Impakt for Big City Records and released in 1986. The early Hip Hop track is now considered part of the Electro lexicon. Defcon was recorded at Son. Song Studios and published by Magic Mix Music Publ. (BMI). The track was engineered by T-Bone and performed by Impakt: Dino Esposito, Frankie Anobile, and Rob Hatchcock.
- DYF-016 Unknown D.J. - The Basstronic (12")
