= Egyptian Empire Records =

- Founded: 1983 (as Freak Beat Records); 1985 (as Egyptian Empire Records)
- Founder: Greg Broussard
- Distributor(s): Self-distributed
- Genre: Electro, Hi-NRG, Hip hop
- Country of origin: USA
- Location: Los Angeles, California

Egyptian Empire Records is the oldest electro record label owned by Egyptian Lover. Known for its unique style of electro music, it also has a political background because Egyptian Lover was the first Afroamerican Label Owner.

== Background ==
It was founded in 1983 by Egyptian Lover as Freak Beat Records. Since then, it has served us with uptempo Electro Beats pressed on Wax. During its first few years, it was the home of Uncle Jamm's Army. In 1985, it changed its name to Egyptian Empire Records. Several releases made it to the Billboard Charts and it was the Home of Rodney O and Joe Cooley.

== Notable Artists ==
- Egyptian Lover
- Rodney O and Joe Cooley
- Uncle Jamm's Army
- The Lover II
- 2 O'Clock
- His Majesti
