= JDC Records =

- Founded: 1976
- Founder: Jim Callon
- Genre: Disco, Hi-NRG
- Country of origin: United States
- Official website: http://www.jdcrecords.com/

JDC Records was an important record distributor during the golden years of dance music (1976–1990). It was originally located in San Pedro, California and owned by Jim and Dale Callon. The company name came from their initials, JDC. They distributed world-wide and carried many independent labels. In the 80s, JDC was known for their "JDC Mixers", a collection of 10 12" mixes spanning the hottest 80s Hi-NRG, dance/club, and more. Popular SoCal DJs such as DJ Pebo made this project work from 1983-1988. JDC also had a retail record store in San Pedro. It was managed by Rudy Benavides.

Jim Callon worked closely on production with his UCLA classmate, Charles Lamont of Barking Dog Studios.

JDC was also a record label which included a sub-label of hip-hop called Dunk Yer Funk Records which released the electrofunk classic "Velocity, Speed and Force" by VSF (which was produced by J-vibe).

Today, JDC operates out of San Pedro, California, as a one-stop distribution company for all genres of music, specializing in vinyl records, but also offering CDs and cassette tapes. A new retail shop also opened in San Pedro in 2016, in front of the distribution warehouse.

== Releases ==
- JDC 0027 Unknown Artist L.A. Party Mix (12")
- JDC 0028 Bobby Davenport - Time (Has Come Today) (12")
- JDC 0029 Rofo - Flashlight On A Disconight (12")
- JDC 0030 Precious - Taboo (12")
- JDC 0031 Michael Baker – Don't You Want My Lovin' (12")
- JDC 0032 Various The JDC Mixer - 7 Years Of Disco / Dance Music (12")
- JDC 0033 Victor & The Glove - Breakmixer (Part 1) (12", S/Sided)
- JDC 0033 Victor & The Glove - Breakmixer (Part 2) (12", S/Sided)
- JDC 0034 Knights Of The Turntables - Techno Scratch (12")
- JDC 0035 Rofo - You've Got To Move It On (12")
- JDC 0036 Tapps - My Forbidden Lover (12")
- JDC 0037 Psychic Interface - Tribal Stomp (Cherokee Nation) (12")
- JDC 0038 Tyrants in Therapy - Three People (Nude Below The Waist) (12")
- JDC 0039 The Glass Family – Smoke Your Troubles Away / Mr. DJ You Know How To Make Me Dance (12")
- JDC 0041 Knights Of The Turntables - Fresh Mess (12")
- JDC 0042 Purple Flash - We Can Make It (12")
- JDC 0043 Samantha Gilles - Feel It (12")
- JDC 0044 The Glass Family featuring Taka Boom - The Stars Are Out (12")
- JDC 0045 Various - The JDC Mixer Volume 2 (12")
- JDC 0046 Jessica Williams - They Call Me Queen Of Fools (12")
- JDC 0047 Arpeggio / French Kiss - Love & Desire / Panic (12")
- JDC 0048 Rofo - I Want You (12")
- JDC 0049 Venus - One Shot Lover (12")
- JDC 0050 Soif De La Vie - Goddess Of Love (12")
- JDC 0051 Charity / Carlos Perez - Sweet Conversation / Las Manos Quietas (12")
- JDC 0052 Igor RX-15 - Nuthin' But Beats (12")
- JDC 0053 Sunbelt – Spin It (12")
- JDC 0054 Tyrants In Therapy - Paint It Pink (12")
- JDC 0055 Various - The JDC Mixer Volume 3 (12")
- JDC 0056 J.D. Hall - #1 Lover (12")
- JDC 0057 People Like Us – Reincarnation (12")
- JDC 0058 Cerrone - Trippin On The Moon (12")
- JDC 0059 Ferrara - Love Attack (12")
- JDC 0060 Rosebud - Have A Cigar (12")
- JDC 0061 People Like Us - Midnight Lover (12")
- JDC 0062 Finzy Kontini - Cha Cha Cha (12")
- JDC 0063 Latin Lover - Cassanova Action (12")
- JDC 0064 Antonio Rodriguez / Dee D. Jackson - La Bamba / S.O.S. (Love To The Rescue) (12")
- JDC 0065 Angie Gold - Eat You Up (12")
- JDC 0066 Patrick Cowley - Right On Target (12")
- JDC 0067 Various - The JDC Mixer Volume 4 (12")
- JDC 0068 Phaeax - Talk About (12")
- JDC 0069 Santa Esmeralda - Another Cha Cha/Cha Cha Suite (12")
- JDC 0070 Michael Prince – Dance Your Love Away (12")
- JDC 0071 Telex - Moskow Diskow (12")
- JDC 0072 Miriam Lee – The Men In My Life (12")
- JDC 0073 Astaire - Fire Me Up (12")
- JDC 0074 Colleen - Soft Cafe (12")
- JDC 0075 J.D. Hall – Call Me Up (12")
- JDC 0076 Venus - Hot Sun On Video (12")
- JDC 0077 Mo' Boss – Tequila (12")
- JDC 0078 The Frank Barber Orchestra – Hooked On Big Bands The Glen Miller Medley (12")
- JDC 0079 Tyrants In Therapy - Too Tuff To Cry (12")
- JDC 0080 Venus – Twilight Zone (12")
- JDC 0081 Q-Boys – Beyond The Clouds (12")
- JDC 0082 Sabby - Friday Night (12")
- JDC 0083 Various - The JDC Mixer Volume 5 The Classic Mixer! (12")
- JDC 0084 Tapps – Hurricane (12")
- JDC 0085 Tapps - Don't Pretend To Know (12")
- JDC 0086 People Like Us feat. Cindy Dickinson – Deliverance (12")
- JDC 0087 Various - The JDC Mixer Vol. 6 (12")
- JDC 0088 Persuasion - Take Me Now (12")
- JDC 0089 Dharma - Plastic Doll (12")
- JDC 0090 Psychic Interface - Body To Body (12")
- JDC 0091 Bianca - One More Time (12")
- JDC 0092 Trilogy - Not Love (12")
- JDC 0093 Boytronic - You / Bryllyant (12", Single)
- JDC 0094 Shy Rose - I Cry For You (12")
- JDC 0096 Scotch - Money Runner (Remix) (12")
- JDC 0097 MC Miker G. & DJ Sven - Holiday Rap (12")
- JDC 0099 Tyrants In Therapy - Crazy Dreams (12")
- JDC 0100 Tantra - The Hills Of Katmandu (The Patrick Cowley Megamix) (12")
- JDC 0101 Man 2 Man Meets Jessica Williams - These Boots Are Made For Walking (12")
- JDC 0102 Michael Bow - One Shot So Hot (12")
- JDC 0103 Various - The JDC Mixer Volume 7 (12", Mix)
- JDC 0105 Jonny Chingas – Samba (12)
- JDC 0106 The Tyrant Michael - Call Of The Wild (12")
- JDC 0107 Digital Emotion - Get Up "Action!" (12")
- JDC 0108 Bianca - Midnight Lover (12")
- JDC 0109 Various - The JDC Mixer Volume VIII (12")
- JDC 0110 Rofo - Rofo's Theme (12")
- JDC 0111 Scotch – Man To Man (I Want To Dance Without My Shoes) (12")
- JDC 0112 David Storrs - Dancing On The Planet (12")
- JDC 0113 Jonny Chingas - Automatic Lover (12")
- JDC 0114 Bollock Brothers - The Harley David / Son Of A Bitch (12")
- JDC 0115 Divine Sounds - What People Do For Money (12")
- JDC 0116 Sexual Harassment - I Need a Freak (12")
- JDC 0117 Various - The JDC Mixer No. 9 (12")
- JDC 0118 Unknown Artist – Sea Cruise Medley/The Soul Surfers (12")
- JDC 0119 Lisa – Love Is Like An Itching In My Heart (Aerobics Mix) (12")
- JDC 0120 Lisa – Sex Dance (12")
- JDC 0121 Den Harrow – Future Brain (12")
- JDC 0122 Various – The JDC Mixer No. 10 (12")
- JDC 0123 Tyrants In Therapy – Sex Bomb / Boy (12")
- JDC 1001 Ice-T - Coldest Rap / Cold Wind Madness (12")
- JDC 12-1 Glass Family - The Crazy / Disco Concerto (12")
- JDC 12-11 Ann Joy - Love Now Hurt Later (12")
- JDC 12-12 Little Casper and The MX's - The Ultimate Warlord (12")
- JDC 12-4 Two Man Sound - Que Tal America (12")
- JDC 12-6 Taka Boom - Bring It Back (12")
- JDC 12-7 Fever - Standing In The Shadows Of Love (Remix) (12")
- JDC 12-8 Two Man Sound - La Musica Latina (12")
- JDC 12-9 'Lectric Funk - Shanghaied (12")
- JDC 2003 Captain Rapp - Bad Times (I Can't Stand It) (12")
- JDC 2018 Poetry 'N' Motion - Killer Dayton's (12", RP)
- JDC 2023 Stereo MD & DJ Weasul - Don't Make Me Mad (12")
- JDC 3451-2 Bollock Brothers - The Harley David / Son Of A Bitch (CD, Maxi)
- JDC 3452-2 Eddie Hazel Jams From The Heart (CD)
- JDC 429 Glass Family - The Crazy (7")
- JDC 62177 Glass Family - The Mr DJ, You Know How To Make Me Dance (LP)
- JDC/DOM-002 Tavares - C'est La Vie (12")
- M3-12 Glass Family - The Crazy / Disco Concerto (12")
- P 20584 Vaughan Mason & Crew / Young & Company - Bounce, Rock, Skate, Roll / I Like (What You're Doing to Me) (12")
