= Dragon Mob Records =

- Founded: 2002
- Founder: J-vibe, Hsky and Smax
- Genre: Hip-hop
- Country of origin: United States
- Official website: http://www.dragonmob.com

Dragon Mob Records is an East Los Angeles, California based hip-hop record label. It was created by music composer J-vibe, abstract artist Hsky and executive producer Smax in 2002. J-vibe and Smax had been in the music business with several other labels including Base 12 Records (1987), Soundshaft Music (1997), SR Records (2000) and eBboy Records (2000, when Hsky joined them).

== History ==
=== 2002 ===
Hsky advised J-vibe to create a hip-hop label to feature Latino and Asian rappers. Several Asian rappers and singers were contacted, but none follow-up. J-vibe is contracted to produce a Latin rap album for Brown Town Looters.

=== 2003 ===
J-vibe completed production of Brown Town Looters album "Busca Oro" for Balboa Musart Records. Many political problems occur with his co-producer, so J-vibe decides to concentrate on Dragon Mob Records. He gets a call from "Loyalty and Honor" who were having problems with the same co-producer. An agreement is made and "Loyalty and Honor" becomes the first Latino artist on Dragon Mob Records.

=== 2005 ===
J-vibe completed production of Loyalty and Honor's first album "World Coast." It includes guest performances by musicians such as Cheryl Cooley of Klymaxx and Citric of Brown Town Looters. One track from the album titled "Como Las Noticias" is licensed to the movie Dirty starring Cuba Gooding Jr.

=== 2007 ===
Dragon Mob Record's artist Loyalty and Honor record a collaborative track with Don Dinero titled "I Love To Hustle." Loyalty and Honor join Block Royal. Kleptomaniac records "One Life To Live" with Loyalty and Honor which is produced by Derxxx.

=== 2008 ===
Three tracks from Loyalty and Honor's unreleased "On The Rise" album get promotionally leaked by Gillete's Right Guard website "Buzz Bands."

== Artists ==
- Loyalty and Honor
- Pueblo Cafe
- Kleoptomaniac

== Albums ==
- World Coast (2005)
- On The Rise (2008)
