= One Track Mind (Egyptian Lover album) =

Studio album by Egyptian Lover
- Released: 1986
- Recorded: 1985–1986
- Genre: Electro
- Label: Egyptian Empire Records
- Producer: Egyptian Lover

Egyptian Lover chronology
On the Nile (1984)	One Track Mind (1986)	Filthy (1988)

Professional ratings
Review scores
Source	Rating
AllMusic	link

One Track Mind is the second album by rapper Egyptian Lover. The album was released in 1986 for Egyptian Empire Records and was produced by Egyptian Lover himself. The album reached #37 on the Billboard R&B albums chart and produced two charting singles, "The Lover" and "Freak-a-Holic".

== Track listing ==
1. "One Track Mind" – 5:26
2. "You're So Fine" – 2:36
3. "The Dark Side of Egypt" – 4:22
4. "Livin' on the Nile" – 1:11
5. "Freak-A-Holic" – 4:36
6. "The Lover" – 5:30
7. "The Alezby Inn" – 5:53
8. "Los Angeles" – 3:36
9. "Kinky Nation (Kingdom Kum)" – 3:18
