= Michele Rucci =

Michele Rucci is an Italian born neuroscientist and biomedical engineer who studies visual perception. He is a Professor of Brain and Cognitive Sciences and member of the Center for Visual Science at the University of Rochester.

== Biography ==
Rucci received Laurea (MA) and Ph.D. degrees in biomedical engineering from the University of Florence and the Sant'Anna School of Advanced Studies in Pisa, respectively. He trained as a Postdoctoral Fellow at The Neurosciences Institute in San Diego. He was then Professor of Psychological and Brain Sciences at Boston University.

He is primarily known for his work on active perception in humans and machines, particularly for his research on eye movements and for developing robotic systems controlled by computational models of neural pathways in the brain.

== Selected works ==
- Rucci M, Victor JD (2015). "The unsteady eye: an information processing stage, not a bug". Trends in Neurosciences. 38 (4): 195–206. doi:10.1016/j.tins.2015.01.005. PMC 4385455. PMID 25698649.
- Poletti M, Listorti C, Rucci M (2013). "Microsaccades compensate for non-uniform foveal vision". Current Biology. 23 (17): 1691–1695. doi:10.1016/j.cub.2013.07.007. PMC 3881259. PMID 23954428.
- Kuang X, Gibson M, Shi BE, Rucci M. (2012) Active vision during coordinated head/eye movements in a humanoid robot. IEEE Transactions on Robotics, 99:1-8.
- Kuang X, Poletti M, Victor JD, Rucci M (2012). "Temporal encoding of spatial information during active visual fixation". Current Biology. 22 (6): 510–514. Bibcode:2012CBio...22..510K. doi:10.1016/j.cub.2012.01.050. PMC 3332095. PMID 22342751.
- Ko HK, Poletti M, Rucci M (2010). "Microsaccades precisely relocate gaze in a high visual acuity task". Nature Neuroscience. 13 (12): 1549–1553. doi:10.1038/nn.2663. PMC 3058801. PMID 21037583.
- Rucci M, Iovin R, Poletti M, Santini F (2007). "Miniature eye movements enhance fine spatial detail". Nature. 447 (7146): 851–854. Bibcode:2007Natur.447..852R. doi:10.1038/nature05866. PMID 17568745. S2CID 4416740.
