= Rappers Rapp Records =

American record label

- Founded: 1981; 45 years ago
- Founder: Duffy Hooks III; Jerry Hooks Sr.
- Status: Defunct
- Distributor: Macola Record Co.; (U.S.)
- Genre: Hip-hop
- Country of origin: United States
- Location: Hollywood, California

Rappers Rapp Records (also known as The Rappers Rapp Disco Record Co.) was an American record label founded in 1981 by Duffy Hook III and Jerry Hooks Sr. and the first West Coast rap label. It was last run by Lee "DJ Flash" Johnson. The label's first release was the single "The Gigolo Rapp" by Disco Daddy & Captain Rapp in 1981. After the success of their first release, Hook began hosting auditions in Los Angeles and found their second act called The Rappers Rapp Group.

The Rappers Rap Group, which consisted of five L.A. rappers, MC Fosty, Lovin C, King MC, Macker-Moe, Mr Ice and DJ Flash from Taft, California, released their first single, "Rappers Rapp Theme", in 1982. One year later Rich Cason released "Year 2001 Boogie" on Rappers Rapp. With this record the style changed from the typical old school rap to an electronic wave sound with vocoders and rap. Rich Cason had a major influence on the release of "Magic Mike Theme", "Radio Activity Rapp", "Killer Groove" and "Bad Times (I Can't Stand It)". In 1986 The Brothers Supreme released the West Coast classic "We Can´t Be Held Back" on the Rappers Rapp Label.

== Former artists ==
Act	Year signed	Releases under the label
Duffy Hooks III	Founder	-
Jerry Hooks Sr.	Founder	-
Disco Daddy & Captain Rapp	1981	1
The Rappers Rapp Group	1982	1
Rich Cason	1983	1
The Brothers Supreme	1986	1
M.C. Fosty And Lovin' C	1984	1
Rich Cason And The Galactic Orchestra	1985	1

== See also ==
- List of record labels
