= Egyptian Lover =

American musician, DJ, and record producer

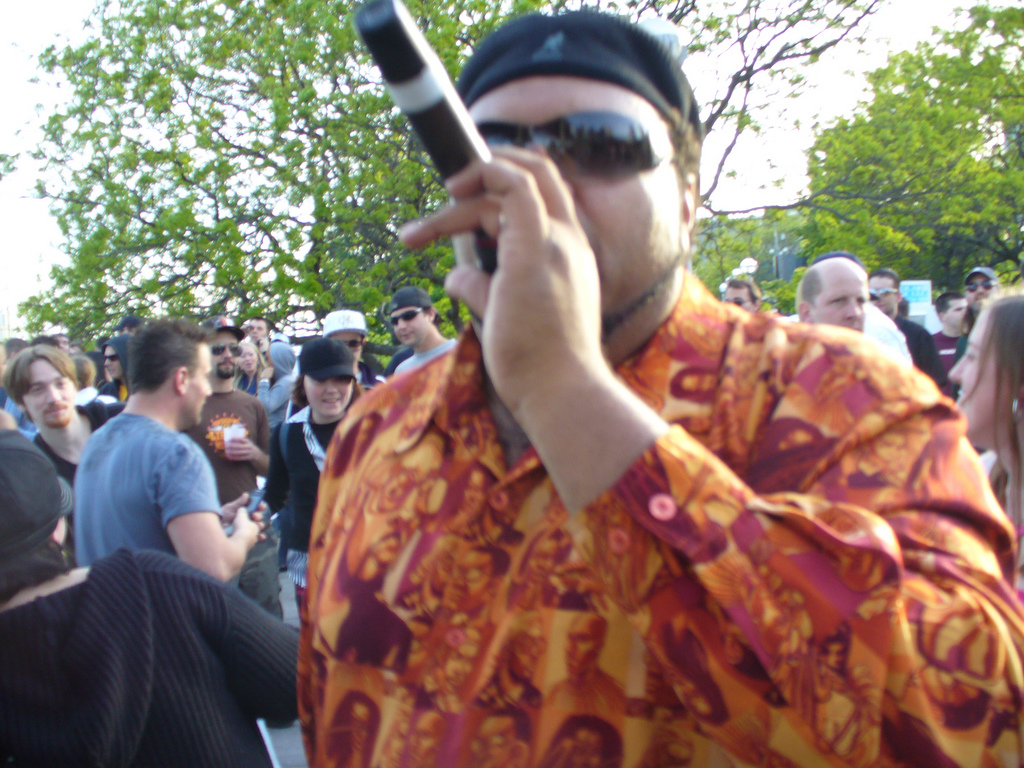
- Egyptian Lover performing in 2005

Background information
- Born: Gregory James Broussard; August 31, 1963 (age 63); Los Angeles, California, U.S.
- Origin: Los Angeles, California, U.S.
- Genres: Hip hop, electro
- Occupations: Musician, vocalist, producer, DJ, graphic artist
- Instruments: Vocals, synthesizers, drum machines, turntables
- Years active: Late 1970s–present
- Labels: Freak Beat Records, Egyptian Empire Records, NuBeat Records, Stones Throw Records

Gregory James Broussard (born August 31, 1963), known professionally as Egyptian Lover, is an American musician, vocalist, producer, DJ, and graphic artist. He was an early figure in the Los Angeles electro and hip hop scenes of the 1980s and is widely recognized for his pioneering use of the Roland TR-808 drum machine in rap and dance music. His original pen-and-ink drawings on 12-inch LP sleeves have been offered by Sotheby's and covered by independent music press. He was the subject of the 2025 book Egyptian Lover: On the Nile, a limited-edition volume documenting his career and the early Los Angeles electro scene.

== Early life ==
Broussard was born and raised in the Central-Alameda area of South Central Los Angeles, part of the historic South Los Angeles district and a major hub for early West Coast hip hop and electro-funk scenes during the late 1970s and early 1980s. During that period, as part of the Los Angeles Unified School District's court-ordered desegregation plan, students from his neighborhood, including Broussard, were bused to James Monroe High School in the San Fernando Valley. While in high school, Broussard began experimenting with a cassette deck and turntable to make what he later described as "Pause-Button Mix Tapes". He sold these to classmates, gaining an early reputation as a party DJ and performer.

He adopted the stage name "Egyptian Lover" in the early 1980s, drawing on ancient Egyptian imagery, mystique, and romantic iconography that circulated in early hip hop, electro, and club culture.

== Career ==
=== Beginnings: Uncle Jam's Army and the Radio Crew ===
Broussard began performing in 1982 as a member of Uncle Jam's Army, a Los Angeles party and performance collective that organized large-scale dances at venues such as the Los Angeles Sports Arena. Founded by Rodger Clayton (Mr. Prinze) and Gid Martin, the crew's core DJs included Broussard (The Egyptian Lover), DJ Bobcat, Bleeps, and Dave "Dr. Funkenstein". Their independent 12-inch singles, including "Dial-A-Freak" and "Yes, Yes, Yes", were among the earliest West Coast electro-rap releases distributed directly by local DJs.

In 1983, while still performing with Uncle Jam's Army, Broussard also appeared regularly at the Radio Club ("The Radio"), a Los Angeles venue that became a hub for hip-hop, dance, and DJ culture. The club brought together many of the same performers later featured in the documentary Breakin' ’n’ Enterin’, including Ice-T, The Glove, and Super AJ. For the film, these regulars were formally credited as The Radio Crew, a group created specifically for the production.

Released later that year, Breakin' ’n’ Enterin’ showcased the Los Angeles hip hop and dance scene centered on the Radio Club and its performers, with Broussard featured among the film’s principal DJs. The documentary later inspired the 1984 feature film Breakin'.

In 1985, Broussard composed the electro soundtrack for the television film The Pilot, featuring b-boy Adolph "Oz Rock" Alvarez.

=== Egyptian Empire Records and 1980s output ===
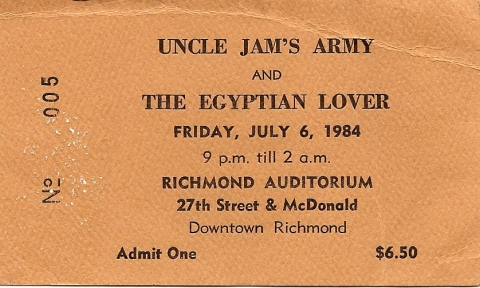
Ticket for Uncle Jamm's Army and The Egyptian Lover concert, July 6, 1984.

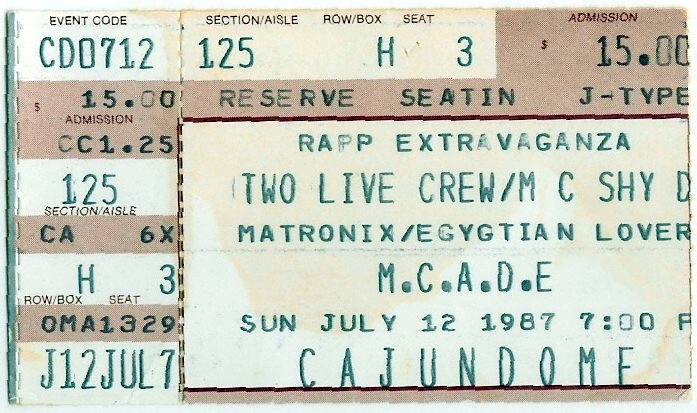
Ticket for Rapp Extravaganza, July 12, 1987.

In 1984 Broussard founded Egyptian Empire Records, which released his own electro-rap singles and albums built around the TR-808 drum machine. His debut album, On the Nile (1984), included the single "Egypt, Egypt", a defining West Coast electro track.

He followed with One Track Mind (1986) and Filthy (1988). Filthy was released on NuBeat Records, a Priority Records imprint, making him the first rap artist signed to Priority Records. Broussard also issued material under the alias Jamie Jupitor.

=== 1990s and 2000s ===
In the early 1990s Broussard released Get Into It (1990), Pyramix (1993), and Back from the Tomb (1994). He returned with Platinum Pyramids (2006), blending 1980s textures with early-2000s funk. He continued touring with vintage gear and the TR-808.

=== Revival and Stones Throw era (2010s–present) ===
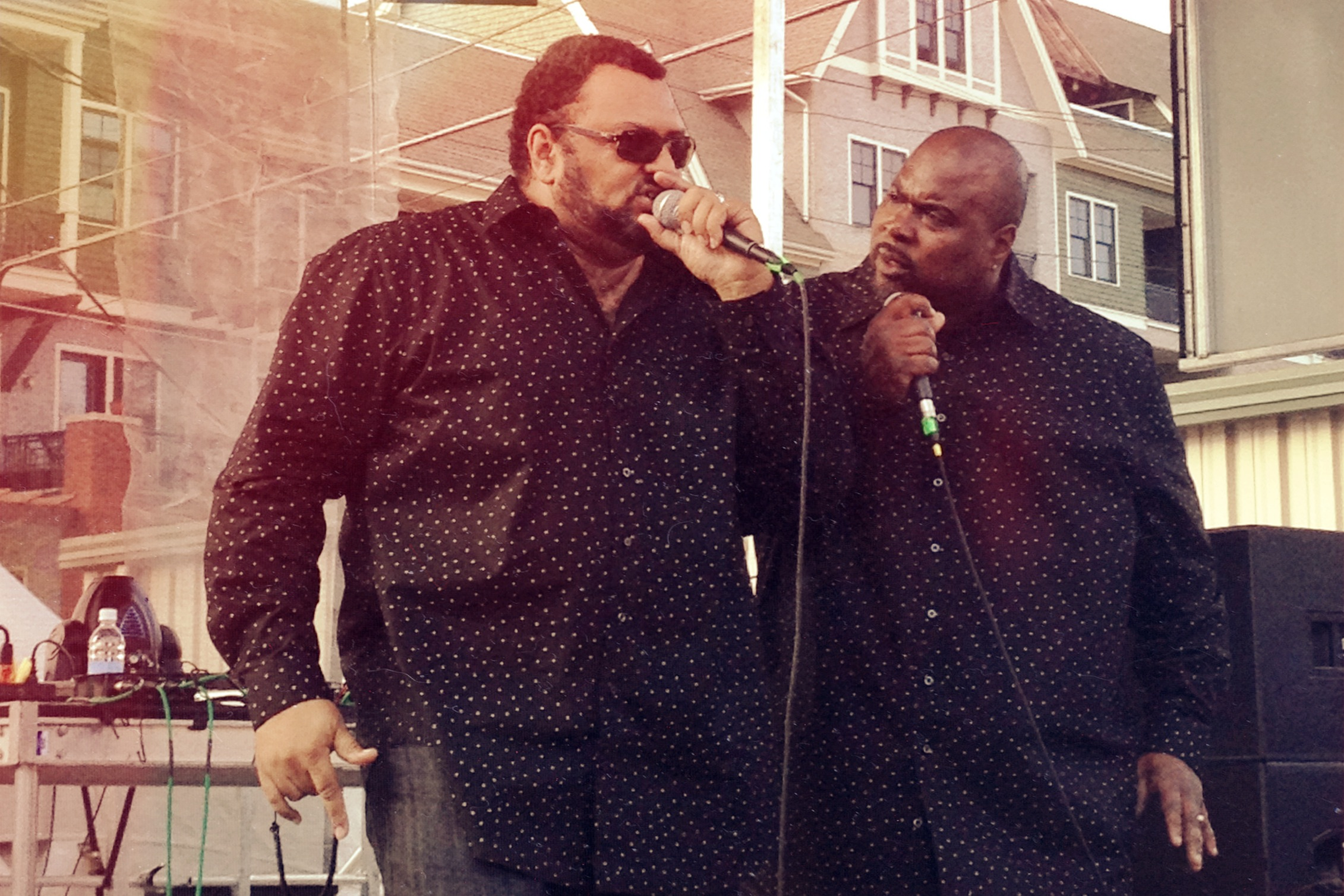
Egyptian Lover with Gerald "Bo" Brown performing at Moogfest, April 25, 2014.

Interest in his catalog resurged in the 2010s through reissues and festival appearances. In 2015 Stones Throw Records reissued "Egypt, Egypt" as Egypt, Egypt (Pyramid Edition), a Record Store Day release recreating his 1984 West Coast electro classic. The edition was pressed on triangle-shaped white vinyl with a thick black board sleeve featuring gold foil printing and magnetic 8-panel design folding into a free-standing pyramid. The package was described as a tribute to Broussard’s early electro era, backed with “Girls” – an instrumental bonus-beats version of the track from On the Nile (1984). That same year, Broussard released 1984 (2015) on his label.

In 2016 Stones Throw issued 1983–1988, a four-LP box set with a 20-page booklet housed in an all-black case with gold foil printing. The set included liner notes by music journalist, Jeff Weiss, track histories written by Egyptian Lover, and recordings sourced from the original master tapes. It featured extended and alternate versions of classic singles, curated by Peanut Butter Wolf. That year, under his Jamie Jupitor alias, Broussard released "Future Computer" on The Bass Academy, Vol. 2.

He followed with 1985 (2018), featuring collaborations with DJ Qbert, Cozmo D of Newcleus, and Juan Atkins of Cybotron. The 1985 cycle coincided with the 35th anniversary of Egyptian Empire Records.

In 2020 he released Pyramix Party, a collection of newly re-recorded and remixed versions of his 1980s material. He continued with 1986 (2020) and 1987 (2025). He remains active as a performer and producer as of late 2025.

=== Visual art ===
Broussard produces hand-drawn pen-and-ink artwork on 12-inch record sleeves, often featuring Egyptian iconography, turntables, boomboxes, extraterrestrial motifs, numerology, and references to the TR-808. A set of thirty-six signed drawings was offered by Sotheby's in its September 2020 Hip Hop sale (Lot 94; estimate USD 10,000–15,000). Contemporary music press reported on the auction, noting the inclusion of Egyptian Lover materials alongside other hip hop artifacts. Separately, the Metropolitan Museum of Art lists the 1986 video work Freak-A-Holic and the 1984 record On the Nile under the artist name The Egyptian Lover in its Modern and Contemporary Art department, indicating institutional cataloging of his creative output beyond audio releases.

=== Book ===
In 2025 Broussard was the subject of Egyptian Lover: On the Nile, a 200-page clothbound art and photo book created by curator and designer Bob Dominguez and published by Beyond the Streets. The book chronicles the rise of Los Angeles electro and hip-hop scenes surrounding Broussard’s 1984 debut album On the Nile. It features archival photographs, flyers, handwritten lyrics, and reflections from peers including Ice-T, Arabian Prince, Chris “The Glove” Taylor, Cozmo D, Moodymann, Dam-Funk, J Rocc, and David Broussard.

The first edition was limited to 808 copies, measuring 8.25 × 10.25 inches, printed by Oddi Sales, and issued with ISBN 979-8-218-73197-7. A launch pop-up event took place on September 6, 2025, with the book becoming widely available by late October 2025 through Beyond the Streets and Stones Throw’s online stores.

== Musical influences and style ==
Broussard has cited Kraftwerk, Prince, Zapp and Roger Troutman, Afrika Bambaataa, and Dean Martin as key influences. He credited Kraftwerk’s "Numbers" as a model for TR-808–based production, Prince and Troutman for vocal and performance style, Bambaataa’s "Planet Rock" as a blueprint for electro-rap, and Martin’s phrasing for his smooth vocal tone.

== Equipment ==
=== Core synthesizers and drum machines ===
- Roland TR-808 Rhythm Composer, central to his production style.
- Roland Jupiter-8, used for polyphonic leads and pads.
- Roland SH-101, used for basslines and arpeggios alongside the TR-808.
- Roland SVC-350 Vocoder, used for robotic vocal textures in early electro.

He has worked at Skip Saylor, Encore, Rusk Sound Studios, Ameraycan, Record One, Paramount Studios, Record Plant, Larrabee Studios, Clear Lake, and other Los Angeles recording facilities. His studio work uses analog mixing desks and tape-based production methods with no MIDI sequencing. Live performances employ Technics SL-1200 turntables and original TR-808 units, maintaining a stage format close to his 1980s shows.

== Discography ==
=== Studio albums ===
- On the Nile (1984, Egyptian Empire Records)
- One Track Mind (1986, Egyptian Empire Records)
- Filthy (1988, NuBeat Records)
- Get Into It (1990, Egyptian Empire Records)
- Back from the Tomb (1994, Egyptian Empire Records)
- Platinum Pyramids (2006, Egyptian Empire Records)
- 1984 (2015, Egyptian Empire Records)
- 1985 (2018, Egyptian Empire Records)
- 1986 (2020, Egyptian Empire Records)
- 1987 (2025, Egyptian Empire Records)

=== Compilation and archival albums ===
- King of Ecstasy: His Greatest Hits Album (1989, Egyptian Empire Records, an 8-track compilation covering recordings from 1984–1988 including “Sexy Style (Greatest Hits Dub Mix)”, “My House (On the Nile) (Greatest Hits Mix)”, “Egypt, Egypt (12″ Original Mix)”, and others)
- Pyramix (1993, Egyptian Empire Records, remix and compilation album featuring digitally segued versions of earlier electro tracks including "Dance", "Egypt, Egypt", "Planet E (Remix)", and "Get High (Get X’d, Get Drunk, Get Sex’d)", recorded 1983–1993)
- 1983–1988 (2016, Stones Throw Records, 4×LP box set with 20-page booklet in an all-black case with gold foil print, featuring liner notes by Jeff Weiss and detailed track history by The Egyptian Lover. Recordings taken from the original master tapes covering works from 1983–1988.)
- Instrumentals and Demos (Limited Edition) (2018, Egyptian Empire Records, limited-edition digital and collector release featuring over 30 unreleased instrumentals, bonus beats, demos, and remixes spanning recordings from the early 1980s through 2018)
- Pyramix Party (2020, Egyptian Empire Records, continuous non-stop mix album featuring newly recorded, remixed, and reimagined versions of The Egyptian Lover's classic 1980s tracks, produced with updated analog equipment and extended arrangements)

=== Singles and EPs ===
The first Egyptian Lover 12-inch records were released on Freak Beat Records. The initial 12-inch featured "Egypt, Egypt", "And My Beat Goes Boom", "What Is a D.J. If He Can't Scratch?", and "The Ultimate Scratch". The second 12-inch, "Computer Love (Sweet Dreams)" / "And My Beat Goes Boom (Long Version)", followed shortly afterward. Both used the same catalog numbering system later continued by Egyptian Empire Records, which succeeded Freak Beat as Egyptian Lover's primary label.

- "Egypt, Egypt" / "And My Beat Goes Boom" / "What Is A D.J. If He Can't Scratch?" / "The Ultimate Scratch" (1984, Freak Beat Records)
- "Computer Love (Sweet Dreams)" / "And My Beat Goes Boom (Long Version)" (1984, Freak Beat Records)
- "Dubb Girls" (1985, Egyptian Empire Records)
- "Dance" (1985, Egyptian Empire Records)
- "Girls" / "Voices" (1985, Egyptian Empire Records)
- "You're So Fine" / "E-Rap (Holding It Down)" / "Scratch Force One" / "The Ultimate Scratch II" (1986, Egyptian Empire Records)
- "The Lover (Long Version) / I Want To Make Love" (1986, Egyptian Empire Records)
- "Freak-A-Holic (Re-mix) / Livin' On The Nile (Extended Club Re-mix)" (1987, Egyptian Empire Records)
- "The Alezby Inn (Remodeled Version)" / "Sexy Style (Sexy Ain't It?)" (1987, Egyptian Empire Records)
- "Get Into It (12-inch Mix)" / "Dance Music (Club Mix)" (1987, Egyptian Empire Records)
- "D.S.L.'s (Lipstick Mix)" / "I Want Cha (Pyra Mix)" (1988, NuBeat Records)
- "Baddest Beats Around (Extended Mix)" / "Filthy (Remix)" (1988, NuBeat Records)
- "Dial-A-Freak (10 Minute Remix)" / "Yes, Yes, Yes" – Uncle Jamm's Army featuring The Egyptian Lover (1988, Dunk Yer Funk / Freak Beat Records)
- "Let's Get It On (Long Version) / Let's Get It On (House Mix)" (1990, Egyptian Empire Records)
- "Egypt Rave '93" / "Egypt, Egypt (Original Mix)" / "Planet E (Re-Mix)" / "Get High (Get X'd, Get Drunk, Get Sex'd)" (1993, Egyptian Empire Records)
- "Bounce That Bootie" / "Gotta Have Ya" (1994, Egyptian Empire Records)
- "Party" / "Dance Floor" (2005, Egyptian Empire Records)
- "Electro Pharaoh" / "Keep It Hot (Re-mix)" (2009, Egyptian Empire Records)
- "Egypt, Egypt" / "Girls" (2015, Stones Throw Records, limited white triangle vinyl with gold-foil pyramid sleeve)
- "Killin' It (Remix)" / "Tryin To Tell Ya" (2016, Egyptian Empire Records)
- "I Need a Freak" / "My House on the Nile (Long Version)" (2017, Egyptian Empire Records)
- "Seduced (ReMix)" / "Belly Dance" (2017, Egyptian Empire Records)
- "808 Beats Volume 1" (2018, Egyptian Empire Records)
- "Beyond the Galaxy" feat. DJ Q-bert / "5 Cent Camel Ride (Long Version)" (2019, Egyptian Empire Records)
- "Into the Future (Model Citizens ReModel)" (2019, Dominance Electricity, from Are Friends Electro? compilation by Model Citizens, DE-030, 2×12-inch, CD, digital)
- "Freak a Holic (Alternate Universe Mix)" / "2 The Extreme (Long Version)" (2020, Egyptian Empire Records)
- "Freaky Girl (Extended Version)" / "We The Freaks (Extended Version)" (2021, Egyptian Empire Records)
- "Lose Control (Long Version)" / "Vocoder Jam" (2022, Egyptian Empire Records)
- "The Freak Pack" (2023, Egyptian Empire Records, 2×12-inch double vinyl combining "I Need A Freak" / "My House On The Nile", "Freaky Girl", and "We The Freaks")
- "Egypt, Egypt" / "Girls (40th Anniversary)" (2024, Egyptian Empire Records, remastered reissue of the 1984 release featuring a new mix of "Girls", issued in special 40th-anniversary vinyl editions with various color pressings and packaging)
- "Emotions" / "Dirty Passionate Yell" (2024, Egyptian Empire Records)

==== Uncle Jamm's Army and related projects ====
- "Dial-A-Freak" / "Yes, Yes, Yes" – Uncle Jamm's Army (1983, Freak Beat Records)
- "Naughty Boy" / "What's Your Sign (Of The Zodiac Baby Doll)" – Uncle Jamm's Army (1985, Freak Beat Records)

==== As Jamie Jupitor ====
- "Computer Power" (1985, Egyptian Empire Records)
- "Future Computer" (2016, The Bass Academy)
