= Rodney-O & Joe Cooley =

American hip hop group

Rodney-O & Joe Cooley, consisting of rapper Rodney Oliver, also known as "Rodney O", DJ Joe Cooley (August 15, 1965) and Jeffrey Page, also known as "General Jeff", is an American rap group from Southern California. Rodney O, from Riverside, and Joe Cooley, from Compton, and General Jeff, from Los Angeles. Best known for tracks such as "Everlasting Bass", "Cooley High", and "This is for the Homies". At the height of their popularity, the group toured with MC Lyte, N.W.A, Kool Moe Dee and Grandmaster Flash. The group would gain more popularity in South Florida than their native Southern California, giving them a pioneering role in Miami bass.

In 2015, Rolling Stone named "Everlasting Bass" as one of the 20 greatest West Coast Rap Songs released prior to N.W.A's 1989 album Straight Outta Compton. After over a decade of silence, the group announced that they were planning a new album in 2011. The album was tentatively titled Joe And Me, but only the single "That Supa Radio" materialized. Their single "U Don't Hear Me Tho" was sampled by HXG in "Uzi Work".

== Discography ==
=== Albums ===
- 1988 Me And Joe (Egyptian Empire) U.S. No. 187
- 1990 Three the Hard Way (Atlantic) U.S. No. 128
- 1991 Get Ready to Roll (Ichiban Records)
- 1993 Fuck New York (Note: Spelled as F__k New York.) (Psychotic)
- 1995 Everlasting Hits: The Best Of Rodney O & Joe Cooley (React)
- 1998 The Final Chapter (React America)
- 1999 Veteran's Day (Kritical)

=== Charting singles ===
Year	Title	Billboard Hot 100	Rap	Album
1989	"This Is for the Homies"	—	17	Me and Joe
1990	"Say It Loud"	—	4	Three the Hard Way
1991	"Get Ready to Roll"	—	19	Get Ready to Roll
1993	"Humps for the Blvd."	84	10	Fuck New York
1993	"U Don't Hear Me Tho'"	93	—	Fuck New York
