= West Coast hip-hop =

American regional musical subgenre

- Stylistic origins: East Coast hip-hop; old-school hip-hop; gangsta rap; funk; soul; psychedelic funk
- Cultural origins: Late 1970s, Los Angeles & Bay Area, California, U.S.A.
- Typical instruments: DJ equipments; turntables; DJ mixer; music workstation; sampler; sequencer; drum machine; synthesizer; electric piano; electric guitar; electric bass guitar

Fusion genres
- G-funk; Mobb; Hyphy

Regional scenes
- Los Angeles; Compton; Long Beach; Oakland

Other topics
- East Coast hip-hop; East Coast–West Coast hip-hop rivalry; golden age hip-hop; hip-hop (subculture); Hip-hop in the Pacific Northwest; list of artists; list of record labels; list of Los Angeles rappers

West Coast hip-hop is a regional genre of hip-hop music that encompasses any artists or music that originated in the West Coast of the United States. West Coast hip-hop began to dominate from a radio play and sales standpoint during the early to-mid 1990s with the birth of G-funk and the emergence of record labels such as Suge Knight and Dr. Dre's Death Row Records, Ice Cube's Lench Mob Records, the continued success of Eazy-E's Ruthless Records, Dr. Dre's Aftermath Entertainment, and many others. Though the term "West Coast hip hop" may also be used to describe Northwest hip-hop and other movements from the Western U.S., it is primarily associated with the state of California, especially Los Angeles and the San Francisco Bay Area.

== History ==
African American communities of the Bay Area and southern California emerged as new bases of hip-hop culture in the 1980s. Hispanics in the Los Angeles area have played a significant role in West Coast hip-hop culture.

=== Early years ===
Several events laid the foundations for West Coast hip-hop, long before the emergence of West Coast rappers such as Ice-T, Mellow Man Ace, Too Short, Kid Frost and Eazy-E—or even before the emergence of rap itself. According to Syd Caesar, "a cataclysmic event helped give rise to it out West: the Watts riots of 1965." In 1967, Budd Schulberg founded a creative space in Los Angeles entitled Watts Writers Workshop, intended to help the people of the Watts neighborhood and provide a place for them to express themselves freely; one group to emerge from the workshop was the proto-rap group The Watts Prophets.

Throughout the 1960s and 1970s, political and social justice movements in the San Francisco Bay Area inspired the emergence and growth of hip-hop culture in the region. The Bay Area developed a unique style of break dancing, and graffiti art sprayed along city streets and buildings, similar to what was expressed in The Bronx on subway cars and abandoned structures. From the inspiration of funk music, to the political and social movements that were energized by the Black Panther Party (founded in Oakland), hip-hop music had strong roots in the Bay.

In the late 1970s in Los Angeles, Alonzo Williams, a young disc jockey from Compton, California formed a partnership with another DJ named Rodger Clayton from Los Angeles, California who created a promotion company called Unique Dreams that would hire Williams to DJ at local events. The two eventually went their separate ways: Williams started a group called the World Class Wreckin' Cru and became the house DJs at a local nightclub called Eve's After Dark while Clayton launched what would perhaps be the foremost successful mobile DJ crew in the region by the name of Uncle Jamm's Army that would host parties by top DJs for thousands of people at large venues. Other smaller DJ and party crews emerged around this time, hoping to establish themselves in the area. Unlike their East Coast counterparts, the Hip-Hop sound emerging from Southern California was more fast-paced and influenced by electronic music. This could be largely credited to the fact that the local West Coast hip-hop scene revolved more around DJing than rapping. A localized dance sub-culture later came out of this party scene, which was highlighted on a national scale on such motion pictures as Breakin'. Breakdancing, popping and locking gave the Los Angeles music scene some of its earliest credibility outside the region. Further attention came to the West Coast as Uncle Jamm's Army began inviting such well-known East Coast Hip-Hop acts such as Whodini and Run-DMC to their functions.

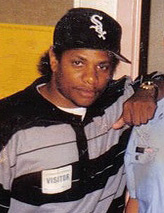
Eazy-E, member of N.W.A, one of the first gangster rap groups based in Compton

Another early landmark occurred in 1981, when Duffy Hooks launched the first West Coast rap label, Rappers Rapp Records, inspired by Sugar Hill Records in New York. Its first act was the duo of Disco Daddy and Captain Rapp, whose debut single was "The Gigolo Rapp" which was also released in 1981. The song became a minor success but failed to gain much radio play. Many other Hip-Hop songs recorded in California were released during the early 1980s, but many of them received little or no radio play. Captain Rapp created the classic West Coast song released in 1983 called, "Bad Times (I Can't Stand It)", which is a politically conscious response to Grandmaster Flash's "The Message" arranged by the legendary production duo of Jimmy Jam & Terry Lewis and Rich Cason. Clayton's group, Uncle Jamm's Army, released their first single, "Dial-a-Freak", and in 1984 Egyptian Lover released his On the Nile album, which includes the popular 12" single "Egypt Egypt". Members of Uncle Jamm's Army and the World Class Wreckin' Cru, including Dr. Dre, The Unknown DJ, Egyptian Lover, Ice-T and Kid Frost would later go on to help define the early West Coast hip-hop sound throughout the 1980s.

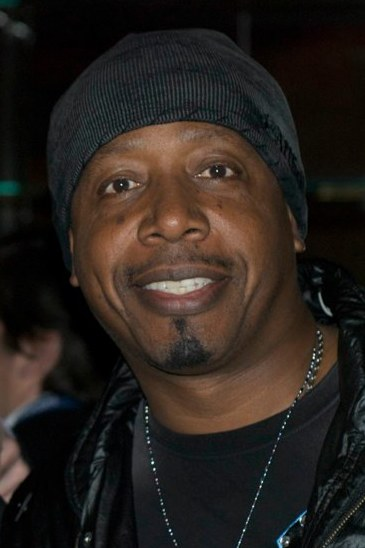
Oakland rapper MC Hammer

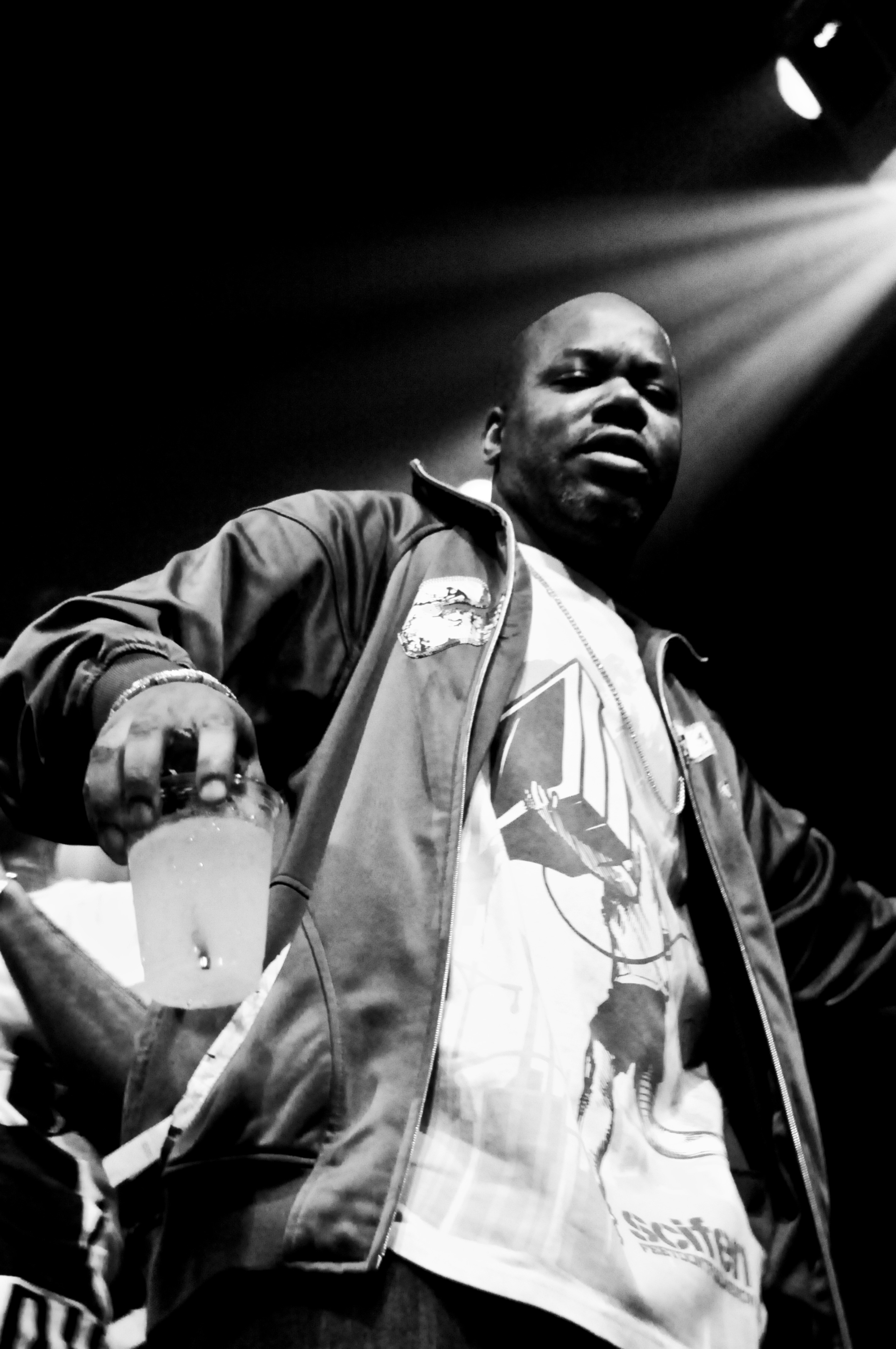
Bay Area rapper Too Short

During this period, one of the most significant factors in the spread of West Coast hip-hop was the radio station 1580 KDAY AM, which was the first radio station in the world to play rap/hip-hop music 24 hours a day because of Assistant Program Director/Music Director and Radio Personality Greg "Mack Attack" Mack.

In the 1980s to mid-1990s, inspired both by the region's history of activism and by funk music, Bay Area artists popularized the "pimp rap" subgenre, focused on rhythmic, funky beats that cut across genres. Artists like Too Short emerged from this dance-oriented hip-hop movement, a predecessor to the hyphy movement of the 2000s.

=== Late 1980s and 1990s ===
Ice-T is known as one of the pioneers of West Coast hip-hop and gangsta rap, with songs such as "6 in the Mornin", released in 1986, demonstrating the unique style of the west coast. In 1988, Ice-T released the R&B hit "I'm Your Pusher", and following this was Too Short's breakthrough album Life is... Too Short. Tone Loc's debut album Lōc-ed After Dark was released on January 23, 1989, and reached number one on the Billboard 200 charts, with the album's lead single "Wild Thing" peaking at #2 on the Billboard Hot 100. Two days after the release of Lōc-ed After Dark, N.W.A released its debut album Straight Outta Compton. Focusing on life and adversities in Compton, California, a notoriously rough area which had gained a reputation for gang violence, Straight Outta Compton was released by group member Eazy-E's record label Ruthless Records. As well as establishing a basis for the popularity of gangsta rap, the album drew much attention to West Coast hip-hop, especially the Los Angeles scene. In particular, the controversial "Fuck tha Police" and the ensuing censorship attracted substantial media coverage and public attention. Following the dissolution of N.W.A due to in-fighting, the group's members Eazy-E, Dr. Dre, Ice Cube and MC Ren would later become platinum-selling solo artists in the 1990s. Ice Cube released some of the West Coast's most critically acclaimed albums, such as 1990's AmeriKKKa's Most Wanted and 1991's Death Certificate, as well as making film and television appearances such as in John Singleton's Boyz n the Hood in 1991.

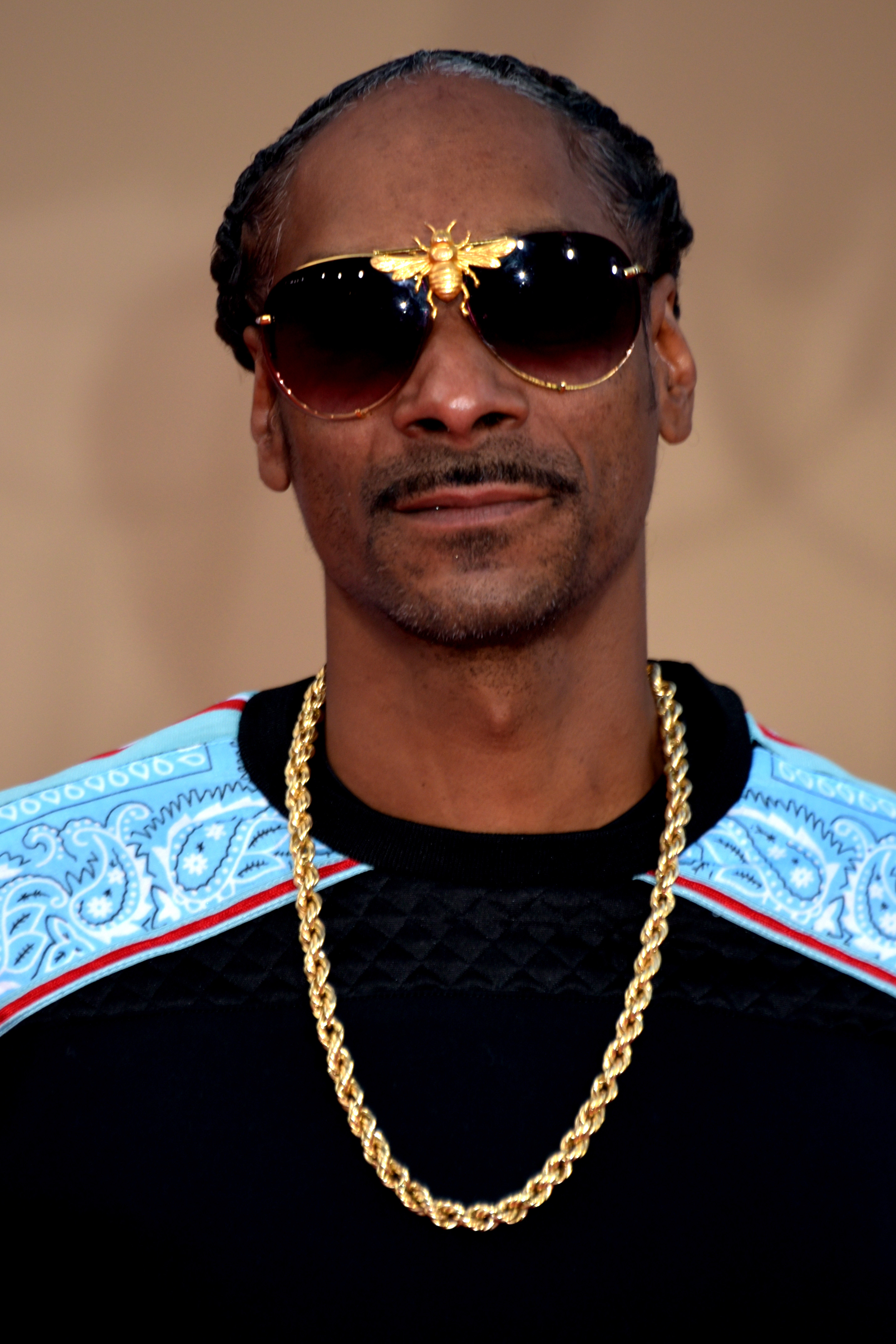
Long Beach-based rapper Snoop Dogg

The early 1990s was a period in which Hip-Hop went from strength to strength. Tupac Shakur's debut album 2Pacalypse Now was released in 1991, demonstrating a social awareness, with attacks on social injustice such as racism, police brutality, poverty, crime, drug and teenage pregnancy. This album featured 3 singles: "Brenda's Got a Baby", "Trapped" and "If My Homie Calls". 2Pacalypse Now was certified Gold by the Recording Industry Association of America (RIAA) on April 19, 1995. Shakur's music and philosophy was rooted in various philosophies and approaches, including the Black Panther Party, Black nationalism, egalitarianism and liberty. Tupac sold over 75 million records, being regarded as one of the greatest rappers of all time and a pioneer of West Coast rap.

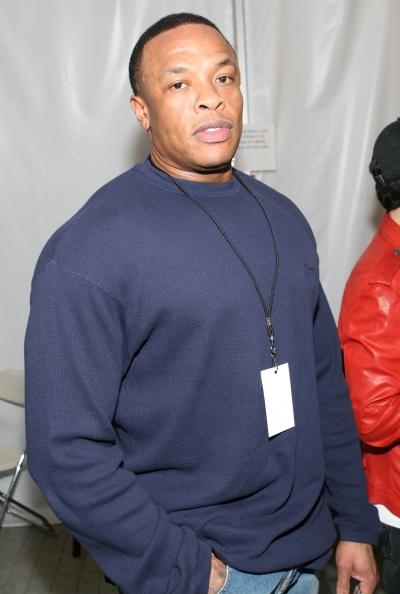
Compton rapper and producer Dr. Dre

Also in 1991, Suge Knight founded Death Row Records which became a record label powerhouse throughout the 1990s. In 1992, Dr. Dre released his solo debut, The Chronic; this marked the birth of the G-funk sound that became a hallmark of the West Coast sound in the 1990s, with the album's lead single "Nuthin' but a 'G' Thang" peaking at #2 on the US Billboard Hot 100.

The city of Long Beach arrived to the hip-hop scene in the early 1990s with artists such as Snoop Doggy Dogg and Tha Dogg Pound, both signed to Death Row, with releases such as Doggystyle (1993) and Dogg Food (1995). Both albums becoming huge sellers and being critically acclaimed and helped make a mark in establishing Long Beach in the hip-hop scene. Another artist who helped establish Long Beach was Warren G with his release Regulate... G Funk Era (1994). He founded his record label G-Funk Entertainment in 1995 and helped promote artists also from Long Beach such as the Twinz and The Dove Shack.

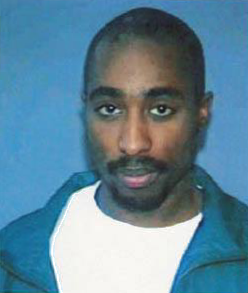
2Pac

As for Death Row, success kept coming throughout the 1990s with 2Pac's All Eyez on Me (1996) also becoming a huge seller and becoming critically acclaimed. 2Pac gained hits California Love" and "Live and Die in LA". Also in the early-to-mid 1990s, the group Cypress Hill made a big impact on the scene with their albums such as their debut studio album of the same name and Black Sunday. They are considered to be among the main progenitors of West Coast rap and hip-hop. Other popular artists and groups from this period include The Pharcyde (known for their albums Bizarre Ride II the Pharcyde and Labcabincalifornia), Souls of Mischief (known for their album 93 'til Infinity), Ahmad (known for his song Back in the Day), Xzibit (known for his album At the Speed of Life) and Ras Kass (known for his album Soul on Ice).

=== 2000s and 2010s ===
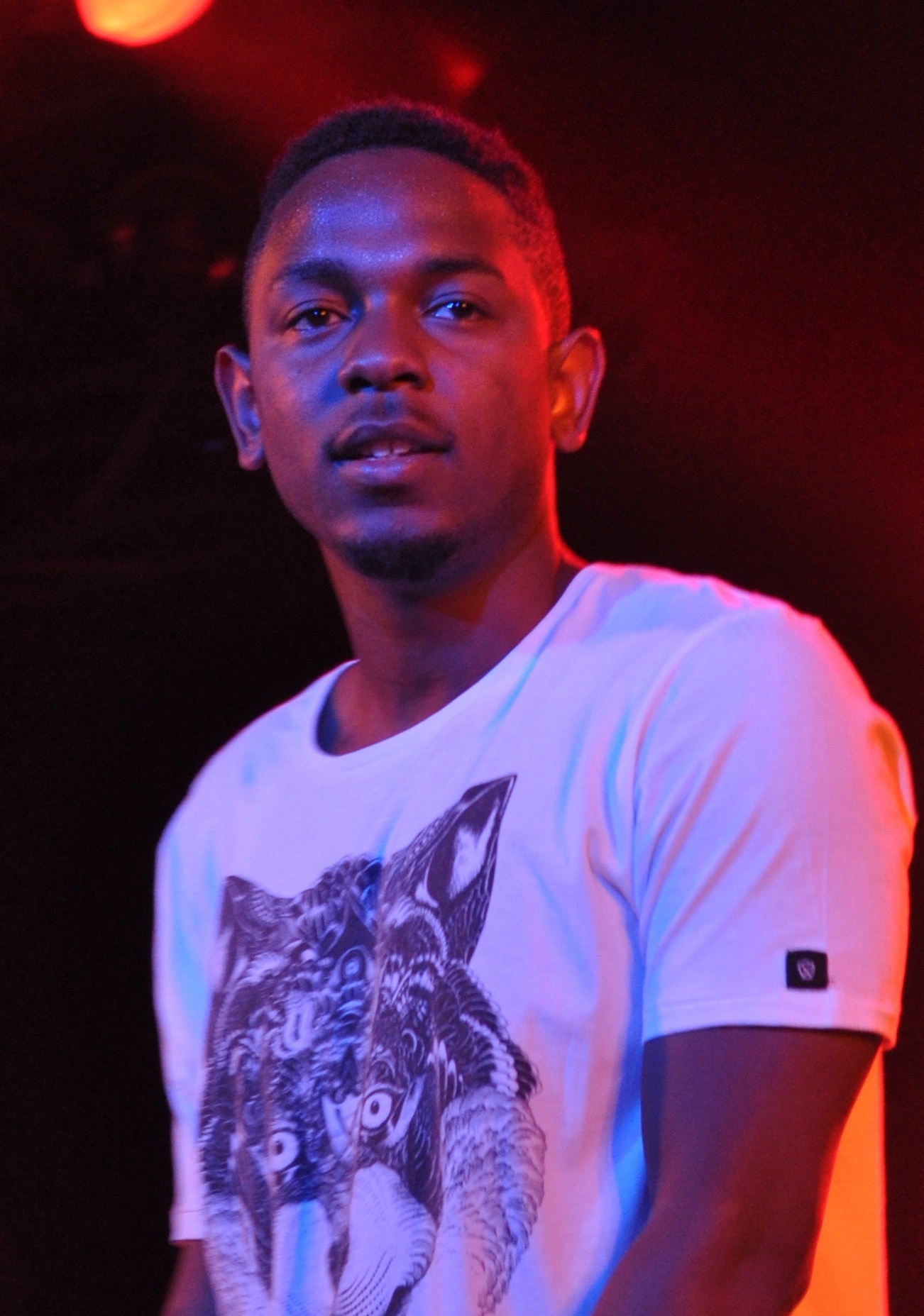
Compton rapper Kendrick Lamar

West Coast hip-hop's position in the mainstream dwindled greatly in the late 1990s and 2000s, with competition not only from the East Coast but also from emerging scenes in the Midwest (Chicago, Detroit, St. Louis) and the South (Atlanta, Houston, New Orleans). There were a few notable exceptions, particularly from established stars, such as Dr. Dre's 2001, Xzibit's Restless, Snoop Dogg's No Limit Top Dogg and Tha Last Meal albums. However, the trend soon changed. Although gangsta rap was still popular on the West Coast in the 2000s, the West Coast sound became more designed for nightclubs with the rise of the Bay Area's hyphy scene, featuring flamboyant raps and explicit references to sex and drugs, pioneered by artists like Mac Dre and E-40, who found a substantial audience with his 1995 album In a Major Way; he found even greater success with the song "Tell Me When to Go" in 2006, featuring Oakland rapper Keak da Sneak.

Bay area rapper Too Short, already well known for his collaborations with artists such as Tupac Shakur and The Notorious B.I.G, found a new lease on life with the hyphy scene, his 16th studio album Blow the Whistle in 2006 debuting at number 14 on the Billboard 200. The Game also brought attention back to the West Coast with his double platinum album, The Documentary, as did Xzibit's platinum certified Restless album, and gold certified albums Man vs. Machine and Weapons of Mass Destruction. Artists from the 1990s such as Snoop Dogg and Ice Cube and groups such as the Tha Dogg Pound and Westside Connection continued to release albums throughout the 2000s and had success but did not garner the same level of fame as they had experienced in the 1990s. Throughout the 2000s, several peripheral West Coast hip-hop artists such as Ya Boy, Glasses Malone, Juice, SKG (Suge Knight Girl) Helecia Choyce, Crooked I, 40 Glocc, Slim the Mobster, Bishop Lamont and Mistah F.A.B. collaborated with big-name artists such as Dr. Dre, Kurupt, Daz Dillinger, The Game, E-40 and Snoop Dogg.

In the early to mid-2010s, the West Coast had also seen a resurgence with hyphy as well as a transition to an uptempo and club-oriented type of Pop Rap.

Producer DJ Mustard had pioneered the "ratchet" music movement, a production style that has snowballed into the mainstream. DJ Mustard played a role in bringing West Coast hip-hop back to national attention through the 2010s. He gained huge popularity throughout 2011 to 2014, producing a number of popular artists' singles, including Tyga's "Rack City", 2 Chainz's "I'm Different", Young Jeezy's "R.I.P.", B.o.B's "HeadBand", YG's "My Nigga" and "Who Do You Love?", Ty Dolla Sign's "Paranoid", Kid Ink's "Show Me" and Trey Songz's "Na Na". Mustard also released his debut mixtape, Ketchup, in 2013, further solidifying his ratchet sound, which follows its G-funk and hyphy predecessors.

Other more peripheral acts that achieved moderate, cult following success in the mainstream include Lil B, who built a strong fan base via social media outlets such as Twitter, YouTube, and MySpace, and has recorded both solo and with The Pack.

That same year, Black Hippy's own Kendrick Lamar 2012 release, Good Kid, M.A.A.D City, was met with rave reviews and was featured on many critics' end-of-year lists. The album was nominated Album of the Year at the 56th Annual Grammy Awards, marking the first time any West Coast hip-hop was nominated for award. In 2014, Schoolboy Q debuted at no.1 on the Billboard 200 with 139,000 copies sold. YG's My Krazy Life debuted at #2 on the US Billboard 200 with 61,000 copies sold.

=== 2020s ===
On June 19, 2024, Juneteenth, Kendrick Lamar hosted The Pop Out: Ken & Friends concert following his highly publicized feud with Drake, noted as a celebration of the West Coast.

== See also ==
- Culture of California
- East Coast–West Coast hip-hop rivalry
- List of Los Angeles rappers
- List of northern California rappers
- List of West Coast hip-hop artists
- List of West Coast hip-hop record labels
- Music of California
- Northwestern hip-hop
- Bay Area hip-hop
