= Uncle Jamm's Army =

American hip hop and electro-funk collective from Los Angeles

- Also known as: UJA
- Origin: Los Angeles, California, U.S.
- Genres: Funk, hip hop, electro
- Years active: 1978–1988
- Labels: Freak Beat; Dunk Yer Funk
- Members: None
- Past members: Rodger Clayton †; Gid Martin; Tony Martin; Greg Martin; Dr. Funkenstein †; Bleebs; Egyptian Lover; Ice-T; DJ Bobcat; DJ Pooh; Arabian Prince; Joe Cooley; DJ Kittkatt; Paul "Shadow" Neal

Uncle Jamm's Army was an American party and performance collective based in Los Angeles, California. The group promoted events publicly under the name Uncle Jam's Army (without the second "m"), while its recording credits on electro-funk singles used the spelling Uncle Jamm's Army. Founded by promoter Rodger Clayton, the collective organized large-scale youth dances throughout the Los Angeles area from the late 1970s before dissolving in the late 1980s.

Members of the collective who went on to establish solo careers included Egyptian Lover, Ice-T, DJ Bobcat, DJ Pooh, and Arabian Prince. Writers have identified Uncle Jamm's Army as a formative force connecting Los Angeles funk party culture to professionalized West Coast hip hop, and the group's use of drum machines and electronic instrumentation is cited as an influence on later G-funk producers.

== History ==
Rodger Clayton began throwing amplified backyard and rented-hall parties in the 1970s in Harbor City, Carson, and nearby areas of Los Angeles, building custom sound systems that drew large teen crowds. Gid, Tony, and Greg Martin had been promoting teen dances at Alpine Village in Torrance under Martin Brothers Productions before merging with Clayton in 1978 as Unique Dreams Entertainment. The combined organization later rebranded as Uncle Jam's Army for its live promotions.

The name derived from Parliament-Funkadelic's 1979 album Uncle Jam Wants You. Clayton stated the group wanted to project itself as a "party army".

Early members included Clayton, Gid Martin, Dr. Funkenstein, and Bleebs. Egyptian Lover joined initially as a dancer before becoming one of the group's principal DJs, and DJ Bobcat and other future producers joined during the early 1980s. Arabian Prince (Kim Renard Nazel) contributed electro-based DJ sets with the collective before going on to co-found N.W.A..

By the mid-1980s, Uncle Jam's Army was hosting events at venues including the Hollywood Palladium, the Pasadena Convention Center, and the Los Angeles Sports Arena. KDAY radio DJ Greg Mack played a role in introducing the group's electro-funk sound to broader Los Angeles audiences.

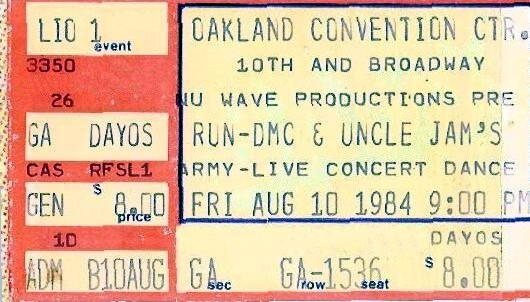
A ticket for a 1984 Run-D.M.C. concert co-headlined by Uncle Jam's Army in Oakland, California

The collective's recordings, credited as Uncle Jamm's Army, were released on Freak Beat Records. These included the 1983 electro single "Dial-A-Freak," followed by "Naughty Boy" and "The Roach Is on the Wall," the latter credited to Uncle Jamm's Army and The California Cat Crew. By the late 1980s, the rise of N.W.A. and Ruthless Records had reshaped the West Coast hip hop landscape, and Uncle Jam's Army ceased operations.

== Impact and legacy ==
Writers identify Uncle Jamm's Army as a bridge between Los Angeles funk party culture and professionalized West Coast hip hop. Their use of drum machines and electronic instrumentation influenced later G-funk producers, including Dr. Dre. The 1983 single "Dial-A-Freak" is recognized as a formative Los Angeles electro release.

== Discography ==
=== Singles ===
- "Dial-A-Freak" (1983, Freak Beat Records, catalog number UJA-1001)
  - A1. "Dial-A-Freak" – 6:35
  - A2. "Yes, Yes, Yes (Vocal)" – 7:25
  - B1. "Yes, Yes, Yes (Instrumental)" – 8:50
- "Naughty Boy" (1985, Freak Beat Records, catalog number UJA-1002)
  - A1. "Naughty Boy"
  - A2. "What's Your Sign (Of the Zodiac Baby Doll)"
  - B1. "What's Your Sign (Instrumental)"
- "The Roach Is on the Wall" (credited to Uncle Jamm's Army & The California Cat Crew) (1985, Freak Beat Records, catalog number UJA-1003)
  - A1. "The Roach Is on the Wall"
  - A2. "Roach Motel (Fast Version)"
  - B1. "The Roach Is on the Wall (Slow Instrumental Rap Yourself)"

== Deaths ==
Rodger Clayton died on October 10, 2010, of a heart attack. David "Dr. Funkenstein" Storm, an original member of the collective, died in 2023 and was publicly memorialized by former colleagues. (Note: The death of David Storm was reported by peers on social media, including a memorial post by Egyptian Lover. No independent news coverage has been located. A more reliable secondary source for this claim would strengthen the article for GA review.)
