= List of years in hip-hop =

This page indexes the individual year in hip hop music pages.

1970s

- 1979 in hip hop music

1980s

- 1980 in hip hop music
- 1981 in hip hop music
- 1982 in hip hop music
- 1983 in hip hop music
- 1984 in hip hop music
- 1985 in hip hop music
- 1986 in hip hop music
- 1987 in hip hop music
- 1988 in hip hop music
- 1989 in hip hop music

1990s

- 1990 in hip hop music
- 1991 in hip hop music
- 1992 in hip hop music
- 1993 in hip hop music
- 1994 in hip hop music
- 1995 in hip hop music
- 1996 in hip hop music
- 1997 in hip hop music
- 1998 in hip hop music
- 1999 in hip hop music

2000s

- 2000 in hip hop music
- 2001 in hip hop music
- 2002 in hip hop music
- 2003 in hip hop music
- 2004 in hip hop music
- 2005 in hip hop music
- 2006 in hip hop music
- 2007 in hip hop music
- 2008 in hip hop music
- 2009 in hip hop music

2010s

- 2010 in hip hop music
- 2011 in hip hop music
- 2012 in hip hop music
- 2013 in hip hop music
- 2014 in hip hop music
- 2015 in hip hop music
- 2016 in hip hop music
- 2017 in hip hop music
- 2018 in hip hop music
- 2019 in hip hop music

2020s

- 2020 in hip hop music
- 2021 in hip hop music
- 2022 in hip hop music
- 2023 in hip hop music
- 2024 in hip hop music
- 2025 in hip hop music
- 2026 in hip hop music
