= 1984 in hip-hop =

This article summarizes the events, album releases, and album release dates in hip hop music for the year 1984. It was a pivotal year for the popularity of hip-hop music and dance in the United States, due to the nationwide release of several films prominently featuring elements of hip-hop culture. These films included Beat Street, Breakin', and Breakin' 2: Electric Boogaloo.

== Released albums ==
Release Date	Artist	Album
January 3	Crash Crew	The Crash Crew
March 1	Duke Bootee	Bust Me Out
March 27	Run-D.M.C.	Run-D.M.C.
April 27	Treacherous Three	The Treacherous Three
May 4	Newcleus	Jam on Revenge
May 29	The Fat Boys	Fat Boys
June 27	The Sugarhill Gang	Livin' in the Fast Lane
August 10	Kurtis Blow	Ego Trip
October 17	Whodini	Escape
November 30	Egyptian Lover	On the Nile
Unknown	Various Artists	Beat Street (soundtrack)
Unknown	T Ski Valley	in the 80's
Unknown	Grandmaster Melle Mel & The Furious Five	Grandmaster Melle Mel and the Furious Five
Unknown	Rock Steady Crew	Ready for Battle
Unknown	Various Artists	Street Sounds Crucial Electro
Unknown	Various Artists	Street Sounds Crucial Electro 2
Unknown	Various Artists	Street Sounds Electro 3
Unknown	Various Artists	Street Sounds Electro 4
Unknown	Various Artists	Street Sounds Electro 5
Unknown	Various Artists	Street Sounds Electro 6
Unknown	Various Artists	Street Sounds UK Electro

== See also ==
- Last article: 1983 in hip hop music
- Next article: 1985 in hip hop music
