= Street Sounds Electro 2 =

Compilation album by various artists
- Released: 1983
- Genre: Electro music, old school hip hop
- Label: StreetSounds

Street Sounds Electro 2 is the second compilation album in a series released 1983 on the StreetSounds label. The album was released on LP and cassette and contains seven electro music and old school hip hop tracks mixed by Herbie Laidley.

In a lit for The Quietus, Steve Mason, formerly of the Beta Band, has ranked it among his thirteen favourite albums, saying: "Electro 2 really sticks with me for two reasons. Firstly it's got one of the most important records on it that I've ever heard in my life – 'Beat Bop' by Rammelzee and K-Rob. For me, when I hear that, it just encapsulates everything that hip-hop is about; that early 1980s Bronx/New York thing. I dunno why it does, but there's just something about it. The avant-garde-ness of it all. It's produced by Jean-Michel Basquiat. It's such an exciting record. It's really fucking weird. There's loads of reverb on the vocal and then that violin comes in. The rap is superb. It's stunning. Plus 'White Lines' is on it."

== Track listing ==
Side one
No.	Title	Artist	Length
1.	"Two, Three, Break"	B Boys	5:01
2.	"Cuttin' Herbie"	The B-Boys	4:36
3.	"On The Upside"	Xena	5:53
4.	"Al-Naafiysh"	Hashim	6:06

Side two
No.	Title	Artist	Length
1.	"Beat Bop"	Rammellzee vs. K-Rob	10:10
2.	"B Boys Beware (Club Mix)"	Two Sisters featuring Emcee Popper G.L.O.B.E	5:50
3.	"White Lines (Don't Don't Do It)"	Grandmaster Flash & Melle Mel	7:33
