= VHB =

VHB may refer to:

- Vanasse Hangen Brustlin, Inc., an American civil engineering firm
- Vereinigte Huttwil-Bahnen, one of three Swiss railways that merged in 1997 to form Regionalverkehr Mittelland
- Verkehrsverbund Hegau-Bodensee, a German transport association
- Verlagsgruppe Handelsblatt, publisher of the German business newspaper Handelsblatt
- Virtual Haptic Back, a haptic technology in medicine
- VHb (hemoglobin), found in the bacterium Vitreoscilla
- VHB monitor, or very high brightness monitor, a type of computer monitor
- VHB, a vehicle registration plate prefix for vehicles for hire in Victoria, Australia
- The VHB, a performer on the 1984 compilation album Street Sounds Electro 4
- VHB tape, a trademarked family of acrylic-adhesive double-sided tapes made by 3M
