= Street Sounds Electro 7 =

Compilation album by various artists
- Released: 1985
- Genre: Electro music, old school hip hop
- Label: StreetSounds

Street Sounds Electro 7 is the seventh compilation album in a series and was released 1985 on the StreetSounds label. The album was released on LP and cassette and contains seven electro music and old school hip hop tracks mixed by Herbie Laidley.

== Track listing ==
Side one
No.	Title	Artist	Length
1.	"Girls (Remix Long Version)"	Egyptian Lover	-:--
2.	"808 Beats (Club Mix)"	The Unknown DJ	-:--
3.	"Fresh Mess (Jam ...Your Radio)"	Knights Of The Turntables	-:--

Side two
No.	Title	Artist	Length
1.	"Queen Of Rox (Shante Rox On) (Street Version)"	Roxanne Shanté	-:--
2.	"Dedication"	The Fearless Four	-:--
3.	"Itchiban Scratch"	Chris "The Glove" Taylor	-:--
4.	"Stick Up Kid"	B Boys	-:--
