= 1985 in hip-hop =

This article summarizes the events, album releases, and album release dates in hip hop music for the year 1985.

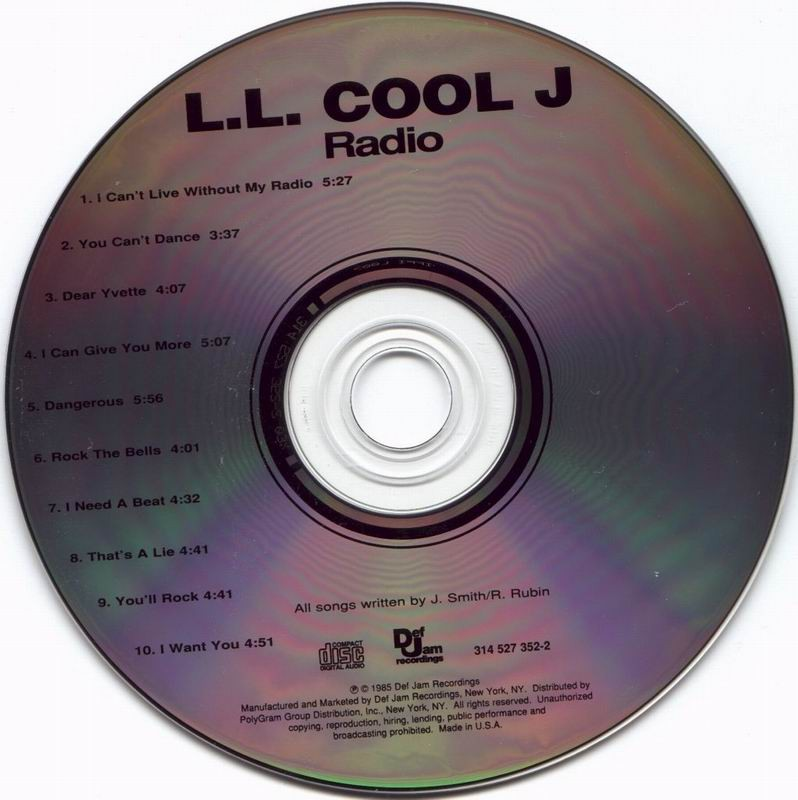
LL Cool J's platinum-selling and critically acclaimed debut album Radio helped launch his hip-hop career.

== Released albums ==
Release Date	Artist	Album
January 1	UTFO	UTFO
January 21	Run-D.M.C.	King of Rock
February 18	Boogie Boys	City Life
April 17	Schoolly D	Schoolly D
April 26	Grandmaster Flash	They Said It Couldn't Be Done
May 4	Mantronix	The Album
May 27	Too Short	Players
June 1	The Fat Boys	The Fat Boys Are Back
August 4	World Class Wrecking Cru	World Class
September 30	Various Artists	Krush Groove (soundtrack)
October	Kurtis Blow	America
November 18	LL Cool J	Radio
November 25	Shawn Brown	¿Que Pasa?
Unknown	Bobby Jimmy and the Critters	Ugly Knuckle Butt
Unknown	Dr. Jeckyll and Mr. Hyde	The Champagne of Rap
Unknown	Jazzy Jeff	On Fire
Unknown	Newcleus	Space is the Place
Unknown	West Coast Crew	In the Mix
Unknown	Various Artists	Mr. Magic's Rap Attack
Unknown	Various Artists	Street Sounds Electro 7
Unknown	Various Artists	Street Sounds Electro 8
Unknown	Various Artists	Street Sounds Electro 9
Unknown	Various Artists	Street Sounds Electro 10

== See also ==
- Last article: 1984 in hip hop music
- Next article: 1986 in hip hop music
