= Street Sounds Electro 3 =

Compilation album by various artists
- Released: 1984
- Genre: Electro music, old school hip hop
- Label: StreetSounds

Street Sounds Electro 3 is the third compilation album in a series and was released 1984 on the StreetSounds label. The album was released on LP and cassette and contains seven electro music and old school hip hop tracks mixed by Herbie Laidley.

== Track listing ==
Side one
No.	Title	Artist	Length
1.	"Dollar Bill"	Divine Sounds	-:--
2.	"We Come To Rock"	Imperial Brothers	-:--
3.	"Jam On It"	Newcleus	-:--

Side two
No.	Title	Artist	Length
1.	"Zodiac"	Boogie Boys	-:--
2.	"King Of The Beat"	Pumpkin	-:--
3.	"One For The Treble (Fresh)"	Davy DMX	-:--
4.	"Fresh"	Fresh 3 MCs	-:--
