= Street Sounds Electro 9 =

Compilation album by various artists
- Released: 1985
- Genre: Electro music, old school hip hop
- Label: StreetSounds

Street Sounds Electro 9 is the ninth compilation album in a series and was released 1985 on the StreetSounds label. The album was released on LP and cassette and contains eight electro music and old school hip hop tracks mixed by Herbie Laidley.

== Track listing ==
Side one
No.	Title	Artist	Length
1.	"The Show"	Doug E. Fresh & The Get Fresh Crew	-:--
2.	"Bad Boys"	Bad Boys	-:--
3.	"The Home Of Hip Hop"	D.ST	-:--
4.	"Terminator"	Kid Frost	-:--

Side two
No.	Title	Artist	Length
1.	"World Class"	The World Class Wreckin' Cru	-:--
2.	"Needle To The Groove"	Mantronik	-:--
3.	"The Fat Boys Are Back"	Fat Boys	-:--
4.	"The Roof Is On Fire"	Rock Master Scott & The Dynamic Three	-:--
