= Street Sounds Crucial Electro 2 =

Compilation album by various artists
- Released: 1984
- Genre: Electro music, old school hip hop
- Length: 44:35
- Label: StreetSounds

Street Sounds Crucial Electro 2 is the second compilation album in a series and was released 1984 on the StreetSounds label. The album was released on LP and cassette and contains eight electro music and old school hip hop tracks mixed by D.J. Maurice Watson assisted by D.J. Noel Watson/Bunny Rock Inc.

== Track listing ==
Side one
| No. | Title | Artist | Length |
|---|---|---|---|
| 1. | "Two, Three Break" | B Boys | 5:30 |
| 2. | "The Party Scene (Sv)" | The Russell Brothers | 5:33 |
| 3. | "One For The Treble (Fresh)" | Davy DMX | 7:16 |
| 4. | "I'm A Pac Man" | Pac Man | 5:32 |

Side two
| No. | Title | Artist | Length |
|---|---|---|---|
| 1. | "Let The Music Play (Dub)" | Shannon | 5:28 |
| 2. | "On The Upside" | Xena | 4:06 |
| 3. | "Planet Rock" | Afrika Bambaataa & The Soul Sonic Force | 5:26 |
| 4. | "Pac Jam (Looking Out For The OVC)" | Jonzun Crew | 5:41 |
