= Privacy-enhanced computer display =

Technology by Mitsubitshi Electric Research Laboratories

Developed by Mitsubitshi Electric Research Laboratories, a privacy-enhanced computer display allows information that must remain private to be viewed on computer displays located in public areas (i.e. banks, hospitals and pharmacies) by employing the use of both ferroelectric shutter glasses and a unique device driver.

== History ==
Prior to the invention of the privacy-enhanced computer display, several static systems that serve a similar purpose had already been established. These function as tools that protect the public computer display without any dynamic alterations to the video stream itself. For instance, a security screen that prevents any users who are not on the right angle to see the display is a static system. Another example of the static system is the front polarizer of the LCD screen. Such a polarizer may be removed when the computer display is in secure use, or authorized users must otherwise wear a polarized sunglasses to see the screen.

== Technology ==
For each pixel at location $i,j$, privacy-enhanced computer display technology utilizes a public display image $P_{ij}$, a secret display image $S_{ij}$, a proprietary device driver, a CRT capable of rapid refresh rates (up to 120Hz) and a set of synchronized ferroelectric shutter glasses. The device driver causes the computer monitor to alternately display the pixelwise difference $P_{ij}-S_{ij}$ and the unaltered secret image $S_{ij}$. When viewed directly without the shutter glasses, the human eye's persistence of vision blurs the two images into:

$\frac{P_{ij} - S_{ij} + S_{ij}}{2} = \frac{P_{ij}}{2}.$

This results in the public image, effectively preventing an unintended recipient from viewing the secret image. The intended recipient, wearing the synchronized glasses, will see only the secret image $S_{ij}$.

== Advantages ==
The major advantage of the shutter glass system was that it allowed the same display to be used for multiple unrelated images, one of which was visible without any glasses at all. Unfortunately, the contrast ratio of the public image is only half the available contrast ratio of the CRT when driven with only a public image.

== Disadvantages ==
A secondary issue was that although the image was privacy-enhanced, it was not secure. The secret image appeared as a "ghost" if one moved one's head rapidly - or struck the viewer's head with a soft object, thereby offsetting the two image fields and revealing the edges of the difference image.

With the rapid growth of handheld phones with integrated digital cameras (and fast shutters) the phone's camera video will often reveal alternating frames of the public and secret images. This effectively breaks the privacy capability of the system.

A final issue is the decline of the CRT and the rise of the LCD in display technology, because nearly all LCDs are too slow to support the 120Hz or faster refresh rate needed for this privacy enhancement to work. Meanwhile, lenticular monitor filters have diminished the need for the shutterglass technology.

== Possible applications ==
- Banks (bank balance information)
- Hospitals (patient health information)
- Pharmacies (prescription drug information)
- Airline ticketing and airport gate agent stations (passenger and security information)

== Sales ==
The patent was sold in 2010 to Intellectual Ventures, who obtained a reissue in 2012 (US patent RE43,362) with additional claims.

== See also ==
- High brightness monitor
