= Street Sounds Crucial Electro =

Compilation album by various artists
- Released: 1984
- Genre: Electro music, old school hip hop
- Length: 42:20
- Label: StreetSounds

Street Sounds Crucial Electro is the first compilation album in a series and was released in 1984 on the StreetSounds label. The album was released on LP and cassette and contains ten electro music and old school hip hop tracks mixed by Herbie Laidley.

== Track listing ==
Side one
No.	Title	Artist	Length
1.	"The Smurf"	Tyrone Brunson	4:15
2.	"Light Years Away"	Warp 9	3:27
3.	"Nunk (New Wave Funk)"	Warp 9	3:37
4.	"Hip Hop, Be Bop (Don't Stop)"	Man Parrish	4:37
5.	"Rockit"	Herbie Hancock	4:47

Side two
No.	Title	Artist	Length
1.	"Electric Kingdom"	Twilight 22	6:00
2.	"Clear"	Cybotron	4:13
3.	"Al-Naafiysh (The Soul)"	Hashim	3:12
4.	"Return Of Captain Rock"	Captain Rock	3:45
5.	"Wildstyle"	Time Zone	4:21
