= 1983 in hip-hop =

This article summarizes the events, album releases, and album release dates in hip hop music for the year 1983.

== Film releases ==
In 1983, Style Wars by New Day Films, focusing on the graffiti movement within hip hop culture, was broadcast on PBS.

== Released albums ==
Release Date	Artist	Album
April 26	Jonzun Crew	Lost in Space
May 27	Malcolm McLaren	Duck Rock
October 13	Whodini	Whodini
October 24	Too Short	Don't Stop Rappin'
December 10	The World's Famous Supreme Team with Malcolm McLaren	D'ya Like Scratchin' (EP)
Unknown	Kurtis Blow	Party Time?
Unknown	The Sugarhill Gang	Rappin' Down Town
Unknown	Warp 9	It's a Beat Wave
Unknown	The Sequence	The Sequence Party
Unknown	Wild Style	Wild Style Original Soundtrack
Unknown	Afrika Bambaataa	Death Mix
Unknown	Beastie Boys	Cooky Puss
Unknown	Cybotron	Enter
Unknown	Various Artists	Street Sounds Electro 1
Unknown	Various Artists	Street Sounds Electro 2

== See also ==
- Last article: 1982 in hip hop music
- Next article: 1984 in hip hop music
