= War (Mastermind song) =

2020 song by Mastermind

Single by Mastermind
- Released: March 19, 2020
- Producer: LiTek

Mastermind singles chronology
"Nunu" (2019)	"War" (2020)	"Losses" (2020)

"War" is a song by Mastermind featuring Bandokay. It was released as a single in 2020 and peaked at number 39 on the UK Singles Chart.

Jack Lynch, writing for Complex Networks about the song, wrote:

...on Litek's eerie trap instrumental, we hear Bandokay switch lanes comfortably, proving he is more than just a leading drill artist. The pair of young rhymers blend their styles seamlessly throughout, with an up-tempo and catchy hook being delivered in classic Mastermind fashion, and the end result is pure UK rap gold.

== Charts ==
Chart (2020)	Peak position
UK Singles (OCC)	39
