= Street Sounds Electro 8 =

Compilation album by various artists
- Released: 1985
- Genre: Electro music, old school hip hop
- Label: StreetSounds

Street Sounds Electro 8 is the eighth compilation album in a series and was released 1985 on the StreetSounds label. The album was released on LP and cassette and contains eight electro music and old school hip hop tracks mixed by Herbie Laidley.

== Track listing ==
Side one
No.	Title	Artist	Length
1.	"The Battle"	Sparky Dee vs. The Playgirls	-:--
2.	"The DMX Will Rock (Rap Mix)"	Davy DMX	-:--
3.	"Confusion"	Aleem	-:--
4.	"D.E.F Momentum"	D.E.F	-:--

Side two
No.	Title	Artist	Length
1.	"Marley Marl Scratch"	Marley Marl featuring M.C. Shan	-:--
2.	"Girls"	B Boys	-:--
3.	"Wrong Girls To Play With (Dub)"	Papa Austen With The Great Peso	-:--
4.	"D.J Cuttin"	N.Y.C Cutter	-:--
