= INAS 335 =

- Active: 17 December 2025—present
- Country: India
- Allegiance: India
- Branch: Indian Navy
- Type: Multirole Helicopter squadron
- Size: 6
- Garrison/HQ: INS Hansa, Goa
- Nickname: Ospreys

Aircraft flown
- Multirole helicopter: Sikorsky MH-60R

The INAS 335 (Ospreys) is a helicopter squadron of the Indian Navy operating Sikorsky MH-60R Sea Hawk helicopters since 17 December 2025. The squadron is based at INS Hansa in Goa.

The primary roles of the squadron includes anti-submarine warfare (ASW), anti-surface warfare (ASuW), search and rescue (SAR), medical evacuation (MEDEVAC) and vertical replenishment (VERTREP).

The squadron was commissioned on 17 December 2025 by the Chief of the Naval Staff, Admiral Dinesh Kumar Tripathi, at INS Hansa.

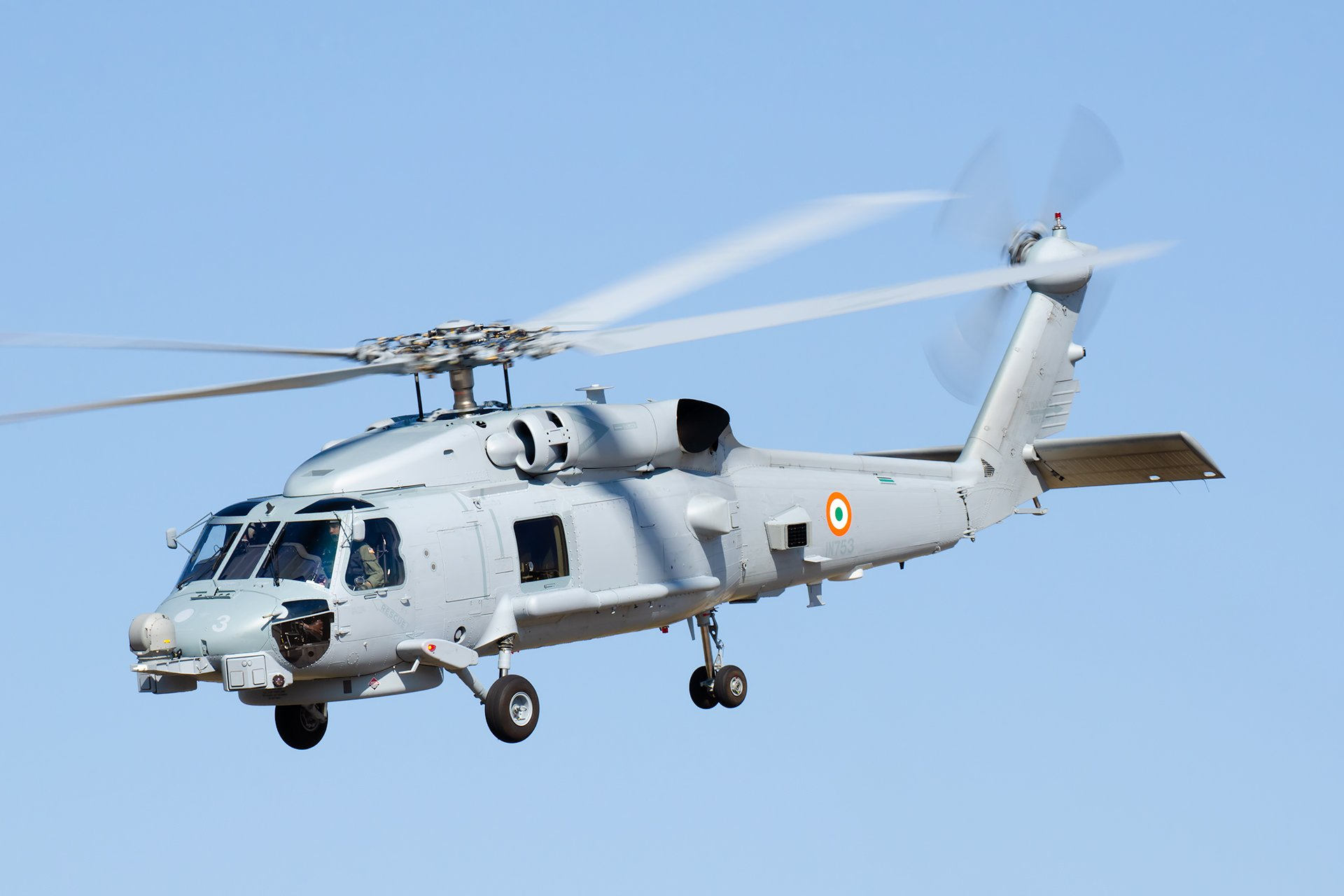
Indian Navy MH-60 Helicopter
