= Street Sounds Electro 5 =

Compilation album by various artists
- Released: 1984
- Genre: Electro music, old school hip hop
- Label: StreetSounds

Street Sounds Electro 5 is the fifth compilation album in a series and was released 1984 on the StreetSounds label. The album was released on LP and cassette and contains nine electro music and old school hip hop tracks mixed by Bunny Rock Inc. featuring DJ Maurice and DJ Noel Watson (The Watson Brothers).

== Track listing ==
Side one
No.	Title	Artist	Length
1.	"It's Time To Rock"	Great Peso & Mr. Nasty	-:--
2.	"Fast Life"	Dr. Jeckyll & Mr. Hyde	-:--
3.	"Techno Scratch"	Knights Of The Turntables	-:--
4.	"Egypt Egypt"	Egyptian Lover	-:--
5.	"Breakers Revenge"	Arthur Baker	-:--

Side two
No.	Title	Artist	Length
1.	"Capt. Rock to The Future Shock"	Captain Rock	-:--
2.	"Release Yourself"	Aleem	-:--
3.	"The Buck Stops Here"	Fantasy Three	-:--
4.	"B Boys Breakdance"	High Fidelity Three	-:--
