= Street Sounds Electro 4 =

Compilation album by various artists
- Released: 1984
- Genre: Electro music, old school hip hop
- Label: StreetSounds

Street Sounds Electro 4 is the fourth compilation album in a series released in 1984 on the StreetSounds label. The album was released on LP and cassette and contains seven electro music and old school hip hop tracks mixed by DJ's Maurice and Noel Watson/Bunny Rock.

== Track listing ==
Side one
| No. | Title | Artist | Length |
|---|---|---|---|
| 1. | "Steps Ahead" | Radio Active | 6:45 |
| 2. | "Here Comes That Beat!" | Pumpkin & The Profile All-Stars | 6:50 |
| 3. | "Megamix (Includes: Rockit, Autodrive, Future Shock, TFS, Rough & Chameleon '84)" | Herbie Hancock | 6:18 |

Side two
| No. | Title | Artist | Length |
|---|---|---|---|
| 1. | "Sucker M.C.'s" | Run-D.M.C | 3:15 |
| 2. | "Breakin' In Space" | Key-Matic | 6:16 |
| 3. | "Beethoven's Fifth (Street) Symphony" | The VHB | 7:03 |
| 4. | "Techno City" | Cybotron | 6:55 |
