= Street Sounds UK Electro =

Compilation album by various artists
- Released: 1984
- Genre: Electro, old school hip hop
- Label: StreetSounds

Street Sounds UK Electro is the one and only release of UK based artists from the StreetSounds label. The album was released on LP and cassette in 1984 and contains seven electro and old school hip hop tracks mixed by DJ Mastermind. Although each track has individual producer and artist credits, everything except B2 is actually the work of Manchester electro-funk DJ Greg Wilson and associates (including Kermit, who would later go on to join Ruthless Rap Assassins and Black Grape).

In 2013, Fact magazine ranked the album at number 61 in its list of "The 100 Best Albums of the 1980s", saying: "The decade had no shortage of scene-making compilations – C86, the Wild Style OST and Deep Six spring to mind – but, on British soil at least, few had quite as profound and enduring an influence as the electrospectives put out by Morgan Khan’s Streetsounds label, a.k.a. the Windrush that brought electro to the UK. Earlier instalments introduced embryo-stage hip-hop to an enthusiastic UK public, but this charming homegrown simulacrum stands out as the quirkiest episode in a hugely important series. Zer-O, Syncbeat, Foreveraction – wherever (and whoever) you are, you are saluted."

== Track listing ==
Side one
No.	Title	Artist	Length
1.	"Real Time (Retrospective Dub)"	Zer-O	-:--
2.	"Music"	Syncbeat	-:--
3.	"Style of the street"	Broken Glass	-:--
4.	"U People"	Forevereaction	-:--

Side two
No.	Title	Artist	Length
1.	"Real time"	Zer-O	-:--
2.	"Hip Hop Beat (Street Mix)"	Rapologists	-:--
3.	"B.E.D. '34"	Forevereaction	-:--
