= Street Sounds Electro 1 =

Compilation album by various artists
- Released: 1983
- Genre: Electro, old school hip hop
- Label: StreetSounds

Street Sounds Electro 1 is the first compilation album in a series released 1983 on the StreetSounds label. The album was released on LP and cassette and contains eight electro and old school hip hop tracks mixed by Herbie Laidley.

== Track listing ==
Side one
No.	Title	Artist	Length
1.	"I'm The Packman (Eat Everything I Can)"	The Packman	6:35
2.	"Jam on Revenge (The Wikki-Wikki Song)"	Newcleus	7:49
3.	"Break Dancin' — Electric Boogie"	West Street Mob	5:02
4.	"Get Wet"	C-Bank	7:52

Side two
No.	Title	Artist	Length
1.	"Dog Talk"	K-9 Corp. featuring Pretty C	9:35
2.	"Feel the Force"	G-Force featuring Ronnie Gee & Captain Cee	7:24
3.	"Ray-Gun-Omics"	Project Future	6:40
4.	"The Return of Capt. Rock"	Captain Rock	8:23
