= Street Sounds Electro 6 =

Compilation album by various artists
- Released: 1984
- Genre: Electro music, old school hip hop
- Label: StreetSounds

Street Sounds Electro 6 is the sixth compilation album in a series and was released 1984 on the StreetSounds label. The album was released on LP and cassette and contains nine electro music and old school hip hop tracks mixed by DJ Maurice Watson assisted by DJ Noel Watson (The Watson Brothers/Bunny Rock).

== Track listing ==
Side one
No.	Title	Artist	Length
1.	"Roxanne, Roxanne"	UTFO	-:--
2.	"The Real Roxanne"	The Real Roxanne (With UTFO)	-:--
3.	"Cosmic Blast"	Capt. Rock	-:--
4.	"Roxanne's Revenge"	Roxanne Shanté	-:--
5.	"Freaks Come Out At Night"	Whodini	-:--

Side two
No.	Title	Artist	Length
1.	"My House (On The Nile)"	Egyptian Lover	-:--
2.	"Beat Freak"	Bobby Broom	-:--
3.	"Just Having Fun (Do The Beat Box)"	Doug E. Fresh	-:--
4.	"The Original Human Beat Box"	Doug E. Fresh	-:--
