= 1979 in hip-hop =

This article summarizes the events, album releases, and album release dates in hip-hop for the year 1979.

== Releases ==
=== March ===
==== Fatback Band – King Tim III (Personality Jock) ====
On March 25, 1979, the Fatback Band released the single "King Tim III (Personality Jock)" which is often cited as the first recorded hip hop song. However, a song called "Enterprise" was released on July 7, 1978, as part of the record album from the Broadway musical play Runaways (Original Broadway Cast Recording). is also considered as the first recorded hip hop song. However, the exact origins of hip hop remain debated, with various recordings and performances from the 1970s contributing to its early development. Regardless of the specific milestone, these early releases laid the foundation for the vibrant and influential genre that hip hop would become.

=== September ===
==== The Sugarhill Gang – Rapper's Delight ====
On September 16, 1979, The Sugarhill Gang released the single Rapper's Delight, which became the first commercially successful hip-hop song. It was the first rap song to appear on the Billboard Hot 100, reaching number 37, and peaked at number 4 on the R&B charts. It is often mistaken as the first recorded hip hop song. The song was increasingly popular outside of the United States especially in the United Kingdom and Canada-it exceeded over $3.5 million in sales and over two million in copies within the first few weeks of its launching. In 2011, the song was preserved into the National Recording Registry by the Library of Congress stat, especially in the United Kingdom and Canada. It exceeded over $3.5 million in sales and over two million in copies within the first few weeks of its launching, the infectious dance number might have launched an entire genre. In 2014, "Rapper's Delight" was inducted into the Grammy Hall of Fame. Over 14 million copies of "Rapper's Delight" have been sold since 1979.

=== December ===
==== Kurtis Blow – Christmas Rappin' ====
Russell Simmons decided that he wanted to create a rap record with Kurtis Blow. He realized that the best way of earning money was by creating a Christmas record as it would be played every year. After playing the song for 22 labels, they finally got it released on Mercury Records. The record was eventually sold over 500,000 times. There were obstacles in their way as they tried to make "Christmas Rappin'" widely available. Even with the song's obvious popularity, record labels refused to support Simmons and Blow because they doubted rap music could succeed, particularly when it comes to Christmas music. They continued anyhow, playing the song for a number of labels before they eventually signed a record deal with Mercury Records.

Kurtis Blows "Christmas Rappin'" gave hip-hop an exciting sound by mixing rap with the happy feelings of Christmas. The song sold than 500,000 copies. This showed that hip-hop could connect with people who were not usually, into the genre. Russell Simmons saw the chance to bring rap into holiday music. He worked with Kurtis Blow to make the idea happen.

=== Unknown month ===
Bramsam – Move Your Body

Dr. Superman / Lady Sweet – Can You Do It (Superman) / Back to Metropolis

David Lampell – I Ran Iran

Eddie Cheba – Lookin' Good (Shake Your Body)

Family – Family Rap

First Class – Rappin' It Up

Funky Constellation – Street Talk (Madam Rapper)

Funky Four Plus One – Rappin' and Rocking the House

Grandmaster Flash and The Furious Five – SuperRappin'

Jocko – Rhythm Talk

Jocko – The Rocketship

Jazzy 4 MC's – MC Rock

Joe Bataan – Rap-O Clap-O / El Rap-O Clap-O

Lady B – To The Beat Y'all

Lady D / MC Tee – Lady D / Nu Sounds

Little Starsky – Gangster Rock

Mr. Q – D. J. Style

Mr. Q – Ladies Delight

Mr. Q – Love & Time / Rapping Time

Mr. Q – Party Party / Party Rapp

Neil B / Brooklyn Express – Body Rock

The Sequence – Funk You Up

Ron Hunt / Ronnie G. & The S.M. Crew – Spiderap / A Corona Jam

Paulett and Tanya Winley / Ann Winley – Rhymin' and Rappin' / Watch Dog

Scoopy – Scoopy Rap

Sicle Cell & Rhapazooty – Rhapazooty in Blue

Spoonie Gee – Spoonin Rap

Steve Gordon & The Kosher Five – Take My Rap... Please

T.J. Swan – And You Know That

Troy Rainey – Tricky Tee Rap

Uno – Boogie Beat

Wackie's Disco Rock Band – Wack Rap

Willie Wood & Willie Wood Crew – Willie Rap

Mr. Magic – Rappin' With Mr. Magic

Xanadu & Sweet Lady – Rappers Delight / Rockers Choice

Younger Generation (early name of Grandmaster Flash and The Furious Five) – We Rap More Mellow

== See also ==
- Next article: 1980 in hip hop music
