= Eddie Cheeba =

American rapper (1956–2024)

- Born: October 18, 1956
- Died: February 13, 2024 (aged 67)
- Genres: Hip hop
- Occupation: DJ

Eddie Cheeba (October 18, 1956 – February 13, 2024) was an American DJ in New York in the 1970s, considered to be the number one club DJ. Eddie, real name Edward Sturgis, was born in New York and grew up in the Douglas Projects of the Bronx where he attended Brandeis High School.

Cheeba was a close friend of DJ Hollywood and they frequently influenced each other's styles.

Cheeba is credited with inspiring Def Jam Recordings founder, Russell Simmons to pursue a career in hip-hop when Simmons heard Cheeba perform in Harlem in 1977.

Kurtis Blow took his name imitating Cheeba at the suggestion of Russell Simmons, copying the pattern from Eddie Cheeba as "blow" was a force of power as "cheeba" was slang for marijuana.

Cheeba died on February 13, 2024, at the age of 67.
