= 1982 in hip-hop =

This article summarizes the events, album releases, and album release dates in hip hop music for the year 1982.

== Released albums ==
Release Date	Artist	Album
October 3	Grandmaster Flash and the Furious Five	The Message
October 9	Kurtis Blow	Tough
Unknown	The Sequence	The Sequence

== See also ==
- Last article: 1981 in hip hop music
- Next article: 1983 in hip hop music
