= 1980 in hip-hop =

This article summarizes the events, album releases, and album release dates in hip-hop for the year 1980.

== Released albums ==
| Release Date | Artist | Album |
|---|---|---|
| February 7 | The Sugarhill Gang | Sugarhill Gang |
| September 29 | Kurtis Blow | Kurtis Blow |
| Unknown | The Sequence | Sugarhill Presents The Sequence |

== See also ==
- Last article: 1979 in hip hop music
- Next article: 1981 in hip hop music
