= 1981 in hip-hop =

This article summarizes the events, album releases, and album release dates in hip hop music for the year 1981.

== Released singles ==
- Grandmaster Flash releases "The Adventures of Grandmaster Flash on the Wheels of Steel" with Sugar Hill Records

== Released albums ==
Release Date	Artist	Album
June 15	Kurtis Blow	Deuce
June 25	The Sugarhill Gang	8th Wonder

== See also ==
- Last article: 1980 in hip hop music
- Next article: 1982 in hip hop music
