= Pumpkin (musician) =

American musician (1961–1990)

Errol Eduardo Bedward (January 21, 1961 – August 24, 1990), better known by his stage name Pumpkin, was an American musician, percussionist, and band leader. He was renowned for being the one behind many old school hip hop tracks for the Profile, Enjoy, and Tuff City record companies.

He worked with several influential early hip-hop acts from 1979 to 1984, such as Grandmaster Flash and the Furious Five Spoonie Gee, Treacherous Three, Funky Four, Grandmaster Caz, the Fearless Four, and Dr. Jeckyll & Mr. Hyde, and several more obscure names. His 1983 single "King of the Beat" was followed by one of his last productions, Pumpkin and the Profile All-Stars' "Here Comes the Beat" (Profile, 1984).

A collection of his work for Tuff City was released under his stage name in 1995 as The Tuff City Sessions on its retrospective label Old School Flava.

== Discography ==
=== Albums ===
- The Tuff City Sessions (1995), Old Skool Flava/Tuff City
- Old School's Funkiest Drummer (1995), Tuff City

=== As a band-member/session musician ===
- "Rappin & Rockin The House" - Funky Four Plus One More (Enjoy)
- "Love Rap" - Spoonie Gee - (Enjoy)
- "Body Rock" - Treacherous Three (Enjoy)
- "At the Party" - Treacherous Three (Enjoy)
- "Feel the Heart Beat" - Treacherous Three (Enjoy)
- "Move to the Groove" - Disco Four (Enjoy)
- "Country Rock & Rap" - Disco Four (Enjoy)
- "Put The Boogie In Your Body" - Treacherous Three (Enjoy)
- "The Ultimate Rap" - Nice-N-Nasty Three (Holiday)
- "Ice Theme" - Dr. Ice (Enjoy)
- "Gonna Get You Hot" - The Master Don Committee (Enjoy)
- "Your Rock" - Fantasy Three (Specific)
- "Biters in the City" - Fantasy Three (C.C.L.)
- "Dollar Bill, Y'all" - Jimmy Spice (unknown)
- "Problems of the World Today" - Fearless Four (Elektra)
- "It's Magic" - Fearless Four (Enjoy)
- "Rockin It, Rockin It" - Fearless Four (Enjoy)
- "Gettin Money" - Dr. Jeckyl & Mr. Hyde (Profile)
- "School Beats" - Disco Four (Profile)
- "King of the Beats" - Pumpkin (Profile)
- "Here Comes That Beat" - Pumpkin & the All-Stars (Profile)
- "Funk Boxx 2" - The Master Don Committee (Profile)
- "Mr. Bill" - Grand Master Caz (Tuff City)
- "Joe Blow" - Puffy Dee (Tuff City)
- "Put That Head Out" - Funkmaster Wizard Wiz (Tuff City)
