= B Boys (band) =

- Origin: United Kingdom
- Genres: Pop
- Label: Streetwave

The B Boys were a British male vocal/instrumental pop group. Their album, Cuttin' Herbie, was released on the Streetwave label. It entered the UK Albums Chart on 28 January 1984, and reached #90; it was in the chart for one week.
