= High brightness monitor =

Computer monitor with a high brightness

A high brightness monitor, also known as a sunlight readable monitor or VHB (very high brightness) monitor, is a computer monitor designed to operate in very bright environments, for example in broad daylight. Sunlight readable monitors typically provide at least 800 nits of brightness, versus 200–300 nits brightness for a typical desktop computer monitor. Sunlight readable monitors may also be optically bonded. This process adds a protective outer glass, then fills the air gap between the glass and the LCD panel with an optical-grade resin to eliminate internal reflections and condensation. This also strengthens the outer glass and improves image contrast.

High brightness sunlight readable monitors are typically used commercially in kiosks, vending systems, pipeline inspection systems, outdoor digital signage and advertising, in sports stadiums, in military vehicles, on ships for navigation systems, on bus and train platforms, and much more.
