= Mastermind Herbie =

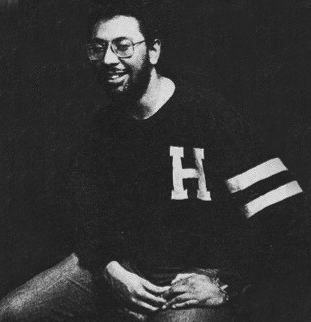
Mastermind Herbie

Herbie Laidley, better known as Mastermind Herbie, is a British DJ and record producer who has worked under a variety of pseudonyms, including The Rapologists and Mastermind. He was also a founder of Mastermind Roadshow - a sound system also featuring Kiss FM DJ's Dave VJ and Max LX and others which formed in Harlesden. He is most famous for mixing the Street Sounds collections of early electro, as well as for a variety of remixes over the years.

In 1983, Herbie was mixing the seminal Street Sounds Electro 1 (Street Sounds, 1983), for label owner Morgan Khan. It was one of the first releases to bring this new style of music to British ears, and spawned a successful series - ten volumes were released by the time of the final volume Street Sounds 10 (Street Sounds, 1985) - and several similarly styled associated collections (Street Sounds Hip Hop Electro, Street Sounds Hip Hop, Street Sounds Crucial Electro). Khan was brought a track produced by Greg Wilson, "Style of the Street" by Broken Glass, which Khan appreciated so much he decided to put out an album called Street Sounds UK Electro (Street Sounds, 1984). In order to create the impression of a thriving UK electro scene, Khan asked Greg and his group to come up with six tracks under a variety of pseudonyms for the album, whilst Herbie also created a track for the album - "Hip Hop Beat (Street Mix)", under the pseudonym of The Rapologists. The album reached number 60 on the UK charts, and Herbie's tune was also released as a single - "Hip Hop Beat" (Billy Boy Records, 1984) - featuring scratches from Whiz Kid.

Herbie went on to produce a remix of "White Lines" for Grandmaster Flash and the Furious Five which was released as a single and on the album Grandmaster Flash and the Furious Five (Sugar Hill Records, 1984), as well as remixes/production for artists including Loose Ends, Harlequin 4, Numarx, DJ Jazzy Jeff and the Fresh Prince, Cookie Crew and Neneh Cherry. Following his co-production of the Neneh Cherry single "Buddy X" (Circa Records, 1993), Herbie resides in London.
