= StreetSounds =

British compilation record label

- Founded: 1982
- Founder: Morgan Khan
- Genre: Various
- Country of origin: United Kingdom
- Official website: Streetsounds.co.uk

StreetSounds is a British compilation record label, that specialised in urban and electronic club/dance music during the mid-1980s. StreetSounds was an offshoot of producer and promoter Morgan Khan's StreetWave label. The first StreetSounds release was the first edition of the label's core compilation series, StreetSounds 1 in late 1982. This regular compilation series proclaimed itself 'one hour packs of the latest dance tracks'. They were composed of full-length versions of (mainly) black club and urban dance music. Some tracks were licensed from the US.

== History ==
The Street Sounds formula for compilations was quality track selection, and reacting quickly to trends with a frenetic release rate.

The run of the Street Sounds series coincided with, and helped promote, the rise of electronic dance music during the mid-1980s, at a time when style conscious young adults in the UK were looking for an alternative to rock, pop and post-punk music.

Khan later extended the formula and released other compilation series including jazz-funk, house and high energy genres.

Notable Street Sounds releases included the Philadelphia Story; SOLAR; Love Ballads; and Dance Decade box sets. The Artists compilations, that collected representative tracks from specific artists, and 'Anthems' series (compilations of dance music classics) were also well-regarded. The Japanese instrumental group A.B.'s album Deja Vu was released on the label, in 1983. The Street Sounds logo was changed several times over the lifespan of the label.

The Street Sounds label went into liquidation in 1988, mainly as a result of large losses incurred by Street Scene, Khan's club music magazine.

After its collapse, the Street Sounds label was dormant for some years. It has since been revived by Khan, and offers mainly reissues of back-catalogue material from the original Street Sounds incarnation.

In April 2009, Street Sounds released a new Electro compilation through the Street Sounds website. Nu Electro Volume 1 featured twenty tracks mixed by Freddy Fresh and Diplomat, and the musical style returned to the electronic roots of the series rather than the hip hop style compilation that was released in 1988 as Electro 22.

In 2015, Street Sounds released volume 4 of the Crucial Electro series on CD and vinyl formats.

Creative Director John Carver was responsible for StreetSounds' branding. Carver suggested the name StreetSounds as an alternative to StreetBeat. He handled the branding, packaging and advertising for StreetSounds for the first few years and was responsible for devising iconic terms like "Electro is aural sex" for the Electro series and "Get set for sweat" for the Hi-NRG series.
