= 1990 in hip-hop =

This article summarizes the events, album releases, and album release dates in hip-hop for the year 1990.

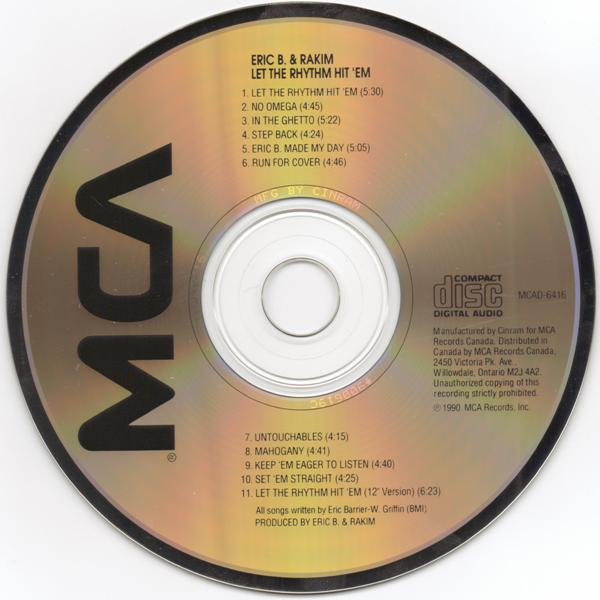
Eric B. & Rakim's Let the Rhythm Hit 'Em earned praise within hip-hop circles and marked the group's third consecutive gold album.

== Released albums ==
Release Date	Artist	Album
February 6	Lord Finesse & DJ Mike Smooth	Funky Technician
February 6	Mantronix	This Should Move Ya
February 12	Bobby Jimmy and the Critters	Hip-Hop Prankster
February 12	MC Hammer	Please Hammer, Don't Hurt 'Em
February 20	Above The Law	Livin' Like Hustlers
February 20	Doug Lazy	Doug Lazy Gettin' Crazy
February 22	Rodney-O & Joe Cooley	Three the Hard Way
March 9	Various Artists	House Party (soundtrack)
March 13	Kid 'n Play	Funhouse
March 19	Salt-n-Pepa	Blacks' Magic
March 20	Digital Underground	Sex Packets
March 20	Mark Dee	All In A Day's Work
March 27	Everlast	Forever Everlasting
March 28	The Dogs	The Dogs
April 1	Three Times Dope	Live from Acknickulous Land
April 3	Various Artists	Teenage Mutant Ninja Turtles: The Original Motion Picture Soundtrack
April 10	A Tribe Called Quest	People's Instinctive Travels and the Paths of Rhythm
April 10	Boo-Yaa T.R.I.B.E.	New Funky Nation
April 10	Public Enemy	Fear of a Black Planet
April 10	YZ	Sons of the Father
April 11	MC Shan	Play It Again, Shan
April 17	Audio Two	I Don't Care: The Album
April 24	X Clan	To the East, Blackwards
May 1	Kwamé	A Day in the Life: A Pokadelick Adventure
May 18	Ice Cube	AmeriKKKa's Most Wanted
May 22	K-Solo	Tell the World My Name
May 29	Poor Righteous Teachers	Holy Intellect
May 30	Antoinette	Burnin' at 20 Below
June 12	MC Trouble	Gotta Get a Grip
June 15	King Sun	Righteous but Ruthless
June 19	Compton's Most Wanted	It's a Compton Thang
June 19	Eric B. & Rakim	Let the Rhythm Hit 'Em
June 28	Kyper	Tic-Tac-Toe
July 2	Kid Sensation	Rollin' with Number One
July 3	Whodini	Greatest Hits
July 10	Kid Frost	Hispanic Causing Panic
July 10	Tragedy Khadafi	Intelligent Hoodlum
July 11	Choice	The Big Payback
July 13	Luke	The Luke LP
July 16	The Jaz	To Your Soul
July 17	Boogie Down Productions	Edutainment
July 24	D-Nice	Call Me D-Nice
July 24	Masta Ace	Take a Look Around
July 31	Special Ed	Legal
August 1	DJ Kool	The Music Ain't Loud Enuff
August 7	CPO	To Hell and Black
August 13	Various Artists	The Return of Superfly (soundtrack)
August 14	Kool G Rap & DJ Polo	Wanted: Dead or Alive
August 14	N.W.A	100 Miles and Runnin' (EP)
August 14	The Afros	Kickin' Afrolistics
August 20	Poison Clan	2 Low Life Muthas
August 30	Cool C	Life in the Ghetto
September 10	Vanilla Ice	To the Extreme
September 11	Too Short	Short Dog's in the House
September 14	LL Cool J	Mama Said Knock You Out
September 14	Isis	Rebel Soul
September 21	Geto Boys	The Geto Boys
September 22	2 Live Crew	Live in Concert
September 24	King T	At Your Own Risk
September 27	Various Artists	Marked for Death (soundtrack)
October 1	Kings Of Swing	Strategy
October 2	Candyman	Ain't No Shame in My Game
October 2	H.W.A.	Livin' in a Hoe House
October 2	Shazzy	Attitude: A Hip Hop Rapsody
October 5	Movement Ex	Movement Ex
October 9	Paris	The Devil Made Me Do It
October 15	Chubb Rock	Treat 'Em Right (EP)
October 15	Father MC	Father's Day
October 15	Lakim Shabazz	The Lost Tribe of Shabazz
October 16	Grand Daddy I.U.	Smooth Assassin
October 16	Run-D.M.C.	Back from Hell
October 23	Joeski Love	Joe Cool
October 30	Monie Love	Down to Earth
October 30	Big Daddy Kane	Taste of Chocolate
October 30	Lighter Shade of Brown	Brown & Proud
November	D-Boy Rodriguez	Lyrical Strength of One Street Poet
November	Salt-N-Pepa	A Blitz of Salt-N-Pepa Hits
November 6	Barsha	Barsha's Explicit Lyrics
November 9	2 in a Room	Wiggle It
November 22	Malcolm McLaren and The World's Famous Supreme Team	Round the Outside!, Round the Outside!
November 27	Kid Rock	Grits Sandwiches for Breakfast
December 4	Brand Nubian	One for All
December 7	J.J. Fad	Not Just a Fad
December 18	C+C Music Factory	Gonna Make You Sweat
December 18	EPMD	Business as Usual
December 18	Ice Cube	Kill at Will (EP)
Unknown	JVC Force	Force Field
Unknown	Rated X	And Then Came Rated X
Unknown	London Posse	Gangster Chronicle

== Highest-charting singles ==
Hip hop singles from any year which charted in the 1990 Top 40 of the Billboard Hot 100
Song	Artist	Project	Peak position
"Ice Ice Baby"	Vanilla Ice	To the Extreme	1
"Pray"	MC Hammer	Please Hammer Don't Hurt 'Em	2
"Have You Seen Her"	MC Hammer	Please Hammer Don't Hurt 'Em	4
"U Can't Touch This"	MC Hammer	Please Hammer Don't Hurt 'Em	8
"Just a Friend"	Biz Markie	The Biz Never Sleeps	9
"Turtle Power!"	Partners in Kryme	Teenage Mutant Ninja Turtles: The Original Motion Picture Soundtrack	13

== See also ==
- Last article: 1989 in hip hop music
- Next article: 1991 in hip hop music
