= 1987 in hip-hop =

This article summarizes the events, album releases, and album release dates in hip-hop for the year 1987.

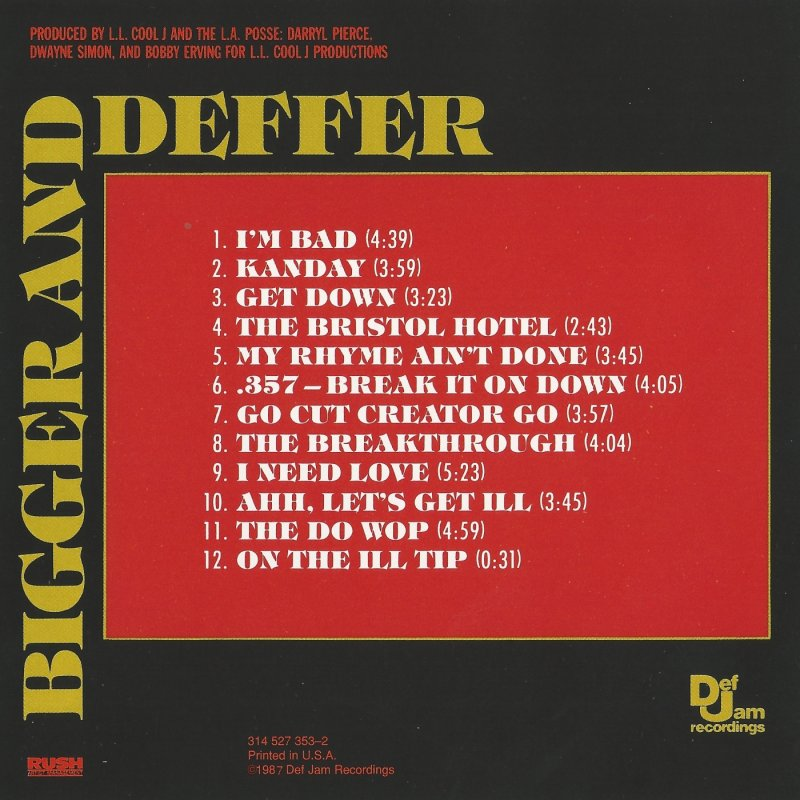
LL Cool J's 1987 sophomore release, Bigger and Deffer, stands as the artist's top selling album with over three million sales and charting the singles "I'm Bad" and "I Need Love".

== Released albums ==
Release Date	Artist	Album
February 10	Public Enemy	Yo! Bum Rush the Show
February 10	Spoonie Gee	The Godfather of Rap
March 3	Boogie Down Productions	Criminal Minded
April 7	DJ Jazzy Jeff & The Fresh Prince	Rock the House
May 22	Dana Dane	Dana Dane with Fame
May 29	LL Cool J	Bigger and Deffer
June 5	Michael Peace	RRock It Right
July 7	Eric B. & Rakim	Paid in Full
July 20	Too Short	Born to Mack
July 28	Ice-T	Rhyme Pays
August 8	MC Shan	Down by Law
August 12	MC Shy D	Got to Be Tough
August 14	The Fat Boys	Crushin'
August 27	Whodini	Open Sesame
September 13	Grandmaster Flash	Ba-Dop-Boom-Bang
September 15	UTFO	Lethal
October 13	Steady B	What's My Name
October 17	The Skinny Boys	Skinny & Proud
October 27	Heavy D & the Boyz	Living Large
November 3	Kool Moe Dee	How Ya Like Me Now
November 6	N.W.A	N.W.A. and the Posse
November 16	Various Artists	Less than Zero (soundtrack)
Unknown	Bobby Jimmy and the Critters	Black & Proud
Unknown	Gucci Crew II	So Def, So Fresh, So Stupid
Unknown	Boogie Down Productions	Man & His Music (Remixes from Around the World)
Unknown	Just-Ice	Kool & Deadly
Unknown	Kyper	Conceited
Unknown	MC ADE	Just Sumthin' to Do
Unknown	Surf MC's	Surf or Die
Unknown	T La Rock	Lyrical King (From the Boogie Down Bronx)
Unknown	Tuff Crew & Krown Rulers	Phanjam
Unknown	Gregory D & Mannie Fresh	Throwdown
Unknown	Various Artists	Christmas Rap
Unknown	Various Artists	Street Sounds Crucial Electro 3
Unknown	Various Artists	Street Sounds Hip Hop Electro 16

== Highest-charting singles ==
Hip hop singles from any year which charted in the 1987 Top 40 of the Billboard Hot 100
Song	Artist	Project	Peak position
"(You Gotta) Fight for Your Right (To Party!)"	Beastie Boys	Licensed to Ill	7
"I Need Love"	LL Cool J	Bigger & Deffer	14

== See also ==
- Last article: 1986 in hip hop music
- Next article: 1988 in hip hop music
