= 1988 in hip-hop =

This article summarizes the events, album releases, and album release dates in hip-hop for the year 1988.

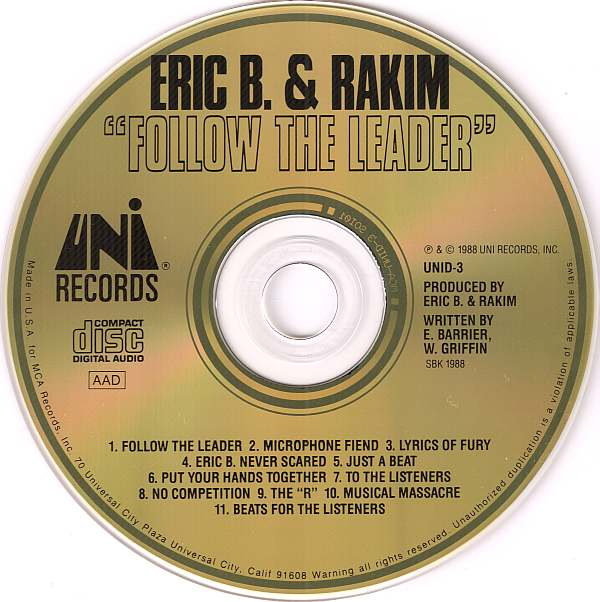
Eric B. & Rakim's 1988 sophomore album, Follow the Leader, earned an RIAA gold certification and many critically acclaimed reviews.

== Released albums ==
Release date	Artist	Album
January 31	Too Short	Life Is...Too Short
February 17	Ghetto Boys	Making Trouble
February 23	Biz Markie	Goin' Off
March 22	JVC Force	Doin' Damage
March 29	DJ Jazzy Jeff & The Fresh Prince	He's the DJ, I'm the Rapper
April	Mantronix	In Full Effect
April	Various Artists	School Daze: Original Motion Picture Soundtrack
April 12	Boogie Down Productions	By All Means Necessary
April 12	Grandmaster Flash and the Furious Five	On the Strength
April 19	MC Lyte	Lyte as a Rock
April 26	Various Artists	Colors (soundtrack)
May 16	Derek B	Bullet From A Gun
May 17	Run-D.M.C.	Tougher Than Leather
May 31	Busy Bee Starski	Running Thangs
May 31	Doug E. Fresh and the Get Fresh Crew	The World's Greatest Entertainer
June 3	Michael Peace	Rappin' Bold
June 3	Schoolly D	Smoke Some Kill
June 7	Audio Two	What More Can I Say?
June 7	EPMD	Strictly Business
June 15	J.J. Fad	Supersonic
June 15	Tuff Crew	Danger Zone
June 21	Stetsasonic	In Full Gear
June 28	Big Daddy Kane	Long Live the Kane
June 28	Public Enemy	It Takes a Nation of Millions to Hold Us Back
July 1	The Fat Boys	Coming Back Hard Again
July 13	MC Shy D	Comin' Correct in 88
July 26	Eric B. & Rakim	Follow the Leader
August 2	Rodney-O & Joe Cooley	Me and Joe
August 2	Salt-n-Pepa	A Salt with a Deadly Pepa
August 9	Rob Base and DJ E-Z Rock	It Takes Two
August 17	2 Live Crew	Move Somethin'
August 23	The Krown Rulers	Paper Chase
September 1	Sir Mix-A-Lot	Swass
September 12	Shinehead	Unity
September 13	Ice-T	Power
September 13	Steady B	Let the Hustlers Play
September 20	L'Trimm	Grab It!
September 20	Marley Marl	In Control, Volume 1
September 28	MC Hammer	Let's Get It Started
October 4	Ultramagnetic MC's	Critical Beatdown
October 7	Boogie Boys	Romeo Knight
October 14	The 7A3	Coolin' In Cali
October 25	MC Shan	Born to be Wild
October 26	Kid 'n Play	2 Hype
November 1	Slick Rick	The Great Adventures of Slick Rick
November 8	Jungle Brothers	Straight out the Jungle
November 15	King T	Act a Fool
November 22	Eazy-E	Eazy-Duz-It
November 22	Lakim Shabazz	Pure Righteousness
December 2	K-9 Posse	K-9 Posse
December 9	Three Times Dope	Original Stylin'
December 15	Various Artists	The First Priority Music Family: Basement Flavor
Unknown	Cold Crush Brothers	Troopers
Unknown	Chubb Rock	Chubb Rock (featuring Howie Tee)
Unknown	DJ Red Alert	We Can Do This
Unknown	The Fila Fresh Crew	Tuffest Man Alive
Unknown	Kaos	Court’s In Session
Unknown	Kid Flash	He's In Effect
Unknown	Kurtis Blow	Back By Popular Demand
Unknown	Miami Boyz	Getting Off
Unknown	Masters of Ceremony	Dynamite
Unknown	Numarx	Our Time Has Come
Unknown	Original Concept	Straight From the Basement of Kooley High!
Unknown	P.I.D.	Here We Are
Unknown	The 45 King	Master Of The Game
Unknown	The Skinny Boys	Skinny (They Can't Get Enough)
Unknown	Sweet Tee	It's Tee Time
Unknown	The Real Roxanne	The Real Roxanne
Unknown	Tall, Dark & Handsome	Tall, Dark & Handsome
Unknown	True Mathematics	Greatest Hits
Unknown	Various Artists	D.J. Mega Mix 1988 Bad Hip Hop
Unknown	Various Artists	I'm Gonna Git You Sucka (soundtrack)
Unknown	Whistle	Transformation

== Highest-charting singles ==
Hip hop singles from any year which charted in the 1988 Top 40 of the Billboard Hot 100
Song	Artist	Project	Peak position
"Going Back To Cali"	LL Cool J	Less than Zero (soundtrack)	31
"Da Butt"	E.U.	School Daze: Original Soundtrack Album	35
"It Takes Two"	Rob Base & DJ E-Z Rock	It Takes Two	36

== See also ==
- Last article: 1987 in hip hop music
- Next article: 1989 in hip hop music
