= 1989 in hip-hop =

This article summarizes the events, album releases, and album release dates in hip-hop for the year 1989.

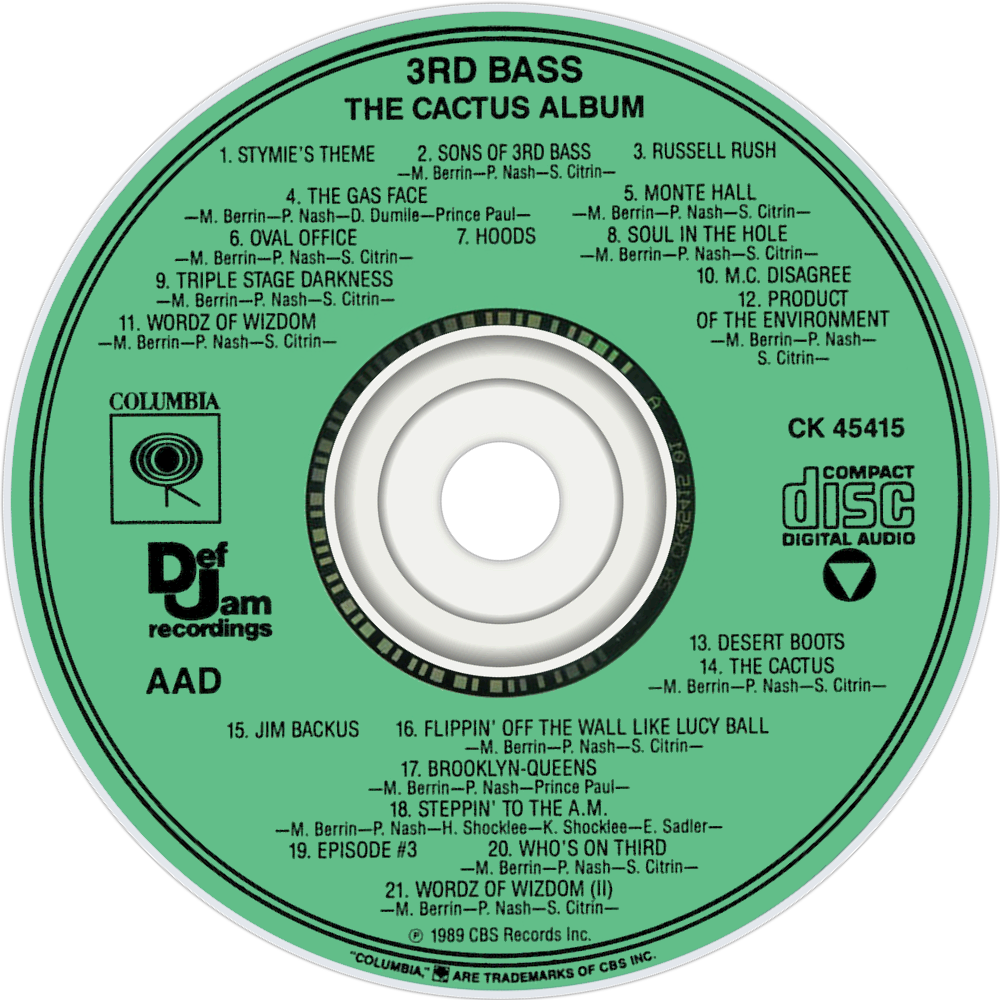
The Cactus Album by 3rd Bass is considered a critically acclaimed record that earned an RIAA gold certification.

== Released albums ==
Release Date	Artist	Album
January 1	The Fat Boys	On and On
January 23	Tone Lōc	Lōc-ed After Dark
January 24	N.W.A	Straight Outta Compton
January 31	Kwamé	Kwamé the Boy Genius: Featuring a New Beginning
February 6	Chubb Rock with Howie Tee	And the Winner Is...
February 7	2 Live Crew	As Nasty as They Wanna Be
March 3	De La Soul	3 Feet High and Rising
March 12	Ghetto Boys	Grip It! On That Other Level
March 14	Kool G Rap & DJ Polo	Road to the Riches
March 21	Oaktown's 357	Wild & Loose
May 2	The Jaz	Word to the Jaz
May 3	Just-Ice	The Desolate One
May 15	Stezo	Crazy Noise
May 16	Nice & Smooth	Nice & Smooth
May 16	Special Ed	Youngest in Charge
May 23	Chill Rob G	Ride the Rhythm
May 25	Party Posse	It's Party Time
May 30	Kool Moe Dee	Knowledge Is King
June 1	Egyptian Lover	King of Ecstasy
June 1	Michael Peace	Vigilante of Hope
June 6	Gang Starr	No More Mr. Nice Guy
June 9	LL Cool J	Walking with a Panther
June 12	Heavy D & The Boyz	Big Tyme
June 19	Breeze	The Young Son Of No One
June 23	Various Artists	Do the Right Thing (soundtrack)
July	Antoinette	Who's the Boss?
July 4	Boogie Down Productions	Ghetto Music: The Blueprint of Hip Hop
July 13	The D.O.C.	No One Can Do It Better
July 24	Redhead Kingpin and the F.B.I.	A Shade of Red
July 25	Beastie Boys	Paul's Boutique
July 27	Schoolly D	Am I Black Enough for You?
August 1	D-Boy Rodriguez	Plantin' a Seed
August 1	EPMD	Unfinished Business
August 4	2 in a Room	The Album - Vol. 1
August 8	Cool C	I Gotta Habit
August 15	DJ Magic Mike	DJ Magic Mike & The Royal Posse
August 16	Tuff Crew	Back to Wreck Shop
August 24	Doctor Ice	The Mic Stalker
August 29	Mellow Man Ace	Escape from Havana
September 1	End Time Warriors	E.T.W.
September 5	Young MC	Stone Cold Rhymin'
September 19	Big Daddy Kane	It's a Big Daddy Thing
September 27	Donald D	Notorious
September 27	Jesse West	No Prisoners
October 3	MC Lyte	Eyes on This
October 10	Biz Markie	The Biz Never Sleeps
October 10	Ice-T	The Iceberg/Freedom of Speech... Just Watch What You Say!
October 17	DJ Chuck Chillout & Kool Chip	Masters of Rhythm
October 17	Sir Mix-a-Lot	Seminar
October 20	Roxanne Shanté	Bad Sister
October 23	Divine Styler	Word Power
October 24	Craig G	The Kingpin
October 27	T La Rock	On a Warpath
October 31	DJ Jazzy Jeff & the Fresh Prince	And in This Corner...
October 31	Freddie Foxxx	Freddie Foxxx Is Here
October 31	Ms. Melodie	Diva
November 7	Jungle Brothers	Done by the Forces of Nature
November 7	Queen Latifah	All Hail the Queen
November 14	3rd Bass	The Cactus Album
November 14	Def Jef	Just a Poet with Soul
November 17	Rob Base	The Incredible Base
November 28	Arabian Prince	Where's My Bytches
November 28	Technotronic	Pump Up the Jam
December 5	The New Style	Independent Leaders
December 21	Willie D	Controversy
Unknown	Blackmale	Let It Swing
Unknown	Black, Rock and Ron	Stop the World
Unknown	Enjoy! Records	The Best of Enjoy! Records
Unknown	Esham	Boomin' Words from Hell
Unknown	Grandmaster Melle Mel and the Furious Five	Piano
Unknown	Gregory D & Mannie Fresh	D Rules the Nation
Unknown	I.M.P.	No Prisoners (EP)
Unknown	LA Dream Team	Back to Black
Unknown	Mac Dre	Young Black Brotha
Unknown	Maestro Fresh Wes	Symphony in Effect
Unknown	Magnetic Force	12/52/365
Unknown	MC ADE	How Much Can You Take
Unknown	Nu Sounds	Mackin'
Unknown	Success-n-Effect	In the Hood
Unknown	The U-Krew	The U-Krew
Unknown	Various Artists	Miami Bass Machine
Unknown	Various Artists	Never Stop's Under Ground Rap Roster - Booty Shakin' Breakout
Unknown	Various Artists	Roughouse Orchestra

== Highest-charting singles ==
Hip hop singles from any year which charted in the 1989 Top 40 of the Billboard Hot 100
Song	Artist	Project	Peak position
"Wild Thing"	Tone Lōc	Lōc-ed After Dark	2
"Funky Cold Medina"	Tone Lōc	Lōc-ed After Dark	3
"Buffalo Stance"	Neneh Cherry	Raw Like Sushi	3
"Bust A Move"	Young MC	Stone Cold Rhymin'	7
"Pump Up the Jam"	Technotronic	Pump Up the Jam: The Album	7
"I'm That Type of Guy"	LL Cool J	Walking with a Panther	15
"Me So Horny"	2 Live Crew	As Nasty As They Wanna Be	26
"Me, Myself & I"	De La Soul	3 Feet High and Rising	34
"Hey Ladies"	Beastie Boys	Paul's Boutique	36

== See also ==
- Last article: 1988 in hip hop music
- Next article: 1990 in hip hop music
