= 1986 in hip-hop =

This article summarizes the events, album releases, and album release dates in hip-hop for the year 1986.

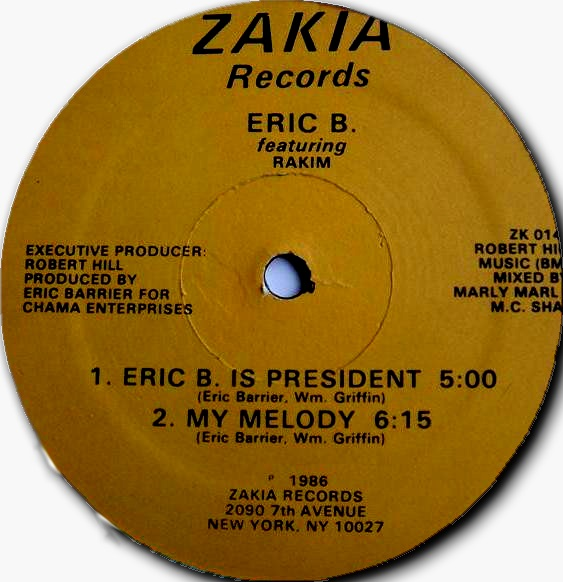
Eric B. & Rakim began their critically acclaimed partnership in 1986 with the release of "Eric B. is President" / "My Melody".

== Released albums ==
Release Date	Artist	Album
March 2	Grandmaster Flash	The Source
March 15	UTFO	Skeezer Pleezer
March 31	Boogie Boys	Survival of the Freshest
April 29	Whodini	Back in Black
May	Mantronix	Music Madness
May 3	Just-Ice	Back to the Old School
May 6	The Fat Boys	Big & Beautiful
May 9	World Class Wrecking Cru	Rapped in Romance
May 15	Run-D.M.C.	Raising Hell
June 15	Kurtis Blow	Kingdom Blow
June 15	Whistle	Whistle
July 7	Doug E. Fresh & the Get Fresh Crew	Oh My God!
July 25	Steady B	Bring the Beat Back
July 25	2 Live Crew	The 2 Live Crew Is What We Are
August 13	MC Hammer	Feel My Power
September 2	LA Dream Team	Kings of the West Coast
October 1	Kool Moe Dee	Kool Moe Dee
October 15	Stetsasonic	On Fire
November 5	Too Short	Raw, Uncut and X-Rated
November 15	Beastie Boys	Licensed to Ill
December 1	Afrika Bambaataa & Soul Sonic Force	Planet Rock: The Album
December 8	Salt-n-Pepa	Hot, Cool & Vicious
Unknown	Bobby Jimmy and the Critters	Roaches: The Beginning
Unknown	Egyptian Lover	One Track Mind
Unknown	Lovebug Starski	House Rocker
Unknown	M.C. Chill	M.C. Chill
Unknown	The Skinny Boys	Weightless
Unknown	The World's Famous Supreme Team	Rappin'
Unknown	Warp 9	Fade in, Fade Out
Unknown	Schoolly D	Saturday Night! – The Album
Unknown	Rappers Convention	Rappers Convention
Unknown	Various Artists	Street Sounds Hip Hop Electro 11
Unknown	Various Artists	Street Sounds Hip Hop Electro 12
Unknown	Various Artists	Street Sounds Hip Hop Electro 13
Unknown	Various Artists	Street Sounds Hip Hop Electro 14
Unknown	Various Artists	Street Sounds Hip Hop Electro 15
Unknown	Various Artists	Mr. Magic's Rap Attack Volume 2
Unknown	Various Artists	Uptown Is Kickin' It

== Highest-charting singles ==
Hip hop singles from any year which charted in the 1986 Top 40 of the Billboard Hot 100
Song	Artist	Project	Peak position
"Walk This Way"	Run-D.M.C. featuring Aerosmith	Raising Hell	4
"You Be Illin'"	Run-D.M.C.	Raising Hell	29

== See also ==
- Last article: 1985 in hip hop music
- Next article: 1987 in hip hop music

== Footnotes ==
=== References ===
- Coleman, Brian (2009). Check the Technique: Liner Notes for Hip-Hop Junkies. Random House Publishing Group. ISBN 978-0-307-49442-9.
