= 1991 in hip-hop =

This article summarizes the events, album releases, and album release dates in hip-hop for the year 1991.

== Released albums ==
Release Date	Artist	Album
January 12	Downtown Science	Downtown Science
January 15	Digital Underground	This Is an EP Release
January 15	DJ Quik	Quik Is the Name
January 15	Gang Starr	Step in the Arena
January 29	Gerardo	Mo' Ritmo
February 4	Inner City Posse	Dog Beats
February 5	Stetsasonic	Blood, Sweat & No Tears
February 5	Lifers Group	#66064
February 5	UTFO	Bag It & Bone It
February 11	Another Bad Creation	Coolin' at the Playground Ya Know!
February 19	GZA	Words from the Genius
February 19	Kid Capri	The Tape
February 19	Young Black Teenagers	Young Black Teenagers
March 1	O.G. Style	I Know How to Play 'Em
March 5	Ed O.G. & Da Bulldogs	Life of a Kid in the Ghetto
March 5	Various Artists	New Jack City (soundtrack)
March 12	Boogie Down Productions	Live Hardcore Worldwide
March 12	K-9 Posse	On a Different Tip
March 19	Whodini	Bag-A-Trix
March 19	Craig G	Now, That's More Like It
March 19	Yo-Yo	Make Way for the Motherlode
March 26	Mantronix	The Incredible Sound Machine
March 26	Various Artists	Teenage Mutant Ninja Turtles II: The Secret of the Ooze: The Original Motion Picture Soundtrack
April 2	Redhead Kingpin	The Album with No Name
April 2	Rappin' Is Fundamental	The Doo-Hop Legacy
April 23	Dream Warriors	And Now the Legacy Begins
May 7	Dynamic Twins	Word 2 the Wize
May 7	Terminator X	Terminator X & The Valley of the Jeep Beets
May 14	De La Soul	De La Soul Is Dead
May 14	Ice-T	O.G. Original Gangster
May 14	KMD	Mr. Hood
May 14	Chubb Rock	The One
May 14	Son of Bazerk	Bazerk Bazerk Bazerk
May 21	KMC	Three Men with the Power of Ten
May 28	N.W.A	Niggaz4Life
June 1	Convicts	Convicts
June 4	The Dogs	Beware of The Dogs
June 10	Success-n-Effect	Back-n-Effect
June 11	Kool Moe Dee	Funke, Funke Wisdom
June 11	Sway & King Tech	Concrete Jungle
June 11	Diamond Shell	The Grand Imperial Diamond Shell
June 14	3rd Bass	Derelicts of Dialect
June 18	Tuff Crew	Still Dangerous
June 25	Pete Rock & CL Smooth	All Souled Out
July 2	Heavy D & The Boyz	Peaceful Journey
July 2	Kokane	Addictive Hip Hop Muzick
July 2	Leaders of the New School	A Future Without a Past...
July 2	Slick Rick	The Ruler's Back
July 2	2 Black 2 Strong	Doin' Hard Time on Planet Earth
July 9	Geto Boys	We Can't Be Stopped
July 9	Overweight Pooch	Female Preacher
July 9	Various Artists	Boyz n the Hood soundtrack
July 16	Compton's Most Wanted	Straight Checkn 'Em
July 16	Godfather Don	Hazardous
July 16	PHD	Without Warning
July 16	Larry Larr	Da Wizzard Of Odds
July 17	Candyman	Playtime's Over
July 23	DJ Jazzy Jeff & The Fresh Prince	Homebase
July 23	Marky Mark and the Funky Bunch	Music for the People
July 23	Main Source	Breaking Atoms
August 6	P.M. Dawn	Of the Heart, of the Soul and of the Cross: The Utopian Experience
August 6	Latin Alliance	Latin Alliance
August 6	The Posse NFX	Black Or Ya White
August 6	Oaktown's 357	Fully Loaded
August 13	Cypress Hill	Cypress Hill
August 13	MC Breed & DFC	MC Breed & DFC
August 13	Funkytown Pros	Reachin' AaLevel of Assassination
August 13	Two Kings in a Cipher	From Pyramids to Projects
August 20	M-Doc	Universal Poet
August 27	Biz Markie	I Need a Haircut
September 3	Naughty by Nature	Naughty by Nature
September 3	Nice & Smooth	Ain't a Damn Thing Changed
September 3	Poor Righteous Teachers	Pure Poverty
September 3	Queen Latifah	Nature of a Sista'
September 3	Nikki D	Daddy's Little Girl
September 3	Greyson & Jason	Sweatin' Me Wet
September 6	2nd II None	2nd II None
September 13	Master P	Get Away Clean
September 17	MC Lyte	Act Like You Know
September 17	WC and the Maad Circle	Ain't a Damn Thang Changed
September 17	Yomo & Maulkie	Are U Xperienced?
September 17	Powerule	Volume 1
September 22	Def Jef	Soul Food
September 24	A Tribe Called Quest	The Low End Theory
September 24	Kid 'n Play	Face the Nation
September 26	Lance Romance	Fortune & Fame
October	MC ADE	An All Out Bash
October 1	Marley Marl	In Control Volume II (For Your Steering Pleasure)
October 1	Public Enemy	Apocalypse 91... The Enemy Strikes Back
October 3	415	Nu N***** on tha Blokkk
October 7	Grandmaster Flash & The Furious Five	Grandmaster Flash, Melle Mel & The Furious Five – Greatest Hits
October 7	Salt-N-Pepa	The Greatest Hits
October 8	Freestyle Fellowship	To Whom It May Concern...
October 8	Scarface	Mr. Scarface Is Back
October 8	2 Live Crew	Sports Weekend (As Nasty as They Wanna Be Part II)
October 8	Various Artists	Cool as Ice (soundtrack)
October 15	Digital Underground	Sons of the P
October 15	U.M.C.'s	Fruits of Nature
October 15	Schoolly D	How a Black Man Feels
October 15	Various Artists	House Party 2 (soundtrack)
October 22	Black Sheep	A Wolf In Sheep's Clothing
October 22	Del the Funky Homosapien	I Wish My Brother George Was Here
October 28	The Fat Boys	Mack Daddy
October 29	Big Daddy Kane	Prince of Darkness
October 29	Ice Cube	Death Certificate
October 29	Organized Konfusion	Organized Konfusion
October 29	Hammer	Too Legit to Quit
October 29	Various Artists	Strictly Business (soundtrack)
November 6	Run-D.M.C.	Together Forever: Greatest Hits 1983-1991
November 7	Maestro Fresh Wes	The Black Tie Affair
November 12	Raw Fusion	Live from the Styleetron
November 12	Tim Dog	Penicillin on Wax
November 12	2Pac	2Pacalypse Now
November 19	Tone Lōc	Cool Hand Lōc
November 26	D-Nice	To tha Rescue
December 3	AMG	Bitch Betta Have My Money
December 10	Hi-C	Skanless
December 31	Various Artists	Juice soundtrack

== Highest-charting singles ==
Hip-hop singles from any year which charted in the 1991 Top 40 of the Billboard Hot 100
Song	Artist	Project	Peak position
"Gonna Make You Sweat (Everybody Dance Now)"	C+C Music Factory featuring Freedom Williams	Gonna Make You Sweat	1
"Here We Go (Let's Rock & Roll)"	C+C Music Factory featuring Freedom Williams & Zelma Davis	Gonna Make You Sweat	3
"Play That Funky Music"	Vanilla Ice	To the Extreme	4
"O.P.P."	Naughty By Nature	Naughty By Nature	6
"Rico Suave"	Gerardo	Mo' Ritmo	7
"Iesha"	Another Bad Creation	Coolin' at the Playground Ya Know!	9
"Around The Way Girl"	LL Cool J	Mama Said Knock You Out	9
"Playground"	Another Bad Creation	Coolin' at the Playground Ya Know!	10
"Mama Said Knock You Out"	LL Cool J	Mama Said Knock You Out	17
"You Can't Play With My Yo-Yo"	Yo-Yo featuring Ice Cube	Make Way for the Motherlode	36

== See also ==
- Last article: 1990 in hip-hop
- Next article: 1992 in hip-hop
