= ETW =

ETW may refer to:

- East to West (duo), an American Contemporary Christian music duo active 1993–1997
- Eastern Trombone Workshop, one of the largest annual events for trombone in the world, held at Brucker Hall in Fort Myer, Virginia
- Empire: Total War, a strategy game by Creative Assembly
- End Time Warriors, an American Christian rap group active 1989–1997
- E.T.W. (album), a 1989 album by End Time Warriors
- The European Transonic Wind Tunnel, a high-Reynolds-number transonic wind tunnel using nitrogen as test gas
- Event Tracing for Windows, a software analysis tool
