= Got to Be Tough =

Got to Be Tough may refer to:

- Got to Be Tough (MC Shy D album), 1987
- Got to Be Tough (Toots and the Maytals album), 2020
