= Mixmaster =

Mixmaster may refer to:

== Equipment and technology ==
- Sunbeam Mixmaster, an electric kitchen mixer that was the flagship product of Sunbeam Products
  - Mix Diskerud, United States professional soccer player nicknamed after the mixer
- Mixmaster anonymous remailer, a Type II anonymous remailer network software
- Douglas XB-42 Mixmaster, a prototype American bomber
- A nickname for the Cessna Skymaster airplane

== Music ==
- Mixmaster Morris or Morris Gould (born 1965), English ambient DJ and underground musician
- Mix Master Mike (born 1970), American turntablist and contributing member of the Beastie Boys
- Mixmaster Spade, an early gangsta rap performer in West Coast hip hop
- Mixmaster Gee, an artist featured on 1987 album Street Sounds Crucial Electro 3
- Alternate name of Black Box (band), an italo-house musical act

== Other uses ==
- Mixmaster (Transformers), a Constructicon
- Mixmaster universe, a cosmological model proposed by Charles W. Misner
- Mixmaster dynamics, the sensitivity of particles permitted to collapse under the force of gravity
- Cicurina mixmaster, a spider in the genus Cicurina
- A complex stack interchange between divided highways
