= Strong Island =

Strong Island may refer to:

- Strong Island (film)
- Strong Island in Pleasant Bay, Cape Cod, Massachusetts
- Strong Island (Michigan), in River Raisin near Lake Erie
- "Strong Island", a song by JVC Force from Doin' Damage, 1987
