= Who's the Boss? (disambiguation) =

Who's the Boss? is an American sitcom series.

Who's the Boss? or Who's the Boss may also refer to:

- Who's the Boss? (album), a 1989 album by Antoinette
- Who's the Boss (album), a 2006 album by St. Lunatics
- Who's the Boss? (2013 film), a Dominican Republic Spanish-language comedy film
- Who's the Boss (2020 film), a Nigerian English-language romantic comedy film

== See also ==
- Who's Boss?, a 1914 silent film
