= Get a Grip (disambiguation) =

Get a Grip is a 1993 Aerosmith album and its title track.

Get a Grip may also refer to:

- Get a Grip (TV series)
- "Get a Grip" (The Boomtown Rats song)
- "Get a Grip" (Semisonic song)

== See also ==
- Gotta Get a Grip (disambiguation)
- "(Get A) Grip (On Yourself)", also known as "Grip", a single by The Stranglers
