= City Life (Boogie Boys album) =

Studio album by the Boogie Boys
- Released: February 18, 1985
- Genre: Golden age hip-hop
- Length: 37:06
- Label: Capitol
- Producer: David Spradley; Ted Currier

The Boogie Boys chronology
| City Life (1985) | Survival of the Freshest (1986) |

Professional ratings
Review scores
| Source | Rating |
|---|---|
| AllMusic | 2/5 stars |
| Christgau's Record Guide | B− |

City Life is the debut studio album by American hip-hop group the Boogie Boys, released on February 18, 1985, by Capitol Records. The album peaked at No. 53 on the Billboard 200. The album had a major hit in America with the single "A Fly Girl."

== "A Fly Girl" ==
As one of the first rap groups to sign with a major label, the Boogie Boys were under pressure to create a fresh, new sound. Capitol wanted to release "City Life" as their first single as they felt it would have broader appeal, especially since the song combined rapping and singing. But the Boogie Boys felt "A Fly Girl" would have more impact.

Boogie Boys member Joe "Romeo J.D." Malloy said:

"Put 'Fly Girl' first, then we can come with the other stuff." So we compromised: we put out "City Life" as the A-side and "Fly Girl" as the B-side; so when it came out, DJs were like, "yeah, 'City Life' is hot," but then when they flipped it over and heard those drums it was like, "oh s--t… what's this?" So that's how it jumped off; and the streets is gonna make happen what they want to happen. So "Fly Girl" is the record that popped off and they still didn't do a video for it. People were running in the stores trying to find "Fly Girl" for weeks and weeks, and they didn't have any copies in the stores.

== Track listing ==
1. "Runnin' from Your Love" – 4:58
2. "Do or Die" – 4:52
3. "Break Dancer" – 3:23
4. "A Fly Girl" – 5:51
5. "City Life" – 4:55
6. "Party Asteroid" – 5:26
7. "You Ain't Fresh" – 3:50
8. "Shake and Break" – 3:51

== Personnel ==
Boogie Boys

- William "Boogie Knight" Stroman – vocals
- Joe "Romeo J.D." Malloy – vocals
- Rudy "Lil' Rahiem" Sheriff – vocals

Production

- David Spradley – producer
- Ted Currier – producer
- Bob Rosa – engineer
- Steve Peck – engineer

== Charts ==
| Chart (1985) | Peak position |
|---|---|
| Billboard 200 | 56 |
| Billboard R&B/HipHop | 6 |

== Charting Singles ==
| Year | Title | US R&B Chart | US Top 100 |
|---|---|---|---|
| 1985 | "You Ain't Fresh (High Noon Mix)" | 60 | - |
| 1985 | "A Fly Girl" | 6 | 102 |
