= Got to Be Tough (MC Shy D album) =

Studio album by MC Shy D
- Released: August 12, 1987
- Recorded: 1986–1987
- Studio: BRT (Fort Lauderdale, Florida)
- Genre: Hip hop
- Length: 47:00
- Label: Luke
- Producer: Luke; MC Shy D; DJ Man (co.); Rodney "Kool Collie" Terry (co.)

MC Shy D chronology
Got to Be Tough (1987)	Comin' Correct in 88 (1988)

Professional ratings
Review scores
Source	Rating
AllMusic	3/5 stars
RapReviews	5.5/10

Got to Be Tough is the debut studio album by American rapper and producer MC Shy-D. It was released on August 12, 1987, via Luke Skyywalker Records. The album peaked at number 197 on the Billboard 200 and number 41 on the Top R&B Albums chart.

== Track listing ==
Got to Be Tough track listing
No.	Title	Length
1.	"I've Got to Be Tough"	4:54
2.	"Yes Yes Y'all"	4:10
3.	"DJ Man Cuts It up (Part 2)"	3:25
4.	"So Take That"	4:27
5.	"Shy-D's Theme"	2:47
6.	"Paula's on Crack"	4:21
7.	"I'm Not a Star"	3:39
8.	"We Don't Play (Live)"	5:51
9.	"Bust This"	2:48
10.	"Rap Will Never Die (Part 2)"	4:27
11.	"Don't Take Me Seriously"	2:42
12.	"I Will Go Off"	4:12
Total length:		47:00

Sample credits

- Track 1 contains elements from "Brazilian Rhyme (Beijo Interlude)" by Earth, Wind & Fire (1977)
- Track 2 contains elements from "Ike's Mood I" by Isaac Hayes (1970) and "(Sittin' On) The Dock of the Bay" by Otis Redding (1968)
- Track 3 contains elements from "Rock Steady" by Aretha Franklin (1971), "Pump Me Up" by Trouble Funk (1982) and "(Nothing Serious) Just Buggin'" by Whistle (1986)
- Track 4 contains elements from "I'll Be There" by The Jackson 5 (1970), "Christmas Rappin'" by Kurtis Blow (1979) and "La Di Da Di" by Doug E. Fresh & Slick Rick (1985)
- Track 5 contains elements from "Brazilian Rhyme (Beijo Interlude)" by Earth, Wind & Fire (1977) and "Catch a Groove" by Juice (1976)
- Track 6 contains elements from "I Can't Live Without My Radio" by LL Cool J (1985) and "Change the Beat (Female Version)" by Beside (1982)
- Track 8 contains elements from "Celebrate the Good Things" by Pleasure (1978)
- Track 9 contains elements from "I Don't Wanna Lose Your Love" by The Emotions (1976), "Set It Off" by Strafe (1984) and "Dance to the Drummer's Beat" by Herman Kelly & Life (1978)
- Track 10 contains elements from "Got to Be Real" by Cheryl Lynn (1978), "It's a Shame" by The Spinners (1970) and "Good Times" by Chic (1979)
- Track 12 contains elements from "Good Times" by Chic (1979), "Bang Zoom (Let's Go-Go)" by The Real Roxanne & Howie Tee (1986) and "Tough" by Kurtis Blow (1982)

== Personnel ==
- Peter T. Jones – main artist, vocals, scratches, producer, mixing, arranging
- DJ Man – scratches, co-producer
- Rodney Cedric Terry – design, mixing, co-producer
- Luther Campbell – executive producer
- Norm Titcomb – mixing, recording
- Michael Fuller – mastering
- Rose Campbell – artwork
- Ed Robinson – photography

== Charts ==
Chart performance for Got to Be Tough
Chart (1987)	Peak position
US Billboard 200	197
US Top R&B/Hip-Hop Albums (Billboard)	41
