= Gotta Get a Grip =

Gotta Get a Grip may refer to:

- Gotta Get a Grip (album), an album by MC Trouble
- "Gotta Get a Grip" (song), a song by Mick Jagger
