= Street Sounds Crucial Electro 3 =

Compilation album by various artists
- Released: 1987
- Genre: Electro music, old school hip hop
- Length: 44:12
- Label: StreetSounds

Street Sounds Crucial Electro 3 is the third compilation album in a series and was released 1987 on the StreetSounds label. The album was released on LP and cassette and contains twenty electro music and old school hip hop tracks mixed by Herbie Laidley.

== Track listing ==
Side one
No.	Title	Artist	Length
1.	"Alice"	Full Force	2:42
2.	"Can You Feel It"	Original Concept	2:39
3.	"(Nothing Serious) Just Buggin'"	Whistle	2:07
4.	"Bassline"	Mantronix	1:56
5.	"Bite This"	Roxanne Shanté	2:18
6.	"Megamix II: Why Is It Fresh"	D.ST.	2:02
7.	"Itchiban Scratch"	Chris "The Glove" Taylor	2:19
8.	"Jam On Revenge (The Wikki Wikki Song)"	Newcleus	2:02
9.	"Running"	Information Society	1:34
10.	"808 Beats"	The Unknown DJ	1:57

Side two
No.	Title	Artist	Length
1.	"Broadway"	Duke Bootee	2:18
2.	"Hold It, Now Hit It"	Beastie Boys	1:37
3.	"South Bronx"	Boogie Down Productions	2:14
4.	"Girls Ain't Nothing But Trouble"	DJ Jazzy Jeff & The Fresh Prince	1:53
5.	"Friends"	Whodini	2:48
6.	"Mr. Big Stuff"	Heavy D. & The Boyz	1:42
7.	"Rock The Bells"	LL Cool J	2:43
8.	"The Manipulator"	Mixmaster Gee and The Turntable Orchestra	2:27
9.	"Roxanne, Roxanne"	UTFO	2:48
10.	"The Show"	Doug E. Fresh and The Get Fresh Crew	1:54
