= Don't Sweat Me =

Studio album by MC Shy D
- Released: 1990
- Recorded: 1989–1990
- Studio: C.S.I. Studios (Hollywood, Florida)
- Genre: Hip hop
- Length: 38:00
- Label: Benz; On Top
- Producer: MC Shy D; DJ Toomp; Michael Sterling

MC Shy D chronology
| Comin' Correct in 88 (1988) | Don't Sweat Me (1990) | The Comeback (1993) |

Professional ratings
Review scores
| Source | Rating |
|---|---|
| AllMusic | 2/5 stars |

Don't Sweat Me is the third studio album by American rapper and producer M.C. Shy-D. It was released in 1990 via Benz Records Inc. and On Top Records. The album peaked at number 80 on the Top R&B Albums chart, and the title track single peaked at number 16 on the Hot Rap Songs chart.

== Track listing ==
Don't Sweat Me track listing
| No. | Title | Length |
|---|---|---|
| 1. | "I Am Back" | 3:35 |
| 2. | "Don't Sweat Me" | 5:15 |
| 3. | "Got It Good" | 3:51 |
| 4. | "You Are Everything" | 5:28 |
| 5. | "Groove" | 4:21 |
| 6. | "Whats All This About" | 4:02 |
| 7. | "I Can Make You Dance" | 3:31 |
| 8. | "Work It" | 4:03 |
| 9. | "G.T.F.O.M.F.B." | 4:03 |
| Total length: | | 36:00 |

== Personnel ==
- Peter T. Jones – main artist, vocals, producer, executive producer, programming, arranging
- Aldrin Davis – scratches, producer, artwork
- Michael Dennis Johnson – producer, mixing, recording, arranging (track 4)
- Peter Langone – photography

== Charts ==
Album

Chart performance for Don't Sweat Me
| Chart (1990) | Peak position |
|---|---|
| US Top R&B/Hip-Hop Albums (Billboard) | 80 |

Singles

Chart performance of singles from Don't Sweat Me
| Year | Song | Peak positions |
| Year | Song | US Rap |
|---|---|---|
| 1990 | "Don't Sweat Me" | 16 |
| 1990 | "Groove" | — |
