= Street Sounds Hip Hop Electro 15 =

Compilation album by various artists
- Released: 1986
- Genre: Electro music, old school hip hop
- Label: StreetSounds

Street Sounds Hip Hop Electro 15 is the fifteenth compilation album in a series and was released in 1986 on the StreetSounds label. The album was released on LP and cassette and contains eight electro music and old school hip hop tracks mixed by Herbie Laidley. The LP came with a bonus 7" single record with "The Man Marley Marl" by Marley Marl on the A-side, and "Stronger Than Strong (Remix)" by Faze One on the B-side. Track four on side one was released the following year as "South Bronx" by Boogie Down Productions.

== Track listing ==
Side one
No.	Title	Artist	Length
1.	"Broadway"	Duke Bootee	-:--
2.	"Awesome"	Skinny Boys	-:--
3.	"The Bronx"	Kurtis Blow	-:--
4.	"South Bronx"	DJ Scott La Rock, Blastmaster K.R.S. One & D-Nice	-:--

Side two
No.	Title	Artist	Length
1.	"Cold Gettin' Dumb"	Just-Ice	-:--
2.	"Layin' Down A Beat (Censored Version)"	Faze One	-:--
3.	"Greedy Girls (Extended Version)"	The Move	-:--
4.	"Bongo Beat"	Captain Rock	-:--
