= Let It Roll (Doug Lazy song) =

1989 song by Doug Lazy

"Let It Roll" is a song by DJ/producer Doug Lazy, released as a single in 1989. It was credited as Raze presents Doug Lazy, and was the first of three number-one dance singles for Lazy. The song reached number one on the U.S. Dance chart for one week in August 1989.

== Charts ==
Chart (1989)	Peak position
U.S. Billboard Hot Dance Club Play	1
