= K-9 Bass =

Studio album by The Dogs
- Released: November 17, 1992
- Recorded: 1991–1992
- Genre: Hip hop, sex rap, Miami bass, Southern hip hop
- Length: 38:06
- Label: Joey Boy Records
- Producer: The Dogs, Carleton Mills, Calvin Mills

The Dogs chronology
Beware of The Dogs (1991)	K-9 Bass (1992)

K-9 Bass is the third and final album released by rap group the Dogs. It was released on November 17, 1992 through Joey Boy Records and featured production from the Dogs, Carleton Mills and Calvin Mills. By the time this album was released, Disco Rick and Cracked Up had left the group, leaving just Keith Bell and Labrant Dennis as the only two members of the Dogs. K-9 Bass was not a success, only peaking at No. 95 on the Top R&B/Hip-Hop Albums chart.

== Track listings ==
=== Explicit ===
1. "Outta Gas"- 3:20
2. "Shake Dance"- 3:14
3. "Suck It Before I Fuck It"- 2:59
4. "Gimme, Gimme, Gimme"- 3:16
5. "Mutt Them Hoes"- 3:36
6. "It's Time to Groove"- 4:00
7. "DoggaMixxx II"- 3:19
8. "Dookie Shoot"- 3:32
9. "Pass the Pussy"- 3:58
10. "Broamin"- 3:41
11. "The Bite Has Begun"- 2:34

=== Clean ===
1. "Outta Gas"- 3:20
2. "Shake Dance"- 3:14
3. "Lick It Before I Stick it"- 2:59
4. "Gimme, Gimme, Gimme"- 3:16
5. "Mutt Them Girls"- 3:36
6. "It's Time to Groove"- 4:00
7. "DoggaMixxx II"- 3:19
8. "Dookie Shoot" - 3:32
9. "Pass the Coochie"- 3:58
10. "Broamin"- 3:41
11. "The Bite Has Begun"- 2:34
