= Burnin' at 20 Below =

Studio album by Antoinette
- Released: May 30, 1990
- Recorded: 1989–1990
- Genre: Golden age hip hop
- Label: Next Plateau Entertainment
- Producer: DJ Doc, Kurtis Mantronik, Ellis Jay, Kenni Hairston

Antoinette chronology
Who's the Boss? (1989)	Burnin' at 20 Below (1990)

Singles from Lyte as a Rock
- 1. "Never Get Enough" Released: May 29, 1990; 2. "She Operates around the Clock" Released: 1990

Professional ratings
Review scores
Source	Rating
allmusic	4.5/5 stars

Burnin' at 20 Below is the second and final album released by the rapper Antoinette, which released on May 30, 1990, on Next Plateau Entertainment. Production was by DJ Doc, Kurtis Mantronik, Ellis Jay, and Kenni Hairston. The album peaked at No. 66 on the Billboard Top R&B Albums chart. Singles from the album were "Never Get Enough" and "She Operates Around the Clock", but failed to chart.

== Track listing ==
1. "Bring It Home"- 3:50
2. "Who Gives the Orders (Interrupted by If the Price Is Right)"- 6:36
3. "She Operates around the Clock"- 4:29
4. "Let's Take it from the Top"- 3:30
5. "The Fox that Rox the Box"- 4:00
6. "I Wanna be Me"- 4:45
7. "Love or Hype" [Remix]- 4:35
8. "Never Get Enough"- 4:45
9. "You Got What I Need"- 5:00
10. "In My House" [Remix]- 4:10
11. "It's Your Thing"- 4:28
