= Doug Lazy =

Doug Lazy (real name Gene Douglas Finley) is an American hip hop and dance music producer and DJ from Washington, D.C.

Before getting into music, he was a radio DJ known as Mean Gene in his home city.

Lazy scored a number of hip house hits in the late 1980s and early 1990s on the Hot Dance Music/Club Play chart, including three number ones: "Let It Roll", "Let the Rhythm Pump", and "H.O.U.S.E.". In 1990, Ben E. King and Bo Diddley featuring Lazy recorded a rap version of the Monotones' 1958 hit song "Book of Love" for the soundtrack of the movie Book of Love.

== Discography ==
=== Albums ===
- Doug Lazy Gettin' Crazy (1990), Atlantic Records

=== Singles ===
- "Let It Roll" (1989), Atlantic Records ^
- "Let the Rhythm Pump" (1989), Atlantic Records
- "Can't Hold Back (U No)" (1990), Atlantic Records
- "Can't Get Enough" (1990), ZYX Records
- "H.O.U.S.E." (1990), Atlantic Records
- "Din Daa Daa's Doin It" (1991), Cardiac Records
- "Ride on the Rhythm" (1991), Atlantic Records ^^

^Credited to Raze presents Doug Lazy

^^Credited to Little Louie & Marc Anthony

== See also ==
- List of number-one dance hits (United States)
- List of artists who reached number one on the US Dance chart
