= Skinny (They Can't Get Enough) =

Studio album by The Skinny Boys
- Released: 1988
- Recorded: 1987–1988
- Genre: Hip hop
- Label: Jive Records, RCA Records
- Producer: Mark Bush

The Skinny Boys chronology
Skinny & Proud (1987)	Skinny (They Can't Get Enough) (1988)

Professional ratings
Review scores
Source	Rating
AllMusic	link

Skinny (They Can't Get Enough) is the third and final studio album by rap group The Skinny Boys. It was released in 1988 for Jive Records, distributed by RCA Records and was produced by Mark Bush. Skinny (They Can't Get Enough) peaked at No. 71 on the Billboard Top R&B/Hip-Hop Albums chart.

== Track listing ==
1. "Skinny (They Can't Get Enough)" – 3:43
2. "Mystery" – 4:00
3. "Stylin'" – 4:04
4. "Free Your Mind" – 4:15 (Featuring Wee Papa Girl Rappers)
5. "Set The Pace (Say Yeah)" – 3:50
6. "Straight To The Dome" – 4:05
7. "Skinny Groove" – 2:08
8. "Get Pepped" – 4:01
9. "Cause We're Getting Ours" – 4:09 (Featuring Chuck Chillout)
10. "Stop Crying" – 4:22 (Featuring Flavor Flav)
11. "I Think It's Time" – 4:04
12. "On" – 4:04
13. "Every Kid's Dream" – 1:35

== In popular culture ==
The title track was featured in the 1993 films True Romance and Grumpy Old Men.
