= O.G. Style =

American rapper

- Origin: Houston, Texas, U.S.
- Genres: Hip hop
- Years active: 1989-1992
- Label: Rap-A-Lot Records
- Past members: Original E (deceased); DJ Boss (deceased)

O.G. Style (not to be confused with DJ Alejandro R. "O.G. Style" Martinez from Delinquent Habits) was an American hip hop duo from Houston, Texas. It was formed in 1989 by rapper Eric "Original E" Woods and his cousin, producer J. 'Big Boss' Brown. In 1991 the duo released their debut album I Know How To Play 'Em on Rap-a-Lot Records and enjoyed some moderate success with their 1990 single "Catch 'Em Slippin".

After the duo broke up in 1992, Eric Woods kept the name O.G. Style as a solo artist.

== Original E ==
O.G. Style
- Also known as: Prince Ezzy-E; (The) Original E; The E
- Born: Eric Woods; July 5, 1970
- Origin: Houston, Texas, U.S.
- Died: January 3, 2008 (aged 37)
- Genres: Dirty South hip hop
- Occupation: Rapper
- Years active: 1986–2008
- Labels: Rap-A-Lot Records; Zone Entertainment; Hard Edge Entertainment

=== Career ===
Eric Woods was born on July 5, 1970, in Texas. He began his career in 1986 as Prince Ezzy-E. He was a known local Houston celebrity due to his local college radio hits and his MC battles at area high school and block parties. In 1989, Woods changed his name to 'The Original E' (or just 'The E') after meeting and forming the O.G. Style duo with his cousin, DJ Boss.

However, after DJ Big Boss left the group, Woods continued to record as a solo artist under O.G. Style brand, and in 2001 he released the album I Still Know How To Play ‘Em!!! on Zone Entertainment, which featured Big Boss on one track. In 2004, Woods dropped Return Of Da Game via Hard Edge Entertainment.

=== Death ===
Woods was working on O.G. Style fourth album when, on January 2, 2008, he was rushed to St. Luke's Episcopal Hospital with a severe brain aneurysm. He died on January 3, 2008, from a brain hemorrhage at age of 37. Woods is survived by his estranged wife Shelley, including one child from their union, his remaining seven children, his father, and his three siblings. His son Eric plans to complete the album that Woods' left unfinished.

== DJ Big Boss ==
Big Boss parted ways with Eric Woods and left Rap-A-Lot Records to form another hip hop group called 4 Deep, which was consisted of rapper Chad 'Klass One' White, DJ Boss under his new alias as The Big Boss Man, and his brother Rodney 'Koo Rod' Brown. The trio released five full-length albums from 1993 to 1998. He also had some side projects such as Funky Products and Hyjnx during the years. Big Boss started his own record label called Power Move Music, and followed up with a solo album titled Respect Due in 2000.

Big Boss died of kidney failure in late 2006. In 2010, 4 Deep came back with their sixth and final studio album, Foreclosure!, released with posthumous audio production from Big Boss via Power Move Music.

== Discography ==
=== O.G. Style as a duo ===
- 1991: I Know How to Play 'Em

=== Eric Woods as O.G. Style ===
- 2001: I Still Know How To Play Em
- 2004: Return Of Da Game
