= Gangster Chronicle =

Studio album by London Posse
- Released: 1990
- Genre: British hip hop
- Length: 48:29
- Label: Wordplay

Professional ratings
Review scores
Source	Rating
Yahoo.com	(8/10)
rapreviews	(8.5/10)
NME	(6/10)
UKhh	(favourable)

Gangster Chronicle is the debut album by UK hip hop group London Posse. Sparkii (Jus Badd Cru) produced six of the tracks (as well as remixing and re-recording "Money Mad"), Twilight Firm (DJ Devastate and Brian B) produced two tracks and the London Posse produced "Tell Me Something". It was originally released as an LP on Mango Records in 1990, but was re-released in 2001 on Wordplay, and was re-released again in 2013 by Tru Thoughts Records as a double CD set. This features previously unreleased tracks and a selection of remixes. The album is regarded as a classic UK hip hop album.

== Original release track listing ==
1. "Money Mad (remix)" - 6:49
2. "Livin' Pancoot" (produced by Sparkii) - 6:24
3. "Original London Style" (produced by Sparkii) - 3:11
4. "Remedy for the Black Ash Blues" (produced by Sparkii) - 0:47
5. "Jump Around" (produced by Twilight Firm) - 6:11
6. "Sexy Gal" (produced by Twilight Firm) - 5:32
7. "Gangster Chronicle" (produced by Sparkii) - 3:49
8. "Live Like the Other Half Do" (produced by Sparkii) - 5:53
9. "Oversized Idiot" (produced by Sparkii) - 4:19
10. "Tell Me Something" (produced by London Posse) - 5:48
11. "Money Mad Bonus Beats" - 1:46

== 2001 reissue bonus tracks ==
1. "Jump Around (Censored Mix)" (produced by Nomad Soul) - 5:37
2. "How's Life in London?" (produced by Dobie) - 3:45
3. "Funky Rhyme, Funky Style" (produced by PD3) - 5:28
4. "Pass Me the Rizla" (produced by Kicks Like a Mule) - 5:14

== Singles ==
1. "Live Like the Other Half Do/Money Mad (Remix)" (Mango, 1989)
2. "Tell Me Something/Original London Style" (Mango, 1990)
3. "Jump Around (Nomad Soul)/Gangster Chronicle (remix)/Jump Around" (Mango, 1991)

== Samples ==
- "Pass Me the Rizla"
  - "Stoned Is the Way of the Walk" by Cypress Hill
- "Funky Rhyme, Funky Style"
  - "Different Strokes" by Syl Johnson
