= Force field =

Force field may refer to:

== Science ==
- Force field (chemistry), a computational model that is used to describe the forces between atoms (or collections of atoms) within molecules or between molecules as well as in crystals
- Force field (physics), a vector field corresponding with a non-contact force acting on a particle at various positions in space
- Force field (technology), a barrier produced by something like energy, negative energy, dark energy, electromagnetic fields, gravitational fields, electric fields, quantum fields, telekinetic fields, plasma, particles, radiation, solid light, magic, or pure force
- Force field, a region in the spinal cord that causes limbs to exert a consistent force depending on the limbs' position
- Force-field analysis, analysis that provides a framework for looking at the factors ("forces") that influence a situation, originally social situations

== Arts and entertainment ==
- Force Field (album), by the Atomic Bitchwax, 2017
- Forcefield (album), by Tokyo Police Club, 2014
- "Force Field", by Smash Mouth from Smash Mouth (album), 2001
- Forcefield (art collective), an American noise band and art collective
- Forcefield (band), a British hard rock band
- "Force Field", the theme tune of the British game show The Crystal Maze
