= Doug Lazy Gettin' Crazy =

Studio album by Doug Lazy
- Released: February 20, 1990
- Genres: Hip hop, house, hip house
- Label: Atlantic
- Producer: Doug Lazy

Doug Lazy Gettin' Crazy is the only album by the American hip hop musician Doug Lazy, released in 1990.

"Let the Rhythm Pump", "H.O.U.S.E.", and "Let It Roll" all reached No. 1 on the Billboard Hot Dance/Club Play chart. The album peaked at No. 65 on the UK Albums Chart.

== Production ==
The album was written and produced by Doug Lazy. It was made using just an Alesis MMT-8 sequencer and a Roland W-30.

== Critical reception ==
Professional ratings
Review scores
Source	Rating
AllMusic	3/5 stars
The Encyclopedia of Popular Music	3/5 stars
The Philadelphia Inquirer	2.5/4 stars
RapReviews	6/10
The Rolling Stone Album Guide	3/5 stars

Trouser Press wrote that "deep-bottom hip-house tracks—which owe something to the capital city's go-go scene—have plenty of get-up-and-groove, as does ol' Doug, once he gets up to the mic and commences to rhyming." The Washington Post deemed the album "10 relentless pumpers." Newsday declared that Lazy "combines furious house beats with simple, propulsive chants to create a landmark of hip house."

Comparing Lazy to Kool Moe Dee and M.C. Hammer, the Indianapolis Recorder wrote that "the club music makes his sound stand alone." The Baltimore Sun concluded that "there's enormous power to be had by combining" hip hop and house. The Philadelphia Inquirer stated that "Lazy is the hardest-working hip-houser in show business."

AllMusic called Doug Lazy Gettin' Crazy "a decent party album that has its share of catchy and infectious grooves." The Rolling Stone Album Guide wrote that Lazy's "approach to rhythm neatly blends hip-hop's raucous dynamism with the repetitious pulse of house music."

== Track listing ==
No.	Title	Length
1.	"Can't Hold Back (U No)"	4:24
2.	"Ahh Get It"	5:58
3.	"Let the Rhythm Pump"	4:15
4.	"Let It Roll"	5:40
5.	"Funky Beat"	4:28
6.	"Can't Get Enough"	4:39
7.	"Doug Lazy Gettin' Crazy"	4:28
8.	"U Really Wanna"	5:12
9.	"Go 2 Work"	5:18
10.	"H.O.U.S.E."	5:37
