= I Know How to Play 'Em =

I Know How To Play 'Em!

Studio album by O.G. Style
- Released: March 1991
- Recorded: 1989–1991
- Genre: Southern rap
- Length: 1:05:12
- Label: Rap-A-Lot Records
- Producer: Clifford Blodget (exec.); James H. Smith (exec.); DJ Big Boss

Singles from I Know How To Play 'Em!
- 1. "Catch 'Em Slippin'" Released: 1990

I Know How To Play 'Em! is the one and only album by American hip hop recording artists Eric 'Original E' Woods and DJ Big Boss, released as a duo O.G. Style from Houston, Texas. It was peaked at #69 on Billboard Top R&B/Hip-Hop Albums.

== Background and production ==
Professional ratings
Review scores
| Source | Rating |
|---|---|
| AllMusic | 2/5 stars |
| RapReviews | 7/10 stars |

O.G. Style's debut album I Know How To Play 'Em! was one of the Rap-A-Lot Records earliest full-lengths, which was dropped in 1991. It featured the single "Catch 'Em Slippin'", released in 1990.

Tony 'Big Chief' Randle and James Smith from American management company Jas Management, along with Rap-a-Lot's engineer Cliff Blodget served as executive producers and managers of the project. Audio production of the entire record was handled by DJ Big Boss and all the tracks were written and performed by Eric Woods.

== Track listing ==
| No. | Title | Length |
|---|---|---|
| 1. | "Intro" | 4:44 |
| 2. | "Sucker" | 5:27 |
| 3. | "Funky Payback" | 4:56 |
| 4. | "Catch 'Em Slippin" | 4:22 |
| 5. | "Playing It Cool" | 4:09 |
| 6. | "This Is How It Should Be Done" | 5:04 |
| 7. | "Knowledge Is The Gift" | 3:44 |
| 8. | "Free World" | 3:46 |
| 9. | "10 B 3" | 3:25 |
| 10. | "Kick The Ballistics" | 4:56 |
| 11. | "Listen To The Drum" | 3:15 |
| 12. | "Power" | 4:08 |
| 13. | "The "E"" | 6:23 |
| 14. | "Shout Outs" | 6:53 |
| 15. | "Aint We Funky" | 5:12 |
| Total length: | | 1:05:12 |

Samples

- "Intro" sampled "Funky Drummer" by James Brown (1970) and "Funk You Up" by The Sequence (1979)
- "Funky Payback" sampled "Mary Jane" by Rick James (1978)
- "Catch 'Em Slippin" sampled "Soulful Strut" by Young-Holt Unlimited (1968) and "Synthetic Substitution" by Melvin Bliss (1973)
- "This Is How It Should Be Done" sampled "I Know You Got Soul" by Eric B. & Rakim (1987)
- "10 B 3" sampled "UFO" by ESG (1981) and "Weak At The Knees" by Steve Arrington (1983)
- "Kick The Ballistics" sampled "Funky Drummer" by James Brown (1970) and "Kool Is Back" by Funk, Inc. (1971)
- "The 'E'" sampled "Pass The Peas" by The J.B.'s (1972)
- "Ain't We Funky" sampled "Just Kissed My Baby" by The Meters (1974)

== Personnel ==
- Cliff Blodget - executive producer
- Tony Randle - management
- James H. Smith - executive producer, management
- Eric Woods - main artist, rap vocals
- Big Boss - main artist, producer
