= Weightless (The Skinny Boys album) =

Studio album by The Skinny Boys
- Released: 1986
- Recorded: 1985–1986
- Genre: Hip hop
- Label: Warlock
- Producers: Mark Bush, Chuck Chillout

The Skinny Boys chronology
Weightless (1986)	Skinny & Proud (1987)

Weightless is the debut album by rap group the Skinny Boys. It was released in 1986 for Warlock Records and was produced by Mark Bush and Chuck Chillout. The opening track, "Jockbox," was used as the opening theme for the Comedy Central series Workaholics and also appeared in the show's series finale.

"Jockbox" was also sampled in a series of Wendy's commercials in September 2024.

== Track listing ==
1. "Jockbox" – 4:30
2. "Unity" – 4:50
3. "Get Funky" – 3:32
4. "Weightless" – 4:51
5. "Ill" – 3:10
6. "Feed Us The Beat" – 3:10
7. "Awesome" – 5:42
8. "Rip The Cut" – 2:48
9. "Skinny Boys" – 4:21
