= Gucci Crew II =

American hip hop group

The Gucci Crew II was a Miami bass group popular between 1980s and 1990s. The group was made up of MC V and TFS (a.k.a. 240 Shorty), along with Disco Rick, who was their DJ early on.

== Debut single: "Gucci Bass" ==
Their first song, "Gucci Bass", was inspired by LL Cool J's "Rock the Bells", and much like Gigolo Tony's 1986 hit, it utilized The Smurfs' theme song as the hook. The track was produced by Amos Larkins II in late 1986, making it a regional hit in early 1987.

== Debut album: So Def, So Fresh, So Stupid ==
As Larkins went into semi-retirement for a few years, Disco Rick assumed the role of producer. They released the album So Def, So Fresh, So Stupid in 1987, which became a hugely successful album locally on the heels of 2 Live Crew's debut album. The success was only heightened as the campy single, "Sally, That Girl", caught fire outside of Florida that same year, which over time proved to be their signature song.

== What Time is It? It's Gucci Time ==
In 1988, the trio released What Time is It? It's Gucci Time, and was quickly embraced by the emerging car audio bass market. Tensions arose as the final version of the album featured a parody of Doug E. Fresh's "La Di Da Di", which went against Disco Rick's wishes. As a result, Rick left the unit to form The Dogs, and Gucci Crew suddenly found themselves without a DJ and producer.

== Everybody Wants Some ==
As a duo, Gucci Crew began work on their third album, Everybody Wants Some in 1989, utilizing Hot Productions' in-house producer, Larry Davis. Davis had not only been a member of the highly successful disco-funk group Instant Funk, but had produced national hits for Gucci Crew's label mates L'Trimm the previous year, which led L'Trimm to a licensing deal with Atlantic Records. In a maximum effort promotional campaign, Hot Productions bought time for an interview on B.E.T.'s "Rap City" video show for both L'Trimm and Gucci Crew. Despite all the effort, Everybody Wants Some failed to impress Gucci Crew's core audience, and it also failed to attract new fans. Tensions between the group and the label came to a boil.

== G4 ==
The following year, Gucci Crew hired a new DJ and producer named Hollywood, and released their fourth and final album, G4. The initial single, "Pushin'", received airplay on Yo! MTV Raps, but again failed to gain attention. It was the group's next single, "Booty Shake", that became a club anthem in the south eastern United States in 1990/1991 and gained the act a whole new fanbase for a brief period.

== The final days ==
By the end of 1991, the Miami bass scene went through a complete makeover. 2 Live Crew had officially announced their breakup, sample clearance issues halted productions for many groups, and a couple of breakthrough hits had changed the focus of the music to higher tempos for "booty shake" contests. It took until 1994 for any new material to come out under the Gucci Crew moniker. The two singles, "Erase Ya Face" and "Spikin' The Funky Punch", did not meet the new standards for the Miami bass scene. Although the act now only featured 240 Shorty and the singles failed to gain any substantial attention, Gucci Crew II continued to conduct underground birthday parties for young children under the moniker "Goofy Crew II". The label closed out Gucci Crew's contract by funding no new productions, maximizing their existing catalog by releasing a greatest hits compilation later that year.

In December 2007, MC V (Victor May) was shot 6 times in the back and killed in Americus, Georgia. He was buried in Ocala, Florida. Disco Rick was the only former Gucci Crew II member that attended his funeral.
