= The Dogs (album) =

Studio album by The Dogs
- Released: March 28, 1990
- Recorded: 1989–1990
- Genres: Miami bass; dirty rap
- Label: JR Records
- Producers: Calvin Mills II; Disco Rick (co.)

The Dogs chronology
The Dogs (1990)	Beware of The Dogs (1991)

Singles from The Dogs
- 1. "Take It Off" Released: November 21, 1989

Professional ratings
Review scores
Source	Rating
AllMusic	3/5 stars
RapReviews	4/10

The Dogs is the self-titled debut album by American hip hop group The Dogs. It was released on March 28, 1990, through JR Records with distribution via Joey Boy Records. Engineering and mixing sessions took place at HN Studios in Miami. Production was handled by Calvin Mills II with Disco Rick serving as co-producer. The album found mild success, peaking at number 37 on the US Top R&B/Hip-Hop Albums chart and featured the group's most well known song "Crack Rock".

== Track listing ==
All tracks are written by Rick Taylor and Calvin Mills II.

No.	Title	Length
1.	"Intro"	0:50
2.	"Where Is Disco Rick At?"	3:20
3.	"Lets Go, Lets Go"	3:26
4.	"Fuck the President"	3:29
5.	"Ten Little Niggers"	4:31
6.	"Lick It"	3:40
7.	"Take It Baby"	4:07
8.	"Dog Call"	4:47
9.	"Take It Off"	4:10
10.	"Crack Rock"	4:19
11.	"Who Gives a Fuck"	3:23
12.	"Get Loose"	4:34
13.	"Fuck You All"	2:10

== Personnel ==
- Ricky "Disco Rick" Taylor – songwriter, arrangement, co-producer
- DJ F.M. – scratches
- Calvin Mills II – songwriter, arrangement, producer, engineering, mixing
- Carlos Santos – engineering, mixing
- Allen L. Johnston – executive producer
- Jose Armada Jr. – executive producer
- Jose A. Barcena – artwork
- Albelo Graphics, Inc. – artwork

== Charts ==
Chart (1990)	Peak position
US Top R&B/Hip-Hop Albums (Billboard)	37
