= Lyrical King (From the Boogie Down Bronx) =

Studio album by T La Rock
- Released: 1987
- Recorded: 1986–1987
- Genre: Hip-hop
- Length: 42:26
- Labels: Fresh/Sleeping Bag Records (U.S.); LPRE-2 Ten/Virgin Records (UK)
- Producers: T La Rock; Louie Lou; Kurtis Mantronik

T La Rock chronology
Lyrical King (From the Boogie Down Bronx) (1987)	On a Warpath (1989)

Lyrical King (From the Boogie Down Bronx), from 1987, is the debut album of hip-hop emcee T La Rock. It was released after the EP He's Incredible, and none of the tracks from that record were on the original release of the album. Singles released were "Back to Burn," "Tudy Fruity Judy," "It's Time to Chill," and, in the UK, "Big Beat in London." Kurtis Mantronik produced several tracks, and Greg Nice of Nice & Smooth contributed human beat boxing. When the album was rereleased in digital form by Traffic Entertainment Group in 2006, two of the tracks from He's Incredible and two non-album tracks produced by Kurtis Mantronik were added. In addition, the Rick Rubin-produced classic "It's Yours," which was originally released on a different label, was also included because of its common ownership in the present day.

== Cover ==
On the cover can be seen T La Rock wearing an Adidas Laser track top with the logo of the French Football Federation. Actually, T La Rock won this suit from a streetball game against Akhenaton, one of the emcees of the French hip hop group IAM, when the group came to New York City in 1986.

== Track listing ==
Original 1987 album:

1. Lyrical King
2. Back to Burn
3. Tudy Fruity Judy
4. Having Fun
5. Three Minutes of Beat Box
6. Bust These Lyrics
7. This Beat Kicks
8. Big Beat in London
9. It's Time to Chill
10. Live Drummin' with the Country Boy

2006 additions:

1. It's Yours (12-Inch Radio Mix)
2. Breakdown (12-Inch Version)
3. He's Incredible (12-Inch Version)
4. Breaking Bells (12-Inch Version)
5. Bass Machine (12-Inch Version)

== Additional personnel ==
- Editors: Chep Nuñez, Omar Santana, Carlos Barios
- Mastering engineer: Howie Weinberg

== Later samples ==
Samples of "It's Yours" can be heard in the following songs and in countless others.

- "Paul Revere" by the Beastie Boys from the album Licensed to Ill
- "Louder Than a Bomb" by Public Enemy from the album It Takes a Nation of Millions to Hold Us Back
- "The World Is Yours" by Nas from the album Illmatic
- "Rewind" by Nas from the album Stillmatic
- "Fumbling Over Words That Rhyme" by Edan from the album Beauty and the Beat
- "Party People" and "Can You Party" by Royal House from its self-titled album
- "Interloper" by Slipknot from the album Slipknot
