= London Posse =

British hip hop group

- Origin: London, England
- Genres: British hip hop
- Years active: 1986–1996
- Labels: Justice, Big Life, Mango, Bullitt
- Past members: Rodney P Bionic; DJ Biznizz; Sipho the Human Beatbox

London Posse was a British hip hop group. According to The Daily Telegraph, they "finally gave British rap an identity of its own." London Posse member Bionic led the charge for UK and worldwide artists to use their own accents and languages rather than copy Americans and was the architect behind their biggest hit "Money Mad" introducing 'road style' to UK hip hop and mixing it with ragga/dancehall.

== Formation ==
The group was formed by Sipho the Human Beatbox, and consisted of Sipho, Rodney P, Bionic and DJ Biznizz. Sipho had gained the attention of Mick Jones (formerly of The Clash) through his performance in the 1985 documentary Electrorock, and had subsequently performed on Big Audio Dynamite's track "C'Mon Every Beatbox" from the album No. 10, Upping St.. The group formed for the 1986 Big Audio Dynamite tour of the United States and Europe, as Sipho had been asked to tour and wanted the others to tour with him. Rodney P (then known as MC Rodie Rok) was two weeks into a YTS course when he joined the group and Bionic was performing as a reggae MC, although Rodney and Bionic already knew each other through mutual acquaintances and through attending Jerry Dammers's Artist Against Apartheid gigs in Covent Garden. As well as this, Sipho and Bionic had already been performing together – they had featured on the Irish TV show Megamix in 1986 as a duo. Also supporting on the tour were Schoolly D and DJ Code Money.

When the group first formed, it did not have a name, but while playing in New York City, they were constantly referred to as the "London Posse" because of their hometown, and the name stuck. While out in New York, they were present at the filming of the Boogie Down Productions video for "The Bridge Is Over". On their return to the UK, they released the single "London Posse" (Big Life, 1987), produced by Tim Westwood, which detailed their experiences. The single peaked at number eleven on the UK Independent Chart, staying in the chart for eleven weeks. The b-side, "My Beatbox Reggae Style", was Sipho beatboxing and Bionic rapping, with scratches from Biznizz. This was the first UK track to consist solely of a beatboxer providing the backing. The group also appeared in Tim Westwood's 1987 BBC documentary Bad Meaning Good, a look at UK hip hop culture featuring London Posse, Cookie Crew, MC Crazy Noddy and DJ Fingers, and others. After the first single, Sipho and Biznizz officially left the group – Sipho to work with Derek B, and Biznizz to work on Tim Westwood's radio show (although Biznizz continued to work with the group as a DJ and produce some of the group's later tracks).

Rodney P and Bionic continued to record as a duo, releasing the single "Money Mad" (Justice, 1988) with Westwood's Justice label, which gained a great deal of radio exposure. Westwood, however, did not feel that he could continue to run a label, and the duo moved to Island Records subsidiary Mango. As well as appearing on the anti-apartheid B.R.O.T.H.E.R. track "Beyond The 16th Parallel" alongside Demon Boyz, MC Mell'O, Cookie Crew, She Rockers, London Rhyme Syndicate, Katch-22, Gunshot, Hijack, Icepick and Overlord X, they released "Live Like The Other Half Do" in 1989. Their classic (and only officially released) album, Gangster Chronicle (Mango Records) was released the following year. Produced primarily by Sparki (a member of the Jus Badd Crew, along with MC Mell'O and Monie Love), DJ Devastate and the Posse themselves, it had its roots firmly in reggae and hip hop, and the album sounded quite different from the predominant hardcore of their contemporaries, and cemented London Posse's reputation as one of the UK scene's most talented groups. According to the NME, on its release it was "a musical Molotov cocktail". They also toured during this time with Public Enemy and N.W.A, along with Demon Boyz and MC Mell'O'.

After two more singles ("Tell Me Something" and "Jump Around"), Mango was closed down by its parent company and the London Posse moved to Bullitt Records, run by their manager Errol Bull (who features on both "How's Life in London" and the Ragga remix). The group began recording a second album (preliminary titled Ladies Love Roughnecks) but could not afford to release it with the financial responsibilities of running a label, so it was permanently shelved. Instead, they released a selection of singles and guest spots with other artists.

1993 saw several tracks released as singles: "How's Life in London" / "Shut the Fuck Up" / "How I Make Papes" (Bullit), the "How's Life in London Bogle remix", produced by Dobie and Tony Gadd (of Aswad), "Supermodel / Here Comes The Rugged One" (Bullit) (produced by DJ Devastate), and the Kicks Like a Mule produced "Pass Me The Rizla" (on the Ruffness: The British Underground EP). The following year saw "Funky Rhyme Funky Style", released with PD3. The group separated in 1995, and started moving in different circles to each other. Bionic teamed up with Stevie Hyper D and ventured into drum and bass MCing while Rodney P stayed with hip hop. Both MCs recorded independently to one another: Bionic released a double A side D+B 12" produced by Peter Parsons (aka Voyager); one side was a remix of "Live Life The Other Half Do" and the other was "Feds", a solo track. Rodney was asked by producer Dobie to guest on a remix of the Björk track "I Miss You"; following this Rodney and Dobie collaborated again on Dobie's release "Love and Hate (Can Never Be Friends)".

London Posse reformed briefly in 1996, and their final release was "Style" (Bullit), a drum and bass influenced track produced by Bionic which also featured a remix by The Nextmen (the Nextmen's first official remix).

After the group disbanded, Bionic moved fully into drum and bass MCing and worked closely with Stevie Hyper D before Stevie's death in 1998. He then recorded with Tricky on the Juxtapose album (1999) under the name "Mad Dog" and also contributed to Tricky's 2000 EP Mission Accomplished.

Rodney P formed a long-standing partnership with DJ Skitz to host a BBC Radio 1Xtra show and released a solo album – The Future – in 2004. (An unreleased 2002 version of the album featured a track called "Hip Hop Gangster", featuring Sipho on beatbox). He has also worked with the Dub Pistols, the Nextmen, Freq Nasty, Skinnyman, Roots Manuva and Roni Size.

In 2001, Word Play Records reissued the album Gangster Chronicle, adding some (but not all) of the later material such as "How's Life in London" and "Pass the Rizla". A double CD reissue of this album featuring previously unreleased recordings and contemporary remixes was scheduled for June 2013.

Sipho died in 2004.

== Discography ==
=== Albums ===
- Gangster Chronicle (1990, Mango Records)

=== Singles ===
- "London Posse" / "My Beatbox Reggae Style" (1987, Big Life) – UK Indie No. 11
- "Money Mad" (1988, Justice)
- "Live Like the Other Half Do" / "Money Mad (Remix)" (1989, Mango)
- "Tell Me Something" / "Original London Style" (1990, Mango)
- "Jump Around (Nomad Soul)" / "Gangster Chronicle Remix" / "Jump Around" (1991, Mango)
- "How's Life in London" / "How I Make Papes" / "Shut the Fuck Up" (1993, Bullitt)
- "How's Life in London (Ragga Mix)" (1993, Bullitt)
- "Supermodel" / "Here Comes the Rugged One" (1993, Bullitt)
- "Live Like the Other Half Do (Remix)" / "Feds" (credited to 'Jungle'; 1995, Bullitt)
- "Style" / "Style (Next Men Remix)" (1996, Bullitt)

=== Guest appearances ===
- "Pass the Rizla" (Ruffness: The British Underground EP) (XL, 1993)
- "Funky Rhyme, Funky Style" (PD3 featuring London Posse) (from the Noisy Music EP) (Payday, 1994)
