= Comin' Correct in 88 =

Studio album by MC Shy D
- Released: July 13, 1988
- Recorded: 1988
- Genre: Hip hop
- Length: 36:00
- Label: Luke
- Producer: Luke; MC Shy D; DJ Toomp; DJ Mike Fresh; Michael Sterling (co.)>

MC Shy D chronology
Got to Be Tough (1987)	Comin' Correct in 88 (1988)	Don't Sweat Me (1990)

Professional ratings
Review scores
Source	Rating
AllMusic	3/5 stars

Comin' Correct in 88 is the second studio album by American rapper and producer MC Shy D. It was released on July 13, 1988 via Luke Skyywalker Records, his final effort on the label. The album peaked at number 35 on the Top R&B Albums chart in the US.

== Track listing ==
Comin' Correct in 88 track listing
No.	Title	Length
1.	"I Am Rough"	3:48
2.	"It's Just My Caddy"	3:45
3.	"I Don't Want to Treat You Wrong"	4:31
4.	"I Don't Play"	3:42
5.	"Will Go Off (Part II)"	3:44
6.	"Atlanta That's Where I Stay"	4:14
7.	"Shake It"	5:23
8.	"I Wanna Dance"	4:03
9.	"Tearin' it Up"	3:23
Total length:		36:00

== Personnel ==
- Peter T. Jones – main artist, vocals, producer, arranging
- Aldrin Davis – scratches, producer
- Mike Fresh McCray – scratches, lead producer
- Michael Dennis Johnson – mixing, recording, co-producer
- Luther Campbell – executive producer
- Manny Morell – design
- Ed Robinson – photography

== Charts ==
Chart performance for Comin' Correct in 88
Chart (1988)	Peak position
US Top R&B/Hip-Hop Albums (Billboard)	35
