= Survival of the Freshest =

Studio album by the Boogie Boys
- Released: March 31, 1986
- Genre: Golden age hip-hop
- Length: 38:29
- Label: Capitol
- Producer: Ted Currier

The Boogie Boys chronology
City Life (1985)	Survival of the Freshest (1986)	Romeo Knight (1988)

Professional ratings
Review scores
Source	Rating
AllMusic	2/5 stars

Survival of the Freshest is the second studio album by American hip-hop group the Boogie Boys, which was released on March 31, 1986 by Capitol Records. The album peaked at #124 on the Billboard 200 and spent nine weeks on the charts. The album had two charting hits, "Girl Talk" and "Share My World."

== Track listing ==
1. "Dealin' with Life" – 5:02
2. "Girl Talk" – 4:37
3. "Starvin' Marvin" – 3:58
4. "Share My World" – 5:13
5. "Run It" - 4:12
6. "Friend or Foe" – 5:14
7. "Love List" – 4:55
8. "Colorblind World" – 5:18

== Samples ==
Run It

- "Hang It Up" by Patrice Rushen

Dealin' with Life

- "Superappin'" by Grandmaster Flash and the Furious Five

== Personnel ==
- William "Boogie Knight" Stroman – vocals
- Joe "Romeo J.D." Malloy – vocals
- Rudy "Lil' Rahiem" Sheriff – vocals
- Garry Shider – background vocal arrangement, background bocals
- Audrey Wheeler – backing vocals
- Bruce Shider – backing vocals
- Cindy Mizelle – backing vocals
- Craig Stanton – backing vocals
- David Sanchez – backing vocals
- Kevin Shider – backing vocals
- Mallia Franklin – backing vocals
- Michael Murry – backing vocals
- Nate Shider – backing vocals
- Nowell Haskins – backing vocals
- Ron Ford – backing vocals
- Tim Shider – backing vocals
- Tony Terry – backing vocals
- Gary Henry – keyboards
- Cherrie Shepherd – executive producer
- Ted Currier – producer
- John Harris, Steve Peck – engineer
