= Romeo Knight =

Studio album by Boogie Boys
- Released: 1988
- Genre: Hip-hop
- Length: 45:47
- Label: Capitol Records
- Producer: Ted Currier

Boogie Boys chronology
Survival of the Freshest (1986)	Romeo Knight (1988)

Professional ratings
Review scores
Source	Rating
Allmusic	2/5 stars
Philadelphia Inquirer	3/4 stars

Romeo Knight is the third and final album by American rap group Boogie Boys, released in 1988 on Capitol Records. Following the departure of Rudy "Lil' Rahiem" Sheriff, the remaining Boogie Boys (William "Boogie Knight" Stroma and Joe "Romeo J.D." Malloy) headed into the studio to create Romeo Knight.

== Track listing ==
1. This Is Us (4:26)
2. Kick It (4:18)
3. Pit Bull (3:27)
4. Body (3:24)
5. Peep It (3:25)
6. Romeo Knight (4:22)
7. I'm Comin' (3:38)
8. I'm a Lover (3:25)
9. Home Girl (3:36)
10. Pussi Cat (3:09)
11. Always on My Mind (5:21)
12. Rise Up (3:16)

== Artwork ==
The cover was created by PHASE 2, a popular graffiti artist in New York. "Boogie Knight hooked that up," Malloy said in an interview, "as a matter of fact. That was crazy, we had a whole Egyptian thing going on with the pyramids and being born on January 13th, 1964 - Phase dug deep on that. Me and Boogie always talked about old R&B who had album covers we used to love, like Earth, Wind & Fire. So yeah, that cover was crazy."
