= Kings of the West Coast =

Studio album by LA Dream Team
- Released: September 2, 1986
- Recorded: 1985–86; (Los Angeles)
- Genre: West Coast hip hop, hip hop, electro music
- Length: 68:16
- Label: Dream Team Records, Geffen Records, MCA Records; 0 76732-5779-1 2 MCA-5779 (original release); MCF 3345; MCA-5779; 254 255-1; MCF 3345 (W/Lbl)
- Producer: Rudy Pardee (also exec.), Snake Puppy, The Real Richie Rich, Courtney Branch, Tracy Kendrick

LA Dream Team chronology
Kings of the West Coast (1986)	Back to the Bone (1986)

Singles from Kings of the West Coast
- 1. "The Dream Team Is in the House" Released: 1985; 2. "Nursery Rhymes" Released: 1986; 3. "You're Just Too Young" Released: 1986; 4. "Hollywood Boulevard" Released: 1986; 5. "Rockberry Jam" Released: 1986; 6. "Calling On the Dream Team" Released: 1986

Kings of the West Coast is the debut studio album by LA Dream Team. It contains their best-known singles, "The Dream Team Is in the House" and "Nursery Rhymes". Kings of the West Coast was their only album to chart on the Billboard 200.

== Critical reception ==
Professional ratings
Review scores
Source	Rating
AllMusic	3/5 stars

Ron Wynn of AllMusic said, "Rudy Pardee and Chris Wilson didn't become kings or even princes of the West Coast. They came a lot closer to enjoying court jester status, as their 1986 debut contained only one mildly entertaining number, 'Dream Team Is in the House'."

== Track listing ==
No.	Title	Producer(s)	Length
1.	"Kings of the West Coast"	L.A. Dream Team	2:52
2.	"The Dream Team Is in the House"	Courtney Branch, Tracy Kendrick	5:13
3.	"Nursery Rhymes"	The Real Richie Rich	3:41
4.	"You're Just Too Young"		5:19
5.	"Hollywood Boulevard"	Steve Dorff, The Waters, Tavi Mote, Louil Sillas, Jr.	4:59
6.	"And the Orchestra Plays"		4:02
7.	"Rockberry Jam"		5:14
8.	"Calling On the Dream Team"	Dennis Parker	4:32

== Personnel ==
- Jeff Adamoff – Art Direction
- The Real Richie Rich – Producer, Keyboards
- Courtney Branch – Producer, Engineer, mixing
- Tracy Kendrick – Producer, Engineer, mixing
- Ron Larson – Design
- Chris "Snake Puppy" Wilson – Lead Vocals, Drum Machine (Devastating High Velocity Beats)
- Michael Perison – Keyboards
- Rudy Pardee – Lead Vocals
- Aaron Rappoport – Photography
- L.A. Dream Team – Producer
- Bert "Mellow-B" Lopez – Keyboard Computer Programmer
- Christlynn Saulsbury – Female Vocals
- Diana Cacho – Female Vocals
- Kim Boyd – Female Vocals
- Shenitha Thomas – Female Vocals
- Lisette "Lisa Love" Rodriguez – Sexy Female Vocal

== Charts ==
Year	Album	Chart positions	
Year	Album	Billboard 200	Top R&B/Hip Hop Albums
1986	Kings of the West Coast	138	138
