= Street Sounds Hip Hop Electro 16 =

Compilation album by various artists
- Released: 1987
- Genre: Electro music, old school hip hop
- Label: StreetSounds

Street Sounds Hip Hop Electro 16 is the sixteenth compilation album in a series and was released 1987 on the StreetSounds label. The album was released on LP and cassette and contains nine electro music and old school hip hop tracks mixed by Herbie Laidley.

== Track listing ==
Side one
No.	Title	Artist	Length
1.	"Cabbage Patch"	World Class Wreckin' Cru	-:--
2.	"New Generation"	The Classical Two	-:--
3.	"Paybacks A Mutha"	King Tee with D.J. Keith Cooley	-:--
4.	"Cold Gettin' Dumb II (Remix)"	Just-Ice	-:--

Side two
No.	Title	Artist	Length
1.	"Travelling At The Speed Of Thought"	Ultramagnetic M.C.'s	-:--
2.	"Rap Will Never Die (Part II)"	M.C. Shy-D	-:--
3.	"2 Live Is What We Are"	2 Live Crew	-:--
4.	"He Cuts So Fresh"	Marley Marl	-:--
5.	"Pleasure Seekers"	Faze One	-:--
