= Skinny & Proud =

Studio album by The Skinny Boys
- Released: October 17, 1987
- Recorded: 1986/1987
- Genre: Hip hop
- Label: Jive Records, RCA Records
- Producer: Dj Superman jay, Shocking Shaun and the human Jock box

The Skinny Boys chronology
Weightless (1986)	Skinny & Proud (1987)	Skinny (They Can't Get Enough) (1988)

Professional ratings
Review scores
Source	Rating
New Musical Express	4/10

Skinny & Proud is the second album by rap group, The Skinny Boys. It was released on October 17, 1987 for Jive Records, distributed by RCA Records and was produced by Mark Bush and Chuck Chillout.

== Track listing ==
1. "Skinny And Proud"
2. "I Wanna Be Like"
3. "Rip The Cut, Part 2"
4. "Cries Of The City"
5. "Cool Johnny"
6. "Something From The Past"
7. "This Record Is Hell"
8. "I Won't Stop"
9. "Poison This Place"
