= Street Sounds Hip Hop Electro 13 =

Compilation album by various artists
- Released: 1986
- Genre: Electro music, old school hip hop
- Label: StreetSounds

Street Sounds Hip Hop Electro 13 is the thirteenth compilation album in a series and was released 1986 on the StreetSounds label. The album was released on LP and cassette and contains twenty-one electro music and old school hip hop tracks mixed by Herbie Laidley.

== Track listing ==
Side one
No.	Title	Artist	Length
1.	"Style (Peter Gunn Theme)"	Grandmaster Flash	-:--
2.	"Bambaataa's Theme (Assault On Precinct 13)"	Afrika Bambaataa and Family	-:--
3.	"UK Fresh '86 (The Anthem)"	Hashim	-:--
4.	"Fast Life"	Dr. Jeckyll & Mr. Hyde	-:--
5.	"Get Loose"	Aleem	-:--
6.	"(Solution To) The Problem (The DEFinitive Dance Mix)"	Masquerade	-:--
7.	"Square Dance Rap (Power Mix)"	Sir Mix-A-Lot	-:--
8.	"Return Of Captain Rock"	Captain Rock	-:--
9.	"Running ("The Nest" Remix)"	Information Society	-:--
10.	"Mission Possible"	World Class Wreckin' Cru	-:--

Side two
No.	Title	Artist	Length
1.	"Amityville"	Lovebug Starski	-:--
2.	"Pee-Wee's Dance"	Joe Ski Love	-:--
3.	"Latoya"	Just-Ice	-:--
4.	"The Prophecy, Part 1 (In The Beginning)"	M.C. Chill	-:--
5.	"Eric B. Is President"	Eric B. featuring Rakim	-:--
6.	"Bring The Beat Back (Vocal)"	M.C. Boob A.K.A. Steady "B"	-:--
7.	"(Bang Zoom) Let's Go Go Go"	The Real Roxanne with Hitman Howie Tee	-:--
8.	"Queen Of Rox (Shante Rox On) (Street Version)"	Roxanne Shanté	-:--
9.	"The State We're In (Vocal)"	Easy Mike featuring M.C. Sure Shot	-:--
10.	"Ladies"	Mantronix	-:--
11.	"Sleep Walking"	Family Quest	-:--
