= Street Sounds Hip Hop Electro 12 =

Compilation album by various artists
- Released: 1986
- Genre: Electro music, old school hip hop
- Label: StreetSounds

Street Sounds Hip Hop Electro 12 is the twelfth compilation album in a series and was released 1986 on the StreetSounds label. The album was released on LP and cassette and contains eight electro music and old school hip hop tracks mixed by Herbie Laidley.

== Track listing ==
Side one
No.	Title	Artist	Length
1.	"Fastest Man Alive"	Grandmaster Flash	-:--
2.	"Beat Box Is Rocking"	Fat Boys	-:--
3.	"Square Dance Rap (Rodeo Drive Mix)"	Sir Mix-A-Lot	-:--
4.	"Trow The D. And Ghetto Bass"	Ghetto Style With 2 Live Crew	-:--

Side two
No.	Title	Artist	Length
1.	"Ultimate III Live!"	Ultimate III	-:--
2.	"MC Story"	MC Chill	-:--
3.	"Girls (Rulin' The World)"	Celebrity Club featuring Royal Silk	-:--
4.	"Funky Beat"	Whodini	-:--
