= Gotta Get a Grip (album) =

Studio album by MC Trouble
- Released: June 12, 1990
- Recorded: 1989–1990
- Genre: Hip hop
- Length: 40:27
- Label: Motown Records
- Producer: MC Trouble, LA Jay

Professional ratings
Review scores
Source	Rating
Allmusic	3/5 stars

Gotta Get a Grip is the only studio album released by American rapper MC Trouble. It was released on June 12, 1990 through Motown Records and featured production by MC Trouble herself and LA Jay. The album reached No. 94 on the Billboard Top R&B Albums chart selling 182,000 units and spawned two singles, "Gotta Get a Grip" and "(I Wanna) Make You Mine". Less than a year after the album was released, MC Trouble died of a seizure.

== Track listing ==
1. "(I Wanna) Make You Mine" (John Barnes III) – 4:03 (Featuring The Good Girls)
2. "The Push Up" (Johnny Rogers, Stan Jones) – 3:52
3. "Gotta Get a Grip" (Johnny Rivers) – 3:39
4. "Fly Guy" (Stan Jones, Tony Holmes) – 4:22
5. "Black Line" (Dominic Aldridge) – 4:22
6. "Here Comes Trouble" (Johnny Rivers) – 4:04
7. "Power Move" (Stan Jones) – 3:44
8. "Thing For You" (Johnny Rogers, Stephanie Pinkard) – 4:46
9. "Points Proven" (Bob Khaleel, Johnny Rivers) – 4:01
10. "Well Equipped" (Johnny Rivers) – 3:34
11. "Is It Live" (Stan Jones) - Bonus track
12. "Body" (Johnny Rivers) - Bonus track
