= The Dogs (American hip-hop group) =

American hip hop group

- Origin: Miami, Florida, U.S.
- Genres: Hip-hop, Miami bass, dirty rap
- Years active: 1989–1996
- Labels: Joey Boy Records
- Past members: Disco Rick; Keith Bell; Labrant Dennis; Cracked Up

The Dogs were a 1990s hip hop group consisting of Disco Rick, Keith Bell, Labrant Dennis, and Fergus "Cracked Up" Smith, best known for "Crack Rock," their hit single with the chant "Yo' Mama's on Crack Rock!" The group released three studio albums The Dogs in 1990, Beware of the Dogs in 1991 and K-9 Bass in 1992.

The group officially disbanded in 1996 when Labrant Dennis was arrested for the murder of his ex-girlfriend, Timwanika Lumpkins, and her friend Marlin Barnes, a linebacker for the University of Miami football team. Dennis was convicted of the double-murders in 1998, and sentenced to death in 1999. His death sentence was reversed by the Florida Supreme Court in 2020.

== Discography ==
=== Albums ===
| Year | Album | Chart Position |
| Year | Album | US Hip-Hop |
|---|---|---|
| 1990 | The Dogs | 37 |
| 1991 | Beware of the Dogs | 55 |
| 1992 | K-9 Bass | 95 |
