= MC Shy D =

- Also known as: Shy D; M.C. Shy-D
- Born: Peter T. Jones; The Bronx, New York City, U.S.
- Origin: Atlanta, Georgia, U.S.
- Genres: Hip hop; Miami bass
- Occupations: Rapper; producer
- Years active: 1986–2000s
- Labels: Luke Skyywalker Records; Benz Records; On Top Records; Wrap Records

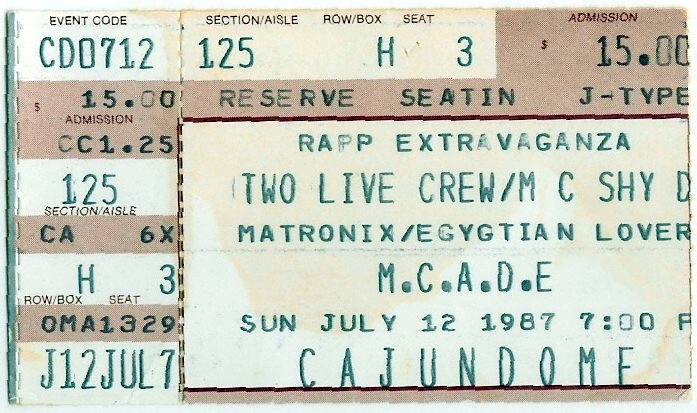
A concert ticket from a 1987 MC Shy D performance in Louisiana.

Peter Jones, professionally known by his stage name MC Shy D, is an American rapper and producer originally from the Bronx, New York, but was based in Atlanta, Georgia and thus became known as one of the first rappers to come from there. He was signed with Luke Skyywalker Records and released two albums, Got to Be Tough and Comin' Correct in 88, through the label from 1987 to 1988. He released his third album, Don't Sweat Me, in 1990 via On Top Records and Benz Records, and his fourth album, The Comeback, in 1993 via Wrap Records. In 1996, Jones released his fifth studio album, Recordnize, featuring DJ Smurf under Benz Records. His sixth and most recent album, Against the Odds, was released in 1999 with Charlotte 'Tha Rhythum' Crooms, also via Benz Records.

He is a cousin of Afrika Bambaataa.

M.C. Shy D was awarded $1.6 million in past royalties and punitive damages from fellow rapper and record producer Luther Campbell. M.C. Shy D said Campbell owed him from Gotta Be Tough and Comin' Correct in '88, two albums he recorded under Campbell's record label, Luke Records, in the late 1980s.

== Discography ==
Studio albums

Year	Title	Chart positions	
Year	Title	Billboard 200	Top R&B/Hip-Hop Albums
1987	Got to Be Tough: Released: August 12, 1987; Label: Luke Skyywalker Records	197	41
1988	Comin' Correct in 88: Released: July 13, 1988; Label: Luke Skyywalker Records	—	35
1990	Don't Sweat Me: Label: Benz Records/On Top Records	—	80
1993	The Comeback: Label: Wrap Records	—	—
1996	Recordnize (with DJ Smurf): Label: Benz Records	—	—
1999	Against The Odds (with Tha Rhythum): Label: Benz Records	—	—
