= Kyper =

American rapper

- Born: Randall S. Kiper; Baton Rouge, Louisiana, U.S.
- Genres: Hip-hop
- Occupation: Rapper
- Instrument: Vocals
- Years active: 1987–1995
- Labels: Traction, Atlantic

Randall S. Kiper, more known as Kyper, is an American rapper, D.J. and actor based in Baton Rouge, Louisiana, United States. His success occurred in the early 1990s with a string of club hits including "Conceited", "What Gets Your Body Hyped (XTC)", "Tic-Tac-Toe", "Throw Down", and "Spin the Bottle". His biggest hit to date is "Tic-Tac-Toe," which sold over a million copies. It hit No.16 on the Cash Box Top 100 and No. 14 on the Billboard Hot 100. It was ranked No. 100 on the Billboard Year-End Hot 100 singles of 1990. The track sampled instrumental passages from "Owner of a Lonely Heart" by Yes. It also sampled "Planet Rock" by Afrika Bambaataa and Soul Sonic Force among others.

== Albums ==
Year	Album	U.S. 200	R&B/Hip-Hop
1987	Conceited; Label: Traction	-	-
1990	Tic-Tac-Toe; Label: Atlantic	82	79
1992	Countdown To The Year 2000; Label: Atlantic	-	-
1995	Livin-N-XTC; Label: Atlantic	-	-

== Singles ==
Year	Song	US BB	US CB	US Dance	US Rap
1987	"Conceited"	-	-	-	-
1988	"Life Is Hard"	-	-	-	-
1988	"Throw Down"	-	-	-	-
1989	"What Gets Your Body Hyped (XTC)"	-	-	-	-
1990	"Tic-Tac-Toe"	14	16	8	10
1990	"What Is The World Coming To (Dear God)"	-	-	-	-
1992	"Spin The Bottle"	-	-	-	-
1993	"Back In Black"	-	-	-	-
1993	"His Name Is Kyper (And He Is Hyper)" (with [BFTS])	-	-	-	-
