= Doin' Damage =

Studio album by JVC Force
- Released: 1988
- Genre: Hip-hop
- Label: B-Boy Records

JVC Force chronology
Doin' Damage (1988)	Force Field (1990)

Singles from Doin' Damage
- 1. "Strong Island" Released: 1987; 2. "Love Line / Stylin' Lyrics" Released: April 21, 1987; 3. "Take It Away" Released: April 19, 1988

Doin' Damage is the debut LP by American hip-hop group JVC Force, released in 1988 through B-Boy Records. The album includes the song "Strong Island", one of the group's best-known recordings. The group consisted of MC's AJ Rok and B-Luv and DJ Curt Cazal.

== Reception ==
=== Contemporary ===
In its September 24, 1988, issue, Cash Box reviewed Doin' Damage in its "independent way" column. The review characterized JVC Force's approach as informal and humorous, highlighting the variety of vocal styles on the album. It also praised the range of its samples and beats, and described B-Boy Records as a promising independent label in the contemporary rap scene.

=== Retrospective ===
In a 2008 review for RapReviews, Steve "Flash" Juon gave the album a score of 7.5 out of 10. He praised the chemistry between the group's members and the album's sampling and production, while noting that some of its rhymes could sound simplistic to modern listeners. Juon also discussed the later reissue of the album by Traffic Entertainment Group in 2005.

== Track listing ==
Side	No.	Title
A	1	"Strong Island"
A	2	"Doin' Damage"
A	3	"Take It Away"
A	4	"The Force Is the Boss"
A	5	"Nu Skool"
B	6	"You'll Like It Too"
B	7	"Stylin' Lyrics"
B	8	"Puppy Love"
B	9	"The Force Is Buggin"
B	10	"The Move"

== Personnel ==
The group's lineup at the time comprised:

- AJ Rok – MC
- B-Luv – MC
- DJ Curt Cazal – DJ

== Release history ==
Year	Format	Label	Notes
1988	LP	B-Boy Records	Original release;
2005	CD and LP	Traffic Entertainment Group	Reissue discussed in the 2008 RapReviews retrospective.
