= T La Rock =

American rapper

- Also known as: The Lyrical King
- Born: Terrence Ronnie Keaton; September 16, 1961 (age 65)
- Origin: Bronx, New York, U.S.
- Genre: Hip hop
- Occupations: Rapper, record producer
- Instrument: Microphone
- Years active: 1984–2018, 2019–present
- Labels: Def Jam; Fresh / Sleeping Bag Records; Virgin / EMI Records (Europe)

Terrence Ronnie Keaton known by the stage name T La Rock, (born September 16, 1961) is an American old-school emcee best known for his collaboration with Def Jam Recordings co-founder Rick Rubin and the 1984 single "It's Yours."

== Biography ==
=== Early years ===
Keaton was born in Manhattan and raised in the Bronx borough of New York City. A former break dancer, he is the older brother of fellow old-school MC Special K of the Treacherous Three as well as rapper T.O.N.E.-z also known as Style or Tony Tone. Keaton stands 6'4" tall and began in the 1970s as a DJ, a break dancer and an emcee,

=== Hip-hop career ===
In 1984, Rick Rubin released "It's Yours" 12-inch single (Cat. PT-104/DJ000), which was the very first release on Def Jam Recordings. Although some might argue that LL Cool J's "I Need a Beat" 12-inch single was the first, this is not exactly true. The "It's Yours" recording was something that Rubin put out a few months before joining forces with Russell Simmons. The song was the first single to feature a Def Jam logo, but it was released through producer Arthur Baker's independent label Partytime, which was the hip hop division of his dance music label Streetwise Records. The recording was never part of Def Jam’s collection of master recordings. For its 30th anniversary, however, the track was licensed back to Def Jam/Universal, which pressed it on 180-gram vinyl.

In a 1996 interview with The New York Times, Def Jam co-founder Simmons commented about the effect T La Rock and "It's Yours" had on the early hip hop scene:

["It's Yours"] was big; big in the underground. T [La Rock] started the trend and a new direction in hip-hop. He used 40-letter words. He created a special poetry. LL Cool J was the second release on the label. He borrowed ideas and attitude from T. LL would agree.

The influence of Keaton's "It's Yours" was significant. The song was sampled by countless artists, including hip-hop group Public Enemy in "Louder than a Bomb" from its 1988 release It Takes a Nation of Millions to Hold Us Back; Nas in "The World is Yours" from his 1994 album, Illmatic; by many sample-based house-music tracks by Todd Terry. The song was later in the soundtrack of the video game Grand Theft Auto IV, on the old school hip hop radio station "The Classics 104.1." Later, in 2020, it appeared in Grand Theft Auto V's in-game radio station known as "KULT 99.1 FM" once The Cayo Perico Heist update was added.

"It's Yours" was also used by the Beastie Boys on its song "Paul Revere" off the 1986 album, Licensed to Ill, an album also produced by Rick Rubin and released on Def Jam Recordings. On the Sirius XM show "Sway In The Morning," Ad-Rock of the Beastie Boys pointed out that he can be heard on the backing vocals of "It's Yours."

Wu-Tang Clan did not sample Keaton in the track "It's Yourz" on its album Wu-Tang Forever, but the chorus of that song clearly emulated him. Southern emcee Mystikal did a remake of "It's Yours" on his 1997 album Unpredictable. The song sampled the original drums and had a similar hook, but it had a southern twist to it as it was titled "It Yearns."

On the strength of "It's Yours," Keaton was signed by Fresh/Sleeping Bag Records and released two albums: Lyrical King (From the Boogie Down Bronx in 1987, and On a Warpath in 1989. Lyrical King was produced by Keaton and DJ Louie Lou (La Rock's original DJ) Kurtis Mantronik also produced two songs on the album ("Back to Burn" and "Base Machine), while Hollywood & T Ka Rock produced On a Warpath. The title song "On a Warpath" was produced by [T La Rock & DJ Hollywood- Hollywood Impact. At present 2022 T La Rock Is set to have a movie produced which will be based on his life story. Currently in negotiations with Hulu/Disney

=== 1994 injury and recovery ===
In 1994, Keaton suffered a traumatic brain injury while breaking up a fight in front of his brother's Bronx apartment building. Initially treated at the Jacobi Medical Center in the Bronx, he was subsequently treated at the Staten Island University Hospital in April 1995, then, between October 1995 and November 1996, lived at the Haym Salomon Home for Nursing and Rehabilitation in Bensonhurst, Brooklyn, where he recovered from memory loss and a loss of motor skills.

In 2021, Keaton was working on a film project about his life, written by Virgil Williams. He also began to record new music. Keaton is currently back on stage performing all of his hits, both in the United States and internationally. He performed in Brazil in August 2008.

== Discography ==
=== Albums ===
Album information
Lyrical King (From the Boogie Down Bronx)
- Released: 1987
- Chart positions: No. 64 Top R&B/Hip-Hop Albums
- RIAA certification:
- Singles: "Tudy Fruity Judy," "It's Time to Chill," "Back to Burn," "Big Beat in London" (UK only)
On a Warpath
- Released: 1989
- Chart positions:
- RIAA certification:
- Singles: "Runaway," "I'm Gettin Mine," "Keep That Groove"
The Lost Tapes
- Released: 2000
- Chart positions:
- RIAA certification:
- Singles:
