= E.T.W. (album) =

Studio album by End Time Warriors
- Released: 1989
- Studios: Crosstown Recorders, The Church Studios
- Genre: Christian hip hop
- Length: 41:58
- Label: ForeFront
- Producer: Tommy Cathey

End Time Warriors chronology
E.T.W. (1989)	Stop the Wild Hype (1991)

E.T.W. is End Time Warriors' debut album released in 1989 through ForeFront Records.

== Track listing ==
No.	Title	Length
1.	"We Are Warriors"	5:29
2.	"Let Love Live"	3:46
3.	"Satan, You're Cancelled"	3:05
4.	"E.T.W."	4:01
5.	"Fun 4 a Minute"	5:04
6.	"Too Busy Dissin'"	4:57
7.	"I Want You Back In My Life"	5:33
8.	"Shakin' Up the Joint"	4:20
9.	"I Gotta Get Out"	3:53
10.	"Bonus Rap Track"	3:50
