= End Time Warriors =

American hip hop group

- Also known as: E.T.W
- Origin: United States
- Genre: Christian hip hop
- Years active: 1989–1997
- Label: Forefront
- Past members: M.C. Free; M.C. L. King; Johnnie Jam

End Time Warriors (also known as E.T.W.) were founded by MC Free, MC L King and Johnnie Jam. E.T.W. was one of the first successful Christian rap groups releasing their first album in 1989 on ForeFront Records. Much like fellow rookie label mates DC Talk, they featured fun, upbeat, and direct rhymes about their faith and the gospel. E.T.W's lyrics grew darker through their career and drinking, drugs, and violence became major themes in their music as they addressed problems in hip-hop culture. One of their biggest hits was their cover of Al Green's "Let's Stay Together", and their song "Give It Up" was nominated for a Dove Award. They broke up in the mid-1990s.

== History ==
Their debut album was released in 1989 on ForeFront Records. In total, they released five full-length albums and the cover, "If God Is My Father", released on the Larry Norman tribute album One Way: Songs of Larry Norman in 1995. Their last album is Ain't Nobody Dyin' But Us, released in 1997.

== Discography ==
- E.T.W. (1989)
- Stop the Wild Hype (1991)
- Let's Stay Together (1993)
- Extended Play Remixes (1995)
- Psychotheosocioghettopathic (1995)
- Ain't Nobody Dyin' But Us (1997)
