= Tuff Crew =

American hip hop group

- Origin: Philadelphia, Pennsylvania, U.S.
- Genres: Hip hop
- Years active: 1985–present
- Labels: Traffic Entertainment, Soo Def Records, DangerZone Music Group
- Members: Ice Dog, LA Kidd, Tone Love, DJ Too Tuff, Monty G
- Website: www.facebook.com/DangerZoneMusicGroup

Tuff Crew is a hip hop group from Philadelphia, Pennsylvania. Members include Ice Dog, L. A. Kid, Tone Love, Monty G, and DJ Too Tuff.

== Career ==
They released four albums. Their joint debut LP with The Krown Rulers from Camden, New Jersey included production by the Ultramagnetic MCs' Kool Keith and Ced Gee, with a style that was bass-heavy with the Roland TR-808 drum machine and E-mu SP-12 sampler, raw "street" lyrics and aggressive scratch DJing. They performed with Public Enemy, Run–D.M.C., Biz Markie, Big Daddy Kane, Rob Base and DJ E-Z Rock, LL Cool J, and many others. They toured the US as the support act for 2Live Crew, and were fan favorites on the groundbreaking Street Beat radio program on Power 99, hosted by Lady B. They were racially mixed and ethnically diverse, and were regular performers at the After Midnight club in North Philly, once the largest Hip-Hop club in America. Their contemporaries included DJ Jazzy Jeff & The Fresh Prince, DJ Cash Money and Marvelous, Cool C, Schoolly D, MC Breeze, and Three Times Dope.

During the recording of their fourth album "Still Dangerous", the group was joined by Smooth K and DJ Cutzology. Members Tone Love & DJ Too Tuff were absent during this 1991 recording working on outside project Danger Zone Mobb Sqwad.

LA Kidd is married to Bunny D from L'Trimm.

== Charts ==
- "My Parta Town" peaked at #23 on the Billboard Hot Rap Singles charts (1989).
- "Back to Wreck Shop" reached #74 on the Billboard Hot R&B/Hip-Hop Songs charts (1989).

== Discography ==
- Get Smart 12" (1985, So Def)
- Philly Style 12" (1986, So Def)
- Phanjam EP (1987, So Def)
- Danger Zone LP (1988, Warlock)
- Back To Wreck Shop LP (1989, Warlock)
- Still Dangerous LP (1991, Warlock)
- DJ Too Tuff's Lost Archives CD (2008, Traffic Entertainment)
- Remember? EP (2011, Solid Ground)
- The Best of DJ Too Tuff CD (2013, DangerZone Music Group)
- The Early Sessions 1985-1986 EP (2016, Chopped Herring Records)
- DJ Too Tuff's Lost Archives EP (2020, Chopped Herring Records)

== Appears on ==
- One Voice Pride - LP/CD RuffHouse Records - Hittin' Hard Balls
- 2004 Warlock Records Throwback Attack
- Scratch Masters (2x12") Deuce Ace Housin' Strictly Bizness
- Scratch Masters 2 (2xLP) Soul Food Strictly Bizness
- Warlock's Freaky Beats And Crazy Grooves (LP) She Rides The Pony
- Bellaphon Germany The Rhythm Story So Far.... (CD3") My Part Of Town (Remix)
- Rhythm Records Best Of Hip Hop (4xCD)
- Low Price Music Cream Live Two (3xCD) Soul Food Deconstruction It Will
- My Part Of Town BBE It Will Take A Nation Of Millions To Hold Us Back (2xLP)
- My Part Of Town BBE Mixmag Live Rae & Christian Blazing The Crop (3xLP)
- My Part Of Town DMC Publishing Rae & Christian - Blazing The Crop (CD)
- My Part Of Town DMC Publishing Blazing The Crop (CD)
- My Part Of Town Mixer Fusion Beats (CD)
- Soul Food Cutting Edge Classic Material - Philadelphia (CD) Let It Rip, My Parta *Town Waste Management Music Toxic (3xLP)
- My Part Of Town (Remix)
- DJ Too Tuff- The Lost Archives (CD/EP)
- Aroe & The Soundmakers- The Wreck Shop - Philly Golden Era Vol.1 Mixtape (feat. DJ Too Tuff & LA Kidd) (CD)
