= JVC Force =

Hip hop group (1987-1993)

- Origin: Islip, Long Island, New York
- Genre: East Coast hip hop
- Years active: 1987–1993
- Labels: B-Boy; Idlers/Warlock Records; Big Beat/Atlantic Records
- Members: AJ Rok; B-Luv; DJ Curt Cazal

JVC Force (also rendered J.V.C. F.O.R.C.E) was an American hip hop group from Islip, New York.

== Background and history ==
Composed of DJ Curt Cazal (Curtis Andre Small) and the emcees AJ Rok (AJ Woodson) and B-Luv (William Taylor), JVC Force is best known for the single "Strong Island," which became an underground hit during the 1980s.

JVC Force is a backronym standing for "Justified by Virtue of Creativity For Obvious Reasons Concerning Entertainment". According to Woodson, "the letters didn't actually stand for anything in the beginning. JVC was the name of Curt's crew I believe. B-Boy thought we might get sued by JVC Electronics so our first release has the named spelled J.V.C. F.O.R.C.E."

They were signed by B-Boy Records in 1987 and released their first album Doin' Damage in 1988. After Force Field was released in 1990 on Warlock Records, the group signed with Big Beat Records but broke up after the release of the single “Big Trax” in 1992, leaving a third album unreleased.

== After dissolving ==
Group member Curt Cazal remained prominent as a DJ and producer releasing tracks with many artists including Keith Murray (notably on his 1992 debut 12" appearing as “Keefy Keef”), M.O.P., Tony Touch and Boot Camp Clik. In 1994, Curt Cazal joined with rapper Q-Ball to form the group Qball & Curt Cazal, a.k.a. QNC.

Since the 1990s, Curt Cazal and QNC have also collaborated frequently with artists; Aim, Rae & Christian and released music on Grand Central Records.

Group member AJ Rok, became a freelance writer whose byline has appeared in several print publications and online sites including The Source, Vibe, the Village Voice, Upscale, Sonicnet.com, Launch.com, Rolling Out Newspaper, Daily Challenge Newspaper, Spiritual Minded Magazine, Word Up! Magazine, On The Go Magazine and several others.

In 2013, Chopped Herring Records officially archived JVC Force's unreleased third album (and other previously unreleased tracks, including demos and instrumentals) and released “The 1992-1993 Unreleased EP” and in 2014, The 1987-1993 Unreleased EP.

In 2014, AJ Woodson along with Damon K. Jones started Black Westchester Magazine, an African American Online News Magazine. AJ Woodson is now a Journalism Fellow of the Craig Newmark Graduate School of Journalism and has released several books.

== Discography ==
- Strong Island / Nu Skool 12" (1987)
- Take It Away / Strong Island (The Blue Mix) 12" (1988)
- Love Line / Stylin Lyrics (12") (1988)
- Doin' Damage LP (1988)
- Intro 2 Dance / It's A Force Thing 12" (1990)
- Force Field LP (1990)
- Big Trax / 6 Feet Back On The Map 12" (1992)
- The 1992-1993 Unreleased EP EP (2012)
- The 1987-1993 Unreleased EP EP (2013)
