= Success-n-Effect =

American hip hop group

- Origin: Atlanta, Georgia, United States
- Genres: Hip hop
- Years active: 1988–1990s
- Labels: On Top, Ichiban
- Members: DJ Len; Professor Lazy Rock; Big Jon

Success-n-Effect was an Atlanta-based hip hop group, known for their controversial 1989 single, "Roll It Up". The group started out as part of a mixed tape crew named Edward J & the J Team. King Edward J as he is referred to now, is credited as being the original mixed tape king in Atlanta, Georgia. King Edward J is responsible for the first generation of the J Team that included Edward J, Lady DJ, Dangerous D, MC Shy D, DJ Man, DJ Len, and Professor Lazy Rock. The second generation formed after DJ Len and Professor Lazy Rock signed their recording contract, and included King Edward J, DJ Kizzy Rock, MC Jamm, Magic Mark, Playa Poncho, DJ Smurf A.K.A. (Mr. Collipark), Dee Most Def, Erica D, China, DJ Majesty, DJ Dlx, DJ T-Bone, DJ Jaycee (Ludacris' official DJ), and Tre Luv. Success-n-Effect's hit song used extreme racial language but ends on a positive anti-drug, pro-education message. The group is considered one of the more well known early political hip hop groups. DJ Len and Professor Lazy Rock were among its core members. They released two of their three albums on Ichiban Records.

== Discography ==
- 1989: In the Hood
- 1991: Back-n-Effect
- 1993: Drive-by of Uh Revolutionist
