= (Nothing Serious) Just Buggin' =

Debut single by Whistle

Single by Whistle

from the album Whistle
- Released: February 1986
- Genre: Hip hop
- Length: 5:03
- Label: Select (U.S.); Champion (UK); Ariola (Europe); CBS (Australia); WEA (Canada); Phonogram (Japan)
- Songwriter(s): Howie Tee; The Kangol Kid; Whistle
- Producer(s): Howie Tee; The Kangol Kid

Whistle singles chronology
"(Nothing Serious) Just Buggin'" (1986)	"Live at the North Pole: Santa Is a B-Boy" (1986)

"(Nothing Serious) Just Buggin'" is the debut single by American hip hop and contemporary R&B group Whistle, from their 1986 eponymous debut studio album. It was first released as a single in 1985, and was a top ten hit and the group's only major success in the UK, where it peaked at No. 7 on the UK Singles Chart in early 1986. On the U.S. Billboard R&B and dance charts, it reached numbers 17 and 18, respectively.

== Sampling ==
The song is among the most scratched of all time.

== Reception ==
John Leland at Spin said, "Fluffy, catchy, lightweight, and—under the right circumstances—a lot of fun. Whistle is about hooks and silliness. The only lengthy rap on the record is presented as a tongue-twister, and the mix is a collection of sonic gags. Punch lines show up late and ridiculously processed."

== Track listings ==
7"

1. "(Nothing Serious) Just Buggin'" – 3:46
2. "Buggin' Much Hard" – 4:10

7" (Alternative Netherlands release)

1. "Just Buggin' (Nothing Serious)" – 4:15
2. "Just Buggin' Much Hard" (Dub Version) – 4:00

12"

1. "(Nothing Serious) Just Buggin'" – 5:03
2. "Buggin' Much Hard" – 5:36

12" (Alternative Netherlands release)

1. "(Nothing Serious) Just Buggin'" (Minimix) – 7:23
2. "Just Buggin' Much Hard" (Bug-Bug Mix) – 5:36

== Charts ==
Chart (1986)	Peak position
Belgium (Ultratop 50 Flanders)	7
Netherlands (Dutch Top 40)	5
Netherlands (Single Top 100)	4
UK Singles (OCC)	7
US Hot Dance/Club Play (Billboard)	18
US Hot Black Singles (Billboard)	17
