= Boogie Boys =

American hip-hop group

The Boogie Boys
- Origin: Harlem, New York, United States
- Genre: Hip-hop
- Years active: 1980-1988
- Label: Capitol
- Past members: William "Boogie Knight" Stroman; Joe "Romeo J.D." Malloy; Rudy "Lil' Raheim" Sheriff

The Boogie Boys were an American hip-hop group from Harlem, New York City.

It was the first hip-hop group to sign with Capitol Records, and it had a major hit in America in 1985 with the single "A Fly Girl" and two successful albums. Other hit singles included "Girl Talk" which peaked at 62 on Billboard's R&B chart.

In 1988, Rudy Sheriff left the group and, soon after, it disbanded.

The group were veterans in sampling using high-end systems such as the Synclavier, the Fairlight, an Emulator, and the DKI Synergy synthesizer.

== Members ==
- William "Boogie Knight" Stroman (deceased)
- Joe "Romeo J.D." Malloy
- Rudy "Lil' Rahiem" Sheriff

== Discography ==
=== Albums ===
Year	Title	Label	US R&B Chart	US Top 200
1985	City Life	Capitol/EMI Records	10	56
1986	Survival of the Freshest	Capitol/EMI Records	27	124
1988	Romeo Knight	Capitol/EMI Records	46	117

=== Charting singles ===
Year	Title	US R&B Chart	US Top 100
1985	"You Ain't Fresh (High Noon Mix)"	60	-
1985	"A Fly Girl"	6	102
1986	"Girl Talk"	62	-
