= LA Dream Team =

American hip hop group

L.A. Dream Team
- Origin: Los Angeles, California, U.S.
- Genres: Hip Hop, Electro, R&B
- Years active: 1985–1996
- Labels: Dream Team Records, MCA
- Past members: Snake Puppy; Rudy Pardee; The Real Richie Rich; Lisa Love; Big Burt; Robin Williams (The Robin); Tanisha Hill (Tish Jones)

The L.A. Dream Team was a hip hop group based in Los Angeles, California, active 1985–1989, 1993, and 1996. The group was founded by Chris "Snake Puppy" Wilson and Rudy Pardee in 1985. They were among the earliest hip hop acts from the West Coast.

== History ==
The group was formed in the early 1980s by Rudy Pardee and Chris "Snake Puppy" Wilson. The duo formed their own Dream Team Records label, going on to release their own records and also releases by other California rap artists. Some of the group's best known early releases are "The Dream Team Is in the House", "Nursery Rhymes" and "Rockberry Jam". Lisa Love, The Real Richie Rich, and Big Burt later joined the group. In 1986, the group signed with MCA Records, which released the albums Kings Of The West Coast (1985) and Bad To The Bone (1986). Following Love's death in an automobile accident in 1986, she was replaced by Robin Williams (The Robin) and Tanisha Hill (Tish Jones). This lineup recorded the 1989 album Back to Black for MCA Records. The group's commercial visibility decreased alongside the mainstream growth of electro music in the late 1980s and the emergence of West Coast gangsta rap in the early 1990s.

From 1990 to 1991, Pardee recorded with various artists. Between 1992 and 1994, Pardee, Friend-Z, and TJ "Ragaman-T" performed as DTP (initially Dream Team Posse, later altered to Diverse Thought Process). The trio recorded an unreleased album titled Footsoldiers On Maneuvers, which featured collaborations with DBS Mob and Paranoia Dragon. They released the single "Rockberry Revisited", an updated version of "Rockberry Jam", backed with the B-side "100 Proof (To the Zoom)".

Chris Wilson also went on to work with others, and made an unreleased ep. He also went on to a career in video and music production. Pardee worked in computing, working for Universal as a business services analyst, and later a project manager.

Pardee and Wilson later reunited to release a single in the G-funk genre.

Pardee later formed the group, Family Dream, featuring former Dream Team members Big Burt, Tanisha Hill and The Robin. The group was signed to Motown Records. Rudy Pardee died in a scuba-diving accident in 1998.

== Discography ==
=== Singles ===
- "Calling on the Dream Team" (12") (1985) Dream Team
- "Rockberry Jam" (12") (1985) Dream Team
- "The Dream Team Is in the House" (12") (1985) Dream Team
- "And the Orchestra Plays" (12") (1986) MCA
- "Hollywood Boulevard" / "You're Just Too Young" (12") (1986) MCA
- "Nursery Rhymes" (12") (1986) MCA
- "The Dream Team Is in the House" (12") (1986) MCA
- "Citizens on Patrol" / "Hollywood Boulevard" (12") (1987) MCA
- "Rudy and Snake" (12") (1987) MCA
- "Pitchin a Fit" (12") (1988) MCA
- "She Only Rock and Rolls" / "Stop To Start" (12") (1988) MCA
- "Doin' the Nasty" (12") (1989) MCA
- "You're Slippin" (12") (1989) MCA
- "The Bounce" (12") (1991) Dream Team
- "100 Proof (To the Zoom)" (12"), (cassette), (compact disc) (Excello Records) (1993)
- "Rockberry Revisited" (1993)

=== Albums ===
- Kings of the West Coast (LP) (1986) MCA
- Bad to the Bone (LP) (1986) MCA
- Back to Black (LP) (1989) MCA

== Television ==
- What's Happening Now (1987) Taking The Rap
