= Antoinette (rapper) =

American rapper

- Also known as: M.C. Antoinette, The Gangstress, The Female Rakim
- Born: Antoinette Lovell Patterson; May 4, 1969 (age 57); New York City, U.S.
- Origin: The Bronx, New York City, U.S.
- Genres: Golden age hip hop, East Coast hip hop
- Occupation: Rapper
- Years active: 1987–1991; 1997
- Label: Next Plateau
- Website: therealantoinette.com

Antoinette Lovell Patterson (born May 4, 1969), known simply by the mononym Antoinette, is an American rapper from Bronx, New York, who released two albums, during the late 1980s and early 1990s.

She is mainly remembered for her beef with MC Lyte. She was mentioned in the Vibe Hip-Hop Divas publication and her song "I Got An Attitude" (1987) was included in Complex's list of "The 50 Best Rap Songs by Women".

== Biography ==
She made her first appearance on the producer Hurby Azor's 1987 compilation album, Hurby's Machine, with her song "I Got An Attitude".

== Discography ==
=== Studio albums ===
List of albums, with selected chart positions
Title	Album details	Peak chart positions
Title	Album details	US R&B /HH
Who's the Boss?	Released: June 30, 1989; Label: Next Plateau; Formats: CD, LP, Cassette	47
Burnin' at 20 Below	Released: May 30, 1990; Label: Next Plateau; Formats: CD, LP, Cassette	66

=== Singles ===
==== As lead artist ====
List of singles, with selected chart positions
Title	Year	Peak chart positions	Album
Title	Year	US Rap	Album
"Hit 'Em With This" (Note: "Hit 'Em With This" was released as a split single with "Push It" and "I Am Down" by Salt-N-Pepa.)	1988	—	The House That Rap Built
"Unfinished Business" (with Hurby's Machine)	1988	—	Non-album single
"Baby Make It Boom"	1988	—	Who's the Boss?
"Who's the Boss?"	1989	17	Who's the Boss?
"Shake, Rattle & Roll"	1989	—	Who's the Boss?
"I'm Crying"	1989	—	Who's the Boss?
"Never Get Enough"	1990	—	Burnin' at 20 Below
"She Operates around the Clock"	1990	—	Burnin' at 20 Below
"Bring It Home" (Note: "Published as "M.C. Antoinette".)	2016	—	Burnin' at 20 Below
"—" denotes releases that did not chart or were not released in that country.

==== Featured singles ====
List of featured singles, showing year released and album name
Title	Year	Album
"I Got an Attitude" (Hurby's Machine featuring Antoinette)	1987	The House That Rap Built

==== Promotional singles ====
List of singles, showing year released and album name
Title	Year	Album
"I Wanna Be Me"	1990	Burnin' at 20 Below

=== Guest appearances ===
List of non-single guest appearances, with other performing artists, showing year released and album name
Title	Year	Other artist(s)	Album
"Bluntz & Bakakeemis"	1997	Cru, Tracey Lee, Jim Hydro	Da Dirty 30
