= Who's the Boss? (album) =

Studio album by Antoinette
- Released: July 1989
- Recorded: 1988–1989
- Genre: Hip hop
- Label: Next Plateau Entertainment
- Producer: I.G. Off, Jay Ellis, Ultramagnetic MCs

Antoinette chronology
Who's the Boss? (1989)	Burnin' at 20 Below (1990)

Singles from Lyte as a Rock
- 1. "Baby Make It Boom" Released: 1988; 2. "Who's the Boss?" Released: 1989; 3. "Shake, Rattle & Roll" Released: September 22, 1989; 4. "I'm Crying" Released: 1989

Professional ratings
Review scores
Source	Rating
AllMusic	3/5 stars

Who's the Boss? is the debut album by rapper Antoinette. It was released in 1989 through Next Plateau Entertainment. The album was produced by I.G. Off, Jay Ellis, and the Ultramagnetic MCs. "I'm Crying" allegedly plagiarized Tam-Tam's "I'm Cryin'".

The album peaked at No. 47 on the Top R&B Albums chart. The title track peaked at No. 17 on the Billboard Hot Rap Songs.

The album has gained New York-based rapper Antoinette praise from many rap acts such as Rakim, Yo-Yo, and Salt n Pepa's Spinderella for its lyrical agility and raw vocals.

Antoinette was praised for her chill, deep vocals and delivery, especially on cuts like "I Got an Attitude" and "Who’s the Boss".

== Track listing ==
1. "Shake, Rattle & Roll" - 4:39
2. "Go for What You Know" - 3:33
3. "Who's the Boss" - 3:25
4. "Watch the Gangstress Boogie" - 4:30
5. "This Girl Is Off on Her Own" - 3:22
6. "Here She Comes" - 2:29
7. "Lights Out, Party's Over" - 3:36
8. "I'm Crying" - 3:54
9. "The Gangstress" - 3:53
10. "A Is for Antoinette" - 3:16
11. "Baby Make It Boom" - 3:37
