= Michael Peace =

American rapper

- Born: November 30, 1958 (age 67)
- Origin: New York City, New York, United States
- Genres: Christian rap, Christian hip hop
- Occupations: Rapper, pastor
- Years active: 1985–1997
- Labels: Reunion, Starsong

Michael Peace (born November 30, 1958) is an American rapper and one of Christian rap's first solo artists. Peace was raised in New York City as the second oldest of four children.

Considered the Grandfather of Christian hip hop, he received the "African-American of Distinction" award in 1994 for his commitment to urban communities from then New York Governor Mario Cuomo.

Peace is the founder and president of Michael Peace and Associates, a multi-faceted youth, urban affairs, music and general consulting organization. He has developed curriculum for educational at-risk children and is part of a team spearheading the establishing of abstinence education funding for the city of Rochester (the City-Wide Black Experience History game), as well as being an instructor in public schools.

Peace is the executive director and pastor of Bethel Express of AMERICA, a non-profit in Rochester, New York. He earned a B.S. degree in 1981 in mass media and speech communications from State University of New York at Brockport. In the early 1990s he was a contributing writer to Christian music publication Digital Audio Notebook/Diganote. He was the co-author of an article in 2000 in the Journal of Community Health entitled "Abstinence Education for Urban Youth".

Peace started out in 1985 with several albums released by Reunion and StarSong Records in the late 1980s and early 1990s. In 1995, he stopped touring in order to concentrate on mentoring at-risk youth in his hometown of Rochester.

After a long layoff, Peace made a live recording at Kingdom Bound in Darien Center, New York on August 7, 2007. It was his first new recording since 1994. During the live session, he assembled about two dozen artists to put together the "world's biggest freestyle single", where rappers each had several seconds to add their own unique lyrical spin to a funky beat.

Peace was married in 1987, and they have one son. He is also a 2018 recipient of the Martin Luther King Everyday Hero. Peace said that God told him "to minister by faith and not charge a fee." Thus, he only made $1,000-2,500 per concert at the height of his career. "The couple depended on God to provide for the ministry, and He did."

== Discography ==
- RRRock It Right, 1987
- Rappin' Bold, 1988
- Vigilante of Hope, 1989
- Loud-N-Clear, 1990
- Threat to Society, 1991
- Outta Control, 1994
