= The Krown Rulers =

American hip hop group

The Krown Rulers are an American Hip Hop group once well known in Philadelphia, Pennsylvania and Camden, New Jersey. The duo was made up of DJ Royal Rocker (Roger Perry) and MC Grand Pubah (Terrell Ivey). They were discovered and signed to Soo Deff Records by DJ Too Tuff of Tuff Crew and appeared on the Tuff Crew PHANJAM album co/produced by Ced G of Ultramagnetic MCs and Tuff Crew in 1987. They were from Camden. They flourished in the 1980s, releasing the LP "Paper Chase" on the Warlock label in 1988. Two of their hits were "B-Boy Document" and "Kick the Ball." The album was unusual in having a medieval theme in the cover art, showing two musicians in armor. In 1996, after an 8-year hiatus, they released their second LP, "Back On The Throne". A vinyl pressing was available in limited amounts. After 1996, a few scattered singles were made, a few of which are available on YouTube.
