= MC ADE =

American music producer and rapper

M.C. A.D.E. (born Adrian Hines in Miami, Florida) is an American music producer and rapper who pioneered hip-hop Miami bass music. His 1985 single, "Bass Rock Express", is considered to be the start of Miami bass. He recorded on the 4-Sight record label, which was owned by his Dad Billy Hines, considered to be the first Independent Hip Hop label of the entire south. His name stands for Adrian Does Everything, which refers to the fact that he both rapped and produced his own records.

On Just Somethin to Do, M.C. A.D.E. recorded the song "Romantic Rhyme"; the song samples The Floaters' Float On.

== Discography ==
- Just Somethin' to Do (1987)
- How Much Can You Take (1989)
- An All Out Bash (1991)
- In the Arms of Bass (1994)
- Ain't No Thang Like the Game (1996)
