= Three Times Dope =

American hip hop group

Three Times Dope was an American hip hop/rap group from Philadelphia, Pennsylvania consisting of EST (Robert Waller), Chuck Nice (Walter Griggs) and Woody Wood (Duerwood Beale). 3xD, as they were called for short, were a part of the Hilltop Hustlers Crew (which also included Steady B, Cool C, Da Youngsta's and others). At first, they recorded under the name 3-D.

== Career ==
Their debut LP, Original Stylin' was well-received, peaking at #122 on the Billboard 200 Album Chart and the group became well known for the terminology they created, such as "Acknickulous" and "The Giddy Up".

3xD's follow-up album Live from Acknickulous Land was an attempt at a more serious work. Despite spawning two minor hits, it failed to chart on the Billboard 200. It did, however, peak at #30 on Billboard's R&B/Hip-Hop Album chart.

3xD later became closely associated with rapper/producer Kwamé. Their third album, Da Sequel, was not released until 1998.

EST would eventually go on to become an award-winning songwriter for top-tier acts, such as Britney Spears with an unreleased song called "Giving It Up For Love" in 2004 but most notably a Grammy nomination in 2005 for Destiny's Child's "Cater 2 U".

== Discography ==
=== As 3-D ===
- 1987 Crushin & Bussin' (12")
- 1988 From Da Giddy Up (12")
- 1988 Original Styling (LP)

=== As Three Times Dope ===
- 1988 The Greatest Man Alive (12")
- 1988 Original Stylin' (LP)
- 1989 Funky Dividends (12") – #22 Billboard R&B/Hip-Hop
- 1989 Original Stylin' (12")
- 1990 Live From Acknickulous Land (LP)
- 1990 No Words (12")
- 1990 Mr. Sandman (12")
- 1990 Weak at the Knees (12") – #41 Billboard R&B/Hip-Hop
- 1991 Peace Ya'Self (12") – #85 Billboard R&B/Hip-Hop
- 1994 Da Sequel (12")
- 1999 The Sequel 3 (LP)

== Sampling ==
- Muddy Waters "Mannish Boy" and Jane Curtin from a Saturday Night Live sketch - "Greatest Man Alive" (1988)
- Delegation(UK) "Oh Honey" - "Funky Dividends"(1989)
- Marvin Gaye "What's Going On" - "Increase The Peace"(1989)
- The Impressions "We're a Winner" - "No Words" (1990)
- Steve Arrington "Weak at the Knees" - "Weak in the Knees"
