= The Skinny Boys =

American hip hop group

Background information
- Origin: Bridgeport, Connecticut, U.S.
- Genres: Hip hop
- Years active: 1985–current
- Labels: Warlock; Jive/RCA
- Members: Superman Jay; Shockin' Shaun; The Human Jock Box

The Skinny Boys are an American hip hop group, originally from Bridgeport, Connecticut. The Skinny Boys members are Superman Jay (James J. Harrison), his brother Shockin' Shawn (Shaun Harrison), and The Human Jock Box (Jacque D. Lloyd). Previously, The Skinny Boys were influenced by the much more prominent hip hop pioneers The ColdCrush Brothers, The Fat Boys, and their single "Jock Box" was influenced by The Disco 3 aka The Fat Boys'and all 3 albums were produced and written the The group members

== History and appearances in multimedia ==
The Skinny Boys began creating music and performing together in 1981 as the Superior Crush MC's on the independent record label Bush, run by Rhonda Bush. Indeed, Rhonda and Mark Bush were the group's managers. The Skinny Boys' first release was a 12-inch single "Awesome" b/w "Skinny Boys" in 1985. The New York City-based label Warlock Records signed the group in 1986. That year the label released two more of their singles, "Jockbox" and "Unity", as well as an album, Weightless. Featured on Weightless were a handful of human beatbox songs, such as "Jockbox" and "Get Funky". Although the trio wrote and produced their own recordings, sometimes they were assisted by others such as Chuck Chillout and Flavor Flav.

The group went on to sign with Jive Records and had a two albums released by that label, namely Skinny & Proud and Skinny (They Can't Get Enough).

The single "Jockbox" was used as the theme song of the Comedy Central television series Workaholics. The song has also appeared in commercials for Wendy's.

At a school in Japan, 6th grade students have used music by The Skinny Boys for "Fresh Friday".

As of September 21, 2021, they have been awarded "The Key to the City" in Bridgeport.

== Discography ==
- 1986: Weightless
- 1987: Skinny & Proud
- 1988: Skinny (They Can't Get Enough)
