= Whistle (group) =

American hip hop group

- Origin: United States
- Genres: R&B; hip hop
- Years active: 1985–1992
- Label: Select
- Past members: Jazzy Jazz; Kool Doobie; Silver Spinner; Kraze; Terk

Whistle was an American 1980s hip hop and contemporary R&B group that was composed of Jazzy Jazz, Kool Doobie, and DJ Silver Spinner. The group later brought in Kraze and then Terk after Kool Doobie left the group to go solo. The group's biggest hit single as a hip hop group was "(Nothing Serious) Just Buggin'" in 1986.

== Biography ==
The group's first two albums, Whistle (released in 1986) and Transformation (released in 1988) were produced by the Kangol Kid from UTFO and DJ Howie Tee. Kangol and Howie brought in keyboardist/sound wizard Gary Pozner (who had already become a staff producer at Select Records) to handle the sound sampling and help with beat creation. Whistle's third album, Always and Forever, was released in 1990 and was also produced by Kangol Kid. A fourth album, Get the Love, was released in 1992.

After the release of its second album, the group gave up rapping in favor of a contemporary R&B sound ("Barbara's Bedroom" (1987), "Bad Habit" (1990) and love ballads, including "Chance for Our Love" (1986), "Please Love Me" (1986), "Still My Girl" (1987), and "Right Next to Me" (1988). The group's biggest R&B hit single was a cover version of Heatwave's "Always and Forever" (1990), which reached No. 35 on the U.S. Billboard Hot 100 in June of that same year. After this, the group disbanded, as Jazzy Jazz went on to form another group called G.H.P. (Group Home Productions) with Free Daydreamer of the group Entouch and Will Skillz of the group Pure Blend. Terk went on to become involved in local and national politics while continuing work as an entrepreneur in entertainment.

"Right Next to Me" became a popular song in the Philippines, with some Filipino singers covering it, such as Jed Madela, Aaron, Johann Escanan, and Kimpoy Feliciano.

== Discography ==
=== Albums ===
- Whistle (1986)
- Transformation (1988)
- Always & Forever (1990)
- Get the Love (1992)
- The Best of Whistle (1995)

=== Singles ===
Year	Song	US Billboard			UK	Album
Year	Song	Hot 100	R&B	Dance	UK	Album
1986	"(Nothing Serious) Just Buggin'"	—	17	18	7	Whistle
1986	"Santa Is a B-Boy"	—	—	—	—	Live at the North Pole
1986	"Please Love Me"	—	—	—	91	Whistle
1987	"Barbara's Bedroom"	—	31	—	—	Whistle
1988	"Falling in Love"	—	41	—	—	Transformation
1988	"Still My Girl"	—	95	—	—	Transformation
1989	"Transformation"	—	—	—	—	Transformation
1989	"Right Next to Me"	60	52	—	—	Transformation
1990	"Bad Habit"	—	40	13	—	Always and Forever
1990	"Always and Forever"	35	9	—	—	Always and Forever
1991	"Do You Care?"	—	69	—	—	Always and Forever
1992	"I Am"	—	92	—	—	Get the Love
1992	"If You Don't Say"	—	53	—	—	Get the Love
"—" denotes releases that did not chart or were not released in that territory.
