= Vivian Green discography =

The discography of American singer Vivian Green includes seven studio albums and 20 singles.

== Albums ==
List of albums, with selected chart positions, sales figures and certifications
Title	Album details	Peak chart positions			Certifications	Sales
Title	Album details	US	US R&B /HH	US Indie	Certifications	Sales
A Love Story	Released: November 12, 2002; Label: Columbia; Format: CD, digital download	51	8	—	RIAA: Gold	US: 531,000
Vivian	Released: May 31, 2005; Label: Columbia; Format: CD, digital download	18	5	—		US: 225,000
Beautiful	Released: April 6, 2010; Label: E1; Format: CD, digital download	101	26	13		US: 22,061
The Green Room	Released: October 9, 2012; Label: E1; Format: CD, digital download	169	20	40		US: 14,000
Vivid	Released: August 7, 2015; Label: Make Noise, Caroline; Format: CD, digital download	—	10	23		US: 64,238
VGVI	Released: October 6, 2017; Label: Make Noise, Caroline; Format: CD, digital download	—	—	—		US: 1,300
Love Absolute	Released: November 13, 2020; Label: Make Noise, SoNo Recording Group; Format: CD, digital download	—	—	—		

== Singles ==
List of singles as lead artist, with selected chart positions
Year	Single	Chart positions				Album
Year	Single	US	US R&B /HH	US Dance	US Adult R&B	Album
2002	"Emotional Rollercoaster"	39	13	1	1	A Love Story
2003	"Fanatic"	—	52	7	15	A Love Story
2003	"What Is Love?"	—	75	—	19	A Love Story
2005	"Gotta Go Gotta Leave (Tired)"	102	24	1	1	Vivian
2005	"I Like It (But I Don't Need It)"	—	—	1	—	Vivian
2006	"Cursed"	—	—	—	21	Vivian
2010	"Beautiful"	—	43	—	10	Beautiful
2010	"Too Intense"	—	—	—	—	Beautiful
2011	"Missing You" (with Phoe Notes)	—	—	—	—	Non-album single
2012	"Oh Freedom"	—	—	—	—	Soundtrack for a Revolution — OST
2012	"Still Here" (with Brian Culbertson)	—	61	—	15	The Green Room
2012	"Anything Out There"	—	—	—	27	The Green Room
2015	"Get Right Back to My Baby"	—	25	—	6	Vivid
2016	"Grown Folks Music (Work)"	—	—	—	15	Vivid
2016	"I'm Not Broken (Act 2)"	—	—	—	—	Vivid
2017	"I Don't Know"	—	34	—	9	VGVI
2018	"Vibes"	—	—	—	12	VGVI
2020	"You Send Me"	—	—	—	—	Love Absolute
2020	"Where You Are"	—	—	—	—	Love Absolute
2020	"Light Up" (featuring Ghostface Killah)	—	—	—	—	Love Absolute

== Guest appearances ==
List of non-single guest appearances with other artists
Title	Year	Other artist(s)	Album
"I'll Be Your River"	2005	Cyndi Lauper	The Body Acoustic
"Sisters of Avalon"	2005	Cyndi Lauper, Ani DiFranco	The Body Acoustic
"Fine and Free"	2007	Guru	Guru's Jazzmatazz, Vol. 4: The Hip Hop Jazz Messenger: Back to the Future
"I Want You"	2008	Kim Waters	I Want You: Love in the Spirit of Marvin
"La La Means I Love You"	2012	Bob Baldwin	Betcha By Golly Wow: The Songs of Thom Bell
"Love"	2012	Zion	Legacy
"Greatness"	2012	Freeway	Diamond In the Ruff
