= Purpose (Algebra album) =

Studio album by Algebra
- Released: February 26, 2008
- Recorded: 2006/2008
- Genre: R&B, neo soul
- Length: 1:00:55
- Label: Kedar Records
- Producer: Bryan-Michael Cox, Kwamé, Eric Roberson, Carvin & Ivan

Algebra chronology
Purpose (2008)	Recovery (2013)

Purpose is the debut album by contemporary R&B singer, Algebra. It stayed on the Billboard Top R&B/Hip-Hop Albums chart for 14 weeks, peaking at No. 56.

== Track listing ==
1. At This Time
2. Halfway
3. Run and Hide
4. U Do It for Me
5. ABC's 1, 2, 3's (Interlude)/Happy After
6. My Pride
7. Holla Back (Interlude)/Simple Complication
8. What Happened?
9. No Idea
10. Tug of War
11. Can I Keep U?
12. I Think I Love U
13. Come Back
14. Now & Then
15. Where R We Now
