= Recovery (Algebra album) =

Studio album by Algebra Blessett
- Released: February 3, 2014
- Recorded: 2013
- Studios: Studio2Sixteen (Atlanta, GA); K1 Studios (Orange, NJ); Southside Sound (Nashville, TN); Tune Pusher LLC (Atlanta, GA); NeWFAM Entertainment Studios (Atlanta, GA); The Black Room (Atlanta, GA)
- Genres: Contemporary R&B; neo soul
- Length: 46:42
- Labels: BBE; eOne
- Producers: B Howard; Brett Baker; Bryan-Michael Cox; Kwamé; LT Moe; Shannon Sanders

Algebra Blessett chronology
Purpose (2008)	Recovery (2014)

Singles from Recovery
- 1. "Nobody But You" Released: June 19, 2013

Professional ratings
Review scores
Source	Rating
AllMusic	4/5 stars
The Guardian	4/5 stars
SoulTracks	(favorable)
The Musical Hype	4/5 stars

Recovery is the second studio album by American contemporary R&B/neo soul singer Algebra Blessett. It was released on February 3, 2014, via BBE Records. Recording sessions took place at Studio2Sixteen, Tune Pusher LLC, NeWFAM Entertainment Studios and The Black Room in Atlanta, at K1 Studios in Orange, New Jersey and at Southside Sound in Nashville. Production was handled by B Howard, Brett Baker, Bryan-Michael Cox, Kwamé, LT Moe and Shannon Sanders. It features guest appearance from Quinnes Parker. The album debuted at number 149 on the Billboard 200, number 23 on the Top R&B/Hip-Hop Albums and number 2 on the Heatseekers Albums in the United States.

AllMusic selected the album as one of the Favorite R&B Albums of 2014.

The album was preceded with a lone single "Nobody But You", with an accompanying music video directed by Be' Garrett. The song peaked at No. 42 on the Billboard R&B/Hip-Hop Airplay and No. 11 on the Adult R&B Songs charts, and made it to No. 39 on the 2014 year-end Adult R&B Airplay Songs chart.

== Track listing ==
No.	Title	Writer(s)	Producer(s)	Length
1.	"Exordium to Recovery (Give My Heart a Chance)"	Algebra Blessett; Todd Moore	LT Moe	0:51
2.	"Recovery"	Blessett; Kwamé Holland	Kwamé	3:48
3.	"Right Next to You"	Blessett; Holland	Kwamé	3:09
4.	"Nobody But You"	Blessett; Shannon Sanders	Shannon Sanders	2:45
5.	"Struggle to Be" (featuring Q)	Blessett; Quinnes Parker; Brett Baker	Brett Baker	4:15
6.	"Augment to Recovery (Give My Heart a Chance)"	Blessett; Moore	LT Moe	1:02
7.	"Forever"	Blessett; Sanders	Shannon Sanders	3:17
8.	"Writer's Block"	Blessett; Brandon Howard; Moore	B Howard; LT Moe (co.)	4:26
9.	"Paper Heart"	Blessett; Holland; Rudy Currence	Kwamé	3:54
10.	"Danger Zone"	Blessett; Moore	LT Moe	3:45
11.	"Mystery"	Blessett; Holland; Eric Roberson	Kwamé	3:13
12.	"Another Heartache"	Blessett; Moore	LT Moe	4:04
13.	"Better for Me"	Blessett; Holland; Josh Rivera	Kwamé	3:35
14.	"I'll Be OK"	Blessett; Bryan-Michael Cox	Bryan-Michael Cox	4:38
Total length:				46:42

== Personnel ==
- Algebra Felicia Blessett – vocals, executive producer
- Quinnes D. Parker – vocals & recording (track 5)
- Traneshia Chiles – backing vocals (track 4)
- Shannon Sanders – drums & producer (tracks: 4, 7)
- Akil Thompson – guitar & bass (tracks: 4, 7)
- Carolyn Wann Bailey – violin (tracks: 4, 7)
- Rod Hardman – guitar (track 8)
- Josh "Guido" Rivera – guitar & bass (tracks: 9, 11, 13)
- Eugene Russell IV – tenor saxophone (tracks: 9, 11)
- Derrick White – trombone (tracks: 9, 11)
- Ali Barr – trumpet (tracks: 9, 11)
- Bryan-Michael Cox – piano & producer (track 14)
- Todd "LT Moe" Moore – producer (tracks: 1, 6, 10, 12), co-producer (track 8), programming (tracks: 1, 6, 10), recording (tracks: 1, 5, 6, 8, 10, 12), co-executive producer
- Kwamé "K1 Mil" Holland – producer & engineering (tracks: 2, 3, 9, 11, 13), co-executive producer
- Brett Baker – producer & programming (track 5)
- Brandon Howard – producer (track 8)
- Greg Fuqua – recording & mixing (tracks: 4, 7)
- Michael Gregory – recording (tracks: 4, 7)
- Vernon Mungo – recording (tracks: 4, 7)
- Alvin Speights – mixing (tracks: 1, 6, 8, 10, 12, 14)
- A Kid Called Cus – mixing (tracks: 2, 3, 9, 11, 13)
- Gimel "Young Guru" Keaton – mixing (track 5)
- George Littlejohn – executive producer
- Russell Johnson – executive producer
- Jerrell Allen – executive producer
- Sean Marlowe – art direction
- Paul Grosso – creative direction, cover design
- James Anthony – photography
- Sean Cokes – photography
- Peter Adarkwah – project direction

== Charts ==
Chart (2014)	Peak position
US Billboard 200	149
US Top R&B/Hip-Hop Albums (Billboard)	23
US Heatseekers Albums (Billboard)	2
