= The Vault, Vol. 1 =

The Vault - Vol. 1

Compilation album by Eric Roberson
- Released: December 26, 2003; February 3, 2004 (Vol. 1.5)
- Recorded: 1999–2003
- Studios: The Blue Room (New Jersey); Touch of Jazz (Philadelphia, Pennsylvania); Night Flight
- Genres: R&B; neo-soul; soul
- Labels: Blue Erro Soul Records, Inc.
- Producers: Andre Harris; Bastiany; Dana Sorey; Eric Roberson; James Poyser; Jay Dee; Jermaine Mobley; Kev Brown; Leonard Tribbett; Osunlade; Parris Bowens; Redhead Kingpin; Soundcheck Productions; Thaddeaus Tribbett; Tye Tribbett; Vidal Davis

Eric Roberson chronology
The Esoteric Movement (2001)	The Vault - Vol. 1 (2003)	The Vault, Vol. 1.5 (2004)

The Vault, Vol. 1 is a 2003 compilation album by American R&B singer and songwriter Eric Roberson. It is Roberson's second release following his first album, The Esoteric Movement in 2001. Roberson recorded the album after renting the New York venue Sounds of Brazil (SOBs) and running his own concert series to find an audience for his music, releasing many of these songs as The Vault, Vol. 1 after a few months of performing at SOBs with other emerging artists. The compilation included songs which were eventually re-recorded by other artists such as Carl Thomas, Musiq Soulchild and Dwele, which would lead Roberson to re-release the album the following year as The Vault, Vol 1.5, with extra new songs and an altered tracklisting.

== Track listing ==
The Vault, Vol. 1
No.	Title	Writer(s)	Producer(s)	Length
1.	"She Couldn't Hear Me"	Eric Roberson; David Guppy	Redhead Kingpin	4:18
2.	"Past Paradise"	Roberson; Paris Bowens	Roberson; Bowens	4:32
3.	"Rock With You"	Roberson; Kevin Brown	Brown	4:52
4.	"Please Don't Leave Me"	Roberson; Christian Warren	Osunlade	4:14
5.	"Hold On"	Roberson; Dwayne Bastiany	Bastiany	3:40
6.	"Rain on My Parade"	Roberson; Warren	Osunlade	5:24
7.	"Rebound"	Roberson; Bowens; Tye Tribbett; Thaddaeus Tribbett	Roberson; Bowens; Tye Tribbett; Terry Tribbett	4:06
8.	"Should We Try"	Roberson; Jermaine Mobley	Mobley	4:36
9.	"One Time" (featuring Jill Scott)	Roberson; Jill Scott; Vidal Davis	Davis	3:55
10.	"When Love Calls"	Roberson; James Poyser; James Yancey	Poyser; Jay Dee	4:11
11.	"Be With You"	Roberson	Roberson	4:55

The Vault, Vol. 1.5
No.	Title	Writer(s)	Producer(s)	Length
1.	"Couldn't Hear Me"	Eric Roberson; Guppy	Redhead Kingpin	4:23
2.	"Right Back to You"	Roberson; Andre Harris; Vidal Davis	Harris; Davis	4:10
3.	"Please Don't Leave Me"	Roberson; Warren	Osunlade	4:15
4.	"Lil' Money"	Roberson; Bowens; Tye Tribbett; Thaddaeus Tribbett	Roberson; Soundcheck Productions	4:27
5.	"Def Ears"	Roberson; Dana Sorey; Thaddaeus Tribbett	Sorey; Thaddaeus Tribbett	5:37
6.	"Past Paradise"	Roberson; Bowens	Roberson; Bowens	4:19
7.	"She Ought to Know" (featuring Marsha Ambrosius)	Roberson; Marsha Ambrosius; Thaddaeus Tribbett; Sorey	Thaddaeus Tribbett; Sorey	6:28
8.	"Obstacles"	Roberson; Mobley	Mobley	4:38
9.	"Find the Way"	Roberson; Sorey; Thaddaeus Tribbett; Leonard Tribbett; Bowens	Soundcheck Productions; Roberson	5:57
10.	"Rock With You"	Roberson; Brown	Brown	5:33
11.	"Change for Me"	Roberson; Warren	Osunlade; Roberson	6:32
12.	"I Have a Song"	Roberson; Fred Rosser	Rosser	5:13
