= Music Fan First =

Studio album by Eric Roberson
- Released: August 25, 2009
- Recorded: The Blue Room; New Jersey
- Genre: R&B, Neo-soul
- Length: 75:33
- Label: Blue Erro Soul (US), Dome Records (UK)
- Producer: Brett "B-Dubb" Baker, JR Hutson, Young RJ, Osunlade, A. Jermaine Mobley, Colin Emmanuel, Curt Chambers, Dana Sorey, Eric Roberson

Eric Roberson chronology
...Left (2007)	Music Fan First (2009)	Mister Nice Guy (2011)

Music Fan First is the sixth studio album from the soul singer Eric Roberson. It was released on August 25, 2009 on his longtime independent label Blue Erro Soul and on August 24, 2009 in the UK on Dome Records.

It features his biggest radio single to date, the duet with Lalah Hathaway "Dealing". The music video was directed by the team Christopher Adams & Hana "Blaq" McDowell, who also directed the video for the song "Still". Music Fan First would be his final album recorded and released independently, until he signed with Purpose Records/E1 Music to release his seventh album Mister Nice Guy.

Music Fan First also contains the song "Celebrate" which was dedicated to the passing of singer Michael Jackson. The album was released four days from what would have been his 51st birthday.

== Track listing ==
- All songs written by Eric Roberson and Brett Baker, except as indicated.
1. The Newness
2. The Hunger (featuring W. Ellington Felton) (Eric Roberson, W. Ellington Felton, Brett Baker)
3. A Tale Of Two (featuring Ben O'Neill and Michelle Thompson) (Eric Roberson, Brett Baker, Minnie Riperton, Richard Rudolph, Leon Ware)
4. Borrow You
5. Dealing (featuring Lalah Hathaway) (Eric Roberson, Lee Hutson, Jr.)
6. Still
7. How Could She Do It
8. Further (featuring T3 of Slum Village) (Eric Roberson, R.L. Altman, Ralph Rice II, Craig Lane)
9. The Power That Kisses Hold
10. Howard Girls (featuring Geno Young, Brandon Hines and Aaron Abernathy) (Eric Roberson, Curt Chambers, Dana Sorey)
11. Weekend Getaway (Eric Roberson, A. Jermaine Mobley)
12. She (Eric Roberson, Osunlade)
13. Wanna Believe It Again (featuring Wayna) (Eric Roberson, Dana Sorey)
14. Bad for Me (Eric Roberson, Colin Emmanuel, Allan Simpson)
15. Breakitdown (Eric Roberson, A. Jermaine Mobley)
16. Pave a New Road (Eric Roberson, Curt Chambers, Brett Baker)
17. Celebrate [Bonus] (featuring Sy Smith)

== Personnel ==
- Drum programming: Brett Baker, Colin Emmanuel, A. Jermaine Mobley, Young RJ, Eric Roberson, Osunlade, JR Hutson
- Live Drums: Brett Baker
- Keyboards: Brett Baker, Colin Emmanuel, A. Jermaine Mobley, Young RJ, Dana Sorey, Osunlade, JR Hutson, Craig Lane
- Percussion: Donna Sorey
- Guitar: Ben O'Neil, Curt Chambers, Allan Simpson, A. Jermaine Mobley
- Bass: Wayne Moore, Jay Bratten
- Hammond organ: Dana Sorey
- Fender Rhodes: Curt Chambers, JR Hutson
- Trumpet: Matt Cappy
- Saxophone: Korey Riker
- Trombone: Aaron Goodie
- Executive producer: Eric Roberson, James Roberson, Charlotte Roberson
- Photography: D. Brown
- Art Direction and design: Concept

== Samples ==
- "A Tale Of Two" contains a sample of "Inside My Love", as performed by Minnie Riperton.
