= The Esoteric Movement =

Studio album by Eric Roberson
- Released: 2001
- Recorded: The Blue Room; Franklin Park, New Jersey; The Conference Room; New Jersey; The Ille; New York City
- Genre: R&B
- Length: 59:00
- Label: Blue Erro Soul
- Producer: Eric Roberson; Parris Bowens; Tye Tribbett; Dana Sorey; Keith Brown; Redhead Kingpin; Osunlade; Christopher Jennings & Eric Johnson; William Lockwood; Frank Romano

Eric Roberson chronology
The Esoteric Movement (2001)	The Vault, Vol. 1 (2003)

The Esoteric Movement is a studio album by Eric Roberson. It was released in 2001.

== Track listing ==
No.	Title	Length
1.	"Genesis"	1:28
2.	"4U"	4:52
3.	"Runaway"	5:13
4.	"Morning After"	3:36
5.	"Crazy"	5:03
6.	"Rain On My Parade"	5:48
7.	"Miles Away"	4:48
8.	"Funny Feelings"	3:58
9.	"She Went Away"	5:13
10.	"What Is Love Made Of?"	4:03
11.	"New Born Child"	5:20
12.	"Woman"	7:01
Total length:		61:23
