= O Come, O Come, Emmanuel =

Christian hymn for Advent and Christmas

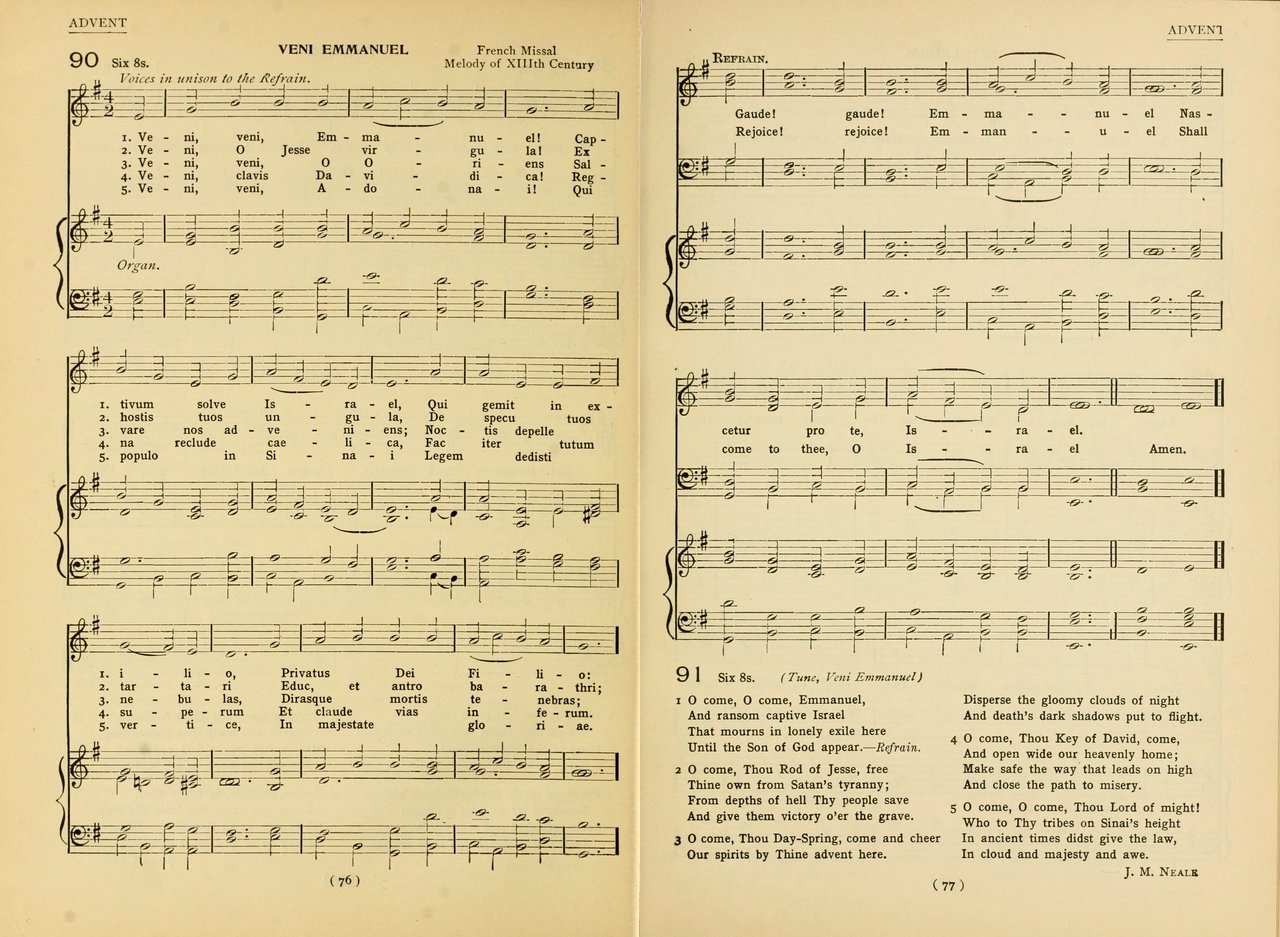
- Native name: Veni, veni, Emmanuel
- Genre: Hymn
- Written: 1851 (translated and combined with melody)
- Text: John Mason Neale, translator
- Based on: Matthew 1:23
- Meter: 8.8.8.8. (L.M.) with Refrain
- Melody: "Bone Jesu dulcis cunctis" (anon., 15th c.)

Recording
- "Veni, Veni Emmanuel", arranged by Peter Zagar for voice and cello: file; help

"O come, O come, Emmanuel" (Latin: "Veni, veni, Emmanuel") is a Christian hymn for Advent, which is also often published in books of Christmas carols. The text, originally written in Latin, is a metrical paraphrase of the O Antiphons, a series of plainchant antiphons attached to the Magnificat at Vespers over the final days before Christmas. The Latin metrical hymn "Veni, Veni, Emmanuel" first appears in print in 1710, despite claims that the text dates to the 11th or 12th century. The early medieval origins of the O Antiphons have led to a common belief that "Veni, Veni, Emmanuel" itself dates to the Early Middle Ages, but there is not enough evidence to prove that. In 1966, Mary Berry (then Mother Thomas More) discovered the tune in a 15th-century Franciscan processional (Bibliothèque National, fonds latin 10581), which was probably copied for a nunnery. However, while that tune is the same as the modern hymn, it is not known if the hymn's words were ever sung to it.

The 1851 translation by John Mason Neale from Hymns Ancient and Modern is the most prominent by far in the English-speaking world, but other English translations also exist. Translations into other modern languages (particularly German) are also in widespread use. While the text may be used with many metrical hymn tunes, it was first combined with its most famous tune, often itself called Veni Emmanuel, in the English-language Hymnal Noted in 1851. Later, the same tune was used with versions of "O come, O come, Emmanuel" in other languages, including Latin.

== Inspiration ==
The O Antiphons have their origins over 1,200 years ago in monastic life in the 8th or 9th century. Seven days before Christmas Eve monasteries would sing the "O antiphons" in anticipation of Christmas Eve when the eighth antiphon, "O Virgo virginum" ("O Virgin of virgins") would be sung before and after Mary's canticle, the Magnificat (Luke 1:46b–55).

== The Latin text ==
The words and the music of "O come, O come, Emmanuel" developed separately. The Latin text is first documented in Germany in 1710, whereas the tune most familiar in the English-speaking world has its origins in 15th-century France.

=== The five-verse Latin text ===
In spite of claims the Latin metrical hymn dates from the 11th or 12th century, it appears for the first time in the seventh edition of Psalteriolum Cantionum Catholicarum (Cologne, 1710). This hymnal was a major force in the history of German church music: first assembled by Jesuit hymnographer Johannes Heringsdorf in 1610 and receiving numerous revised editions through 1868, it achieved enormous exposure due to its use in Jesuit schools.

Each stanza of the hymn consists of a four-line verse (in 88.88 meter with an AABB rhyme scheme), paraphrasing one of the O Antiphons. There is also a new two-line refrain (again in 88 meter): "Gaude, gaude! Emmanuel / nascetur pro te, Israel", i.e., "Rejoice, Rejoice! Emmanuel will be born for you, O Israel". There are only five verses: two of the antiphons are omitted and the order of the remaining verses differs from that of the O Antiphons, most notably the last antiphon ("O Emmanuel") becomes the first verse of the hymn and gives the hymn its title of "Veni, veni, Emmanuel":

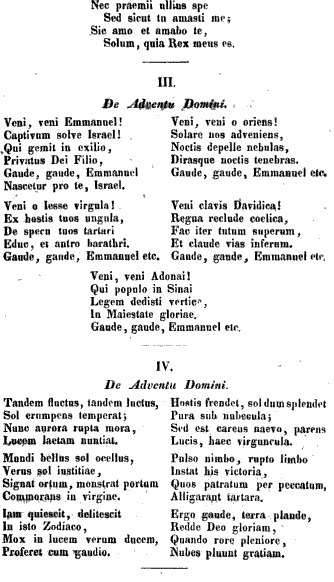
Text in Daniel, Thesaurus Hymnologicus (1844)

1. Veni, veni Emmanuel!
Captivum solve Israel!
Qui gemit in exilio,
Privatus Dei Filio. [7th antiphon]

Gaude, gaude, Emmanuel
nascetur pro te, Israel.

2. Veni o Jesse virgula!
Ex hostis tuos ungula,
De specu tuos tartari
Educ, et antro barathri. [3rd antiphon]

3. Veni, veni o Oriens!
Solare nos adveniens,
Noctis depelle nebulas,
Dirasque noctis tenebras. [5th antiphon]

4. Veni clavis Davidica!
Regna reclude coelica,
Fac iter Tutum superum,
Et claude vias Inferum. [4th antiphon]

5. Veni, veni Adonai!
Qui populo in Sinai
Legem dedisti vertice,
In maiestate gloriae. [2nd antiphon]

In 1844, the 1710 text was included in the second volume of Thesaurus Hymnologicus, a monumental collection by the German hymnologist Hermann Adalbert Daniel, thus ensuring a continued life for the Latin text even as the Psalteriolum came to the end of its long history in print.

It was from Thesaurus Hymnologicus that John Mason Neale would come to know the hymn. Neale would both publish the Latin version of the hymn in Britain and translate the first (and still most important) English versions.

=== The seven-verse Latin text ===
The 1710 text was published in Joseph Hermann Mohr's Cantiones Sacrae of 1878, with two additional verses of unknown authorship paraphrasing the two "missing" O Antiphons. The order of verses now followed that of the antiphons (beginning with "Sapientia" and ending with "Emmanuel"), and accordingly the hymn's title in this hymnal was "Veni, O Sapientia". The refrain had undergone a slight change and was now "Gaude, gaude, O Israel. Mox veniet Emmanuel", i.e. "Rejoice, rejoice, o Israel. Soon shall come Emmanuel".

1. Veni, O Sapientia,
Quae hic disponis omnia,
Veni, viam prudentiae
Ut doceas et gloriae.

Gaude, gaude, o Israel.
Mox veniet Emmanuel.

2. Veni, veni Adonai ...

3. Veni, o Jesse virgula ...

4. Veni, clavis Davidica ...

5. Veni, veni, o Oriens ...

6. Veni, Veni, Rex Gentium,
Veni, Redemptor omnium,
Ut salves tuos famulos
Peccati sibi conscios.

7. Veni, veni, Emmanuel ...

== English versions of the text ==
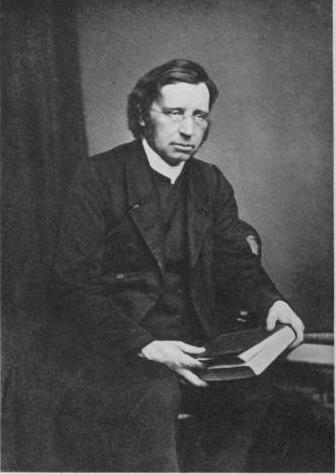
John Mason Neale

John Mason Neale published the five-verse Latin version, which he had presumably learned from Daniels' Thesaurus Hymnologicus, in his 1851 collection Hymni Ecclesiae.

In the same year, Neale published the first documented English translation, beginning with "Draw nigh, draw nigh, Emmanuel", in Mediæval Hymns and Sequences. He revised this version for The Hymnal Noted, followed by a further revision, in 1861, for Hymns Ancient and Modern. This version, now with the initial line reading "O come, O come, Emmanuel", would attain hegemony in the English-speaking world (aside from minor variations from hymnal to hymnal).

Thomas Alexander Lacey (1853–1931) created a new translation (also based on the five-verse version) for The English Hymnal in 1906, but it received only limited use.

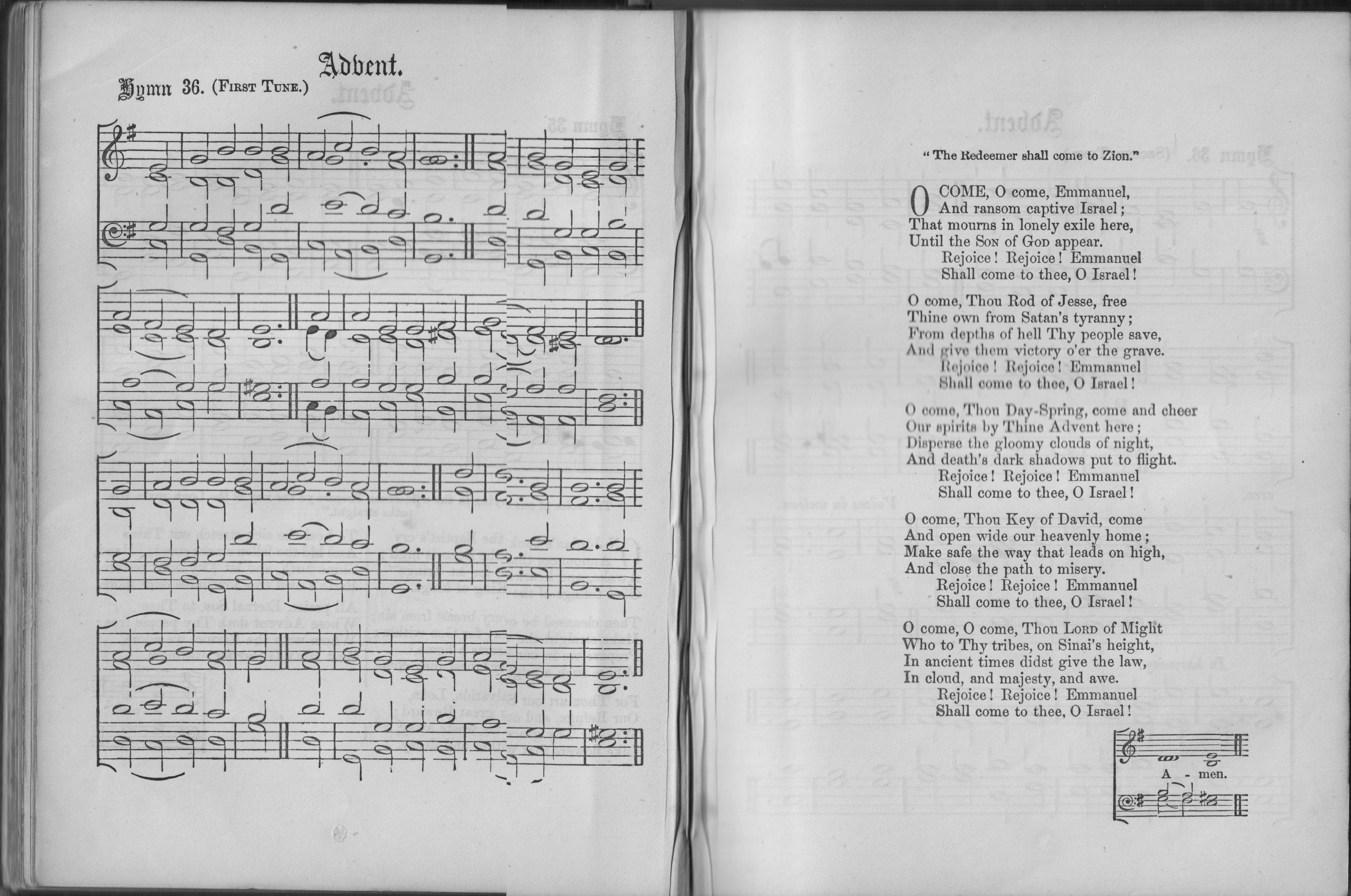
The hymn in the 1861 edition of Hymns Ancient and Modern

It would take until the 20th century for the additional two stanzas to receive significant English translations. The translation published by Henry Sloane Coffin in 1916 – which included only the "O Come, O Come Emmanuel" verse by Neale and Coffin's two "new" verses – gained the broadest acceptance, with occasional modifications.

A full seven-verse English version officially appeared for the first time in 1940, in the Hymnal of the Episcopal Church.

Contemporary English hymnals print various versions ranging from four to eight verses. The version included in the Hymnal 1982 of the Episcopal Church is typical: there are eight stanzas, with "Emmanuel" as both the first and the last stanza. From this version, six lines date from the original 1851 translation by Neale, nine from the version from Hymns Ancient and Modern (1861), eleven (including the two supplementary stanzas, following Coffin) from the Hymnal 1940, and the first two lines of the fourth stanza ("O come, thou Branch of Jesse's tree, \ free them from Satan's tyranny") are unique to this hymnal.

=== Texts of the major English translations ===
J. M. Neale (1851)

Draw nigh, draw nigh, Emmanuel,
And ransom captive Israel,
That mourns in lonely exile here,
Until the Son of God appear;
Rejoice! rejoice! Emmanuel
Shall be born for thee, O Israel!

Draw nigh, O Jesse's Rod, draw nigh,
To free us from the enemy;
From Hell's infernal pit to save,
And give us victory o'er the grave.
Rejoice! rejoice! Emmanuel
Shall be born, for thee, O Israel!

Draw nigh, Thou Orient, Who shalt cheer
And comfort by Thine Advent here,
And banish far the brooding gloom
Of sinful night and endless doom.
Rejoice! rejoice! Emmanuel
Shall be born for thee, O Israel!

Draw nigh, draw nigh, O David's Key,
The Heavenly Gate will ope to Thee;
Make safe the way that leads on high,
And close the path to misery.
Rejoice! rejoice! Emmanuel
Shall be born for thee, O Israel!

Draw nigh, draw nigh, O Lord of Might,
Who to Thy tribes from Sinai's height
In ancient time didst give the Law,
In cloud and majesty and awe.
Rejoice! rejoice! Emmanuel
Shall be born for thee, O Israel!

Hymns Ancient and Modern (1861)

O come, O come, Emmanuel,
And ransom captive Israel;
That mourns in lonely exile here,
Until the Son of God appear.
Rejoice! Rejoice! Emmanuel
Shall come to thee, O Israel.

O come, Thou Rod of Jesse, free
Thine own from Satan's tyranny;
From depths of hell Thy people save,
And give them victory o'er the grave.
Rejoice! Rejoice! Emmanuel
Shall come to thee, O Israel.

O come, Thou Day-Spring, come and cheer
Our Spirits by Thine Advent here;
Disperse the gloomy clouds of night,
And death's dark shadows put to flight.
Rejoice! Rejoice! Emmanuel
Shall come to thee, O Israel.

O come, Thou Key of David, come
And open wide our heavenly home;
Make safe the way that leads on high,
And close the path to misery.
Rejoice! Rejoice! Emmanuel
Shall come to thee, O Israel.

O come, O come, thou Lord of Might
Who to Thy tribes, on Sinai's height,
In ancient times didst give the law,
In cloud, and majesty, and awe.
Rejoice! Rejoice! Emmanuel
Shall come to thee, O Israel.

T. A. Lacey (1906)

O come, O come, Emmanuel!
Redeem thy captive Israel
That into exile drear is gone,
Far from the face of God's dear Son.
Rejoice! Rejoice! Emmanuel
Shall come to thee, O Israel.

O come, thou Branch of Jesse! draw
The quarry from the lion's claw;
From the dread caverns of the grave,
From nether hell, thy people save.
Rejoice! Rejoice! Emmanuel
Shall come to thee, O Israel.

O come, O come, thou Dayspring bright!
Pour on our souls thy healing light;
Dispel the long night's lingering gloom,
And pierce the shadows of the tomb.
Rejoice! Rejoice! Emmanuel
Shall come to thee, O Israel.

O Come, thou Lord of David’s Key!
The royal door fling wide and free;
Safeguard for us the heavenward road,
And bar the way to death's abode.
Rejoice! Rejoice! Emmanuel
Shall come to thee, O Israel.

O come, O come, Adonai,
Who in thy glorious majesty
From that high mountain clothed in awe,
Gavest thy folk the elder Law.
Rejoice! Rejoice! Emmanuel
Shall come to thee, O Israel.

Additional verses trans. H. S. Coffin (1916)

O come, Thou Wisdom from on high,
And order all things, far and nigh;
To us the path of knowledge show,
And cause us in her ways to go.
Rejoice! Rejoice! Emmanuel
Shall come to thee, O Israel.

O come, Desire of nations, bind
All peoples in one heart and mind;
Bid envy, strife and quarrels cease;
Fill the whole world with heaven’s peace.
Rejoice! Rejoice! Emmanuel
Shall come to thee, O Israel.

== The music ==
Because "O Come, O Come Emmanuel" is a metrical hymn in the common 88.88.88 meter scheme (in some hymnals given as "8.8.8.8 and refrain"), it is possible to pair the words of the hymn with any number of tunes. The meter is shared between the original Latin text and the English translation.

However, at least in the English-speaking world, "O Come, O Come Emmanuel" is associated with one tune more than any other, to the extent that the tune itself is often called Veni Emmanuel.

=== The "Veni Emmanuel" tune ===
The familiar tune called "Veni Emmanuel" was first linked with this hymn in 1851, when Thomas Helmore published it in the Hymnal Noted, paired with an early revision of Neale's English translation of the text. The volume listed the tune as being "From a French Missal in the National Library, Lisbon." However, Helmore provided no means by which to verify his source, leading to long-lasting doubts about its attribution. There was even speculation that Helmore might have composed the melody himself.

The mystery was settled in 1966 by British musicologist Mary Berry (also an Augustinian canoness and noted choral conductor), who discovered a 15th-century manuscript containing the melody in the National Library of France. The manuscript consists of processional chants for burials. The melody used by Helmore is found here with the text "Bone Jesu dulcis cunctis" [O good Jesus, altogether sweet]; it is part of a series of two-part tropes to the responsory Libera me.

As Berry (writing under her name in religion, Mother Thomas More) points out in her article on the discovery, "Whether this particular manuscript was the actual source to which [Helmore] referred we cannot tell at present." (Recall that Hymnal Noted referred to Lisbon, not Paris, and to a missal, not a processional.) Berry raised the possibility that there might exist "an even earlier version of" the melody. However, there is no evidence to suggest that this tune was connected with this hymn before Helmore's hymnal; thus, the two would have first come together in English. Nonetheless, because of the nature of metrical hymns, it is perfectly possible to pair this tune with the Latin text; versions doing so exist by Zoltán Kodály, Philip Lawson and Jan Åke Hillerud, among others.

In the German language, Das katholische Gesangbuch der Schweiz ("The Catholic Hymnal of Switzerland") and Gesangbuch der Evangelisch-reformierten Kirchen der deutschsprachigen Schweiz ("The Hymnal of the Evangelical-Reformed Churches of German-speaking Switzerland"), both published in 1998, adapt a version of the text by Henry Bone that usually lacks a refrain to use it with this melody.

=== Rise to hegemony ===
The pairing of the hymn text with the Veni Emmanuel tune was proved an extremely significant combination. The hymn text was embraced both out of a Romantic interest in poetic beauty and medieval exoticism and out of a concern for matching hymns to liturgical seasons and functions rooted in the Oxford Movement in the Church of England. The Hymnal Noted, in which the words and tune were first combined, represented the "extreme point" of these forces. This hymnal "consisted entirely of versions of Latin hymns, designed for use as Office hymns within the Anglican Church despite the fact that Office hymns had no part in the authorized liturgy. The music was drawn chiefly from plainchant", as was the case with the Veni Emmanuel tune for "O Come, O Come Emmanuel", the combination of which has been cited as an exemplar of this new style of hymnody.

"O Come, O Come Emmanuel" was thus ideally situated to benefit from the cultural forces that would bring about Hymns Ancient and Modern in 1861. This new hymnal was a product of the same ideological forces that paired it with the Veni Emmanuel tune, ensuring its inclusion, but was also designed to achieve commercial success beyond any one party of churchmanship, incorporating high-quality hymns of all ideological approaches.

The volume succeeded wildly; by 1895, Hymns Ancient and Modern was being used in three-quarters of English churches. The book "probably did more than anything else to spread the ideas of the Oxford Movement" (which include the aesthetics of "O Come, O Come Emmanuel") "so widely that many of them became imperceptibly a part of the tradition of the Church as a whole." Its musical qualities in particular "became an influence far beyond the boundaries of the Church of England." It is very reflective of these cultural forces that the form of "O Come, O Come Emmanuel" in Hymns Ancient and Modern remains predominant in the English-speaking world. (This predominance encompasses not just the Veni Emmanuel tune, but also the revised English translation that included, for example, the title used in this article – see the section English versions below.)

=== Other tunes ===
While the "Veni Emmanuel" tune predominates in the English-speaking world, several others have been closely associated with the hymn.

In the United States, some Lutheran hymnals use the tune "St. Petersburg" by Dmitry Bortniansky for "O Come, O Come, Emmanuel." A Moravian hymnal from the US gives a tune attributed to Charles Gounod.

Alternative tunes are particularly common in the German-speaking world, where the text of the hymn originated, especially as the hymn was in use there for many years before Helmore's connection of it to the "Veni Emmanuel" tune became known.

Among several German paraphrases of the hymn, one is attributed to Christoph Bernhard Verspoell – one of the earliest and most influential to arise around the late-18th/early-19th century. It is associated with its own distinctive tune, which has enjoyed exceptionally long-lasting popularity in the Diocese of Münster.

A more faithful German translation by Heinrich Bone became the vehicle for a tune from JBC Schmidts' Sammlung von Kirchengesängen für katholische Gymnasien (Düsseldorf 1836), which remains popular in German diocesan song-books and regional editions of the common hymnal Gotteslob. This melody was carried across the Atlantic by Johann Baptist Singenberger, where it remains in use through the present in some Catholic communities in the United States.

The Archdiocese of Cologne's supplement to Gotteslob (#829) includes a tune by CF Ackens (Aachen, 1841) with the Bone translation. A version by Bone without a refrain is commonly connected with a tune from the Andernacher Gesangbuch (Cologne, 1608), but it can also be used with the melody of the medieval Latin hymn Conditor alme siderum, further demonstrating the flexibility of metrical hymnody.

== Musical influence ==
- Ottorino Respighi quotes the melody in "The Gift of the Magi" in his Trittico Botticelliano (1927).
- Zoltán Kodály wrote a choral work "Adventi ének (Advent song: Veni, veni Emmanuel)" in 1943 based on the melody and sung mostly with Latin or Hungarian lyrics.
- Samuel Barber quotes the melody in his Die natali, Op. 37 (1960).
- George Dyson's 1949 Concerto da Chiesa uses the theme as a basis for the first movement.
- American composer John Davison quotes the melody in the third movement of his Sonata for Trombone and Piano (1957).
- The composer James MacMillan wrote a percussion concerto, Veni, Veni, Emmanuel, based on this carol in 1991, premiered during the 1992 BBC Proms.
- Included on American singer-songwriter Sufjan Stevens' 2006 album Songs for Christmas.
- U2's song "White as Snow" from its 2009 release No Line on the Horizon takes its tune directly from the hymn.
- The 2000 charity album It's a Cool Cool Christmas features a version by the Scottish band Belle and Sebastian.
- A short version of this song appears on Halford's 2019 album Halford III: Winter Songs as the third track.
- World fusion artist Scott Jeffers Traveler recorded a dramatic vocal performance woven into Middle Eastern and progressive raga instrumentation on his Old World Christmas album in 2011.
- Punch Brothers released a cover version on the 2012 compilation album Holidays Rule.
- Kelly Clarkson included the song as a deluxe track on her Christmas album Wrapped in Red (2013).
- Punk rock band Bad Religion recorded an upbeat version of the song for inclusion on their 2013 album Christmas Songs.
- Finnish soprano Tarja Turunen included the song in her classical album From Spirits and Ghosts (Score for a Dark Christmas) (6 October 2017).
- Australian Christian-rock band For King & Country featured the song on their live album, Christmas: Live from Phoenix (2017), as well a studio version featuring Needtobreathe on their album A Drummer Boy Christmas (2020).
- Enya released a cover in English and Latin for her seventh studio album And Winter Came... (2008)
- Loreena McKennitt included a cover on her seasonal eighth studio album A Midwinter Night's Dream (2008)
- Blackmore's Night included a version on their 2006 studio album Winter Carols.
- Christian rock band, Skillet, released a cover as a single similarly entitled "O Come, O Come Emmanuel" in 2025.

== See also ==
- List of Christmas carols
