= A Love Story (Vivian Green album) =

Studio album by Vivian Green
- Released: November 12, 2002
- Recorded: Various: Axis Studio (Philadelphia, Pennsylvania); The Studio (Philadelphia, Pennsylvania); The Blue Room (New Jersey); Electric Lady Studios (New York City); The West Stable (West Chester, Pennsylvania)
- Genre: R&B
- Length: 57:42
- Label: Columbia
- Producer: Anthony Bell; Junius Bervine; Durrell Bottoms; Vivian Green; Jamar Jones; Fred Kenney; Osunlade; Thaddeus Tribbett II

Vivian Green chronology
A Love Story (2002)	Vivian (2005)

Singles from A Love Story
- 1. "Emotional Rollercoaster" Released: October 15, 2002; 2. "Fanatic" Released: March 15, 2003; 3. "What Is Love?" Released: 2003

A Love Story is the debut studio album by American singer Vivian Green. It was released by Columbia Records on November 12, 2002 in the United States. Green worked with a variety of producers on the album, including Anthony Bell, Junius Bervine, Durrell Bottoms, Jamar Jones, Fred Kenney, Osunlade, and Thaddeus Tribbett II. The album debuted at 93 on the US Billboard 200 in December 2002 and later peaked at number 51, also reaching number 13 on the Top R&B/Hip-Hop Albums chart. It was eventually certified gold by the Recording Industry Association of America.

Received to mixed reviews from music critics, A Love Story garnered Green three Lady of Soul Awards nominations for Best Solo R&B/Soul Single ("Emotional Rollercoaster"), Best Solo R&B/Soul Album of the Year, and Best Solo R&B/Solo or Rap New Artist, also earning a BET Award nomination for Best R&B Female Artist: The album spawned three singles including the US Billboard Hot 100 top 40 hit "Emotional Rollercoaster"; the Fred Kenney-produced "Fanatic" and the Osunlade-produced "What Is Love?".

In 2020, during an interview about her seventh album Love Absolute, Green revealed A Love Story was her least favorite album - despite being well received by her fans.

== Critical reception ==
Professional ratings
Review scores
Source	Rating
AllMusic	3/5 stars
Blender	2/5 stars
Rolling Stone	3/5 stars
USA Today	3/4 stars

Jack Smith from BBC Music called the album "a stunning and sublime debut." He wrote that A Love Story "is an inspired blend of seductive neo-soul coupled with a vocal maturity and emotional range of a young woman who's seen lifes up-and-downs." Allmusic editor William Ruhlmann wrote that "a group of producers provide familiar instrumental beds to support those sentiments, nothing that hasn't been heard before [...] Maybe consumers are ready to accept yet another singer in this style, but even so, on her debut album, Green is far from the most compelling of the group." Billboard declared the album a "properly titled" set on which "at times, Green attempts to do too much."

Christian Hoard and Jon Caramanica, writing for Rolling Stone, felt that "the debut from the sexy, dulcet-voiced twenty-three-year-old is all about neosoul politesse – hip-hop-flavored and vaguely jazzy. Very good if that's your thing, but tofu-bland otherwise." PopMatters critic J. Victoria Sanders remarked that "up-tempo is not Green's forte for a number of reasons. Mostly because her voice has more jazz in it than hip-hop, and she doesn't do well posing [...] Vivian Green's voice makes this journey through her heartbreak hotel worth the tour, but at the end of her girl meets boy story there's just too much left out of A Love Story to make it noteworthy."

== Chart performance ==
A Love Story debuted at number 93 on the US Billboard 200 in December 2002. The album later peaked at number 51 on the same chart and reached number 18 on Billboard''s Top R&B/Hip Hop Albums chart for the week ending March 1, 2003. The album was certified gold by Recording Industry Association of America (RIAA) on May 6, 2003, indicating sales in excess of 500,000 copies, and stayed on the Billboard 200 chart for 27 consecutive weeks. A Love Story has sold over 531,000 copies in the US alone, according to Nielsen Soundscan.

The first single from the album, "Emotional Rollercoaster", peaked at number 39 on the US Billboard Hot 100 and at number 13 on the Hot R&B/Hip-Hop Songs chart. The song also went to number 1 on the Dance Club Songs chart. Second single "Fanatic" peaked at number 52 on the Hot R&B/Hip-Hop Songs chart, while third single "What Is Love?" also appeared on the Hot R&B/Hip-Hop Songs chart, reaching number 75.

== Track listing ==
No.	Title	Writer(s)	Producer(s)	Length
1.	"Wishful Thinking"	Vivian Green; Junius Bervine	Bervine	4:04
2.	"24 Hour Blue (Just One of Those Days)"	Green; Bervine	Bervine	3:52
3.	"Superwoman"	Green; Bervine	Bervine	4:17
4.	"What Is Love?"	Green; Eric Roberson; Osunlade; Joseph Sample	Osunlade	5:09
5.	"Music"	Green; Thaddeus Tribbett II; Parris Bowens II	Tribbett; Bowens	4:04
6.	"Emotional Rollercoaster"	Green; Roberson; Osunlade	Bervine	3:16
7.	"Final Hour"	Green; Jamar Jones	Durell Bottoms; Jones	2:39
8.	"No Sittin' By the Phone"	Green; Tribbett; Bowens	Tribbett; Bowens	4:41
9.	"Affected"	Green; Anthony Bell; Benjamin Kenney; Christopher Shar	Bell	3:07
10.	"Fanatic"	Green; Fred Kenney	Kenney; Green	4:12
11.	"Ain't Nothing But Love"	Green; Bell; Roberson; James Poyser	Bell; Green	3:38
12.	"Be Good to You"	Green; Bervine	Bervine	4:19
13.	"Complete"	Green; Bell; Isaac Hayes	Bell	4:07
14.	"Keep on Going"	Green; Kenney; Jeff Bradshaw; Bowens; Timothy Day	Kenney; Tribbett	6:07

Sample credits

- "What Is Love?" contains replayes elements from "It Happens Everyday" as performed by Joe Sample.
- "Complete" contains replayed elements from "A Few More Kisses to Go" as performed by Isaac Hayes.

== Personnel ==
- Terence J. Price -Keyboards background vocals, Producer (addicted)
- Davis A. Barnett – Viola
- Diane Barnett – Violin
- Lynne Beiler – Cello
- Anthony Bell – Keyboards, Producer, Engineer, Instrumentation
- Damen Bennett – Flute
- Junius Bervine – Keyboards, Vocals (background), Producer, String Arrangements, Instrumentation
- Durrell Bottoms – Producer, Engineer
- Jeff Bradshaw – Trombone
- Alice Butts – Art Direction, Design
- Thom Cadley – Surround Mix
- Chauncey Childs – Executive Producer
- Timothy Day – Guitar, Engineer
- Omar Edwards – Organ
- Russell Elevado – Mixing
- Michael Fossenkemper – Mixing
- Larry Gold – String Arrangements
- Vivian Green – Vocals (background), Producer
- Stephen Groat – Bass
- Derrick Hodge – Bass
- Jamar Jones – Piano, Producer
- Ben Kenney – Guitar
- Fred Kenney – Programming, Producer
- Olga Konopelsky – Violin
- Charlene Kwas – Violin
- Oliver Gene Lake Jr. – Drums
- Alexandra Leem – Viola
- Jennie Lorenzo – Cello
- Jonathan Maron – Bass
- Carlos "Storm" Martinez – Engineer
- George "Spanky" McCurdy – Drums
- Shinobu Mitsuoka – Mixing Assistant
- Ryan Moys – Engineer
- Osunlade – Producer, Instrumentation
- Pino Palladino – Bass
- Kevin Patrick – A&R
- Federico Gonzalez Peña – Keyboards
- Bill Phelps – Photography
- Isaac Phillips – Guitar
- James Poyser – Percussion, Drums, Keyboards
- Tony Prendatt – Engineer, Mixing
- Darcy Proper – Surround Mix
- Eric Roberson – Vocals (background), Engineer
- "Little" John Roberts – Drums
- Frank Romano – Guitar
- Erik Sayles – Guitar (Acoustic), Guitar
- David Schneider – Oboe
- Clayton Sears – Guitar
- Chris Stevens – Trumpet
- Igor Szwec – Violin
- Gregory Teperman – Violin
- Alex Theoret – Mixing Assistant
- Eric Tribbett – Drums, Producer
- Thaddeus T. Tribbett – Bass
- Tye Tribbett – Piano, Keyboards, Producer, Instrumentation
- Steef Van De Gevel – Mixing Assistant

== Charts ==
=== Weekly charts ===
Chart (2002)	Peak position
US Billboard 200	51
US Top R&B/Hip-Hop Albums (Billboard)	13

=== Year-end charts ===
Chart (2003)	Position
US Billboard 200	200
US Top R&B/Hip-Hop Albums (Billboard)	42

== Certifications ==
Region	Certification	Certified units/sales
United States (RIAA)	Gold	500,000^{^}
^{^} Shipments figures based on certification alone.
