= Turn da Lights Off =

2004 single by Tweet

Single by Tweet featuring Missy Elliott

from the album It's Me Again
- Released: October 5, 2004
- Recorded: 2004
- Studio: Audio Vision (North Miami, Florida); The Hit Factory Criteria (Miami, Florida)
- Genre: R&B; hip hop
- Length: 4:55
- Label: The Goldmind; Atlantic
- Songwriters: Missy Elliott; Kwamé Holland; Edgar DeLange; Emil Newman; Herbert Spencer; Marvin Gaye
- Producers: Missy "Misdemeanor" Elliott; Kwamé "K1Mil"

Tweet singles chronology
"Thugman" (2003)	"Turn da Lights Off" (2004)	"Love Again" (2009)

Missy Elliott singles chronology
"Car Wash" (2004)	"Turn da Lights Off" (2004)	"1, 2 Step" (2004)

Audio video
- "Turn da Lights Off" on YouTube

"Turn da Lights Off" is a song by American singer Tweet from her second studio album, It's Me Again (2005). It features guest vocals from American rapper Missy Elliott, who co-wrote and co-produced the song with Kwamé. The song was released on October 5, 2004, as the album's lead single. "Turn da Lights Off" contains a sample of Nat King Cole's "Lost April" and portions of Marvin Gaye and Tammi Terrell's "If This World Were Mine".

== Background ==
Proposals for the It's Me Again lead single dates back to early 2004, where MTV reported that the Missy Elliott-produced "Shook Up", featuring rapper and former 106 & Park co-host Free, was in consideration for a lead single choice. However, complications from the merging between Elektra Records and Atlantic prevented the song's release, resulting in the song's cancellation and a pushback date for Tweet's It's Me Again album. On October 5, 2004, "Turn da Lights Off" was released and began to appear on numerous mixtapes to help spread the word of the song's release. A promotional remix featuring 50 Cent and an alternate line by Elliott was also released to mixtapes in order to generate further buzz for the single.

== Critical reception ==
The song met generally mixed to favorable reviews. Shaheem Reid of MTV's Mixtape Monday complimented the track for its guest production by rapper Kwamé. Reid also praised Missy Elliott for her vocals and opening line, "we gonna take it back like polka dots", for its reminiscent-throwback feel of "a fly era".

By contrast, Andy Kellman of AllMusic criticized Elliott's vocals, stating that her "berserk squawks vandalize[d]" Tweet's "return single". On a lighter note, Kellman did favor Elliott's production for the single, in which he felt it was reminiscent of her other produced-single, "So Gone" by Monica. Kellman had also listed "Turn da Lights Off" as a "Song Pick", where it was cited as the "most representative" of the It's Me Again album.

== Music video ==
The music video for "Turn da Lights Off", alongside a "Makes a Video" special, premiered on MTV2 on January 11, 2005 and was directed by Antti J. The video begins with Elliott portraying a DJ while scratching on a vinyl record and performing her adlibs. The video then cuts to Tweet posing for camera shots in construction for her It's Me Again album booklet. Throughout the video, Tweet is either seen getting a makeover or posing for other various camera shots. Elliott is shown again, where she begins to perform her rap while sitting on a couch behind Tweet's photo shoot or reprising her role as the DJ. The video then cuts back to Tweet posing for more camera shots while lip-syncing to the song.

== Track listings ==
- US 12-inch single

A1. "Turn da Lights Off" (radio edit) – 4:15
A2. "Turn da Lights Off" (instrumental) – 5:13
B1. "Turn da Lights Off" (album version) – 4:55
B2. "Turn da Lights Off" (acapella) – 4:42

- UK CD single
1. "Turn da Lights Off" (radio edit) – 3:39
2. "Boogie 2nite" (Seamus Haji Boogie Mix) – 5:51
- German CD maxi single
1. "Turn da Lights Off" (radio edit) – 4:14
2. "Boogie 2nite" (Seamus Haji Boogie Mix) – 5:51
3. "Turn da Lights Off" (remix) – 3:27
- UK and German 12-inch single

A1. "Turn da Lights Off" (album version) (featuring Missy Elliott) – 4:55
A2. "Turn da Lights Off" (remix) – 3:27
B1. "Turn da Lights Off" (instrumental) – 5:13
B2. "Boogie 2nite" (Seamus Haji Boogie Mix) – 5:51

== Credits and personnel ==
Credits adapted from the liner notes of It's Me Again.

- Tweet – vocals
- Marcella Araica – assistant tracking engineering
- Carlos Bedoya – additional recording
- Jimmy Douglass – mixing
- Missy Elliott – production, songwriting, vocals
- Kwamé "K1Mil" – production, songwriting
- Patrick Magee – mixing assistance
- Herb Powers, Jr. – mastering
- Mike Rivera – recording

== Charts ==
Chart (2005)	Peak position
Finland (Suomen virallinen lista)	20
Scottish Singles Sales (Official Charts)	63
UK Singles (Official Charts)	29
US Bubbling Under Hot 100 (Billboard)	8
US Hot R&B/Hip-Hop Songs (Billboard)	39

== Release history ==
Region	Date	Format(s)	Label(s)	Ref.
United States	October 5, 2004	12-inch single	The Goldmind; Atlantic	
Various	November 9, 2004	Digital download	Atlantic	
United States	January 18, 2005	Rhythmic radio	The Goldmind; Atlantic	
United Kingdom	March 7, 2005	CD single; 12-inch single	Atlantic	
Germany	March 18, 2005	CD maxi single	Warner	
Germany	May 30, 2005	12-inch single	Warner	
