= A Day in the Life: A Pokadelick Adventure =

Studio album by Kwamé
- Released: May 22, 1990
- Genre: Hip-hop, teen rap
- Label: Atlantic
- Producer: Kwamé, the Brothers Grimm

Kwamé chronology
Kwamé the Boy Genius: Featuring a New Beginning (1989)	A Day in the Life: A Pokadelick Adventure (1990)	Nastee (1992)

A Day in the Life: A Pokadelick Adventure is the second album by the American musician Kwamé, released on May 22, 1990. He is credited with his group, a New Beginning. The first single was "Ownlee Eue". The album peaked at No. 113 on the Billboard 200. Kwamé supported it with a North American tour.

== Production ==
Kwamé intended A Day in the Life: A Pokadelick Adventure to be hip-hop's first concept album; he described his world as the "Bone Age". It covers two days in Kwamé's life, with each track beginning with a snippet of one of his answering machine messages. Kwamé made little use of sampling, preferring to play many of the instruments on the tracks. The album title refers to Kwamé's penchant for wearing polka dots.

== Critical reception ==
Professional ratings
Review scores
Source	Rating
All Music Guide to Hip-hop	5/5 stars
Chicago Tribune	2/4 stars
The Encyclopedia of Popular Music	4/5 stars
Los Angeles Times	3/5 stars
RapReviews	8/10
Reno Gazette-Journal	2.5/5 stars

The Los Angeles Times said, "Seemingly hellbent on being this year's De La Soul, Kwame has a calculatingly quirky delivery that's largely hit-and-miss for most of this album". The Chicago Tribune opined that the album "offers no evidence that he will rise out of mediocrity to take a place among hip hop's creative elite." The Reno Gazette-Journal labeled it "teeny-rap", similar to the music of DJ Jazzy Jeff & the Fresh Prince. The Boston Globe said that Kwamé "has a good rhythmic delivery, but little verbal dexterity—he uses fundamental rhymes that quickly wear thin."

The Trouser Press Record Guide called A Day in the Life: A Pokadelick Adventure "a colorful and musically diverse self-willed world of polka-dots in the freewheeling 'Bone Age'."

== Track listing ==
Prologue

1. "Da' Man" – 4:15
2. "Skinee Muva" – 4:44
3. "Yes Yes Yall" – 4:27

Intro 1

4. "A Day in the Life" – 4:12
5. "Itz Oh Kay" – 4:04
6. "Therez a Partee Goinz On" – 4:53
7. "Oneovdabigboiz" – 4:45

Intro 2

8. "Hai ♥" – 4:02

Intro 3

9. "Whoz Dat Guy" – 4:18
10. "Doin' Ma Thang" – 3:42

Epilogue

11. "Ownlee Eue" – 5:20
12. "Ownlee Eue" (Reprise) – 2:19
