= The Green Room (Vivian Green album) =

Studio album by Vivian Green
- Released: October 9, 2012
- Genre: R&B; pop
- Label: E1
- Producer: Vivian Green (exec.); Kevin Patrick (exec.); Vidal Davis (also assoc.); Adam Blackstone; Brian Culbertson; J-vibe; Steven McKie; Phoe Notes; Rex Rideout

Vivian Green chronology
Beautiful (2010)	The Green Room (2012)	Vivid (2015)

The Green Room is the fourth studio album by American recording artist Vivian Green. It was released by E1 Music on October 9, 2012, in the United States. The album reached the top twenty on Billboard's Top R&B/Hip-Hop Albums chart.

== Track listing ==
The Green Room – Standard edition
No.	Title	Writer(s)	Producer(s)	Length
1.	"Remedy"	Vivian Green; Solomon Green; Phillip Randolph	Phoe Notes	3:34
2.	"Anything Out There"	Vidal Davis; Guordan Banks; Jessyca Wilson	Davis	4:20
3.	"X" (featuring Freeway)	V. Green; Randolph; Leslie Pridgen	Phoe Notes	3:54
4.	"Free as a Bird"	V. Green; S. Green; Pete Kuzma; Steven Wadell McKie	McKie	3:32
5.	"I'm Not Prepared"	Davis; Banks; Francis Ayden George	Davis	3:20
6.	"Forever"	V. Green; Jason Farmer	J-vibe	3:42
7.	"Supposed to Be Mine"	V. Green; McKie; CJ Branch	McKie	4:09
8.	"When Can I See You Again"	V. Green; S. Green; Corey Bernhard; McKie	McKie	3:55
9.	"Still Here" (featuring Brian Culbertson)	V. Green; Rex Rideout; Culbertson	Rideout; Culbertson	4:06
10.	"Heaven"	V. Green; Randolph	Phoe Notes	3:57
11.	"Faith"	V. Green; Adam Blackstone	Blackstone	3:52
12.	"Light the Universe" (featuring Algebra Blessett, Laurin Talese, Leah Smith & Treena Ferebee)	V. Green; Blessett; Blackstone	Blackstone	5:55

== Charts ==
Chart (2012)	Peak position
US Billboard 200	169
US Top R&B/Hip-Hop Albums (Billboard)	20
