= Kwamé the Boy Genius: Featuring a New Beginning =

Studio album by Kwamé
- Released: January 31, 1989
- Recorded: 1988
- Studios: Bayside Sound (Queens, New York)
- Genre: Hip hop
- Length: 35:28
- Label: Atlantic
- Producers: Hurby "Luv Bug" Azor; the Invincibles

Kwamé chronology
Kwamé the Boy Genius: Featuring a New Beginning (1989)	A Day in the Life: A Pokadelick Adventure (1990)

Singles from Kwamé the Boy Genius: Featuring a New Beginning
- 1. "The Man We All Know and Love" Released: 1989; 2. "The Rhythm" Released: 1989; 3. "U Gotz 2 Get Down" Released: 1989; 4. "Sweet Thing" Released: 1990

Kwamé the Boy Genius: Featuring a New Beginning is the debut studio album by American hip hop musician Kwamé. It was released on January 31, 1989, on Atlantic Records. It peaked at 114 on the U.S. Billboard 200 and reached the thirteenth spot on the R&B Albums chart.

== Critical reception ==
Professional ratings
Review scores
Source	Rating
AllMusic	4.5/5 stars

Steve Huey at AllMusic called the album's production "bright, appealing, and funky," and remarked that Kwamé himself was "a sorely neglected figure today, even among fans of playful, intellectual hip-hop."

== Track listing ==
No.	Title	Music	Length
1.	"Boy Genius"	Fingerprints, Holland	4:13
2.	"U Gotz 2 Get Down!"	Dale, Holland	4:44
3.	"The Rhythm"	Kwamé	3:51
4.	"The Man We All Know and Love"	Holland	6:20
5.	"The Mic Is Mine"	Holland	3:49
6.	"Keep On Doin' (What You're Doin' Baby)"	Brown, Byrd, Martin, Wesly	4:19
7.	"Push the Panic Button!!!"	Holland	3:59
8.	"Sweet Thing"	Khan, Maiden	4:35

== Chart history ==
=== Album ===
Chart (1989)	Peak position
U.S. Billboard 200	114
U.S. R&B Albums	13

=== Singles ===
Year	Single	Peak chart positions	
Year	Single	U.S. Hot R&B/Hip-Hop Singles & Tracks	U.S. Hot Rap Singles
1989	"The Man We All Know and Love"	33	2
1989	"The Rhythm"	—	7
1990	"Sweet Thing"	—	20

"—" denotes releases that did not chart.

== Personnel ==
- art direction – Bob Defrin
- choir – B. Flat, Curt D.I.S.S., M.A.D. Scratches, The Sharp, Speaker of the House
- chorus – B. Flat, Curt D.I.S.S., M.A.D. Scratches, The Sharp, Speaker of the House
- design – Lynn Kowalewski
- engineering – Andre Debourg
- mastering – Dennis King
- performer – New Beginning
- photography – Robert Manella
- production – Hurby "Luv Bug" Azor, The Invincibles
- vocals – B. Flat, Curt D.I.S.S., M.A.D. Scratches, The Sharp, Allan Sharp, Speaker of the House
- vocals (background) – Angela White, Jimmy Young
