= Gotta Go Gotta Leave (Tired) =

Single by Vivian Green

from the album Vivian
- Released: May 3, 2005
- Recorded: 2005
- Genre: R&B; neo soul
- Length: 4:36
- Label: Columbia
- Songwriters: Vivian Green; Junius Bervine
- Producer: Junius Bervine

Vivian Green singles chronology
"What Is Love?" (2003)	"Gotta Go Gotta Leave (Tired)" (2005)	"I Like It (But I Don't Need It)" (2005)

Music video
- "Gotta Go Gotta Leave (Tired)" on VH1.com

"Gotta Go Gotta Leave (Tired)" is a song co-written and performed by American contemporary R&B singer Vivian Green, issued as the lead single from her second studio album Vivian. On July 30, 2005, it became her second song to reach #1 on the Billboard dance chart (following her debut single "Emotional Rollercoaster").

== Music video ==
The official music video for the song was directed in summer 2005 by Diane Martel in downtown Muskegon, Michigan. The video features a cameo from The Wire actor Anwan "Slim" Glover.

== Charts ==
=== Weekly charts ===
Chart (2005)	Peak position
Netherlands Urban (MegaCharts)	76
US Bubbling Under Hot 100 (Billboard)	2
US Dance Club Songs (Billboard)	1
US Hot R&B/Hip-Hop Songs (Billboard)	24

=== Year-end charts ===
Chart (2005)	Position
US Hot R&B/Hip-Hop Songs (Billboard)	61
