= Scott Jeffers Traveler =

American musician

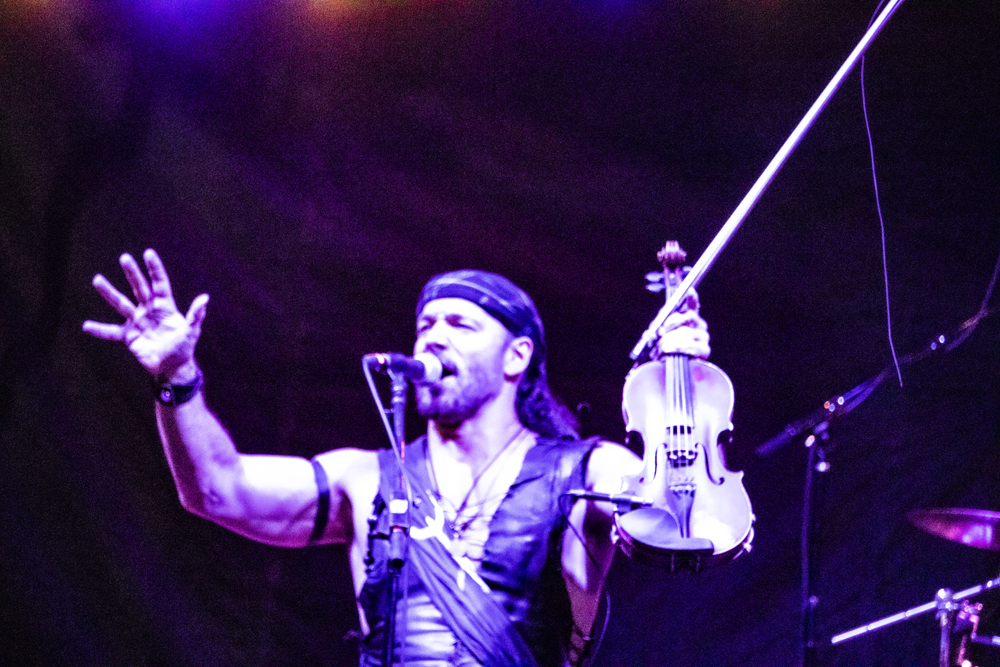
- Traveler performing in 2019

Background information
- Also known as: Traveler
- Born: Scott Jeffers
- Origin: United States
- Genres: Ethnic fusion; World music; hard rock
- Occupations: Composer; musician; record producer
- Instruments: Voice; violin; oud; lutar; guitar; bouzouki
- Member of: Traveler
- Formerly of: Prophecy
- Website: scottjefferstraveler.com

Scott Jeffers Traveler (born Scott Jeffers) is an American composer, singer, violinist and multi-instrumentalist; he is based in Phoenix, Arizona. Jeffers writes, records, and performs world music (Celtic, Middle Eastern, Gypsy, Asian, sea shanties) fused with rock. He is the lead performer of the world fusion rock band Traveler, and he also performs solo. Jeffers plays 25 instruments, including the oud, bouzouki, guitar, Moroccan lutar, and Indian wooden flute. He has a four-octave vocal range.

== Career ==
Scott Jeffers was lead singer and composer of the progressive rock band Prophecy between 1989 and 1994. They released the album Kingdoms in 1992. In 1995, he released his first full-length solo album, The Other Side, under the name Scott Jeffers.

The musician formed the ethnic fusion rock band Traveler in 2000, and the group released their first album the same year. Jeffers' compositions mix traditional ethnic music styles with progressive rock, reggae, and heavy metal. In his own words: "It evolved quite naturally, it just seemed to make sense putting traditional music to rock, just as the blues electrified became early rock 'n' roll, and later with bands like Deep Purple with classical elements, it just seemed like there should be no reason why these two intense musical elements shouldn't be fused".

Jeffers writes most of his compositions on the road, traveling in Asia, the Middle East, and Europe. The exotic instruments he brings back from his journeys are played both on recordings and during live concerts. His albums feature other rock musicians such as Ken Mary, David Ellefson, Steve Conley (F5), as well as ethnic musicians such as Qais Essar, Anupam Shobhakar, and Poranguí. Jeffers has been invited to various world music festivals and performed in Canada, the UK, and the US, among other places.

Jeffers' music links various cultures and genres, with common themes including Celtic and Middle Eastern styles. Some of his compositions combine aspects of different cultures into one song, such as Irish and Mongolian in "Pipes of Pitlochry" and India's elephant festival with 18th-century Scotland in "Kings of India". Traveler has performed at the Fountain Hill St. Patrick's Day festival and the Highland games. Jeffers has performed original and traditional music combined with folk-tunes-inspired compositions at the December Las Noches de las Luminarias, in the Desert Botanical Garden, every year since 2010.

=== Collaborations ===
Jeffers was lead vocalist and violinist at the 2009 Northern Light Orchestra concert and has contributed to a number of the group's recordings. He has also lent his voice and singing to animated movies.

== Discography ==
=== Solo ===
- The Other Side (1995)

=== Prophecy ===
- Kingdoms (1992)

=== Traveler ===
- Traveler (2000)
- Shadows and Dust (2002)
- Arabian Crossing (2003)
- Fields Forever (2005)
- Celtica (2007)
- Phoenicia (2007)
- Ancient Lands (2008)
- Old World Christmas (2011)
- Mongol (2011), featuring Ken Mary on drums
- Mutiny (2012), featuring Ken Mary, Rusty Jeffers
- Marrakesh (2012)
- Onward Journey (2013)
- Traveler Christmas (2014)
- Winds of Ksar Ghilane (2014)
- Symphonia (2015)
- Out of the Dust (2019)
- The Celtic Collection (2016)
- Kings of India (2021)
- Tales of Old Ireland (2024)

=== Other albums ===
- Mystic Journey with Masami Asahina (2002)

== Filmography ==
Year	Title	Role	Notes
2015	Jake and the Giants	Fe	Playback singer
2018	Two Pennies	Ivan	
