= Vivian (album) =

Studio album by Vivian Green
- Released: May 31, 2005
- Recorded: Various: The Sound Villa (Fort Lauderdale, Florida); Sony Music Studios (New York, New York); Axis Studio (Philadelphia, Pennsylvania); Angel Mountain (Bethlehem, Pennsylvania); Beat House Studios (Philadelphia, Pennsylvania); The Studio (Philadelphia, Pennsylvania)
- Genre: R&B
- Length: 54:39
- Label: Columbia
- Producers: Chauncey Childs (exec.); Anthony Bell; Junius Bervine; Zukhan Bey; Adam Blackstone; Steven Green; Vivian Green; Steve McKie; Kevin Patrick; James Poyser; Clay Sears; Spida Hole; Scott Storch; Che Vicious

Vivian Green chronology
A Love Story (2002)	Vivian (2005)	Beautiful (2010)

Singles from Vivian
- 1. "Gotta Go Gotta Leave (Tired)" Released: May 3, 2005; 2. "I Like It (But I Don't Need It)" Released: July 26, 2005; 3. "Cursed" Released: 2005

Vivian is the second studio album by American neo soul singer Vivian Green, released by Columbia on May 31, 2005, in Japan and June 28, 2005, in the United States. The album involves production by Scott Storch and James Poyser with additional production from Anthony Bell, Junius Bervine, and Adam Black Stone, among others. Vivian spawned three singles: "Gotta Go Gotta Leave (Tired)", "I Like It (But I Don't Need It)" and "Cursed". The album debuted at number eighteen on the Billboard 200 chart on July 16, 2005, with first-week sales of 46,000 copies.

== Critical reception ==
Professional ratings
Review scores
Source	Rating
Allmusic	3.5/5 stars
East Bay Express	favorable
People	3/4 stars
PopMatters	5/10 stars
Rolling Stone	2/5 stars
SoulTracks	mixed
Sun-Sentinel	favorable
The Pitch	favorable
Time Out Chicago	favorable
Vibe	3/5 stars

People magazine called the album a "satisfying sophomore outing" and wrote: "Vivian, with its more straightforward contemporary soul, lacks the jazzy shadings of the superior A Love Story, and the last third of the disc suffers from a few forgettable tracks. By then, however, Green and her everywoman appeal have already left a winning impression." Allmusic editor Andy Kellman felt that Green "sounds more sure of herself here than on A Love Story, and she's also more convincing, regardless of the scenario she's placed within. A few extraneous songs do weigh Vivian down, but it's still a marked improvement over her debut."

PopMatters critic Steve Horowitz found that while "Vivian has many merits, the disc does suffer from too much of the same thing. Not only are the lyrics repetitive in nature, but the basic instrumentation and static beats get tiresome [...] Vivian may be more radio friendly as a result." Rolling Stone journalist Barry Walters remarked that "trading the jazzy retro-soul of her debut for overly familiar mainstream R&B; beats, Green now strains her pipes like every other overwrought wanna-be diva, with diminished results. Too many tortured relationship songs suggest Green should consider musical and couples counseling."

== Chart performance ==
Vivian debuted at number 18 on the US Billboard 200, and at number 5 on Billboard's Top R&B/Hip-Hop Albums chart, scoring first-week sales of 46,000 copies.

The first single from the album, "Gotta Go Gotta Leave (Tired)", peaked at number 24 on the US Hot R&B/Hip-Hop Songs. The single became Green's second top 40 hit on the chart and her second chart-topped on the Hot Dance Club Songs after 2003's "Emotional Rollercoaster." The second single from the album was "I Like It (But I Don't Need It)," another number-one hit on the Hot Dance Club Songs. Third and final single from the album was "Cursed". Released in late 2005, the single didn't match the commercial success of the previous two singles, peaking at a number 2 on the Bubbling Under R&B/Hip-Hop Songs chart, which is equivalent to number 102 on the Hot R&B/Hip-Hop Songs chart.

== Track listing ==
Vivian – Standard edition
No.	Title	Writer(s)	Producer(s)	Length
1.	"Wish We Could Go Back"	Vivian Green; Scott Storch	Storch	3:37
2.	"Mad"	Green; Storch	Storch	3:38
3.	"Frustrated"	Green; Anthony Bell; Ronald Frost	Bell; Green^{[a]}	3:39
4.	"Damn"	Green; Junius Bervine	Clay Sears	3:40
5.	"Selfish"	Green; Adam Blackstone; Steve McKie	Blackstone; McKie; Green^{[a]}	4:35
6.	"Under My Skin"	Green; James Poyser	Poyser	3:53
7.	"I Like It (But I Don't Need It)"	Green; Poyser; Che Vicious	Poyser; Vicious; Green^{[a]}	4:10
8.	"Sweet Memory (Beautifully Young)"	Green; Poyser	Poyser; Green^{[a]}	4:24
9.	"Gotta Go Gotta Leave (Tired)"	Green; Bervine	Bervine; Green^{[a]}; Kevin Patrick^{[a]}; Poyser^{[a]}	4:36
10.	"Perfect Decision"	Green; Poyser; Zukhan Bey	Poyser; Green^{[a]}; Bey^{[a]}	3:58
11.	"All About Us"	Green; Bervine	Sears; Green^{[a]}	3:40
12.	"Sweet Thing"	Green; McKie; Steven Green	McKie; Steven Green; Green^{[a]}	3:37
13.	"Cursed"	Green; Raymel Menefee; Poyser; Bey	Poyser; Green^{[a]}; Bey^{[a]}	4:24
14.	"Outro (Family & Friends)"	Darryl Crawford; Courtney Fleming; S. Green	Spida Hole Productions	2:46

Vivian – iTunes edition
No.	Title	Writer(s)	Producer(s)	Length
15.	"Can't Say It Enough"	Bell, Green & Ryan Moys	Bell & Green	3:27

Vivian – Special edition
No.	Title	Writer(s)	Producer(s)	Length
15.	"Fanatic" (Scott Storch Remix)	Green; Fred Kenney	Kenney; Storch^{[b]}	4:14
16.	"I Like It (But I Don't Need It)" (Poker Face Remix)	Green; Poyser; Vicious	Kenney; Poker Face^{[b]}	2:40

Notes

- ^{^[a]} denotes co-producer
- ^{^[b]} denotes additional producer

== Credits ==
- David Barnett – viola
- Anthony Bell – multi instruments, producer, engineer, string arrangements
- Junius Bervine – multi instruments, producer
- Zukhan Bey – programming, producer
- Adam Blackstone – multi instruments, producer
- Jim Bottari – engineer
- Jeff Bradshaw – trombone
- Alice Butts – art direction, design
- Angela Carter – A&R, management
- Chauncey Childs – executive producer, management
- Carl Cox Jr. – saxophone
- Kevin "KD" Davis – mixing
- Jenny DLorenzo – cello
- Omar Edwards – keyboards
- Ghislaine Fleishman – violin
- Larry Gold – string arrangements
- Conrad Golding – engineer
- Steve Green – programming
- Kevin Hanson – guitar
- Kam Houff – engineer, mixing
- Gloria Justin – violin
- Emma Kummrow – violin
- Sandy Leem – viola
- Keith Major – photography
- John McGlinchey – assistant engineer
- Steve McKie – drums, multi instruments, producer
- Julie Miller – engineer
- Ryan Moys – engineer
- Ben ONeill – guitar
- Kevin Patrick – producer, A&R
- James Poyser – piano, keyboards, programming, producer, string arrangements
- Tony Prendatt – mixing
- Clayton Sears – guitar, producer
- Marni Senofonte – wardrobe
- Eric Spearman – make-up
- Scott Storch – producer
- Igor Szwec – violin
- Chris Theis – mixing
- Stephen Tirpak – trumpet
- Steve Tirpak – trumpet
- Tish Hair – stylist
- Chuck Treese – guitar
- Che Vicious – programming, producer, mixing
- Christopher Weatherbe – keyboards

== Charts ==
Chart (2005)	Peak position
US Billboard 200	18
US Top R&B/Hip-Hop Albums (Billboard)	5

== Release history ==
List of release dates, showing country, format, label, edition, and reference
Country	Date	Edition	Format	Label	Ref.
Japan	May 31, 2005	Standard; special	CD; digital download	Columbia	
United States	June 28, 2005	Standard; special	CD; digital download	Columbia	
