= Nao Yoshioka =

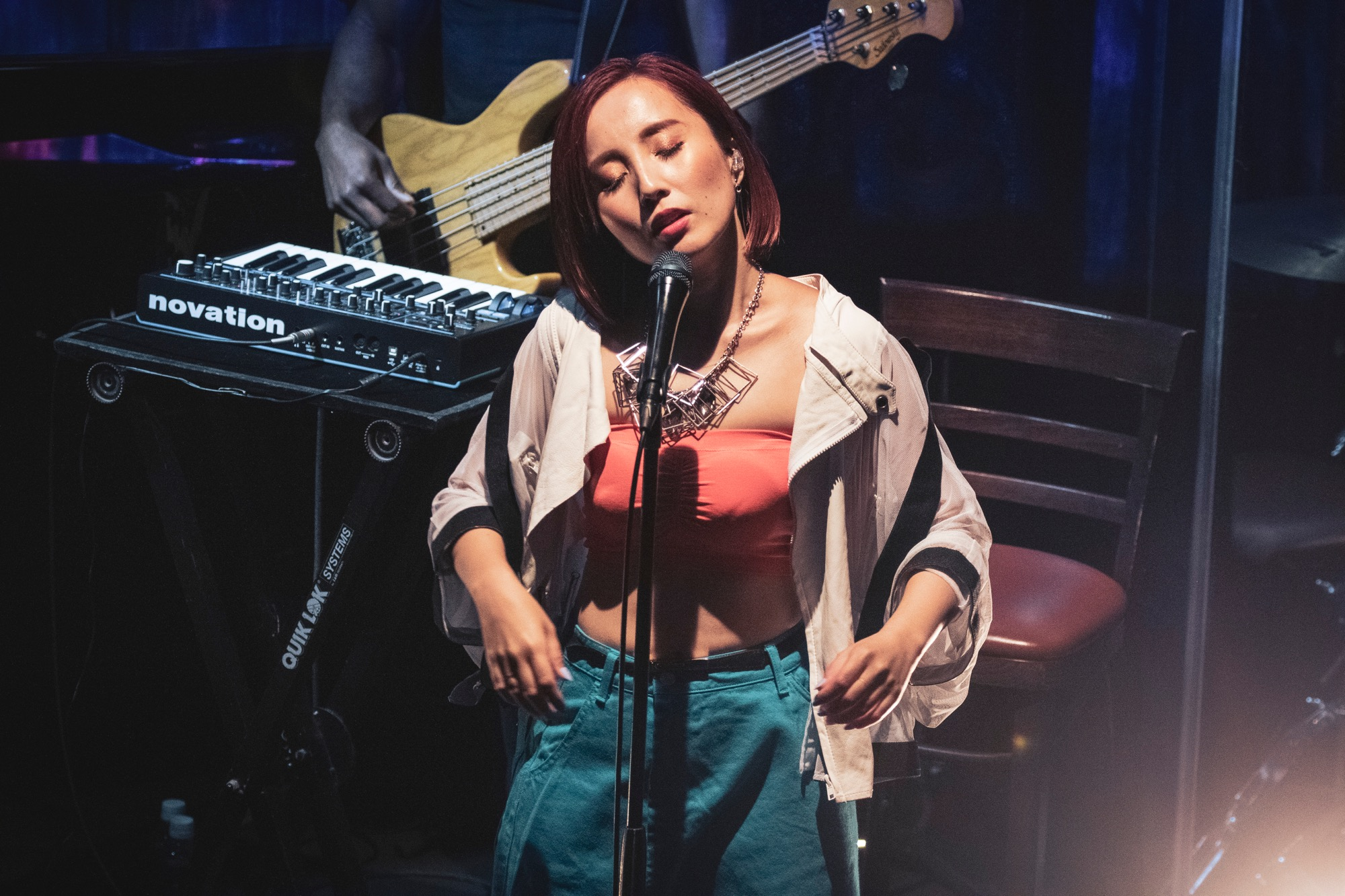
- Yoshioka performing live at Blue Note Tokyo 2019

Background information
- Genres: R&B; soul
- Years active: 2011–present
- Label: Sweet Soul Records
- Website: www.naoyoshioka.com

Nao Yoshioka (born March 2, 1988) is a soul singer and songwriter from Osaka, Japan, now based in Tokyo.

== Early life ==
Yoshioka was born in Osaka, Japan on 2 March 1988. Her father studied painting and eventually became an interior designer. Her mother was an illustrator before becoming a dress designer.

Yoshioka's parents encouraged her and her two older sisters to explore creative pursuits. Yoshioka attended an arts high school and studied painting and sculpture, eventually joining a band as a vocalist. Yoshioka entered a debut recording competition sponsored by a music vocational school and won. She then worked with a vocal trainer and learned more about blues and soul music.

After problems at school and coping with her parents' divorce, Yoshioka struggled to concentrate on her musical ambitions. She eventually dropped out of high school and moved to New York City to pursue a career as a singer.

== Early career and debut album ==
Yoshioka broke into the soul scene while spending two and a half years in New York City beginning in 2009. In 2011 she reached the Top Dog Round at the Apollo Theater Season Final and the final stage of the McDonald's Gospelfest.

She came to wider notice in 2012 when she was discovered by Naoki Yamanouchi, Sweet Soul Records' CEO, who released her single "Make the Change." Her debut album The Light, released 13 November 2013, included a number of original songs, a duet with Brian Owens on a cover of "Ain't No Mountain High Enough," and covers of "At Last," "A Change is Gonna Come," and "His Eye is on the Sparrow." The album was an international effort, recorded in the U.S., the Netherlands, and Japan, with songwriting, arranging, and production collaborations from Owens, Dani Elliott, ORLY, the Netherlands' Shirma Rouse, and Hiroyuki Matsuda.

== International career ==
In May 2014, Yoshioka and Owens debuted at Blue Note Tokyo, and in August of that year she was invited to perform at the Meet the World Beat summer festival hosted by Osaka radio station FM802, which selected Yoshioka's music for "Heavy Rotation" programming whereupon her music was played in heavy rotation for the entire month. On 8 April 2015 her second album, Rising, was released in Japan by Sweet Soul Records and Yamaha Music Communications.

Shortly thereafter, on 17 July 2015, The Light was released in the U.S. and Canada by Purpose Music Group and NIA Distribution. In 2015 she received a SoulTracks Readers' Choice Award as Best New Artist. In the summer of 2016, Yoshioka performed at her first major US music festival, Capital Jazz Fest, alongside artists including Lalah Hathaway and Marcus Miller.

Her third album, The Truth, released in 2016, also included many collaborations. The album's U.S. re-release (4 September 2018) received glowing reviews, noting that she was the first Japanese soul singer to make waves in the birthplace of the music she's devoted her career to. Rolling Stone called the album "impeccable neo-soul." Yoshioka's collaborators on the album included Khari Mateen, Musicman Ty, and Carolyn Malachi. The lead single "I Love When" hit the Top 40 (#32) on the Urban Adult Contemporary Billboard chart. SoulBounce debuted the single "Spark" on 27 August 2018.

In 2018, Yoshioka moved to New York City. Additional recognition in the UK arrived that year too, as in January 2019 she was awarded the 2018 Bright Star Award (UK and international Soul and Reggae) for Best International Artist. Yoshioka performed at the Blue Note in New York in April 2019, a few months before the August 16 release of her fourth album, Undeniable, again on Sweet Soul Records. The single "All In Me" premiered at PopMatters August 9, SoulTracks debuted her video single "Got Me" on July 27, and Earmilk featured the single "Liberation" produced by Eric Roberson. Other bookings in 2019 included San Jose Jazz's Summer Fest.

== Discography ==
=== Albums ===
Title	Release date	Label
The Light	2013	Sweet Soul Records
Rising	2015	Sweet Soul Records and Yamaha Music Communications
Nao Yoshioka & Brian Owens Live at Blue Note Tokyo	2015	Sweet Soul Records
The Truth	2016	Sweet Soul Records and Yamaha Music Communications
Undeniable	2019	Sweet Soul Records
Flow	2024	Sweet Soul Records
Self	2026	Sweet Soul Records

=== Singles ===
Title	Album	Release date	Label	Producer
"Make the Change"	The Light	June 27, 2012	Sweet Soul Records	Hiroyuki Matsuda
"Spend My Life"	The Light	October 9, 2013	Sweet Soul Records	Brian Owens and Tony Esterly
"I Love When"	The Truth	June 14, 2018	Sweet Soul Records and Yamaha Music Communications	Musicman Ty
"Spark"	The Truth	August 31, 2018	Sweet Soul Records and Yamaha Music Communications	Hiroyuki Matsuda
"Got Me"	Undeniable	July 26, 2019	Sweet Soul Records	Musicman Ty
"Liberation"	Undeniable	August 2, 2019	Sweet Soul Records	Daniel Crawford
"All in Me" (feat. Khari Mateen)	Undeniable	August 9, 2019	Sweet Soul Records	Khari Mateen
"Tokyo 2020"	""	April 22, 2022	Sweet Soul Records	Corey Bernhard and Naoki Yamanouchi
"Wave"	-	September 16, 2022	Sweet Soul Records	Musicman Ty
