= Poranguí =

World music multi-instrumentalist

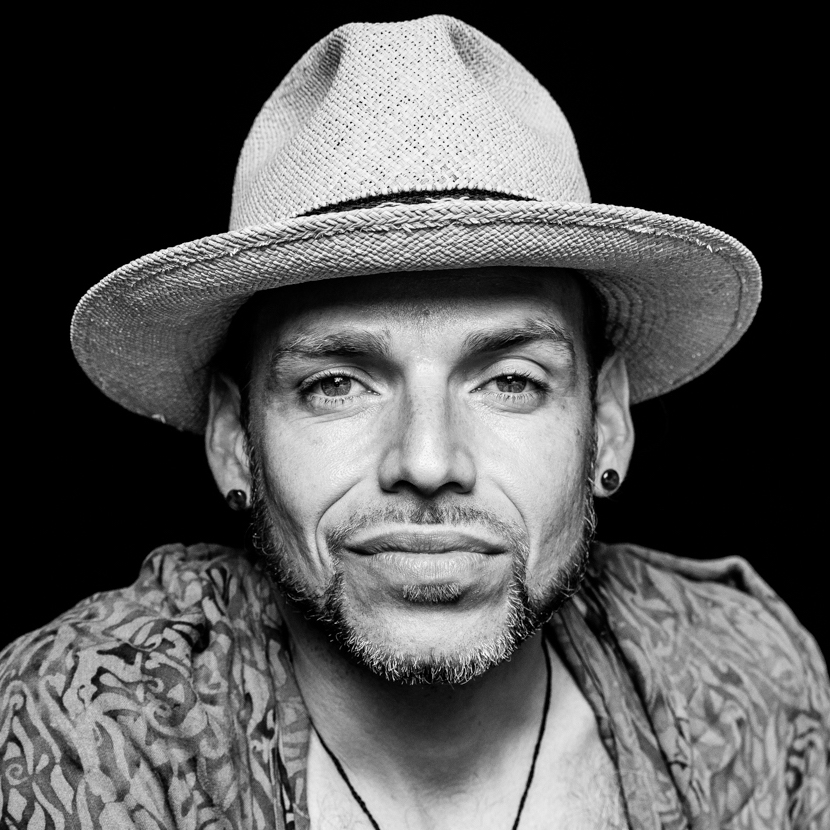
- Poranguí in 2016

Background information
- Genres: World
- Instruments: Live looping; world percussion; guitar; voice; didgeridoo; flutes
- Years active: 1997–present
- Labels: Sol Creation; Desert Trax
- Website: porangui.com

Poranguí is a world music multi-instrumentalist known for solo improvisational live looping. Born in São José dos Campos, Brazil, he grew up in the cultures of Brazil (his mother), Mexico (his father), and the southwestern United States. He currently resides in Sedona, Arizona.

== Education and teaching ==
After high school, Poranguí spent a year studying in China and then teaching English through the use of music in Vietnam. Then, while on a scholarship to Duke University as a Coca-Cola Scholar, he created an interdisciplinary undergraduate major combining music, movement, and medicine, where he also earned the John Hope Franklin Student Documentary Award.

He has taught on the faculty of the Phoenix Conservatory of Music and was a panel member for the Arizona Commission on the Arts in 2015.

== Musical career ==
After graduating from Duke University, Poranguí directed the ten-piece Afro-Brazilian ensemble Grupo Liberdade, from 2004 to 2017. He has also collaborated with artists such as Liquid Bloom, Shaman's Dream, and Eric Zang. In 2011, Poranguí released an EP, Terra Sagrada, on his own label, Sol Creation, with Eric Zang, under the name Poranguí & Zang.

He has performed and recorded with the BBC in London at the Jazz Cafe with Osunlade, for the PBS Singer-Songwriter Series with his ensemble Grupo Liberdade, and as a featured artist for TEDxSedona and for the SXSW Yoga Soundscape Series. He has performed at Lightning in a Bottle festival, Beloved Festival, Sonic Bloom Festival, Sedona Yoga Festival, Boom Festival (Portugal), and Ozora Festival (Hungary), among others.

In 2016, Poranguí collaborated with filmmakers Mitch Schultz and Aubrey Marcus on the documentary Ayahuasca, which spawned his second studio album, also titled Ayahuasca. Desert Trax released a remix version of the album in 2017. The musician released his first live album, self-titled Poranguí, on 1 March 2019, along with a guided meditation version featuring Ashley Klein. Desert Trax released two remix versions of the record in 2019, with Resueño issuing another remix version a year later. Shaman's Dream Records published Poranguí's EP Earth Keepers, another collaboration with Eric Zhang, in July 2021. In August of that year, Poranguí was remixed by Mose and released as Poranguí – Mose Remixes. In October 2021, Poranguí and Liquid Bloom released Kuya Sessions: Cura—the first installment in a four-part musical series intended for psychedelic-assisted therapy. In April 2022, Poranguí, Vylana, Aubrey Marcus, Liquid Bloom, and Eric Zang released the album Remembrance, under the collaborative name For the Good of All. This was followed by Remembrance: Soundscapes—a music-only version of the album. Later the same month, Poranguí and Liquid Bloom published Kuya Sessions: Samadhi. Kuya Sessions: Akasha came out in November of that year.

== Discography ==
Studio albums

| Year | Title | Artists | Type |
|---|---|---|---|
| 2011 | Terra Sagrada | Poranguí & Zang | EP |
| 2016 | Ayahuasca (Original Motion Picture Soundtrack) | Poranguí | Studio |
| 2017 | Ayahuasca Remixed | Poranguí & various artists | Remix |
| 2019 | Poranguí | Poranguí | Live |
| 2019 | Poranguí – Guided Journey | Poranguí, Ashley Klein | Live + meditation |
| 2019 | Suburban Gypsy: The Becoming | Jill Colucci & Poranguí | Studio |
| 2019 | Poranguí Remixes Vol. I | Poranguí & various artists | Remix |
| 2019 | Poranguí Remixes Vol. II | Poranguí & various artists | Remix |
| 2020 | Poranguí Resueño Remixes | Poranguí & various artists | Remix |
| 2020 | Peyote Canyon | Poranguí, Liquid Bloom | Studio |
| 2021 | Poranguí – Mose Remixes | Poranguí, Mose | Remix |
| 2021 | Kuya Sessions: Cura | Poranguí, Liquid Bloom | Studio |
| 2022 | Remembrance | Vylana, Aubrey Marcus, For the Good of All | Studio |
| 2022 | Kuya Sessions: Samadhi | Poranguí, Liquid Bloom | Studio |
| 2022 | Remembrance: Soundscapes | Vylana, For the Good of All | Studio |
| 2022 | Kuya Sessions: Akasha | Poranguí, Liquid Bloom | Studio |
| 2023 | Kura Sessions: Cura Remixes | Poranguí | Remix |
| 2023 | Beauty Way | Poranguí | Studio |
| 2023 | Kuya Sessions: Sol | Poranguí, Liquid Bloom | Studio |
| 2023 | Kuya Sessions: Samadhi Remixes | Poranguí | Remix |
| 2023 | ANTIGUA (Live at Sugarshack) | Poranguí | Live |
| 2024 | Kuya Sessions: Akasha Remixes | Poranguí | Remix |
| 2024 | Live at Envision | Poranguí | Live |
| 2024 | Kuya Sessions: Sol Remixes | Poranguí, Liquid Bloom | Remix |

Collaborations / remixes / singles

| Year | Title | Artist | Album |
|---|---|---|---|
| 2017 | "Sacred" | J Brave (feat. Kayt Pearl & Poranguí) | "Sacred" (single) |
| 2017 | "Sacred Blessing (Re.Generations mix)" | Liquid Bloom feat. Poranguí | Re.Generations |
| 2017 | "Fire Gathering (Re.Generations mix)" | Liquid Bloom feat. Poranguí | Re.Generations |
| 2017 | "Resonant Migration (Re.Generations mix)" | Liquid Bloom feat. Poranguí | Re.Generations |
| 2017 | "Fire Gathering (ReGen: AtYyA Remix)" | Liquid Bloom feat. Poranguí | ReGen: AtYyA Remixes |
| 2017 | "Resonant Migration feat. Deya Dova (ReGen: AtYyA Remix)" | Liquid Bloom feat. Poranguí | ReGen: AtYyA Remixes |
| 2017 | "Sacred Blessing (Kaminanda Remix)" | Liquid Bloom feat. Poranguí | ReGen: Lucid Remixes |
| 2017 | "Fire Gathering (Suduaya Remix)" | Liquid Bloom feat. Poranguí | ReGen: Lucid Remixes |
| 2017 | "Resonant Migration feat. Deya Dova (TRIBONE Remix)" | Liquid Bloom feat. Poranguí | ReGen: Lucid Remixes |
| 2018 | "Resonant Migrant feat. Deya Dova (Drumspyder Remix)" | Liquid Bloom (Poranguí track used) | ReGen: Drumspyder Remixes |
| 2018 | "Fire Gathering feat. Poranguí (Mose Remix)" | Liquid Bloom & Poranguí Remix | ReGen: Mose Remixes |
| 2018 | "Sacred Blessing feat. Poranguí (Mose Remix)" | Liquid Bloom & Poranguí Remix | ReGen: Mose Remixes |
| 2018 | "Ayahuasca" | Liquid Bloom & Poranguí Remix | From Sand to Stone |
| 2018 | "Arcoiris (Mose Remix)" | Poranguí | From Sand to Stone |
| 2018 | "AtYya – Illumiate" | Liquid Bloom Remix ft. Poranguí | From Sand to Stone |
| 2019 | "Ayé Yewo" | Liquid Bloom, Poranguí, Spice Traders | Ayé Yewo |
| 2019 | "The Invocation" | Poranguí | Suburban Gypsy |
| 2019 | "Corazón Abierto" | Poranguí | Suburban Gypsy |
| 2019 | "Closing Prayer" | Poranguí | Suburban Gypsy |
| 2019 | "The Miracle of Life" | Jill Colucci, Poranguí | Suburban Gypsy |
| 2020 | "Peyote Canyon" | Liquid Bloom, Poranguí, Spice Traders | Peyote Canyon |
| 2020 | "Corazón de Gaia" | Liquid Bloom, Poranguí, Spice Traders | Corazón de Gaia |
| 2020 | "Ocean of Remembrance (Sacred Blessings)" | Liquid Bloom, Poranguí | Regen: Ambient Meditations |
| 2020 | "Regreso al Agua" | Liquid Bloom, Poranguí | Regreso al Agua |
| 2021 | "Nefes (Drumspyder Remix)" | Shaman's Dream, Poranguí, Eric Zang | Non-album single |
| 2021 | "Iluminar (J.Pool Remix feat. Eric Zang)" | Poranguí | Non-album single |
| 2021 | "Iluminar (Dre Guazzelli Remix)" | Poranguí | Non-album single |
| 2021 | "Stardust (ATYYA Remix)" | Poranguí | Non-album single |
| 2021 | "Olorum" | Shaman's Dream, Poranguí, Eric Zang | Earth Keepers |
| 2021 | "Nefes" | Shaman's Dream, Poranguí, Eric Zang | Earth Keepers |
| 2021 | "Cedar Moon (Feat. Geometrae)" | Shaman's Dream, Poranguí, Eric Zang | Earth Keepers |
| 2021 | "Abakwa (Future Roots Mix)" | Shaman's Dream, Liquid Bloom, Poranguí | Rise Up Remixed |
