= Beautiful (Vivian Green album) =

Studio album by Vivian Green
- Released: April 6, 2010
- Recorded: The Circle; Sicklerville, New Jersey; Downtown Recording Studio; Rocko's Lab; Auntz Recording Studio; Philadelphia, Pennsylvania
- Genre: R&B
- Length: 51:05
- Label: E1
- Producer: Anthony Bell; Jason Farmer

Vivian Green chronology
| Vivian (2005) | Beautiful (2010) | The Green Room (2012) |

Singles from Beautiful
- 1. "Beautiful" Released: February 23, 2010; 2. "Too Intense" Released: May 12, 2010

Beautiful is the third studio album by American singer Vivian Green. It was released by E1 Music on April 6, 2010 in the United States. Her first album after her departure from Columbia Records, on which she released her first two albums, Green reteamed with longtime friend and collaborator Anthony Bell to work on Beautiful, with addition production provided by Jason Farmer. Title track "Beautiful" served the album's leading single and was released February 23, 2010. The song entitled "Jordan's Song" is also a dedication to her son.

== Critical reception ==
Professional ratings
Review scores
| Source | Rating |
|---|---|
| About.com | 3.5/5 stars |
| Allmusic | 3/5 stars |
| SoulCulture | 3.5/5 stars |
| SoulTracks | favorable |
| Soulwalking | mixed |
| Sound-Savvy | 3.5/5 stars |

Allmusic editor Andy Kellman found that "though it arrives almost five years after her previous album and was made on a significantly lower budget, it won’t throw anyone for a loop, as it sounds just like a Vivian Green album, one that deals with a fair amount of heartache as well as the rush that comes with finding new love. It’s less about big hooks than nuanced arrangements, even on the heavily synthesized/programmed songs, and Green’s lyrics are as easily relatable as ever."

== Chart performance ==
The album debuted at number 101 on the Billboard 200, number 26 on the Top R&B/Hip-Hop Albums chart, and number 13 on the Top Independent Albums chart. As of January 2012, the album has sold more than 22,000 copies.

== Track listing ==
| No. | Title | Writer(s) | Producer(s) | Length |
|---|---|---|---|---|
| 1. | "Beautiful" | Vivian Green; Anthony Bell; Irving Washington | Bell | 4:41 |
| 2. | "When We're Apart" | V. Green; Solomon Green; Bell | Bell | 3:31 |
| 3. | "I Know How" | V. Green; Jason "J-Vibe" Farmer | Bell; Farmer | 3:54 |
| 4. | "Better Man (Skit)" | V. Green; Bell; Kevin Hanson | Bell | 1:24 |
| 5. | "Better Man" | V. Green; S. Green; Bell; Hanson | Bell | 4:11 |
| 6. | "Save Me" | V. Green; Farmer | Bell; Farmer | 3:46 |
| 7. | "Too Intense" | V. Green; Bell; Robert Thomas | Bell | 3:40 |
| 8. | "Somewhere" | V. Green; Bell | Bell | 4:09 |
| 9. | "Caught Up" | V. Green; Bell | Bell | 4:10 |
| 10. | "Search Is Over" | V. Green; S. Green; Bell; Pacal Alejandro Bayley | Bell | 4:05 |
| 11. | "So Far Gone" | V. Green; Bell | Bell | 3:40 |
| 12. | "Jordan's Song" | V. Green; Bell | Bell | 5:44 |
| 13. | "One of None" | V. Green; Bell | Bell | 4:10 |

== Charts ==
| Chart (2010) | Peak position |
|---|---|
| US Billboard 200 | 101 |
| US Independent Albums (Billboard) | 13 |
| US Top R&B/Hip-Hop Albums (Billboard) | 26 |
