= Vivid (Vivian Green album) =

Studio album by Vivian Green
- Released: August 7, 2015
- Genre: R&B
- Length: 41:25
- Label: Make Noise/Caroline
- Producer: Kwamé Holland (exec.)

Vivian Green chronology
The Green Room (2012)	Vivid (2015)	VGVI (2017)

Singles from Vivid
- 1. "Get Right Back to My Baby" Released: March 3, 2015

Professional ratings
Review scores
Source	Rating
AllMusic	4/5 stars

Vivid is the fifth studio album by American contemporary R&B singer Vivian Green, released August 7, 2015. It is Green's first album released on Kwamé's record label Make Noise Records (which is distributed via Caroline Records); and was produced by Kwamé, As of November 2021, the album has not charted on the Billboard 200 but has reached #24 on the Billboard R&B chart.

The album's first single is "Get Right Back to My Baby", which has reached number eight on the U.S. Adult R&B chart.

== Critical reception ==
The album has received positive reviews. Andy Kellman of AllMusic rated the album four out of five stars and called Green's vibe on the album "confident and comfortable". BrentMusicReviews.com called the album "a fine collection" and "a welcome R&B effort".

== Track listing ==
All lyrics are written by Vivian Green and Kwamé Holland; all music is composed by Kwamé Holland; except where noted

No.	Title	Writer(s)	Length
1.	"Jordan's Intro" (featuring Jordan Green)	Jordan Green; Kwamé Holland	1:11
2.	"The One That Got Away"		3:43
3.	"Work"		4:11
4.	"Broken"		4:24
5.	"All I Want Is You" (featuring Raheem DeVaughn)	Vivian Green; Raheem DeVaughn; Kwamé Holland	4:09
6.	"Get Right Back to My Baby" ( (Note: "Get Right Back to My Baby" contains a sample of "Before I Let Go" as performed by Maze.))	Vivian Green; Kwamé Holland; Frankie Beverly	3:32
7.	"123"		3:21
8.	"The Interlude with Cayman Kelly"	Cayman Kelly	0:36
9.	"Disrespectful"	Vivian Green; Kwamé Holland; Josh Rivera	4:11
10.	"Just Like Fools"		4:20
11.	"Count Your Blessings" (featuring Treena Ferebee)		4:19
12.	"Leave It All Behind"		2:50
13.	"Outro"		0:38
Total length:			41:25

== Chart positions ==
Chart (2015)	Peak position
US Independent Albums (Billboard)	23
US Top R&B/Hip-Hop Albums (Billboard)	24
