= Vivian Green =

American singer-songwriter

- Born: Vivian Sakiyyah Green; May 22, 1979 (age 47); Philadelphia, Pennsylvania, U.S.
- Genres: R&B, soul
- Occupations: Singer; songwriter; pianist
- Instruments: Vocals, piano
- Years active: 1996–present
- Labels: SoNo Recording Group; Make Noise; eOne Music; Columbia
- Website: viviangreen.com

Vivian Sakiyyah Green (born May 22, 1979) is an American singer-songwriter and pianist. A classically trained pianist, Green began writing songs at the age of 11 and was signed by Columbia Records at 22. She release her debut studio album, A Love Story (2002). Met with critical acclaim and commercial success, the album sold over half a million copies in the United States and various music award nominations. It contained the Billboard Adult R&B Songs-number one single "Emotional Rollercoaster". Her second album, Vivian (2005), became her highest-charting album, peaking in the top twenty on the Billboard 200 and spawning the US Dance-number one singles "Gotta Go Gotta Leave (Tired)" and "I Like It (But I Don't Need It)".

After parting with Columbia Records, she signed with independent record label eOne Music and released two albums: Beautiful (2010) and The Green Room (2012). She later moved to Make Noise Recordings where she experienced as a resurgence with the release of her fifth album Vivid (2015) and the Adult R&B Songs-number two single "Get Right Back to My Baby".

== Early life ==
Vivian Sakiyyah Green was born on May 22, 1979, in East Oak Lane, Philadelphia. She also has two brothers, Steven and Solomon; the latter of which is also a songwriter. At the age of eight, Green was enrolled in piano lessons. She began writing songs at the age of eleven and briefly became a member of a female quintet called Younique. In 1996, she graduated from Parkway Northwest High School in Philadelphia.

== Career ==
=== 1996–2001: Career beginnings ===
In 1996, Green became managed by Michael McCary. She co-wrote "Dear God" for American R&B quartet Boyz II Men's album Evolution (1997). While performing at party, she was offered a recording contract with Ruffhouse Records but her parents declined the offer on her behalf. She became a session singer for music producers, often demoing songs for other singers. Green also began performing in several bands for weddings and jazz clubs. While working with music producer Malik Pendleton, she was introduced to singer Eric Roberson. She began working with Roberson on her own songs and demos were sent to Sony Music Records. In January 2001, Green toured as a background singer for Jill Scott's Words and Sounds Tour. Scott recorded a live album and concert film titled Experience: Jill Scott 826+ (2001), which features Green's background vocals throughout the album.

=== 2002–2006: A Love Story and Columbia Records ===
In 2001, Green was managed by Chauncey Childs and secured a major record deal with Columbia Records, a subsidiary of Sony Music Group, after the label accepted her demo. Green had been recording her first album A Love Story prior to her record deal. The album was released on November 12, 2002, to mixed reviews by various music critics. A Love Story peaked at number 51 on the US Billboard 200 and number 8 on the Top R&B/Hip-Hop Albums chart. The album's lead single, "Emotional Rollercoaster", peaked at number 39 on the US Billboard Hot 100 and atop the US Adult R&B Songs chart. In April 2003, she made a guest appearance in American drama television series American Dreams, portraying singer Brenda Holloway in season one's episode "The Carpetbaggers". By May 2003, A Love Story has been certified gold by the Recording Industry Association of America (RIAA) for selling over 500,000 copies in the United States. She released two more singles: "Fanatic" and "What is Love?", both of which charted in the top-twenty positions on the Adult R&B Songs chart, respectively. "Superwoman" was planned to be the final single of the album but was never commercially released. In June 2003, she toured as the opening act for Musiq Soulchild's tour.

Her second album Vivian was released in May 2005, peaking at number 18 on the Billboard 200 and number 5 on the US Top R&B/Hip-Hop Albums chart, becoming her highest-charting album. The album's first single "Gotta Go Gotta Leave (Tired)" became her second song to top both the US Adult R&B Songs chart and the US Hot Dance Club Play chart. Although the album's second single "I Like It (But I Don't Need It)" also peaked atop of the US Dance chart, it failed to repeat the overall success of its predecessor. In 2006, she was released from Columbia Records after disappointing album sales.

=== 2009–2013: eOne Music ===
In March 2009, Green announced that she had signed a three-album recording contract with independent recording label eOne Music. In April 2010, she released her third album Beautiful. The album spawned the single "Beautiful" which peaked at number 10 on the Adult R&B Songs chart. Her fourth album The Green Room was released on October 9, 2012. The album spawned the top-thirty Billboard Adult R&B Songs "Anything Out There" and "Still Here".

=== 2014–present: Make Noise Recordings ===
In 2014, Green became the first artist signed to American rapper/producer Kwamé's independent record label, Make Noise Recordings. She released her fifth album Vivid on August 7, 2015. The album's lead single, "Get Right Back to My Baby", peaked at number 2 on the Adult R&B Songs chart. Her follow-up single "Grown Folks Music (Work)" peaked at number 15 on the Adult R&B Songs chart.

On July 7, 2017, Green released her single "I Don't Know". The song became a top-10 hit on Billboard's Adult R&B chart. "I Don't Know" preceded her sixth studio album, VGVI, which was released on October 6, 2017. The album's second single "Vibes" peaked at number 12 on the Adult R&B Songs chart in 2018. In October 2019, Green and Kwamé signed with the SoNo Recording Group through Kwamé's record label, Make Noise Recordings. Her seventh studio album, Love Absolute, was released on November 13, 2020.

== Artistry ==
From the beginning of her career, Green has been noted for being a multifaceted talent as a singer, songwriter, and instrumentalist. Music critic William Ruhlmann of AllMusic remarked "Green is a likable enough singer with the usual romantic obsessions and a sense of generalized vocal embellishment." Billboard magazine journalist Gail Mitchell referred to her as "a young sophisticate reminiscent of an early Toni Braxton or Anita Baker." Vivian Green has cited Ella Fitzgerald, Sarah Vaughn, Teena Marie, Donny Hathaway, and Barbra Streisand as musical influences.

== Personal life ==
In 2004, she gave birth to her son Jordan. Green became an advocate for special needs children, publicly speaking about her experiences.

== Discography ==
Studio albums

- A Love Story (2002)
- Vivian (2005)
- Beautiful (2010)
- The Green Room (2012)
- Vivid (2015)
- VGVI (2017)
- Love Absolute (2020)

== Award history ==
BET Awards

- 2003: Best R&B Female Artist (nominated)

Groovevolt Music & Fashion Awards

- 2004: Best Song Performance - Female "Emotional Rollercoaster" (nominated)

Lady of the Soul Train Awards

- 2003: Best Solo R&B/Soul Single "Emotional Rollercoaster" (nominated)
- 2003: Best Solo R&B/Soul Album of the Year A Love Story (nominated)
- 2003: Best Solo R&B/Soul or Rap New Artist: Vivian Green (nominated)

Soul Train Awards

- 2015: Centric Certified Award (nominated)
