= Algebra (singer) =

American contemporary R&B singer (born 1976)

Algebra Blessett
- Born: Algebra Felicia Blessett; April 9, 1976 (age 50); Atlanta, Georgia, United States
- Genres: R&B, neo soul
- Occupation: Singer-songwriter
- Labels: Rowdy Records, Kedar, Purpose, E1 Music

Algebra Felicia Blessett (born April 9, 1976), usually known as Algebra Blessett or just Algebra, is an American contemporary R&B singer.

== Early life ==
Blessett's mother was a gospel singer and bass player, and Blessett grew up to the sounds of soul music, gospel and R&B. Like many R&B singers, she sang in a gospel choir when she was in school. However, she was not passionate about the experience, and decided to do it only because she was not good at sports, but still wanted to stay after school with her friends.

== Career ==
Blessett started doing background vocals, among others for R&B artists Monica and Bilal. This earned her a contract with Rowdy Records in Atlanta. She has toured with Anthony Hamilton, and collaborated with India.Arie. At a later age she learned to play the guitar, and started to do her own gigs in the Atlanta club scene. She writes her own songs.

Blessett released her first single, "U Do It For Me", on the Kedar Entertainment label in 2006. She released her first album, Purpose, in 2008.

In 2014, her sophomore effort Recovery was released.

=== Charts ===
Blessett's debut album Purpose was on the US Billboard R&B chart for 14 weeks, and reached No. 56. It also landed No. 37 on Heatseekers Albums.

Her second album, Recovery, was her debut on the Billboard 200, charting No. 149. It also entered No. 2 on Heatseekers Albums and No. 23 on Top R&B/Hip-Hop Albums.

== Discography ==
=== Albums ===
Title	Album details	Peak chart positions		
Title	Album details	US	US Heat.	US R&B/HH
Purpose	Released: February 26, 2008; Label: Kedar Records	—	37	56
Recovery	Released: 2013	149	2	23
"—" denotes a recording that did not chart or was not released in that territory.

=== Singles ===
- 2006: "U Do It For Me"
- 2008: "Run and Hide"
- 2012: "Black Gold" – credited as 'Esperanza Spalding with Algebra Blessett'
- 2013: "Nobody But You"
