= Kwamé =

American rapper

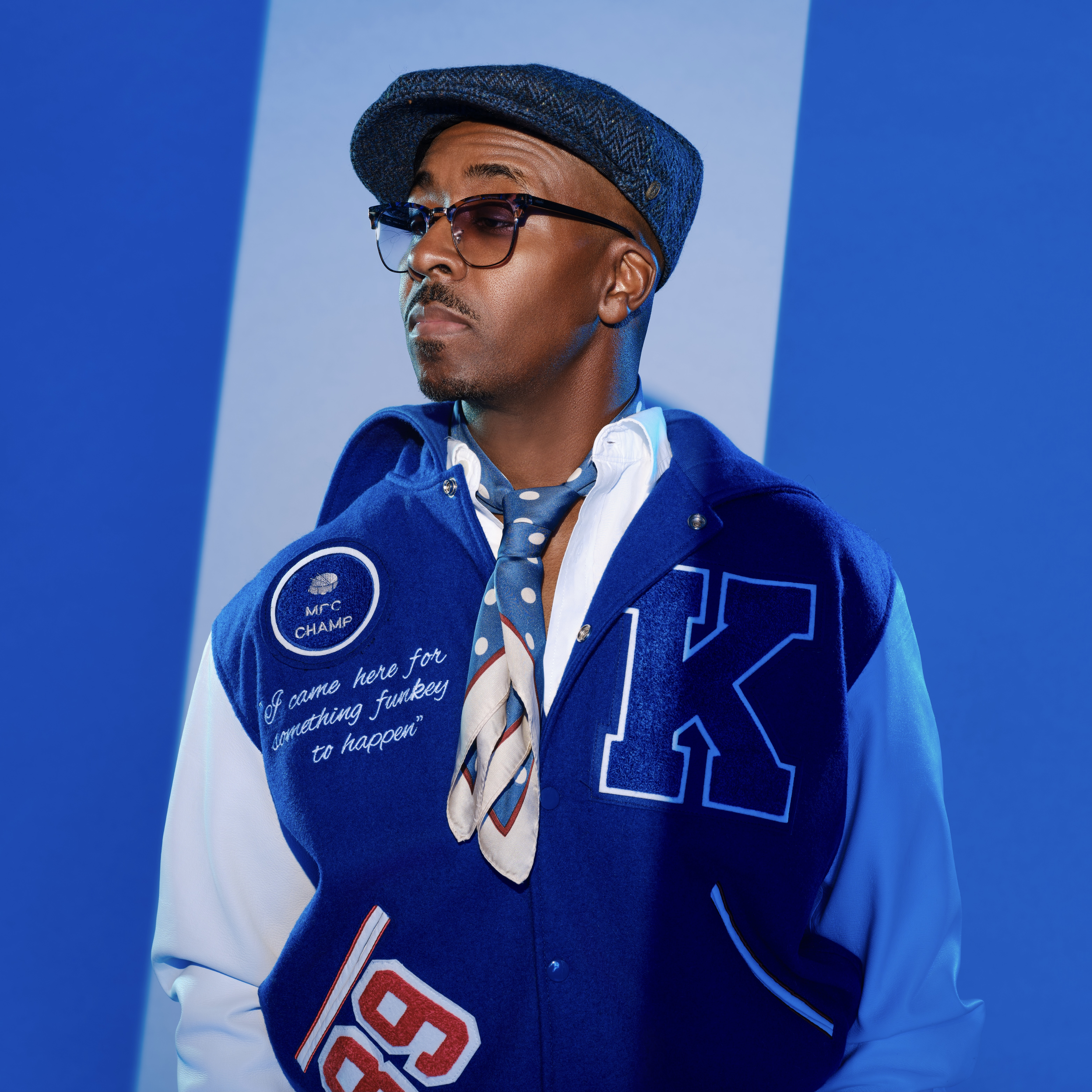
- Kwamé in 2025

Background information
- Also known as: K-1 Million; K1 Mil
- Born: Kwamé; Queens, New York City, U.S.
- Genres: Hip hop; R&B; pop
- Occupations: Rapper; singer; songwriter; record producer
- Years active: 1987–1995; 2001–present
- Labels: Wrap; Atlantic; Make Noise Recordings; SoNo Recording Group

Kwamé Holland is an American rapper, singer and record producer from East Elmhurst, Queens, New York. Starting as a rapper in the late 1980s, he later saw success as a producer.

== Biography ==
In 1989, Kwamé released his debut album, Kwamé the Boy Genius: Featuring a New Beginning, which he produced under the supervision of Hurby "Luv Bug" Azor. The title refers to his backing band, which was unusual for emcees at the time. The music videos featured a polka-dot motif in the costumes and production design. This became Kwamé's trademark and a hip hop fashion fad, as his fans began wearing it.

In 1990, Kwamé released his second album A Day in the Life: A Pokadelick Adventure, the first Hip Hop concept album about a day in the life of a high school student. The album spawned hit singles "Ownlee Eue." "Oneovdabigboiz" & "Hai Love (Heart symbol)", Ownlee Eue reached #2 on Billboard's Hip Hop and R&B charts.

In 1992, he released his third album, Nastee. This album was a departure for him, discarding the polka-dots and writing more sexually charged lyrics, in contrast to his previously playful, intellectual persona. The title track was a minor hit.

In 1994 Kwamé released his fourth album,Incognito.

In 2000, Kwamé reemerged as a record producer, sometimes working under the name K-1 Million. He produced for artists such as LL Cool J, Mary J. Blige, Keyshia Cole, Missy Elliott, and Christina Aguilera. In 2004, he co-produced (with Eminem) Lloyd Banks' hit song "On Fire." The single has been certified Gold by the RIAA. In 2005, he co-wrote and co-produced Tweet's single "Turn da Lights Off and Will Smith's single "Switch". As a producer, Kwamé has sold over 30 million records.

In 2012, Kwamé teamed up with Vin Diesel to help score his web series The Ropes.

Kwamé has also written scores and music for film and TV, including Drumline, Step Up 1 & 2, Freedom Writers, Coach Carter, and Fantastic Four and recently produced Vivian Green's fifth album Vivid. He has joined the hip hop group the Alumni, alongside Chubb Rock, Dana Dane, Special Ed, and Monie Love.

In 2015, Kwamé formed Make Noise Recordings. Distributed by Caroline Records, Kwamé signed R&B singer Vivian Green and released her fifth album, Vivid. He also garnered a top 2 R&B hit "Get Right Back To My Baby" and top 15 R&B Hit "Grown Folks Music (Work)".

In 2016, TV One aired an episode of Unsung featuring Kwamé, in which he scored all the music for his episode.

In 2017, Make Noise released Vivian Green's sixth album VGVI reaching No. 38 on the Billboard R&B albums chart. The single "I Don't Know" reached the top 10 on the Billboard adult R&B chart. In 2018, Make Noise released "Vibes", the second single from VGVI. This reached No. 12 on the Adult R&B chart.

In 2020, Make Noise teamed up with SoNo Recording Group to release Vivian Green's seventh album Love Absolute This album was met with high critic praise but failed to chart due to poor promotion and the pandemic shut down. The single "Where you are" .

In 2025, Kwamé via Make Noise / SRG/ILS / Virgin Music released his 5th album "The Different Kids" . The initial singles "Ms Mary Mack" and "Hello / Anybody?" are accompanied by Kwamé's first new visuals in 26 years.

== Personal life ==
Kwamé is an avid toy and comic book collector. He recently became co founder of L.B.O (Lets Be Onyx), a company composed of like minded creators whose mission is to add representation to the toy community. In 2026 Kwamé plans to open his vintage collectible store "Old Friends". He is also an illustrator and clothing designer.

== Discography (as artist) ==
=== Albums ===
- Kwamé the Boy Genius: Featuring a New Beginning (1989)
- A Day in the Life: A Pokadelick Adventure (1990)
- Nastee (1992)
- Incognito (1994, Ichiban Records)
- Break Beat Diaries (Instrumental Album) (2012, MAKE NOISE Recordings)
- The Different Kids (2025, MAKE NOISE Recordings)

=== Singles ===
Year	Title	Chart positions		Album
Year	Title	US Hot R&B	US Hot Rap	Album
1989	"The Man We All Know and Love"	33	2	Kwamé the Boy Genius featuring A New Beginning
1989	"The Rhythm"	—	7	Kwamé the Boy Genius featuring A New Beginning
1989	"Sweet Thang"	—	20	Kwamé the Boy Genius featuring A New Beginning
1990	"Ownleeeue"	33	3	A Day in the Life: A Pokadelick Adventure
1990	"Oneovdabigboiz"	40	3	A Day in the Life: A Pokadelick Adventure
1991	"Hai Love"	94	17	A Day in the Life: A Pokadelick Adventure
1992	"Nastee"	68	16	Nastee
1992	"Can U Feel It"	—	—	Nastee
1994	"? It Like"	—	20	Incognito
2025	"Ms Mary Mack"	—	—	The Different Kids
2025	"Hello / Anybody?"	—	—	The Different Kids
