= Osunlade =

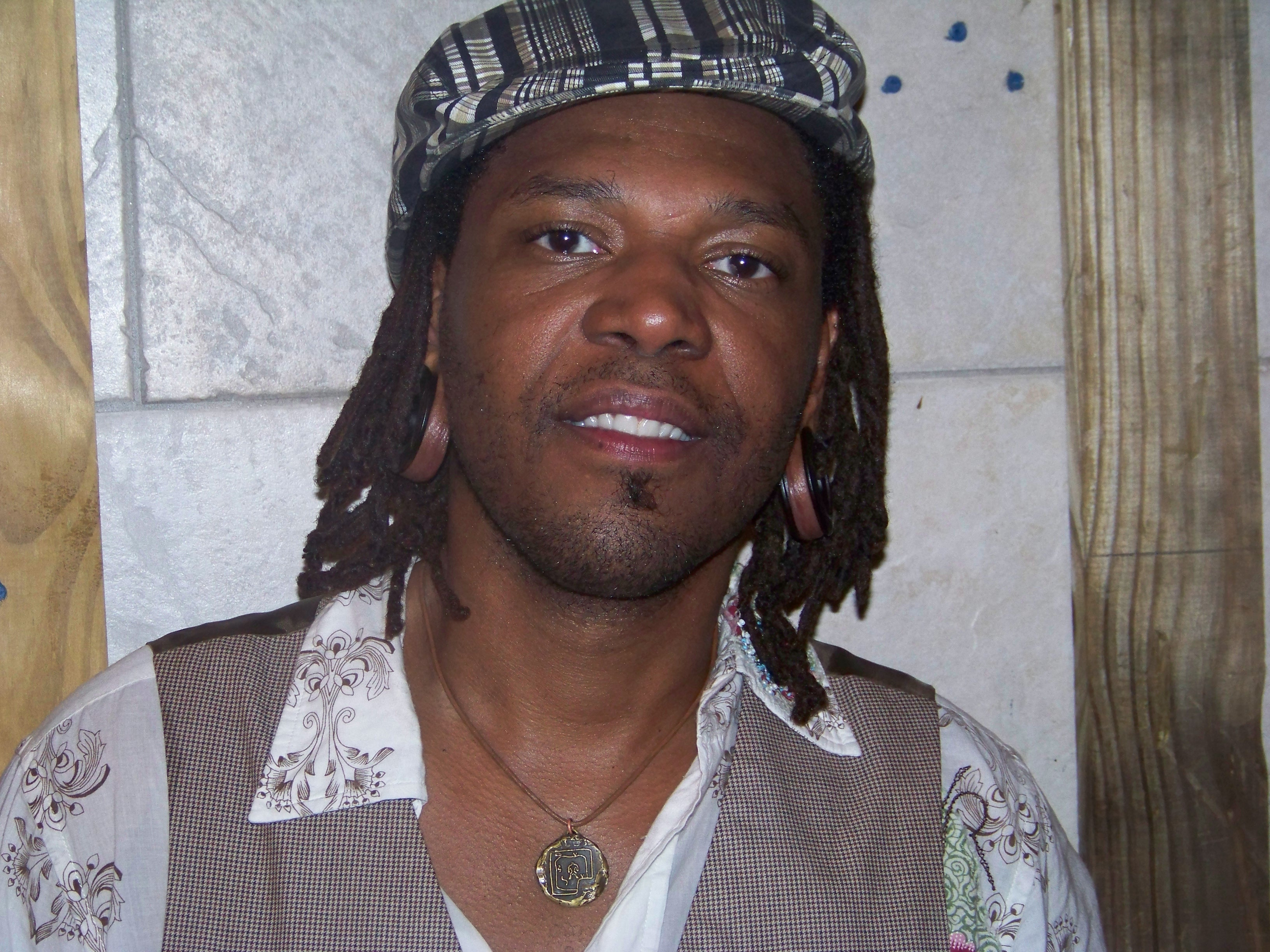

Background information
- Born: 13 March 1969 (age 57); St. Louis, Missouri, U.S.
- Genres: World, house
- Occupations: Musician, record producer
- Instruments: Piano, percussion, guitar, bass, vocals
- Years active: 1989–present
- Label: Yoruba Records
- Website: https://yorubarecords.bandcamp.com/

Osunlade (/ˌoʊsʊnˈlɑːdeɪ/; born March 13, 1969) is an American musician and music producer.

== Biography ==
Osunlade was born and raised in St. Louis, Missouri. He composed music for Sesame Street during the late 1980s and early 1990s. Afterward, he moved to Los Angeles, California, where he worked with artists such as Patti LaBelle and Freddie Jackson. After a stint there, he moved to New York, where he founded Yoruba Records because of "the continued need to create the music I wanted". To date, he has worked with such artists as Roy Ayers, Nkemdi, Salif Keita, Poranguí, and Cesária Évora. In 2006, he released the album Aquarian Moon; in 2007, he released the album Elements Beyond on the revived Strictly Rhythm label, and in 2009, he released the album Passage. He is a priest of the Yoruba religion of Ifá.

== Controversy ==
His performance at Irish festival All Together Now was cancelled in 2023, following complaints about public social media posts he made which were negative about transgender health care. Osunlade was dismissive of the cancellation, noting he would be paid regardless.

== Discography ==
=== Albums ===
- 2000 Yoruba Records: El Primer Año
- 2001 Paradigm
- 2006 Aquarian Moon
- 2007 Elements Beyond
- 2010 Rebirth
- 2011 Pyrography
- 2013 A Man with No Past Originating the Future
- 2014 Peacock
- 2020 Basic Sketches for Beginners
- 2025 INvite ONly

=== Singles ===
- 1999 "Native Tongue"
- 2000 "Beats de los Muertos Vol. 1"
- 2000 "Power to Conquer/Aldeia de Ogum" (as Latina Café)
- 2001 "Cantos a Ochun et Oya"
- 2001 "Diamant"
- 2001 "Rader Du/Blackman" (with Wunmi)
- 2001 "The Deep"
- 2001 "Versatile Family Sampler"
- 2002 "Obatala Y Oduduwa"
- 2002 "Native Tongue Revisited" (with Jaffa)
- 2002 "Beloved"
- 2002 "Pride" (with Nadirah Shakoor)
- 2002 "New Day" (as Atelewo)
- 2003 "Chimes of Freedom" (as Atelewo)
- 2004 "The Year of the Monkey"
- 2004 "Pride (Remixes)" (with Nadirah Shakoor)
- 2004 "Same Thing" (with Maiya James)
- 2005 "The Fifth Dimension"
- 2005 "New Day/Macaco" (as Atelewo)
- 2006 "Flow/Sokinsikartep"
- 2006 "I Don't Know"
- 2006 "Everything in Its Right Place" (with Erro)
- 2007 "April"
- 2008 "Momma's Groove"
- 2008 "My Reflection" (with Divine Essence)
- 2012 "Envision" (Defected Records)

=== Mixed compilations ===
- 2002 Offering
- 2005 Re-Offering
- 2006 Soul Heaven (with DJ Spen)
- 2008 Passage
- 2009 Mix the Vibe: King Street Goes Yoruba
- 2012 Defected Presents Osunlade in the House
- 2014 Atonement

=== Productions for other artists ===
- 1991 Gerardo - "Rico Suave", "Fandango" (programming, composer, additional production)
- 1994 BlackGirl - "90's Girl" (original version), "Nubian Prince"
- 1994 Freddie Jackson - "Was It Something"
- 1994 Eric Gable - "Process of Elimination"
- 1996 Eric Benét - "Femininity"
- 1997 Martha Wash - "Come"
- 2000 Musiq Soulchild - "Mary Go Round"
- 2001 Eric Roberson - "Change for Me"
- 2002 DJ Jazzy Jeff feat. Erro - "Rock wit U"
- 2003 Vivian Green - "Emotional Rollercoaster"
- 2005 Nadirah Shakoor - "Just a Breath Away"
- 2006 Nadirah Shakoor - "Love Song"
