= Eric Roberson =

American singer-songwriter (born 1973)

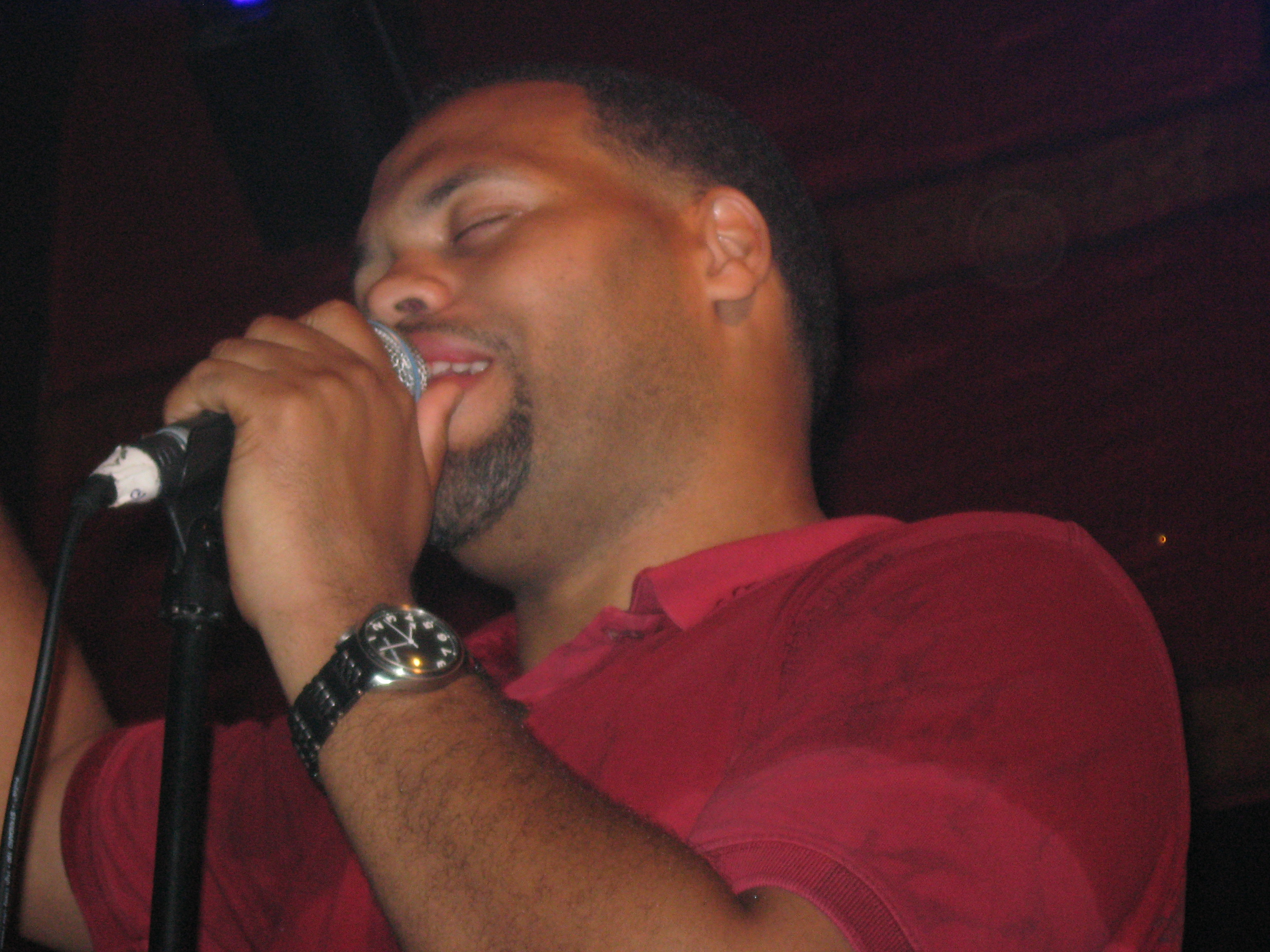
- Roberson performing in 2007

Background information
- Born: September 27, 1973 (age 53); Rahway, New Jersey, United States
- Genres: R&B, neo soul, indie soul
- Occupations: Singer-songwriter, record producer, rapper
- Instruments: Vocals, Fender Rhodes, drum machine
- Years active: 1994–present
- Labels: Warner Bros., Blue Erro Soul, Purpose, E1 Music, Liaison, SoNo Recording Group
- Website: Ericrobersonmusic.com

Eric Roberson (born September 27, 1973) is an American singer, songwriter, former rapper and music producer. He is sometimes referred to simply as Erro, the name that he later used as part of his label Blue Erro Soul. His first single, "The Moon", was released through Warner Bros. Records in 1994 and he recorded an album for that label which remains unreleased.

== Career ==
Raised in Rahway, New Jersey, Roberson attended Rahway High School.

He subsequently returned to Howard University to complete his studies in Musical Theatre. After performing in a number of musicals and plays, he landed a songwriting deal through the EMI label, and went on to collaborate with Philadelphia-based artists such as Jill Scott, Musiq Soulchild, and most extensively, DJ Jazzy Jeff.

As a member of Jeff's A Touch of Jazz production company, Roberson made contributions to Jeff's debut album, The Magnificent in 2002. He continued songwriting work as well as releasing his own material through his Blue Erro Soul imprint. He also appeared on DJ Spinna's Intergalactic Soul LP in 2006.

Roberson was nominated for two Grammys in the Best Urban/Alternative Performance category. He was nominated for two songs from his 2009 album Music Fan First- "A Tale of Two" in 2010 and "Still" in the same category a year later.

In 2013, he was a member of the band, United Tenors together with Dave Hollister, Fred Hammond and Brian Courtney Wilson.

Roberson's 2014 album, The Box, peaked at No. 8 on the Billboard Top R&B Albums chart. It was on the chart for three weeks. The album reached No. 104 on the Billboard 200. The album cover and promotional material featured speakers by BoomCase.

Roberson's "I Have a Song" was chosen to be the fundraising single, produced by Jak Beula and released in February 2016, to enable the permanent installation of the first dedicated Commonwealth war memorial in the UK to African and Caribbean service men and women of both World Wars.

In 2024, Roberson signed with the Universal Music Group distributed label SoNo Recording Group. His first release for the label is the Jeff Lorber featured "Every Kinda People", a cover of the 1978 Robert Palmer single.

== Studio albums ==
List of studio albums, with selected chart positions, sales figures and certifications
Year	Album details	Peak chart positions	
Year	Album details	US	US R&B
2001	The Esoteric Movement: Released: June 15, 2001; Label: P-Vine	–	–
2003	The Vault, Vol. 1: Released: July 1, 2003; Label: Blue Erro Soul	–	–
2004	The Vault, Vol. 1.5: Released: February 24, 2004; Label: Blue Erro Soul	–	–
2005	The Appetizer: Released: November 7, 2005; Label: Blue Erro Soul	–	–
2007	...Left: Released: February 27, 2007; Label: Blue Erro Soul	–	–
2009	Music Fan First: Released: August 25, 2009; Label: Blue Erro Soul	–	89
2011	Mister Nice Guy: Released: September 5, 2011; Label: Purpose, eOne Music	-	85
2012	Eric Roberson Prestons When Loves Calls: Released: February 2, 2012; Label: Blue Erro Soul/Purpose Records/E1 Music(US), Dome Records(UK)	98	14
2013	United Tenors (with Fred Hammond, Dave Hollister, Brian Courtney Wilson): Released: March 22, 2013; Label: Verity/RCA Inspiration	39	–
2014	B-Sides, Features & Heartaches: Released: February 4, 2014; Label: Blue Erro Soul/Liaison (US), Dome Records (UK)	–	45
2014	The Box: Released: August 12, 2014; Label: Blue Erro Soul/Liaison (US), Dome Records (UK)	104	19
2016	Tigallerro (with Phonte): Released: July 22, 2016; Label: Blue Erro Soul/Foreign Exchange Music	–	19
2017	Earth – EP: Released: April 21, 2017; Label: Blue Erro Soul	–	–
2017	Wind – EP: Released: July 21, 2017; Label: Blue Erro Soul	–	–
2017	Fire – EP: Released: October 20, 2017; Label: Blue Erro Soul	–	–
2020	Hear From Here: Released: April 3, 2020; Label: Blue Erro Soul	–	–
2022	Lessons: Released: April 1, 2022; Label: Blue Erro Soul	–	–
2025	Beautifully All Over the Place: Released: July 23, 2025; Label: Blue Erro Soul	–	–

== Live albums ==
Year	Album	Peak chart positions		Certifications
Year	Album	U.S.	U.S. R&B	Certifications
2006	Erro Live Vol. DC: Released: August 10, 2006; Label: Blue Erro Soul	–	–	

== Selected discography ==
- Phajja - Seize the Moment (1997), "So Long" (writer)
- 112 – Room 112 (1998), "Funny Feelings" (writer)
- Wild Wild West (1999), Tra-Knox "Lucky Day" (writer), Kel Spencer featuring Richie Sambora "I'm Wanted" (background vocals), Neutral "Chocolate Form" (writer)
- Gina Thompson – If You Only Knew (1999), "Ya Di Ya" (writer), "Take My Number Down" (writer, background vocals)
- Will Smith – Willennium (1999), "I'm Comin'" (vocal production)
- Jill Scott – Who Is Jill Scott? Words and Sounds Vol. 1 (2000), "Getting In The Way" (background vocals)
- Musiq Soulchild – Aijuswanaseing (2000), "Mary Go Round" (writer, vocal arrangements)
- Will Downing – All the Man You Need (2000), "Thinkin' About You" (writer, background vocals)
- Case – Open Letter (2001), "Driving" (writer, background vocals), "Love Of My Life" (writer), "Wishful Thinking" (writer)
- Vivian Green – A Love Story (2002), "What Is Love?" (writer, background vocals), "Emotional Rollercoaster" (writer, background vocals), "Ain't Nothing But Love" (writer, background vocals)
- Musiq Soulchild – Juslisen (2002), "Previouscats" (writer, background vocals)
- Cam'ron – Come Home with Me (2002), "Tomorrow" (writer, uncredited background vocals)
- Dwele – Subject (2003), "Hold On" (writer, background vocals, vocal production)
- Carl Thomas – Let's Talk About It (2004), "Rebound" (writer, producer)
- Charlie Wilson – Charlie, Last Name Wilson (2005), "Thru It All" (writer)
- Phonte – Charity Starts at Home (2011), "Who Loves You More" (vocals)
- The Foreign Exchange – Love in Flying Colors (2013), "Better" (vocals)
- Robert Glasper – Black Radio 2 (2013), "Big Girl Body" (vocals)
- Algebra Blessett – Recovery (2014), "Mystery" (writer)
- Lil' John Roberts – The Heartbeat (2014), "Space" (vocals)
- AverySunshine – Twenty Sixty Four (2017), "Heaven Is Right Here" (writer), "Twenty Sixty Four" (writer)
- Phonte – No News Is Good News (2018), "Find That Love Again" (vocals)
- Brandon Williams – The Love Factor (2019) "Don't Give Up on Love" (vocals)
- Zo! – FourFront (2019) – "Love Up" (vocals)
- Nao Yoshioka – Undeniable (2019) – "Invest in Me feat. Carolyn Malachi" (producer)

== Compilations ==
- "Couldn't Hear Me" appears on the compilation Gilles Peterson Worldwide Exclusives 3 (2004) Talking Loud.

== Awards and nominations ==
Year	Award	Artist/work	Category	Result	Ref.
2006	SoulTracks Readers' Choice Awards	The Appetizer	Album of the Year	Won	
2006	SoulTracks Readers' Choice Awards	Eric Roberson	Male Vocalist of the Year	Won	
2007	BET Awards	Eric Roberson	BET Cool Like That Award	Nominated	
2007	SoulTracks Readers' Choice Awards	Left	Album of the Year	Nominated	
2007	SoulTracks Readers' Choice Awards	"Pretty Girl"	Song of the Year	Nominated	
2007	SoulTracks Readers' Choice Awards	Eric Roberson	Male Vocalist of the Year	Nominated	
2009	Soul Train Music Awards	Eric Roberson	CENTRIC Award	Nominated	
2009	SoulTracks Readers' Choice Awards	Music Fan First	Album of the Year	Won	
2009	SoulTracks Readers' Choice Awards	"Dealing" with Lalah Hathaway	Song of the Year	Won	
2009	SoulTracks Readers' Choice Awards	"The Power that Kisses Hold"	Song of the Year	Nominated	
2009	SoulTracks Readers' Choice Awards	Eric Roberson	Male Vocalist of the Year	Won	
2010	Grammy Awards	"A Tale of Two" feat. Ben O'Neill & Michelle Thompson	Best Urban/Alternative Performance	Nominated	
2011	Grammy Awards	"Still"	Best Urban/Alternative Performance	Nominated	
2012	SoulTracks Readers' Choice Awards	Mr. Nice Guy	Album of the Year	Nominated	
2012	SoulTracks Readers' Choice Awards	"At the Same Time"	Song of the Year	Nominated	
2012	SoulTracks Readers' Choice Awards	Eric Roberson	Male Vocalist of the Year	Nominated	
2014	SoulTracks Readers' Choice Awards	The Box	Album of the Year	Nominated	
2014	SoulTracks Readers' Choice Awards	"Mark on Me"	Song of the Year	Nominated	
2014	SoulTracks Readers' Choice Awards	Eric Roberson	Male Vocalist of the Year	Nominated	
2017	SoulTracks Readers' Choice Awards	Wind	Album of the Year	Nominated	
2017	SoulTracks Readers' Choice Awards	Eric Roberson	Male Vocalist of the Year	Nominated	
2021	SoulTracks Readers' Choice Awards	"Lessons"	Song of the Year	Won	
2022	Pop Awards	"Lessons"	Song of the Year	Nominated	
2022	SoulTracks Readers' Choice Awards	Lessons	Album of the Year	Won	
2022	SoulTracks Readers' Choice Awards	Eric Roberson	Male Vocalist of the Year	Won	
