= Emotional Rollercoaster (song) =

Single by Vivian Green

from the album A Love Story
- Released: October 15, 2002
- Recorded: 2002
- Genre: R&B; soul; neo soul
- Length: 3:17
- Label: Columbia
- Songwriters: Vivian Green; Eric Roberson; Osunlade
- Producer: Junius Bervine

Vivian Green singles chronology
| "Emotional Rollercoaster" (2002) | "Fanatic" (2003) |

Music video
- "Emotional Rollercoaster" on YouTube

"Emotional Rollercoaster" is a song co-written and performed by American contemporary R&B singer Vivian Green, issued as the lead single from her debut studio album A Love Story. It is her only hit to date on the Billboard Hot 100, peaking at #39 in 2003. A remixed version of the song also peaked at #1 on the Billboard dance chart.

== Music video ==
The official music video for the song was directed by Scott Stewart.

== Charts ==
=== Weekly charts ===
| Chart (2002–2003) | Peak position |
|---|---|
| US Billboard Hot 100 | 39 |
| US Dance Club Songs (Billboard) remix | 1 |
| US Hot R&B/Hip-Hop Songs (Billboard) | 13 |

=== Year-end charts ===
| Chart (2003) | Position |
|---|---|
| US Hot R&B/Hip-Hop Songs (Billboard) | 46 |
