= House Party (franchise) =

American film franchise

- Official franchise logo, as first released in 1990.
- Based on: Characters created by Reginald Hudlin
- Distributed by: New Line Cinema; Warner Bros. Pictures
- Country: United States
- Language: English
- Budget: >$7,500,000; Total (2 films)
- Box office: ≥$45,825,756; Total (2 films)

The House Party franchise consists of American comedies, based on a short film written/directed by Reginald Hudlin in 1990. The franchise consists of the original short film, three theatrical releases (the first film and its first two sequels), two straight-to-home video sequels, and one theatrical continuation movie. The events of each installment centers around high school teenagers, who are tasked with responsible duties ranging from studying for class to house-sitting, but instead go against the regimented instructions and plan large parties to increase their popularity at school; while eventually leading to comedic unfortunate circumstances. The plot additionally involves these characters' attempts to fame, in the Hip-hop/Rap music industry.

The short was received in 1983 with warm reception, with Kevin Thomas of the Los Angeles Times stating: "Reginald Hudlin's House Party!, [is] a stylish and witty look at teen-age behavior...", which spawned the overall franchise. The first theatrical film that followed was met with critical acclaim, and has since been credited as noteworthy of a milestone in African American representation and affluence in film history. With its historical significance, House Party has since been labeled and earned its status as cult classic. The sequels that followed have been met with respective diminishing reception, with criticisms pointed at their quality, when compared to the original release.

The franchise continues with the release of House Party.

Christopher Martin, Christopher Reid and Tisha Campbell were the only actors to have appeared in all the original first three House Party films.

== Films ==
Film	U.S. release date	Director(s)	Screenwriter(s)	Producer(s)
House Party	March 9, 1990	Reginald Hudlin	Reginald Hudlin	Warrington Hudlin
House Party 2	October 23, 1991	Doug McHenry & George Jackson	Daryl G. Nickens & Rusty Cundieff	Doug McHenry, George Jackson, Janet Grillo, Pat Golden and Suzanne Broderick
House Party 3	January 12, 1994	Eric Meza	David Toney & Takashi Bufford	Carl Craig, Cindy Hornickel, Doug McHenry, George Jackson, Helena Echegoyen and Janet Grillo
House Party 4: Down to the Last Minute	August 14, 2001	Chris Stokes	Marcus Warren & Chris Stokes	Cassius Weathersby
House Party: Tonight's the Night	July 23, 2013	Darin Scott	Don D. Scott	Doug McHenry
House Party	January 13, 2023	Charles "Calmatic" Kidd II	Stephen Glover & Jamal Olori	LeBron James and Maverick Carter

=== House Party (1990) ===
Play's parents are out of town, and he's planning a house party to end all others. His best friend named Kid wants to attend more than anything as the prettiest and most popular girl at school, Sydney, will also be there. They work together to plan something memorable, but when Kid gets into a fight at school, his father grounds him. Determined to no miss out on the event of the school-year, Kid rebelliously sneaks out of the house and faces a series of unfortunate circumstances as he make his way to the party. Kid strives to ensure he arrives, before the party is over.

=== House Party 2 (1991) ===
Rapper-turned-scholar Kid, gets accepted into collegiate schooling. Excited for the new adventure, he quickly hits a stumbling block when he runs out of cash as classes are about to start. Desperate for funds, he looks for ways to earn money. After spending some time working at the school cafeteria, Kid decides to plan another party with Play. Together, the friends organize a late-night event where the women can enter by dressing scantily clad, while men must pay to enter. As the party begins, one event after the last causes issues. The friends work together to ensure that Kid makes the money he is in need of.

=== House Party 3 (1994) ===
After their share of exploits, best friends Kid and Play are faced with growing up. Kid is marrying his girlfriend Veda, and Play is doing his best to continue having success in the music industry. Kid works with his fiancé in preparing for the wedding; Play plans a bachelor party while also attending to his trouble-making younger cousins while also managing a new all-female rap group called Sex as a Weapon. The friends strive to create successful events, all while moving on into adulthood.

=== House Party 4: Down to the Last Minute (2001) ===
The teenage, musical-aspiring Jon "Jon-Jon" Harris, Jr. volunteers for the responsibility of house-sitting his wealthy Uncle Charles Lester's mansion. While the latter is away on a business trip, Jon-Jon is asked to have no visitors nor to drive his uncle's platinum colored Mercedes-Benz 430 luxury vehicle. Jon-Jon calls his two best friends Mark and T, collectively known as the hip hop group named IMx, and together they enjoy the comforts of his uncle's income. The trio take the car for a drive after getting caught up in the aspirations of popularity, and plan a party for all of their classmates. The group convince a record label executive to attend the entertainment event, and rehearse their routine for their performance. As the event begins and their concert rages, Jon-Jon discovers that his uncle is coming home sooner than expected. The friends race against time, attempting to get everything back to the way it was, hiding their hijinks while he was away.

=== House Party: Tonight's the Night (2013) ===
Chris Johnson and his best friend Dylan are two teenage amateur rappers. As their high school experience comes to an end, Chris prepares to go to college. Together they realize that their chance for a final experience with their peers is immanent. The pair plan their party, while Chris tries to finally win the affections of the girl he has had a crush on since their time in second grade; Autumn Rose. As the party commences, with local celebrity hip-hop artists Christopher "Kid" Robinson, Jr. and Peter "Play" Martin in attendance, a series of unexpected disasters ensue. Chris and Dylan work together, to salvage the night as best they can.

=== House Party (2023) ===
In February 2018, it was announced that a relaunch of the House Party film series was in development. With a script co-written by Stephen Glover and Jamal Olori, the story is described as: "definitely not a reboot. It's an entirely new...House Party." LeBron James and Maverick Carter are signed as producers. The project will be a joint-venture production between Warner Bros. Pictures, New Line Cinema, SpringHill Company and HBO Max Original Films. The film is intended to be released exclusively on HBO Max via streaming. In September 2019, Charles "Calmatic" Kidd II signed onto the production as director, marking the filmmakers feature film directorial debut. Principal photography commenced in July 2021. In August 2022, the movie was rescheduled for a theatrical release, after previously having been scheduled for July 28, 2022 release exclusively via streaming. It was also previously scheduled for a December 9, 2022 release.

It was released on January 13, 2023.

== Short film ==
Written/directed/produced by Reginal Hudlin as a 20-minute short as a thesis during his time as a college student at Harvard University, House Party! was released independently by the filmmaker. It is known for centering around a teenager who defies the wishes of his strict father and sneaks out of his house at night to attend a party with his friends and peers.

Despite its indie-distribution, Hudlin's short received recognition by winning first place with a $1,500 total prize at the fourth annual Black Independent Video and Film-maker's Awards sponsored by which is related to the official film archives of the Western States Black Research Center. Following the successes of the short film, Reginald Hudlin and his brother Warrington Hudlin started developing the script for a feature film adaptation, at the request of New Line Cinema.

== Main cast and characters ==
List indicators

This section includes characters who will appear or have appeared in the franchise in main roles.

- An empty grey cell indicates the character was not in the film, or that the character's official presence has not yet been confirmed.
- ^{A} indicates an appearance through archival footage or audio.
- ^{P} indicates an appearance in onscreen photographs.

Character
Character	Short film	Film					
Character	House Party!	House Party (1990)	House Party 2	House Party 3	House Party 4: Down to the Last Minute	House Party: Tonight's the Night	House Party (2023)
Principal cast
Christopher "Kid" Robinson, Jr.		Christopher "Kid" Reid	Christopher "Kid" Reid	Christopher "Kid" Reid		Christopher "Kid" Reid	
Peter "Play" Martin		Christopher "Play" Martin	Christopher "Play" Martin	Christopher "Play" Martin		Christopher "Play" Martin	
Christopher "Pops" Robinson, Sr.		Robin Harris	Robin Harris^{A}^{P}	Robin Harris^{P}			
Bilal		Martin Lawrence	Martin Lawrence				
Stab		Paul Anthony George	Paul Anthony George				
Pee-Wee		Lucien "Bow-Legged Lou" George, Jr.	Lucien "Bow-Legged Lou" George, Jr.				
Zilla		Brian "B-Fine" George	Brian "B-Fine" George				
Sidney		Tisha Campbell	Tisha Campbell	Tisha Campbell			
Groove		Gene "Groove" Allen	Gene "Groove" Allen				
Chill		Daryl "Chill" Mitchell	Daryl "Chill" Mitchell				
Sylvester "Vester" Robinson				Bernie Mac			
Jon "Jon-Jon" Harris, Jr.					Marques "Batman" Houston		
Mark					Jerome "Young Rome" Jones		
T					Kelton "LDB" Kessee		
Monique Harris					Alexis Fields		
Judy Harris					Kym Whitley		
Charles Harris					Roland "Buddy" Lewis		
Jon Harris, Sr.					Dorien Wilson		
Grandma Harris					Irene Stokes		
Chris Johnson						Tequan Richmond	
Dylan						Zac Goodspeed	
Autumn Rose						Tristin Mays	
Melvin Johnson						Gary Anthony Williams	
Mimi Johnson						Jacqui Achilleas	
Kevin							Jacob Latimore
Damon							Tosin Cole
Supporting cast
E.Z.E. / Butcher		Anthony Johnson		Anthony Johnson			
Jamal			Ron "Kamron" Winge				
Sheila Landreaux			Iman Abdulmajid				
Zora			Dana "Queen Latifah" Owens				
Miles			D. Christopher Judge				
Mr. Lee			Tony Burton				
the Professor			Whoopi Goldberg				
Veda				Angela Means			
Johnny Booze				Chris Tucker			
Aunt Lucy Robinson				Ketty Lester			
Janelle				Khandi Alexander			
Marques "Batman" Houston				Himself			
Jerome "Romeo" Jones				Himself			
Don "Half-Pint" Santos				Himself			
the Luggage Clerk				Gilbert Gottfried			
Sex as a Weapon				Tionne "T-Boz" Watkins, Rozonda "Chilli" Thomas, Lisa "Left Eye" Lopes			
Tina					Meagan Good		
Heidi					Jamal "Hercules" Mixon		
Bertha					Jerod "Big Time" Mixon		
Tracey						Julie Hartley	
Morgan						Alex McGregor	
Quentin						Keith Powers	

== Additional crew and production details ==
Title	Crew/Detail					
Title	Composer(s)	Cinematographer	Editor	Production companies	Distributing companies	Running time
House Party!	Reginald Hudlin	Marco Williams	Reginald Hudlin	Reginald Hudlin Independent Film	Black Independent Video and Film-maker's Awards	20mins
House Party (1990)	Lenny White & Marcus Miller	Peter Deming	Earl Watson	New Line Cinema, The Jackson/McHenry Company, The Hudlin Brothers	New Line Cinema	1hr 40mins
House Party 2	Vassal Benford	Francis Kenny	Joel Goodman	New Line Cinema, The Jackson/McHenry Company, The Hudlin Brothers	New Line Cinema	1hr 34mins
House Party 3	David Allen Jones	Anghel Decca	Tom Walls	New Line Cinema, The Jackson/McHenry Company, The Hudlin Brothers	New Line Cinema	1r 40mins
House Party 4: Down to the Last Minute	Tom Moore	Todd A. Dos Reis	Chris Maybach	New Line Cinema, Ultimate Group Films	New Line Home Video	1hr 20mins
House Party: Tonight's the Night	Michael Corcoran & Eric Goldman	Thomas L. Callaway	Tony Lombardo	Warner Premiere, Film Afrika Worldwide, Market Street Productions	Warner Premiere, Warner Home Entertainment	1hr 29mins
House Party (2023)	Oak Felder	Andrew Huebscher	Matthew Barbato	Warner Bros. Pictures, New Line Cinema, SpringHill Entertainment	Warner Bros. Pictures	1hr 41mins

== Reception ==
=== Box office and financial performance ===
Title	Box office gross	Box office ranking		Home video total	Gross income	Budget	Net income	Ref.
Title	Worldwide	All time North America	All time worldwide	Home video total	Gross income	Budget	Net income	Ref.
House Party!	—N/a	—N/a	—N/a	—N/a	$1,500	Figures not publicly available	≤$1,500	
House Party (1990)	$26,385,627	#3,083	#4,342	Figures not publicly available	>$26,385,627	$2,500,000	>$23,885,627	
House Party 2	$19,438,638	#3,739	#5,189	Figures not publicly available	>$19,438,638	$5,000,000	>14,438,638	
House Party 3	$19,281,235	Figures not publicly available	Figures not publicly available	Figures not publicly available	Figures not publicly available	Figures not publicly available	Figures not publicly available	
House Party 4: Down to the Last Minute	—N/a	—N/a	—N/a	Figures not publicly available	Figures not publicly available	Figures not publicly available	Figures not publicly available	
House Party: Tonight's the Night	—N/a	—N/a	—N/a	Figures not publicly available	Figures not publicly available	Figures not publicly available	Figures not publicly available	
House Party (2023)	$7,185,508	#6,366	#9,468	Figures not publicly available	>$7.3,000,000	TBA	>$3,985,882	
Totals	$45,824,265	x̄975	x̄1,362	Figures not publicly available	≥$45,825,756	>$7,500,000	≤$45,825,756	

=== Critical and public response ===
Film	Rotten Tomatoes	Metacritic
House Party (1990)	94% (31 reviews)	76/100 (15 reviews)
House Party 2	27% (15 reviews)	—N/a
House Party 3	0% (10 reviews)	—N/a
House Party 4: Down to the Last Minute	—N/a (2 reviews)	—N/a
House Party: Tonight's the Night	—N/a (1 review)	—N/a
House Party (2023)	28% (39 reviews)	41/100 (15 reviews)
