= House Party 2 =

1991 film by Doug McHenry and George Jackson

- Theatrical release poster
- Directed by: Doug McHenry; George Jackson
- Written by: Daryl G. Nickens; Rusty Cundieff
- Based on: Characters created by Reginald Hudlin
- Produced by: Doug McHenry; George Jackson; Janet Grillo; Pat Golden; Suzanne Broderick
- Starring: Kid 'n Play; Full Force; Tisha Campbell; Iman; Queen Latifah; Georg Stanford Brown; Tony! Toni! Toné!; Ralph Tresvant; Martin Lawrence
- Cinematography: Francis Kenny
- Edited by: Joel Goodman
- Music by: Vassal Benford
- Distributed by: New Line Cinema
- Release date: October 23, 1991
- Running time: 94 minutes
- Country: United States
- Language: English
- Budget: $5 million
- Box office: $19.4 million

House Party 2 is a 1991 American comedy film and the second in the House Party film series. Kid 'n Play, Full Force, Tisha Campbell, and Martin Lawrence reprise their roles from the first film, with Iman, Queen Latifah, and Georg Stanford Brown joining the cast with guest appearances by Tony! Toni! Toné! and Ralph Tresvant. It was directed by Doug McHenry and George Jackson, and written by Daryl G. Nickens and Rusty Cundieff.

In contrast to the original which takes place within 24 hours, the film places less focus on the party aspect of the plot and more on the characters' personal lives, from dating to education and career ambitions during the fall semester of college. The setting is a college pajama party rather than a high school house party. House Party 2 was released in the United States on October 23, 1991, and grossed $19 million on a budget of $5 million. A further sequel, House Party 3, was released in 1994.

== Plot ==
After high school graduation and his father's death, Kid, with scholarship money provided by the congregation of his church, goes off to college with his girlfriend, Sidney. Play, now driving a 'ForPlay' Ford Mustang instead of his beat up old wagon, meets Sheila Landreaux and her associate Rick. Really a con artist, Sheila convinces Play she is a record executive who would like to sign him and Kid, he just has to put some money down first for a studio session.

Lured by dreams of stardom, Play signs over Kid's college scholarship check. Unaware of this, Kid starts school and meets his roommate Jamal Johnson, a white kid obsessed with all things Black. Kid eventually finds out what Play did and fights him. Unable to pay his tuition and enrollment fees, Kid tries to reason with the dean but is only given a week to gather the money he needs. The dean's assistant, Miles, helps Kid with an extension and a job in the dining hall, working for Mr. Lee, a man who runs the hall like a military officer.

Kid struggles having to work to pay for school as well as writing a paper for the demanding Professor Sinclair. To top it off, Kid is hunted by his high school bullies, Stab, Zilla, and Pee Wee, who take jobs as campus security. Finding his groove on campus, Kid's perseverance pays off, and he gains the trust of his boss & professor. Meanwhile, Play is unable to get the money back from the con artists in time to pay for Kid's tuition. Plus, Sidney breaks up with Kid and starts dating Miles, who only helped Kid in order to take his money and get close to Sidney.

In order to raise the money he needs and win back Sidney, Kid, Play, Bilal and Jamal secretly hold a pajama themed party for the students in the faculty dining hall. For this, Kid steals the hall's key. Admission is $10 for men and free for women who wear nightwear. Stab, Zilla & Pee Wee try to get information on the party by pretending to be students, but their antics are unsuccessful. The party is a success as hundreds of students turn up wearing elaborate costumes and dance the night away amidst popular acts, including to a performance by Kid and Play.

Eventually, Play sees the con artists trying to coerce Zora, Sidney’s socially conscious cousin/roommate. Meanwhile, Kid sees Miles with Sidney trying to drug her. Kid, Play and campus security run upstairs to stop the con artists and Miles. Kid fights Miles on the roof. The dean and the police come in to stop the party. Play tells the dean that Sheila and Rick stole Kid’s check. They, along with Miles, are arrested.

The dean tells Kid, Play, Bilal, and Jamal to clean up the hall, or Kid will face expulsion. Confronted by Mr. Lee for unauthorized use of the hall, Kid confesses his financial troubles and gives him the money for the damages. With all of his options exhausted, Kid still has to drop out of school and visits his father's grave to try to sort things out. Play shows up trying to talk to Kid who is still disappointed with his best friend for causing him to drop out of college.

Meanwhile, Kid heads back to his dorm room to move his things out. Sidney & Jamal help to console him. Kid visits Mr. Lee on good terms and then Sinclair, who encourages him to return one day for his education. Later, Play arrives in his beat up old wagon, and gives Kid money, feeling guilty about using his check. Revealing he sold 'ForPlay' for Kid, Play apologizes for everything. Kid wants to go out and celebrate with him and Bilal, but Play tells him to hit the books, saying he is gonna visit the university periodically, seeing as Kid is his "investment" now. Jamal helps Kid move back in as Play drives off into the sunset.

== Cast ==
- Christopher Reid as Christopher "Kid" Robinson, Jr.
- Christopher Martin as Peter "Play" Martin
- Paul Anthony George as Stab
- Lucien "Bowlegged Lou" George, Jr. as Pee-Wee
- Brian "B-Fine" George as Zilla
- Tisha Campbell as Sidney
- Iman as Sheila Landreaux
- Queen Latifah as Zora Henderson
- Georg Stanford Brown as Prof. Sinclair
- Helen Martin as Mrs. Deevers
- William Schallert as Dean Kramer
- Kamron as Jamal Johnson
- Tony! Toni! Toné! as themselves
- Ralph Tresvant as himself
- Martin Lawrence as Bilal
- Tony Burton as Mr. Lee
- Louie Louie as Rick
- Christopher Judge as Miles (credited as D. Christopher Judge)
- Whoopi Goldberg as the Professor

== Music ==
=== Soundtrack ===
A soundtrack containing hip hop and R&B music was released on October 15, 1991 by MCA Records. It peaked at 55 on the Billboard 200 and 23 on the Top R&B/Hip-Hop Albums, becoming the most successful of the House Party soundtracks.

== Reception ==
=== Box office ===
The movie debuted at No.1 at the box office.

=== Critical response ===
Rotten Tomatoes gives the film a score of 27% based on reviews from 15 critics.

== Sequel ==
A sequel to the film, titled House Party 3, was released on January 12, 1994.
