= Tisha Campbell discography =

Tisha Campbell discography discography
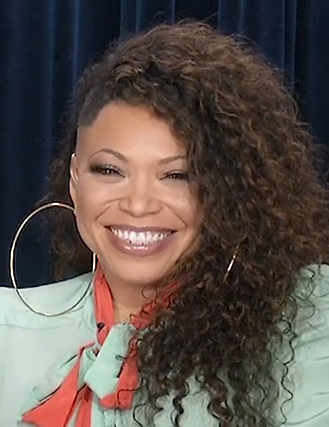
- Studio albums: 1
- Soundtrack albums: 2
- Singles: 8
- Music videos: 8

American actress and singer Tisha Campbell has released one studio album, eight singles and eight music videos.

== Albums ==
List of studio albums, with selected chart positions
Title	Album details	Peak
Title	Album details	US Heat.
Tisha	Release: January 4, 1993; Formats: CD, digital download; Label: Capitol	37
"—" denotes releases that did not chart or were not released in that territory.

== Singles ==
Song	Year	Album
"Be Alone Tonight"	1988	School Daze
"Push"	1993	Tisha
"Love Me Down"	1993	Tisha
"Don't Ask My Neighbor" (with Tichina Arnold)	1997	Sprung
"Steel Here"	2015	Non-album single
"Lazy Bitch (This Ain't Gina)"	2016	Non-album single
"I Don't Wanna Be Alone" (featuring Rich the Kid)	2018	Non-album single
"22 Summers"	2019	Non-album single

=== Featured singles ===
Song	Year	Album
"All Cried Out" (Full Force featuring Tisha Campbell-Martin)	2014	Full Force: With Love From Our Friends
