= House Party (1990 film) =

1990 American comedy film by Reginald Hudlin

- Theatrical release poster
- Directed by: Reginald Hudlin
- Written by: Reginald Hudlin
- Produced by: Warrington Hudlin
- Starring: Kid 'n Play; Full Force; Robin Harris
- Cinematography: Peter Deming
- Edited by: Earl Watson
- Music by: Lenny White; Marcus Miller
- Distributed by: New Line Cinema
- Release dates: January 20, 1990 (Sundance); March 9, 1990 (United States)
- Running time: 100 minutes
- Country: United States
- Language: English
- Budget: $2.5 million
- Box office: $26.4 million

House Party is a 1990 American comedy film directed by Reginald Hudlin. It stars Christopher "Kid" Reid and Christopher "Play" Martin of the hip hop duo Kid 'n Play, B-Fine of Full Force, Martin Lawrence and Robin Harris. It is the first installment in the House Party film series.

== Plot ==
At the beginning of the movie, teenagers dance inside of a house and the noise is so loud that it blows the roof off, sending it careening into the night sky.

In his high-school cafeteria, Peter, also known as "Play," announces he will be throwing a party at his house that night, as his parents are on vacation. His friend Bilal is serving as reluctant DJ. Their friend Christopher "Kid" Robinson Jr. gets involved in an altercation with school bully Stab and his brothers, Pee-Wee and Zilla. At home, Kid tries to convince his father, Pop, to let him attend the party. Pop relents at first, but after getting a letter from Kid's school about the fight with Stab, he changes his mind and grounds Kid for his actions.

Rather than miss the party of the year, Kid sneaks out while Pop is sleeping. However, the door closing behind Kid awakens Pop. On his way to the party, Kid is stopped by the neighborhood police before running into Stab and his brothers. Kid jumps over a fence to escape, landing in the backyard of Roughouse, who is loudly having sex. Kid, along with Stab, Zilla, and Pee-Wee, are shot at by Roughouse, believing them to be voyeurs. Kid ducks into a nearby Alpha Delta Sigma reunion to escape.

Crashing the reunion, Kid has the DJ scratch and mix a few of his old doo wop records so he can liven the party with a rap, but Stab and his posse interrupt. Trying to escape, Kid accidentally knocks down an older man. Kid and the bullies are caught by the police, who detain and humiliate the teenagers before letting them go. Kid's father is stopped and harassed by the police while trying to find him.

The party is in full swing when Kid arrives. During the party, Chill bumps the DJ table, which angers Bilal and other guests, nearly leading to a fight between the two. Kid and Play get into a dance-off with attractive girls Sydney and Sharane, then have a freestyle battle. Stab and his friends attempt to crash the party, but are rejected. They attempt to burn the house down in retaliation, but are arrested this time by the same neighborhood police. The officers take delight in the prospect of beating them up, and later do so.

Although Kid and Sydney have eyes for each other, Sharane decides to flirt with Kid openly, much to Sydney's disgust. Kid offers to walk them home from the party; as he and Sharane are retrieving their coats from upstairs, Pop arrives. Sydney tricks him into thinking Kid has already left, so Pop vows to wait for Kid at home. Play stops the party after his bathroom toilet is broken. When Kid tries to make advances on Sharane before dropping her off, she rebuffs him. Kid walks an upset Sydney back home, and, after arguing, the pair admit their attraction for each other.

Sydney allows Kid into her house. The two are about to have sex when she stops him, wanting to know if she is simply his second choice. Kid admits that Sydney was his first choice all along. However, they do not do anything after realizing that Kid's only condom is too old to be used. When Sydney's parents come home – now revealed as one of the couples at the high-school reunion including the man Kid ran into – Sydney helps Kid sneak out of the house.

Kid manages to get out of another scrape with Stab and his brothers, but they are all arrested and placed in a jail cell. Facing threats of gang rape, Kid begins rapping, distracting the other men in the cell long enough for Play, Sharane, Bilal, and Sydney to arrive and bail him out.

Later, the five friends say their good nights. Sharane agrees to go out with Play, but doesn't allow him to kiss her. Kid and Sydney share a passionate kiss. Afterward, Play and Bilal scold Kid for not having unprotected sex, accusing him of being too much like Pop. They drop him off; Kid sneaks into his house. As he is about to get into bed, he looks up to find Pop holding a belt as he prepares to spank him. As the credits roll, Pop is heard hitting Kid with the belt making various comments before telling him to go to sleep and not to wake up until he tells him to.

In the mid-credits, the roof that was blown off in the opening lands on top of the departing neighborhood police officers.

== Cast ==
- Christopher "Kid" Reid as Christopher "Kid" Robinson Jr., an aspiring rapper
- Christopher "Play" Martin as Peter "Play" Martin, Kid's friend and an aspiring rapper
- "Paul Anthony" George as Stab, the leader of a group of bullies
- Lucien "Bow-Legged Lou" George Jr. as Pee-Wee, a member of Stab's group of bullies
- Brian "B-Fine" George as Zilla, a member of Stab's group of bullies
- Robin Harris as Christopher "Pop" Robinson Sr., the overbearing father of Kid
- Tisha Campbell as Sydney, an attractive girl who is a love interest of Kid
- A.J. Johnson as Sharane, an attractive girl and Sydney's friend
- Martin Lawrence as Bilal, a reluctant friend who becomes the DJ at Play's party
- John Witherspoon as Mr. Strickland
- Barry Diamond as Cop #1, one the police officers that end up dealing the shenanigans caused by Kid 'n Play and Stab, Pee-Wee, and Zilla
- Michael Pniewski as Cop #2
- George Clinton as a DJ
- Kelly Jo Minter as LaDonna
- Gene "Groove" Allen (of Groove B. Chill) as Groove
- Daryl "Chill" Mitchell (of Groove B. Chill) as Chill
- Belal "DJ Belal" Miller (of Groove B. Chill) as Herman
- Lou B. Washington as Otis
- Bebe Drake as Mrs. Strickland
- Clifton Powell as Sharane's Brother
- Verda Bridges as Sharane's Sister
- Desi Arnez Hines II as Peanut
- Norma Donaldson as Mildred
- Shaun Baker as Clint
- Anthony Johnson as E.Z.E.
- Cliff Frazier as Brutus
- Jaime Cardriche as Tattoo
- Ronn Riser as Boy in the Bathroom #1
- Bentley Kyle Evans as Boy in the Bathroom #2
- Reginald Hudlin as Burglar #1 (cameo)
- Warrington Hudlin as Burglar #2 (cameo)

== Production ==
The film was written and directed by Reginald Hudlin, based on his award-winning Harvard University student film. The film was also loosely inspired by Hudlin's upbringing in East St, Illinois.

The lead roles were originally thought to be written for DJ Jazzy Jeff & The Fresh Prince. However, in a 2021 interview with Christopher Martin (Play) with VLADTV, he revealed that Kid N' Play were always meant to be the stars and DJ Jazzy Jeff and Will Smith were considered as an alternative.

== Music ==
=== Soundtrack ===
A soundtrack containing hip hop and R&B music was released on March 9, 1990, by Motown Records. It peaked at 104 on the Billboard 200 and 20 on the Top R&B/Hip-Hop Albums.

== Release ==
The film premiered at the Sundance Film Festival on January 20, 1990, where it won the Cinematography Award for Peter Deming and a Filmmakers Trophy for Reginald Hudlin.

On March 9, 1990, the film opened in 520 theaters and grossed $4,611,024. It became a sleeper hit, making over $26 million on a $2.5 million budget.

== Reception and legacy ==
House Party was met with critical acclaim. On Rotten Tomatoes, the film has a 94% approval rating based on 35 reviews. The website's critical consensus reads, "House Party is a light, entertaining teen comedy with an infectious energy." On Metacritic, the film has a weighted average score of 76 out of 100, based on 15 critics, indicating "generally favorable" reviews. The film has since become a cult classic.

Roger Ebert of the Chicago Sun-Times gave it three out of four stars and commended its "energy and exuberance". He called the film "wall-to-wall with exuberant song and dance" and stated, "the musical is a canvas used by the director, Reginald Hudlin, to show us black teenagers with a freshness and originality that's rare in modern movies".

The film received seven nominations at the 1991 Independent Spirit Awards. Film director Reginald Hudlin was nominated for Best Director, Christopher "Kid" Reid was nominated for Best Male Lead, Tisha Campbell and A.J. Johnson were both nominated for Best Supporting Female, Robin Harris was nominated for Best Supporting Male, and the film's cinematographer Peter Deming was nominated for the Best Cinematography. The film was also nominated for Best First Feature, but lost to Whit Stillman's Metropolitan.

In 2022, the film was selected for preservation in the United States National Film Registry by the Library of Congress as being "culturally, historically, or aesthetically significant". On January 27, 2026, the film was given a home video release on The Criterion Collection.

== Sequels ==
House Party series

- House Party (1983) (short film)
- House Party (1990)
- House Party 2 (1991)
- House Party 3 (1994)
- House Party 4: Down to the Last Minute (2001)
- House Party: Tonight's the Night (2013)
- House Party (2023)

The film was a popular success, and two sequels were made: House Party 2 in 1991, and House Party 3 in 1994. House Party 2 features Lawrence and Campbell reprising their roles from the first film. The two began starring in the TV sitcom Martin the following year. House Party 3 features hip hop/R&B groups TLC and Immature in supporting roles. In 2001, Immature, now going by IMx, starred in a direct-to-video sequel, House Party 4: Down to the Last Minute, which does not feature any of the original cast from the other three films.

A fifth installment and direct follow-up to the third film, titled House Party: Tonight's the Night was filmed in 2012 with Tequan Richmond, Zac Goodman, Tristin Mays, Alex McGregor, Rolonda Watts and Gary Anthony Williams. The film was a direct to DVD release in 2013, and marked the return of Kid 'n Play to the series.

In 2018, it was announced that basketball star LeBron James, along with his SpringHill Entertainment partner Maverick Carter would be producing a new House Party film with Stephen Glover and Jamal Olori writing the screenplay. "This is definitely not a reboot. It’s an entirely new look for a classic movie. Everyone I grew up with loved House Party. To partner with this creative team to bring a new House Party to a new generation is unbelievable. Listen, it's fun, it's an honor when I got the opportunity to produce it, reboot the whole movie, man, I had so much fun as a kid watching that movie," James said. "We’re trying out some ideas for musicians to be cast in and to be a part of the project," Carter said.

Los Angeles filmmaker Calmatic, known for directing "Old Town Road", was tapped to direct in 2019. In April 2021, Jorge Lendeborg Jr. and Tosin Cole were cast in the lead roles. It was SpringHill's last feature film. On July 28, 2021, Jacob Latimore was cast to replace Lendeborg, who dropped out of the film due to his mental well-being. Kid and Play both made cameo appearances in the 2023 film, as did producer James.

== See also ==
- List of hood films
