= A Thin Line Between Love and Hate =

1996 film by Martin Lawrence

- Theatrical release poster
- Directed by: Martin Lawrence
- Screenplay by: Martin Lawrence; Bentley Kyle Evans; Kenny Buford; Kim Bass
- Story by: Martin Lawrence
- Produced by: George Jackson; Doug McHenry
- Starring: Martin Lawrence; Lynn Whitfield; Regina King; Bobby Brown; Daryl Mitchell; Roger E. Mosley; Della Reese
- Cinematography: Francis Kenny
- Edited by: John Carter
- Music by: Roger Troutman
- Production companies: Jackson-McHenry Entertainment; You Go Boy! Productions
- Distributed by: New Line Cinema; Savoy Pictures
- Release date: April 3, 1996
- Running time: 108 minutes
- Country: United States
- Language: English
- Budget: $8 million
- Box office: $34.8 million

A Thin Line Between Love and Hate is a 1996 American comedy thriller film starring and directed by Martin Lawrence in his feature film directorial debut. It tells the story of Darnell Wright (Lawrence), a ladies' man who finds himself stalked by one of his obsessed lovers: Brandi (Lynn Whitfield), an attractive and successful, but unstable older realtor businesswoman.

Along with directing and starring in the film, Lawrence co-wrote the screenplay alongside Kenny Buford, Bentley Kyle Evans and Kim Bass. Released by New Line Cinema and Savoy Pictures on April 3, 1996, the film grossed $34.8 million at the box office against a budget of $8 million. To this day, A Thin Line Between Love and Hate is the only production that Lawrence has ever directed.

== Plot ==
Darnell Wright, a playboy and nightclub manager at Chocolate City, is known for trading VIP access for favors from women, despite harboring lingering feelings for his childhood sweetheart, Mia. Ambitious and self-assured, Darnell aspires to become a co-owner of the club.

When Brandi Web, a wealthy and enigmatic woman, enters the club, Darnell sees her as the ultimate challenge for him as a womanizer and begins to pursue her romantically. Though she initially rejects him, he eventually wins her over. As their relationship deepens, Darnell realizes he is truly in love with Mia and ends things with Brandi as well as all the other women he’s been seeing.

Brandi does not take the rejection well and becomes dangerously obsessed. Her behavior escalates from stalking Darnell to damaging his property, fabricating a domestic abuse incident, and ultimately threatening Mia's life. Despite Darnell breaking off contact and attempting to protect Mia, Brandi's fixation intensifies.

The conflict culminates in a violent confrontation in which Brandi, Darnell, and Mia fall from a window into a pool during a struggle over a firearm. Darnell survives the ordeal and awakens in the hospital surrounded by his loved ones. He resolves to change his ways and build a future with Mia. Brandi is arrested and imprisoned, and Darnell reflects on the experience as a painful but necessary turning point in his life.

== Cast ==
- Martin Lawrence as Darnell Wright
- Lynn Whitfield as Brandi Web
- Regina King as Mia Williams
- Bobby Brown as "Tee"
- Daryl M. Mitchell as Earl
- Roger E. Mosley as Smitty
- Della Reese as Mama Wright
- Simbi Khali as Adrienne
- Tangie Ambrose as Nikki
- Wendy Robinson as Gwen
- Malinda Williams as Erica Wright
- Stacii Jae Johnson as "Peaches"
- Miguel A. Núñez Jr. as Reggie
- Faizon Love as Manny
- Michael Bell as Marvis
- Michael Taliferro as Club Security
- Tiny Lister as Tyrone
- Tracy Morgan as Sean, The Bartender

== Style ==
The plot of A Thin Line Between Love and Hate was influenced by Boomerang and Fatal Attraction. The opening sequence, depicting Darnell lying unconscious and fully clothed face down in a swimming pool while narrating the events that led him to there, was influenced by Billy Wilder's 1950 film Sunset Boulevard. The film has been classified as a comedy thriller.

== Reception ==
On its opening weekend A Thin Line Between Love and Hate grossed $9 million, ranking at number three at the box office behind Primal Fear and The Birdcage. By the end of its run, the film grossed $34,873,513 at the box office against a budget of $8 million.

The critical reception of the film was mostly negative. On Rotten Tomatoes the film has a 15% rating based on 26 reviews.

== Soundtrack ==
Year	Album	Peak chart positions	Certifications
Year	Album	U.S.	Certifications
1996	A Thin Line Between Love and Hate: Released: January 30, 1996; Label: Warner Bros.	22	US: Gold
