= Charles Kidd =

Charles Kidd may refer to:

- Chip Kidd (born 1964), American graphic designer
- Charles Kidd II (born 1987) or Calmatic, American music video director
