= House Party: Tonight's the Night =

2013 film

- Official DVD cover
- Directed by: Darin Scott
- Written by: Don D. Scott
- Based on: Characters by Reginald Hudlin
- Produced by: Doug McHenry
- Starring: Tequan Richmond; Zac Goodspeed; Rolonda Watts; Tristin Mays; Gary Anthony Williams; Kid 'n Play
- Cinematography: Thomas L. Callaway
- Edited by: Tony Lombardo
- Music by: Michael Corcoran; Eric Goldman
- Production companies: Film Afrika Worldwide; Market Street Productions (II); Elephant Walk McHenry Entertainment
- Distributed by: Warner Bros. Pictures (Note: Released under the Warner Premiere label.)
- Release date: July 23, 2013
- Running time: 89 minutes
- Country: United States
- Language: English

House Party: Tonight's the Night is a 2013 American direct-to-video comedy film. It is the fifth installment of the House Party franchise, and a direct continuation of the first three films, ignoring the events of House Party 4: Down to the Last Minute (2001). It stars Tequan Richmond and Zac Goodspeed as two high school seniors who decide to throw a party while the parents are out of town. They are also seeking to get into the music industry. Rappers Kid 'n Play, who were the original stars of the first three films, make a special appearance in the film. The film is directed by Darin Scott.

== Plot ==
Chris and his best friend Dylan are high school seniors. After they engage in a rap battle at school, Chris sees Autumn Rose, the girl he's had a crush on since 2nd grade, get into an argument with her boyfriend Quentin. Autumn then consoles fellow student Precocious, a plus-sized girl Quentin insulted during his argument with Autumn. Chris approaches Autumn and gives her a compliment. When Chris gets home, his father gives him a new red 1985 Chevrolet Camaro as a gift for him to go to college. His parents received news over the phone that a relative passed away. So they leave Chris alone in the house for a few days to attend the funeral. Dylan aspires to get into the music industry, but Chris plans to go to college instead. Dylan and Chris drive around, and Dylan receives a call from a record executive. Dylan suggests Chris to hold a party for the kids at his house. Dylan spreads the news via social media that the party will happen at Chris's house; much to Chris's charging. Across the street from Chris is his neighbor Victoria, a middle aged woman who plans to attend the party and have sex with him.

The party is in progress, and gets out of control as more kids attends. Dylan receives another call from the record label, and informs Chris that the record executive will attend their party; though neither of them have any idea what the person looks like. Autumn arrives with her friend Morgan. While Morgan socializes with Dylan, Autumn share drinks and conversations with Chris right before Quentin intervenes and takes Autumn away. Victoria arrives at the party with her friend Tracey, and tries to seduce Chris. A man in a suit also arrives and states he is here on business. Chris goes to the closet to find wire cutters when the DJ's turntable shorts out. But Victoria corners him, and attempts to have sex with Chris as Autumn catches them together. Chris tries to explain to Autumn that he wasn't trying anything with Victoria. Chris then returns downstairs to rap with Dylan, and to impress the man in the suit.

During the party, Precocious meets a socially awkward boy named Jerry. They have sex in the bathroom on the toilet, and it collapses through the floor onto the living room where the party is. Chris and Dylan finally speaks with the man in the suit about their opportunity to get into the music industry, under the belief that he was the record executive. However, the man reveals that he is actually Gary, the limo driver who drove some of the kids to the party.

Due to the damages in the living room, the party is moved to the backyard. Despite being responsible for the damages they caused, Precocious and Jerry were applauded by their peers as the reappear. Autumn sees Quentin talking to another girl, and Chris takes her to dance. Victoria then makes another sexual advance on Chris in front of the kids, but is rejected once more. Autumn gives Quentin back the chain he gave her earlier, and breaks up with him. But Quentin grabs her arm aggressively, and Chris steps in. Chris and Quentin gets into a brief altercation, and Quentin knocks out Chris with an uppercut after Chris punches him. The other kids threw drinks at Quentin as he leaves the party. Dylan and Autumn help Chris up after the fight. However, Chris and Dylan have an argument over the party and their future plans. Autumn stays and agrees to help Chris clean up. Dylan and Morgan returns, but Dylan sold his car for the cleaning crew he hired to clean and repair the damages in the house. Chris and Dylan reconcile afterwards. And Chris and Autumn make out in his new car.

The following morning, Chris's parents return home. Chris and Autumn are caught sleeping in the car together by Chris's father. Dylan is then approached by Kennison Scott, the real record executive. He saw a video of his and Chris's performance on the internet, and was impressed. Chris's mother watches the same video on her computer, and saw the damages that was done in the house during the party. Kennison offers Chris and Dylan a development contract, and a trip to New York City to meet the owners of the record label they'll be signed to. The next day, Chris and Dylan pick up Autumn and Morgan in the Camero, and they drive off.

In the mid-credit scene, Chris and Dylan arrive at the record label and they meet Kid 'n Play, the owners of the label. Kid 'n Play stated they watched Chris and Dylan in their video from the party doing their famous dance moves, and advised Chris and Dylan to never do that again.

== Cast ==
- Tequan Richmond as Chris Johnson
- Zac Goodspeed as Dylan
- Tristin Mays as Autumn Rose
- Gary Anthony Williams as Melvin Johnson
- Jacqui Achilleas as Mimi Johnson
- Rolonda Watts as Victoria
- Julie Hartley as Tracey
- Alex McGregor as Morgan
- Keith Powers as Quentin
- Kid and Play as Themselves

== Production ==
On August 30, 2012, Tambay A. Obenson, of Indiewire, reported that the Hudlin Brothers and Kid N' Play would not be in the film. The latter report proved to be false as Kid N' Play do appear in the film. On August 31, 2012, Stan Castle, of Atlanta Black Star, reported that Darin Scott, Don D. Scott, and Doug McHenry would direct, write, and produce the film respectively. Filming began on September 24, 2012. The movie was filmed in South Africa.

== Music ==
1. Dangerous – Written by Melody Verdugo, Colton Fisher, & Jason Rabinowitz – Performed by Chanel Leon
2. Night Will Never End – Written by Lauren Vogel and Eric Goldman – Performed by Lauryn Vyce

== Release ==
=== Home media ===
On August 30, 2012, Warner Bros. announced that they would make a fifth film in the series, and it would be released direct-to-video by Warner Bros.' Warner Premiere. The film was released on DVD July 23, 2013.

== Reception ==
=== Critical response ===
Nathaniel Stevens, of Digital Chumps, writes: "This movie isn't bad because of the content of the film. The first film by the same name was basically the same premise and was a huge hit back in 1990 (or at least it did very well for the type of budget it was shot on). Having said that, it's obvious that the formula works and has been done over and over again through many different movies. You lay down the main premise that there is going to be a huge party then you sprinkle it with plot points. Again, it's been done and has succeeded several times over. The main issue with House Party: Tonight's the Night is that all the plot points in the film are either shallow in terms of setup, or they just pop them in as time fillers. There's nothing particularly coherent about this film that screams 'solid'."

== Reboot ==
SpringHill Entertainment developed House Party a sixth House Party film that will serve as a reboot to the series, as opposed to another sequel. Originally set for a VOD release from HBO Max, it was further delayed due to Warner Bros. Discovery's corporate resturcturing, thus delaying it for a theatrical release on December 9, 2022, before delaying it to a Martin Luther King Jr. release on January 13, 2023. As with the previous films, it received negative reviews.
