= Michael Colyar =

American actor (born 1957)

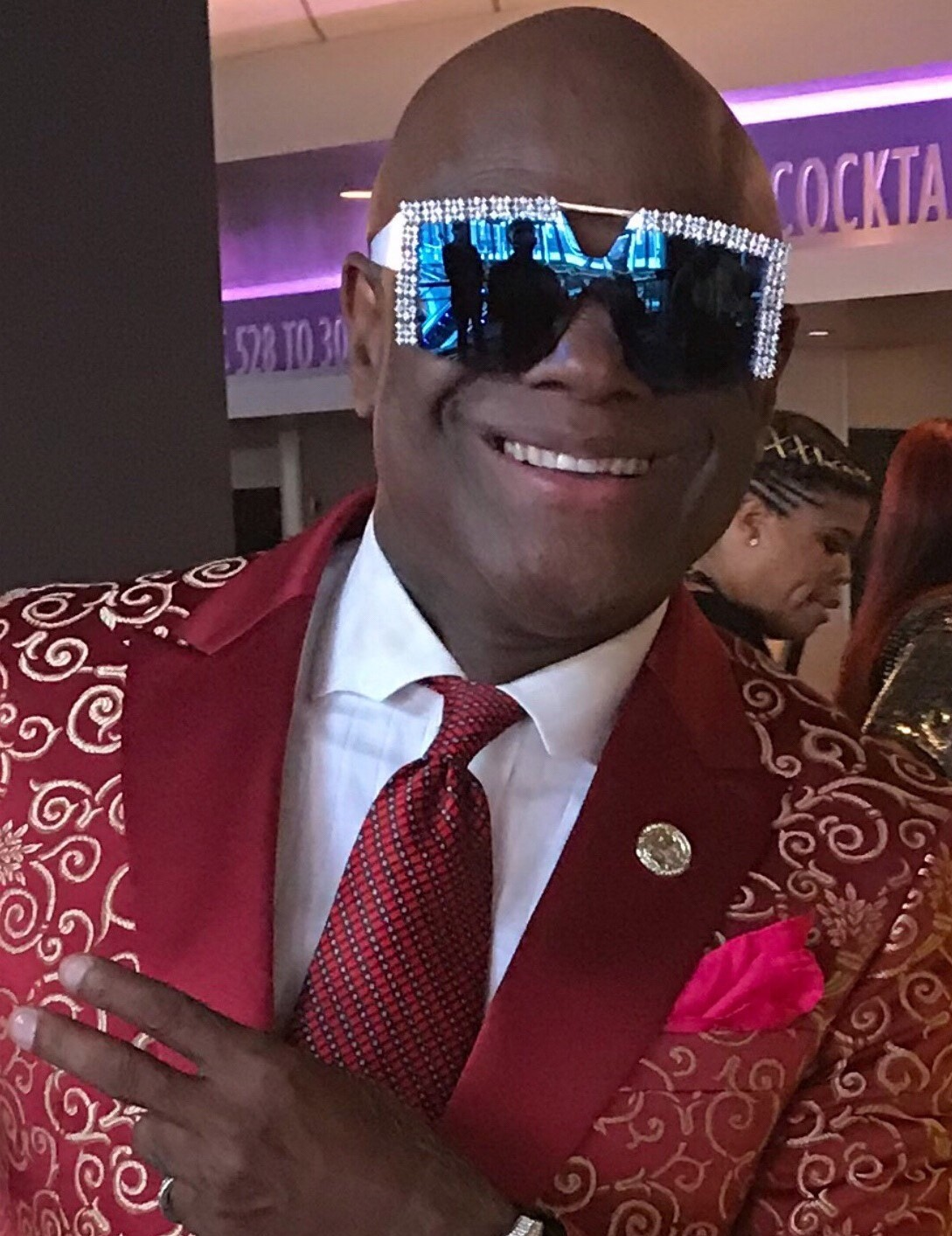
- Colyar in 2018.
- Born: Michael K. Colyar; February 9, 1957 (age 69); Chicago, Illinois, U.S.
- Notable work: House Party 3; Martin

Comedy career
- Years active: 1987–present
- Medium: Stand-up; film; television; radio
- Genres: Conscious comedy; Observational comedy; black humor; surreal humor; satire; self-deprecation
- Subjects: African-American culture; American politics; current events; everyday life; human sexuality; marriage; parenting; pop culture; race relations; racism; self-deprecation; police; recovery
- Website: therealmichaelcolyar.com

Michael K. Colyar (born February 9, 1957) is an American actor, comedian, entertainer, voiceover artist, television/radio personality, and author.

== Early life and education ==
Born in Chicago, Illinois, Colyar was raised in the Robert Taylor Homes public housing project and later relocated to the Morgan Park area. Colyar attended Morgan Park High School, graduating in 1975. Shortly after high school, Colyar attended Olive-Harvey junior college and later Chicago State University.

== Other information ==
Colyar is the author of A Funny Thing Happened on the Way to The White House, I Knocked on the Door and a Brother Answered, which was published in August 2012. Colyar began embarking on his 100 City tour of "Michael Colyar's Momma" in June 2018. He starred in the 2022 film You Married Dat alongside LisaRaye, Juhahn Jones, Apryl Jones, and Audra Kinkead.

== Filmography ==
=== Film ===
Year	Title	Role	Notes
1987	Hollywood Shuffle	Body Guard #3	
1988	Johnny Be Good	Recruiter Mike	
1988	Necessity	Photographer	TV movie
1990	Downtown	Pusher	
1990	Zapped Again!	Sheldon	Video
1990	The Closer	Hustler	
1993	Hot Shots! Part Deux	Williams	
1993	What's Love Got to Do with It	Apollo Announcer	
1993	Poetic Justice	Panhandler	
1994	House Party 3	Showboat	
1994	Jugular Wine: A Vampire Odyssey	Bouncer	
1996	Alien Avengers	Minister	TV movie
1998	High Freakquency	Warm Daddy	
1999	A Luv Tale	George Winston	
1999	Rising to the Top	Charlie, Jailer #1	
2003	The Beat	Chi-Barnes	
2003	Family Reunion: The Movie	Himself	Video
2003	The Search for the Next Black Leader	Rufus	Short
2004	Mean Jadine	Ron	Short
2004	Lexie	Andre	Video
2004	Out on Parole	Ward	Video
2004	Roscoe's House of Chicken n Waffles	Man Getting Out of Car	Video
2005	A Get2Gether	Dad	
2005	Clean Up Men	Uncle Scott	
2006	Who Made the Potatoe Salad?	Old Man #1 in Park	
2007	Norbit	Morris the Barber	
2008	The Longshots	Ennis	
2008	I'm Every Woman	-	Short
2010	Malice N Wonderland	Cop #2	Video
2010	Church	Brother Johnson	
2012	C'Mon Man	Himself	
2013	A Christmas Wedding	Grady	
2013	Mutumbo the Lost Prince	Rodney	
2014	Patterns of Attraction	Uncle Benny	
2014	Bitter Inheritance	Jim	Short
2015	Diamond Ruff	Everette Wilson	
2018	It's a Date	Everett Reese	
2020	Ray Jr's Rent Due	Landlord Pete	
2020	Holiday Heartbreak	Mike McCoy	TV movie
2022	You Married Dat	Mona's Dad	
2022	The Shutdown	Pops	
2023	Uncle Rufus' Last Request	Uncle Rufus	
2023	Outlaw Johnny Black	Barker	
2023	So Fly Christmas	Myron	TV movie
2024	Too Many Christmases	Myron	

=== Television ===
Year	Title	Role	Notes
1989	Dragnet	R.C. Jones	Episode: "The Triple Cross"
1989	227	Rudolph	Episode: "Guess Who's Not Coming to Christmas?"
1989-94	An Evening at the Improv	Himself	Guest Cast: Season 4 & 6 & 9 & 15
1990	Star Search	Himself	Contestant: Season 8
1990	Equal Justice	Eddie Washington	Episode: "A Sucker's Bet"
1991	One Night Stand	Himself	Episode: "Michael Colyar"
1992	It's Showtime at the Apollo	Himself	Episode: "Jackée Harry/Rythm Syndicate/David Peaston/Mark Curry"
1992-95	Def Comedy Jam	Himself	Recurring Guest
1995	The John Larroquette Show	Lou Friedman	Episode: "The Defiant One"
1995	Fudge	Frank Fargo	Episode: "The Art of Friendship"
1996	Homeboys in Outer Space	Milky Ray	Recurring Cast
1995-97	Martin	Mr. Whitaker	Guest: Season 4, Recurring Cast: Season 5
1998	The Hughleys	Booker T.	Episode: "The Thanksgiving Episode"
1999	In the House	Dr. Doobie	Episode: "Cornbread, Marion and Me" & "Guest Dad"
2002	The Parkers	Mr. Thomas	Episode: "High Heels and Videotapes"
2003	It's Showtime at the Apollo	Himself	Episode: "Solange/Talib Kweli/Michael Colyar"
2005	Barbershop	Leonard	Recurring Cast
2006	The Bernie Mac Show	Man	Episode: "Spinning Wheels"
2007	Nick Cannon Presents: Short Circuitz	Temp Preacher	Episode: "Episode #1.8"
2007	Everybody Hates Chris	Judge #2	Episode: "Everybody Hates Driving"
2011	The Cleveland Show	Buff Man (voice)	Episode: "Sex and the Biddy"
2012	Life After	Himself	Episode: "Ernest Lee Thomas"
2012	ComicView	Himself	Episode: "Kevin Hart/Timmy Hall/Michael Colyar"
2012	Comedy.tv	Himself	Episode: "Episode #1.27"
2014	Comics Unleashed	Himself	Recurring Guest
2014	Off the Chain	Himself	Episode: "Episode #3.2"
2014	Black Dynamite	Sweet Butter (voice)	Episode: "Roots: The White Album"
2015	Black-ish	Reverend Hubbard	Episode: "Churched"
2015-16	Mi Casa Mi Casa	Stanley	Main Cast
2016	Family Time	Willy	Episode: "Thanks for Giving"
2017	BSU: Black Student Union	Herman	Episode: "The Party"
2017-21	The Rich and the Ruthless	Willie Turner	Main Cast
2018	Rel	Regular Steve	Episode: "Re-Enter the Dragons"
2022	Phat Tuesdays: The Era Of Hip Hop Comedy	Himself	Recurring Guest
2023	The Ms. Pat Show	Bernard	Episode: "Father Christmas"
2023	Double Cross	Jerry	Episode: "Family Over Everything"
2024	Mind Your Business	Obadiah	Episode: "History Repeats Itself"

=== Video Games ===
Year	Title	Role	Notes
2009	The Princess and the Frog	Buford (voice)	
