= Jaden Lucas Miller =

American actor

- Born: June 30, 2005 (age 21); Raleigh, North Carolina, U.S.
- Education: North Carolina A&T State University
- Occupation: Actor

Jaden Lucas Miller (born June 30, 2005) is an American actor from Raleigh, North Carolina. He is recognized playing Tyrell Richardson on the CBS soap opera Beyond the Gates and for his role as Laz on the BET comedy drama Divorced Sistas. He also appeared as Michael Jr. in the 2024 parody film Not Another Church Movie, and has had guest roles on true crime series such as Murder Decoded and Homicide Hunter. In 2026, Miller appeared in Paper Made as Tony. Directed by Ryan Watson and filmed in Tampa, Florida. The film premiered at the AMC Westhore 14 in Tampa on August 28th, 2026.

== Early life and education ==
Miller graduated from Cardinal Gibbons High School in 2024 and enrolled at North Carolina A&T State University the same year.

== Filmography ==
=== Film ===
Year	Title	Role	Notes
2017	The Boy and Boris	The Boy	Short film
2024	Not Another Church Movie	Michael Jr.	
2025	Strands	Kenny	Short film
2026	Paper Made	Tony	

=== Television ===
Year	Title	Role	Notes
2018	Homicide Hunter	Tim's little brother	Episode: "The Setup"
2019	Murder Decoded	Young Marquise	Episode: "Prowling Wolf"
2025	Divorced Sistas	Laz	
2025	Beyond the Gates	Tyrell Richardson	Recurring role Reasonable Doubt 2025 Teen Ozzie Episode 309.
