= The Cookout =

2004 film by Lance Rivera

- Theatrical release poster
- Directed by: Lance Rivera
- Screenplay by: Ramsey Gbelawoe; Jeffrey Brian Holmes
- Story by: Queen Latifah; Shakim Compere; Mikey Martin
- Produced by: Shakim Compere; Queen Latifah
- Starring: Ja Rule; Tim Meadows; Jenifer Lewis; Storm P. Meagan Good; Jonathan Silverman; Farrah Fawcett; Frankie Faison; Eve; Danny Glover; Queen Latifah
- Cinematography: Tom Houghton
- Edited by: Patricia Bowers; Jeff McEvoy
- Music by: Camara Kambon
- Production companies: Lions Gate Films; Flavor Unit Entertainment
- Distributed by: Lions Gate Films
- Release date: September 3, 2004
- Running time: 85 minutes
- Country: United States
- Language: English
- Budget: $16 million
- Box office: $12 million

The Cookout is a 2004 American comedy film directed by Lance Rivera, written by Ramsay Gbelawoe & Jeffrey Brian Holmes, and story by Queen Latifah, Shakim Compere, and Mikey Martin. The film introduces Quran Pender (credited as "Storm P") as Todd Anderson and stars Ja Rule, Tim Meadows, Jenifer Lewis, Meagan Good, Jonathan Silverman, Farrah Fawcett, Frankie Faison, Eve, Danny Glover, and a special appearance by Latifah. It tells the story of a basketball player who has joined the New Jersey Nets which his parents celebrate with a family cookout at his new home while a former classmate comes up with a devious plot.

This was the last film for both Carl Wright and Farrah Fawcett before their respective deaths in 2007 and 2009. The film was met with negative reviews.

In 2011, there was a sequel called The Cookout 2.

== Plot ==
Todd Andersen (Quran Pender) has just signed a 5-year/$30 million contract with his hometown basketball team the New Jersey Nets. He purchases many new luxuries for himself and his family including a new house in a well-established, high-class neighborhood called Garden Ridges Estates for him and his gold-digging girlfriend Brittany (Meagan Good).

Keeping with family tradition, Todd and his parents Em and JoJo (Jenifer Lewis and Frankie Faison) decide to host a regular family cookout in his new place. He does not plan for it to clash with an important business meeting for an endorsement deal which his sports agent Wes (Jonathan Silverman) arranges with Stone Mountain Phones representative Miss Peters (Marci Reed).

The meeting is scheduled to take place in the morning while the guests are to arrive in the afternoon. One by one, members of Todd's eccentric family like stoner cousins Willie and Nelson (Jerod Mixon and Jamal Mixon), country cousins Jerome and Jasper (Shawn Andrew and Godfrey), wannabe lawyer Uncle Leroy (Tim Meadows), Todd's grandfather (Carl Wright), cousin Little Dee (Denee Busby) and her kids, and Em's sister Nettie (Rita Owens) alongside her husband Frank (Reg E. Cathey) and pre-med intellectual son Jamal (Kevin Phillps) begin to arrive before the afternoon disrupting his business interview. As Em keeps Brittany busy with a ham-related errand, neighbors Judge Crowley (Danny Glover) and his wife Eileen (Farrah Fawcett) are drawn to the cookout.

Meanwhile, local hood Bling Bling (Ja Rule) is jealous that his former classmate Todd has made it with his basketball contract, especially after being insulted and embarrassed in front of the neighborhood when Todd gave him a nod earlier when out with Jamal. He and his friend Wheezer (Ruperto Vanderpool) plan to get many pairs of sneakers signed by the upcoming star to sell on eBay and become rich. Whilst on their way to Todd's new house, they crash their car due to Wheezer, hitch a ride with a manure salesman (Vincent Pastore), and then try to steal a new Mercedes from a market parking lot, not realizing the car belongs to Brittany. After finding out, they hold her at gunpoint and force her to drive them to Todd's house.

As time goes on, Todd starts to become mainly concerned about his image as his family's antics begin making a poor impression on his neighbors, especially after Garden Ridges' security guard Mildred Smith (Queen Latifah) visits with a list of both their complaints and rules violations committed by his family. Eventually, Todd snaps and yells at everyone to leave.

Soon after, Todd's childhood friend Becky (Eve) arrives. Nettie talks to Em about their rivalry and Jamal not having plans to do basketball like Todd. Em encourages Nettie to be proud of Jamal's accomplishments in life no matter what they are. After a talk with Becky, Todd apologizes to his mother for losing his temper. She forgives him after settling her differences with Nettie and the departure of the non-relatives.

When Bling Bling and Wheezer invade the cookout to get Todd's autograph on the sneakers, the ensuing chaos makes Todd realize how much he needs his family. Bling Bling and Wheezer are defeated by Mildred, Jerome, and Jasper and are arrested by the police.

Todd then breaks up with Brittany after realizing her gold-digging ways and inability to connect with him and his family and starts dating Becky as DJ Enuff performs at the party. Todd is then shocked when Miss Peters, impressed by his family's unconditional love for him and each other, accepts him for the sponsorship deal as she makes out with Wes.

A postscript reveals that Todd scored 26 points in his debut in the New Jersey Nets and he and his fiancé Becky use the car bed he originally slept in during his childhood. Jamal completed med school and broke up with Brittany three times. Little Dee finally got a father figure for her kids and moved in next to Todd. Leroy failed his bar exam for the 16th time and his golf ball conspiracy book White Balls & White Devils was a New Jersey bestseller. Mildred left Garden Ridges and became a cop who gained a record of different tickets written out with the Andersons throwing a cookout in her honor.

== Cast ==
- Quran "Storm P" Pender as Todd Andersen, a basketball player who joins the New Jersey Nets.
  - Otis Best as Young Todd
- Ja Rule as Percival "Bling Bling" Ashmokeem, a rival of Todd who used to pick on him when he was a child. When his last name is mispronounced as "Assmackey", Bling Bling corrects it by stating that it's a West African pronunciation.
  - Ali Wright as Young Bling Bling
- Tim Meadows as Leroy, the uncle of Todd and a wannabe lawyer who has failed his bar exam 15 times.
- Jenifer Lewis as Emma "Lady Em" Andersen, the mother of Todd.
- Meagan Good as Brittany, the gold-digging girlfriend of Todd who Lady Em disapproves of.
- Jonathan Silverman as Wes Riley, Todd's sports agent.
- Farrah Fawcett as Eileen Crowley, an inhabitant of Garden Ridges Estates and the neighbor of Todd.
- Frankie Faison as JoJo Andersen, the father of Todd.
- Eve as Becky Cruz, a childhood friend of Todd.
  - Channelle Nazaire as Young Becky
- Danny Glover as Halstead Crowley, a judge who is the husband of Mrs. Crowley.
- Queen Latifah as Mildred Smith, a security guard at Garden Ridges Estates. Her name wasn't revealed until the postscript.
- Ruperto Vanderpool as Wheezer, the clumsy friend of Bling Bling who used to pick on Todd when he was a child.
  - Rodney Henry as Young Wheezer
- Vincent Pastore as Poo Salesman, a man who collects and sells horse manure.
- Roberto Roman as Danny
- Carl Wright as Grandpa, the unnamed grandfather of Todd who is often seen with a wooden baseball bat.
- Reg E. Cathey as Frank Washington, the maternal uncle of Todd.
- Rita Owens as Nettie Washington, the maternal aunt of Todd and sister of Lady Em.
- Kevin Phillips as Jamal Washington, the son of Frank and Nettie and maternal cousin of Todd who wants to become a doctor instead of a basketball player like Nettie wanted.
- Gerry Bamman as Jeeves, a butler who Todd gets for his parents.
- Marci Reed as Miss Peters, the representative of Stone Mountain Phones.
- Denee Busby as Little Dee, the cousin of Todd who is looking for a father figure for her kids and also disapproves of Brittany.
- Divine Compere as D.J., the daughter of Little Dee.
- Hasani Houston as Sonny Ray, the son of Little Dee through a man named Marquis Fontaineau.
- Julian Douglas and Mehki Clayton-Smith as Little Ray, the two-year-old son of Little Dee.
- Jerod Mixon as Willie, the pot-smoking cousin of Todd.
- Jamal Mixon as Nelson, the pot-smoking brother of Willie and the cousin of Todd.
- Thomas Jane O'Leary as A.C. Charles, a Sports Time reporter who interviews Todd, Lady Em, and JoJo.
- Wendy Williams as Piers Gabriel, a Sports Time reporter who interviews Todd, Lady Em, and JoJo.
- Shawn Andrew as Jerome, the country cousin of Todd.
- Godfrey as Jasper, the country cousin of Todd.
- Lance Spellerberg as Sven, a master chef from Prague who is hired by Brittany to cook brunch for Miss Peters.
- Jesse May as Olivier, the assistant of Sven.
- Peggy Cosgrove as Mrs. Atwater
- Walter Simpson III as A.J.
- Wilhelm Lewis as Wayne
- Antonio Walker as Young Thug
- Deep Katdare as a clerk who Bling Bling and Wheezy rob.
- William Stone Mahoney as Commissioner
- Sandra Mills Scott as Nurse
- Roxy Noffz as Cookie Girl, a girl scout who is denied entry by the security guard who does buy the cookies from her.
- Marc Plastrik as the unnamed chief of police who compliments Mildred's heroic actions.
- Alex Avant as an unnamed police officer who assists in the arrest of Bling Bling and Wheezy.
- DJ Enuff as himself, he performs at the cookout.
- Marv Albert as himself, he commentates on the draft picks that Todd is a part of.
- Elton Brand as himself
- Mark Cuban as himself, he appears during the draft picks that Todd is a part of.
- Baron Davis as himself, he appears during the draft picks that Todd is a part of.

== Box office ==
The film opened on 1,303 screens, and opened at #8 in the box office with a gross of $5.1 million. After seven weeks, it ended with a domestic gross of $11.8 million and made $195,051 from foreign countries, for a worldwide total of $12 million against a budget of $16 million, becoming a box-office bomb.

== Reception ==
On the review aggregator website Rotten Tomatoes, 5% of 41 critics' reviews are positive. The website's consensus reads: "Good-natured but prepared with an absence of craft, The Cookout is an unappetizing collection of warmed-over jokes."Metacritic, which uses a weighted average, assigned the film a score of 15 out of 100, based on 14 critics, indicating "overwhelming dislike".

== Sequel ==
On September 3, 2011, a sequel, The Cookout 2 premiered on BET. Quran Pender, Ja Rule, Frankie Faison, Rita Owens, and Denee Busby were the only cast members to reprise their roles. Despite the title, the plot itself is not about a cookout at all with the cookout occurring earlier in the film. Talk show host Wendy Williams had a brief cameo as reporter Piers Gabriel in the original. In the sequel, she makes a special guest appearance as herself hearing about Todd's experiences in the film on her talk show. Charlie Murphy co-stars in the film as Coach Ashmokeem, the brother of Bling Bling (Rule). The rest of the principal cast consists of Freez Luv, Faizon Love, Big Boi, Jalen Rose, Michael K. Williams, Fat Joe, Jay Pharoah, Vivica A. Fox, and Mike Tyson.

== See also ==
- List of basketball films
