= House party =

Party at the house of the host

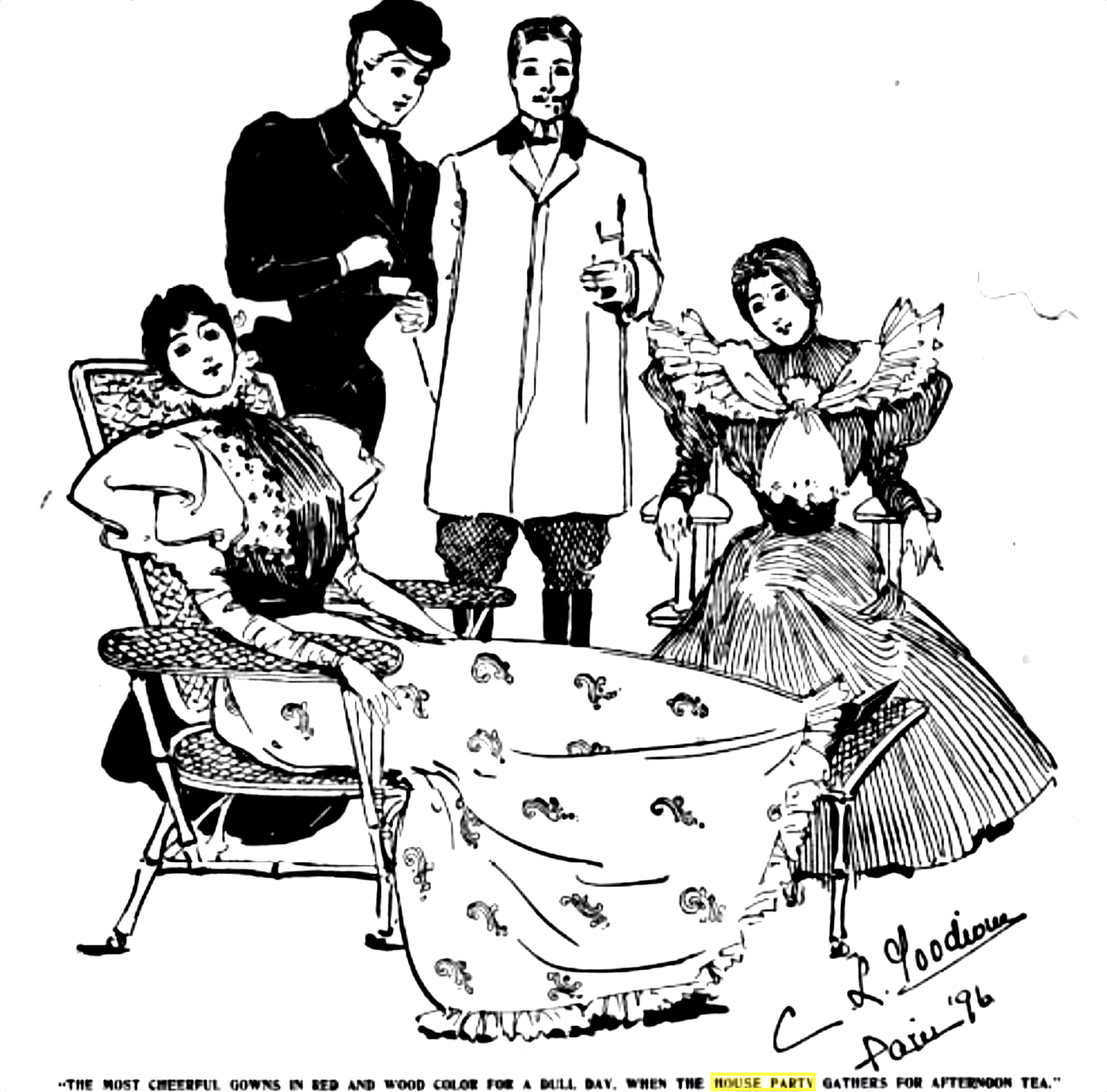
Sketch from the St. Louis Daily Globe-Democrat, September 27, 1896, accompanying an article by Nina Goodwin, datelined Paris, France, September 15, beginning “One hears now, more than anything else, the subject of house parties being discussed.” The caption reads: “The most cheerful gowns in red and wood color for a dull day, when the house party gathers for afternoon tea.” Women are relaxing in garden furniture.

Newspaper layout dealing with house parties, with sketches by Marguerite Martyn of the St. Louis Post-Dispatch and photographs of society women, 1909. The man in the center is carrying golf clubs, and there is a hammock in the lower drawing.

A house party in Denver, Colorado, February 2009

A house party is a type of party held at the home of the party's host.

In the United Kingdom, house parties may be referred to as a 'Skins' party, referring to a well-known TV show focusing on the lives of teenagers who often participate in and host open house parties.

== Organization ==
It is recommended to bring some food and drinks to a house party or ask the host what might be needed.

=== Uninvited guests ===
Broad notice of a party – sometimes unintentionally – can result in large numbers of people attending who do not know the host personally and may be disruptive.

A person who attends a house party without an invitation is typically referred to as a "gatecrasher." Gatecrashing involves entering or participating in an event without authorization, often by blending in with invited guests or exploiting lapses in security. While some gatecrashers may be tolerated or even welcomed by hosts, they are generally viewed negatively due to concerns about safety, capacity, and the potential for disruptive behavior.

== In popular culture ==
House parties have become a prominent feature in popular films, particularly movies aimed at teenagers. The 1968 film The Party is one of the first to properly provide a scene of a house party. However, the most popular film later on is House Party, featuring the hip-hop duo Kid 'n Play.

== See also ==
- Cocktail party
- House Party, Inc.
- House Party (radio and TV show)
- Salon (gathering)
- Šokačko sijelo, minority festival

== Bibliography ==
For Sijelo:

- Milenko S. Filipović (1982). Among the people, native Yugoslav ethnography: selected writing of Milenko S. Filipović. Michigan Slavic Publications, Dept. of Slavic Languages and Literatures. p. 97. ISBN 9780930042479.
- Norman M. Naimark; Holly Case (2003). Yugoslavia and Its Historians: Understanding the Balkan Wars of the 1990s. Stanford University Press. ISBN 978-0-8047-4594-9.
