= Jason's Lyric =

1994 film directed by Doug McHenry

- Theatrical release poster
- Directed by: Doug McHenry
- Written by: Bobby Smith Jr.
- Produced by: Doug McHenry; George Jackson; Marilla Lane Ross
- Starring: Allen Payne; Jada Pinkett; Bokeem Woodbine; Anthony 'Treach' Criss; Eddie Griffin; Forest Whitaker
- Cinematography: Francis Kenny
- Edited by: Andrew Mondshein
- Music by: AR
- Production companies: PolyGram Filmed Entertainment; Propaganda Films; Jackson/McHenry Company
- Distributed by: Gramercy Pictures
- Release date: September 28, 1994
- Running time: 120 minutes
- Country: United States
- Language: English
- Budget: $7 million
- Box office: $20,851,521

Jason's Lyric is a 1994 American romantic psychological drama film, written by Bobby Smith Jr., directed by Doug McHenry, who co-produced the film with George Jackson and Marilla Lane Ross, and starring Allen Payne, Jada Pinkett, Bokeem Woodbine, Treach, Eddie Griffin, Lahmard Tate, Lisa Nicole Carson, and Forest Whitaker. Set in Third Ward, Houston, Texas, the story is about two mentally scarred brothers who choose different paths in dealing with their tragic childhood. When the older brother finds love, he starts facing tough choices: continue to feel family responsibility for his younger brother, or follow his heart to be with his girlfriend.

== Plot ==
As children, brothers Jason and Joshua Alexander witnessed the fatal shooting of their abusive father, Mad Dog, one night after he came home drunk and attacked their mother. Said tragedy leaves deep scars and prompts them to choose different paths in their future. Jason becomes a responsible young man who works as an assistant manager and sales clerk in a Houston electronic shop and lives with his hard-working mom, Gloria. Joshua has just been released from prison. Previously traumatized by his late father, he has become a volatile, disturbed ex-con. Jason and Gloria try their best to make Joshua repent and change his ways, but he has difficulties staying out of trouble with both law and authority.

One day in the middle of Jason's working hour, a waitress named Lyric comes to buy a television. Falling instantly in love with her, Jason begins to pursue her. At first, Lyric rejects Jason's attempts to get closer to her due to her cynicism of men, but his persistence, sincerity, kindness, and humor eventually win her over. They grow closer and end up making love in the woods that magically turn into a flower field. Despite his improved and meaningful life since dating Lyric, Jason is still haunted by multiple episodic nightmares of his childhood.

Meanwhile, Lyric's criminal older brother, Alonzo, plans to rob a bank with his gang and Joshua joins in. Lyric overhears their conversation and tells Jason. She warns Jason not to cross her brother, and he promises her he will only talk to Joshua and then offers her a way for them to escape town together. Lyric delightfully accepts and they agree to meet at the bayou. The following day, the robbery goes wrong as Joshua arrives late. Even worse, he escalates the situation by independently assaulting one of the bank customers, although he escapes with the gang before the police arrive. As punishment for botching the plan, Joshua is brutally tortured by Alonzo and his gang. Back at home, as Jason informs his mom about his and Lyric's plan to move away together, Joshua returns severely wounded. Enraged, Jason breaks his promise to Lyric by confronting Alonzo, and a vicious fight in a public restroom ensues.

Jason reluctantly calls off his and Lyric's plan, reasoning that Joshua will always need him. When Lyric furiously questions Jason about the nightmares that tie him to keep saving his ungrateful brother, Jason eventually opens up about the childhood incident that left him a lifetime of haunting guilt: After a young Joshua pointed his mother's gun at a drunken Mad Dog to stop him, Jason wrestled it away from him, inadvertently killing Mad Dog himself. Having finally understood his lifelong trauma, Lyric comforts Jason. Nevertheless, she advises him to walk away from Joshua if he wants them to stay together.

Later in the evening, Joshua is preparing a gun in a bar while Jason starts packing at home after earning his mom's blessing to be with Lyric. Unbeknownst to Joshua, their good friend Rat notices him from the same bar and realizes his intentions. Rat informs Jason about Joshua's intent to kill Alonzo and anyone connected to him, including Lyric, as revenge. Joshua arrives at Lyric's house and shoots down Alonzo's two crew members before taking her hostage. Jason races there and finds Joshua holding Lyric at gunpoint, demanding Alonzo's whereabouts as well as venting his jealousy towards her for taking away his older brother. The two brothers engage in a heated argument until Jason becomes so fed up with his brother's continual selfishness and disregard for others' well-being that he draws his gun on Joshua to teach him a lesson. Unfortunately, Joshua accidentally shoots Lyric in the shoulder. Horrified and devastated, Jason tearfully tends to the injured and unconscious Lyric, and chooses to walk away from Joshua for good. Feeling abandoned, Joshua loses his will to live and shoots himself, in earshot of everyone outside. Though heartbroken, Jason carries Lyric to the waiting ambulance.

The film ends with Jason and the newly-recovered Lyric riding on a bus together, now earning their freedom to start a new life.

== Cast ==
- Allen Payne as Jason Alexander, the main protagonist. He is the "good" son who is responsible and always puts his family's well-being and happiness above his own. After falling for Lyric, he starts to feel torn between his family and his girlfriend.
  - Sean Hutchinson as Jason Alexander (age 11)
- Jada Pinkett as Lyric, Jason's love interest. She is a free-spirited waitress with a cold demeanor who initially has no interest in dating. She dreams of a good wig.
- Bokeem Woodbine as Joshua Alexander, Jason's younger brother. Although he is the "bad" son who is alcoholic, irresponsible, criminal-minded, and a troublemaker, he still loves his family. He is a problematic and low-level gangster.
  - Burleigh Moore as Joshua Alexander (age 8)
- Anthony 'Treach' Criss as Alonzo "A-1", Lyric's older brother, Marti's boyfriend and the vicious gang leader whom Joshua works with in a bank robbery.
- Eddie Griffin as "Rat", Jason and Joshua's good friend.
- Suzzanne Douglas as Gloria Alexander, Mad Dog's widow, Jason and Joshua's mother. She is a self-sufficient yet wise single mother who tries to love both her sons equally, following her husband's death. She occasionally remembers the times when her late husband used to be a good and loving man before turning abusive.
- Lisa Nicole Carson as Marti, Lyric's vain co-worker as well as best friend and Alonzo's girlfriend.
- Lahmard Tate as Ron, one of Alonzo's gang crew members.
- Forest Whitaker as "Mad Dog" Alexander, Gloria's late husband, and Jason and Joshua's late father. He used to be a loving family man, but he became abusive ever since he lost his leg after coming home from the Vietnam War as a veteran.
- Wayne Dehart as Street Preacher
- Redman as Gilbert

== Reception ==
Jason's Lyric received generally mixed reviews from critics. It currently has a 58% approval rating on Rotten Tomatoes based on 24 reviews, with an average score of 5.8/10. The site's consensus reads: "Jason's Lyric is a sexually charged film whose violent streak weakens or, depending on your perspective, supports the melodrama."

Roger Ebert gave the movie praise for its cast's performances, director Doug McHenry's "lyrical touches" to the poetic aesthetics of Bobby Smith, Jr.'s script and its willingness to tackle dramatic themes that New Jack City and Sugar Hill also explored, concluding that, "It's not some little plot-bound genre formula. It's invigorating, how much confidence it has, and how much space it allows itself." Deborah Young from Variety praised the performances of Whitaker, Payne and Woodbine, and the visual settings created by McHenry and cinematographer Francis Kenny but felt the film's script "stumbles into a lame love story and ends in a conventional shootout and bloodbath."

Peter Rainer of the Los Angeles Times called the film "a terribly earnest melodrama with king-size ambitions", commending the filmmakers for their overall attempt at artistic cinema but found it "overextended and unbelievable both as love story and as urban tragedy." In response to his review, filmmaker Jamaa Fanaka gave high praise to the film's two main leads, its supporting cast, and the direction of McHenry. He also counteracted Rainer's opinion of the sex scenes being there to raise the film's box office, saying that its target demographic want to see romantic stories that feature two black leads in said scenes, and that the film offers them a sort of "cinematic sexual healing."

Entertainment Weekly's Lisa Schwarzbaum gave it a C, writing that she found the brotherly storyline between Jason and Joshua more compelling than the main romantic plot, saying that the latter was "so dense with big themes strung together that character development suffers. And the emotional sum is less than the interconnection of its Tragedy 101 parts." In a review for The New York Times, Caryn James criticized the filmmaking for being overly stylized with its poetic aspirations and making the plot twist "unintentionally confusing rather than deliberately holding back information" with its editing. She called Jason's Lyric "a muddled film that takes a standard urban action movie and adds a veneer of overwrought romance."

== Stage play adaptation ==
It was announced by way of Instagram in December 2024 from stage playwright Je'Caryous Johnson, adapted the film into an off-Broadway stage production "Jason's Lyric: Live!", with a nationwide tour set to launch in early 2025. Allen Payne is also set to reprise his role as Jason Alexander, as well as Naughty by Nature star Treach, who will reprise his role as Alonzo "A-1". Eva Marcille, K. Michelle and Tyrin Turner have also been cast as top billing for the production.

The show is currently on tour in the US. It played in Richmond, VA, on April 2, 2025.

== See also ==
- Jason's Lyric (soundtrack) — soundtrack to the film.
- List of hood films
