= Not Another Church Movie =

2024 parody film by Johnny Mack

- Release poster
- Directed by: Johnny Mack
- Written by: Johnny Mack
- Produced by: James Michael Cummings; Jim Cardwell; Paul Saleba; Jaron Marquis; Johnny Mack; Vern Nobles Jr.
- Starring: Kevin Daniels; Vivica A. Fox; Lamorne Morris; Tisha Campbell; Jasmine Guy; Lydia Styslinger; James Michael Cummings; Kyla Pratt; Mickey Rourke; Jamie Foxx
- Cinematography: Vern Nobles Jr.
- Edited by: Taylor Nida
- Music by: Ainz "Brainz" Prasad; Ameya Saraf
- Production companies: JMC Media; Monty the Dog Productions
- Distributed by: Briarcliff Entertainment
- Release date: May 10, 2024
- Running time: 90 minutes
- Country: United States
- Language: English
- Box office: $576,242

Not Another Church Movie is a 2024 American parody film written and directed by Johnny Mack. It stars Kevin Daniels, Vivica A. Fox, Lamorne Morris, Tisha Campbell, Jasmine Guy, Lydia Styslinger, James Michael Cummings, Kyla Pratt, Mickey Rourke, and Jamie Foxx. It parodies the films of Tyler Perry.

== Plot ==
Taylor Pherry is a man who finds himself on a divine mission from God himself. Taylor is tasked with writing a movie inspired by his own crazy and dysfunctional family, in an effort to inspire people in his community. Meanwhile, the Devil has his own devious plans to disrupt Taylor's mission and turn everything upside down. Taylor navigates the challenges of his mission, dealing with the antics of his lovable but dysfunctional family and the interference of the Devil.

== Cast ==
- Kevin Daniels as Taylor Pherry / Madude
- Vivica A. Fox as Judge Loreal
- Kyla Pratt as Beverly
- Lamorne Morris as Monte Carlo
- Tisha Campbell as Flora Black
- Jasmine Guy as Miss Mildew
- Wayne Stamps as Moe Himms
- T'Shaun Barrett as Tallahassee / Darnell
- Brittney Jefferson as Ellen
- Lydia Styslinger as Mary (dtenographer)
- Luc Ashley as Hoprah Windfall
- Buddy Lewis as Michael Sr.
- Kearia Schroeder as Julie
- Yves B. Claude as Mr. Black
- James Michael Cummings as factory manager / white prison guard / police captain
- Mickey Rourke as the Devil
- Jamie Foxx as God
- Jaden Miller as Michael Junior
- Xaveria Baird as Calvin

== Production ==
The film was shot in Savannah, Georgia in 2022.

According to Daniels, Mack wanted Queen Latifah to play God.

== Release ==
The film was released in the United States on May 10, 2024. It was previously scheduled to be released in October 2023.

== Reception ==
On the review aggregator website Rotten Tomatoes, 13% of 8 critics' reviews are positive, with an average rating of 3.2/10.

Luke Y. Thompson of Comingsoon.net gave the film a negative review and wrote, "Perry aficionados ought to see it at least once, but it looks and feels so cheap that you’ll hate yourself for paying full price." Korey Coleman of Double Toasted also gave it a negative review, saying it would be hard to beat as the worst theatrically released film of 2024. He would ultimately deem it the worst theatrical film that he saw that year.
