= Tisha (album) =

Studio album by Tisha Campbell
- Released: January 4, 1993
- Recorded: 1992
- Genre: R&B
- Length: 54:22
- Label: Capitol
- Producers: Vassal Benford; Derek Bramble; David A. Williams; Dennis Williams; Donald Robinson

Singles from Tisha
- 1. "Push" Released: November 11, 1992; 2. "Love Me Down" Released: February 2, 1993

Professional ratings
Review scores
Source	Rating
AllMusic	2/5 stars

Tisha is the debut and only studio album by American actress-singer Tisha Campbell, which was released in 1993 by Capitol Records. The album features the singles "Push", which features backing vocals from fellow Martin co-star Tichina Arnold, and "Love Me Down". Following its release, the album failed to chart on the Billboard 200 or Hot R&B Albums charts and peaked at number 37 on Billboard's Heatseekers.

== Track listing ==
No.	Title	Writer(s)	Length
1.	"Love Me Down"	Vassal Benford; Alan "Byrd" Tatum	4:38
2.	"Push"	Valarie Davis; Steve Harvey; Lloyd Avery II	4:21
3.	"All Good Things (Come in Time)"	Derek Bramble	5:27
4.	"Wrap Your Love"	Stacy Habeeb; David Bellochio; Bramble	4:22
5.	"Broken Hearted"	Tisha Campbell; David A. Williams; Mona Campbell	5:08
6.	"Love's Got a Hold on Me"	Donald Robinson; Cathy Block	5:51
7.	"Round 'n' Round"	Benford; Ronald Spearman	4:57
8.	"The Feelin's Right"	Benford; Spearman	5:15
9.	"Why Won't You Love Me?"	T. Campbell; M. Campbell	4:53
10.	"If This is Love"	Bramble	4:15
11.	"Love Me Down" (L.A. Jay Extended Remix)		5:15

- "Round 'n' Round" contains a sample from "N.E. Heartbreak" by New Edition.

== Charts ==
Chart (1993)	Peak position
US Heatseekers Albums (Billboard)	37

=== Singles ===
Year	Title	Peak position	
Year	Title	US Pop	US R&B
1992	"Push"	–	31
1993	"Love Me Down"	–	–
