= Outlaw Johnny Black =

2023 film by Michael Jai White

- Theatrical release poster
- Directed by: Michael Jai White
- Written by: Michael Jai White; Byron Keith Minns
- Produced by: Donovan de Boer; Michael Jai White; Grant Gilmore; Byron Keith Minns
- Starring: Michael Jai White; Anika Noni Rose; Erica Ash; Byron Keith Minns; Kevin Chapman; Kym Whitley; Tommy Davidson; Buddy Lewis; Chris Browning; Barry Bostwick; Gary Anthony Williams; Tony Baker; Glynn Turman
- Cinematography: Keith L. Smith
- Edited by: Scott Richter; Ryan Eaton
- Music by: Michael Bearden
- Production company: Jaigantic Studios
- Distributed by: Samuel Goldwyn Films
- Release date: September 15, 2023
- Running time: 135 minutes
- Country: United States
- Language: English
- Box office: $319,848

Outlaw Johnny Black is a 2023 American western comedy film directed by Michael Jai White, who co-wrote the script with Byron Keith Minns. It is a spiritual sequel to Black Dynamite, with White and Minns reprising their roles. It was released theatrically on September 15, 2023, and received mixed reviews from film critics.

== Plot ==
In the town of Cheyanne, Johnny Black arrives and sees an Indian kid being beaten up by white men. Johnny tries to rescue the kid, but is overpowered and jailed. Johnny warns that Brett Clayton is going to rob the bank, and sure enough he does, while also murdering several innocent people.

In a flashback, it is revealed that many years ago, when Johnny's dad and mom were Exhibition shooters, Brett challenged Johnny's dad to a Quick Draw Duel, murdering him when he was unarmed.

When Johnny is about to be hanged, he is saved by Indians and rides away on a horse, but the horse dies of thirst. Johnny is rescued once again by a preacher called Percy, but some Indians shoot Percy down unconscious, while Johnny flees in a horse carriage. Percy is later revived and forced to marry the Indian Chief's daughter.

Johnny rides to the neighboring town and poses as Percy, whose girlfriend Bessie hugs Johnny mistaking him to be Percy, since she has never seen him, only having shared letters. Johnny learns that Tom is the baron who is trying to steal the land from the townsfolk. The next day, the real Percy arrives there having escaped the Indians, but Johnny convinces everyone that the Percy is actually Deacon.

That night, Johnny finds a map pointing to a hidden treasure and attempts to locate it, while Bessie sleeps with Percy mistaking him for Johnny. Bessie's sister Jessie Lee chats and makes friends with Johnny. The next day at church, Johnny is forced to give a sermon, and repeats the talk on forgiveness given by his father on the last day of his life, leaving the congregation very impressed. The two sisters Bessie and Jessie confront Johnny about the previous night's indiscretions, and angrily break up with him.

A fight starts at the local bar, and Marshal Cove guesses Johnny's real identity. Johnny says he knows why Tom is interested in the land and shows Cove the treasure map, but Tom's henchman Eddie overhears their conversation and shoots down Cove. Johnny shows Jessie the map, and they realize that Tom wants the oil on the property, and is willing to kill everyone on his path.

Tom kidnaps Jessie, and demands the deed to the land be signed within a day. Percy and Bessie reconcile and get together, but Johnny is thrown in jail for shooting Cove. Percy visits Johnny and gives him a Bible which contains a key to the jail cell, using which Johnny frees himself and Jessie, and shoots down Tom's men. Brett arrives with his men, threatening to kill everyone in the town, but Percy appears with the Indians, as do Marshal Cove and Johnny. A fight ensues, when Johnny shoots down Brett, finally avenging his father's death.

Money is coming to the town, Johnny is elected the new sheriff and everyone dances in celebration.

== Cast ==
- Michael Jai White as Outlaw Johnny Black
- Anika Noni Rose as Jessie Lee
- Erica Ash as Bessie Lee
- Byron Keith Minns as Reverend Percy
- Chris Browning as Brett Clayton
- Barry Bostwick as Tom Sheally
- Randy Couture as Bill Basset
- Kevin Chapman as U.S. Marshal Cove
- Kym Whitley as Sister Betty
- Tommy Davidson as Clancy
- Buddy Lewis as Deacon Fry
- Gary Anthony Williams as Mayor Williams
- Tony Baker as Sherriff Yarbrough
- Eme Ikwuakor as Elmer
- Jalyn Hall as Young Johnny Black
- Donald Cerrone as Crackshot Bob
- Jill Scott as Maw Belle
- Roger Yuan as Lee
- Tomm Voss as Kane
- Michael Madsen as Dutch
- Josh Barnett as Bobo
- Glynn Turman as Bullseye Black
- Paul Sloan as Eddie
- Heath Freeman as Jed Clayton
- Russell Peters as Big Chief

== Release ==
Outlaw Johnny Black was released by Samuel Goldwyn Films on September 15, 2023. In the United States and Canada it opened to $178,176 in 307 theaters, and grossed a total of $319,848.

== Reception ==
On the review aggregator website Rotten Tomatoes, 66% of 29 critics' reviews are positive, with an average rating of 5.9/10. Metacritic, which uses a weighted average, assigned the film a score of 54 out of 100, based on five critics, indicating "mixed or average" reviews.

Joe Leydon of Variety wrote that the film was "not nearly as free-wheeling and fleet-footed as Black Dynamite, the 2009 satirical comedy that cast White as a Shaft-like action hero, the new film nonetheless provides more than a few good laughs, even when it seems to be taking horse opera clichés a tad too respectfully, and showcases a fine cast of actors dedicated to both the silliness and the seriousness of the enterprise". RogerEbert.com's Rendy Jones gave the film a score of two and half out of four and wrote, "Though it takes too long to get his gun out, Outlaw Johnny Black is a well-crafted and funny Spaghetti Western comedy with a refreshing goofiness and a delightful lead".

Sarah-Tai Black writing for Los Angeles Times said, "Overall, Outlaw Johnny Black mostly seems unsure of how to navigate its Monty Python-inspired parodic impulses alongside its clear reverence for the genre. Instead, White has offered a jumbled array of all-too-well-trod tropes and stereotypes that, all in all, can't seem to hit the mark in terms of finding the sweet spot of being "so bad it's good"." Writing for The New York Times, Brandon Yu felt the film "struggles to establish a comedic rhythm" and went on to say "the laughs are lost within an overly long, meandering plot and scenes that miss visual polish or comedic concision".

== Legacy ==
Outlaw Johnny Black is the final film appearance of Erica Ash due to her death in 2024.
