= Jerod Mixon =

American actor (born 1981)

- Born: May 24, 1981 (age 45); Port Hueneme, California, U.S.
- Other name: Big Tyme
- Occupations: Actor; comedian; producer; writer
- Years active: 1997–present
- Family: Jamal Mixon (brother)

Jerod Mixon (born May 24, 1981) is an American actor, comedian, producer, and writer. He is known for portraying Weensie in Old School. He is the older brother of actor Jamal Mixon. He also produced and starred in the 2013 urban comedy musical film White T.

== Career ==
Mixon distinguished himself as an actor in his role as Shonté Jr. Baileygates, the son of Jim Carrey's lead character in Me, Myself & Irene. Mixon also had a prominent role in the 2002 film The New Guy. He played a small part in an episode of Scrubs as an obese patient named Herbert in the episode "My New Suit". He voiced Theo in 52 episodes of the PBS animated series Maya & Miguel.

== Filmography ==
=== Film ===
Year	Title	Role	Notes
1997	Def Jam's How to Be a Player	Kid #1	
1998	Bulworth	Little Gangsta	
1999	Beverly Hood	Boy #2	
2000	Me, Myself & Irene	Shonté Jr.	
2001	House Party 4: Down to the Last Minute	Bertha	
2001	Longshot	Jerod Mixon	
2002	The New Guy	Kirk	
2003	Old School	Weensie	
2004	The Cookout	Willie	
2004	Kel Videos Live: This Face Belongs on the Tube	The Mighty Meaty Thugs	
2008	Senior Skip Day	Barry the Shithouse	
2009	Steppin: The Movie	Deadweight	
2013	White T	Herbert Weatherspoon	
2015	Crackula Goes to Hollywood	Big Tyme	
2022	Off-Time	Ernest the Paperboy	

=== Television ===
Year	Title	Role	Notes
1997	Malcolm & Eddie	William	Episode: "Sibling Rivalry"
1997	Moesha	Larry's Brother	Episode: "Break It Down"
1998	Good News	Marvin	Episode: "Amazing Grace"
2004–2008	Maya & Miguel	Theo	52 episodes
2006	Scrubs	Herbert	Episode: "My New Suit"
