= House Party (2023 film) =

2023 film by Calmatic

- Theatrical release poster
- Directed by: Calmatic
- Screenplay by: Jamal Olori; Stephen Glover
- Based on: House Party by Reginald Hudlin
- Produced by: LeBron James; Maverick Carter
- Starring: Tosin Cole; Jacob Latimore; Karen Obilom; D.C. Young Fly; Scott Mescudi
- Cinematography: Andrew Huebscher
- Edited by: Matthew Barbato
- Music by: Oak Felder
- Production companies: New Line Cinema; SpringHill Company
- Distributed by: Warner Bros. Pictures
- Release date: January 13, 2023
- Running time: 98 minutes
- Country: United States
- Language: English
- Box office: $9.3 million

House Party is a 2023 American comedy film directed by Calmatic (in his feature directorial debut) from a screenplay by Jamal Olori and Stephen Glover. It serves as a reboot of the 1990 film of the same name and the sixth installment in the House Party franchise. The film stars Tosin Cole, Jacob Latimore, Karen Obilom, D.C. Young Fly, and Scott Mescudi. Its plot follows two young aspiring club promoters working as house cleaners who throw a party at their latest job site: LeBron James' mansion.

House Party was released in the United States on January 13, 2023, by Warner Bros. Pictures. The film received mixed reviews and grossed over $9 million worldwide.

== Plot ==
In Los Angeles, Kevin and Damon are two best friends who work as house cleaners and aspiring club promoters; Kevin also aspires to make music and get a steady income to support himself and his young daughter Destiny. The two of them are dropped from a promotion gig by Kyle and his gang (Guile and Larry) due to Damon having illicit involvement with Guile's cousin. While the two of them are working at a mansion, Kevin is informed by his childhood friend and current supervisor Venus that he and Damon will be fired due to cameras catching them goofing off on the job. Damon finds out that the mansion they are cleaning belongs to LeBron James, who is in India on a two-week meditation retreat, and proposes that he and Kevin host a party there for LeBron's celebrity contacts. Kevin, now desperate for money due to him knowing he's fired and not starting his new IT job for another 2 months hesitantly joins in on the plan. Kevin asks Venus to supply him and Damon with the keys to the mansion, and she very reluctantly agrees.

Damon and Kevin market the party as a secret event to avoid alerting the police, and the event starts out as a success. However, Kyle and his gang find out about it after no one shows up to their own party, and take advantage of a lapse in security to break into LeBron's trophy room and steal his Cleveland Cavaliers 2016 championship ring. Kevin grows distressed over the damage happening to the mansion and confronts Damon over his flippant disregard for everything around him. Damon is later beaten up by Kyle and his gang, but then sees his idol Mya. Mya offers for Damon to leave the party with her, but Damon declines in order to help Kevin keep the party from falling apart.

Damon and Kevin find out that LeBron's ring has been stolen, and try desperately to find it. Kid Cudi tells them that the Illuminati possesses a copy of every sports championship ring, and the duo are desperate enough to take up his offer. Venus volunteers to run the party in their absence, and she and Kevin kiss. Kid Cudi sneaks Damon and Kevin into an Illuminati convention where they successfully steal the ring, but are exposed when they inadvertently invoke God's name. The Illuminati force them into a gladiator fight, but Kid Cudi sacrifices himself to allow them to live, entrusting them with a poem he wrote for LeBron's eyes only.

Damon and Kevin arrive back at the mansion to return the ring and end the party, but are interrupted by LeBron who returned from his trip early. LeBron intends to have the duo arrested, but Damon claims Kevin was not involved in the party and makes a wager that LeBron will let him go if he can beat the NBA superstar in a pickup basketball game. LeBron wins easily, and Damon is hauled off by the police. Kevin is forced to give LeBron the money he and Damon made, which the latter gives to charity.

However, upon reading Kid Cudi's poem, LeBron has a change of heart and works to get Damon released early from his jail sentence, following which he is picked up by Mya. Kyle and his gang are arrested after trying to sell LeBron's ring and the party causes Kevin to gain recognition and make money from his music.

Back in the Illuminati mansion, Kid Cudi is brought back to life.

== Cast ==
- Jacob Latimore as Kevin
- Tosin Cole as Damon
- Karen Obilom as Venus
- D.C. Young Fly as Vic
- Chinedu Unaka as Sly
- Shakira Ja'nai Paye as Mika
- Melvin Gregg as Larry
- Andrew Santino as Peter
- Allen Maldonado as Kyle
- Rotimi as Guile

=== Cameos ===
- Kid Cudi
- Mya
- LeBron James
- Watts Homie Quan
- Walter Emanuel Jones
- Nakia Burrise
- GaTa
- Snoop Dogg
- Juvenile
- Tinashe
- Carl Anthony Payne II
- Tristan Thompson
- Lil Wayne
- Odell Beckham Jr.
- Mark Cuban
- Jamal Olori
- Kid 'n Play
- Anthony Davis
- Lena Waithe
- Chauncey Hit-Boy Hollis
- Big Sean
- Karrueche Tran

== Production ==
In February 2018, it was announced that New Line Cinema was developing a remake of House Party with LeBron James and Maverick Carter producing under their production company SpringHill Entertainment. Stephen Glover and Jamal Olori were attached to write the adaptation. In September 2019, it was announced that Calmatic had joined the production as director. The film was scheduled to be released exclusively on HBO Max via streaming.

In April 2021, Jorge Lendeborg Jr. and Tosin Cole were cast in lead roles. DC Young Fly joined the cast, followed in June by Karen Obilom, Melvin Gregg, Rotimi, Allen Maldonado, Shakira Ja'nai Paye, Andrew Santino, and Bill Bellamy. By July 2021, Lendeborg Jr. was replaced by Jacob Latimore, following the former's departure from the project to focus on improving his mental health. That same month, Tamera Kissen was cast in a supporting role.

Principal photography began on July 2, 2021, in Los Angeles. Production was suspended later that month due to nine positive cases of COVID-19 reported, although only one was part of the production staff, while the rest were extras. Filming subsequently resumed on August 2, 2021.

== Release ==
House Party was theatrically released by Warner Bros. Pictures in the United States on January 13, 2023. It was originally set for a digital-only release on HBO Max on July 28, 2022, but was removed from Warner Bros' release schedule on July 11, 2022, just 17 days before release, before being changed in August to a theatrical release of December 9, 2022 as part of a restructuring plan for film distribution at Warner Bros. that would see the studio relying less on HBO Max-only releases and more on theatrical releases. In October 2022, it was delayed to its current release date.

The film was released for VOD on January 31, 2023, and was released on Blu-ray and DVD on February 14, 2023. It was released on HBO Max on March 3, 2023.

== Reception ==
=== Box office ===
In the United States and Canada, House Party was released, together with Plane and the wide expansion of A Man Called Otto, and was projected to gross around $5 million from 1,400 theaters in its opening weekend. It ended up debuting to $4 million, finishing sixth.

=== Critical response ===
On the review aggregator website Rotten Tomatoes, 28% of 39 critics' reviews are positive, with an average rating of 4.6/10. The website's consensus reads: "Keeping the same basic outline but almost entirely forgetting the original's sense of fun, this unnecessary remake proves a House Party divided against itself cannot stand." Metacritic, which uses a weighted average, assigned the film a score of 41 out of 100, based on 15 critics, indicating "mixed or average" reviews.
