= Buddy Lewis (comedian) =

American actor and comedian

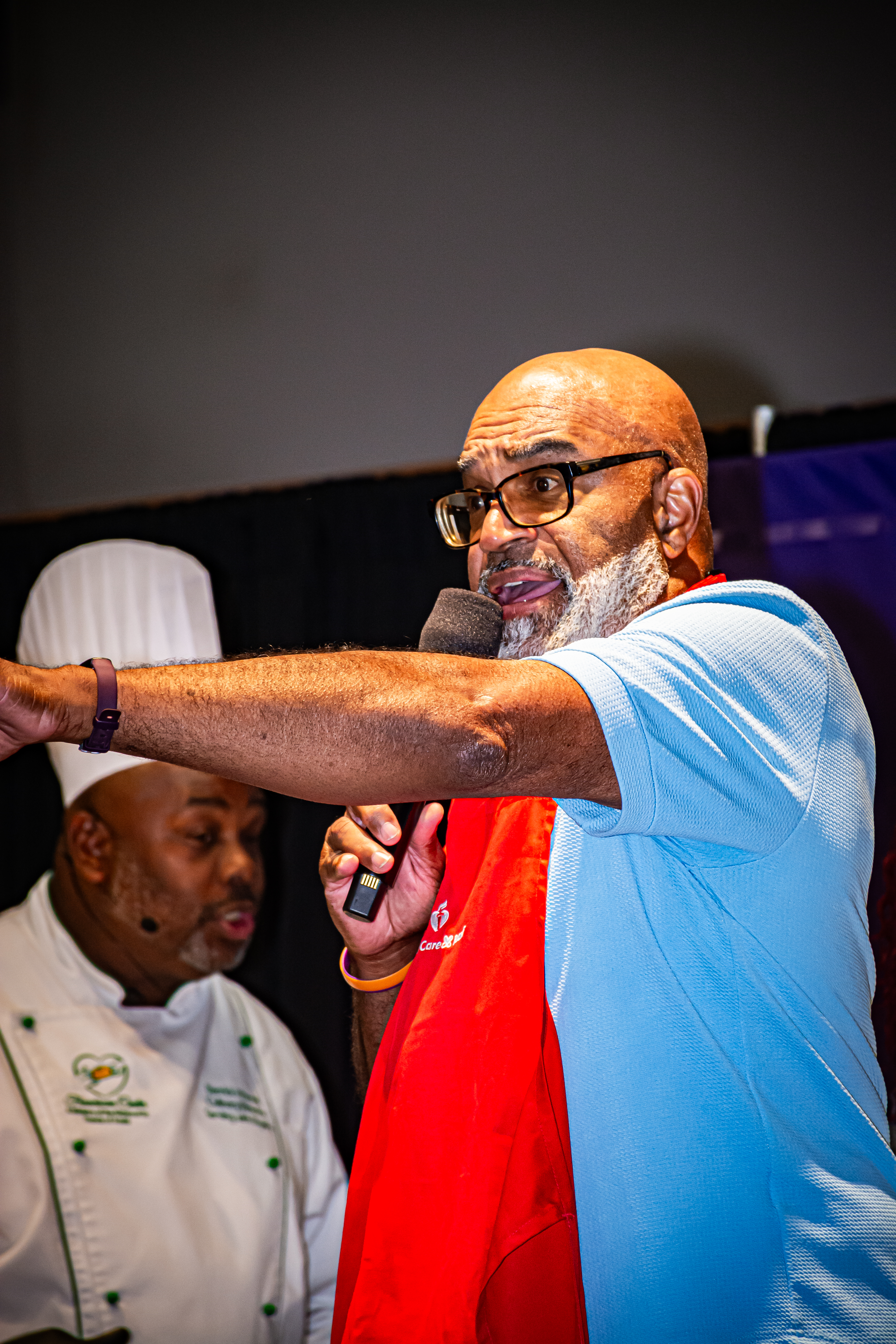
- Lewis at Congressional Black Caucus ALC54 2025
- Born: April 14, 1963 (age 63); Gary, Indiana, U.S.
- Occupations: Actor; comedian; writer
- Years active: 1989–present

Roland "Buddy" Lewis (born April 14, 1963) is an American comedian, actor, writer and voice-over artist.

== Background ==
Lewis was born in Gary, Indiana, and known from birth as "Buddy". He graduated from Howard University and moved to Los Angeles to pursue a career in entertainment.

Recent film credits include Black Dynamite, The Chosen One, Robosapien: Rebooted, and The Group. Buddy Lewis recently appeared as himself on the stand-up comedy series, "Martin Lawrence's 1st Amendment" and on the sit-down comedy series Comics Unleashed hosted by Byron Allen.

His writing credits include host writer for D. L. Hughley and Jamie Foxx, script writer or staff writing on multiple television programs, and freelance script writer for Tyler Perry's House of Payne.

In 2017, he co-created the sitcom White Famous, starring Jay Pharoah and based on the life of comedian Jamie Foxx.

He is a former member of the improvisational group The Comedy Act Players. He is also a member of Omega Psi Phi fraternity (Alpha chapter).

Buddy Lewis is an avid golfer and self-proclaimed "World's Greatest Comic Golfer". He developed and produced a vlog series "Buddy Lewis, The World's Greatest Comic Golfer". The series features golf matches with his celebrity comedian contenders-friends, comedic commentary, and his topical observations.

== Personal life ==
He has a daughter named Asha who runs a successful blog on Tumblr.

== Awards ==
- NAACP Theatre Awards: Best Supporting Actor for The Fabric of a Man (written by David E. Talbert) (2003)
- NAACP Theatre Awards: Best Supporting Actor for Pearl (written by Debbie Allen) (2004)

== Filmography ==
=== Film ===
| Year | Title | Role | Notes |
|---|---|---|---|
| 1998 | Woo | Bartender | |
| 1999 | Thicker than Water | Comedian | |
| 1999 | Beverly Hood | Reverend/Aunt Gert | |
| 2000 | Retiring Tatiana | Brown Sugar Bear | |
| 2001 | The Brothers | Steve on the Strip | |
| 2001 | House Party 4: Down to the Last Minute | Uncle Charles Lester | Video |
| 2003 | Love Chronicles | Male Nurse | |
| 2004 | Out on Parole | Caldwell | Video |
| 2005 | The Fabric of a Man | Uncle Ray | Video |
| 2005 | Love on Layaway | Renzo | Video |
| 2007 | Big Stan | Cleon | |
| 2008 | Pathology | Harper Johnson | |
| 2009 | Black Dynamite | "Gunsmoke" | |
| 2009 | Man of Her Dreams | Cletous Jones | |
| 2009 | The Perfect Gift | Frank White | |
| 2010 | Group Sex | Sex Addict #2 | |
| 2010 | The Chosen One | NY Doorman | |
| 2011 | A Mother's Love | Repo Man | |
| 2012 | Back Then | Gary Goodson | |
| 2012 | Christmas in Compton | Mr. Hubbard | |
| 2013 | Robosapien: Rebooted | Charles | |
| 2013 | My Sister's Wedding | Uncle Jimmy | |
| 2015 | Different Position | Coach Gary | Short |
| 2016 | Restored Me | Pastor Louis Waterfiled | |
| 2016 | Unknown Ground Air & Electricity | Sweet Feet | Short |
| 2017 | Quality Problems | Alonzo | |
| 2018 | Alcoholocaust | Principal Fisher | Short |
| 2018 | The Counter: 1960 | Robert | Short |
| 2020 | Trade | Mr. Wells | Short |
| 2020 | 2 Minutes of Fame | Police Officer | |
| 2022 | You Married Dat | Juhahn's Dad | |
| 2023 | Kings of L.A. | Ernie T. | |
| 2023 | Back on the Strip | Max | |
| 2023 | Outlaw Johnny Black | Deacon Fry | |
| 2023 | The Drone That Saved Christmas | Rudolpho | |
| 2023 | Momma Said Come Home for Christmas | Poppa | |
| 2024 | Not Another Church Movie | Michael Sr. | |
| 2024 | Dead Wrong | Angelo | |
| 2025 | War Dawgz | Fred Mason | |

=== Television ===
| Year | Title | Role | Notes |
|---|---|---|---|
| 1991 | Little Shop | Junior (voice) | Main Cast |
| 1992 | Def Comedy Jam | Himself | Episode: "Episode #2.5" |
| 1994 | Martin | Man #1 | Episode: "Guard Your Grill" |
| 1996 | Martin | Aggravated Man | Episode: "Why Can't We Be Friends: Part 1" |
| 1996 | In the House | T.D. | Episode: "Bury the Hatchet" |
| 1998 | Sabrina the Teenage Witch | Policeman | Episode: "Christmas Amnesia" |
| 2000 | The Jamie Foxx Show | Davis | Episode: "Double or Nothing" |
| 2001 | The Parkers | Mack Daddy #2 | Episode: "Take the Cookies and Run" |
| 2003 | Yes, Dear | Dealer | Episode: "Hustlin' Hughes" |
| 2005 | Boston Legal | Wesson | Episode: "Gone" |
| 2006 | Cuts | Himself | Episode: "Rogue Trip" |
| 2006 | The Suite Life of Zack & Cody | Vinnie | Episode: "Boston Tea Party" |
| 2006 | That's So Raven | Father | Episode: "Sister Act" |
| 2006 | Reno 911! | Fake FBI #1 | Episode: "Spanish Mike Comes Back" |
| 2006 | Drake & Josh | Animal Control | Episode: "Vicious Tiberius" |
| 2009 | 1st Amendment Stand Up | Himself | Episode: "Dick Gregory/Buddy Lewis/Nikki Carr" |
| 2011 | Traffic Light | Police Officer | Episode: "Help Wanted" |
| 2012 | Let's Stay Together | Dr. Dennis | Episode: "Puppy Love" |
| 2012–2013 | For Richer or Poorer | Carson | Recurring Cast |
| 2013 | JD Lawrence's Community Service | Sylvester | Main Cast |
| 2013 | Real Husbands of Hollywood | Reporter #2 | Episode: "Hart vs. Mosley" |
| 2014 | One Love | Deacon Frock | Episode: "Breaking Up Blues" |
| 2015 | Real Rob | Officer Smith | Episode: "VIP Treatment" |
| 2015–2016 | Da Jammies | Klondell (voice) | Recurring Cast |
| 2016 | Unsung Hollywood | Himself | Episode: "Guy and Joe Torry" |
| 2016 | Real Husbands of Hollywood | Himself | Episode: "Trina Sister" |
| 2017 | The New Edition Story | Emcee | Episode: "Part 1" |
| 2017 | Lawd Have Mercy | Himself/Co-Host | Main Co-Host |
| 2019 | The Donors | Ben | Episode: "Hatched" |
| 2020 | Talk Golfing to Me | Himself | Episode: "Is Golf all about the distance?" |
| 2020 | The Family Business | Wendell | Recurring Cast: Season 2 |
| 2021 | Swapping Ignorance | Willie Wood | Episode: "The Smuggle Is Real" |
| 2021–2022 | Millennials | Bernie Davis | Recurring Cast |
| 2025 | The Upshaws | Robbie | Episode: "Who, Me?" |
| 2025 | Mind Your Business | Nigel | Episode: "The Generational Bridge" |
