= Robin Harris (comedian) =

American comedian and actor (1953–1990)

Robin Harris Sr.
- Harris in 1989
- Born: Robin Hughes Harris; August 30, 1953; Chicago, Illinois, U.S.
- Died: March 18, 1990 (aged 36); Chicago, Illinois, U.S.
- Spouse: Exetta Harris (m. 1984)
- Children: 1

Comedy career
- Years active: 1979–1990
- Medium: Stand-up comedy, film, television
- Genres: Satire; observational comedy; improvisational comedy
- Subjects: African-American culture; sexuality; everyday life; race

Robin Hughes Harris Sr. (August 30, 1953 – March 18, 1990) was an American comedian and actor, best known for his recurring comic sketch about "Bé-bé's Kids". He was posthumously nominated for the Independent Spirit Award for Best Supporting Male for his performance in the film House Party.

== Early life ==
Harris was born in Chicago, Illinois. His father, Earl, was a welder, and his mother, Mattie, was a factory seamstress. In 1961, the family moved to Los Angeles, where he attended Manual Arts High School. Harris then attended Ottawa University in Kansas. During this time, he began to hone his craft of comedy. He worked for Hughes Aircraft, a rental car company, and Security Pacific Bank to pay his bills. In 1980, he debuted in Hollywood at The Comedy Store.

== Career ==
During the mid-1980s, Harris worked as the master of ceremonies at the Comedy Act Theater. His "old school" brand of humor began to gain him a mainstream following. Harris made his acting debut playing a bartender in I'm Gonna Git You Sucka. He also appeared in Do the Right Thing and Harlem Nights. Shortly before his death, Harris played the father of Kid in House Party (1990) and had a small role as a jazz club MC in Mo' Better Blues.

The second episode of sketch comedy show In Living Color aired just over a month after his death, and was dedicated to his memory. In 2006, a posthumous DVD, titled We Don't Die, We Multiply: The Robin Harris Story, was released. The film features never-before-seen performances by Harris and accolades from such contemporaries as Martin Lawrence, Bernie Mac, Cedric the Entertainer, D. L. Hughley, Robert Townsend, and Joe Torry. The film also features a rap performed and dedicated to Harris by his son, Robin Jr.

=== Bé-bé's Kids ===
In Harris' "Bé-bé's Kids" routines, Harris' girlfriend Jamika would insist that he take her son and her friend Bé-bé's three children with them on a date, as she continually agreed to babysit them. The children would regularly make a fool out of and/or annoy Harris. "We Bé-bé's kids", they would proclaim, "we don't die...we multiply."

The Hudlin Brothers had intended to make a feature film based upon the "Bé-bé's Kids" sketches, but when Harris died while the film was in pre-production, Bebe's Kids instead became an animated feature. It was directed by Bruce W. Smith and featured the voices of Faizon Love (as Harris), Vanessa Bell Calloway, Marques Houston, Nell Carter, Jonell Green, Rich Little, and Tone Lōc.

== Death ==
On March 18, 1990, Harris died at the age of 36 from cardiac arrhythmia at the Chicago's Four Seasons Hotel. He collapsed in his hotel suite, where he was staying while he performed at the Regal Theater. His brother found him unresponsive. Harris was transported back to California and interred in an indoor mausoleum at Inglewood Park Cemetery, near Los Angeles.

At the time of Harris' March 1990 death, his wife was pregnant with their son, Robin Harris Jr., who was born six months later, in September 1990.

== Award nominations ==
Year	Award	Result	Category	Film or series
1991	Independent Spirit Award	Nominated	Best Supporting Male	House Party
