= Jamal Mixon =

American actor (born 1983)

- Born: June 17, 1983 (age 42); Oxnard, California, U.S.
- Occupation: Actor
- Years active: 1995–present
- Family: Jerod Mixon (brother)

Jamal Mixon (born June 17, 1983) is an American actor. He is best known for his role as Ernie Klump Jr. in the film The Nutty Professor, and its sequel, Nutty Professor II: The Klumps. He is the younger brother of actor Jerod Mixon.

== Career ==
Mixon's other acting credits include the television series Malcolm & Eddie, Moesha, The Parkers, Good News, The Proud Family and George Lopez. He also appeared in the films Def Jam's How to Be a Player (1997), Bulworth (1998), House Party 4: Down to the Last Minute (2001), The Cookout (2004), Gridiron Gang (2006), Paul Blart: Mall Cop (2009), Steppin: The Movie (2009), and White T (2013).

== Filmography ==
=== Film ===
Year	Title	Role	Notes
1996	The Nutty Professor	Ernie Klump Jr.	Acting debut
1997	Def Jam's How to Be a Player	Kid #2	
1998	Bulworth	Little Gangsta	
1999	Beverly Hood	Boy #1	
2000	Nutty Professor II: The Klumps	Ernie Klump Jr.	
2001	House Party 4: Down to the Last Minute	Heidi	
2001	Longshot	Jamal Mixon	
2004	The Cookout	Nelson	
2006	Gridiron Gang	Jamal Evans	
2008	Senior Skip Day	Harry The Shithouse	
2009	Paul Blart: Mall Cop	Leon	
2009	Steppin: The Movie	Tugboat	
2012	Zambezia	Ezee	Voice
2013	White T	Henry Weatherspoon	
2015	Crackula Goes to Hollywood	Herculeez	
2018	16 Bars	Bubba	

=== Television ===
Year	Title	Role	Notes
1997	Malcolm & Eddie	Perry	Episode: "Sibling Rivalry"
1997	Moesha	Larry	Episode: "Break It Down"
1998	Good News	Melvin	Episode: "Amazing Grace"
1998	Cousin Skeeter	Richie	Episode: "Blast from the Past"
2000–2002	The Parkers	Alan / Young Oglevee	6 episodes
2002	The Proud Family	Ray Ray Junior	Episode: "Behind Family Lines"
2004	George Lopez	Lawrence	Episode: "Angie Gets Tanked"
2015	The Big Leaf	Earl Webster	Television film
2017	It's Always Sunny in Philadelphia	Black Dennis	Episode: "The Gang Turns Black"
