= House Party 4: Down to the Last Minute =

2001 film by Chris Stokes

- Official DVD cover
- Directed by: Chris Stokes
- Written by: Marcus Warren; Chris Stokes
- Produced by: Cassius Weathersby
- Starring: Marques Houston; Jerome Jones; Kelton "LDB" Kessee; Buddy Lewis; Alexis Fields; Kym Whitley; Meagan Good; Dorien Wilson; Mari Morrow; Dwan Smith
- Cinematography: Todd A. Dos Reis
- Edited by: Chris Maybach
- Music by: Tom Moore
- Production companies: New Line Cinema; Ultimate Group Films
- Distributed by: New Line Home Video
- Release date: August 14, 2001
- Running time: 80 minutes
- Country: United States
- Language: English

House Party 4: Down to the Last Minute is a 2001 American direct-to-video comedy film. It is the standalone sequel to House Party 3 (1994) and fourth installment in the House Party franchise as it has no connection to any of the preceding films or the subsequent film House Party: Tonight's the Night. It stars IMx, and is the first film in the series to not star Kid 'n Play. This is IMx's second House Party film; they also appeared in House Party 3 when they were known as Immature and portrayed entirely different characters than they do in this film.

== Plot ==
Jon-Jon sees a ripe opportunity for a major party when he snags the job house-sitting for his rich Uncle Charles. The mansion comes with a platinum colored Mercedes-Benz 430 and, although Uncle Charles has told him not to drive the car or have people over, Jon-Jon wastes no time in doing both; Jon-Jon is not only having an "entertainment party", but he's auditioning his hip-hop band (IMx) for a record executive. When Jon-Jon finds out his uncle is coming home earlier than announced, he has to race against time to try to put everything back the way he found it.

== Cast ==
- Marques "Batman" Houston as Jon "Jon-Jon" Harris Jr.
- Kelton "LDB" Kessee as "T"
- Jerome "Romeo" Jones as Mark
- Buddy Lewis as Charles Lester
- Alexis Fields as Monique Harris
- Kym Whitley as Judy Lester Harris
- Meagan Good as Tina Johnson
- Dorien Wilson as Jon Harris Sr.
- Mari Morrow as Linda Lester
- Dwan Smith as Mrs. Dixon
- Irene Stokes as Mable Lester
- Jerod "Big Time" Mixon as Bertha
- Jamal "Hercules" Mixon as Heidi
- Giorgi-o as Flight Attendant
- Henrietta Komras as Mrs. Tupay
- Chris Stokes as Ray "Ray-Ray"
- Nick Testa as "Nightbeast"

== Sequel ==
At the end of the film, Jon Jon and Monique hint at a sequel centering on Monique as the protagonist. That film, however, was never produced. The next film in the series, House Party: Tonight's the Night starring Tequan Richmond and Zac Goodspeed, was released direct to DVD on July 23, 2013; that film is a direct continuation of House Party 3, and disregards the events of House Party 4: Down to the Last Minute. Kid 'n Play, the franchise's original leads, make an appearance at the end of the film, reprising their roles from the first three films. It is revealed that the two have gone on to be successful music producers just as they aspired to in the second and third films.
