= Calmatic =

American filmmaker

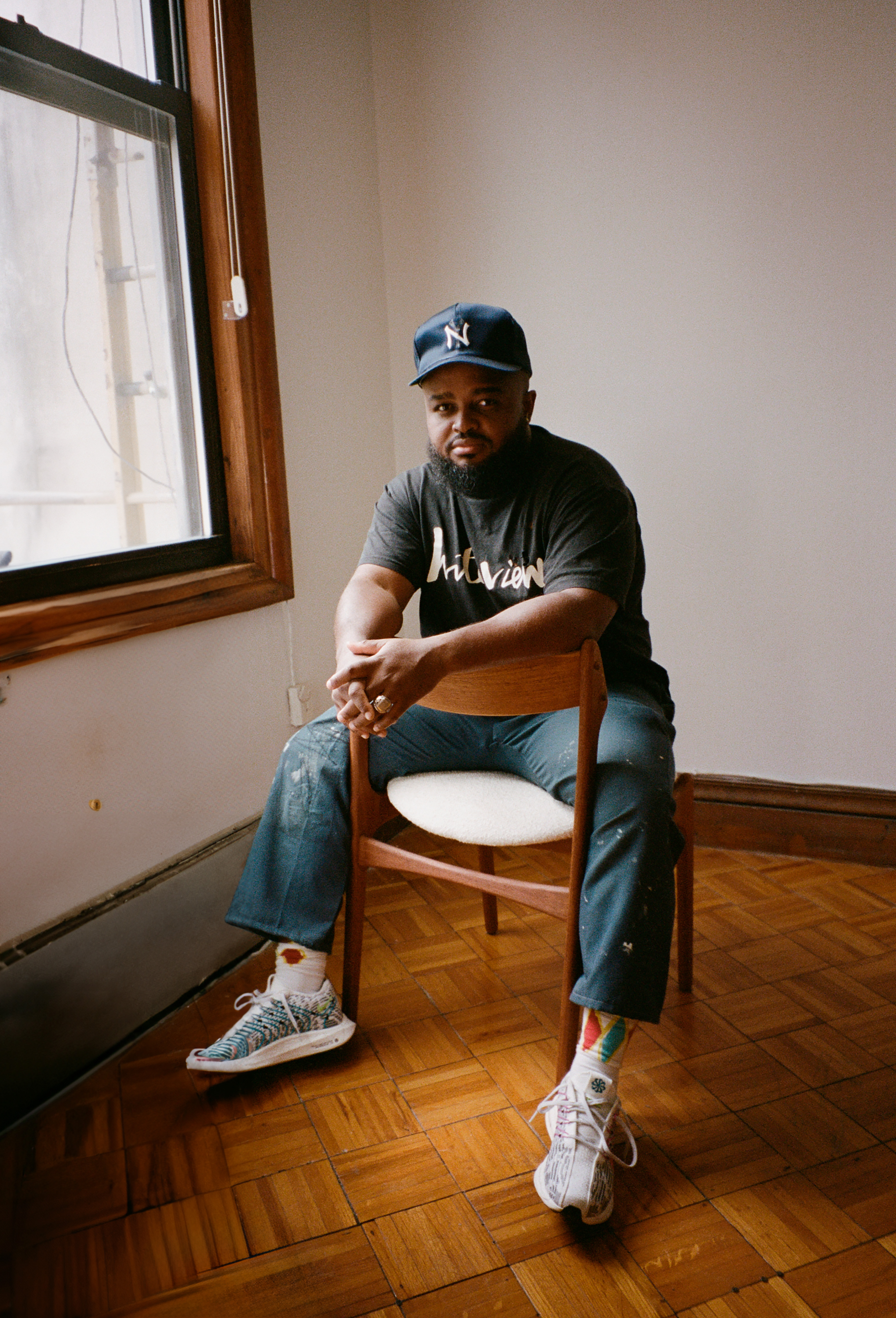
- Calmatic in 2023
- Born: Charles Kidd II; September 25, 1987 (age 38); Los Angeles, California, U.S.
- Occupations: Director; writer; artist; fashion designer
- Years active: 2008–present
- Website: calmatic.net

Charles Kidd II (born September 25, 1987), known professionally as Calmatic, is an American filmmaker. He is known for directing several notable commercials and music videos as well as the films House Party (2023) and White Men Can’t Jump (2023), both of which were remakes.

== Early life ==
Calmatic was born Charles Kidd II on September 25, 1987. He was raised in South Central Los Angeles. This location would go on to provide inspiration for his films and music videos. He has cited both Spike Lee and Spike Jonze as inspirations. He graduated from University High School in 2005.

== Career ==
Calmatic gained widespread fame in 2019 for directing the video for "Old Town Road" by Lil Nas X featuring Billy Ray Cyrus, which won the 2019 MTV Video Music Award for Best Direction and the 2020 Grammy Award for Best Music Video. He has also worked with Kendrick Lamar, Childish Gambino, Anderson .Paak, Pharrell Williams, and Jay-Z, among others.

Calmatic has also done extensive work in commercial direction, creating ads for Target, Sprite, and numerous other brands. His "All People Are Tax People" commercial for TurboTax premiered at the 2020 Super Bowl, and he received the Ad Age Director of the Year award the same year.

He directed the 2023 remake of the 1990 film House Party, developed by LeBron James, which was his feature-length debut. In 2023, he directed a reboot of the 1992 sports comedy film White Men Can't Jump for 20th Century Studios. The film, starring Sinqua Walls and rapper Jack Harlow in his acting debut, was released on May 19, 2023. He directed the music video for Kendrick Lamar's song "squabble up".
