= Doug McHenry =

American film director and producer (born 1952)

- Born: 1952 (age 73–74); Richmond, California, U.S.
- Education: Harvard Business School; Harvard Law School; Stanford University
- Occupations: Film director; film producer

Doug McHenry is an American film director and producer.

Doug McHenry was born in 1952 and grew up in Richmond, California. He graduated from Stanford University in 1973 with a degree in economics, and from Harvard Law School and Harvard Business School.

He worked for film producer Peter Guber at Casablanca Records as a business affairs executive then production executive, involved in films Thank God It's Friday (1978), The Hollywood Knights (1980) and Foxes (1980) before starting his own production company, Elephant Walk Entertainment, with partner George Jackson. Jackson and McHenry produced a number of films together including Krush Groove, New Jack City, Jason's Lyric, A Thin Line Between Love and Hate and the series of House Party films.

He directed Jason's Lyric starring Jada Pinkett Smith, Allen Payne, and Forest Whitaker.

On August 14, 2018, Doug McHenry's daughter, Lyric McHenry was found unconscious and unresponsive in New York City. She was taken to the hospital where she was pronounced dead. She was 26 years old and had featured regularly on EJNYC as well as producing the show. It is believed she was 20 weeks pregnant at the time of her death.
