= Tisha Campbell =

American actress and singer (born 1968)

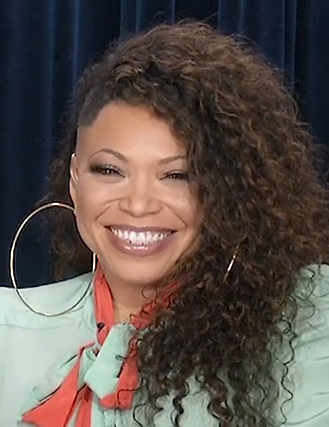
- Campbell in 2018
- Born: Tisha Michelle Campbell; October 13, 1968 (age 57); Oklahoma City, Oklahoma, U.S.
- Other name: Tisha Campbell-Martin
- Occupations: Actress; singer
- Years active: 1974–present
- Spouse: Duane Martin (m. 1996; div. 2020)
- Children: 2
- Musical career
- Origin: Newark, New Jersey, U.S.
- Genres: R&B; hip hop
- Instruments: Vocals
- Labels: Capitol; EMI

Tisha Michelle Campbell (born October 13, 1968) is an American actress and singer. She made her screen debut appearing in the 1986 rock musical comedy film Little Shop of Horrors, and later starred on the NBC musical comedy drama Rags to Riches (1987–1988). She has appeared in films including School Daze (1988), Rooftops (1989), Another 48 Hrs. (1990), Boomerang (1992), and Sprung (1997). She received a nomination for the Independent Spirit Award for Best Supporting Female for playing Sidney in the comedy film House Party (1990). She reprises the role of Sidney in the sequels House Party 2 (1991) and House Party 3 (1994).

Campbell starred as Gina Waters-Payne in the Fox comedy series Martin (1992–1997) and as Janet "Jay" Marie Johnson-Kyle in the ABC comedy series My Wife and Kids (2001–2005), winning the NAACP Image Award for Outstanding Actress in a Comedy Series for the latter. Her other television roles include Rita Rocks (Lifetime, 2008–2009), The Protector (Lifetime, 2011), Lemonade Mouth (Disney, 2011), Dr. Ken (ABC, 2015–2017), Outmatched (Fox, 2020) and Uncoupled (Netflix, 2022).

== Early life ==
Tisha Campbell was born in Oklahoma City, Oklahoma and raised in Newark, New Jersey. Campbell attended Newark Arts High School. The eldest of her parents' four children, Campbell grew up singing, encouraged by her family's love for music. Her mother, Hattie "Mona" Washington (née Raye; formerly Shockley and Campbell), was a nurse, talent manager, gospel singer, and vocal coach. Her father, Clifton Campbell, was a factory worker, singer, and chess master, who worked with underprivileged children. Through her father, Campbell has an older half-brother and two younger half-sisters. Campbell has said that she was raped at age three by a male family friend who was baby-sitting her at the time.

== Career ==
=== Acting ===
Campbell's first television appearance was at the age of six, in an episode in 1974 of the PBS show The Big Blue Marble. As a child, she won many talent shows, going on to appear in such children's programs as Kids Are People Too, Unicorn Tales (played lead Daisy Bunsen in episode, The Magnificent Major), and Captain Kangaroo. At age 17, she performed in the musical feature film, Little Shop of Horrors as Chiffon, one of The Supremes-like girl group Greek Chorus, along with future Martin co-star and best friend, Tichina Arnold.

After graduating from the Arts High School in Newark, she moved to Hollywood, where she became a star on the NBC musical comedy-drama series, Rags to Riches (1987–88). She later starred in the musical comedy drama film School Daze, directed by Spike Lee, as Jane Toussaint.

In 1989, Campbell costarred in the crime film Rooftops. The following year, she starred alongside Eddie Murphy in the action comedy Another 48 Hrs.. She later appeared in a supporting role in the 1992 romantic comedy Boomerang, also starring Murphy. Her most notable film credit is 1990 comedy House Party for which she received Independent Spirit Award for Best Supporting Female nomination. She later co starred in its two sequels; House Party 2 (1991), and House Party 3 (1994). In 1997, she received her star billed role in the Trimark Pictures' comedy film Sprung. She later had the leading role in the independent drama film The Last Place on Earth (2002), and appeared in Kevin Smith's sex comedy film Zack and Miri Make a Porno (2008) playing the acerbic wife of Craig Robinson's character.

In 1992, Campbell was cast as Gina Waters-Payne in the Fox comedy series Martin. She left the show in November 1996, returning to work after settling a lawsuit accusing co-star Martin Lawrence of sexual harassment. Campbell continued in the role until the series ended in 1997. The following year, she starred opposite Diahann Carroll in the Hallmark Hall of Fame film The Sweetest Gift (1998). Campbell returned to television in 2001, starring opposite Damon Wayans in the ABC comedy series My Wife and Kids. In 2003, she won NAACP Image Award for Outstanding Actress in a Comedy Series for her role. The series ran for five seasons, ending in 2005.

After My Wife and Kids, Campbell was a regular in the Lifetime comedy series Rita Rocks (2008–09). In 2011, she starred opposite Ally Walker in the Lifetime police drama The Protector. The series was canceled after a single season. Also in 2011, she starred in the acclaimed Disney Channel original film Lemonade Mouth. In September 2015, she was cast in the ABC sitcom Dr. Ken, starring Ken Jeong. The series was cancelled after two seasons in 2017. In the beginning of 2018, she played Olympic gymnast Simone Biles' mother in the Lifetime movie The Simone Biles Story: Courage to Soar. Later in 2018, Campbell starred on the ABC drama pilot The Holmes Sisters about the lives of five African-American sisters, all officers in the NYPD. It was produced by Regina King and Robin Roberts.

=== Music ===
In 1993, Campbell released her debut album, Tisha, which was a moderate success, selling 40,000 copies. Two singles received minor airplay on the R&B stations: "Push", which was produced by Derek Bramble, and "Love Me Down". Campbell contributed vocals for the soundtrack of the 1997 film, Sprung, in which she starred, singing a cover version of "Don't Ask My Neighbor" with Tichina Arnold.

She appeared in several music videos in the 1990s and 2000s, including two for Will Smith ("Will 2K" and "Wild Wild West") and one for Toni Braxton ("You're Makin' Me High"). In 2012, Campbell starred in Mindless Behavior's music video for "Hello".

On September 21, 2015, she released the single, "Steel Here". On February 24, 2016, Campbell released the single, "Lazy Bitch", as well as an accompanying video, where she featured her friend, Tasha Smith. On February 2, 2018, Campbell released the single, "I Don't Wanna Be Alone Tonight". On October 6, 2019, she released the single, "22 Summers," with an accompanying video.

=== Philanthropy ===
In 2011, Campbell co-founded Colored My Mind, a non-profit foundation dedicated to raising awareness of childhood autism in communities of color. She was inspired to start the organization by her son Xen, who was diagnosed with autism when he was 18 months old.

== Personal life ==
On August 17, 1996, Campbell married actor Duane Martin. Together, they have two sons. In February 2018, Campbell filed for divorce after 21 years of marriage. The couple finalized their divorce in December 2020.

In November 1996, Campbell left the Fox series Martin during its final season, citing "intolerable" working conditions. In January 1997, Campbell filed a lawsuit against co-star Martin Lawrence on the counts of sexual harassment and abuse both on and off set. By April 1997, Campbell had settled the lawsuit, and returned to appear in the last two episodes of the series. Campbell and Lawrence have both stated that they have since reconciled.

In 2026, Campbell disclosed that she had been diagnosed with autism and attention deficit hyperactivity disorder.

== Discography ==
Studio albums

- Tisha (1993)

== Filmography ==
=== Film ===
Year	Title	Role	Notes
1977	The Magnificent Major	Daisy Bunsen	Short
1980	The Me Nobody Knows	Lillie-Mae	TV movie
1986	Little Shop of Horrors	Chiffon	
1988	School Daze	Jane Toussaint	
1989	Rooftops	Amber	
1990	House Party	Sidney	
1990	Another 48 Hrs.	Amy Smith	
1991	House Party 2	Sidney	
1992	Boomerang	Yvonne	
1994	House Party 3	Sidney	
1996	Homeward Bound II: Lost in San Francisco	Sledge (voice)	
1996	Snitch	Steimer	
1997	Sprung	Brandy	
1998	The Sweetest Gift	Ruby Wilson	TV movie
2001	Down to Earth	Woman in Audience	
2002	The Last Place on Earth	Ann Field	
2008	Zack and Miri Make a Porno	Angelina	
2009	Pastor Brown	Amanda Carlton	
2010	Wright vs. Wrong	Sasha	TV movie
2011	Lemonade Mouth	Jenny Reznick	TV movie
2018	Blindspotting	Mama Liz	
2018	The Simone Biles Story: Courage to Soar	Nellie Biles	TV movie
2021	The J Team	Coach Poppy	
2023	Every Breath She Takes	Detective Charice Walker	TV movie
2024	Not Another Church Movie	Flora Black	
2025	Operation: Aunties	Sharon	
2026	Be Happy	Val	

=== Television ===
Year	Title	Role	Notes
1987–88	Rags to Riches	Marva Foley	Main Cast
1990	Shannon's Deal	Annette	Episode: "Inside Straight"
1991	A Different World	Josie Webb	Recurring Cast: Season 4
1991	The Fresh Prince of Bel Air	Kathleen	Episode: "Did the Earth Move for You?"
1991	Blossom	Toni	Recurring Cast: Season 2
1992	Roc	Angela Kimbro	Episode: "A Piece of the Roc"
1992–97	Martin	Gina Waters-Payne	Main Cast
1993	It's Showtime at the Apollo	Herself	Episode: "Episode #6.24"
1993	Soul Train	Herself	Episode: "Tisha Campbell/Lorenzo Smith/Young Black Teenagers"
1994	An Evening at the Improv	Herself/Host	Episode: "Episode #13.7"
1994–95	Soul Train	Herself/Guest Host	Guest Host: Season 23 & 25
1995	Happily Ever After: Fairy Tales for Every Child	Rapunzel (voice)	Episode: "Rapunzel"
1997	Duckman	Ebony Sable (voice)	Episode: "Ebony, Baby"
1997	Between Brothers	Daisy	Episode: "Dusty's in Love"
1998	Getting Personal	Michelle/Sandy	Episode: "Milo Does the Darndest Things"
1998	Cousin Skeeter	Herself (voice)	Episode: "A Family Thing"
1998–2000	Linc's	Rosalee Lincoln	Recurring Cast
1999	Intimate Portrait	Herself	Episode: "Pam Grier"
1999	Wasteland	Olivia	Episode: "The Object of My Affection"
2000	Happily Ever After: Fairy Tales for Every Child	Goldie (voice)	Episode: "The Steadfast Tin Soldier"
2000	Sabrina, the Teenage Witch	Joyce	Episode: "The Halloween Scene"
2001	Cousin Skeeter	Nicole (voice)	Recurring Cast: Season 3
2001–05	My Wife and Kids	Janet Marie "Jay" Kyle	Main Cast
2002	Intimate Portrait	Herself	Episode: "Tisha Campbell-Martin"
2003	Switched!	Herself	Episode: "Jennifer and Aubrey"
2003	Ripley's Believe It or Not!	Herself	Episode: "Season Premiere!"
2003	The Proud Family	Rene (voice)	Episode: "There's Something About Rene"
2004	The Sharon Osbourne Show	Herself/Guest Co-Host	Episode: "Feb 26, 2004"
2004	Punk'd	Herself	Episode: "Episode #3.2"
2004–06	All of Us	Carmen James	Guest: Season 1, Recurring Cast: Season 3-4
2007	E! True Hollywood Story	Herself	Episode: "Will Smith"
2008	The Game	Herself	Episode: "A Delectable Basket of Treats"
2008–09	Everybody Hates Chris	Juanita "Peaches" Clarkson	Recurring Cast: Season 4
2008–09	Rita Rocks	Patty Mannix	Main Cast
2010	Private Chefs of Beverly Hills	Herself	Episode: "Challah Back"
2011	The Talk	Herself/Guest Co-Host	Episode: "Episode #1.131"
2011	The Paul Reiser Show	Maggie	Episode: "The Old Guy"
2011	The Protector	Michelle Dulcett	Main Cast
2012	Tamar & Vince	Herself	Episode: "Are You Ready for Tamar?!?"
2012	Robot Chicken	Beyoncé Knowles (voice)	Episode: "Casablankman 2"
2012	Private Practice	Pam Reiter	Episode: "You Don't Know What You've Got Til It's Gone"
2013	NickMom Night Out	Herself	Episode: "Los Angeles Episode 6"
2013	Malibu Country	Rikki	Episode: "Bowling for Mama"
2013–16	Real Husbands of Hollywood	Herself	Guest: Season 1 & 4, Recurring Cast: Season 2-3
2014	The Daily Helpline	Herself/Co-Host	Episode: "Tisha Campbell-Martin I & II"
2015	Unsung Hollywood	Herself	Episode: "Vivica A. Fox"
2015	Unsung	Herself	Episode: "Kid 'n Play"
2015–17	Dr. Ken	Damona Watkins	Main Cast
2015–20	The Real	Herself/Guest Co-Host	Recurring Guest Co-Host: Season 2 & 6
2016	Kocktails with Khloé	Herself	Episode: "Khloé Kardashian Spills the Tea"
2016	FABLife	Herself/Guest Co-Host	Episode: "Episode #1.142"
2016	Hollywood Today Live	Herself/Guest Co-Host	Recurring Guest Co-Host
2016	The $100,000 Pyramid	Herself/Celebrity Player	Episode: "Episode #1.3"
2016–17	Legends of Chamberlain Heights	Additional Voices (voice)	Recurring Cast
2017–18	Hip Hop Squares	Herself	Guest Cast: Season 3-5
2018	Meet the Peetes	Herself	Episode: "The Guilt Trip"
2018	RuPaul's Drag Race	Herself/Guest Judge	Episode: "The Last Ball on Earth"
2018	Match Game	Herself	Episode: "Tisha Campbell-Martin/Adam Carolla/Mark Duplass"
2018	Long Island Medium	Herself	Episode: "Sitcom Spirits"
2018	Grey's Anatomy	Lila's Mom	Episode: "All of Me"
2018–19	Empire	Brooke	Recurring Cast: Season 3-4
2018–20	25 Words or Less	Herself/Contestant	Recurring Guest
2018–20	Craig of the Creek	Kim/Shatanya (voice)	Guest: Season 1 & 3, Recurring Cast: Season 2
2018–21	Soul Train Music Awards	Herself/Co-Host	Main Co-Host
2018–24	Uncensored	Herself	Recurring Guest
2019	The Bold and the Beautiful	Dr. Davis	Regular Cast
2019–20	Last Man Standing	Carol Larabee	Recurring Cast: Season 7-8
2019–25	Harley Quinn	Additional Voices (voice)	Recurring Cast: Season 1-4, Guest: Season 5
2020	Entertainment Tonight	Herself/Guest Co-Host	Episode: "Ben Affleck in Hollywood!"
2020	Outmatched	Rita	Main Cast
2021	Celebrity Family Feud	Herself/Celebrity Player	Episode: "Episode #8.7"
2021–22	Inside Job	Gigi Thompson (voice)	Main Cast
2022	Uncoupled	Suzanne Prentiss	Main Cast
2023	Name That Tune	Herself/Contestant	Episode: "Name That TV Star"
2023	See It Loud: The History of Black Television	Herself	Recurring Guest
2023	The $100,000 Pyramid	Herself/Celebrity Player	Episode: "Episode #6.5"
2023	Celebrity Squares	Herself	2 episodes
2023	Be Someone	Tanika Williams	Main Cast
2023	Act Your Age	Keisha	Main Cast
2023	Pantheon	Pasha (voice)	Episode: "Joey Coupet"
2024	Good Times: Black Again	Various Roles (voice)	Recurring Cast
2024	Lopez vs Lopez	Dr. Glenda Brenda	Episode: "Lopez Vs. George"
2024	Kite Man: Hell Yeah!	Tawny (voice)	Recurring Cast
2024	Everybody Still Hates Chris	Juanita "Peaches" Clarkson (voice)	Recurring Cast
2025	The Lowdown	Odette	Recurring Cast
2026	The Ms. Pat Show	Sheila Jackson	Recurring Cast: Season 5

=== Music videos ===
Year	Artist	Song	Role
1996	Toni Braxton	"You're Makin' Me High"	Friend
1999	Will Smith featuring K-Ci	"Will 2K"	Herself
2011	Mindless Behavior	"Hello"	Mother

=== Documentary ===
Year	Title
2011	Kiss and Tell: The History of Black Romance in Movie

== Awards and nominations ==
Year	Award	Category	Nominated work	Result
1991	Independent Spirit Award	"Best Supporting Female"	House Party	Nominated
1996	Image Award	"Outstanding Lead Actress in a Comedy Series"	Martin	Nominated
1997	Image Award	"Outstanding Lead Actress in a Comedy Series"	Martin	Nominated
2002	Image Award	"Outstanding Actress in a Comedy Series"	My Wife and Kids	Nominated
2003	Image Award	"Outstanding Actress in a Comedy Series"	My Wife and Kids	Won
2004	Image Award	"Outstanding Actress in a Comedy Series"	My Wife and Kids	Nominated
2004	BET Comedy Award	"Outstanding Lead Actress in a Comedy Series"	My Wife and Kids	Won
2005	Image Award	"Outstanding Actress in a Comedy Series"	My Wife and Kids	Nominated
2005	BET Comedy Award	"Outstanding Directing for a Comedy Series" Shared with: Various	My Wife and Kids	Nominated
2009	Image Award	"Outstanding Supporting Actress in a Comedy Series"	Rita Rocks	Nominated
2010	Image Award	"Outstanding Supporting Actress in a Comedy Series"	Rita Rocks	Nominated
