= George Jackson (filmmaker) =

American film director

- Born: January 6, 1958; Harlem, New York, U.S.
- Died: February 10, 2000 (aged 42)
- Occupations: director, producer
- Years active: 1985–2000
- Spouse: Yuko Sumida 1998–2000 (his death)

George Jackson (January 6, 1958 – February 10, 2000) was a film director and producer. Jackson was born and raised in Harlem, New York and graduated from Fordham Preparatory School and Harvard College. He worked with Doug McHenry as producer on such projects as Krush Groove, Jason's Lyric, New Jack City, and Body Count in which he made a cameo appearance as a ticket clerk. With McHenry, Jackson directed the second installment of the House Party series. Subsequently he was President of Motown Records and founded an internet-based media company, Urban Box Office, with Adam Kidron and Frank Cooper.

Jackson died of a stroke in 2000. The George Jackson Academy in New York City was founded in his memory.
