= House Party 3 =

1994 American comedy film

- Canadian theatrical release poster
- Directed by: Eric Meza
- Screenplay by: Takashi Bufford
- Story by: David Toney; Takashi Bufford
- Based on: Characters by Reginald Hudlin
- Produced by: Carl Craig
- Starring: Kid 'n Play; Bernie Mac; Gilbert Gottfried; TLC; Angela Means; Immature; Michael Colyar; Tisha Campbell
- Cinematography: Anghel Decca
- Edited by: Tom Walls
- Music by: David Allen Jones
- Production company: New Line Cinema
- Distributed by: New Line Cinema
- Release date: January 12, 1994
- Running time: 100 minutes
- Country: United States
- Language: English
- Box office: $19 million

House Party 3 is a 1994 American comedy film, directed by Eric Meza and written by Takashi Bufford. It stars Kid 'n Play, Bernie Mac, Gilbert Gottfried, TLC, Angela Means, Immature and Michael Colyar, with a special appearance by Tisha Campbell, and Chris Tucker in his film debut. It is the third in the House Party film series and was intended to be the final film in the series, but a direct to video sequel, House Party 4: Down to the Last Minute, was released seven years later.

== Plot ==
Christopher, a.k.a. Kid, is marrying his girlfriend Veda Pratt, while his best friend Peter, a.k.a. Play, is dipping his fingers into the music business and attempting to manage a roughneck female rap act called Sex as a Weapon. Play books the ladies for a concert with heavy-hitting promoter Showboat, but when they decide to fire Play and hire a new manager, he has to figure out how to deliver them to the show or face the wrath of Showboat's female security force.

Things eventually begin to spiral out of control for the two, as Play is also planning the bachelor party while trying to keep Kid's three younger cousins from Detroit (who ironically call themselves Immature) in line, and Kid's ex-girlfriend Sydney has come back to town, which is news that doesn't please Veda at all. To complicate matters more Kid's cousins hijack his bachelor party in retaliation for not letting them perform at it (moving it from the rented hotel ballroom to their Aunt Lucy's house). The party at the ballroom is a bust as Play's cousin Stinky invites very obese women to the party (he's attracted to heavyset women). Meanwhile, Showboat has been out looking for Kid & Play for his money, but gets sidetracked briefly by Kid's mischievous cousins.

Embarrassed by the poor turnout at his party, Kid bails into the corridor and runs into Sydney (who is there for her grandparents' anniversary party). Sydney congratulates Kid and tells him that Veda is good for him. As they hug and part ways, Veda comes out of the elevator and sees them hugging. She immediately jumps to the conclusion that Kid slept with her only for her Cousin Janelle (who had been dogging Kid and the pending marriage throughout the film) to come to his defense and tell Veda she is wrong to assume Kid cheated. At the same time, Play (who also disagreed with Kid getting married) tells Kid he is wrong for wanting to break off the marriage, since he's convinced Veda doesn't trust him.

After Kid and Veda make up, they get a phone call from his Uncle Vester about the party Immature is throwing and head back to his Aunt Lucy's house to find an out of control party in progress (unbeknownst to Aunt Lucy who was up in her room). Just as Kid starts to curse his cousins out, Play stops him and convinces him to celebrate his bachelor party here. At that moment, Showboat arrives with his female hitmen and are about to attack Kid & Play when he hears Kid's cousins performing at the party. Kid picks up on this and immediately informs Showboat that they were a new act he and Play were working on. Sex as a Weapon arrives and tells Showboat that they didn't like what was done to the three blind rappers earlier in the film (they were stiffed on the pay for a show), so they opted to come back to Kid & Play, giving Showboat two new acts instead of just one.

Showboat pays up and everything is seemingly coming back into their control. Even Immature knows how much of an irritation they were, so in that resolve, they opt to give Kid half of the cash from the party. This cash, however, is taken by Aunt Lucy, who revealed that she knew all along that there was a party going on and that the money would be just enough to clean her house after it was over. After the drama has settled, Kid & Play enjoy the party and perform one last time together rapping to the crowd along with Sex as A Weapon.

The next day, Kid and Veda finally tie the knot. Play gifts Kid with a brand new Jeep, telling him that their production company is going to be huge. He accepts the Jeep as he and Veda ride off into the sunset.

== Cast ==
- Christopher "Kid" Reid as Christopher "Kid" Robinson, Jr.
- Christopher "Play" Martin as Peter "Play" Martin
- Angela Means as Veda Pratt
- Khandi Alexander as Janelle
- Bernie Mac as Sylvester "Uncle Vester" Robinson
- Marques Houston of Immature as Marques "Batman" Houston
- Jerome "Young Rome" Jones of Immature as Jerome "Romeo" Jones
- Don Santos of Immature as Don "Half-Pint" Santos
- Michael Colyar as Showboat
- Tisha Campbell as Sydney
- David Edwards as James "Stinky" Martin
- Ketty Lester as Aunt Lucy
- Freez Luv as Caterer
- Anthony Johnson as Butcher
- TLC as Sex as a Weapon
- Gilbert Gottfried as Luggage Clerk
- Chris Tucker as Johnny Booze
- Reynaldo Rey as Mr. Pratt
- Simply Marvalous as Mrs. Pratt
- Shireen Crutchfield as Shireen
- Chuckii Booker as a piano player in the hotel lobby band

== Music ==
A soundtrack containing hip hop and R&B music was released in January 1994 by Select Records. It peaked at 55 on the Top R&B/Hip-Hop Albums. The soundtrack is notable for containing the last original material released by the film's stars, Kid 'n Play.

== Reception ==
=== Box office ===
The film opened on Wednesday, January 12, 1994 in 848 theaters and despite the poor reviews and low expectations, finished third at the US box office over the Martin Luther King Jr. Day weekend with a 4-day weekend gross of $6,850,010, exceeding the openings of the first two films. It went on to gross $19,281,235 in the United States and Canada

=== Critical response ===
The film had lackluster reviews. Rotten Tomatoes gives the film 0% score based on reviews from 10 critics.

=== Year-end lists ===
- Dishonorable mention – Dan Craft, The Pantagraph

== Sequels ==
In 2001 House Party 4: Down to the Last Minute was released direct to video, however it serves as a standalone sequel as no characters, cast and crew members from the previous installments were in the film. 12 years later in 2013, a fifth installment in the series, titled House Party: Tonight's the Night, was released by Warner Premiere in 2013 and serves as a direct sequel to House Party 3, unrelated to the events of House Party 4 and features the return of Kid 'n Play, reprising their roles from the first three films.
