= Roxanne Shante discography =

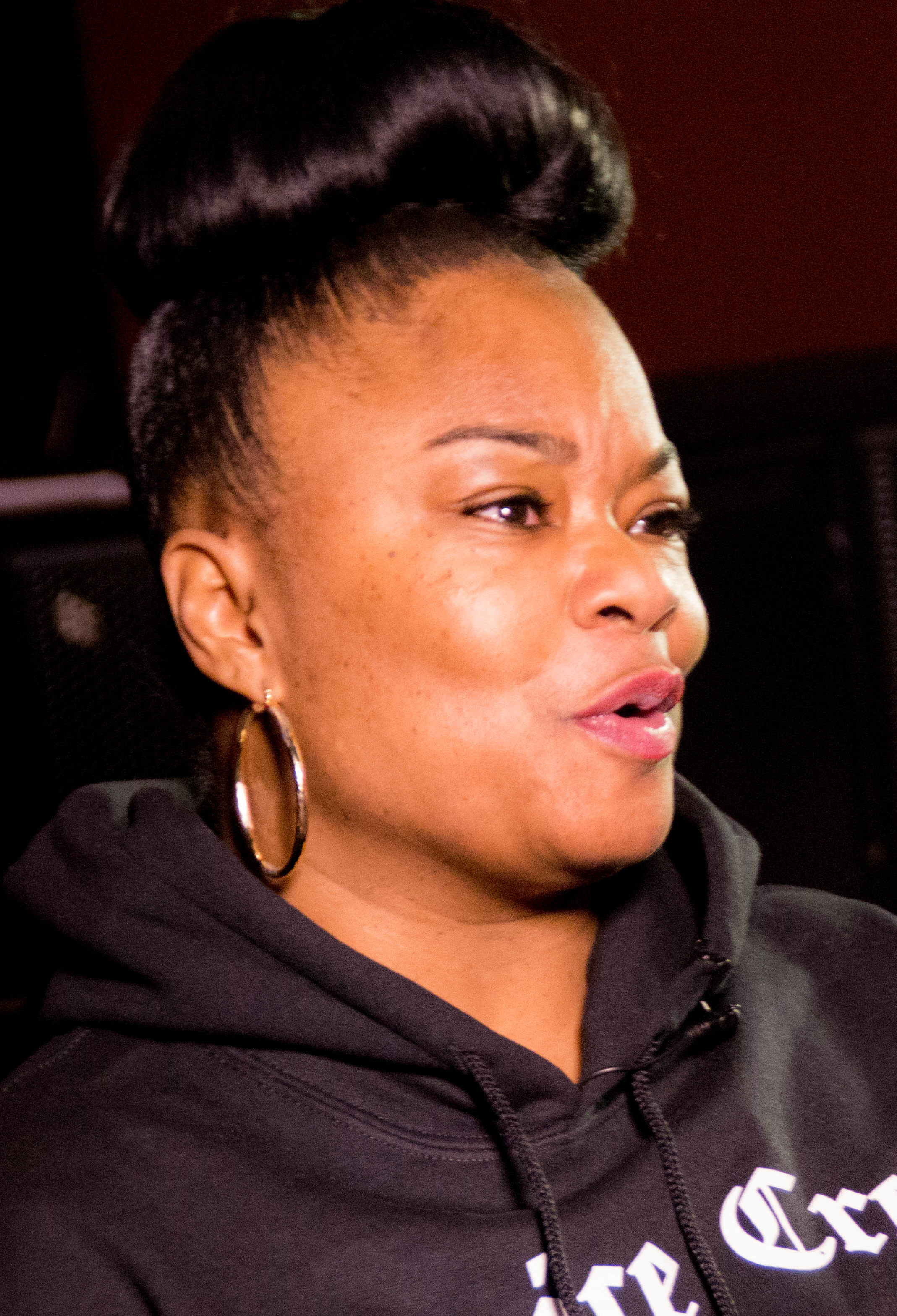
- Studio albums: 2
- EPs: 2
- Compilation albums: 3
- Singles: 29
- Music videos: 42
- Promotional singles: 2

The following is the discography of Roxanne Shante, an American rapper.

== Albums ==
=== Studio albums ===
List of albums, with selected chart positions
Title	Album details	Peak chart positions
Title	Album details	US R&B /HH
Bad Sister	Released: October 20, 1989; Label: Cold Chillin'/Reprise/Warner Bros.; Formats: CD, LP, Cassette, digital download	52
The Bitch Is Back	Released: October 5, 1992; Label: Livin' Large/Tommy Boy/Warner Bros.; Formats: CD, LP, Cassette	—
"—" denotes a recording that did not chart or was not released in that territory.

=== Compilation albums ===
List of compilation albums
Title	Album details	Peak chart positions
Title	Album details	US R&B /HH
Def Mix Vol. 1	Released: October, 1985; Label: Pop Art Records; Formats: LP, Cassette	61
Greatest Hits	Released: September 12, 1995; Label: Cold Chillin'; Formats: CD, LP, Cassette	—
The Best Of Cold Chillin': Roxanne Shante	Released: October 9, 2001; Label: Landspeed Records; Formats: CD, LP	—
"—" denotes a recording that did not chart or was not released in that territory.

== EPs ==
List of extended plays
Title	Details	Track listings
Round 1 (with Sparky Dee)	Released: 1985; Label: Spin Records; Formats: LP, Cassette	Track listing: 1. "Roxanne's Revenge"; 2. "Sparky's Turn (Roxanne, You're Through)"; 3. "Round 1 (Censored)"; 4. "Sparky's Profile"; 5. "Roxanne's Profile"; 6. "Round 1 (Uncensored)"
Thin Line	Released: 1996; Label: Salmon Records; Formats: LP (Limited Edition)	Track listing: 1. "Thin Line (Reality Mix)"; 2. "Thin Line (Marley's Radio Mix)"; 3. "Thin Line (Player Mix)"; 4. "Thin Line (Player Mix Instrumental)"; 5. "It Can't Happen"; 6. "Good Time"; 7. "Polo's Symphony"

== Singles ==
=== As lead artist ===
List of singles, with selected chart positions
Title	Year	Chart positions			Album
Title	Year	US Bub.	US R&B	UK	Album
"Roxanne's Revenge"	1984	9	22	—	Round 1
"Queen of Rox (Shanté Rox On)"	1985	—	49	—	Def Mix Vol. 1
"Bite This"	1985	—	84	97	Def Mix Vol. 1
"Runaway"	1985	—	—	—	Def Mix Vol. 1
"The Def Fresh Crew"	1986	—	—	—	Street Sounds Hip Hop Electro 11
"I'm Fly Shanté" (featuring Steady B) (Note: Published as "Roxanne (Fly) Shanté")	1986	—	—	—	Non-album single
"Pay Back"	1987	—	—	—	NY-Philly Rap Connection
"Have a Nice Day"	1987	—	—	58	Bad Sister
"Go on, Girl"	1988	—	—	55	Colors (soundtrack) / Bad Sister
"Live on Stage"	1989	—	—	82	Bad Sister
"Independent Woman"	1990	—	—	77	Bad Sister
"Go on, Girl (Remix)"	1990	—	—	74	Bad Sister
"Big Mama"	1992	—	—	—	The Bitch Is Back
"Dance to This"	1992	—	—	—	The Bitch Is Back
"Queen Pin"	1996	—	—	—	Greatest Hits
"Reels" (with Bob Sinclar)	2022	—	—	—	Non-album single
"—" denotes a recording that did not chart or was not released in that territory.

=== Featured singles ===
List of featured singles, with selected chart positions
Title	Year	Chart positions									Album
Title	Year	US Bub.	US Dance	US R&B	US Rap	NLD	UK	UK Dance	UK R&B	UK Ind.	Album
"Sharp as a Knife (Acid Attack)" (Brandon Cooke featuring Roxanne Shante)	1986	—	—	—	*	—	45	—	*	—	Acieed Inferno Volume 2
"Loosey's Rap" (Rick James featuring Roxanne Shante)	1988	—	25	1	*	28	80	—	*	—	Wonderful
"The Cypher: Part III" (Frankie Cutlass featuring Big Daddy Kane, Biz Markie, Roxanne Shante & Craig G)	1997	22	— (Note: "The Cypher: Part III" did not enter the Dance Club Songs, but peaked at number 24 on the Hot Dance Music/Maxi-Singles Sales.)	70	24	—	59	9	12	—	Politics & Bullshit
"What's Goin' On?" (Mekon featuring Roxanne Shante)	2000	—	—	—	—	90	43	9	—	5	Relax with... Mekon
"Yes Yes Y'all" (Mekon featuring Roxanne Shante)	2006	—	—	—	—	—	—	—	—	39	Some Thing Came Up
"Make Me Sweat" (Basement Jaxx featuring Roxanne Shante)	2007	—	—	—	—	—	— (Note: "Make Me Sweat" did not enter the UK Singles Chart, but peaked at number 85 on the UK Physical Singles Chart.)	—	—	18	Non-album singles
"Plastic on Acid" (GotSome featuring Roxanne Shante)	2019	—	—	—	—	—	—	—	—	—	Non-album singles
"I Remember" (Y.P.F. featuring Roxanne Shante & $uly)	2021	—	—	—	—	—	—	—	—	—	Non-album singles
"—" denotes a recording that did not chart or was not released in that territory. "*" indicates a chart that did not exist at the time.

=== Promotional singles ===
List of promotional singles, showing year released and album name
Title	Year	Album
"Brothers Ain't Shit (Album Version)"	1990	The Bitch Is Back
"Straight Razor"	1992	The Bitch Is Back

== Guest appearances ==
List of non-single guest appearances, with other performing artists, showing year released and album name
Title	Year	Other performer(s)	Album
"Juice Crew All Stars"	1987	Craig G, Glamorous, Kool G Rap, MC Percy, MC Shan	Evolution (single)
"Wack Itt"	1988	Marley Marl	In Control, Volume 1
"Skeezer"	1989	—N/a	Lean on Me (soundtrack)
"Thin Line"	1996	—N/a	Girls Town (soundtrack)
"Have a Good Time"	1998	DJ Polo	Polo's Playhouse
"Down Like That"	1998	DJ Polo, Back II Back, Kasia	Polo's Playhouse
"What's Going On? (Jon Carter Mix)"	2000	Mekon	Astralwerks and Revolution Present LRD
"We Live This"	2000	Big Noyd, Havoc	Nas & Ill Will Records Presents QB's Finest
"Lollipop"	2006	Basement Jaxx, En Kryption	Take Me Back to Your House (single)
"Sometimes"	2013	Trinity, Eternia, Everlast, Grand Puba, Ill Bill, Immortal Technique, D-Stroy, Reef the Lost Cauze, Roc Marciano, Sha Stimuli, Slug	20 In
"Bite This 2012"	2013	Trinity	20 In
"Weekend Star"	2013	Ralph Myerz, George Clinton, Da Youngfellaz, K-Quick	SuperSonic Pulse
"Roxanne Roxanne (The New Chapter)"	2014	Full Force, Lou$tar, UTFO	With Love from Our Friends
"1989 (Just Like Old Times)"	2016	—N/a	Trois souvenirs de ma jeunesse (soundtrack)

=== Soundtrack television and film appearances ===
- Colors (1988)
- Lean on Me (1989)
- Girls Town (1996)
- Sisters in the Name of Rap (1992)
- Roxanne Roxanne (Executive Producer) (2017)

=== Sampling ===
- Have a Nice Day – Hot Pants Road, The JB's
- Knocking Hiney – Theme from Shaft, Isaac Hayes
- My Groove Gets Better – Think, Lyn Collins
- Skeezer – Games People Play, Sweet G
