= List of British films of 2021 =

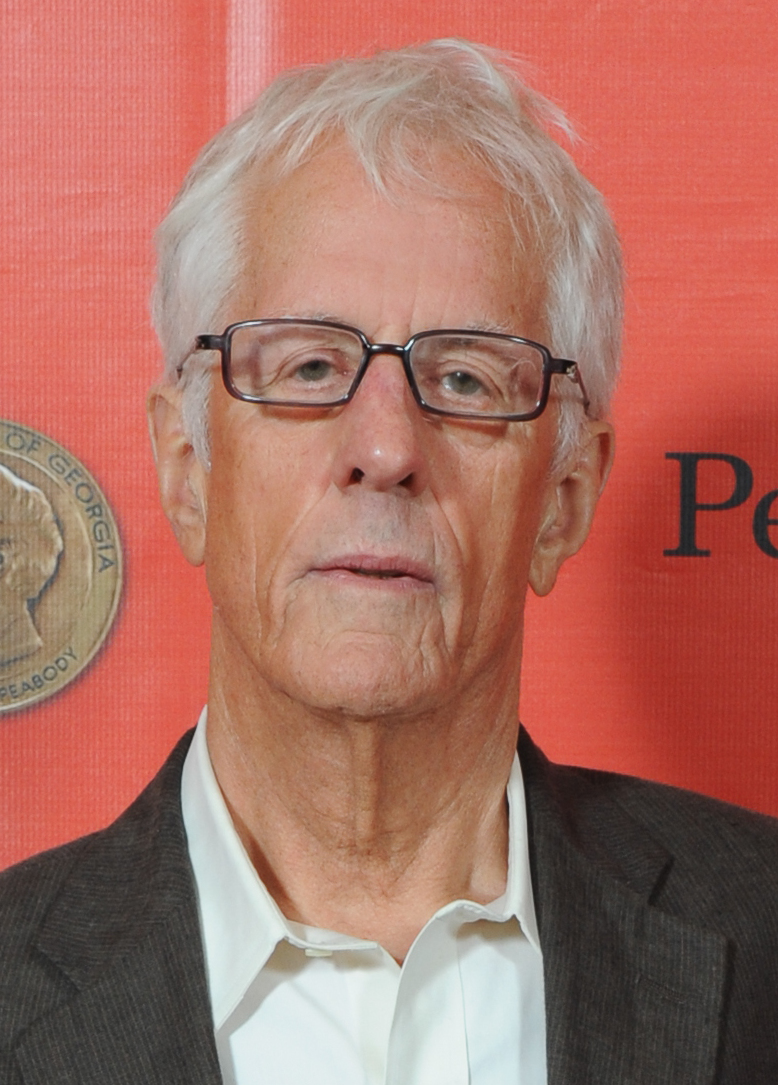
2021 saw the death of director Michael Apted.

This article lists feature-length British films and full-length documentaries that have their premiere in 2021 and were at least partly produced by the United Kingdom. It does not feature short films, medium-length films, made-for-TV films, pornographic films, filmed theater, VR films or interactive films, nor does it include films screened in previous years that had official release dates in 2021.

== British films box office ==
The highest-grossing independent British films released in 2021 according to the British Film Institute, by domestic box office gross revenue, are as follows:

Highest-grossing U.K. independent films of 2021
Rank	Title	Distributor	Domestic gross
1	The French Dispatch	Disney	£4,100,000
2	The Hitman's Wife's Bodyguard*	Lionsgate	£3,800,000
3	Spencer	STX Entertainment	£2,800,000
4	People Just Do Nothing: Big In Japan	Universal	£2,346,614
5	Last Night in Soho*	Universal	£2,337,418
6	The Father	Lionsgate	£2,101,732
7	The Courier	Lionsgate	£2,000,000
8	A Boy Called Christmas	Sky Cinema	£800,000
9	Supernova	StudioCanal	£800,000
10	The Last Letter from Your Lover	StudioCanal	£800,000

== Film premieres ==
=== January–March ===
Opening		Title	Cast and crew	Details	Ref.
J A N U A R Y	14	Locked Down	Director: Doug Liman; Cast: Anne Hathaway, Chiwetel Ejiofor, Stephen Merchant, Mindy Kaling, Lucy Boynton, Mark Gatiss, Claes Bang, Ben Stiller, Ben Kingsley	Warner Bros. Pictures (co-produced by the United States)	
J A N U A R Y	15	The Dig	Director: Simon Stone; Cast: Carey Mulligan, Ralph Fiennes, Lily James, Johnny Flynn, Ben Chaplin, Ken Stott, Archie Barnes, Monica Dolan	Netflix; Based on The Dig by John Preston (co-produced by the United States)	
J A N U A R Y	28	Censor	Director: Prano Bailey-Bond; Cast: Niamh Algar, Nicholas Burns, Vincent Franklin, Sophia La Porta, Adrian Schiller, Michael Smiley		
J A N U A R Y	28	Flee	Director: Jonas Poher Rasmussen; Cast:Amin Nawabi, Daniel Karimyar, Fardin Mijdzadeh	Curzon Artificial Eye (co-produced by France, Sweden, Norway, Denmark and the United States)	
J A N U A R Y	29	In the Earth	Director: Ben Wheatley; Cast: Joel Fry, Reece Shearsmith, Hayley Squires, Ellora Torchia, John Hollingworth, Mark Monero	Universal Pictures (co-produced by the United States)	
J A N U A R Y	29	Twist	Director: Martin Owen; Cast: Rafferty Law, Michael Caine, Lena Headey, Rita Ora, Sophie Simnett, Noel Clarke, David Walliams, Franz Drameh, Jason Maza	Sky Cinema; Loosely based on Oliver Twist by Charles Dickens	
J A N U A R Y	30	Passing	Director: Rebecca Hall; Cast: Tessa Thompson, Ruth Negga, André Holland, Alexander Skarsgård, Bill Camp	Netflix; Based on Passing by Nella Larsen (co-produced by the United States)	
J A N U A R Y	30	The Sparks Brothers	Director: Edgar Wright; Cast: Ron Mael, Russell Mael, "Weird Al" Yankovic, Beck, Flea, Jonathan Ross, Patton Oswalt, Scott Aukerman, Jason Schwartzman, Tony Visconti, Mike Myers	Universal Pictures; Documentary about the band Sparks (co-produced by the United States)	
J A N U A R Y	31	Misha and the Wolves	Director: Sam Hobkinson	Netflix; About Misha Defonseca's fraudulent Holocaust memoir (co-produced by Belgium)	
F E B R U A R Y	12	The Mauritanian	Director: Kevin Macdonald; Cast: Jodie Foster, Tahar Rahim, Shailene Woodley, Benedict Cumberbatch	Based on Guantanamo Diary by Mohamedou Ould Salahi; STXfilms (co-produced by the United States)	
F E B R U A R Y	19	To Olivia	Director: John Hay; Cast: Hugh Bonneville, Keeley Hawes, Sam Heughan	Based on An Unquiet Life by Stephen Michael Shearer; Sky Cinema	
F E B R U A R Y	24	Creation Stories	Director: Nick Moran; Cast: Ewen Bremner, Suki Waterhouse, Jason Flemyng, Thomas Turgoose, Jason Isaacs	About Alan McGee and Creation Records; Sky Cinema (co-produced by the United States)	
F E B R U A R Y	27	Poly Styrene: I Am a Cliché	Director: Nick Moran; Cast: Ruth Negga, Jonathan Ross, Kathleen Hanna, Neneh Cherry, Thurston Moore, Vivienne Westwood	Modern Films; About Poly Styrene	
M A R C H	1	The Beta Test	Directors: Jim Cummings, PJ McCabe; Cast: Jim Cummings, PJ McCabe, Virginia Newcomb, Jessie Barr	(co-produced with the United States)	
M A R C H	6	Sir Alex Ferguson: Never Give In	Director: Jason Ferguson; Cast: Alex Ferguson	About Sir Alex Ferguson	
M A R C H	17	The Feast	Director: Lee Haven Jones; Cast: Annes Elwy, Nia Roberts, Julian Lewis Jones	Picturehouse Entertainment	
M A R C H	17	Here Before	Director: Stacey Gregg; Cast: Andrea Riseborough, Jonjo O'Neill, Martin McCann, Eileen O'Higgins		
M A R C H	20	Granada Nights	Director: Abid Khan; Cast: Antonio Aakeel, Quintessa Swindell, Óscar Casas, Julius Fleischanderl, Laura Frederico, Isabel Guardiola, Leticia Marín, Virgile Bramly		

=== April–June ===
Opening		Title	Cast and crew	Details	Ref.
A P R I L	22	Wrath of Man	Director: Guy Ritchie; Cast: Jason Statham, Holt McCallany, Jeffrey Donovan, Josh Hartnett, Laz Alonso	Lionsgate; Loosely based on Cash Truck by Nicolas Boukhrief (co-produced by the United States)	
A P R I L	28	Voyagers	Director: Neil Burger; Cast: Tye Sheridan, Lily-Rose Depp, Fionn Whitehead, Colin Farrell, Chanté Adams, Isaac Hempstead Wright	Lionsgate (co-produced by Czech Republic, Romania and the United States)	
M A Y	21	Seance	Director: Simon Barrett; Cast: Suki Waterhouse, Madisen Beaty, Ella-Rae Smith, Inanna Sarkis	RLJE Films	
M A Y	28	Riverdance: The Animated Adventure	Director: Dave Rosenbaum, Eamonn Butler; Cast: Pierce Brosnan, Aisling Bea, Brendan Gleeson, Pauline McLynn, John Kavanagh, Lilly Singh	Sky Cinema	
J U N E	4	Edge of the World	Director: Michael Haussman; Cast: Jonathan Rhys Meyers, Dominic Monaghan, Ralph Ineson, Samo Rafael, Hannah New, Josie Ho, Bront Palarae	Based on the adventures of James Brooke (co-produced by the United States, Malaysia and China)	
J U N E	12	Everybody's Talking About Jamie	Director: Jonathan Butterell; Cast: Max Harwood, Sarah Lancashire, Lauren Patel, Shobna Gulati, Ralph Ineson, Adeel Akhtar, Samuel Bottomley, Sharon Horgan, Richard E. Grant	Amazon Studios; Based on: Everybody's Talking About Jamie by Dan Gillespie Sells and Tom MacRae (co-produced by the United States)	
J U N E	18	The Last Bus	Director: Gillies MacKinnon; Cast: Timothy Spall, Phyllis Logan	Parkland Entertainment	
J U N E	18	Settlers	Director: Wyatt Rockefeller; Cast: Sofia Boutella, Ismael Cruz Córdova, Brooklynn Prince, Nell Tiger Free, Jonny Lee Miller	Vertigo Releasing	

=== July–September ===
Opening		Title	Cast and crew	Details	Ref.
J U L Y	5	Boiling Point	Director: Philip Barantini; Cast: Stephen Graham, Vinette Robinson, Alice Feetham, Hannah Walters	Vertigo Films	
J U L Y	8	The Souvenir Part II	Director: Joanna Hogg; Cast: Honor Swinton Byrne, Tilda Swinton, Richard Ayoade, Jaygann Ayeh, Ariane Labed, James Spencer Ashworth, Harris Dickinson, Charlie Heaton, Joe Alwyn	Picturehouse Entertainment (co-produced in Ireland and the United States)	
J U L Y	8	Cow	Director: Andrea Arnold	Mubi; Documentary about two cows	
J U L Y	9	Mothering Sunday	Director: Eva Husson; Cast: Odessa Young, Josh O'Connor, Olivia Colman, Colin Firth	Lionsgate UK; Based on Mothering Sunday by Graham Swift (co-produced in Ireland and the United States)	
J U L Y	11	Ali & Ava	Director: Clio Barnard; Cast: Adeel Akhtar, Claire Rushbrook	Altitude Film Distribution	
J U L Y	15	Memoria	Director: Apichatpong Weerasethakul; Cast: Tilda Swinton, Elkin Díaz, Jeanne Balibar, Juan Pablo Urrego, Daniel Giménez Cacho	Sovereign Films	
J U L Y	23	The Last Letter from Your Lover	Director: Augustine Frizzell; Cast: Felicity Jones, Callum Turner, Joe Alwyn, Nabhaan Rizwan, Shailene Woodley	Based on The Last Letter from Your Lover by Jojo Moyes; StudioCanal	
J U L Y	23	Off the Rails	Director: Jules Williamson; Cast: Kelly Preston, Jenny Seagrove, Sally Phillips, Franco Nero	Screen Media Films	
A U G U S T	6	Bull	Director: Paul Andrew Williams; Cast: Neil Maskell, David Hayman, Tamzin Outhwaite, Lois Brabin-Platt	Signature Entertainment	
A U G U S T	18	People Just Do Nothing: Big in Japan	Director: Jack Clough; Cast: Allan Mustafa, Asim Chaudhry, Steve Stamp, Dan Sylvester, Hugo Chegwin	BBC Film	
A U G U S T	27	The Pebble and the Boy	Director: Chris Green; Cast: Patsy Kensit, Ricci Harnett, Jesse Birdsall, Brian Croucher		
S E P T E M B E R	2	The Electrical Life of Louis Wain	Director: Will Sharpe; Cast: Benedict Cumberbatch, Claire Foy, Andrea Riseborough, Toby Jones	StudioCanal; Based on the life of Louis Wain (co-produced in United States)	
S E P T E M B E R	2	The Rescue	Director: Elizabeth Chai Vasarhelyi	Greenwich Entertainment; About Tham Luang cave rescue (co-produced in United States)	
S E P T E M B E R	2	The Power of the Dog	Director: Jane Campion; Cast: Benedict Cumberbatch, Kirsten Dunst, Jesse Plemons, Kodi Smit-McPhee, Thomasin McKenzie, Genevieve Lemon, Keith Carradine, Frances Conroy	Netflix; Based on: The Power of the Dog by Thomas Savage (co-produced in Australia, Canada, New Zealand and the United States)	
S E P T E M B E R	2	Belfast	Director: Kenneth Branagh; Cast: Caitriona Balfe, Judi Dench, Jamie Dornan, Ciarán Hinds, Colin Morgan, Jude Hill	Universal Pictures (co-produced in Ireland)	
S E P T E M B E R	2	Cyrano	Director: Joe Wright; Cast: Peter Dinklage, Haley Bennett, Kelvin Harrison Jr., Bashir Salahuddin, Ben Mendelsohn	Universal Pictures; Based on: Cyrano (2018 stage musical) by Erica Schmidt and Cyrano de Bergerac (1897 play) by Edmond Rostand (co-produced in Canada and the United States)	
S E P T E M B E R	3	Spencer	Director: Pablo Larraín; Cast: Kristen Stewart, Timothy Spall, Jack Farthing, Sean Harris, Sally Hawkins	STXfilms (co-produced in the United States, Germany and Chile)	
S E P T E M B E R	3	Cinderella	Director: Kay Cannon; Cast: Camila Cabello, Idina Menzel, Minnie Driver, Nicholas Galitzine, Billy Porter, Pierce Brosnan	Amazon Studios; Based on Cinderella by Charles Perrault (co-produced in the United States)	
S E P T E M B E R	3	Encounter	Director: Michael Pearce; Cast: Riz Ahmed, Octavia Spencer, Janina Gavankar, Rory Cochrane, Lucain-River Chauhan	Amazon Studios (co-produced in the United States)	
S E P T E M B E R	4	Last Night in Soho	Director: Edgar Wright; Cast: Thomasin McKenzie, Anya Taylor-Joy, Matt Smith, Michael Ajao, Terence Stamp, Diana Rigg	Universal Pictures	
S E P T E M B E R	4	True Things	Director: Harry Wootliff; Cast: Ruth Wilson, Tom Burke, Hayley Squires, Elizabeth Rider	Picturehouse Cinemas; Based on True Things About Me by Deborah Kay Davies	
S E P T E M B E R	10	Earwig	Director: Lucile Hadžihalilović; Cast: Paul Hilton, Romane Hemelaers, Romola Garai, Alex Lawther	Anti-Worlds; Based on Earwig by Brian Catling	
S E P T E M B E R	10	The Last Duel	Director: Ridley Scott; Cast: Matt Damon, Adam Driver, Jodie Comer, Ben Affleck, Harriet Walter, Alex Lawther, Marton Csokas	20th Century Studios; Based on The Last Duel: A True Story of Trial by Combat in Medieval France by Eric Jager (co-produced in the United States)	
S E P T E M B E R	12	Benediction	Director: Terence Davies; Cast: Jack Lowden, Peter Capaldi, Simon Russell Beale, Jeremy Irvine, Kate Phillips, Gemma Jones, Ben Daniels	Vertigo Films; Based on the life of Siegfried Sassoon (co-produced in the United States)	
S E P T E M B E R	12	Nobody Has to Know	Director: Bouli Lanners; Cast: Michelle Fairley, Bouli Lanners, Cal MacAninch	Parkland Entertainment (co-produced by France and Belgium)	
S E P T E M B E R	13	Dashcam	Director: Rob Savage; Cast: Annie Hardy	(co-produced in the United States)	
S E P T E M B E R	16	Silent Night	Director: Camille Griffin; Cast: Keira Knightley, Matthew Goode, Roman Griffin Davis, Annabelle Wallis, Lily-Rose Depp, Sope Dirisu, Kirby Howell-Baptiste, Lucy Punch, Rufus Jones	Altitude Film Distribution (co-produced in the United States)	
S E P T E M B E R	28	No Time to Die	Director: Cary Joji Fukunaga; Cast: Daniel Craig, Rami Malek, Léa Seydoux, Lashana Lynch, Ben Whishaw, Naomie Harris, Jeffrey Wright, Christoph Waltz, Ralph Fiennes	Universal Pictures; Based on James Bond by Ian Fleming (co-produced in the United States)	

=== October–December ===
Opening		Title	Cast and crew	Details	Ref.
O C T O B E R	9	Ron's Gone Wrong	Directors: Sarah Smith and Jean-Philippe Vine; Cast: Zach Galifianakis, Jack Dylan Grazer, Ed Helms, Justice Smith, Rob Delaney, Kylie Cantrall, Ricardo Hurtado and Olivia Colman	20th Century Studios (co-produced in the United States)	
O C T O B E R	11	All Is Vanity	Director: Marcos Mereles; Cast: Sid Phoenix, Yaseen Aroussi, Isabelle Bonfrer, Rosie Steel, Christopher Sherwood	Verve Pictures	
O C T O B E R	12	The Phantom of the Open	Director: Craig Roberts; Cast: Mark Rylance, Sally Hawkins, Rhys Ifans, Jake Davies, Christian Lees, Jonah Lees, Mark Lewis Jones	Entertainment One	
O C T O B E R	13	Munich – The Edge of War	Director: Christian Schwochow; Cast: Jeremy Irons, George MacKay, Jannis Niewöhner, Sandra Hüller, Liv Lisa Fries, August Diehl, Jessica Brown Findlay, Anjli Mohindra	Netflix; Based on Munich by Robert Harris	
O C T O B E R	14	Shepherd	Director: Russell Owen; Cast: Tom Hughes, Kate Dickie, Gaia Weiss, Greta Scacchi	Darkland Distribution	
O C T O B E R	22	Falling for Figaro	Director: Ben Lewin; Cast: Danielle Macdonald, Hugh Skinner, Joanna Lumley	Umbrella Entertainment (Co-produced by Australia)	
O C T O B E R	31	A Bird Flew In	Director: Kirsty Bell; Cast: Derek Jacobi, Jeff Fahey, Sadie Frost, Julie Dray, Sophie Kennedy Clark, Morgana Robinson		
N O V E M B E R	5	Operation Mincemeat	Director: John Madden; Cast: Colin Firth, Matthew Macfadyen, Kelly Macdonald, Penelope Wilton, Johnny Flynn, Jason Isaacs	Warner Bros. Pictures	
N O V E M B E R	7	Father Christmas Is Back	Directors: Philippe Martinez, Mick Davis; Cast: Elizabeth Hurley, Nathalie Cox, Talulah Riley, Kris Marshall, Caroline Quentin, April Bowlby, Ray Fearon, Naomi Frederick, John Cleese, Kelsey Grammer	Netflix	
N O V E M B E R	12	The Colour Room	Director: Claire McCarthy; Cast: Phoebe Dynevor, Matthew Goode, Kerry Fox, David Morrissey, Darci Shaw, Luke Norris	Sky Cinema	
N O V E M B E R	19	Resident Evil: Welcome to Raccoon City	Director: Johannes Roberts; Cast: Kaya Scodelario, Hannah John-Kamen, Robbie Amell, Tom Hopper, Avan Jogia, Donal Logue, Neal McDonough	Sony Pictures Releasing; Based on Resident Evil by Capcom (Co-produced by United States)	
N O V E M B E R	21	The Score	Director: Malachi Smyth; Cast: Johnny Flynn, Will Poulter, Naomi Ackie, Lydia Wilson		
N O V E M B E R	24	The Unforgivable	Director: Nora Fingscheidt; Cast: Sandra Bullock, Vincent D'Onofrio, Viola Davis, Emma Nelson, Rob Morgan, Tom Guiry, Will Pullen, Richard Thomas, Linda Emond, Aisling Franciosi, Jon Bernthal	Netflix; Based on Unforgiven by Sally Wainwright (Co-produced by Germany and the United States)	
N O V E M B E R	26	A Boy Called Christmas	Director: Gil Kenan; Cast: Henry Lawfull, Jim Broadbent, Kristen Wiig, Sally Hawkins, Toby Jones, Michiel Huisman, Maggie Smith, Zoe Colletti, Stephen Merchant	StudioCanal; Based on A Boy Called Christmas by Matt Haig	
D E C E M B E R	3	Boxing Day	Director: Aml Ameen; Cast: Aml Ameen, Aja Naomi King, Leigh-Anne Pinnock, Marianne Jean-Baptiste	Warner Bros. Pictures	
D E C E M B E R	18	Last Train to Christmas	Director: Julian Kemp; Cast: Michael Sheen, Thomas Law, Cary Elwes, Nathalie Emmanuel	Sky Cinema	
D E C E M B E R	22	The King's Man	Director: Matthew Vaughn; Cast: Ralph Fiennes, Harris Dickinson, Gemma Arterton, Rhys Ifans, Matthew Goode, Tom Hollander, Daniel Brühl, Djimon Hounsou, Charles Dance, Aaron Taylor-Johnson, Stanley Tucci	Walt Disney Studios Motion Pictures; Prequel to Kingsman: The Secret Service (co-produced by the United States)	

=== Other premieres ===
Title	Director	Release date	Ref.
The Afterlight	Charlie Shackleton	15 October 2021 (BFI London Film Festival)	
Alone Together	Bradley & Pablo	20 March 2021 (South by Southwest Film Festival)	
Almost Liverpool 8	Daniel Draper, Allan Melia	6 June 2021 (Sheffield Doc/Fest)	
Approaching Shadows	Roque Cameselle, Andrew Turner	3 December 2021 (BFI Busting the Bias Festival); 1 July 2022 (streaming); 22 April 2023 (Los Angeles)	
Arsène Wenger: Invincible	Gabriel Clarke, Christian Jeanpierre	11 November 2021	
Bank Job	Daniel Edelstyn, Hilary Powell	1 May 2021	
End of Term	Mat Menony	10 December 2021	
Fixed	Jez Alsop	22 November 2021	
The Football Monologues	Greg Cruttwell	October 2021	
Handsome	Luke White	28 February 2021 (virtual cinema) (Glasgow Film Festival)	
I Get Knocked Down	Dunstan Bruce, Sophie Robinson	6 June 2021 (Sheffield Doc/Fest)	
A Manchester Story	Anton Arenko	22 August 2021	
Our River...Our Sky	Maysoon Pachachi	19 August 2021 (Sarajevo Film Festival)	
Pelé	David Tryhorn, Ben Nicholas	23 February 2021	
Quant	Sadie Frost	9 October 2021 (BFI London Film Festival)	
The Real Charlie Chaplin	Peter Middleton, James Spinney; Cast: Charlie Chaplin	3 September 2021 (Telluride Film Festival)	
Sava	Matthew Somerville	5 August 2021	
Sparkling: The Story of Champagne	Frank Mannion	25 June 2021	
The Storms of Jeremy Thomas	Mark Cousins	10 July 2021 (Cannes Film Festival)	
The Story of Film: A New Generation	Mark Cousins	6 July 2021 (Cannes Film Festival)	
The Story of Looking	Mark Cousins	12 June 2021 (Sheffield DocFest)	
Sweetheart	Marley Morrison	3 March 2021 (Glasgow Film Festival)	
The Toll	Ryan Andrew Hooper	25 February 2021 (Glasgow Film Festival)	
The United Way	Mat Hodgson	10 May 2021	
A Violent Man	Ross McCall	5 May 2021 (Massive Underground)	
Zebra Girl	Stephanie Zari	28 May 2021	

=== Culturally British films ===
The following list comprises films not produced by Great Britain or the United Kingdom but is strongly associated with British culture. The films in this list should fulfil at least three of the following criteria:

- The film is adapted from a British source material.
- The story is at least partially set in the United Kingdom.
- The film was at least partially shot in the United Kingdom.
- Many of the film's cast and crew members are British.

Title	Country of origin	Adaptation	Story setting	Film locations	British cast and crew
83	India		London and Manchester, England	Kent, London, Buckingham and Glasgow, UK	Ray Burnet, Simon Balfour, Marek Hollands, Tony Richardson
Cruella	United States	The Hundred and One Dalmatians by Dodie Smith	England	England	Emma Thompson, Joel Fry, Emily Beecham, Mark Strong, Kirby Howell-Baptiste, Kelly Marcel (story)
Eternals	United States		England	Buckinghamshire, London and Oxford, UK	Gemma Chan, Richard Madden, Kit Harington, Ben Davis (cinematographer)
The Green Knight	United States; Canada	Sir Gawain and the Green Knight by Anonymous	Medieval England		Dev Patel, Sarita Choudhury, Sean Harris, Ralph Ineson, Erin Kellyman
Peter Rabbit 2: The Runaway	Australia; United States	Peter Rabbit by Beatrix Potter	England	Richmond, United Kingdom	James Cordon, David Oyelowo, Dominic Lewis (composer)
Sardar Udham	India		London, England	London, UK	Shaun Scott, Andrew Havill, Nicholas Gecks, Sam Retford, Simon Weir
The Tragedy of Macbeth	United States	Macbeth by William Shakespeare	Medieval Scotland		Bertie Carvel, Alex Hassell, Harry Melling, Kathryn Hunter, Ralph Ineson

== British winners ==
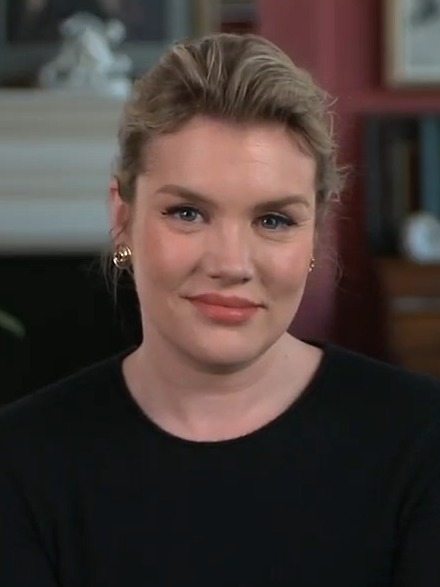
Emerald Fennell received multiple awards and nominations for writing and directing Promising Young Woman.

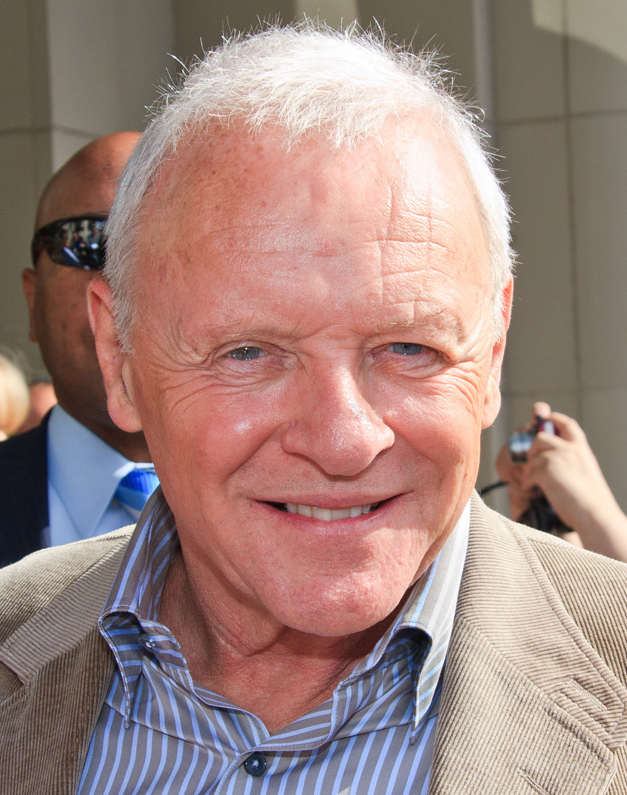
Anthony Hopkins received multiple awards and nominations for his performance in The Father.

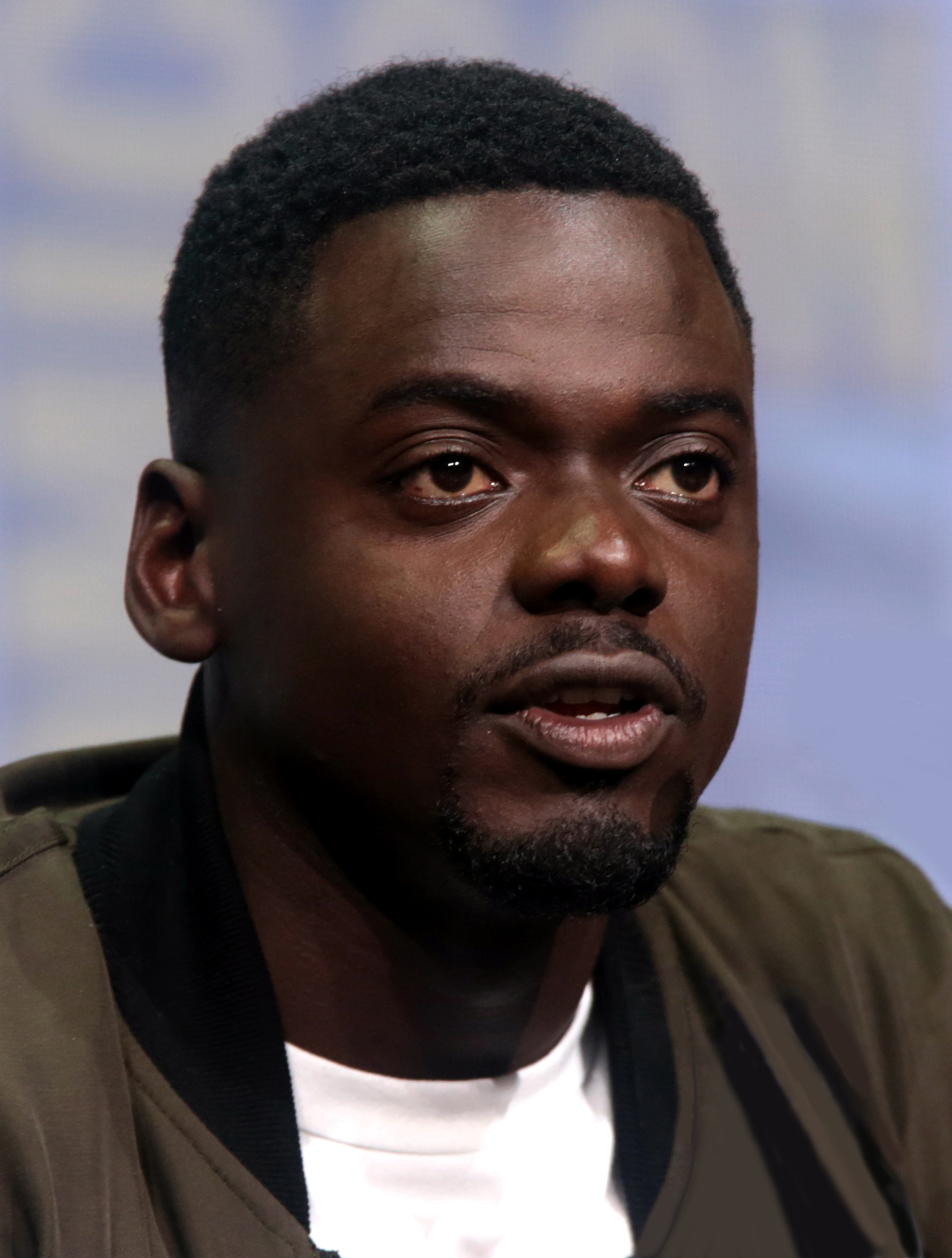
Daniel Kaluuya received multiple Best Supporting Actor awards for his performance in Judas and the Black Messiah.

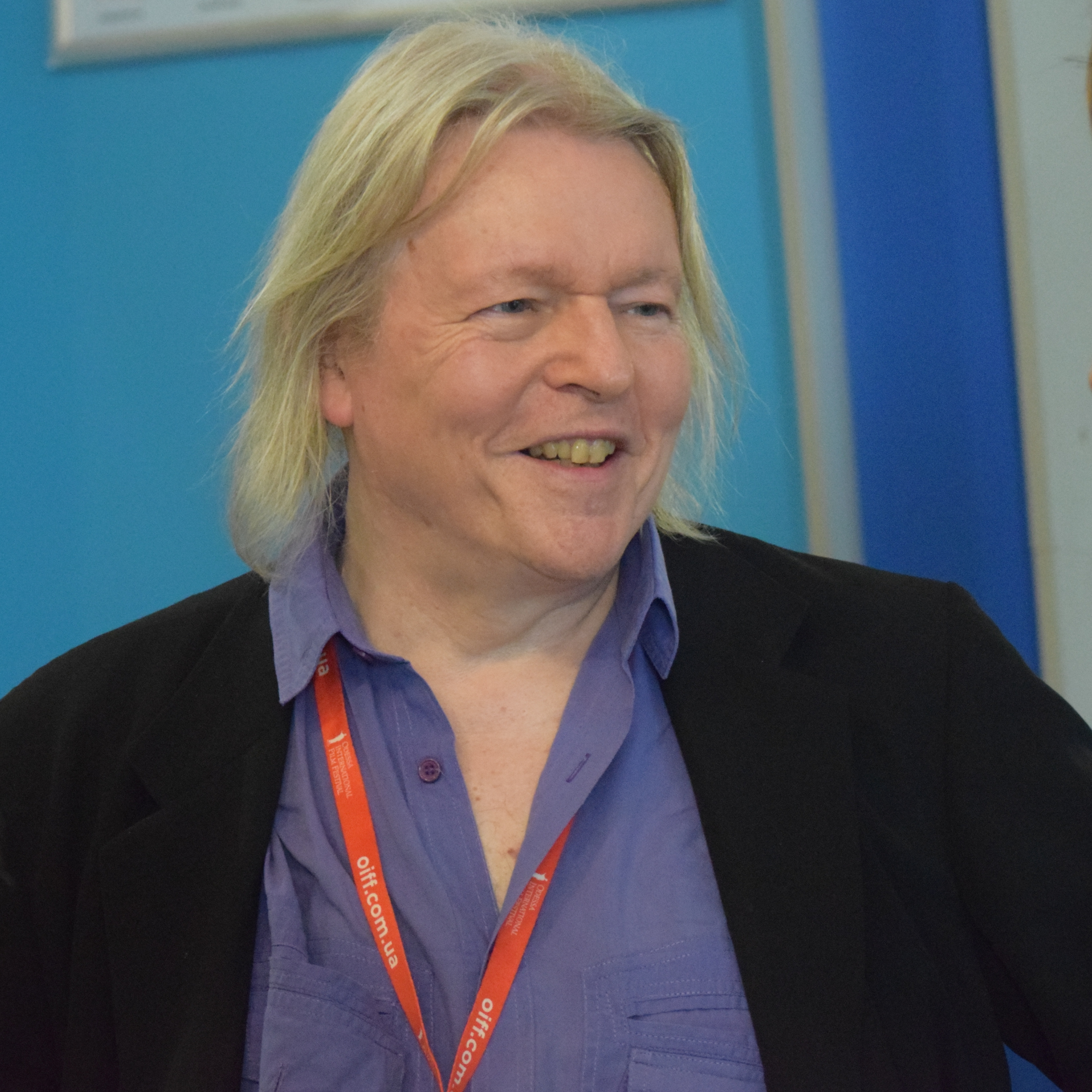
Christopher Hampton received the Academy Award for Best Adapted Screenplay for The Father.

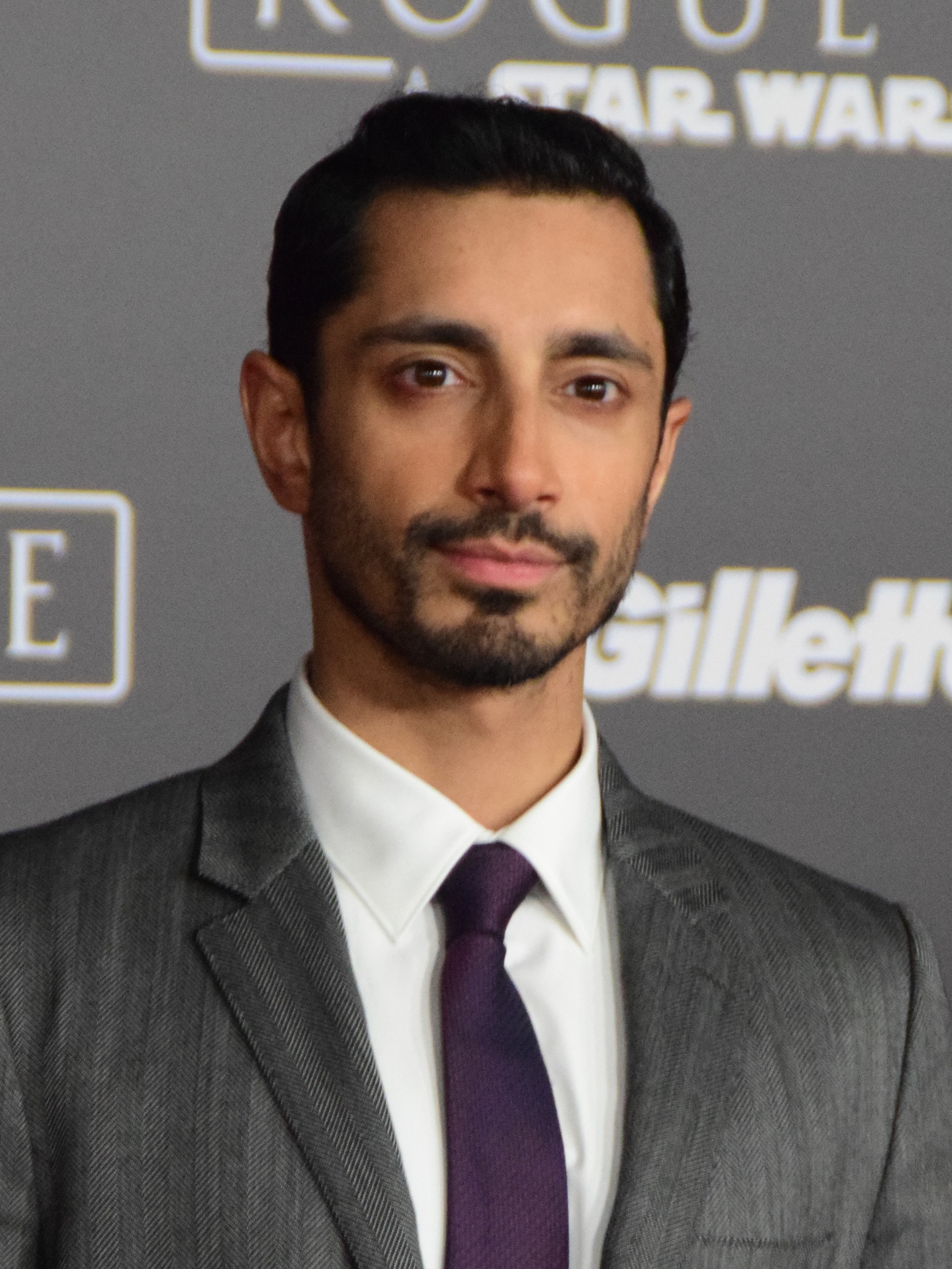
Riz Ahmed received multiple awards and nominations for his performance in Sound of Metal.

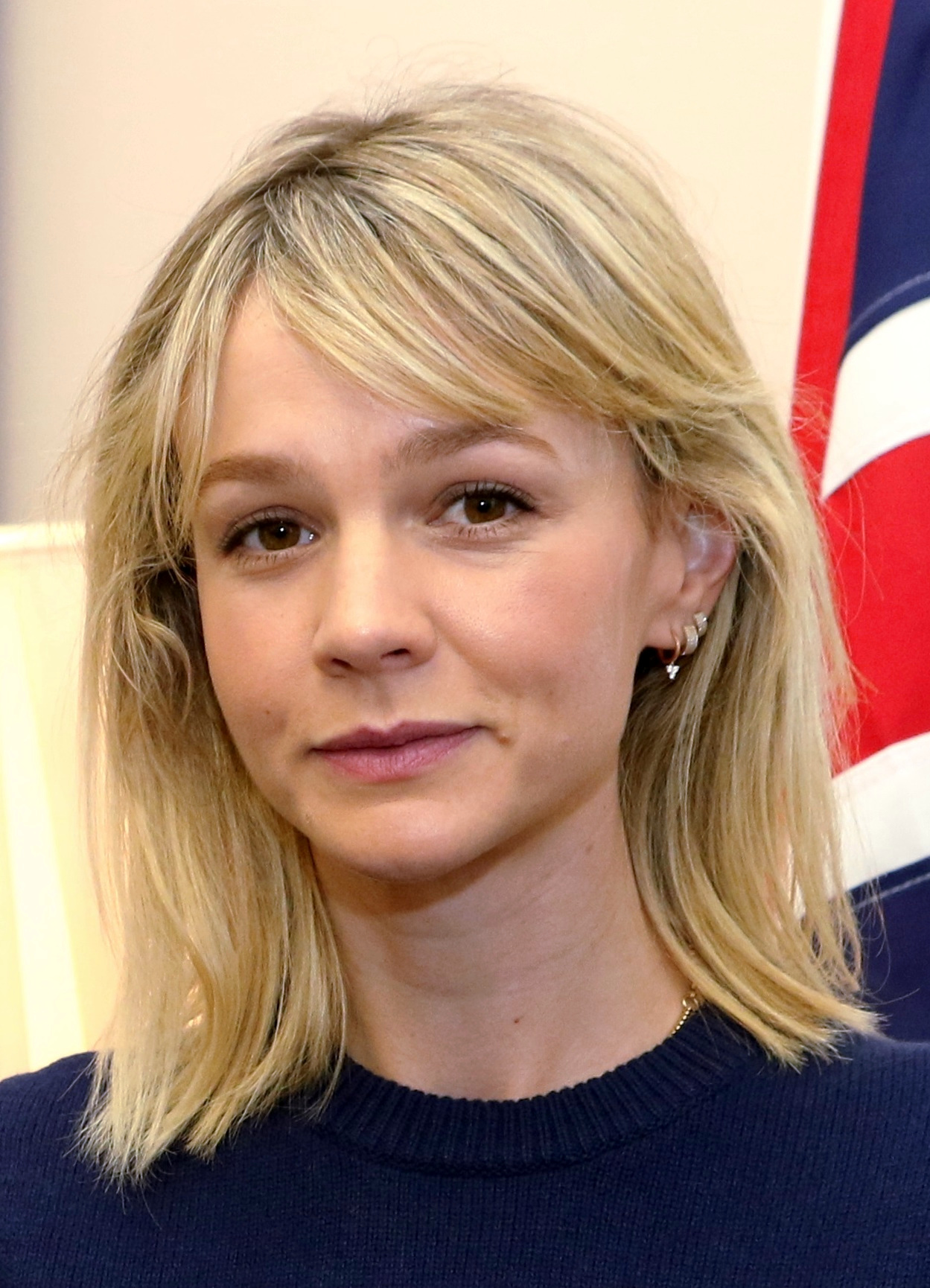
Carey Mulligan received multiple awards and nominations for her performance in Promising Young Woman.

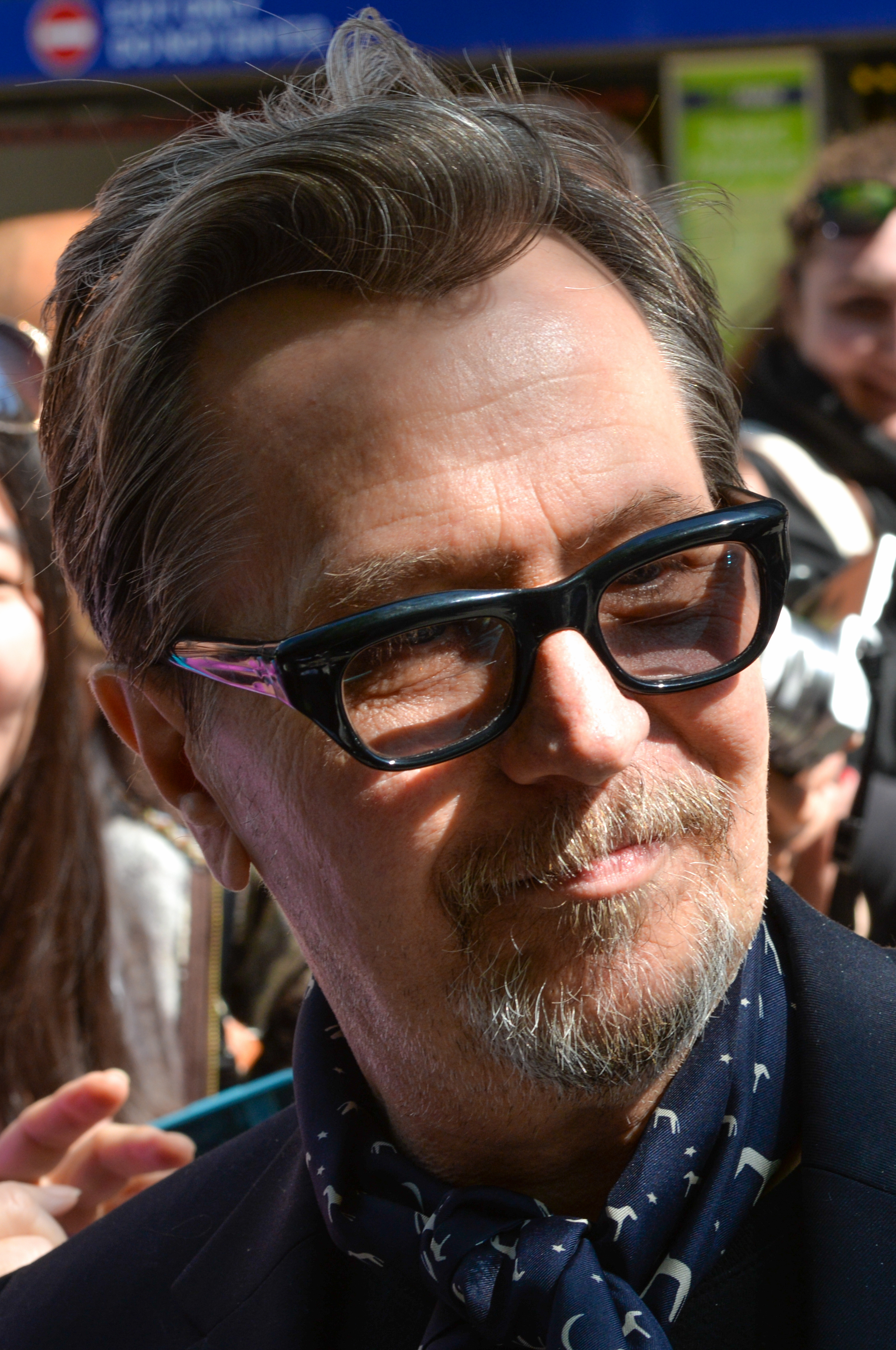
Gary Oldman received multiple nominations for his performance in Mank.

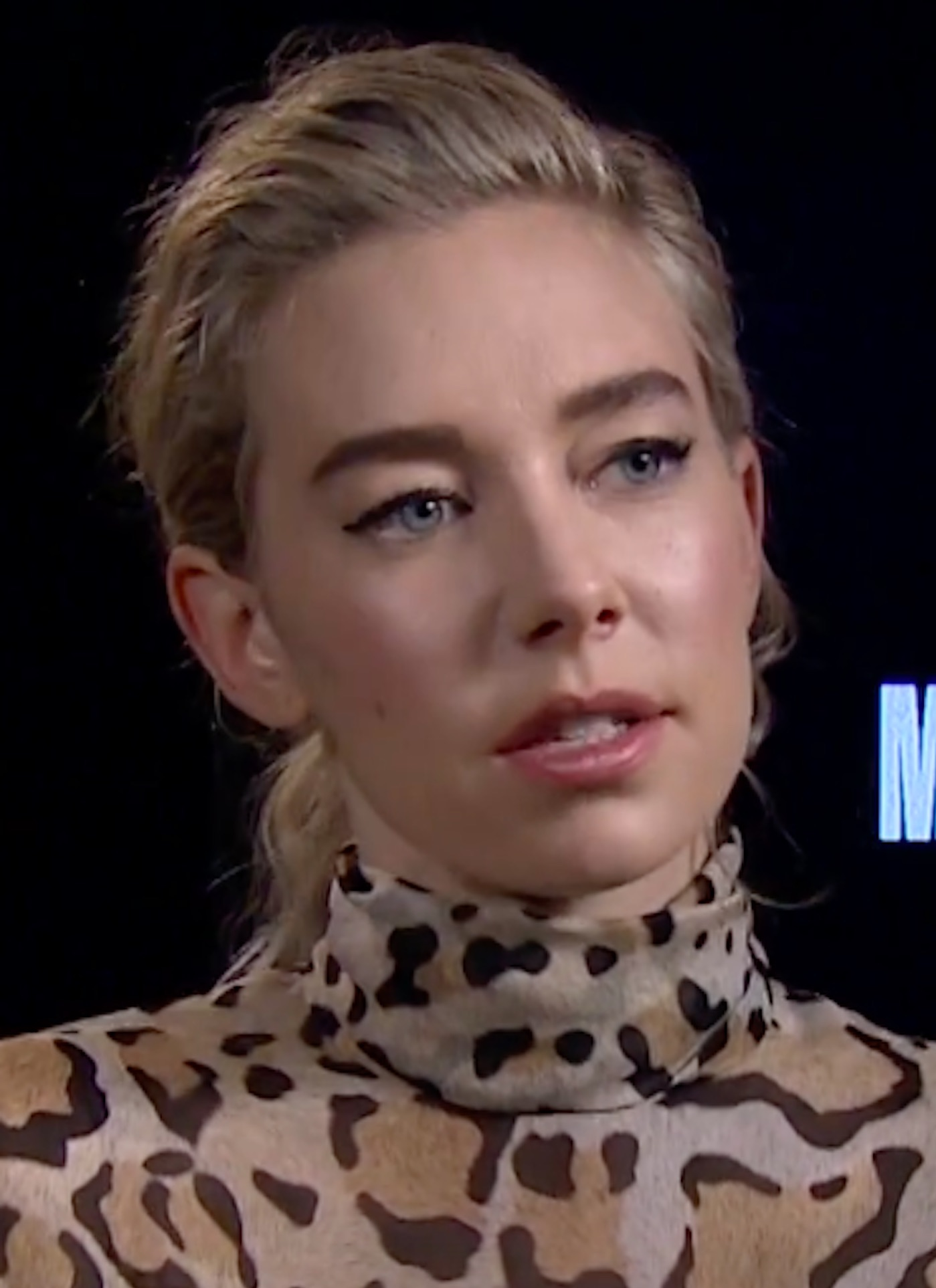
Vanessa Kirby received multiple nominations for her performance in Pieces of a Woman.

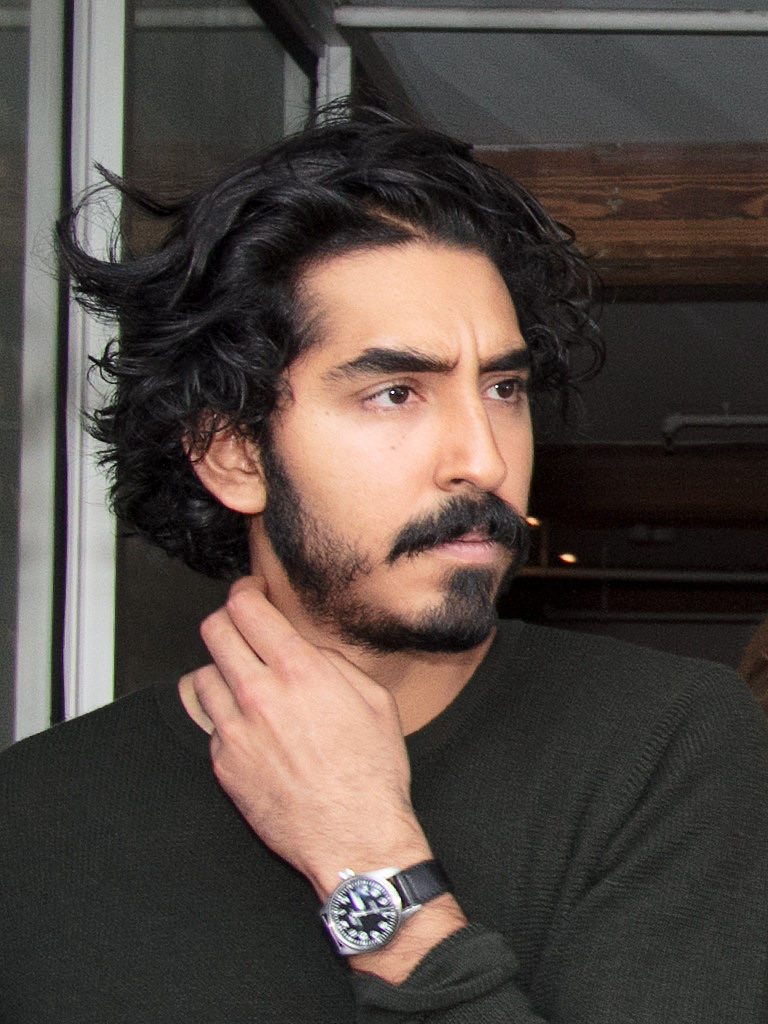
Dev Patel garnered critical acclaim and nominations for acting in The Personal History of David Copperfield.

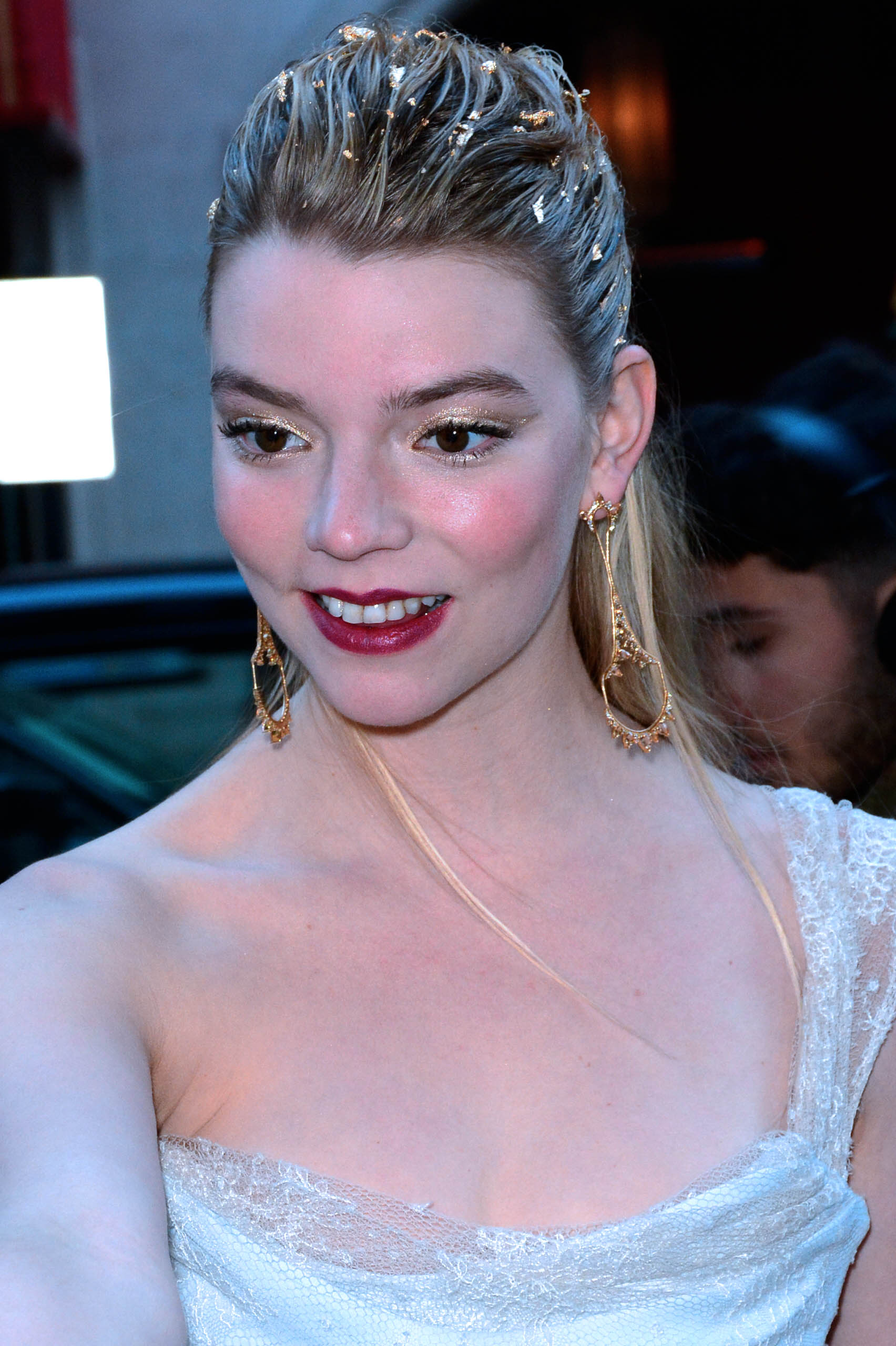
Anya Taylor-Joy received critical praise and multiple nominations for Emma.

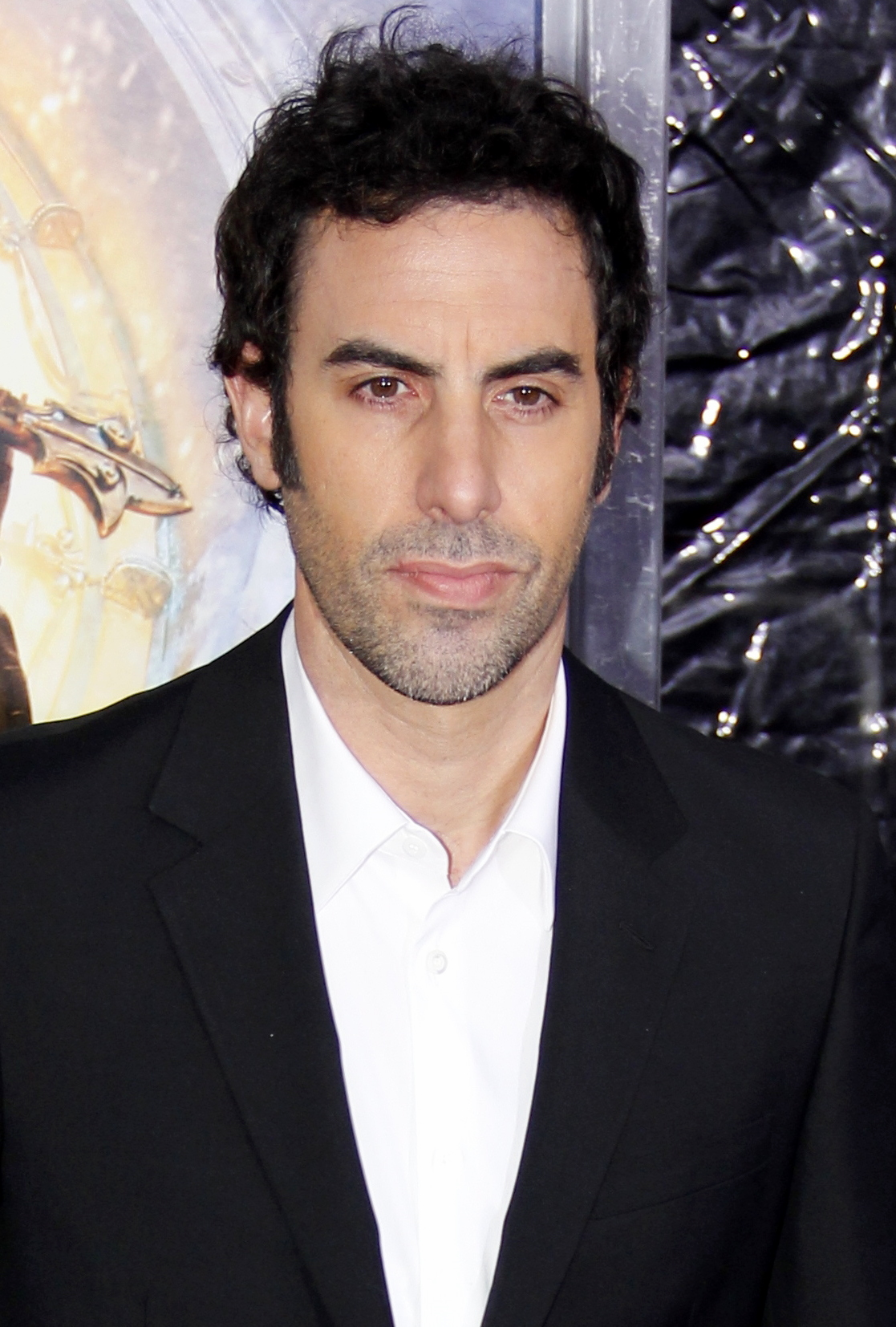
Sacha Baron Cohen received multiple awards and nominations for his lead performance in Borat Subsequent Moviefilm and supporting performance in The Trial of the Chicago 7.

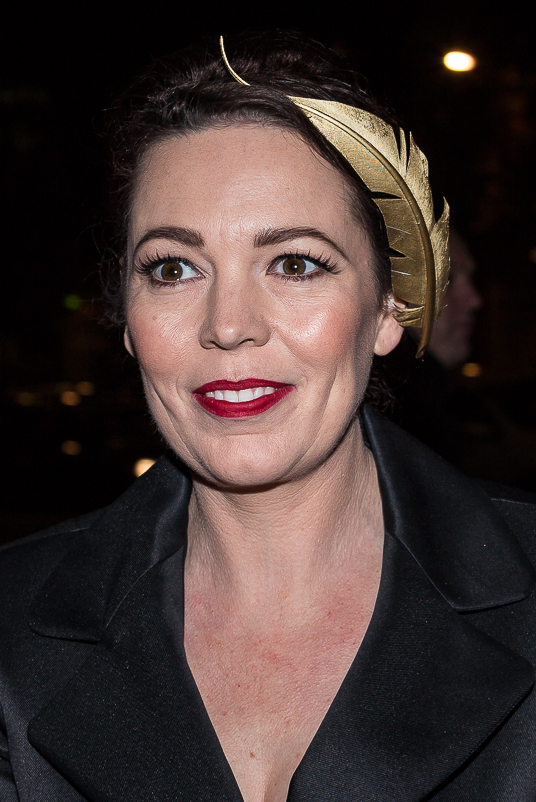
Olivia Colman received multiple nominations for her supporting role in The Father.

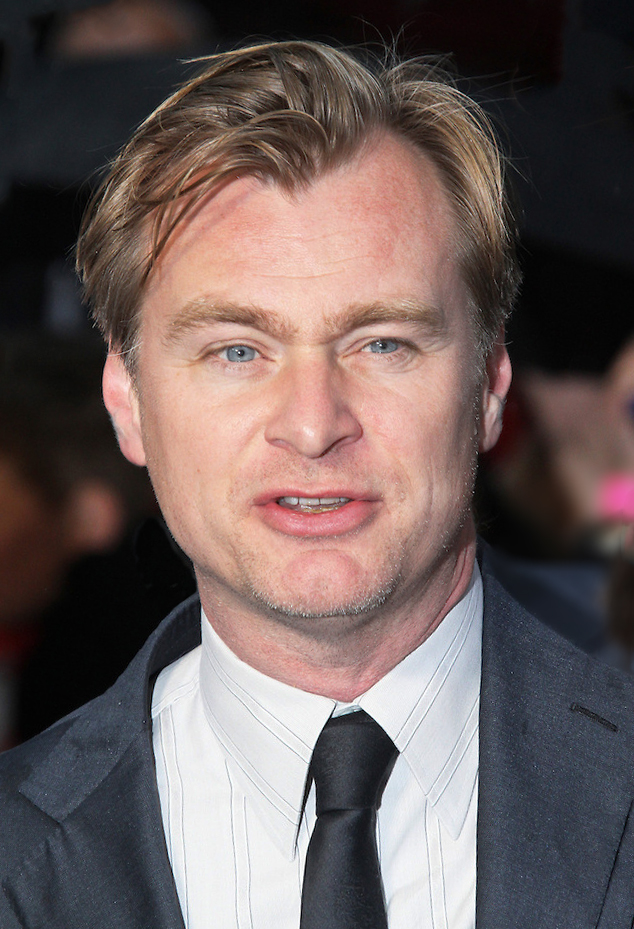
Christopher Nolan's film Tenet received multiple awards for Best Visual Effects.

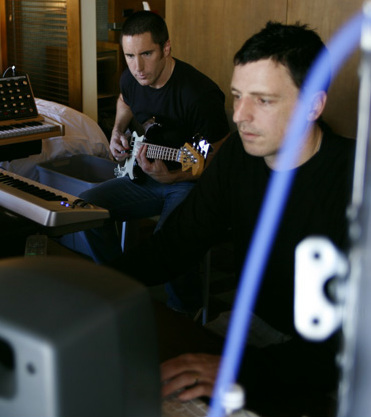
Atticus Ross (right) received multiple awards and nominations for Best Score for Soul as well as Mank.

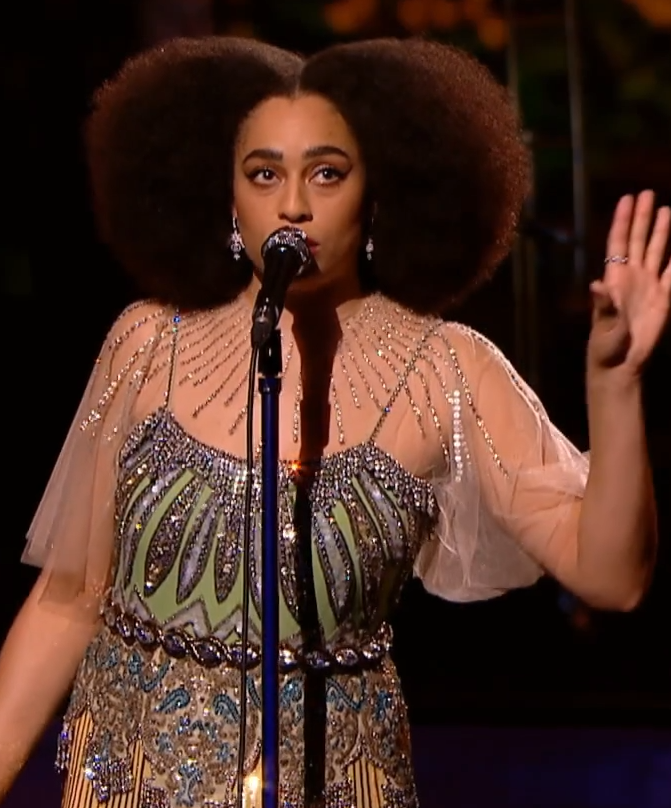
Celeste received Best Original Song nominations for "Hear My Voice" in The Trial of the Chicago 7.

Listed here are the British nominees at the five most prestigious film award ceremonies in the English-speaking world: the Academy Awards, British Academy Film Awards, Critics' Choice Awards, Golden Globe Awards, and Screen Actors Guild Awards, that were held in 2021, celebrating the best films of 2020 and early 2021.

=== Academy Awards ===
The 93rd Academy Awards, honouring the best films of 2020 and early 2021, were held on 25 April 2021.

British winners:

- The Father (Best Actor, Best Adapted Screenplay)
- Promising Young Woman (Best Original Screenplay)
- Tenet (Best Visual Effects)
- Andrew Jackson (Best Special Visual Effects – Tenet)
- Andrew Lockley (Best Special Visual Effects – Tenet)
- Anthony Hopkins (Best Actor – The Father)
- Atticus Ross (Best Original Score – Soul)
- Christopher Hampton (Best Adapted Screenplay – The Father)
- Daniel Kaluuya (Best Supporting Actor – Judas and the Black Messiah)
- Martin Desmond Roe (Best Live Action Short Film – Two Distant Strangers)

British nominees:

- Borat Subsequent Moviefilm (Best Supporting Actress, Best Adapted Screenplay)
- Emma (Best Makeup and Hairstyling, Best Costume Design)
- The Father (Best Picture, Best Supporting Actress, Best Production Design, Best Film Editing)
- Promising Young Woman (Best Picture, Best Director, Best Actress, Best Film Editing)
- A Shaun the Sheep Movie: Farmageddon (Best Animated Feature Film)
- Tenet (Best Production Design)
- Wolfwalkers (Best Animated Feature Film)
- Alexandra Byrne (Best Costume Design – Emma)
- Andrew Jackson (Best Special Visual Effects – Tenet)
- Andrew Lockley (Best Special Visual Effects – Tenet)
- Atticus Ross (Best Original Score – Mank)
- Carey Mulligan (Best Actress – Promising Young Woman)
- Celeste (Best Original Song – The Trial of the Chicago 7)
- Dan Mazer (Best Adapted Screenplay – Borat Subsequent Moviefilm)
- Dan Swimer (Best Adapted Screenplay – Borat Subsequent Moviefilm)
- Daniel Pemberton (Best Original Song – The Trial of the Chicago 7)
- Emerald Fennell (Best Picture, Best Director, Best Original Screenplay, Outstanding British Film – Promising Young Woman)
- Gary Oldman (Best Actor – Mank)
- Nathan Crowley (Best Production Design – Tenet)
- Oliver Tarney (Best Sound – News of the World)
- Olivia Colman (Best Supporting Actress – The Father)
- Peter Baynham (Best Adapted Screenplay – Borat Subsequent Moviefilm)
- Riz Ahmed (Best Actor – Sound of Metal)
- Sacha Baron Cohen (Best Supporting Actor – The Trial of the Chicago 7, Best Adapted Screenplay – Borat Subsequent Moviefilm)
- Vanessa Kirby (Best Actress – Pieces of a Woman)

=== British Academy Film Awards ===
The 74th British Academy Film Awards were held on 10 and 11 April 2021.

British winners:

- The Father (Best Actor, Best Adapted Screenplay)
- His House (Outstanding Debut by a British Writer, Director or Producer)
- Promising Young Woman (Best Original Screenplay, Outstanding British Film)
- Rocks (Best Casting)
- Tenet (Best Special Visual Effects)
- Andrew Jackson (Best Special Visual Effects – Tenet)
- Andrew Lockley (Best Special Visual Effects – Tenet)
- Anthony Hopkins (Best Actor – The Father)
- Atticus Ross (Best Original Music – Soul)
- Bukky Bakray (Rising New Star)
- Christopher Hampton (Best Adapted Screenplay – The Father)
- Daniel Kaluuya (Best Supporting Actor – Judas and the Black Messiah)
- Emerald Fennell (Best Original Screenplay, Outstanding British Film – Promising Young Woman)
- Farah Nabulsi (Best Short Film – The Present)
- Noel Clarke (Outstanding British Contribution to Cinema)

British nominees:

- Ammonite (Best Costume Design)
- Borat Subsequent Moviefilm (Best Supporting Actress)
- Calm with Horses (Best Supporting Actor, Best Supporting Actress, Best Casting, Outstanding British Film)
- David Attenborough: A Life on Our Planet (Best Documentary)
- The Dig (Best Adapted Screenplay, Best Costume Design, Best Makeup and Hair, Best Production Design, Outstanding British Film)
- Emma (Best Costume Design)
- The Father (Best Picture, Best Editing, Best Production Design, Outstanding British Film)
- His House (Best Actress, Outstanding British Film)
- Limbo (Outstanding British Film, Outstanding Debut by a British Writer, Director or Producer)
- The Mauritanian (Best Picture, Best Actor, Best Adapted Screenplay, Best Cinematography, Outstanding British Film)
- Moffie (Outstanding Debut by a British Writer, Director or Producer)
- Mogul Mowgli (Outstanding British Film)
- Promising Young Woman (Best Film, Best Casting, Best Editing, Best Original Music)
- Rebecca (Best Production Design)
- Rocks (Best Director, Best Actress, Best Supporting Actress, Best Original Screenplay, Outstanding British Film, Outstanding Debut by a British Writer, Director or Producer)
- Saint Maud (Outstanding British Film, Outstanding Debut by a British Writer, Director or Producer)
- Wolfwalkers (Best Animated Film)
- Alexandra Byrne (Best Costume Design – Emma)
- Alice Babidge (Best Costume Design – The Dig)
- Andrew Jackson (Best Special Visual Effects – Tenet)
- Andrew Lockley (Best Special Visual Effects – Tenet)
- Atticus Ross (Best Original Music – Mank)
- Bukky Bakray (Best Actress, Outstanding British Film – Rocks)
- Cathy Featherstone (Best Production Design – The Father)
- Chris Lawrence (Best Special Visual Effects – The Midnight Sky)
- Claire Wilson (Best Original Screenplay, Outstanding Debut by a British Writer, Director or Producer – Rocks)
- Conrad Khan (Rising Star Award)
- Jenny Shircore (Best Makeup and Hair – The Dig)
- Katie Spencer (Best Production Design – Rebecca)
- Kingsley Ben-Adir (Rising Star Award)
- Kosar Ali (Best Supporting Actress – Rocks)
- Lucy Pardee (Best Casting – Rocks)
- Mark Coulier (Best Makeup and Hair – Pinocchio)
- Michael O'Connor (Best Costume Design – Ammonite)
- Moira Buffini (Best Adapted Screenplay – The Dig)
- Morfydd Clark (Rising Star Award)
- Peter Francis (Best Production Design – The Father)
- Riz Ahmed (Best Actor – Sound of Metal)
- Sarah Greenwood (Best Production Design – Rebecca)
- Sarah Gavron (Best Director – Rocks)
- Sean Bobbitt (Best Cinematography – Judas and the Black Messiah)
- Sope Dirisu (Rising Star Award)
- Tatiana Macdonald (Best Production Design – The Dig)
- Theresa Ikoko (Best Original Screenplay, Outstanding Debut by a British Writer, Director or Producer – Rocks)
- Vanessa Kirby (Best Actress – Pieces of a Woman)
- Wunmi Mosaku (Best Actress – His House)
- Eyelash (Best Short Film)
- Lizard (Best Short Film)
- Lucky Break (Best Short Film)
- Miss Curvy (Best Short Film)
- The Present (Best Short Film)

=== Critics' Choice Awards ===
The 26th Critics' Choice Awards were held on 7 March 2021.

British winners:

- Borat Subsequent Moviefilm (Best Supporting Actress)
- Promising Young Woman (Best Actress, Best Original Screenplay)
- Tenet (Best Visual Effects)
- Atticus Ross (Best Score – Soul)
- Carey Mulligan (Best Actress – Promising Young Woman)
- Daniel Kaluuya (Best Supporting Actor – Judas and the Black Messiah)
- Emerald Fennell (Best Original Screenplay – Promising Young Woman)

British nominees:

- Borat Subsequent Moviefilm (Best Comedy)
- Emma (Best Costume Design, Best Production Design, Best Hair and Makeup)
- The Father (Best Actor, Best Supporting Actress, Best Adapted Screenplay)
- The Personal History of David Copperfield (Best Costume Design, Best Production Design)
- Promising Young Woman (Best Picture, Best Director, Best Costume Design, Best Hair and Makeup)
- Tenet (Best Production Design, Best Score)
- Alexandra Byrne (Best Costume Design – Emma)
- Anthony Hopkins (Best Actor – The Father)
- Atticus Ross (Best Score – Mank)
- Christopher Hampton (Best Adapted Screenplay – The Father)
- Dev Patel (Best Performance in a Motion Picture – Musical or Comedy – actor – The Personal History of David Copperfield)
- Emerald Fennell (Best Director – Promising Young Woman)
- Gary Oldman (Best Actor – Mank)
- Kave Quinn (Best Production Design – Emma)
- Nathan Crowley (Best Production Design – Tenet)
- Olivia Colman (Best Supporting Actress – The Father)
- Paul Greengrass – (Best Adapted Screenplay – News of the World)
- Robert Worley (Best Costume Design – The Personal History of David Copperfield)
- Riz Ahmed (Best Actor – Sound of Metal)
- Sacha Baron Cohen (Best Supporting Actor – The Trial of the Chicago 7)
- Vanessa Kirby (Best Actress – Pieces of a Woman)

=== Golden Globe Awards ===
The 78th Golden Globe Awards were held on 28 February 2021.

British winners:

- Borat Subsequent Moviefilm (Best Motion Picture – Musical or Comedy, Best Performance in a Motion Picture – Musical or Comedy – actor)
- Atticus Ross (Best Original Score – Soul)
- Daniel Kaluuya (Best Supporting Performance in a Motion Picture – actor – Judas and the Black Messiah)
- Rosamund Pike (Best Performance in a Motion Picture – Drama – actress – I Care a Lot)
- Sacha Baron Cohen (Best Performance in a Motion Picture – Musical or Comedy – actor – Borat Subsequent Moviefilm)

British nominees:

- Borat Subsequent Moviefilm (Best Performance in a Motion Picture – Musical or Comedy – actress)
- Emma (Best Performance in a Motion Picture – Musical or Comedy – actress)
- The Father (Best Motion Picture – Drama, Best Performance in a Motion Picture – Drama – actor, Best Supporting Performance in a Motion Picture – actress, Best Screenplay)
- The Mauritanian (Best Supporting Performance in a Motion Picture – actress)
- The Personal History of David Copperfield (Best Performance in a Motion Picture – Musical or Comedy – actor)
- Promising Young Woman (Best Motion Picture – Drama, Best Performance in a Motion Picture – Drama – actress, Best Director, Best Screenplay)
- Tenet (Best Original Score)
- Wolfwalkers (Best Animated Feature Film)
- Anthony Hopkins (Best Performance in a Motion Picture – Drama – actor – The Father)
- Anya Taylor-Joy (Best Performance in a Motion Picture – Musical or Comedy – actress – Emma)
- Atticus Ross (Best Original Score – Mank)
- Carey Mulligan (Best Performance in a Motion Picture – Drama – actress – Promising Young Woman)
- Christopher Hampton (Best Screenplay – The Father)
- Celeste (Best Original Song – The Trial of the Chicago 7)
- Daniel Pemberton (Best Original Song – The Trial of the Chicago 7)
- Dev Patel (Best Performance in a Motion Picture – Musical or Comedy – actor – The Personal History of David Copperfield)
- Emerald Fennell (Best Director, Best Screenplay – Promising Young Woman)
- Gary Oldman (Best Performance in a Motion Picture – Drama – actor – Mank)
- James Corden (Best Performance in a Motion Picture – Musical or Comedy – actor – The Prom)
- Olivia Colman (Best Supporting Performance in a Motion Picture – actress – The Father)
- Riz Ahmed (Best Performance in a Motion Picture – Drama – actor – Sound of Metal)
- Sacha Baron Cohen (Best Supporting Performance in a Motion Picture – actor – The Trial of the Chicago 7)
- Vanessa Kirby (Best Performance in a Motion Picture – Drama – actress – Pieces of a Woman)

=== Screen Actors Guild Awards ===
The 27th Screen Actors Guild Awards were held on 4 April 2021.

British winners:

- Alex Sharp (Outstanding Performance by a Cast in a Motion Picture – The Trial of the Chicago 7)
- Daniel Kaluuya (Outstanding Performance by a Male Actor in a Supporting Role – Judas and the Black Messiah)
- Eddie Redmayne (Outstanding Performance by a Cast in a Motion Picture – The Trial of the Chicago 7)
- Mark Rylance (Outstanding Performance by a Cast in a Motion Picture – The Trial of the Chicago 7)
- Sacha Baron Cohen (Outstanding Performance by a Male Actor in a Supporting Role, Outstanding Performance by a Cast in a Motion Picture – The Trial of the Chicago 7)

British nominees:

- Anthony Hopkins (Outstanding Performance by a Male Actor in a Leading Role – The Father)
- Carey Mulligan (Outstanding Performance by a Female Actor in a Leading Role – Promising Young Woman)
- Delroy Lindo (Outstanding Performance by a Cast in a Motion Picture – Da 5 Bloods)
- Gary Oldman (Outstanding Performance by a Male Actor in a Leading Role – Mank)
- Jonny Coyne (Outstanding Performance by a Cast in a Motion Picture – Ma Rainey's Black Bottom)
- Kingsley Ben-Adir (Outstanding Performance by a Cast in a Motion Picture – One Night in Miami...)
- Olivia Colman (Outstanding Performance by a Female Actor in a Supporting Role – The Father)
- Riz Ahmed (Outstanding Performance by a Male Actor in a Leading Role – Sound of Metal)
- Vanessa Kirby (Outstanding Performance by a Female Actor in a Leading Role – Pieces of a Woman)

== See also ==
- Lists of British films
- 2021 in film
- 2021 in British music
- 2021 in British radio
- 2021 in British television
- 2021 in the United Kingdom
- List of British films of 2020
- List of British films of 2022
