= Def Mix Vol. 1 =

Compilation album by Roxanne Shante
- Released: October 1985
- Recorded: 1984–1985
- Genres: Hip-hop; electro
- Length: 47:40
- Label: Pop Art
- Producers: Marley Marl; Lawrence Goodman; Ed Drummond; Almighty 3

Roxanne Shante chronology
Def Mix Vol. 1 (1985)	Bad Sister (1989)

Professional ratings
Review scores
Source	Rating
AllMusic	2/5 stars

Def Mix Vol. 1 is a compilation album by American rapper Roxanne Shante, released in October 1985 by Pop Art Records. Although four of the ten tracks are her own songs (the rest belong to other artists on the record label) the album was released as a Shanté solo compilation.

The album debuted at No. 73 on the October 13, 1985, Top Black Albums chart in Billboard magazine. Two weeks later, the album peaked at No. 61 on the chart.

In 1999, Ego Trip's editors ranked Def Mix Vol. 1 at No. 23 in their list of Hip Hop's 40 Greatest Albums 1979–85 in Ego Trip's Book of Rap Lists.

== Track listing ==
All tracks are as listed on the original vinyl release.

=== Side one ===
No.	Title	Writer(s)	Producer(s)	Length
1.	"Roxanne's Revenge"	Lolita Gooden; Marlon Williams	M.M.E. Ltd.	4:50
2.	"D.J. Cuttin" (performed by N.Y.C. Cutter)	Marlon Williams	Marley Marl	4:10
3.	"To the Other MC's" (performed by Almighty 3)	D.L. McFarland; D. Cisco; D. Farley	Almighty 3	4:00
4.	"Runaway"	Lolita Gooden; Marlon Williams	M.M.E. Ltd.	4:04
5.	"Queen of Rox"	Lolita Gooden; Marlon Williams	M.M.E. Ltd.	5:17

=== Side two ===
No.	Title	Writer(s)	Producer(s)	Length
1.	"Sexy Style" (performed by Galaxxy)	Lawrence Goodman	Lawrence Goodman	5:03
2.	"Love Emergency" (performed by Mikki)	Lawrence Goodman	Lawrence Goodman	5:28
3.	"Where's the Beat" (performed by Galaxxy)	Ed Drummond; Lawrence Goodman	Ed Drummond · Lawrence Goodman	4:13
4.	"Cold Cash Money" (performed by Eddie "D")	Ed Drummond; Lawrence Goodman	Ed Drummond; Lawrence Goodman	6:05
5.	"Bite This"	Lolita Gooden; Marlon Williams; S. Moltkes	M.M.E. Ltd.	4:30

== Personnel ==
- Roxanne Shante – vocals (tracks: A1, A4, A5, B5)
- Marley Marl – production (tracks: A1–A5, B5)
- Lawrence Goodman – production (tracks: B1–B4)
- Ed Drummond – production (tracks: B3, B4)
- Joe "The Butcher" Nicolo – engineering

== Charts ==
Chart (1985)	Peak position
US Top R&B/Hip-Hop Albums (Billboard)	61
