= Chanté Adams =

American actress (born 1994)

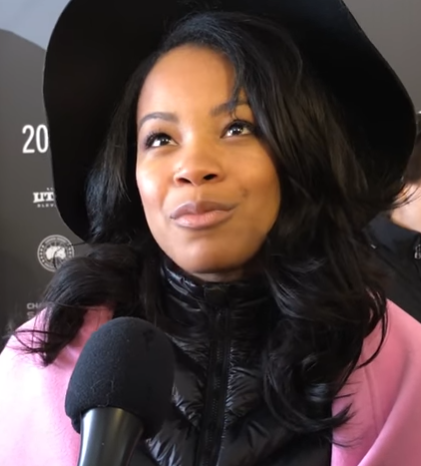
- Adams at the 2017 Sundance Film Festival
- Born: December 16, 1994 (age 31); Detroit, Michigan, U.S.
- Education: Carnegie Mellon University (BFA)
- Occupation: Actress
- Years active: 2009–present
- Notable work: Roxanne Roxanne

Chanté Adams (born December 16, 1994) is an American actress. She starred in the 2017 biopic Roxanne Roxanne, for which she received the Sundance Special Jury Prize for Breakthrough Performance.

== Life and career ==
Adams was born and raised in Detroit, Michigan. She began acting as a student at Cass Technical High School. She received her bachelor's degree from Carnegie Mellon University's School of Drama, after which she moved to New York to pursue an acting career.

One month after moving to New York, Adams was invited to audition for the lead role in a biopic about rapper Roxanne Shanté. She was cast in the role and filming began eight days later. For her performance in Roxanne Roxanne, Adams received the Special Jury Prize for Breakthrough Performance at 2017 Sundance.

Adams has appeared in the films Monsters and Men (2018), Bad Hair (2020), and The Photograph (2020).

In 2021, Adams starred opposite Michael B. Jordan in the romantic drama A Journal for Jordan, directed by Denzel Washington. In 2022, she co-starred in A League of Their Own, the Amazon television adaptation of the 1992 film of the same name, along with D'Arcy Carden, Abbi Jacobson, Roberta Colindrez, Kelly McCormack, and Priscilla Delgado.

== Filmography ==
=== Film ===
Year	Title	Role	Notes	Ref.
2017	Roxanne Roxanne	Roxanne Shanté	Won Sundance Film Festival Special Jury Prize for Breakthrough Performance (2017)	
2018	Monsters and Men	Zoe		
2018	Good Girls Get High	Ashanti		
2020	Bad Hair	Linda Bludso		
2020	The Photograph	Young Christina Eames		
2021	Voyagers	Phoebe		
2021	A Journal for Jordan	Dana Canedy		

=== Television ===
Year	Title	Role	Notes	Ref.
2022	A League of Their Own	Maxine "Max" Chapman	Main role	
2024	A Man in Full	Jill Hensley	Miniseries	

=== Broadway ===
Year	Title	Role	Notes	Ref.
2022	Skeleton Crew	Shanita	Nominated for Outer Critics Circle Award for Outstanding Featured Actress in a Play	

== Awards and nominations ==
Award	Year	Category	Nominated work	Result	Ref.
Sundance Film Festival	2017	Special Jury Prize for Breakthrough Performance	Roxanne, Roxanne	Won	
Outer Critics Circle Award	2022	Outstanding Featured Actress in a Play	Skeleton Crew	Nominated	
