= Girls Town (1996 film) =

- Theatrical release poster
- Directed by: Jim McKay
- Written by: Denise Casano; Anna Grace; Bruklin Harris; Jim McKay; Lili Taylor
- Produced by: Lauren Zalaznick
- Starring: Lili Taylor; Bruklin Harris; Aunjanue Ellis; Anna Grace
- Cinematography: Russell Lee Fine
- Edited by: Alex Hall; Jim McKay
- Music by: Guru
- Distributed by: October Films
- Release dates: January 20, 1996 (Sundance); August 21, 1996 (United States)
- Running time: 90 minutes
- Country: United States
- Language: English
- Box office: $8,677

Girls Town is the 1996 feature film directing debut by Jim McKay. It stars Lili Taylor, Bruklin Harris, Anna Grace, and Aunjanue Ellis in her film debut. The plot follows a group of girl friends and their coming-of-age during their senior year of high school in urban America. The screenplay for the film was mostly developed through improvisations among the four lead actresses.

Girls Town had its world premiere on January 20, 1996, at the Sundance Film Festival, where it won the Filmmakers' Trophy. It received a limited release in the United States on August 21, 1996. The Girls Town soundtrack was released on August 20, 1996, by Mercury Records.

== Synopsis ==
Four girls—Patti, Emma, Angela, and Nikki—are completing their senior year of high school and ponder what might be their last year together before they all go on separate paths. Emma and Nikki in particular are bound for college, while Patti is an unwed teen mother.

When Nikki unexpectedly commits suicide, the three remaining girls discover Nikki's journal and learn she had been raped while working as an intern at a local magazine. The shattering revelation causes the girls to realize they didn't know Nikki, or even each other, as well as they thought. They also begin to offer up their own stories of oppression by the men in their lives, with Emma revealing to the group that she too was raped. The girls band together to seek revenge on Emma's attacker, Patti's abusive ex-boyfriend, and finally, Nikki's rapist.

== Cast ==
- Lili Taylor as Patti Lucci
- Bruklin Harris as Angela
- Anna Grace as Emma
- Aunjanue Ellis as Nikki
- Asia Minor as Marlys Giovanni
- Michael Imperioli as Anthony
- John Ventimiglia as Eddie
- Guillermo Díaz as Dylan
- Nathaniel Freeman as Cam
- Tom Gilroy as Richard Helms
- Ramya Pratt as Tomy
- Carl Kwaku Ford as Jessie (Boom Box Guy)
- Mary Joy as Cora
- Tara Carnes as Heather
- Yassira as Benita
- Ernestine Jackson as Nikki's Mom
- Stephanie Berry as Angela's Mom
- Shondalin as Teacher
- Andrew von Dusan as Helms' Co-Worker (as Andrew Vandusen)

== Production ==
Workshops and preparation for Girls Town took place over a months-long period, while actual shooting took place within two weeks. The film was shot in Hackensack, New Jersey and the Astoria neighborhood of Queens in New York City.

== Reception ==
Girls Town received acclaim from critics. On the review aggregator website Rotten Tomatoes, 81% of 42 critics' reviews are positive. The website's consensus reads: "Lili Taylor is terrific in Girls Town, a freewheeling and shaggy portrait of female rage." Metacritic, which uses a weighted average, assigned the film a score of 64 out of 100, based on 20 critics, indicating "generally favorable" reviews.

Writing for Variety, Emanuel Levy said, "Jim McKay’s striking feature debut, an empowering feminist saga that makes its points without being overly preachy, should appeal to young viewers, particularly women who’re likely to identify with the film’s strongly independent heroines." Levy continued, "McKay reveals a sensitive ear to the psyche and feelings of young, mostly working-class women who are determined not only to establish themselves as worthy individuals, but to fight against a social system that has oppressed them for too long." Levy credited the "credible dramatic situations and authentic lingo, the film's two most impressive assets," to the dialogue that was developed through improvisation and workshops, and concluded the film "conveys effectively the sheer joy and catharsis in the girls’ reluctance to quietly accept their place in society."

Roger Ebert wrote,

"In every high school there are always 'popular' students and various groups of outsiders. It is always thought better to be “popular.” One of the lessons of 'Girls Town' is that popularity is based on the opinion of others, while an outsider chooses that status on the basis of her opinion of herself. We see Patti, Emma and Angela behaving unwisely and recklessly in 'Girls Town', but we also see them growing, and trying themselves, and discovering who they are. It is a painful process--so painful, many people never do it. I would like to see another movie in three or four years, about what has happened to these angry, gifted friends."

Ebert added, "the movie's qualities are in the performances and dialogue. We hear the convincing sound of smart teenage girls uncomfortably trying to discover and share the truth about themselves, and we sense the social structure of the school in scenes (usually in the women's washroom) where the three confront their 'popular' classmates." In a more critical review, Chris Hicks of Deseret News called the film an "acting tour de force" but said the plot felt aimless.
