= A Journal for Jordan =

2021 film by Denzel Washington

- Theatrical release poster
- Directed by: Denzel Washington
- Screenplay by: Virgil Williams
- Based on: A Journal for Jordan: A Story of Love and Honor by Dana Canedy
- Produced by: Todd Black; Denzel Washington; Michael B. Jordan; Jason Blumenthal; Steve Tisch
- Starring: Michael B. Jordan; Chanté Adams
- Cinematography: Maryse Alberti
- Edited by: Hughes Winborne
- Music by: Marcelo Zarvos
- Production companies: Columbia Pictures; Outlier Society; Mundy Lane Entertainment; Escape Artists; Bron Studios; Creative Wealth Media
- Distributed by: Sony Pictures Releasing
- Release dates: December 9, 2021 (AMC Lincoln Square); December 25, 2021 (United States)
- Running time: 131 minutes
- Country: United States
- Language: English
- Budget: $25 million
- Box office: $6.7 million

A Journal for Jordan is a 2021 American romantic drama film directed and co-produced by Denzel Washington from a screenplay written by Virgil Williams, based on the memoir A Journal for Jordan: A Story of Love and Honor by Dana Canedy. The film stars Michael B. Jordan (who also co-produced the film) and Chanté Adams in the lead roles, along with Jalon Christian, Robert Wisdom, and Tamara Tunie in supporting roles.

The film was released by Sony Pictures Releasing, through the Columbia Pictures banner, on December 25, 2021. It received mixed reviews from critics.

== Plot ==
Based on a true story, while 1st Sergeant Charles Monroe King is deployed in Iraq, he keeps a journal of love and advice for his infant son. Sharing this journal with her son, his fiancée, Dana Canedy reflects on her unlikely yet powerful romantic relationship with King.

== Cast ==
- Michael B. Jordan as 1st Sergeant Charles Monroe King
- Chanté Adams as Dana Canedy
- Jalon Christian as Jordan
- Robert Wisdom as Sergeant T.J. Canedy
- Tamara Tunie as Penny Canedy
- Jasmine Batchelor as Gwen Canedy
- Marchánt Davis as Mike Canedy
- Susan Pourfar as Miriam
- Cleveland Berto as Mohammed
- Vanessa Aspillga as Robin
- Grey Henson as Ciro
- Johnny M. Wu as Manny
- David Wilson Barnes as Schaefer
- Melanie Nicholls-King as Kaleshia

== Production ==
Todd Black read Dana Canedy's memoir before it was published in 2008, was impressed, and asked Sony to purchase the movie rights and Denzel Washington to produce it into a film with him. In 2017, Black asked Virgil Williams to consider writing the script, and he was signed on as screenwriter by January 2018. In 2018, Williams and Black gave a first draft of the script to Washington, who responded with excitement and confirmed that he would direct the film. In February 2019, it was reported that Michael B. Jordan would play the lead role. In October 2020, Chanté Adams was cast in the film. As of December 2020, production had begun. In February 2021, Robert Wisdom, Johnny M. Wu, and Jalon Christian joined the cast. In March 2021, Tamara Tunie joined the cast.

== Release ==
A Journal for Jordan was originally scheduled by Sony Pictures Releasing for a limited theatrical release on December 10, 2021, before going wide on December 22. In October 2021, the film was pushed to a wide theatrical release on December 25, on Christmas Day, without a limited release. The film had its world premiere at the AMC Lincoln Square Theatre on December 9, 2021. The film was released video-on-demand on January 11, 2022, and on Blu-ray and DVD on March 8, 2022.

== Reception ==
=== Box office ===
In the United States, A Journal for Jordan was released alongside American Underdog and the wide expansion of Licorice Pizza, and was projected to gross around $5 million from 2,500 theaters over its first two days of release. It made $1.2 million on its first day and $1 million on its second, debuting to $2.2 million and finishing eighth at the box office. In its second weekend, the film finished ninth with $1.2 million. The film dropped out of the box office top ten in its third weekend, finishing twelfth with $600,880.

=== Critical response ===
On review aggregator website Rotten Tomatoes, the film holds an approval rating of 39% based on 62 reviews, with an average rating of 5.2/10. The site's critics consensus reads, "A Journal for Jordan's affecting fact-based story stumbles onscreen due to Denzel Washington's undistinguished direction and overly sentimental approach." On Metacritic, it has a weighted average score of 42 out of 100 based on 20 reviews, indicating "mixed or average" reviews. Audiences polled by CinemaScore gave the film an average grade of "A−" on an A+ to F scale.

The motion picture had three nominations at the 53rd NAACP Image Awards for Outstanding Directing in a Motion Picture, Outstanding Writing in a Motion Picture and Outstanding Breakthrough Performance in a Motion Picture for Jalon Christian's performance.
