= Roxanne Wars =

Series of hip-hop rivalries in the 1980s

- "Hanging Out", with B-side "Roxanne, Roxanne" by U.T.F.O.
- Date: 1984–1985
- Medium: Diss tracks
- Status: Ended in 1985 with the release of "The Final Word – No More Roxanne" by the East Coast Crew

Parties
U.T.F.O.	Roxanne Shante

Works
"The Real Roxanne"; "Roxanne, Roxanne, Pt. 2: Calling Her A Crab"	"Roxanne's Revenge"; "Bite This"; "Queen of Rox (Shanté Rox On)"

The Roxanne Wars were a series of hip-hop rivalries during the mid-1980s, yielding rap music's first diss record and perhaps the most answer records in history. It is one of hip-hop's earliest feuds and perhaps the first "rap beef". The dispute arose over a failed appearance at a radio promotional show and primarily involved Roxanne Shante (Lolita Shante Gooden) and the Real Roxanne (Adelaida Martinez).

== History ==
=== 1984–1985: Background and "Roxanne's Revenge" ===
In 1984, the hip-hop trio U.T.F.O., produced by the R&B group Full Force, released a single titled "Hanging Out", which did not perform well. However, the single's B side, "Roxanne, Roxanne", a song about a woman who would not respond to their advances, gained much attention and airplay. Soon after, 14-year-old Lolita Shante Gooden was walking outside of the Queensbridge housing project in New York City when she heard Tyrone Williams, disc jockey Mr. Magic and record producer Marley Marl talking about how U.T.F.O. had canceled a show that the men had promoted.

Gooden offered to record a hip-hop song that would exact revenge on U.T.F.O. The original "Street Version" was entirely freestyled by Gooden in one seven-minute-long take and recorded on tape in Marl's apartment. The beats were copied from an instrumental version of "Roxanne, Roxanne". The recording was pressed onto 100 initial copies that were rushed into distribution on the streets in late 1984, with Gooden billed as Roxanne Shante. It was confrontational and laced with profanities, but it became an instant hit that sold more than 250,000 copies in the New York area alone. Select Records claimed copyright on the instrumental track, which led Pop Art Records to negotiate an agreement whereby all future copies of "Roxanne's Revenge" would feature a different track. It was re-released in early 1985 with new beats and vocals, and the obscenities removed. The re-release version peaked at No. 22 on the Hot R&B/Hip-Hop Songs chart.

=== 1985: "The Real Roxanne", the Roxanne Wars from beginning to end ===
Following the success of "Roxanne's Revenge", U.T.F.O. and Full Force released "The Real Roxanne", their own answer record. While not directly aimed at Roxanne Shante, this record featured Elease Jack, under the moniker of the Real Roxanne, who was soon replaced by Adelaida Martinez. This version became a hit and caused a flood of Roxanne-related hip-hop records, Over the next year, at least 30 (and more than 100, according to some claims) such records were produced. Some of the most notable include:

- "Sparky's Turn (Roxanne, You're Through)" by Sparky D
- "Roxanne's Doctor—The Real Man" by Dr. Freshh
- "Do the Roxanne" by Dr. Rocx & Co.
- "The Parents of Roxanne" by Gigolo Tony & Lacey Lace
- "I'm Lil Roxanne" by Tanganyika
- "Yo, My Little Sister (Roxanne's Brothers)" by Crush Groove (Note: No connection to Krush Groove.)
- "Rappin' Roxy: Roxanne's Sister" by D.W. and the Party Crew (featuring Roxy)
- "Ice Roxanne" by Little Ice
- "Roxanne's a Man (The Untold Story—Final Chapter)" by Ralph Rolle

The clash between U.T.F.O. and Shante continued in the midst of the trend. Shante released the record "Bite This", which accused U.T.F.O. of copying her style on "The Real Roxanne", and U.T.F.O. released "Roxanne, Roxanne, Pt. 2: Calling Her a Crab", likening Shante to an ape and a crab. Shante's final record of the Roxanne Wars, titled "Queen of Rox (Shante Rox On)", recaps her feud with U.T.F.O. and highlights her skills as a rapper. The Roxanne Wars mostly ended with the 1985 release of "The Final Word—No More Roxanne (Please)" by the East Coast Crew, who pled for artists to cease the trend.

== Legacy ==
The Roxanne Wars helped solidify the careers of multiple rappers, especially those of Roxanne Shante, the Real Roxanne and Sparky D.

In 2017, a musical drama film about Shante's life, Roxanne Roxanne, was released.
