= Girls Town (soundtrack) =

Soundtrack album by various artists
- Released: August 20, 1996
- Recorded: 1992–1996
- Genres: Hip hop; alternative rock
- Label: Mercury
- Producers: Auto; Booga Bear; David Wynn; Dez Dottin; Flood; Geoff Barrow; John Parish; Jonny Dollar; Kate Schellenbach; KayGee; Lamb; Marley Marl; Mufi; Neneh Cherry; Nikke Nicole; N.O. Joe; PJ Harvey; Sir Jinx; The Superfreaks

Professional ratings
Review scores
Source	Rating
Allmusic	link

Girls Town is the soundtrack to the 1996 film, Girls Town. It was released on August 20, 1996 through Mercury Records and was made up of half hip hop and half alternative rock, each song performed by female artists.

== Track listing ==
1. "Sista" (Tyte)
2. "And I Say" (Suga)
3. "Somma Time Man" (Salt-n-Pepa)
4. "I Can't Take No More" (Yo-Yo)
5. "The Path" (Nefertiti)
6. "Somedays" (Neneh Cherry)
7. "Biggest Part of Me" (Bahamadia)
8. "Strongman" (Luscious Jackson)
9. "Gorecki" (Lamb)
10. "Maniac" (PJ Harvey)
11. "Thin Line" (Roxanne Shanté)
12. "U.N.I.T.Y." (Queen Latifah)
