= Street Sounds Hip Hop Electro 11 =

Compilation album by various artists
- Released: 1986
- Genre: Electro music, old school hip hop
- Label: StreetSounds

Street Sounds Hip Hop Electro 11 is the eleventh compilation album in a series and was released 1986 on the StreetSounds label. The album was released on LP and cassette and contains ten electro music and old school hip hop tracks mixed by The Frog and Mad Dog Harris.

== Track listing ==
Side one
No.	Title	Artist	Length
1.	"Def Fresh Crew"	Roxanne Shanté	-:--
2.	"Monster Beat"	Awesome Foursome	-:--
3.	"You Stink"	Captain Rock	-:--
4.	"Get Busy"	Disco Four	-:--
5.	"Success Is The Word"	12:41	-:--

Side two
No.	Title	Artist	Length
1.	"Girls - Part 2"	B Boys	-:--
2.	"Just Say Stet"	Stetsonic	-:--
3.	"What I Like"	2 Live Crew	-:--
4.	"Primrose Path"	Hashim	-:--
5.	"Butt Naked"	Dr. Jeckyll & Mr. Hyde	-:--
