= Sparky D =

American rapper (1965–2026)

- Sparky D, c. 1985

Background information
- Also known as: Sparky Dee; MC Sparky Dee; MC Sparky D
- Born: Doreen C. Broadnax; June 2, 1965; Brooklyn, New York City, U.S.
- Died: July 4, 2026 (aged 61)
- Genre: Hip-hop
- Occupation: Emcee
- Instrument: Vocals
- Years active: 1982–1990; 2015–2026
- Labels: NIA; Sutra

Doreen C. Broadnax (June 2, 1965 – July 4, 2026), known professionally as Sparky D, or alternatively as Sparky Dee, was an American hip-hop musician and rapper. She is noted as one of the first female battle rappers, first gaining attention through the Roxanne Wars when she responded to Roxanne Shanté's "Roxanne's Revenge" with "Sparky's Turn (Roxanne, You're Through)" in 1985.

== Early life ==
Doreen C. Broadnax was born on June 2, 1965 in Brooklyn, New York City to a white mother and a Black American father. Broadnax was raised in the Van Dyke Housing Projects in the Brownsville neighborhood.

== Career ==
Broadnax began her music career around 1983 when she formed The Playgirls, a local battle rap group with City Slim and Mo Ski. After she joined the group, The Playgirls recorded "Our Picture of a Man" for Sutra Records in 1983, which was later released in 1984. During her time with the group, Broadnax was introduced to rapper and music producer Duane Hughes, known professionally as Spyder-D. Broadnax and Hughes then entered into a romantic relationship. At age 18, Broadnax was hired as A&R for Hughes.

In 1984, 14-year-old rapper Roxanne Shanté released "Roxanne's Revenge", a response to U.T.F.O.'s record "Roxanne, Roxanne", a song about a woman who would not respond to their advances. After listening to Shanté's song on WBLS's Mr. Magic's Rap Attack on New Year's Eve 1985, Spyder-D decided that Broadnax would respond to Shanté's record the following day. Taking offense to Shanté's attack on a fellow Brooklyn crew, Broadnax responded with "Sparky's Turn (Roxanne You're Through)" under the NIA Records label; it was produced by Spyder-D. The single sold more than 300,000 copies within days of its release, later becoming certified gold.

The aforementioned single kicked off the Roxanne Wars, a well-known series of hip hop rivalries during the mid–1980s, yielding perhaps the most answer records in history. In 1985, capitalizing off the success of both records, Roxanne Shanté and Broadnax released "Round One, Roxanne Shanté vs. Sparky Dee" on Spin Records which included a battle track, in which the two rappers freestyle and diss each other. In subsequent years, Broadnax released a few tracks including "He's My DJ"/"She's So Def" with Kool DJ Red Alert in 1985 and "Throwdown" in 1987. Broadnax released her debut solo studio album in 1988, This is Sparky D's World, through B-Boy Records. The album failed to achieve major commercial success, and Broadnax soon became addicted to crack cocaine. Broadnax and Hughes ended their relationship in 1989. In 1998, Broadnax married a fellow addict; her husband was physically abusive and at one point Broadnax had to receive stitches on her head. Broadnax later converted to Apostolic Pentecostalism, divorced her abusive husband, became sober, and moved to Atlanta. There, she founded Treasure Ministries, a faith-based organization, and worked as an EMT and CNA.

Broadnax continued to stay active in the hip-hop community, working with various old-school artists on records, including MC Shy D, Spyder D, Roxanne Shanté, Kool DJ Red Alert, and K Wiz.

== Personal life and death ==
In 2017, Broadnax was portrayed by Cheryse Dyllan in the Netflix movie Roxanne, Roxanne, a biopic about the life of Roxanne Shanté.

Sparky D died on July 4, 2026, at the age of 61.
