= Dana Canedy =

American journalist, author, publisher, and Pulitzer Prize winner and administrator

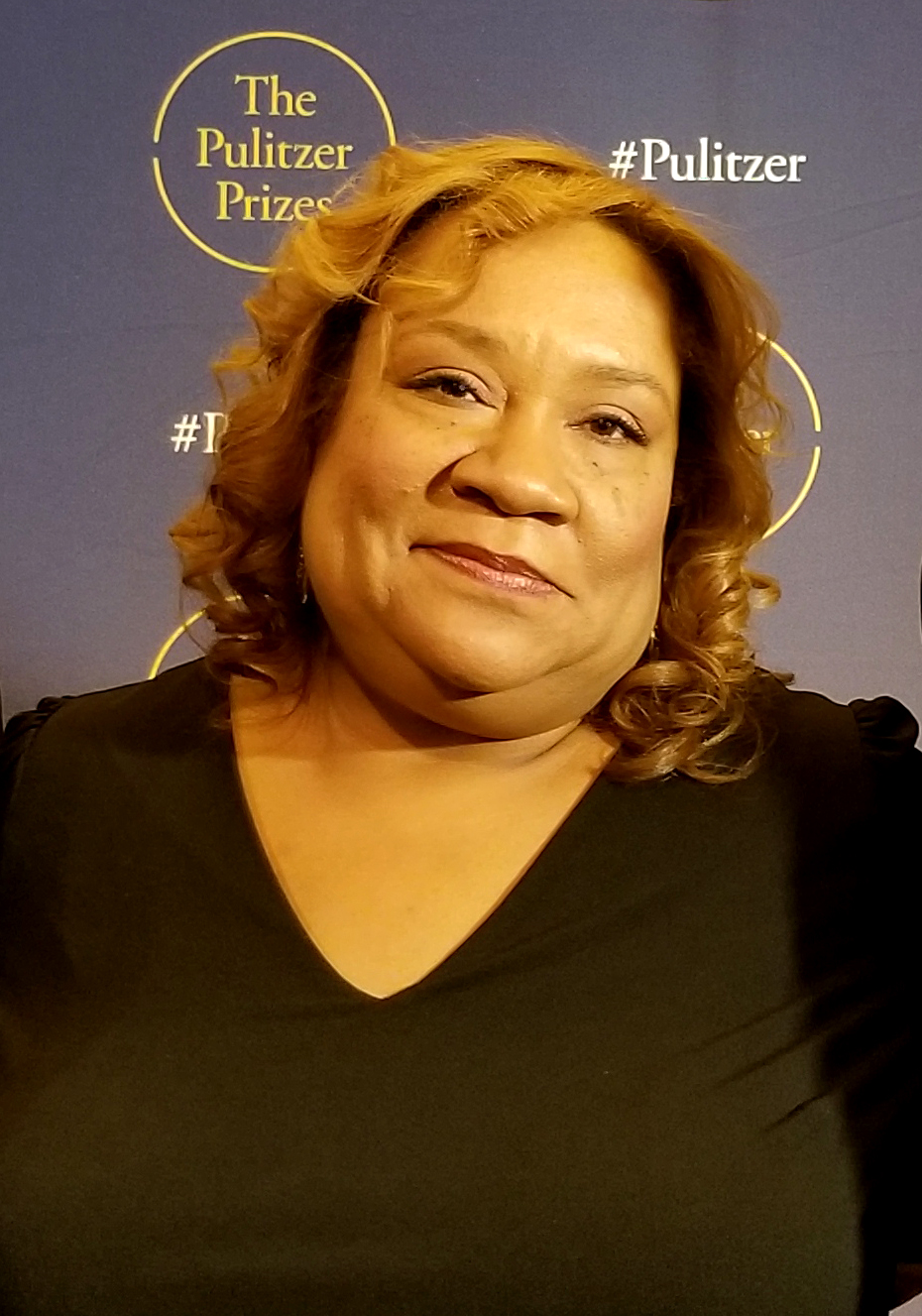
- Canedy in 2018
- Born: June 8, 1965 (age 61); Indianapolis, Indiana, U.S.
- Education: University of Kentucky (B.A.)
- Occupations: Journalist, publishing executive
- Notable work: A Journal for Jordan
- Children: 1

Dana Canedy (born June 8, 1965) is an American journalist, author, editor, and publishing executive who worked at the New York Times for over 20 years, winning a Pulitzer Prize in 2001. She served as the first African American and first woman administrator of the Pulitzer Prizes, a position she held from 2017 to 2020, and as the first African American to head a "major publishing imprint", as senior vice president and publisher of Simon & Schuster's flagship eponymous imprint from 2020 to 2022.

Canedy is currently the managing editor of Guardian US, a position she has held since 2023.

== Early life ==
Canedy was born in Indianapolis and grew up in Radcliff, Kentucky, near Fort Knox, in a military family. She graduated from the University of Kentucky and worked at The Palm Beach Post and The Plain Dealer before joining The New York Times in 1996. She was named a senior editor at The New York Times in 2006.

== Career ==
She is co-author of the series "How Race Is Lived in America", which won a Pulitzer Prize in 2001. Canedy's segment in the series, "The Hurt Between the Lines: A Newsroom Divides After a Healing Series on Race," focused on the similar yet divergent paths of two award-winning columnists, one white, one black, from the Akron Beacon-Journal.

She is the author of the memoir A Journal for Jordan: A Story of Love and Honor (2008), which grew out of an essay she wrote for The New York Times about the death of her fiancé, United States Army First Sergeant Charles Monroe King, in the Iraq War and the journal he left for their son. In a 2009 interview, Canedy said: "I needed to do something with my grief, after Charles died, something productive." In January 2018, Sony Pictures hired Academy Award-nominated writer Virgil Williams (Mudbound) to adapt Canedy's book into a film directed and co-produced by Denzel Washington. The resulting film, A Journal for Jordan, was released on Christmas Day, 2021, to mixed reviews.

In August 2017, Canedy became administrator of the Pulitzer Prizes at Columbia University, the first woman and first person of color to hold the position. As Pulitzer Prize administrator, Canedy said the organization would do more to defend press freedom, "especially at a time when the news media is under extraordinary assault." On May 30, 2018, she oversaw the annual awards luncheon at Columbia, telling Kendrick Lamar (the first non-classical, non-jazz musician to win the Pulitzer Prize for Music) that "we're both making history this year."

Canedy lives in New York City.
