= All Is Vanity (film) =

- Official poster
- Directed by: Marcos Mereles
- Written by: Marcos Mereles
- Produced by: Marcos Mereles
- Starring: Sid Phoenix; Yaseen Aroussi; Isabelle Bonfrer; Rosie Steel; Christopher Sherwood
- Cinematography: Murat Ersahin
- Edited by: Damian Tetelbaum
- Music by: Tristan Seewer
- Production company: Malbec Films
- Distributed by: Verve Pictures
- Release dates: 11 October 2021 (BFI); 14 October 2022 (United Kingdom)
- Running time: 72 minutes
- Country: United Kingdom
- Language: English

All Is Vanity is a 2021 British fantasy-mystery film written, produced and directed by Marcos Mereles in his directorial debut. It stars Sid Phoenix, Yaseen Aroussi, Isabelle Bonfrer, Rosie Steel and Christopher Sherwood.

The film premiered at the BFI London Film Festival on 11 October 2021, and received a limited theatrical release in the United Kingdom on 14 October 2022, by Verve Pictures.

== Premise ==
An eccentric photographer, his eager assistant, a make-up artist and a model gather for a fashion shoot in a London warehouse. But when one of their number disappears, events take a turn for the bizarre.

== Cast ==
- Sid Phoenix as The Photographer
- Yaseen Aroussi as The Intern
- Isabelle Bonfrer as The Model
- Rosie Steel as The Makeup Artist
- Christopher Sherwood as The Film Director

== Release ==
All Is Vanity had its world premiere at the 65th BFI London Film Festival on 11 October 2021.

Verve Pictures acquired distribution rights to the film for the UK and Ireland. It was released in select cinemas on 14 October 2022.

== Reception ==
The Upcoming gave the film 4 out of 5 stars, praising it as a "fascinating" surreal tale thanks to "the strength of its talented cast, stylish cinematography and self-aware script". Empire described it as "a mystery that unravels like nesting dolls", while Total Film called it a "deftly built farce".

=== Accolades ===
Award	Date of ceremony	Category	Recipient(s)	Result	Ref.
BFI London Film Festival	17 October 2021	Audience Award	All Is Vanity	Nominated	
Capri Hollywood International Film Festival	2 January 2023	Capri Special Award for Best Feature Film	All Is Vanity	Nominated	
Fargo Film Festival	25 March 2023	Best Narrative Feature	All Is Vanity	Nominated	
New Renaissance Film Festival	1 October 2023	Best Feature Film	All Is Vanity	Nominated	
New Renaissance Film Festival	1 October 2023	Best Director	Marcos Mereles	Won	
New Renaissance Film Festival	1 October 2023	Best Ensemble Cast	Sid Phoenix, Yaseen Aroussi, Isabelle Bonfrer, Rosie Steel, Christopher Sherwood	Won	
