= The Bitch Is Back (Roxanne Shanté album) =

Studio album by Shanté
- Released: October 5, 1992
- Recorded: 1991–1992
- Studio: Power Play Studios (Long Island City, NY); Libra Digital Sound (Queens, NY); I.N.S. Studios (New York, NY); Chung King Studios (New York, NY)
- Genre: Hip-hop
- Length: 42:55
- Label: Livin' Large/Tommy Boy
- Producer: Grand Daddy I.U.; Grandmaster Flash; Kool G Rap; Large Professor; Mister Cee; Trackmasters

Shanté chronology
Bad Sister (1989)	The Bitch Is Back (1992)	Greatest Hits (1995)

Professional ratings
Review scores
Source	Rating
AllMusic	4/5 stars
Robert Christgau	A−
Spin Alternative Record Guide	8/10

The Bitch Is Back is the second and final studio album by American rapper Roxanne Shanté. It was released on October 5, 1992, through Livin' Large Records with distribution via Tommy Boy Records. Recording sessions took place at Power Play Studios, Libra Digital Sound, I.N.S. Studios and Chung King Studios in New York. Production was handled by Kool G Rap, Mister Cee, Grand Daddy I.U., Large Professor, Grandmaster Flash and Trackmasters. It features a lone guest appearance from Kool G Rap.

== Track listing ==
No.	Title	Writer(s)	Producer(s)	Length
1.	"Intro"	Calvin LaBurn	Mister Cee	4:09
2.	"Deadly Rhymes" (featuring Kool G Rap)	Nathaniel Wilson; William Paul Mitchell; Benny Carter	Kool G Rap; Large Professor	2:57
3.	"Big Mama"	Lolita Gooden; Ayyub Cave	Grand Daddy I.U.; Kay Cee (co.)	5:15
4.	"Trick or Treat"	Wilson	Kool G Rap	3:17
5.	"Gotta Be Free"	Joseph Saddler; Tracey Horton; Hank Redd; Nathan Watts; Deniece Williams; Susaye Greene	Grandmaster Flash	4:25
6.	"Dance to This"	Cave; Gene McFadden; John Whitehead; Victor Carstarphen; Leon Huff	Grand Daddy I.U.; Kay Cee (co.)	4:40
7.	"Yes, Yes, Y'all"	LaBurn; Duval Clear	Mister Cee	4:30
8.	"Straight Razor"	Jean-Claude Olivier; Samuel Barnes; Wilson	Trackmasters	4:13
9.	"Shanté Gets Wicked"	LaBurn; Clear	Mister Cee	4:34
10.	"Brothers Ain't Shit"	Gooden; Wilson; Mitchell	Kool G Rap; Large Professor	4:55
Total length:				42:55

Sample credits

- Track 2 contains samples from "Buck and the Preacher" written by Benny Carter and performed by New Birth.
- Track 5 contains sample from "Wanna Be Free" written by Henry Reed, Nathan Watts, Deniece Williams and Susaye Greene and performed by Deniece Williams.
- Track 6 contains sample from "Don't Let Love Get You Down" written by Gene McFadden, John Whitehead, Victor Carstarphen and Leon Huff.
