= Marcos Mereles =

Argentine filmmaker

- Born: Argentina
- Citizenship: Argentine; Italian; British
- Occupations: Film director; Screenwriter; Producer
- Notable work: All Is Vanity

Marcos Mereles is an Argentine filmmaker based primarily in London, England, best known for his feature film debut All Is Vanity.

== Career ==
Mereles’ short films have been screened at festivals such as Nashville Film Festival, Cleveland Film Festival, Manchester Film Festival, East End Film Festival, and Fantasia Film Festival, among others. His short film De Dode Spreekt was also nominated for a Méliès d'Argent at the 33rd Imagine Film Festival in Amsterdam.

His feature debut, All Is Vanity, premiered at the 65th BFI London Film Festival. The film received a limited theatrical release in the United Kingdom in 2022.

=== Influences ===
Mereles participated in the 2022 Sight and Sound Directors' Poll. Held every ten years to select the greatest films of all time, contemporary directors were asked to select ten films of their choice, his selections were: 8½ (1963), 2001: A Space Odyssey (1968), Pulp Fiction (1994), GoodFellas (1990), Amarcord (1973), Last Year at Marienbad (1961), Barry Lyndon (1975), Eraserhead (1977), Citizen Kane (1941) and There Will Be Blood (2007).

== Filmography ==
=== Film ===
Directed features
Year	Title	Distributor
2021	All Is Vanity	Verve Pictures

=== Short films ===
- Nevezuchiy (2019)
- De Dode Spreekt (2017)
- Florinda e Floriana (2017)
- Nochebuena (2016)

== Awards and nominations ==
Year	Award	Category	Film	Result	Ref.
2023	Fargo Film Festival	Best Narrative Feature	All Is Vanity	Nominated	
2023	Capri Hollywood International Film Festival	Capri Special Award for Best Feature	All Is Vanity	Nominated	
2023	New Renaissance Film Festival	Best Director	All Is Vanity	Won	
2021	BFI London Film Festival	Audience Award	All Is Vanity	Nominated	
2020	Cleveland Film Festival	FilmSlam Competition Award	Nevezuchiy	Nominated	
2018	Fantasia Film Festival	International Short Film Competition	De Dode Spreekt	Nominated	
2018	Nashville Film Festival	Graveyard Shift Competition Award	De Dode Spreekt	Nominated	
2018	UK Film Festival	Best Short Film	De Dode Spreekt	Nominated	
2018	Indianapolis Film Festival	World Cinema Award	De Dode Spreekt	Nominated	
2018	Manchester Film Festival	Best Experimental Film	De Dode Spreekt	Won	
2018	Fantaspoa Festival	Best International Short Film	De Dode Spreekt	Nominated	
2017	Imagine Film Festival	Méliès d'Argent Award	De Dode Spreekt	Nominated	
