= Roxanne Roxanne =

2017 film

- Poster
- Directed by: Michael Larnell
- Written by: Michael Larnell
- Produced by: Nina Yang Bongiovi; Mimi Valdes; Forest Whitaker; Pharrell Williams
- Starring: Chanté Adams; Mahershala Ali; Nia Long; Elvis Nolasco; Kevin Phillips; Shenell Edmonds
- Cinematography: Federico Cesca
- Edited by: Claudia Castello
- Music by: RZA
- Production companies: I am OTHER; Significant Productions
- Distributed by: Netflix
- Release dates: January 22, 2017 (Sundance); March 23, 2018 (US)
- Running time: 100 minutes
- Country: United States
- Language: English

Roxanne Roxanne is a 2017 American musical drama film written and directed by Michael Larnell. It stars Chanté Adams, Mahershala Ali, Nia Long, Elvis Nolasco, Kevin Phillips, and Shenell Edmonds. The film revolves around the life of rapper Roxanne Shante. It was screened in the U.S. Dramatic Competition section of the 2017 Sundance Film Festival. Adams won the Breakthrough Performance Award at the Sundance Film Festival.

== Cast ==
- Chanté Adams as Roxanne Shante
  - Taliyah Whitaker as young Roxanne
- Mahershala Ali as Cross
- Nia Long as Peggy
- Elvis Nolasco as Ray
- Kevin Phillips as Marley Marl
- Shenell Edmonds as Ranita
- Arnstar as MC Shan
- Nigel A. Fullerton as Biz Markie
- Tremaine Brown Jr. as Nasir
- Cheryse Dyllan as Sparky Dee
- Charlie Hudson III as Mr. Magic
- Cindy Cheung as Nurse Mitchell
- Sean Ringgold as Keith
- Nelsan Ellis as Mr. Lester
- Curtiss Cook as Dave

== Release ==
In January 2017, it was Neon had acquired North American distribution rights to the film in a bidding war that also included Amazon Studios, Lionsgate and Miramax. However, in December 2017, the film was revealed to be part of Netflix's 2018 film slate.

=== Critical reception ===
On review aggregator website Rotten Tomatoes, the film holds an approval rating of 70% based on 30 reviews, and an average rating of 6/10. The website's critical consensus reads, "Roxanne Roxanne belatedly honors its subject with a gripping character-driven biopic that serves as a primer for a trailblazing career while telling an often tragic story." On Metacritic, the film has a weighted average score of 74 out of 100, based on ten critics, indicating "generally favorable reviews".

On RogerEbert.com, Nick Allen gave the film 2 stars. Comparing the movie to David O. Russell's Joy, he said: "Like Joy, this story feels overwhelmingly like the writer/director's version of their subject's lives, rendering Roxanne Roxanne a portrait that's as expressive as it is incomplete."

== See also ==
- List of black films of the 2010s
