= Roxanne's Revenge =

1984 single by Roxanne Shante

Single by Roxanne Shante
- B-side: "Roxanne's Revenge (Vocal)"
- Released: 1984
- Recorded: 1984
- Genre: Golden age hip hop
- Length: 4:20
- Label: Pop Art Records
- Songwriters: Lolita Shanté Gooden, UTFO, Full Force
- Producer: Marley Marl

Roxanne Shante singles chronology
"Roxanne's Revenge" (1984)	"Runaway" (1985)

Music video
- "Roxanne's Revenge" on YouTube

"Roxanne's Revenge" is the debut single by American hip-hop emcee Roxanne Shante. It was produced by a then-unknown Marley Marl and released in 1984 on the independent label Pop Art Records. In the song, a 14-year-old Roxanne Shanté, whose real name is Lolita Shanté Gooden, responds to UTFO's hit song "Roxanne, Roxanne". In addition to her feud with UTFO, this also caused between 30 and more than 100 answer songs from different hip hop artists to be produced at that time (according to different statements), in what would be called the Roxanne Wars.

The song spent 12 weeks on the Billboard R&B singles chart, reaching No. 22 in March 1985 and becoming Shanté's most successful song as the lead artist on that chart. "Roxanne's Revenge" sold more than 250,000 copies in the New York area alone.

The song also bubbled under the Billboard Hot 100 at no. 109.

"Roxanne's Revenge" is frequently regarded as one of rap's best diss tracks, both of the 1980s and in general.

== Background ==
Roxanne's revenge is regarded as an inspiration for emcee Nicki Minaj’s song “Roman's Revenge.” “Roxanne's Revenge” was the first female hip-hop diss track.

== Single track listing ==
=== 12" Vinyl ===
==== A-Side ====
1. Street version (4:20)
2. Street version (Instrumental) (4:31)

==== B-Side ====
1. Radio version (4:52)
2. Radio version (instrumental) (5:01)

== Personnel ==
- Marley Marl—producer
- Elai Turbo—engineer
- Gooden, UTFO, Full Force—songwriters
