= Bad Sister (album) =

Studio album by Roxanne Shanté
- Released: October 20, 1989
- Genre: Hip hop
- Length: 58:52
- Labels: Cold Chillin'/Reprise; 25809; Cold Chillin'/Breakout/A&M; 399 013 (U.K., Ireland)
- Producer: Marley Marl

Roxanne Shanté chronology
Bad Sister (1989)	The Bitch Is Back (1992)

Professional ratings
Review scores
Source	Rating
AllMusic	2.5/5 stars
Chicago Tribune	2/4 stars
Robert Christgau	A−
The Encyclopedia of Popular Music	3/5 stars
Rolling Stone	4/5 stars
The Rolling Stone Album Guide	4/5 stars
Spin Alternative Record Guide	9/10

Bad Sister is the debut album by Roxanne Shanté, released in 1989 on Cold Chillin' Records. The album peaked at No. 52 on the Top R&B/Hip-Hop Albums chart.

== Production ==
Bad Sister was produced by Marley Marl. Big Daddy Kane contributed lyrics to a couple of the album's songs. In Rolling Stone, Chuck Eddy said the album's "homemade double-entendre slang gets as nasty as its beat. That beat – which Marley Marl's mix thickens house style with up-to-the-minute boogie piano, Shaft-derived wah-wah, dub echo, frat-party noise and horny horns – just couldn't be nastier."

== Critical reception ==
The New York Times wrote that the songs "combine humor and raw rhythmic power with Ms. Shante's sturdy sense of identity ... [they] proves she's tougher and wittier than the competition." Trouser Press thought that "Shanté has a cute, coy voice that takes on an authoritative edge when she kicks into high gear." The Spin Alternative Record Guide called Bad Sister "a true hip-hop masterpiece" and a "definitive Cold Chillin' album." USA Today praised the "hilarious, sometimes risque stories."

In 2022, Rolling Stone placed Bad Sister at number 175 on their list of the 200 Greatest Hip-Hop Albums of All Time. The magazine's writer Charles Aaron said, "Her old-school playground sass, pitiless flow, and casually eviscerating wit turned songs like "Bad Sister," "Live on Stage," "Have a Nice Day," and "Go on Girl" into giddy celebrations."

== Track listing ==
1. "Bad Sister" (D. Clear, M. Williams)—5:00
2. "Live on Stage" (N. Wilson, M. Williams)—6:57
3. "Independent Woman" (D. Clear, M. Williams)—4:35
4. "Knockin' Hiney" (L. Gooden, C. Curry, K. Coaxum, M. Williams)—3:36
5. "My Groove Gets Better" (K. Coaxum, M. Williams)—3:30
6. "Feelin' Kinda Horny" (J. Loving, P. Bourke)—4:10
7. "Have a Nice Day" (remix) (A. Hardy, M. Williams)—3:21
8. "Let's Rock, Y'all" (L. Gooden, M. Williams)—4:17
9. "Fatal Attraction" (D. Clear, M. Williams)—4:28
10. "Wack Itt (Remix)" (L. Gooden, M. Williams, A. Booth)—6:00
11. "Skeezer" (A. Hardy, M. Williams)—2:45
12. "What's on Your Mind" (R. Diggs Hamlian, M. Williams)—3:20
13. "Go On, Girl (Remix)" (A. Hardy, M. Williams)—5:01
14. "Gotta Get Paid" (featuring Craig G) (L. Gooden, M. Williams)—1:52

== Personnel ==
- Producer: Marley Marl except "Feelin' Kinda Horny" produced by Jae Supreme & Q. Neighbor
- Mixing: Marley Marl except "Feelin' Kinda Horny" mixed by Jae Supreme & Q. Neighbor
- Assistant engineers: Leon Lee, Thomas on Time, and Clash
- Engineer: Jae Supreme and Richard Joseph on "Feelin' Kinda Horny"
- Remixing: C.J. Mackintosh and David Dorrell on "Live on Stage"
- Art Direction and Design: JoDee Stringham
- Photography: George DuBose
- Album Coordinator: Kelly Haley

== Charts ==
Chart (1989)	Peak position
US Top R&B/Hip-Hop Albums (Billboard)	52
