= Roxanne Shante =

American rapper (born 1969)

Roxanne Shanté
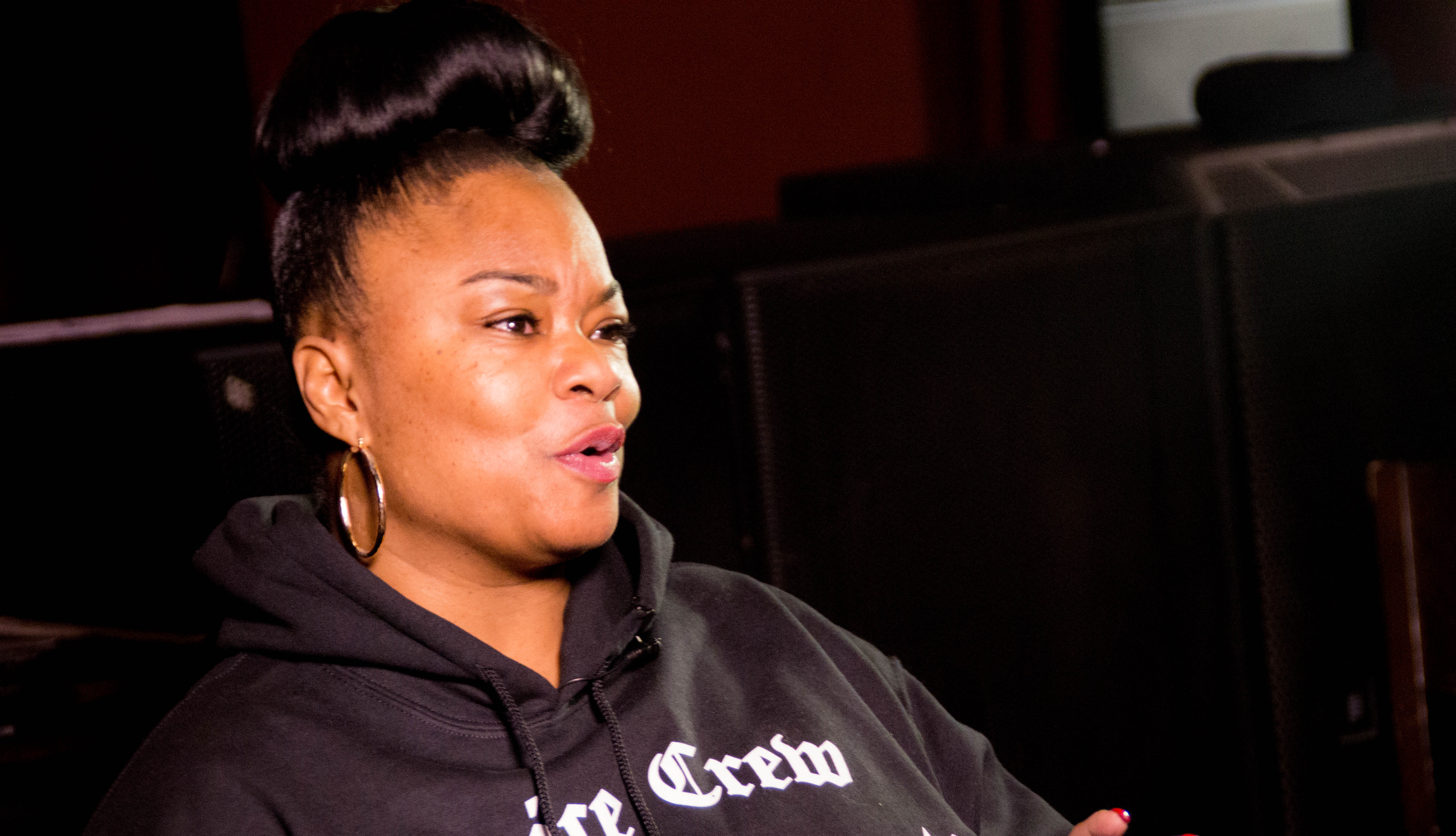
- Shante in 2016

Background information
- Born: Lolita Shanté Gooden; March 8, 1970 (age 56); Queens, New York City, U.S.
- Genre: Hip-hop
- Occupation: Rapper
- Years active: 1984–1996; 2008–present
- Labels: Pop Art; 10/Virgin (Ireland, UK); Breakout/A&M; Cold Chillin'/Reprise/Warner Bros.; Livin' Large/Tommy Boy
- Formerly of: Juice Crew

Lolita Shanté Gooden (born 1970), better known by her stage name Roxanne Shanté, is an American rapper. She first gained attention in 1984 through the Roxanne Wars, and was part of the Juice Crew. The 2017 film Roxanne Roxanne is a dramatization of Shanté's life.

== Early life and career ==
Shanté was born March 8, 1970 in Queens, New York. In 1984, she met Mr. Magic and Marley Marl outside the Queensbridge housing project. They discussed U.T.F.O., since the rap trio had failed to make an appearance at a concert. U.T.F.O. had recently released a single called "Hanging Out", which did not gain much critical acclaim; however, the B-side "Roxanne, Roxanne", about a woman who would not respond to their advances, became a hit.

Shanté, who was a member of the Juice Crew, was contracted to write a track in rebuttal to U.T.F.O.'s rhyme, posing as the Roxanne in the U.T.F.O. song. Marley Marl produced the song "Roxanne's Revenge" using the original beats from an instrumental version of "Roxanne, Roxanne". The track became an instant hit and made Shanté, only 14 at the time, one of the first female MCs to become very popular. Then the "Roxanne Wars" started, and Shanté continued to rhyme and started touring with her producer, Marley Marl.

In 1985, Shanté released a record together with rapper Sparky D, who had earlier released a diss track about her called "Sparky's Turn (Roxanne, You're Through)". The record called "Round One, Roxanne Shanté vs Sparky Dee" was released by Spin Records and included six tracks: the two original battle tracks ("Roxanne's Revenge" and "Sparky's Turn") as well as "Roxanne's Profile" by Shante, "Sparky's Profile" by Sparky D and a battle track, in which the two emcees freestyle and dis each other, in a censored and an uncensored version. Other hits included "Have a Nice Day" and "Go on Girl".

In 1985, Shanté battled Busy Bee Starski for the title of best freestyle emcee but lost due to improper judging. Judge Kurtis Blow later admitted to Shanté that he did not vote for her because she was a girl. The ongoing battle with KRS-One hit its height when KRS-One claimed in his 1986 track "The Bridge is Over" that Shanté was nothing more than a sexual appendage to male rappers.

In 1988, she rhymed on the Rick James single Loosey's Rap.

In 1989, Shanté released Bad Sister, The Bitch Is Back in 1992, and a greatest hits anthology in 1995. In 1997, Roxanne was featured on Frankie Cutlass third single, titled "The Cypher Part III," which featured Marley Marl's juice crew emcees Big Daddy Kane, Big Markie, and Craig G.

== Hiatus ==
By the age of 25 Shanté was largely retired from the recording industry. She continued to make occasional guest appearances and live performances, as well as mentor young female hip-hop artists. She made a cameo appearance on VH1's hip hop reality show Ms. Rap Supreme, giving rap-battle strategies to the finalists of the show. She was in a series of Sprite commercials during the late 1990s. She returned to performing, and in 2008, her song "Roxanne's Revenge" was ranked number 42 on VH1's 100 Greatest Songs of Hip Hop. Shanté re-recorded the song in 2009. In an interview with EmEz in 2015, she said that she had just been proposed to and that she had previously been married. In the same interview, she said that KRS-One was one of her favorite rappers. Shanté, as of December 2025, hosts the daily show Have A Nice Day (on Rock The Bells, via SiriusXM).

== Biographical claims ==
It was reported by Blender in 2008, and more extensively in a New York Daily News account in 2009, that Shanté earned a bachelor's degree from Marymount Manhattan College and a master's and Ph.D in psychology from Cornell University. The articles said that a quirk in her recording contract obligated Warner Music to fund her college education. These were not new claims by Shanté; she spoke at length about them on the Beef II documentary which was released in 2004.

In 2009, an investigation by lawyer and journalist Ben Sheffner for Slate magazine found no evidence of Shanté's claims. She was never signed to a Warner Music label, but was under contract to the independent label Cold Chillin' Records, which was distributed by Reprise/Warner Bros. Records from 1987 to 1992. Academic records indicate that she attended only three months at Marymount Manhattan College. Shanté never earned a degree, and she is unlicensed by New York State officials to practice psychology or similar disciplines. The Daily News then ran a five-paragraph correction. Shanté apologized in November 2009.

== Roxanne Roxanne film ==
A dramatized biopic about Shanté’s life, Roxanne Roxanne, was first shown at the 2017 Sundance Film Festival. It received critical acclaim and the lead actress Chanté Adams won best breakout performance for her portrayal of Shanté. The film was co-produced by Forest Whitaker and Pharrell Williams. It was written and directed by Michael Larnell. It was bought by the film studio Neon for general release later in 2017.

== Legacy ==
At the height of her career, Shanté was referred to as the "Queen of Rap" by The New York Times and has been noted as a hip-hop pioneer. The Sunday Times credited her for popularizing diss tracks. Billboard editor Natalie Weiner wrote that Shanté's "blazingly male-shaming diss track" and "hip-hop's first recorded beef" helped move hip-hop further toward the mainstream, calling her "rap's first female star."

Consequence considered her "a mentor for generations of female MCs, and an early advocate in rap for female empowerment." In 1989, The Christian Science Monitor stated that the popularity of rappers like Roxanne Shanté, Salt-N-Pepa, and MC Lyte created a path for the next generation of female hip hop artists. In 2025, Shanté became the first solo female rap artist to receive the Grammy Lifetime Achievement Award and the second female hip-hop act in general after Salt-N-Pepa received it in 2021.

== Discography ==
=== Studio albums ===
- Bad Sister (1989)
- The Bitch Is Back (1992)
