= The One (Chubb Rock album) =

Studio album by Chubb Rock
- Released: May 14, 1991
- Genre: East Coast hip hop
- Length: 1:04:06
- Label: Select
- Producers: Chubb Rock; Howie Tee

Chubb Rock chronology
And the Winner Is... (1989)	The One (1991)	I Gotta Get Mine Yo! (Book of Rhymes) (1992)

Singles from The One
- 1. "Treat 'Em Right" Released: 1990; 2. "The Chubbster" Released: 1991; 3. "Just the Two of Us" Released: 1991; 4. "The Big Man" Released: 1992

Professional ratings
Review scores
Source	Rating
AllMusic	3/5 stars
RapReviews	8/10
The Source	4/5

The One is the third studio album by Jamaican-American rapper Chubb Rock. It was released on May 14, 1991, via Select Records. The album was produced by Howie Tee and Chubb Rock, with Trackmasters also working on the songs "Cat" and "Bring 'Em Home Safely". It features a guest appearance from 3rd Bass. The album peaked at number 71 on the Billboard 200 and number 13 on the Top R&B/Hip-Hop Albums in the United States.

It was supported with four singles: "Treat 'Em Right", "The Chubbster", "Just the Two of Us" and "The Big Man". Its lead single, "Treat 'Em Right", made it to number 95 on the Billboard Hot 100 and number 33 on the Hot R&B/Hip-Hop Songs. "The Chubbster", "Just the Two of Us" and "The Big Man" also made it to the Billboard Hot R&B/Hip-Hop Songs, reaching numbers 41, 20 and 96, respectively.

Five songs — "Treat 'Em Right", "What's the Word", "Organizer", "Keep It Street" and "The Regiments of Steel" — were previously released in 1990 extended play Treat 'Em Right.

== Track listing ==
No.	Title	Length
1.	"The One"	4:44
2.	"Just the Two of Us"	3:33
3.	"Treat 'Em Right"	4:43
4.	"The Big Man"	3:56
5.	"The Night Scene"	3:30
6.	"The Bad Boyz"	2:46
7.	"What's the Word"	3:59
8.	"Organizer"	3:22
9.	"The Chubbster"	3:56
10.	"Cat"	3:38
11.	"Another Statistic"	2:41
12.	"Enjoy Ya Self"	2:50
13.	"The Five Deadly Venoms"	3:49
14.	"Bring 'Em Home Safely" (featuring 3rd Bass, Rockin' Robin (The Lady of Rage))	5:22
15.	"Keep It Street"	2:39
16.	"The Regiments of Steel"	4:50
17.	"The Big Man (Remix)"	3:48
Total length:		1:04:06

== Charts ==
=== Weekly charts ===
Chart (1991)	Peak position
US Billboard 200	71
US Top R&B/Hip-Hop Albums (Billboard)	13

=== Year-end charts ===
Chart (1991)	Position
US Top R&B/Hip-Hop Albums (Billboard)	65
Chart (1992)	Position
US Top R&B/Hip-Hop Albums (Billboard)	97
