= The Hip Hop Box =

Compilation album by Various artists
- Released: April 20, 2004
- Genre: Hip hop
- Label: Hip-O
- Producer: Various

Professional ratings
Review scores
| Source | Rating |
|---|---|
| AllMusic | 3/5 stars |
| Blender | 4/5 stars |

The Hip Hop Box is a four-disc compilation of hip hop tracks, spanning from Sugarhill Gang's "Rapper's Delight" in 1979 to 50 Cent's "21 Questions" in 2003. The compilation has been criticized for song choice, but remains one of the most definitive collections in hip hop.

== Track listing - disc one ==
| # | Title | Artist | Producers | Original album |
|---|---|---|---|---|
| 1 | "Rapper's Delight" | Sugarhill Gang | Sylvia Robinson | "Rapper's Delight" 12" |
| 2 | "The Breaks" | Kurtis Blow | J.B. Moore, Robert Ford Jr. | Kurtis Blow |
| 3 | "The Body Rock" | Treacherous Three | Sylvia Robinson | "The Body Rock" 12" |
| 4 | "Planet Rock" | Afrika Bambaataa & The Soul Sonic Force | Arthur Baker | "Planet Rock" 12" |
| 5 | "The Message" | Grandmaster Flash & The Furious Five | Duke Bootee, Sylvia Robinson | The Message |
| 6 | "Sucker M.C.'s" | Run-D.M.C. | Russell Simmons, Larry Smith, Terrance Balfour | Run-D.M.C. |
| 7 | "Roxanne, Roxanne" | UTFO | Full Force | "Roxanne, Roxanne" 12" |
| 8 | "Roxanne's Revenge" | Roxanne Shante | Marley Marl | "Roxanne's Revenge" 12" |
| 9 | "Push It" | Salt-N-Pepa | Hurby Azor | Hot, Cool and Vicious |
| 10 | "Freaky Tales" | Too Short | Ted Bohanon, Todd Shaw | Born to Mack |
| 11 | "Wild Wild West" | Kool Moe Dee | Kool Moe Dee, Bryan "Chuck" New, LaVaba Mallison, Pete Q. Harris, Teddy Riley | How Ya Like Me Now |

== Track listing - disc two ==
| # | Title | Artist | Producers | Original album |
|---|---|---|---|---|
| 1 | "Follow The Leader" | Eric B. & Rakim | Eric B. & Rakim | Follow The Leader |
| 2 | "My Philosophy" | Boogie Down Productions | KRS-One | By All Means Necessary |
| 3 | "I'm Your Pusher" | Ice-T | Ice-T, Afrika Islam | Power |
| 4 | "Turn This Mutha Out" | MC Hammer | MC Hammer, Felton Pilate | Let's Get It Started |
| 5 | "Fight the Power" | Public Enemy | The Bomb Squad | Do the Right Thing OST |
| 6 | "Me So Horny" | 2 Live Crew | 2 Live Crew | As Nasty as They Wanna Be |
| 7 | "Just A Friend" | Biz Markie | Biz Markie | The Biz Never Sleeps |
| 8 | "Buddy (song)" | De La Soul, Jungle Brothers, A Tribe Called Quest, Queen Latifah, Monie Love | Prince Paul, De La Soul | 3 Feet High and Rising |
| 9 | "The Gas Face" | 3rd Bass, Zev Love X | Prince Paul, 3rd Bass | The Cactus Album |
| 10 | "I Left My Wallet In El Segundo" | A Tribe Called Quest | A Tribe Called Quest | People's Instinctive Travels and the Paths of Rhythm |
| 11 | "Looking at the Front Door" | Main Source | Main Source | Breaking Atoms |
| 12 | "Treat 'Em Right" | Chubb Rock | Howie Tee | The One |

== Track listing - disc three ==
| # | Title | Artist | Producers | Original album |
|---|---|---|---|---|
| 1 | "O.P.P." | Naughty by Nature | Naughty by Nature | Naughty by Nature |
| 2 | "Summertime" | DJ Jazzy Jeff & the Fresh Prince | K. Fingers, Hula, Roland Edison | Homebase |
| 3 | "Tonite" | DJ Quik | DJ Quik | Quik Is the Name |
| 4 | "The Choice Is Yours (Revisited)" | Black Sheep | Black Sheep | A Wolf In Sheep's Clothing |
| 5 | "Tennessee" | Arrested Development | Speech | 3 Years, 5 Months and 2 Days in the Life Of... |
| 6 | "They Reminisce Over You (T.R.O.Y.)" | Pete Rock & CL Smooth | Pete Rock | Mecca and the Soul Brother |
| 7 | "Rebirth of Slick (Cool Like Dat)" | Digable Planets | Butterfly | Reachin' (A New Refutation of Time and Space) |
| 8 | "Passin' Me By" | The Pharcyde | J-Swift, L.A. Jay | Bizarre Ride II the Pharcyde |
| 9 | "Slam" | Onyx | Chyskillz, Jam Master Jay | Bacdafucup |
| 10 | "U.N.I.T.Y." | Queen Latifah | KayGee | Black Reign |
| 11 | "C.R.E.A.M." | Wu-Tang Clan | RZA | Enter the Wu-Tang (36 Chambers) |
| 12 | "Regulate" | Warren G, Nate Dogg | Warren G | Regulate... G Funk Era |
| 13 | "Flava in Ya Ear" | Craig Mack | Easy Mo Bee | Project: Funk da World |
| 14 | "I'll Be There for You/You're All I Need to Get By" | Method Man, Mary J. Blige | RZA, Puff Daddy, Trackmasters | Tical |

== Track listing - disc four ==
| # | Title | Artist | Producers | Original album |
|---|---|---|---|---|
| 1 | "How High (Remix)" | Method Man, Redman | Erick Sermon | The Show (Original Soundtrack) |
| 2 | "Get Money" | Junior M.A.F.I.A., The Notorious B.I.G. | EZ Elpee | Conspiracy |
| 3 | "Tha Crossroads" | Bone Thugs-n-Harmony | DJ U-Neek | E. 1999 Eternal |
| 4 | "Smile" | Scarface, 2Pac | Scarface, Mike Dean, Tone Capone | The Untouchable |
| 5 | "Put Your Hands Where My Eyes Could See" | Busta Rhymes | Shamello, Buddah, Epitome | When Disaster Strikes... |
| 6 | "Luv 2 Luv U" | Timbaland & Magoo | Timbaland | Welcome To Our World |
| 7 | "You Know My Steez" | Gang Starr | DJ Premier | Moment of Truth |
| 8 | "Get at Me Dog" | DMX, Sheek Louch | Dame Grease | It's Dark and Hell Is Hot |
| 9 | "Superthug" | N.O.R.E. | The Neptunes | N.O.R.E. |
| 10 | "You Got Me" | The Roots, Jill Scott | The Grand Wizzards, Scott Storch | Things Fall Apart |
| 11 | "The Light (Remix)" | Common, Erykah Badu | Jay Dee | Bamboozled OST |
| 12 | "Until the End of Time" | 2Pac | Johnny "J", Trackmasters | Until the End of Time |
| 13 | "21 Questions" | 50 Cent, Nate Dogg | Dirty Swift | Get Rich or Die Tryin' |
| 14 | "The Next Episode" | Dr. Dre, Snoop Dogg | Dr. Dre, Mel-Man | 2001 |
