= Anthony Parker (disambiguation) =

Anthony Parker (born 1975) is an American retired basketball player.

Anthony Parker may also refer to:

== Sports ==
- Tony Parker (born 1982), French-American former professional basketball player (NBA)
- Tony Parker (basketball, born 1993), American basketball player
- Tony Parker (rugby union) (born 1961), Australian rugby union player
- Anthony Parker (defensive back, born 1966), American football player for Arizona State and numerous NFL teams
- Anthony Parker (defensive back, born 1975), American football player for Weber State, San Francisco 49ers
- Anthony Parker (Canadian football) (born 1989), Canadian football player

== Other ==
- Anthony Parker (MP) (1657–1693), Member of Parliament (MP) for Clitheroe
- Tony Parker (author) (1923–1996), British oral historian
- Anthony Ray Parker (born 1958), American actor
- Anthony Parker (musician) (born 1980), American hip-hop artist and music label owner
