= The Best of Special Ed =

Greatest hits album by Special Ed
- Released: April 14, 2000
- Genre: Hip hop
- Producer: Howie Tee

Special Ed chronology
Revelations (1995)	The Best of Special Ed (2000)	Still Got It Made (2004)

Professional ratings
Review scores
Source	Rating
AllMusic	3/5 stars

The Best of Special Ed is the greatest hits album by the rapper Special Ed, released in 2000.

== Track listing ==
1. I Got It Made
2. Neva Go Back
3. Come On, Let's Move It
4. I'm the Magnificent (The Magnificent Remix)
5. Ready 2 Attack
6. The Mission
7. Freaky Flow
8. Think About It
9. I Got It Made (Businesslike Version)
10. Taxing
