= Treat 'Em Right (EP) =

EP by Chubb Rock
- Released: 1990
- Genre: Hip hop
- Label: Select
- Producer: Howie Tee

Chubb Rock chronology
And the Winner Is... (1989)	Treat 'Em Right (1990)	The One (1991)

Singles from Treat 'Em Right
- 1. "Treat 'Em Right" Released: 1991

Treat 'Em Right is the first extended play by Jamaican-American rapper Chubb Rock. It was released in 1990 via Select Records. The album was produced by Howie Tee and Chubb Rock. The EP peaked at number 73 on the Billboard 200 and number 22 on the Top R&B/Hip-Hop Albums charts in the United States. Its only single, "Treat 'Em Right", made it to number 95 on the Billboard Hot 100 and atop the Hot Rap Songs charts in the US and number 67 on the UK singles chart, as well as was featured in Freddy's Dead: The Final Nightmare soundtrack.

The first five songs from the EP were included on Chubb Rock's 1991 The One LP.

== Track listing ==
No.	Title	Writer(s)	Length
1.	"Treat 'Em Right"	Richard Simpson; Howard Thompson	4:44
2.	"Keep It Street"	Simpson	2:38
3.	"Regiments of Steel"	Simpson	4:39
4.	"What's the Word"	Simpson	4:00
5.	"The Organizer"	Simpson	3:20
6.	"Treat 'Em Right" (Cribb Mix)	Simpson; Thompson	4:41

== Personnel ==
- Richard "Chubb Rock" Simpson — vocals, co-producer
- Howard "Howie Tee" Thompson — producer, engineering, mixing
- Rick Essig — mastering
- Fred Munao — executive producer
- Peter Bodtke — photography

== Charts ==
Chart (1991)	Peak position
US Billboard 200	73
US Top R&B/Hip-Hop Albums (Billboard)	22
