= Legal (Special Ed album) =

Studio album by Special Ed
- Released: July 31, 1990
- Studios: Howie's Crib (New York, NY)
- Genre: Hip hop
- Length: 38:04
- Label: Profile
- Producers: Howie Tee; Special Ed; Wayne Archer

Special Ed chronology
Youngest in Charge (1989)	Legal (1990)	Revelations (1995)

Singles from Legal
- 1. "The Mission" Released: September 6, 1990; 2. "Come On, Let's Move It" Released: 1990

Professional ratings
Review scores
Source	Rating
AllMusic	3/5 stars
Select	3/5 medals

Legal is the second studio album by American rapper Special Ed. It was released on July 31, 1990, via Profile Records. The recording sessions took place at Howie's Crib in New York. The album was produced by Howie Tee, Wayne Archer, and Special Ed. It features guest appearances from 40-Love, Akshun, Coolie Man, Drew Archer, and Little Shawn. Two singles were released from the album, "Come On, Let's Move It" and "The Mission". It peaked at number 84 on the Billboard 200 albums chart in the United States.

== Track listing ==
All lyrics are written by Edward K. Archer.

No.	Title	Producer(s)	Length
1.	"Come On, Let's Move It"	Howie Tee	3:27
2.	"The Mission"	Tee	3:56
3.	"Ya Not So Hot"	Tee	3:54
4.	"I'm the Magnificent" (The Magnificent Remix)	Tee	4:12
5.	"I'm Special Ed"	Special Ed; Wayne Archer; Tee	4:05
6.	"Ya Wish Ya Could"	Special Ed; Wayne Archer	3:46
7.	"Ready 2 Attack"	Tee	3:35
8.	"5 Men and a Mic" (featuring 40-Love, Akshun, Coolie Man and Little Shawn)	Special Ed; Wayne Archer	4:42
9.	"Livin' Like a Star"	Tee	3:35
10.	"See It Ya" (featuring Drew Archer)	Special Ed; Wayne Archer	2:50
Total length:			38:04

== Charts ==
Chart (1990)	Peak position
US Billboard 200	84
US Top R&B/Hip-Hop Albums (Billboard)	15
