= Elsimar M. Coutinho =

Brazilian scientist (1930–2020)

Elsimar Metzker Coutinho (18 May 1930 – 17 August 2020) was a Brazilian scientist of Luso-Austrian descent, professor, gynecologist, television personality, and character named as "Prince of Itapoa", in the books of Jorge Amado which references the Coutinho family's land in Itapoa where Amado himself lived.

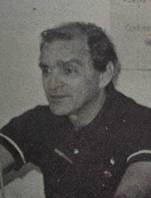

== Biography ==
Coutinho was born in Pojuca, the son of a landowner, politician and pharmacognosis professor of the Pharmacology School of Paraná (Escola de Farmácia do Paraná), who was appointed mayor of the municipality of Pojuca in the 1930s (during the military coup that placed Getulio Vargas, a civilian, in the presidency) and Mrs. Alaíde Metzker. Coutinho is also the brother of Senator Alaor Coutinho and the artist Riolan Coutinho. Coutinho triangulated between South America, North America and Europe on a regular basis.

Coutinho is a descendant of a branch of the Portuguese Coutinho family which settled lands in South America when they married into the family of Sebastião José de Carvalho e Melo, Marquis of Pombal."

Coutinho completed his early education in Pojuca, followed by high school at the Colégio Estadual da Bahia (Central). The family arrived in the city of Salvador when his father decided to develop a vast expanse of land in a neighbourhood of the city known as Itapoã, made famous by the books of Jorge Amado and the music of Dorival Caymmi. To this day the family still own large sections of the beachfront.

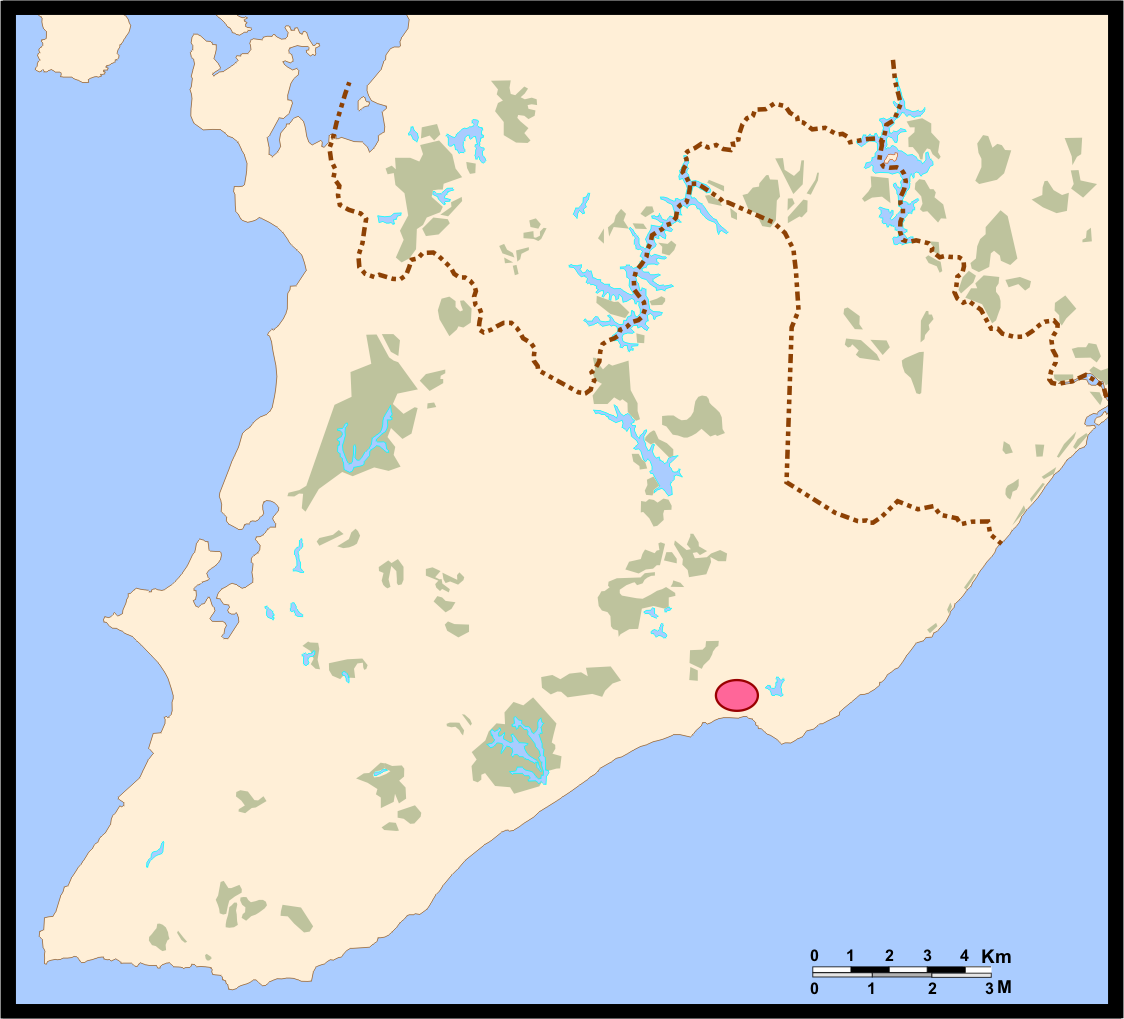
Location of Itapoã in Salvador.

The former Coutinho lands are the triangle between what is known today as Dorival Caymmi square to the Pedra do Sal, up to and including the Abaetê Lagoon. Later Coutinho studied pharmacy at the Faculdade de Farmácia e Bioquímica, graduating in 1951 followed by a course in medicine, completed in 1956, both at the Federal University of Bahia/UFBA.

Coutinho then attended a graduate course at the Sorbonne in Paris. There he met his wife Micheline Charlotte, a descendant of the aristocratic Barlatier de Mas and Peghoux families. They had three children, E. Coutinho Neto, Tess P. Coutinho Dorea and Charlotte P. Coutinho Lisboa, and six grandchildren. His primary residence was the former Governor's mansion on Salvador's North Shore. He also spent time at the Coutinho country estate, Fazenda Nossa Senhora da Paz and on his yacht, The Breeze.

Coutinho died from complications of COVID-19 during the COVID-19 pandemic in Brazil.

== Career ==
At the Sorbonne, Coutinho studied with professor Claude Fromageot, which led to his interest in hormonal mechanisms, a topic on which he became a specialist and continued to research.

On his return from France he became an associate professor of physiology at UFBA, but not for long as he was invited to be a fellow of the Rockefeller Foundation in the area of reproductive endocrinology, there he worked at the "Rockefeller Institute for Medical Research", which has become "Rockefeller University". Following giants of human reproductive research such as A. Csapo and G. Corner (discoverers of progesterone) Coutinho began studying steroids with progestagenic effects, and in particular was able to identify the role of ions, calcium and magnesium as peripheral agents in the action of progesterone.

After leaving New York, Coutinho became the director of clinical research of the Climério de Oliveira Maternity Clinic of the Federal University of Bahia. Under his directorship the center became the first Human Reproduction Research Center of the World Health Organization in Latin America.

In the early 1960s Coutinho began studying the use of progestagenic substances in the prevention of premature births. In those studies he observed and described the contraceptive effect of medroxiprogesterone (MPA). These studies led to the discovery of the first injectable contraceptive: Ciclofem.

The discovery pushed Coutinho's research into the limelight, making him one of the world authorities in endocrinology and family planning. During that period Coutinho made family planning his cause célebre, and began creating family planning programs in collaboration with a number of countries and institutions, including that of China organized by the, then, University of Shanghai. Coutinho was the founder of the first large-scale free family planning centers in Brazil. The centers named CEPARH are open to the public and treat thousands of low-income women per year at no charge.

After Ciclofem, Coutinho was the pioneer of the studies that led to the discovery of the use of Depo-Provera, the first injectable contraceptive method with prolonged effects.

Coutinho also proposed the first contraceptive pill containing norgestrel, which is today the most used contraceptive pill method in the world. That discovery was followed by the first reduced dosage pill. Other discoveries by Coutinho include subcutaneous prolonged effect contraceptives (6 months, 1 year, 2 years, 3 years and 6 years), two intrauterine devices known as the Lorena Cross and the Caravaca Cross and Lovelle, the vaginal pill.

Coutinho was also responsible for the discovery of treatments for women with infertility caused by endometriosis, a topic on which he became a world expert, being the host and president of the 4th World Congress on Endometriosis. Coutinho published the first studies on the reduction of Miomas in 1982.

Coutinho was one of the founders of the "International Committee for Contraceptive Research" – ICCR, of the "Population Council", notorious for their work on IUDs medicated with copper and Norplant the subdermal hormonal implant with levonorgestrel.

He was also director of the human reproduction council of the "Steering Committee of the Task Force on Infertility of the Expanded Programme in Human Reproduction" of the World Health Organization.

Coutinho was a member of 32 medical societies. By the year 2000 he had participated as a guest lecturer in 253 congresses. He published 350 scientific studies, mostly in international medical journals such as Nature, Endocrinology, Fertility and Sterility, and The American Journal of Obstetrics, Gynecology and Contraception. He has published ten books. His book Is Menstruation Obsolete?, co-authored with Sheldon Segal in 1996, is in its 8th edition. The English version of this book was published by Oxford University Press and has received praise from medical journals such as The Lancet, Journal of the American Medical Association (JAMA) and the British Medical Association's reviewer who called it a masterpiece.

== Discoveries ==
- The Modern Contraceptive Pill
- The Vaginal Pill (Lovelle)
- The Cruz de Caravaca & Croix de Lorraine IUD's (Intra-Uterine-Devices)
- The Male Contraceptive Pill

== Male contraceptive pill ==
Coutinho was responsible for the discovery of the contraceptive effects of gossypol, a substance extracted from cotton. This discovery led to studies into the first male non-hormonal contraceptive pill.

== Menstrual suppression ==
Coutinho has studied menstrual suppression since the 1960s. Those studies culminated in the publishing of "Is Menstruation Obsolete", co-authored with Sheldon Segal.

== The Biology of Jealousy ==
O Sexo do Ciúme published in 2007, is a compilation of texts and studies which relate biology to human behaviour, along the lines of studies in human behavioural ecology. The author explains the natural factors which influence jealousy and male/female attitudes in regards to sex and relationships.

== Awards ==
- 1971: Upjohn Award, IFFS
- 1979: Medal of Achievement from the FBEFM
- 1985: Axel Munthe Award. Finalist, Axel Munthe.
- 1985: World Academy of Population and Health Sciences Award, World Academy of Population and Health Sciences.
- 1990: Christopher Columbus Award, International Federation of Fertility Societies (IFFS).
- 1990: 1st José Silveira Medal, Rotary Club
- 1992: Nominated to the Nobel Council by the Legislature of the State of Bahia
- 1993: Segal-Mastroianni Prize, World Academy of Art and Science.
- 1994: Merit Medal of the State of Bahia
- 2000: Tomé de Sousa Medal

== Controversy and criticism ==
Coutinho had a controversial career which included a public battle with Cardinal Moreira Neves, in which he and the Cardinal attacked each other through the press. The battle coincided with the Candelaria Massacre for which Coutinho said the church had indirect responsibility as the children were killed on their doorstep and whilst the church refused to acknowledge the need for family planning, after children were born and abandoned their doors were closed to them. He was accused of racism by the Geledes Black Women's Institute for only using images of black women on the publicity for his free clinics. Coutinho responded that the publicity is designed to suit the majority of the population and that what would be racist would be to make commercials with white women when the majority is black or mixed race.
