= Treat 'Em Right =

Single by Chubb Rock

from the album The One
- Released: 1991
- Genre: Hip hop
- Length: 4:43
- Label: Select
- Songwriters: Richard Simpson; Howard Thompson
- Producer: Howie Tee

Chubb Rock singles chronology
"Stop That Train" (1991)	"Treat 'Em Right" (1991)	"The Chubbster" (1991)

"Treat 'Em Right" is a 1991 song by rapper Chubb Rock. The song samples "There Was a Time" by Dee Felice Trio and "Love Thang" by First Choice.

The song was originally released on the Treat 'Em Right EP released in late 1990, which charted at No. 73 on the Billboard 200 and No. 22 on the R&B Albums. The song was then included on the Chubb Rock album The One and then was released as the album's lead single, becoming a transatlantic hit, charting at No. 67 on the UK Singles Chart and No. 95 on the Billboard Hot 100, No. 33 on the Hot R&B/Hip-Hop Singles & Tracks, No. 32 on the Dance Music/Club Play Singles, No. 11 on the Hot Dance Music/Maxi-Singles Sales and No. 1 on the Hot Rap Singles, where it spent three weeks at the top of the chart in March 1991 and was the first of four No. 1s on that chart, ending up at the top of the end-of-year Hot Rap Singles. In addition, the song was voted at No. 82 on VH1's 100 Greatest Hip-Hop Songs.

== Critical reception ==
Steve 'Flash' Juon of RapReviews.com said that the song "bridged the gap between boom bap and new jack beautifully. An uptempo booming bass background met with swing, married it, and produced a top ten hit as its offspring", adding that "his skillful rap lyrics were tinged with a sense of humility almost out of proportion to the star he was", that "the pulsating beat and message pulled party people out onto the dancefloor" and that "after a long synthesizer breakdown, you almost think the song is over, then all of a sudden Chubb crashes through your wall Kool-Aid style with one more dope verse that ends with "just treat me right, peace.""

== Use in popular culture ==
- The song was sampled by K'naan in his 2010 debut single "ABCs" on which Rock features. David Jeffries of AllMusic said that the song "presents Africa as a land of different priorities, where survival trumps education and "nobody fat enough for lipo." The long lost Chubb Rock appearance is just one of the stunning choices for guests".
- Mary J. Blige samples this song for the "Treat 'Em Right Remix" of "Just Fine" which features a verse from Lil Wayne.
- Girl Talk samples the song on his 2010 mashup album All Day.
- Vanilla Ice covered the song for his critically vilified covers album Vanilla Ice Is Back!.
- This song is frequently used as a compilation album closer:
  - The Hip Hop Box uses it to close its second disc (out of four).
  - DJ Jazzy Jeff also uses it to close disc two of his 2006 compilation album Hip-Hop Forever III; he also uses it to close the album because it contains two discs.
  - DJ Spinbad uses it to close his 2004 compilation album FabricLive.14, which was described by Matt Whalley of AllMusic as "a party in a can".
  - The song features in Freddy's Dead: The Final Nightmare and is included on the soundtrack. On this compilation album, the songs are in the order they are heard in the film and thus "Treat 'Em Right" does not close it.

== See also ==
- We Got Our Own Thang
