= Still Got It Made =

Studio album by Special Ed
- Released: October 26, 2004
- Recorded: 2003–2004
- Genre: Hip hop
- Length: 49:05
- Label: Semi Records
- Producer: Howie Tee

Special Ed chronology
The Best of Special Ed (2000)	Still Got It Made (2004)

Still Got It Made is the fourth album by the hip-hop emcee Special Ed, released in 2004.

== Track listing ==
1. Special
2. N.Y.C.
3. Really
4. Bouncin'
5. Who's the Man
6. Smile
7. All Night, All Day
8. I Know You
9. Kryptonite
10. We Gon Ride
11. Somebody Gotta Bleed
12. Dying Young
13. So Long, Goodbye
