= Revelations (Special Ed album) =

Studio album by Special Ed
- Released: June 27, 1995
- Recorded: August 1994 – April 1995
- Studio: Homeboy Studios (New York, NY); Howie's Crib (New York, NY); Dollar Cab Lab (Flatbush, NY); Power Play Studios (Long Island City, NY); Jammy's Recording Studio (Kingston, Jamaica); D&D Studios (New York, NY); Hi Class Studio; Quad Recording Studios (Manhattan, NY); Soundtrax Studio (New York, NY)
- Genre: Hip hop
- Length: 55:37
- Label: Profile
- Producer: Special Ed (also exec.); Ahmad Wyatt; Akshun; Dominic Owen; Fabian Hamilton; Father Shaheed; Howie Tee; Mark Sparks; O.C. Rodriguez

Special Ed chronology
Legal (1990)	Revelations (1995)	The Best of Special Ed (2000)

Professional ratings
Review scores
Source	Rating
AllMusic	3/5 stars
Muzik	3.5/5 stars

Revelations is the third studio album by American hip-hop emcee Special Ed. It was released on June 27, 1995, on Profile Records. The recording sessions took place at Homeboy Studios, at Howie's Crib, at Dollar Cab Lab, at Power Play Studios, at D&D Studios, at Quad Recording Studios, and at Soundtrax Studio in New York City, at Jammy's Recording Studio in Kingston, and at Hi Class Studio. The album was produced by Akshun, Mark Sparks, Ahmad Wyatt, Dominic Owen, Fabian Hamilton, Father Shaheed, Howie Tee, O.C. Rodriguez, and Special Ed. The album peaked at number 107 on the Billboard 200 album chart in the United States.

== Track listing ==
No.	Title	Writer(s)	Producer(s)	Length
1.	"Lyrics"	E. Archer; M. Sparks; L. Parker	Mark Sparks	4:24
2.	"Neva Go Back"	E. Archer; H. Thompson	Howie Tee	3:47
3.	"Rough 2 the Endin'"	E. Archer; R. Williams	Akshun	3:55
4.	"Walk the Walk"	E. Archer; M. Sparks	Mark Sparks	4:30
5.	"It's Only Gettin' Worse"	E. Archer	Special Ed	2:56
6.	"Just a Killa" (featuring Bounty Killer)	E. Archer; R. Price	Special Ed	4:42
7.	"Rukus"	E. Archer	Special Ed	3:36
8.	"Freaky Flow"	E. Archer; R. Williams	Akshun	3:17
9.	"Won't Be Long"	E. Archer; M. Sparks	Mark Sparks	4:38
10.	"Crazy"	E. Archer; D. Owen; F. Hamilton	Dominic Owen; Fabian Hamilton	3:48
11.	"Here I Go Again"	E. Archer; A. Wyatt; O. Rodriguez	Ahmad Wyatt; O.C. Rodriguez	3:22
12.	"Just Like Dat"	E. Archer; S. Phillips	Father Shaheed	3:31
13.	"Everyday Iza Gunshot"	E. Archer	Special Ed	4:24
14.	"We Rule"	E. Archer; R. Williams	Akshun	4:47
Total length:				55:37

Sample credits

- Track 1 contains a sample of "Mortal Thought" by KRS-One
- Track 2 contains a sample of "The Look of Love" by Isaac Hayes
- Track 7 contains a sample of "P.L.O. Style" performed by Method Man
- Track 8 contains a sample from "Come Clean" performed by Jeru the Damaja
- Track 11 contains material performed by Da Youngsta's

== Charts ==
Chart (1995)	Peak position
US Billboard 200	107
US Top R&B/Hip-Hop Albums (Billboard)	12
