= Mãe Gilda de Ogum =

Iyalorixá Gildásia dos Santos e Santos, known as Mãe Gilda de Ogum, was a Brazilian practitioner of Candomblé. In 1988, she founded the Ilê Axé Abassá de Ogum, a Candomblé Terreiro (or house of worship) in Lagoa do Abaeté in the Itapuã neighborhood of Salvador.

She herself was initiated into Candomblé in 1976 at the Terreiro de Oya. Upon completing many years of initiation in the religion, she received the position of yalorixá and in October 1988, she registered her Terreiro de Candomblé, Axé Abassá de Ogum. Mãe Gilda was a social activist and stood out for her strong personality and her efforts to improve the neighborhood of Nova Brasília de Itapuã.

She died on January 21, 2000, soon after she was attacked by the Universal Church of the Kingdom of God (known by its acronym IURD in Brazil) in the pages of Folha Universal. In 2007, the Federal Government of Brazil established the anniversary of her death (January 21) as the Day of Struggle against Religious Intolerance.
