= Think About It =

Think About It may refer to:

== Albums ==
- Think About It!, by Kate Ceberano, 1991
- Think About It, by Kevn Kinney, 2022

== Songs ==
- "Think About It" (Melanie C song), 2011
- "Think About It" (Naughty Boy song), 2013
- "Think (About It)", by Lyn Collins, 1972
- "Think About It", by Flight of the Conchords from the Flight of the Conchords TV episode "Mugged", 2007
- "Think About It", by Rich Homie Quan from Rich as in Spirit, 2018
- "Think About It", by Special Ed from Youngest in Charge, 1989
- "Think About It", by Thundamentals, 2016
- "Think About It", by the Yardbirds, 1968

== See also ==
- "Let Me Think About It", a song by Ida Corr and Fedde le Grand, 2007
