= Erasmus Hall High School =

Public school in New York City

Coordinates: 40°38′58″N 73°57′28″W

- Erasmus Hall Academy; Erasmus Hall High School
- U.S. National Register of Historic Places
- New York State Register of Historic Places
- New York City Landmark
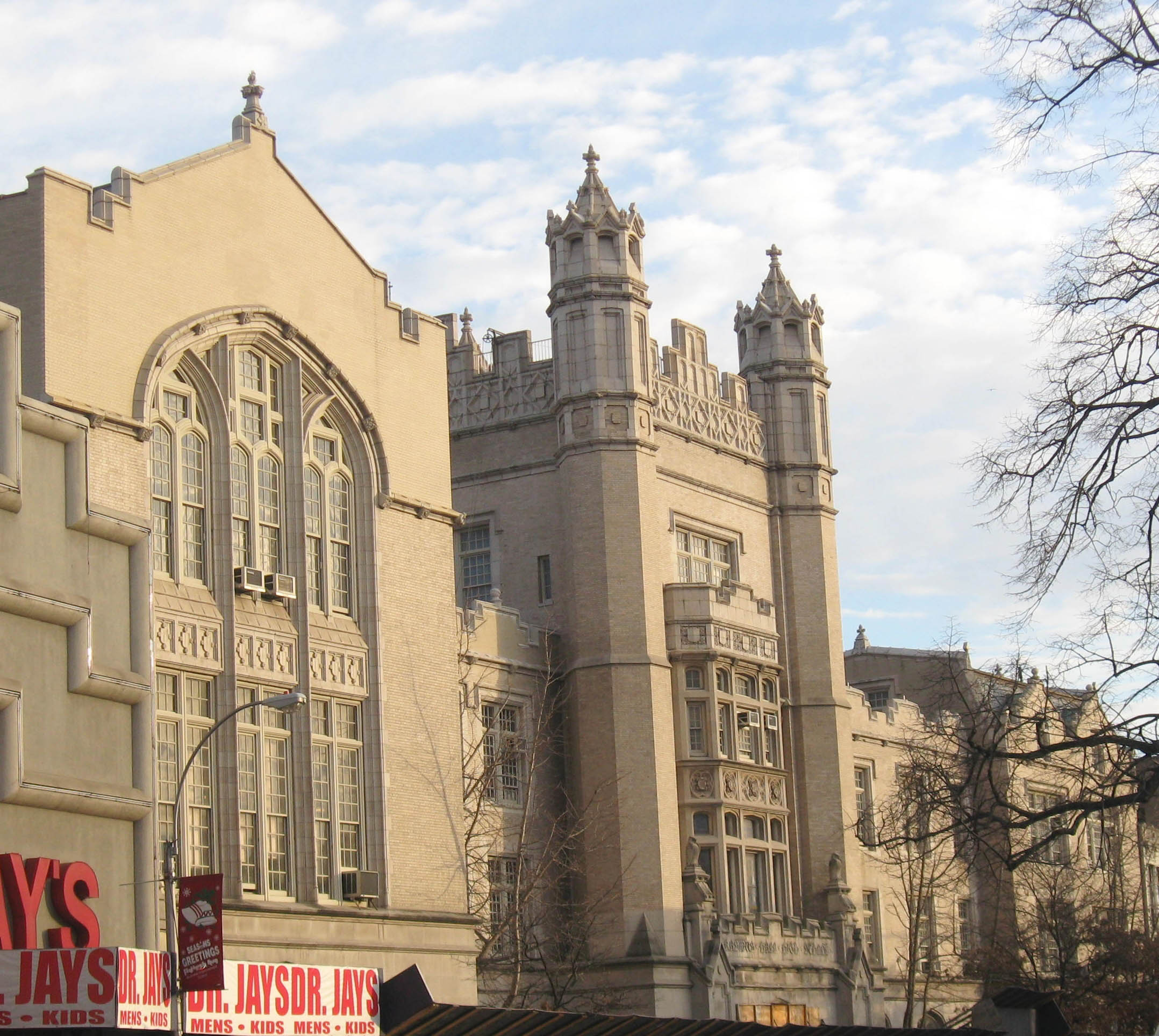
- From Flatbush Avenue (2008)

- Location within New York City Location within New York Location within the United States
- Location: 899-925 Flatbush Avenue; Brooklyn, New York City
- Built: Academy: 1786; High school: 1905-1906, 1909-1911, 1924-1925, 1939-1940
- Architectural style: Academy: Georgian-Federal; High school: Collegiate Gothic
- NRHP reference No.: 75001192
- NYSRHP No.: 04701.013887
- NYCL No.: 2130

Significant dates
- Added to NRHP: November 11, 1975
- Designated NYSRHP: June 23, 1980
- Designated NYCL: Academy: March 15, 1966; High school: June 24, 2003

Erasmus Hall High School was a four-year public high school located at 899–925 Flatbush Avenue between Church and Snyder Avenues in the Flatbush neighborhood of the New York City borough of Brooklyn. It was founded in 1786 as Erasmus Hall Academy, a private institution of higher learning named for the scholar Desiderius Erasmus, known as Erasmus of Rotterdam, a Dutch Renaissance humanist and Catholic Christian theologian. The school was the first secondary school chartered by the New York State Regents. The clapboard-sided, Georgian-Federal-style building, constructed on land donated by the Flatbush Reformed Dutch Church, was turned over to the public school system in 1896.

Around the start of the 20th century, Brooklyn experienced a rapidly growing population, and the original small school was enlarged with the addition of several wings and the purchase of several nearby buildings. In 1904, the Board of Education began a new building campaign to meet the needs of the burgeoning student population. The Superintendent of School Buildings, architect C. B. J. Snyder, designed a series of buildings to be constructed as needed, around an open quadrangle, while continuing to use the old building in the center of the courtyard. The original Academy building, which still stands in the courtyard of the current school, served the students of Erasmus Hall in three different centuries. Now a designated New York City Landmark and listed in the National Register of Historic Places, the building is a museum exhibiting the school's history.

Due to poor academic scores, the city closed Erasmus Hall High School in 1994, turning the building into Erasmus Hall Educational Campus and using it as the location for five separate small schools.

== History ==
=== Erasmus Hall Academy ===
Erasmus Hall Academy was founded as a private school by Reverend John H. Livingston and Senator John Vanderbilt in 1786 and became the first secondary school chartered by the New York State Board of Regents. Land was donated by the Flatbush Dutch Reformed Church for the building and contributions were collected for “an institution of higher learning,” from leading citizens such as Aaron Burr, Alexander Hamilton, Peter Lefferts and Robert Livingston.

The wood-framed, clapboard-sided, Georgian and Federal style school building, two and one-half stories tall with hipped roof, was opened in 1787 with 26 students. Through the years, various wings were added to the academy building and later removed.

Erasmus Hall Academy began accepting female students in 1801, and in 1803 it incorporated the village school of Flatbush. The village evolved into a city, and started a public school system that competed with Erasmus for its student body. As a result, there was a steady decline in its enrollment until in 1896 enrollment was reduced to 150 boys and girls, up from the 105 boys who were registered in the school in 1795. The board of trustees decided to donate the academy to the public school system with the following resolution by the board of trustees:

That the Board of Trustees offer the grounds of the Academy to the Board of Education of the City of Brooklyn upon the following conditions, viz: In consideration of the gift of the land the Board of Education are to erect and maintain upon said land a High School Building of the same character and grade as other High School Buildings in the City of Brooklyn.

=== Erasmus Hall High School ===
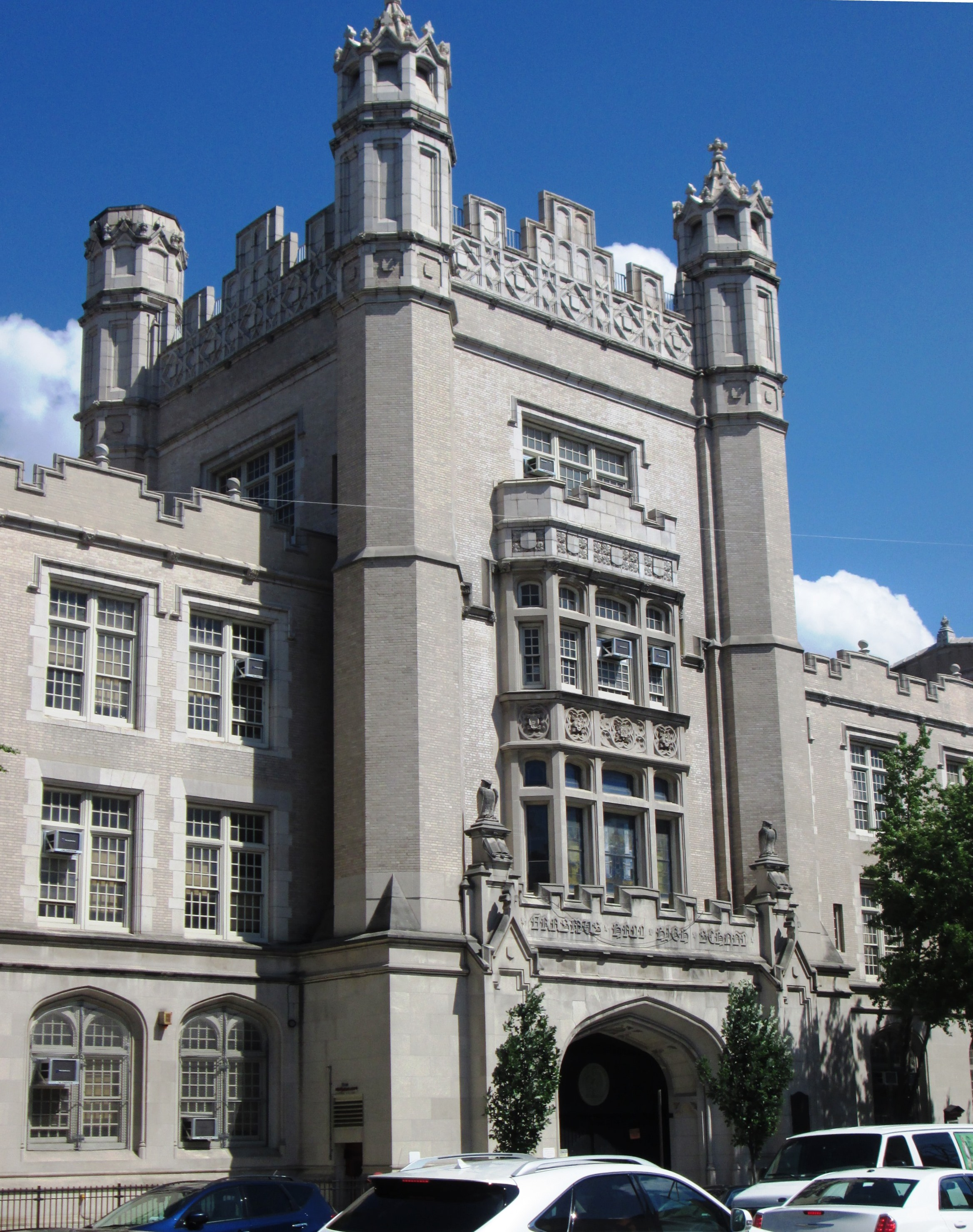
The main tower

Following the agreement with the Erasmus Hall Board of Trustees, the Board of Education of the City of Brooklyn requested proposals for a design for a new school building. Twenty architects responded with plans, several of which were published in contemporary architectural periodicals.

It soon became clear that none of these plans could be erected for less than a million dollars, and since that was considered too expensive, the project was dropped. The Brooklyn Board of Education did however, approve "temporary additions" to the school to accommodate the growing population and purchased additional property to allow more room to build a new school.

With the consolidation of the City of New York in 1898, the highly varied needs of schools in all the boroughs came under the purview of the New York City school board. This board had to cope with a sizable number of independently administered school districts, each with its own curricula, grade divisions, educational policies, and standards, and weld them all into a single, uniform educational system. At the same time, New York City was experiencing a huge influx of immigrants (increasing the school registers between 1900 and 1904 by 132,000 pupils), and the schools were expected to help Americanize these new students. New high schools were needed in all the boroughs and the Board of Education authorized large new buildings for Morris High School in the Bronx, DeWitt Clinton High School in The Bronx, Curtis High School in Staten Island, Flushing High School in Queens, and Erasmus Hall High School in Brooklyn.

In the interim, however, before a new building for Erasmus Hall could be constructed, the Board of Education purchased more land along Bedford Avenue near the existing building, and established classrooms in the expansion buildings that were already on the lot. They also used classrooms in other schools, such as P.S. 977, and held half-day classes.

The modern high school was designed in the Collegiate Gothic style that Snyder used on many of his buildings.

On August 17, 1904, the New York City School Board's Committee on Buildings presented its plans for a new campus for Erasmus Hall High School. It was designed to be constructed around the existing, centrally located buildings, so that classes could continue to be held there until the new buildings were ready. The plan called for a full quadrangle of buildings along the perimeter of the large lot. It was constructed during four periods: 1905–1906, 1909–1911, 1924–1925, and 1939–1940, with the two later buildings supervised by William H. Gompert and Eric Kebbon, respectively. Its buff brick facades have limestone and terra cotta trim and feature central entrance towers with Oriel windows and crenellated parapets, Tudor-arched entrances, label moldings, and large window groupings. The style of Erasmus Hall evolved over the years so that the most recent buildings are simpler, with less ornamentation, but retain the general characteristics of the earlier ones, giving a sense of unity to the entire composition. The first buildings would be constructed along Flatbush Avenue, with others added over time, as the need became clear and funds became available.

==== Phase One ====
Snyder explained his plans for the first phase as follows:

... A careful study of the matter convinced me that after all it was a good thing for the future of the school that the present one could not be disturbed, for therein lay the suggestion for a design unique in high schools of the country... A quadrangle enclosed by buildings devoted to various departments of school work.

The buildings, therefore, have been designed as a screen across the end of the quadrangle, shutting out the noise and confusion of Flatbush Avenue traffic, the only entrance being through the large arch under the tower, which is placed on the axis of the longer dimension of the plot.

This, as designed, would be called a chapel were it part of a college, but if we may not aspire to this, yet I have thought that it might be known as 'the Hall.' As such the endeavor has been to design a harmonious, impressive room, in a style permeated with history and romance; a place which, of all others, will stand out clearly in the loving memory of the student in after years for his alma mater. Its walls, columns and arches should bear the trophies won in athletic and scholastic contests, there to be preserved and handed down as part of the glorious history of the school.

There have been no designs made for this elevation (Bedford Avenue), but the aim has been to have a central tower on the same axis as that on Flatbush Avenue, through the archway in the base of which will be afforded a view of the 'quad' with its greensward, trees, shrubs and vines. What the ultimate design of the various buildings going to make up the group may be, it is, of course, impossible to say, but in designing and planning that portion which you now see approaching completion, I have always intended that the whole should be a graphic illustration of the various phases of the so-called Gothic movement, from the Round Arch to the Flamboyant and on through its later transitional stage.

The Committee on Buildings described the first section, estimated to cost not more than $300,000, this way:

It consists of an entrance tower which will be the center of what will afterwards be the completed front on Flatbush avenue; to the left of the tower and connected therewith has been placed the building in the rear portion of which will be the auditorium, classrooms, library, etc. The building will be three and four stories in height.

The basement will contain the gymnasium, placed beneath the auditorium, lecture rooms, baths, toilet room, etc., the boiler or power room being placed beneath the driveway of the tower, one of the turrets of which is utilized for a smoke flue.

The first floor will contain the offices of the principal of the school, two classrooms and the auditorium.

The second story will contain a library 40 feet (12 m) square with a gallery facing the second story of the tower, the balance of the floor being apportioned to the gallery of the auditorium, four classrooms, teacher's rooms, toilets, etc.

The third floor will contain four classrooms, demonstration room, balance room, chemical laboratory, and lecture room.

The fourth story, which is over a portion of the building, will contain four classrooms. The completed scheme of which this is only a part contemplates the erection of a building on the northerly side of the tower for additional classrooms and laboratories, etc., as may be needed in the future.

The cornerstone for the new building was laid in January 1905 and work was begun immediately, resulting in seating for an additional 600 students. The construction contract was initially supposed to run until October 1905, but revisions required by the school board for laboratories and classrooms necessitated changes in the electrical and sanitation plans and delayed the work. The building was opened to students in September 1906.

In 1906, the committee purchased a real estate lot that was 57' 10" X 138' 9" X 359' 3" X 7' 3" X 493' 6" “adjoining Erasmus Hall High School... to permit carrying out of the scheme for a building commanding a quadrangle, and will be built upon as soon as the school is in need of additional accommodations.

==== Phase Two ====
Although the first section of the new building brought the total students accommodated in 1906 to 1,750, by 1907 Erasmus Hall was again overcrowded, requiring the use of an annex at P.S. 42.

In his annual report, the Superintendent of Schools declared that,

The largest growth in high schools is found in Brooklyn. This growth arises not only from the natural increase in the number of pupils entering from the Brooklyn elementary schools, but also from the number of pupils entering from the Manhattan elementary schools ...The consequence is that the Brooklyn high schools are all crowded to excess.

Concerned citizens of the area wrote to the Board of Education emphasizing:

... the fact that the new building contains only twelve classrooms, accommodating only 420 pupils, whereas there are fifty-two classes, comprising 1,591 pupils, occupying classrooms in the old frame school building and cottages, all of which are utterly unfit for use.

The Superintendent's Annual Report for 1910 reported that 3,114 pupils were enrolled at Erasmus Hall High School and that they were accommodated in four different annex buildings in addition to the main one.

In 1909, the Board of Education approved Snyder's plans for the next section of the school. This group of three buildings, including one to the north of the tower facing Flatbush Avenue, and two extending east along the northern side of the lot, comprised 31 classrooms, laboratories, study hall, music, drawing, physics, lecture and shop rooms. When this Church Avenue addition opened in September 1911, there was room for 1,451 more students in the main school.

==== Phase Three ====
The ever-growing school population continued to present challenges to the school board. In his report of May 21, 1924 on construction and maintenance, the Superintendent of Schools discussed "the stupendous building program now being carried on by the Board of Education..." The reason for this situation was given as a backlog of not enough building over several years, as well as an increase in high school population in New York City from 20,948 students in 1904, to 109,370 in 1924. These large numbers were attributed to many factors, including the passage and enforcement of a compulsory education law and the appreciation by more parents of the advantages of higher education to their children. In April 1924, the Board of Education approved the Bedford Avenue addition to Erasmus Hall High School. Snyder had left his position with the Board of Education shortly before construction of this section, but an elevation drawing in the collection of the Art Commission, by C. B. J. Snyder shows the building essentially as built. William Gompert had been appointed in his place and supervised the construction. Although somewhat simpler than his earlier buildings, the Bedford building has a central tower with an arched passageway into the courtyard, on axis with the tower on Flatbush Avenue. The building contained many new classrooms, gymnasia and a large swimming pool along the courtyard and was opened on February 2, 1902.

A statue of Erasmus, cast from the 1622 original in Rotterdam by Hendrick de Keyser and donated by Richard Young, an alumnus of the school, was installed in the school's courtyard. Dedicated in 1931, the base is engraved with the words:

Desiderius Erasmus, the maintainer and restorer of the sciences and polite literature, the greatest man of his century, the excellent citizen who, through his immortal writings, acquired an everlasting fame.

==== Phase Four ====
Lobbying began in 1929 for the construction of the final section, the building on the south side of the lot connecting the Bedford Avenue building with the auditorium near Flatbush Avenue. Money was not appropriated for this until 1937, and it was finally built in 1939–40. Under the supervision of the school system's then chief architect, Eric Kebbon, the five-story building was an even more simplified version of Snyder's earlier work. It contained many classrooms, art and homemaking rooms, a girls' gym and a large library, and could accommodate 1,566 additional pupils. The new section opened in September 1940. To construct this building, the original frame school house had to be moved and its several wings demolished. Work on the old structure was begun by the Works Progress Administration, but was halted due to the outbreak of World War II. After the war, the relocation and restoration of the old building was completed and it was used for administrative offices.

In 1987, in celebration of the school's bicentennial, limited archaeological excavations were conducted under the auspices of Brooklyn College. The archaeologists discovered that intact deposits from the 18th and 19th centuries associated with the development of the school are still in place.

== Closure and current status ==
In 1994, after years of poor academic scores, the huge Erasmus Hall High School was divided internally into five smaller high schools, each concentrating on a different academic area. The five schools have separate administrations and faculties, and hold classes in different sections of the large building. However, they use the common lunchroom, gymnasium, library and auditorium at separate times during the day. This division created no changes on the exterior of the building.

As of 2010, separate high schools now operate on the Erasmus Hall Educational Campus:

- Academy for College Preparation and Career Exploration: A College Board School (K382)
- Academy of Hospitality and Tourism (K408)
- High School for Service & Learning at Erasmus (K539)
- High School for Youth and Community Development at Erasmus (K537)
- Science, Technology and Research Early College High School/Middle School at Erasmus (K543)

=== Restorations ===
In 2011, the columns that supported the building were found to have structural problems, and that year, the building received a restoration. In 2017, Eric Adams, then Brooklyn Borough President, pledged $650,000 of the capital budget for exterior restoration. A 2019 report states that "the building still needs more love".

== Notable alumni ==
Erasmus Hall has had a number of famous and accomplished alumni (and some who are mistakenly believed to have attended, such as Barbara Stanwyck). Some of the better known, including (class year, or birth and death dates), are listed below.

=== Pre-20th century ===
- John M. Berrien (1793); Attorney General of the United States and Senator.
- George Hall; first mayor of Brooklyn.
- John W. Hunter (1824); New York State Senator, Congressman, and mayor of Brooklyn.
- Morris Smith Miller (1794); Congressman and First Judge of Oneida County.
- George M. Troup (1792); Governor of Georgia.

=== 20th century ===
- Rebecca Alpert (born 1950), professor of Jewish American religious history who was one of the first congregational women rabbis
- Mary Anderson, silent film actress
- Irving Anker (1911–2000), educator and administrator
- Herbert Aptheker (1915–2003), Marxist historian, Communist and political activist
- Bob Arum, boxing promoter.
- David Attie, photographer, who later shot portraits of fellow Erasmus Hall alumnus Bobby Fischer
- Tony Balsamo (1931), Major League Baseball pitcher for the Chicago Cubs
- Joseph Barbera (1928), artist; cartoonist; co-founder of Hanna-Barbera
- Sylvan Barnet (1926–2016), literary critic and Shakespearean scholar
- Jeff Barry (Joel Adelberg) (1955), songwriter/producer; Songwriters Hall of Fame member
- Louis Begley (born 1933), Polish-born American novelist
- Randy E. Bennett, educational researcher
- Barbara Berman (born 1938), represented New Jersey's 6th legislative district for a single term
- Karen Bernod, singer
- Miriam Bienstock (1923–2015), record company executive
- Morton Birnbaum (1926–2005), lawyer and physician
- Julius Blank (1925–2011), semiconductor pioneer
- Florence Bolan, U.S. Secret Service special agent
- Clara Bow, silent film actress
- Oscar Brand (1920–2016), Canadian-born American folk singer-songwriter and author
- Alvin Bronstein (1928–2015), lawyer, founder and director emeritus of the National Prison Project of the American Civil Liberties Union Foundation
- Carol Bruce, actress and singer
- Phillip Brutus, Florida politician
- Artie Butler, music arranger and songwriter
- Miriam Goldman Cedarbaum, Senior Judge of the United States District Court for the Southern District of New York
- Theodore Caplow (1920–2015), sociologist, author, founder of the Department of Sociology at the University of Virginia
- Jeff Chandler (Ira Grossel) (1935), actor
- Andrew Cheshire (1981), artist/musician
- Hy Cohen, Major League Baseball player
- Karl P. Cohen (1913–2012), physical chemist who became a mathematical physicist
- Steven M. Cohen (born 1950), sociologist
- Al Cohn, tenor saxophonist
- Betty Comden (1933), playwright, Broadway musical songwriter with Adolph Green
- Jane Cowl (Jane Bailey) (1902), actress, playwright
- Billy Cunningham (1961), player and coach, Philadelphia '76ers basketball team
- Jon Cypher (1949), actor (Hill Street Blues)
- Jim Cymbala pastor at Brooklyn Tabernacle
- Howard David (1962), sportscaster
- George Dargo (1953), professor at New England Law Boston
- Al Davis (c. 1947), Oakland Raiders owner, Pro Football Hall of Fame member
- Clive Davis (1949), Grammy Award winning record producer; Chairman & CEO BMG North America; founder of Arista Records
- Neil Diamond (attended Erasmus from 1954 to '56), singer/songwriter
- Will Downing (1981), singer
- Mort Drucker (born 1929), caricaturist and comics artist
- Norm Drucker, professional basketball official
- Genevieve Earle (1885–1956), first woman elected to the New York City Council, in 1937
- Bobby Fischer (dropped out in 1960), chess champion
- Jim Florio (1964), former Governor of New Jersey
- Joseph C. H. Flynn, lawyer, politician, and magistrate
- Arthur Frommer, travel writer who founded the Frommer's travel guides
- Robert Peter Gale (1962), physician, biomedical scientist and author
- Dave Getz (1957), drummer Big Brother and the Holding Company
- Theresa Goell, archaeologist
- Jeffrey P. Gold, MD, cardiac surgeon and chancellor, University of Nebraska Medical Center
- Jonah Goldman, major league baseball player
- Deborah Grabien (c. 1971), novelist/essayist; musician and songwriter
- Earl G. Graves (1952), publisher of Black Enterprise magazine
- Clement Greenberg (1909–1994), essayist
- William Lindsay Gresham (1909–1962), novelist and non-fiction author
- Arno Gruen, psychoanalyst, psychologist and writer
- Susan Hayward (Edythe Marrenner), (1935), Oscar-winning actress
- Eleanor Holm (1932), Olympic swimmer
- Alice Sterling Honig (1929–2023), child psychologist
- Mikhail Horowitz (born 1950), poet, parodist, satirist, social commentator, author and editor
- Moe Howard (Moses Harry Horwitz) (dropped out after two months, 1915), member of the Three Stooges comedy team
- Waite Hoyt, Baseball Hall of Fame pitcher for the New York Yankees and long-time broadcaster for the Cincinnati Reds
- Stanley Edgar Hyman (c. 1933), literary critic; husband of Shirley Jackson
- Marty Ingels, comedian; husband of Shirley Jones
- Ned Irish (1924), organizer of first Madison Square Garden basketball tournament (1934); founder of the New York Knicks; president, Madison Square Garden; member of the Basketball Hall of Fame
- Brian Jackson, pianist, flautist and songwriter who wrote and performed with Gil Scott Heron and the Midnight Band throughout the 1970s
- Suzanne Kaaren (Sophie Kischnerman) (1912–2004), actress
- Roger Kahn (1945), sportswriter, author of several books including The Boys of Summer
- Tom Kahn (1956), leader of the civil rights, social-democratic, and labor movements
- Eric Kandel (1944), winner of Nobel Prize for Medicine or Physiology, 2000
- Lainie Kazan (Lainie Levine) (1956), actress and singer
- Elizabeth Lapovsky Kennedy (1956), academic and historian
- Dorothy Kilgallen (1930), newspaper journalist, television game show panelist and talk radio personality
- Elaine de Kooning (1918–1989), abstract expressionist and figurative expressionist painter
- Bernie Kopell (1953), actor
- Harold Kushner (1951), rabbi and author
- Arthur Laurents (1917–2011), playwright, stage director and screenwriter
- Daniel Lang, author and journalist
- Dr. Mabel Ping-Hua Lee (1896–1966); well-known figure in the women's suffrage movement, first Chinese woman in the United States to earn a PhD in economics, established the First Chinese Baptist Church and the Chinese Community Center
- Samuel LeFrak (1936), real estate developer
- Larry Levan, DJ
- Ira N. Levine, author and professor of chemistry at Brooklyn College
- Abraham Lilienfeld, epidemiologist and professor
- Sid Luckman (1935), football champion with the Chicago Bears; NFL quarterback and Pro Football Hall of Fame.
- Bernard Malamud (1932), author and educator; Pulitzer Prize for The Magic Barrel, 1958 and The Fixer, 1967
- Daniel Mann (attended in 1920s, transferred before graduating), film and television director
- Kedar Massenburg (1981), former CEO/President of Motown Records
- Barbara McClintock (1919), winner of Nobel Prize for Physiology or Medicine, 1983
- Joseph McGoldrick (1901–1978), NYC Comptroller and NY State Residential Rent Control Commissioner, lawyer, and professor
- Aline MacMahon, actress
- Don McMahon, Major League Baseball player
- James Meissner (1914), World War I Flying Ace
- Stephanie Mills, (1975), actress/singer
- Doug Moe, (1956), long time player and coach, ABA and NBA
- Don Most (1970), actor
- Mark D. Naison (born 1946), historian
- Jay Neugeboren (born 1938), novelist, essayist, and short story writer
- Matthew Nimetz (born 1939), diplomat
- Bob Olin (c. 1926), boxer and world light heavyweight champion
- William E. Paul (1936–2015), immunologist
- Lee Pockriss (1924–2011), songwriter
- Emil Praeger (1892–1973), civil engineer
- Gilbert Price (1960), singer/actor, protege of Langston Hughes
- Marky Ramone (Marc Steven Bell), drummer of seminal New York punk band The Ramones
- Michael Rapaport, TV actor, attended Erasmus in the 1980s
- Eleanor Raskin (née Stein; born 1946), member of the Weatherman, adjunct instructor at Albany Law School
- Lynn Pressman Raymond (c. 1912–2009), toy and game innovator who was president of the Pressman Toy Corporation
- Jerry Reinsdorf (1953), part-owner of the Chicago Bulls and Chicago White Sox
- Wayne Rhoden, attended Erasmus in 1981; music producer, singer, songwriter, sound engineer and video editor/director professionally known as the artist Father Goose Music
- Mike Rosen (1960), Denver radio talk show host
- Robert Rosen (1970), author of the best-selling biography Nowhere Man: The Final Days of John Lennon
- Alvin Roth (1948), college basketball player
- Arlene Rothlein, postmodern dancer/choreographer and actress
- Lewis Rowland, neurologist, president of the American Neurological Association and the American Academy of Neurology
- Sam Rutigliano, former NFL head coach
- Arthur M. Sackler, MD (1931), pharmaceutical executive and art collector
- Harry Saltzman (1915), US intelligence officer and film producer
- David Salzman (1961), American television producer and businessman
- Curtis Samuel (1996), NFL wide receiver
- Guy Sands-Pingot, (1974), U.S. Army brigadier general
- Harvey Schiller, sports executive
- Sheldon Segal (c. 1943), contraceptive developer
- Alan Shulman (attended between 1928 and 1929), composer and cellist
- Beverly Sills (Belle Miriam Silverman), coloratura opera singer, attended Erasmus in the mid-1940s and transferred before graduating.
- Robert Silverberg (1952), novelist
- Harold Snyder (1922–2008), businessperson who started Biocraft Laboratories
- Special Ed (Edward Archer), rapper who mentions Erasmus Hall on his album Youngest in Charge
- Melodee M. Spevack (1970), actress, writer, anime voice performer
- Mickey Spillane (Frank Morrison Spillane) (1936); author of detective and mystery fiction
- Bern Nadette Stanis (Bernadette Stanislaus) (1972), actress
- Barbra Streisand (Barbara Joan Streisand) (1959), actress, singer, director, producer
- Paul Sylbert (1946), art director and set designer
- Richard Sylbert (1946) Academy Award-winning art director and set designer, twin brother of Paul
- Constance Talmadge, silent movie star
- Norma Talmadge (1911), silent film actress
- Verree Teasdale (1903–1987), actress of stage and screen
- Adrianne Tolsch (c. 1956), comedian
- Cheryl Toussaint (1970), athlete, Olympic gold medalist, 1972
- D. Train (James Williams) (1980), singer/songwriter
- Overton Tremper (1922), professional baseball player for the Brooklyn Dodgers
- Kenny Vance, musician, who calls out Erasmus Hall in the first line of "Looking for an Echo"
- Eli Wallach, (1932); actor
- A. J. Weberman, (1959); inventor of the words "garbology" and "Dylanology"
- Sonny Werblin (1910–1991), entertainment industry executive and sports impresario, owner of the New York Jets, chairman of Madison Square Garden
- Mae West (Mary Jane West) (1911); actress, comedian, playwright
- Anne Elizabeth Wilson writer, poet, editor; pet cemetery owner
- Marian Winters (c. 1942), actress.
- Paula Wolfert (1955), award-winning cookbook author and Mediterranean cuisines specialist

=== 21st century ===
- Christian Izien (2018); professional football safety for the Detroit Lions
- Matthew Jones (2018); college football offensive guard for the Ohio State Buckeyes
- Curtis Samuel (2014); professional football wide receiver for the Buffalo Bills of the National Football League

== See also ==
- List of New York City Landmarks
- National Register of Historic Places listings in Kings County, New York
