= I Gotta Get Mine Yo =

I Gotta Get Mine Yo! (Book of Rhymes)

Studio album by Chubb Rock
- Released: September 1, 1992
- Recorded: 1991–92
- Genre: East Coast hip hop
- Length: 1:00:18
- Label: Select
- Producer: Chubb Rock; Trackmasters

Chubb Rock chronology
The One (1991)	I Gotta Get Mine Yo! (Book of Rhymes) (1992)	The Mind (1997)

Singles from I Gotta Get Mine Yo! (Book of Rhymes)
- 1. "Lost in the Storm" Released: September 17, 1992; 2. "Yabadabadoo" Released: December 10, 1992

Professional ratings
Review scores
Source	Rating
AllMusic	2/5 stars
Entertainment Weekly	B−
RapReviews	8/10

I Gotta Get Mine Yo! (Book of Rhymes) is the fourth studio album by Chubb Rock. It was released on September 1, 1992, via Select Records. The album was produced by Trackmasters and Chubb Rock. It features contributions from Erma Franklin, Deneen Lowe, Eric Milteer, Curt Gowdy, Rob Swinga, and Grand Puba. The album peaked at No. 127 on the Billboard 200 and No. 24 on the Top R&B/Hip-Hop Albums. It spawned two singles: "Lost in the Storm" and "Yabadabadoo"/"I'm Too Much".

== Track listing ==
All music is composed by Chubb Rock and Trackmasters.

No.	Title	Writer(s)	Length
1.	"Some-O-Next Shit"	R. Simpson; S. Barnes; J.C. Olivier; F. Pimentel; A. Richbourg	3:04
2.	"I'm the Man"	R. Simpson; S. Barnes; J.C. Olivier; F. Pimentel; A. Richbourg; J. Morrison; R. Manzarek; R. Krieger; J. Densmore	2:44
3.	"Pop 'Nuff Shit"	R. Simpson; S. Barnes; J.C. Olivier; F. Pimentel; A. Richbourg	2:42
4.	"Don't Drink the Milk"	R. Simpson; S. Barnes; J.C. Olivier; F. Pimentel; A. Richbourg; R. Pimentel	3:38
5.	"The Hatred"	R. Simpson; S. Barnes; J.C. Olivier; F. Pimentel; A. Richbourg; C. Hudson; L. Stevens	3:48
6.	"Lost in the Storm"	R. Simpson; S. Barnes; J.C. Olivier; F. Pimentel; A. Richbourg; P. Adams; T. Gonzalez	3:59
7.	"Which Way Is Up"	R. Simpson; S. Barnes; J.C. Olivier; F. Pimentel; A. Richbourg	2:47
8.	"Black Trek IV the Voyage Home"	R. Simpson; S. Barnes; J.C. Olivier; F. Pimentel; A. Richbourg	3:31
9.	"Yabadabadoo"	R. Simpson; S. Barnes; J.C. Olivier; F. Pimentel; A. Richbourg; R. Dicks	2:59
10.	"So Much Things to Say"	R. Simpson; S. Barnes; J.C. Olivier; F. Pimentel; A. Richbourg	1:46
11.	"The Funky"	R. Simpson; S. Barnes; J.C. Olivier; F. Pimentel; A. Richbourg	2:40
12.	"Three Men at Chung King"	R. Simpson; S. Barnes; J.C. Olivier; F. Pimentel; A. Richbourg; M. Dixon	2:26
13.	"I Need Some Blow"	R. Simpson; S. Barnes; J.C. Olivier; F. Pimentel; A. Richbourg	2:17
14.	"I'm Too Much"	R. Simpson; S. Barnes; J.C. Olivier; F. Pimentel; A. Richbourg	3:31
15.	"My Brother"	R. Simpson; S. Barnes; J.C. Olivier; F. Pimentel; A. Richbourg; E. Milteer; L. Sylvers; S. Shockley	3:15
16.	"I Don't Want to Be Lonely"	R. Simpson; S. Barnes; J.C. Olivier; F. Pimentel; A. Richbourg	3:21
17.	"I Gotta Get Mine Yo"	R. Simpson; S. Barnes; J.C. Olivier; F. Pimentel; A. Richbourg; J. Fitch, Jr.; T. Life	2:45
18.	"A Message to the B.A.N."	R. Simpson; S. Barnes; J.C. Olivier; F. Pimentel; A. Richbourg	4:07
19.	"Enter the Dragon"	R. Simpson; S. Barnes; J.C. Olivier; F. Pimentel; A. Richbourg	2:51
20.	"The Arrival"	R. Simpson; S. Barnes; J.C. Olivier; F. Pimentel; A. Richbourg	2:25
21.	"See You in October"	S. Barnes	4:27
Total length:			1:00:18

== Personnel ==
- Richard Simpson – vocals, producer
- Erma Franklin – vocals (track 2)
- Jean-Claude Olivier – additional vocals (track 4), producer
- Richard Pimentel – additional vocals (track 4)
- Deneen Lowe – vocals (tracks: 5, 6)
- Samuel Barnes – additional vocals (tracks: 9, 12), producer
- Robert Dicks – additional vocals (track 9)
- Maxwell Dixon – additional vocals (track 12)
- Eric Milteer – vocals (tracks: 15, 16)
- Frank "Nitty" Pimentel – producer
- Alexander Richbourg – producer
- Herb Powers Jr. – mastering
- Amy Bennick – art direction
- Michael Britto – photography
- Peter Bodtke – photography
