= George Dargo =

American legal scholar

- Born: July 22, 1935; Brooklyn, New York City
- Died: January 5, 2012 (aged 76); Brookline, Massachusetts

Academic background
- Education: Columbia University (BA, MA, PhD); Northeastern University School of Law (JD)

Academic work
- Discipline: American legal history
- Institutions: New England Law Boston

George Dargo (July 22, 1935 – January 5, 2012) was an American legal scholar who specializes in American legal history and the legal system of Louisiana. He was a longtime law professor at New England Law Boston.

== Biography ==
Dargo grew up in Brooklyn, New York City, and graduated from Erasmus Hall High School in 1953. He graduated from Columbia College with a bachelor's degree in American history and was a classmate of biblical scholar Robert Alter. He then received his master's and doctorate degrees from Columbia. He also received a Juris Doctor degree from the Northeastern University School of Law. He became interested in law because his father was a law school graduate and taught in the New York City Public Schools.

Dargo joined the New England Law School faculty in 1983. Before that, he worked as a history professor and wrote a number of books about American legal history. His book Jefferson's Louisiana (1975, republished 2010) was called one of the most important studies of the Louisiana Purchase and its impact on the legal culture and legal system of the state.

Dargo died on January 5, 2012, of skin cancer in his Brookline home.
