= Special Ed (rapper) =

American rapper (born 1972)

- Born: Edward K. Archer; May 16, 1972 (age 54); Brooklyn, New York City, U.S.
- Occupations: Rapper; songwriter; record producer; actor
- Years active: 1988–present
- Children: 3
- Musical career
- Genres: East Coast hip hop; hardcore hip hop
- Labels: Profile; Semi
- Formerly of: Crooklyn Dodgers

Edward K. Archer (born May 16, 1972), known professionally as Special Ed, is an American rapper and producer. Ed is perhaps best known for the songs "I Got It Made", "Think About It" and "I'm the Magnificent" from his debut album Youngest in Charge, released in 1989 when he was 17 years old.

== Biography ==
Born in Brooklyn, New York City to an Afro-Jamaican father and Indo-Jamaican mother, Ed was raised in Flatbush before moving to Canarsie, and is identified with East Coast hip-hop. Ed attended Erasmus Hall High School and Samuel J. Tilden High School. At the age of fifteen, he established a rapport with his neighbor Howie Tee, who worked with him on his demo. Ed's debut album Youngest in Charge was released in 1989 and included the songs "I Got It Made", "Think About It" and "I'm The Magnificent", which were produced by "Hitman" Howie Tee. In an interview with Billboard (magazine) writer James Richliano, Special Ed, who co-wrote his songs, said that he, "used to like writing poetry and creative writing in school," and that he, "wrote a lot of lyrics that amused my teachers. Even when I was younger, I could kick a beat with my hands and rhyme at the same time."

Youngest in Charge sold more than half a million copies. In 1990, Ed released his album Legal, the title a reference to his turning eighteen, with the singles "Come On Let's Move It" and "The Mission". Ed was later a member of Crooklyn Dodgers, a supergroup put together in order to perform songs for the Spike Lee films Clockers and Crooklyn, and he performed "Crooklyn" with Shillz on the 2003 compilation album MuskaBeatz. Ed released a third solo album, Revelations, with the single "Neva Go Back" in 1995, with the track "Freaky Flow" receiving a remix by DJ Premier.

In 2004, Ed released the album Still Got It Made on his own label, Semi. Ed appeared in the film Ganked, alongside Kel Mitchell of Kenan and Kel, and had an uncredited cameo in Juice. He also made an appearance on The Cosby Show as fictional rapper JT Freeze and in a Rick Ross music video entitled "Magnificent". He also appeared in the 1992 movie Fly By Night.

In 2008, his song "I Got It Made" appeared in the action-adventure video game Grand Theft Auto IV on the fictional radio station "The Classics 104.1".

Ed was inducted as an honorary member of Phi Beta Sigma fraternity during the organization's International Conclave in Tampa, Florida, on July 19, 2025.

== Discography ==
=== Studio albums ===
List of studio albums, with selected chart positions
Title	Album details	Peak chart positions	
Title	Album details	US	US R&B /HH
Youngest in Charge	Released: May 16, 1989; Label: Profile; Formats: CD, LP, cassette, digital download, streaming	73	8
Legal	Released: July 19, 1990; Label: Profile; Formats: CD, LP, cassette, digital download, streaming	84	15
Revelations	Released: June 27, 1995; Label: Profile; Formats: CD, LP, cassette, digital download, streaming	107	12
Still Got It Made	Released: October 26, 2004; Label: Semi; Formats: CD, digital download, streaming	—	—
"—" denotes a recording that did not chart or was not released in that territory.

=== Compilation albums ===
List of compilation albums
Title	Album details
The Best of Special Ed	Released: April 14, 2000; Label: BMG Special Products; Formats: CD

=== As lead artist ===
List of singles, with selected chart positions, showing year released and album name
Title	Year	Peak chart positions			Album
Title	Year	US Bub.	US R&B	US Rap	Album
"Think About It"	1989	—	68	—	Youngest in Charge
"I Got It Made"	1989	—	18	9	Youngest in Charge
"Club Scene"	1989	—	—	—	Youngest in Charge
"I'm The Magnificent"	1990	—	37	27	Youngest in Charge
"The Mission"	1990	—	25	5	Legal
"Come On, Let's Move It"	1991	—	30	8	Legal
"Neva Go Back"	1995	9	68	12	Revelations
"Lyrics"	1995	—	—	—	Revelations
"Freaky Flow"	1996	—	—	—	Revelations
"Think Twice" (Note: "Think Twice" was released as a split single with "On Some Next Shit" by A.R.A.B.S. featuring Special Ed)	1997	—	—	—	New York Reality Check 101
"What Up Love?"	1999	—	—	—	Non-album singles
"—" denotes a recording that did not chart or was not released in that territory.

=== Featured singles ===
List of singles as featured artist with selected chart positions, showing year released and album name
Title	Year	Peak chart positions			Album
Title	Year	US	US R&B	US Rap	Album
"Crooklyn" (as part of Crooklyn Dodgers)	1994	60	32	5	Crooklyn Soundtrack
"Something Like This" (DJ Love featuring Special Ed)	2011	—	—	—	Waiting for a Revolution
"Rapzone" (Stezo featuring Special Ed and Tash)	2021	—	—	—	The Last Dance
"—" denotes a recording that did not chart or was not released in that territory.
