= Jay Neugeboren =

American author (born 1938)

Jay Neugeboren (born Jacob Mordecai Neugeboren; May 30, 1938, in Brooklyn) is an American novelist, essayist, and short story writer.

== Education ==
Jay Neugeboren was born in Brooklyn, New York and raised in Flatbush. He went to P.S. 246, Walt Whitman Junior High School (where he was its first president) and Erasmus Hall High School. He received a B.A. in 1959 (as a member of Phi Beta Kappa) from Columbia College and an M.A. in 1963 from Indiana University Bloomington, where he was a University Fellow.

== Career ==
He is the author of 24 books. He has won numerous awards, including fellowships from the National Endowment of the Arts, the Massachusetts Council on the Arts, and the Guggenheim Foundation.

He has taught at Columbia University, Indiana University, Stanford University, the State University of New York at Old Westbury and the University of Freiburg. For many years (1971–2001), he was a professor and writer in residence at the University of Massachusetts Amherst.

== Awards ==
His novella, “Corky’s Brother,” won the Transatlantic Review Novella Award (1969). He has had stories in more than 50 anthologies, including Best American Short Stories, O. Henry Prize Stories, and Penguin Modern Stories.

He has won prizes for his fiction (The Stolen Jew: American Jewish Committee Award for Best Novel of the Year, 1981; Before My Life Began: Edward Lewis Wallant Memorial Prize for Best Novel of the Year, 1985), and non-fiction (Imagining Robert: New York Times Notable Book of the Year; Transforming Madness: National Alliance on Mental Illness, “Ken” Award). He is the only writer to have won six consecutive P.E.N. Syndicated Fiction Awards.

His screenplay for The Hollow Boy (American Playhouse, PBS, 1991, was chosen best screenplay of the year by the Los Angeles Times and the Houston Film Festival.

== Personal life ==
He has been married three times, and has three children.

== Bibliography ==
- After Camus. (Madville Publishing, 2024)
- Whatever happened to Frankie King (Graphic Mundi, 2024)
- Max Baer and the Star of David. (Mandel Vilar Press, 2016)
- Poli: A Mexican Boy in Early Texas. Texas Tech University Press. 2014. (Special 25th Anniversary Edition)
- The Diagnostic Manual of Mishegas, with Michael B. Friedman and Lloyd I. Sederer (2013)
- The American Sun & Wind Moving Picture Company, Texas Tech University Press (2013)
- The Other Side of the World, Two Dollar Radio (2012)
- You Are My Heart and Other Stories, Two Dollar Radio (2011)
- 1940, Two Dollar Radio (2008)
- News From the New American Diaspora and Other Tales of Exile, University of Texas Press (2005)
- (Editor) Hillside Diary and Other Writings by Robert Gary Neugeboren, Center for Psychiatric Rehabilitation (2004)
- Open Heart: A Patient's Story of Life-Saving Medicine and Life-Giving Friendship, Houghton Mifflin (2003)
- Transforming Madness: New Lives for People Living with Mental Illness, William Morrow (1999)
- Imagining Robert: My Brother, Madness, and Survival, Morrow (1997)
- Don't Worry About the Kids: Stories, University of Massachusetts (1992)
- Poli: A Mexican Boy in Early Texas, (with Tom Leamon, illustrator), Corona (1989)
- Before My Life Began, Simon and Schuster (1985)
- The Stolen Jew, Holt Rinehart (1981)
- (Editor) The Story of Story Magazine: A Memoir by Martha Foley, Norton (1980)
- An Orphan's Tale, Holt Rinehart (1976)
- Sam's Legacy, Holt Rinehart (1974)
- Parentheses: An Autobiographical Journey, Dutton (1970)
- Corky's Brother and Other Stories, Farrar Straus (1969)
- Listen Ruben Fontanez, Houghton Mifflin (1968)
- Big Man, Houghton Mifflin (1966)
- American Jewish Biographies, ed. Murray Polner. Lakeville Press, New York, 1982 ISBN 0871964627
