= And the Winner Is... (Chubb Rock album) =

Studio album by Chubb Rock
- Released: 1989
- Genre: Hip hop
- Label: Select
- Producer: Howie Tee

Chubb Rock chronology
Chubb Rock Featuring Hitman Howie Tee (1988)	And the Winner Is... (1989)	Treat 'Em Right (1990)

And the Winner Is... is the second album by the American hip hop musician Chubb Rock, released in 1989. As on Chubb's debut, producer Howie Tee is credited on the album cover.

The album made the top 30 on the Billboard Top R&B Albums. "Ya Bad Chubbs" was a top 20 hit on the Billboard Hot Rap Singles chart, and an early video hit for Yo! MTV Raps. The single peaked at No. 89 on the UK Singles Chart.

== Production ==
The album was produced by Howie Tee. "And the Winner Is...(The Grammys)" is a response to the decision by the National Academy of Recording Arts and Sciences to present the Grammy Award for best rap album before the televised broadcast of the show. Chubb had started composing a version of the track prior to the introduction of the new award category. Barry White appears on the title track.

== Critical reception ==
Professional ratings
Review scores
Source	Rating
AllMusic	4.5/5 stars
The Encyclopedia of Popular Music	4/5 stars
MusicHound R&B: The Essential Album Guide	3.5/5 stars

The Orange County Register deemed And the Winner Is... full of "one dimensional but humorous boasts."

AllMusic thought that the album "featured sharp humor with first-rate samples and production, plus insightful commentary on ghetto violence and the ignorance of the NARAS (National Academy of Recording Arts and Sciences)." MusicHound R&B: The Essential Album Guide called it Chubb's best, writing that it contains "deft production work and some insightful social commentaries that are leavened by Chubb's humorous streak."

== Track listing ==
No.	Title	Length
1.	"Stop That Train"
2.	"What a Difference"
3.	"Same Old Thing"
4.	"Bump the Floor"
5.	"And the Winner Is... (The Grammys)"
6.	"He's Funky"
7.	"Blow the Whistle"
8.	"Caught Up (Remix)"
9.	"She's with Someone"
10.	"Mr. Nobody Is Somebody Now"
11.	"Ya Bad Chubbs"
12.	"Hip Hop Rodeo"
13.	"Gonna Do It for You"
14.	"Nothing Can Stop Us Now"
15.	"Talkin' Loud, Ain't Sayin' Jack"
16.	"Don't Trespass"
