= Sheldon Segal =

American embryologist and biochemist

Sheldon Jerome Segal (March 15, 1926 – October 17, 2009) was an American embryologist and biochemist who spent his entire career working on contraception, and made major innovations in the field of long-lasting alternatives, with Chilean physician Horacio Croxatto, including in the creation of Norplant, the first major development advance in birth control since the birth control pill.

== Early life and education ==
Segal was born on March 15, 1926, in Brooklyn, New York, where he attended Erasmus Hall High School. He enlisted in the United States Navy during World War II when he was 16 years old. He was assigned to an attack transport that was to have been sent for the land invasion of Japan. When the war ended with the atomic bombing of Hiroshima and Nagasaki, obviating the need for naval landings, he was sent to participate in nuclear tests at Bikini Atoll. He left the Navy with the rank of lieutenant (junior grade). After completing his military service, Segal earned a bachelor's degree at Dartmouth College in 1947 and was awarded his doctorate degree from the University of Iowa in 1947 in biochemistry and embryology. In 1986 Segal received an honorary doctorate from the faculty of medicine at Uppsala University, Sweden.

== Contraception career ==
The Population Council hired him in 1956 as assistant medical director for its biomedical research laboratories and he was named as director in 1963. Following a two-year residency in India in the 1960s in which he helped establish a model for women's clinics for family planning that would offer contraceptives and prenatal care and set up the first Department of Reproductive Physiology at the All-India Institute of Medical Sciences in New Delhi, Segal came to the conclusion that his career goal should be "to develop practical advances for women's health".

He established the International Committee for Contraception Research in 1970 to help provide information regarding the development new contraceptives worldwide. He joined the Rockefeller Foundation in 1978 as the organization's first director of the division of population sciences. He was rehired as Distinguished Scientist by the Population Council in 1991, where he chaired the Institutional Review Board and advised program directors.

Segal developed intrauterine devices based on copper and vaginal rings. His best-known work was the creation of Norplant, introduced in 1991 as a contraceptive device that could be inserted under the skin, with its silicone rods releasing progestin for as long as five years. While it offered the benefit of never having to remember to take a pill, side effects included bleeding, hair loss and weight gain. After cases occurred where judges ordered the implant of the device to prevent pregnancy and in the wake of editorials advocating its use "as a way of reducing the welfare burden resulting from high fertility among the underclass", Segal wrote a strongly worded letter to The New York Times in January 1991, indicating that he was "totally and unalterably opposed to the use of Norplant for any coercive or involuntary purpose" and would lead the opposition to use "Norplant for coercive sterilization or birth control". Wyeth-Ayerst Laboratories withdrew the product in 2002 after court cases that argued that a number of major side effects had not been properly disclosed.

In 2003, the intrauterine device Mirena, developed under his leadership of the Center for Biomedical Research, which uses a progestin to thicken cervical mucus to prevent pregnancy was introduced by Berlex Laboratories.

Over the years, he helped convince the Chinese government to use more flexible copper-based IUDs, which led to a reduction in the number of abortions necessitated by the use of one-size-fits all steel IUDs.

He was the author of more than 300 works, including the 1999 book Is Menstruation Obsolete? which he co-wrote with Elsimar M. Coutinho, which argued that there is no health benefit from monthly menstruation. The book stated that early women would menstruate very infrequently because of frequent pregnancies, child nursing and physical demands and that the side effects of the "incessant ovulation" that modern women experience could include anemia and endometriosis.

Segal was awarded the UN Population Award in 1984, sharing it with Carmen Mirro of Panama. In 2006 he won the Prix Galien USA Pro Bono Humanum Prize along with the Population Council for his inventorship of Norplant.

== Personal life and death ==
He was married to novelist Harriet (Feinberg) Segal. The couple had three daughters.

A resident of New York City. Segal died at his summer home in Woods Hole, Massachusetts, at age 83 on October 17, 2009, because of congestive heart failure.
