= Adrianne Tolsch =

American comedian

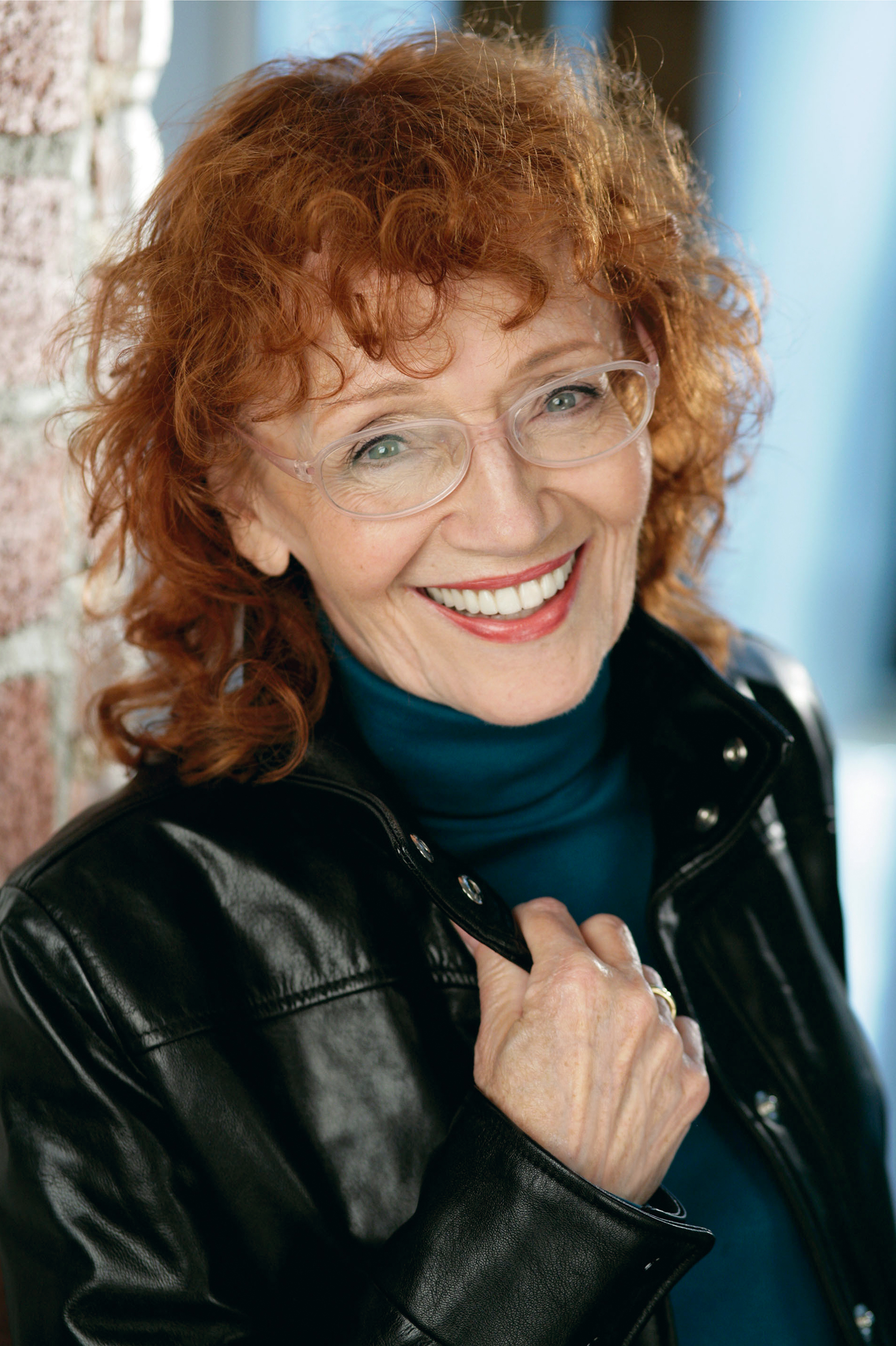
- Adrianne Tolsch in 2014
- Born: October 31, 1938; Brooklyn, New York, US
- Died: December 7, 2016 (aged 78)
- Education: Brooklyn College
- Occupation: Comedian
- Known for: Comedy, Artistry
- Height: 5 ft 4 in
- Spouse: Bill Scheft
- Children: 1
- Awards: New York City MAC Awards Outstanding Female Stand-up Comic (1990, 1991,1994)

Adrianne Tolsch (October 31, 1938 – December 7, 2016) was an American comedian. Tolsch's comedy style is bold, conversational, and covers broad topics. She made jokes about life as a middle-age woman, her sex life, her Jewish identity and Jewish family, and life experiences. She was long associated with the Catch a Rising Star comedy club in New York City, as a performer, club manager, and the club's first woman emcee. She was a headliner at many major comedy clubs in the United States and toured domestically and internationally. She also performed on Broadway and in cabaret shows and was a graphic artist. She was married to fellow comedian and writer Bill Scheft. The two toured together in the United States and co-produced the documentary film Take My Nose... Please!

== Early life and career ==
=== Early life and education ===
Tolsch grew up an only child in the Flatbush neighborhood of Brooklyn. She attended Erasmus Hall High School, and earned a degree in art from Brooklyn College. Her family was Jewish and she identified as Jewish. From a young age she idolized Lenny Bruce, so her father once snuck her into a Bruce show in the Village by claiming she was a midget.

=== Artistry ===
After graduating college, Tolsch's first career was as a graphic artist. Her work consisted of architectural renderings, paintings, drawings, and sculptures from recycled garbage. Her website tolschart displays a mini gallery of her artwork. Aside from being an artist, she also waitressed at a comedy club, Pips, early on in her adult life. Around this time, Tolsch went through a career shift from being an artist to venturing into the world of comedy. People told Tolsch she was comical. She had a love for comedy and making other people laugh. Although she was a successful and talented artist, she went on to pursue her passion in comedy.

=== Stand-up Comedy ===
Tolsch began her comedy career at age 30. In 1976, she began performing improv with The Original Cast troupe before starting in stand-up comedy. Performing had an allure for her. Tolsch stated, "The first time I ever got a standing ovation, you could have taken me right to comic heaven. It was such an affirmation. It's attention, love, it's everything but food and rent."

At that time, there were few women working in standup comedy, and fewer were able to earn a full-time living at it. When Tolsch herself first started in comedy, she kept her day job as a commercial graphic artist while performing at night. During this time, the women comics in New York would often congregate on Sundays at Tolsch's West Side apartment. Tolsch said, "There are so few of us that we need to get together. The camaraderie is essential and we are so all over the lot that we don't get to talk together all that much." She experienced backlash from the public and struggled to find her place in the comedic world. One critic described her stand-up as "bold and brassy" indicating her role as a confident and outspoken woman in comedy was threatening and ahead of the times. During stand-up routines, she got the silent treatment from audience members. She persevered as continued performing stand-up at venues in New York City. She headlined at every major club in NYC.

She eventually became a success in the New York City comedy club circuit, and became the first woman emcee at Catch a Rising Star. She also managed the club for years, and served as a mentor for young comics. She started out by working in the club and checking coats for people. She spent seven nights a week in the club trying to get a chance to perform. She also considered comedian Richard Belzer to be her mentor, as he had helped her get her start at Catch a Rising Star. In 1981 she was the only woman emcee in any of the New York clubs, in part because she was adept at dealing with hecklers.

My name is Tolsch. Tolsch is Russian for 'the yogurt has spoiled.' Where you from? New Jersey? You here for the water? Must be your first time, you ordered the food. We had a nice nonsectarian Christmas at our house. My mother let me hang my earrings from her fern.

— Adrianne Tolsch

== Personal life ==
=== Family and relationships ===
As a young adult, Tolsch left college and married her first husband and had a son named David Kerzner. The two split and she later remarried and divorced her second husband. On December 29, 1980, Tolsch met her future husband, comedian and writer Bill Scheft, when he (at first unsuccessfully) auditioned for her at Catch a Rising Star. She rejected Scheft and it wasn't until his sixth audition for her at the club that he secured a regular gig there as an emcee. The two started dating shortly after. Sheft was a writer for comic star David Letterman, who hosted The Tonight Show and other late night comedy shows. Tolsch and Sheft moved in together in 1984 and married in June 1990. She was an avid crossworder along with Scheft. The two shared a passion for comedy and worked on numerous projects together including a YouTube channel called The Tolscheft and the documentary film Take My Nose... Please!, about women in comedy and the unrealistic expectations of women's appearances. They also toured and performed together at multiple locations across the United States.

She later died of esophageal cancer on December 7, 2016. Aside from Scheft, she was survived by her son, David Kerzner, and a grandson Jonas from her first marriage.

=== Experience as a Woman in Comedy ===
As a woman in comedy, Tolsch faced backlash from people inside and outside of the comedy industry. She opened up about audience members refusing to laugh during her shows and calling her “not funny.” She reports criticism and men trying to break her spirit as a female comedian. She disclosed an experience performing at a comedy club in Savannah, Georgia and none of the audience members laughed during her set. She stated, "it was a moment where I realized it wasn't my content, or my outfit, or my makeup, it was a mindset of the audience. Despite feeling immense push back in a male-dominated industry, she was determined to continue performing stand up as a woman and was highly successful. Women were not very present or represented in the comedy scene during the 1970s and 80s and had to work harder than men to be successful and have the same opportunities.

Her comedy steered away from traditional female comedians. She did not enjoy self-deprecating humor and chose not to perform this style of comedy because she found it boring and not funny. However, early on in her comedy career, she did use self-deprecating humor to be accepted as a female comedian before creating a name for herself.

== Subsequent Activities ==
Tolsch appeared on Broadway in the comedy review 3 From Brooklyn in 1992 at the Helen Hayes Theatre. She also co-hosted a weekly syndicated radio show called The Better Sex.

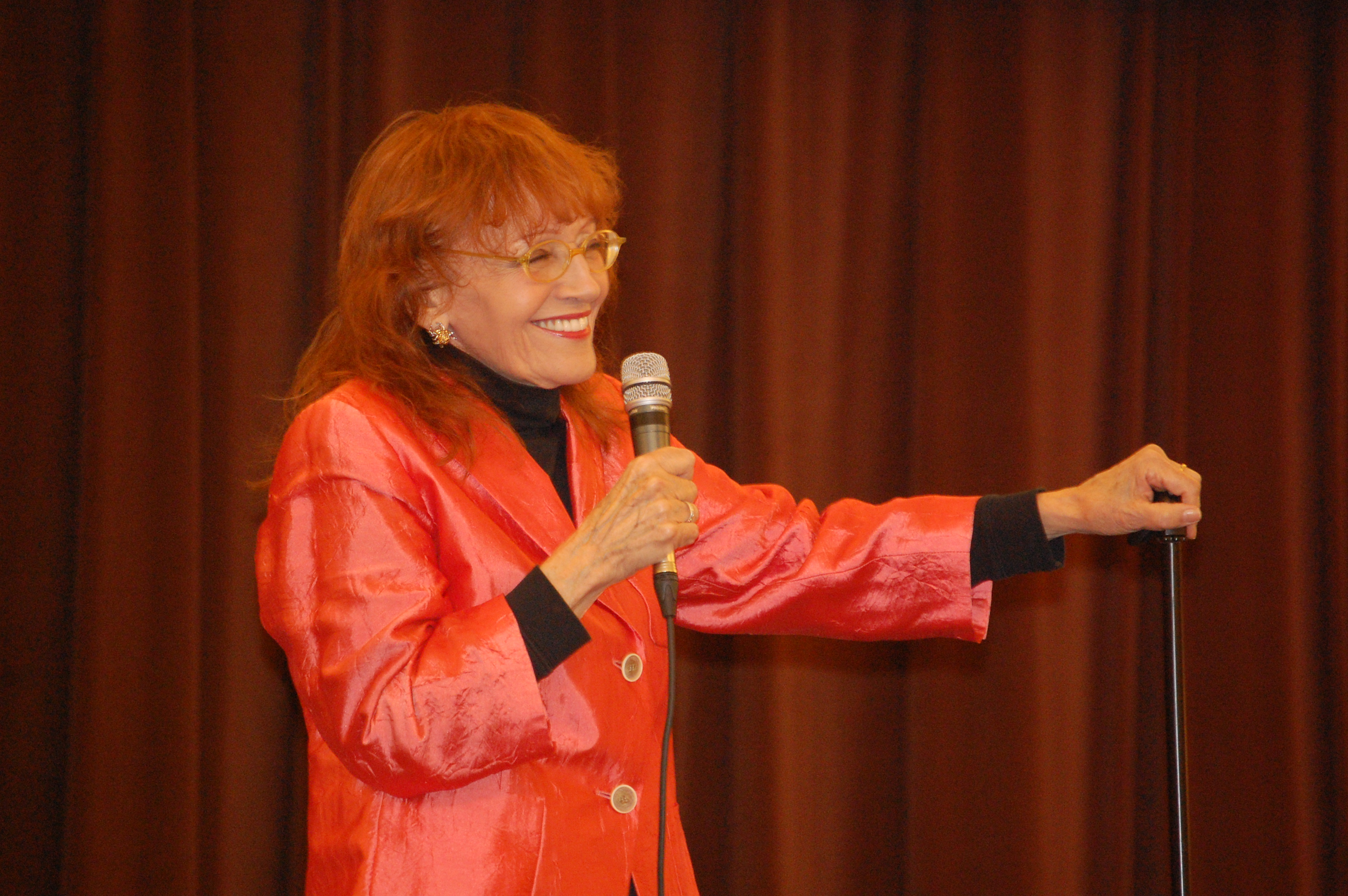
Tolsch on stage Oct 2015

She also co-produced the documentary film Take My Nose... Please! She and her husband co-produced the film during the final years of her life. It explores the experience of women in comedy in a comical light and society's love-hate relationship with plastic surgery and the need to control women's bodies and expression. The film has been appraised by many critics and was a sensation for many.

== Awards and nominations ==
Tolsch won Outstanding Female Stand-Up Comic at New York City's MAC Awards in 1990, 1991 and 1994.

She also received awards for her one-woman cabaret shows Trucks, Guns and Mayonnaise (2004) (which was about her life on the road as a comic} and None of Your Damn Business (2006). In 2004, she received the Cabaret Hotline Award for her performance Trucks, Guns and Mayonnaise and the same award again in 2006 for her show None of Your Damn Business.

The documentary Take My Nose...Please she co-produced with her husband Bill Scheft, won the audience awards at the Miami Film Festival and the Berkshire International Film Festival. The documentary film also won the 2017 Knight Documentary Achievement Award at the Miami International Film Festival.

== Tours ==
Tolsch toured at nearly every major comedy club in New York City, clubs and casinos in Las Vegas, Nevada, Atlanta, Georgia, and others across the United States. She also performed at international venues in London, England, Melbourne, Australia, and Hobart, Tasmania. She opened for comic stars Jay Leno, The Pointer Sisters, Bobby Vinton, Pat Cooper, Chita Rivera, Clint Holmes, and Billy Crystal.
