= Chubb Rock =

Jamaican rapper

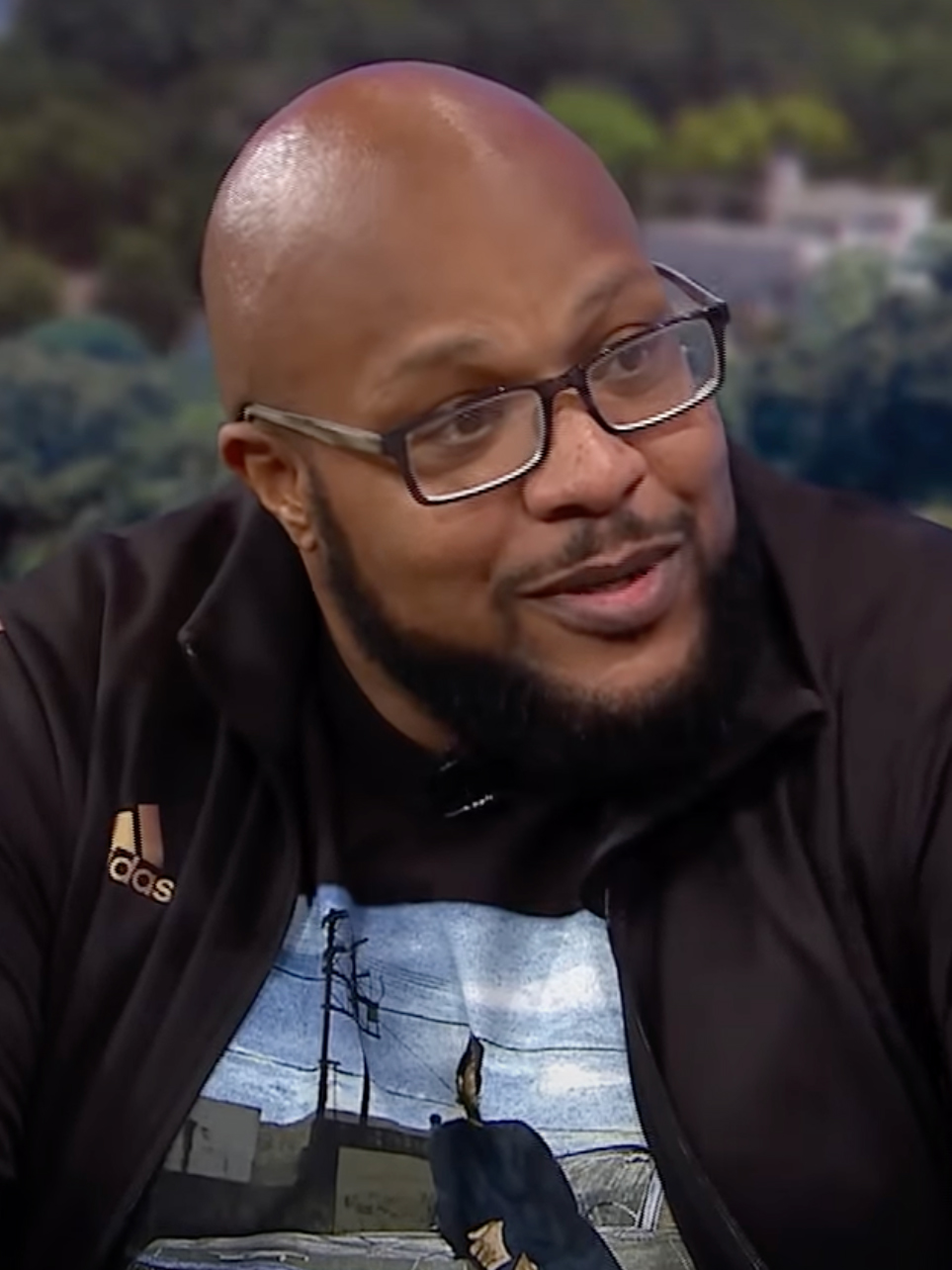
- Chubb Rock in 2019

Background information
- Born: Richard Anthony Simpson; 28 May 1968 (age 58); Kingston, Jamaica
- Origin: Brooklyn, New York City, U.S.
- Genre: East Coast hip-hop
- Years active: 1987–present
- Labels: Hyztory; Select; Champion
- Formerly of: Crooklyn Dodgers

Richard Anthony Simpson (born May 28, 1968), also known as Chubb Rock, is a Jamaican-American rapper who released several successful hip hop albums in the late 1980s and early 1990s. A National Merit Scholar, Chubb Rock dropped out of Brown University to pursue his musical career.

== 1990s and earlier ==
Discovered and produced by his first cousin DJ-Producer Howie Tee, Chubb Rock first appeared on the national scene with his 1988 self-titled debut Chubb Rock and 1989's And the Winner is... The latter produced the minor hit "Ya Bad Chubbs" which garnered air play on Yo! MTV Raps during that time.

His 1990 release entitled The One reached No. 13 on Billboard's Top Hip-Hop/R&B chart for that year. Three singles from that release, "Treat 'Em Right", "Just The Two of Us" and "The Chubbster", made it to No. 1 on Billboard's Top Rap Singles chart list for the same year.

The following year saw the release of I Gotta Get Mine, Yo, a release that featured guest performances from Grand Puba and Poke. This release also helped fledgling music producers Trackmasters, on their rise to prominence, as the group handled production duties on the recording. Chubb Rock also made an appearance on MC Serch's 1992 song "Back to the Grill."

Chubb Rock was a member of the 1995 incarnation of the Crooklyn Dodgers, a hip hop act that also featured OC and Jeru the Damaja. His backup dancers started another group, A.T.E.E.M, which released its debut, A Hero Ain't Nothin' But A Sandwich, in 1992 on Select Records.

In 1996, he appeared on the Red Hot Organization's compilation album America is Dying Slowly, alongside Wu-Tang Clan, Coolio, and Fat Joe, among others. The album, meant to raise awareness of the AIDS epidemic among African American men, was heralded as a masterpiece by The Source magazine.

== 2000s and on ==
Chubb Rock's work in the 2000s has been limited to only a few songs. He appears on a song for Raptivism Records' "No More Prisons" project with Lil' Dap of Group Home and Ed O.G., and also worked with Mr. Len on the song "Dummy Smacks", where he says, "Some people thought I was gone... never that!" He made an appearance alongside Vast Aire on the 2007 Zimbabwe Legit album House of Stone with the song "Wake Up". In 2001, he appeared in the soundtrack for Wet Hot American Summer on the song Summer in America.

In 2008, his single "Treat 'Em Right" was ranked number 82 on VH1's 100 Greatest Songs of Hip Hop. Chubb Rock also released "Obama We Believe" in support of President Obama. His most recent appearance was on the K'naan single "ABC's". He also collaborated with Polish rapper eMCeeM on a track for his album To dopiero poczatek.

In February 2009, the single "Back In" was released, from the album Bridging The Gap, a collaboration with Wordsmith, released on July 14, 2009.

Chubb Rock is featured in the single "Summertime Anthem" by Eric Roberson in which they filmed the music video on the streets of Bed-Stuy, Brooklyn, New York City where he credited his wife and manager, KeKe "Diamond" Simpson, for putting the duo together.

Chubb Rock also released an EP in September 2011. That year, he also appeared with his childhood sweetheart and wife of 24 years, KeKe Simpson on the NBC game show The Marriage Ref.

Chubb Rock moved to Atlanta and joined a radio show hosted by Silas "SiMan Baby" Alexander on Atlanta's Majic 107.5/97.5. On October 26, 2018 they left the station and later started a syndicated afternoon radio show.

== Discography ==
=== Studio albums ===
List of studio albums, with selected chart positions
Title	Album details	Peak chart positions	
Title	Album details	US	US R&B /HH
The One	Released: May 21, 1991; Label: Select; Formats: CD, LP, Cassette, digital download, streaming	71	13
I Gotta Get Mine Yo! (Book of Rhymes)	Released: September 1, 1992; Label: Select; Formats: CD, LP, Cassette, digital download, streaming	127	24
The Mind	Released: May 27, 1997; Label: Select; Formats: CD, LP, Cassette, digital download, streaming	—	45
"—" denotes a recording that did not chart or was not released in that territory.

=== Mixtapes ===
List of mixtapes, with year released
Title	Mixtape details
A Crack in the Bridge (Wordsmith featuring Chubb Rock & The Nu Revolution Camp)	Released: May 13, 2009; Label: HipHopDX; Formats: digital download

=== Collaborative albums ===
List of collaborative albums, with selected chart positions
Title	Album details	Peak chart positions
Title	Album details	US R&B /HH
Chubb Rock (featuring Hitman Howie Tee)	Released: 1988; Label: Select; Formats: CD, LP, Cassette, streaming	54
And the Winner Is... (with Hitman Howie Tee)	Released: 1989; Label: Select; Formats: CD, LP, Cassette, digital download, streaming	28
Obama We Believe (with Shae Fontaine and Michael K)	Released: October 14, 2008; Label: Air Music Group; Formats: digital download, streaming	—
Bridging the Gap (with Wordsmith)	Released: August 11, 2009; Label: GoDigital/Unruly/Koch; Formats: CD	—
"—" denotes a recording that did not chart or was not released in that territory.

=== Extended plays ===
Year	Title	Peak chart positions		Record label
Year	Title	US	US R&B	Record label
1990	Treat 'Em Right	73	22	Select

=== As lead artist ===
List of singles, with selected chart positions
Title	Year	Peak chart positions					Album
Title	Year	US	US Dance	US R&B	US Rap	UK	Album
"Rock 'N Roll Dude" (featuring Hitman Howie Tee & Domino)	1987	—	—	—	—	—	Chubb Rock
"DJ Innovator" (featuring Hitman Howie Tee)	1988	—	—	—	—	—	Chubb Rock
"Caught Up" (featuring Hitman Howie Tee)	1988	—	—	—	—	—	Chubb Rock
"Ya Bad Chubbs" (with Hitman Howie Tee)	1989	—	—	—	15	82	And the Winner Is...
"Stop That Train" (with Hitman Howie Tee)	1989	—	—	—	23	—	And the Winner Is...
"Just the Two of Us"	1990	—	—	20	1	—	The One
"Treat 'Em Right"	1990	95	32	33	1	67	Freddy's Dead: The Final Nightmare Soundtrack and The One
"The Chubbster"	1990	—	8	41	1	—	The One
"The Big Man"	1992	—	—	96	30	—	I Gotta Get Mine Yo
"Lost in the Storm"	1992	—	—	37	1	—	I Gotta Get Mine Yo
"Yabadabadoo"	1993	—	—	—	6	—	I Gotta Get Mine Yo
"Beef"	1997	—	—	—	—	—	The Mind
"Life"	1997	—	—	—	—	—	The Mind
"—" denotes a recording that did not chart or was not released in that territory.

=== Singles ===
Year	Title	Peak chart positions				
Year	Title	US Hot 100	US R&B	US Rap	US Dance	UK
1987	"Rock 'n Roll Dude"	—	—	—	—	—
1988	"DJ Innovator" (with Hitman Howie Tee)	—	—	—	—	—
1988	"Caught Up"	—	—	—	—	—
1989	"Ya Bad Chubbs"	—	—	15	—	82
1989	"Stop That Train"	—	—	23	—	—
1990	"Just the Two of Us"	—	20	1	—	—
1990	"Treat 'Em Right"	95	33	1	32	67
1990	"The Chubbster"	—	41	1	8	—
1992	"The Big Man"	—	96	30	—	—
1992	"Lost in the Storm"	—	37	1	—	—
1993	"Yabadabadoo"	—	—	6	—	—
1996	"I Dream You"					
1997	"Beef"	—	—	—	—	—
1997	"Life"	—	—	—	—	—
2022	"Grown and Sexy (G.a.S.)"	—	—	—	—	—
"—" denotes a recording that did not chart or was not released in that territory.						

=== Guest appearances ===
1990	Channel J	Al B. Sure!	Private Times... and the Whole 9!
1991	Come and Get Your Love (Remix)	Jeff Redd	—N/a
1991	Just Ask Me To	Tevin Campbell	Boyz n da Hood OST
1991	"Keep Control"	Marley Marl, King T, Def Jef, Tragedy Khadafi, Grand Puba	In Control Volume 2
1991	Kick Em in the Grill	3rd Bass	Derelicts of Dialect
1992	Back to the Grill	MC Serch, Nas, Red Hot Lover Tone	Return of the Product
1992	Ooh 4 You Girl	Al B. Sure, Grand Puba	Sexy Versus
1992	Gear	The Real Roxanne	Go Down (But Don't Bite!)
1992	Two Breddrens	Shabba Ranks	X-tra Naked
1996	Party 2 Nite (Fabulous Flava)	Ladae	Non-album single
1996	What Goes Up (Remix)	Mack da Maniak, King Just	Loco-Motive
1998	Way Back We're Going	Just-Ice	VII
1999	"Mr. Large"	Prince Paul, Biz Markie	A Prince Among Thieves
2003	Chubb Rock Can You Please Pay Paul the $2200 You Owe Him (People, Places and Things)	Prince Paul, Wordsworth, MF Doom	Politics of the Business
