= Anthony Parker (musician) =

American singer-songwriter

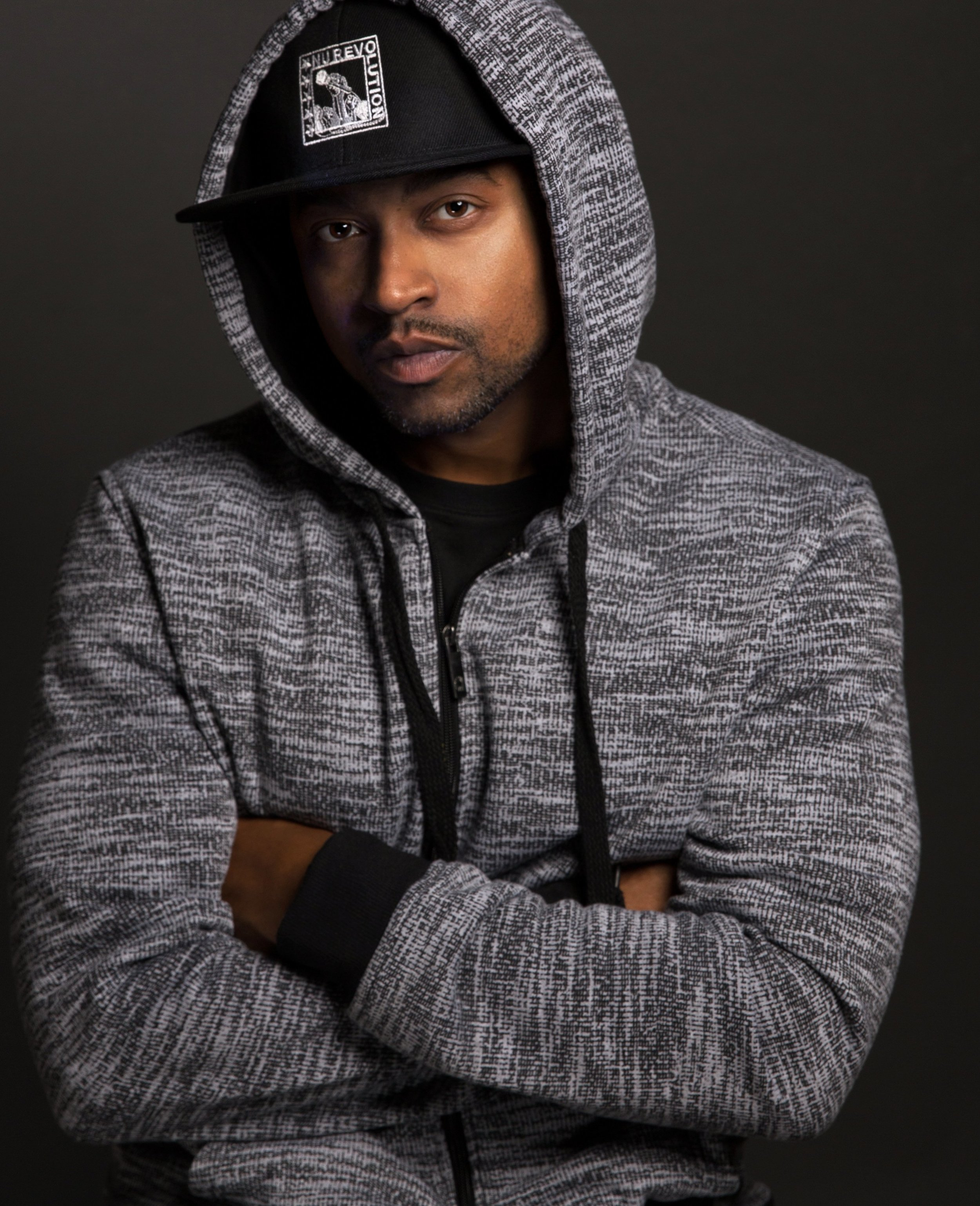
- Born: 1980 (age 45–46); Germany
- Other name: Wordsmith
- Occupations: Singer-songwriter; rapper
- Awards: 2018 Independent Music Award for Best Album - Rap or Hip-Hop

Anthony Parker (born 1980), known by his stage name Wordsmith, is an American hip-hop artist and music label owner. He has released five albums over his career, and is a member of the nominating committee for the Grammy Awards as a songwriter. In 2009, he founded the NU Revolution record label. In 2018, he was the recipient of the Independent Music Award for Best Album - Rap or Hip-Hop for his fifth studio album, Perspective Jukebox.

== Songwriting ==
Wordsmith uses different genres in his musical compositions, including Classical. In addition to his recording career, he founded the NU Revolution recording label in 2009. As a songwriter, he has licensed his music to television, video games, and other mediums—for organizations such as the WWE, ESPN, NFL, Nintendo, CBS, NBC, and FOX. In 2011 Wordsmith also became a songwriter for APM Music, working with companies including ABC, PBS, VH1, the Golf Channel, and Six Flags. He is a member of the nominating committee for the Grammy Awards due to his songwriting credits. Television series that have included his music have included Russian Doll, which used his track "Get What You Love". His music has also been used during television shows including ESPN sports talk show First Take, which featured his song "Energy".

== Albums ==
Wordsmith's first album was Vintage Experience, released in 2010. He also released Bridging The Gap, a collaborative record created with Chubb Rock of the group the Crooklyn Dodgers. Several of his albums were co-produced by Jerome Smith since 2011. In 2012 Wordsmith released the album King Noah. Songs from the album were licensed by the NFL Network, MLB Network and CiCi's Pizza. In 2013 Wordsmith release his third album, The Blue Collar Recital. The concept of the album is to track the normal moments of the day for a blue collar worker. In 2015 he released his fourth album Apt. 507. In 2017 Wordsmith released his fifth album, Perspective Jukebox. The album received the Independent Music Award for Best Album - Rap or Hip-Hop in 2018. Reviews of the work have called it “substantial ... expressing disgust over greed and modern day values.” The album reached number 58 on Amazon's top Hip-Hop albums sales chart. In 2021 he released his first jazz album Progressions, composed with Kory Caudill, and performed alongside them in a concert following the launch.

== Performances ==
While touring, Wordsmith travels with a live band. He has made stops in Asia, Europe, Africa, and the Americas. He also performs for US service members at military bases overseas. In his home town of Baltimore, he co-organizes music events with the Concert Artists of Baltimore. Wordsmith has also partnered with the Baltimore Symphony Orchestra, acting as narrator in public performances and performing spoken word during a 2020 performance of Beethoven's Ninth Symphony. He has also emceed other events for the organization. In 2020 he performed at the Carnegie Hall as a part of the ensemble that presented the show All Together: A Global Ode to Joy. In 2020 he was named to the Baltimore Symphony Orchestra Artistic Team, to “serve as an advisor and collaborator, presenting original orchestral projects throughout the season” according to Baltimore Magazine. In 2021 he narrated the commissioned work Destined Words at the symphony, written by James Lee III.

== Personal life ==
Wordsmith was born in 1980 while his father was stationed in Germany and eventually became a native from Baltimore at the age of 19. He currently lives in the Mount Vernon area and is the father of two children.
