= Youngest in Charge =

Studio album by Special Ed
- Released: 1989
- Recorded: 1988–89
- Studio: Howie's Crib (New York, NY); Q's House (Brooklyn, NY)
- Genre: Hip hop
- Length: 49:19
- Label: Profile
- Producer: Howie Tee

Special Ed chronology
Youngest in Charge (1989)	Legal (1990)

Singles from Youngest in Charge
- 1. "I Got It Made" Released: 1989; 2. "Think About It" Released: 1989; 3. "I'm the Magnificent" Released: 1990

Professional ratings
Review scores
Source	Rating
AllMusic	4.5/5 stars

Youngest in Charge is the debut studio album by hip hop musician Special Ed, from Brooklyn. It was released in 1989 through Profile Records. The recording sessions took place at Howie's Crib and at Q's House in New York. The album was produced by Howie Tee. It peaked at number 73 on the Billboard 200 albums chart in the United States. Ed was 16 when he recorded the album.

In 1998, the album was selected as one of The Source's "100 Best Rap Albums".

== Track listing ==
All tracks are written by Edward K. Archer and Howard Anthony Thompson.

No.	Title	Length
1.	"Taxing"
2.	"I Got It Made"
3.	"I'm the Magnificent"
4.	"Club Scene"
5.	"Hoedown"
6.	"Think About It"
7.	"Ak-Shun"
8.	"Monster Jam"
9.	"The Bush"
10.	"Fly M.C."
11.	"Heds and Dreds"

== Charts ==
Chart (1989)	Peak position
US Billboard 200	73
US Top R&B/Hip-Hop Albums (Billboard)	8
