= Itapoã (neighborhood) =

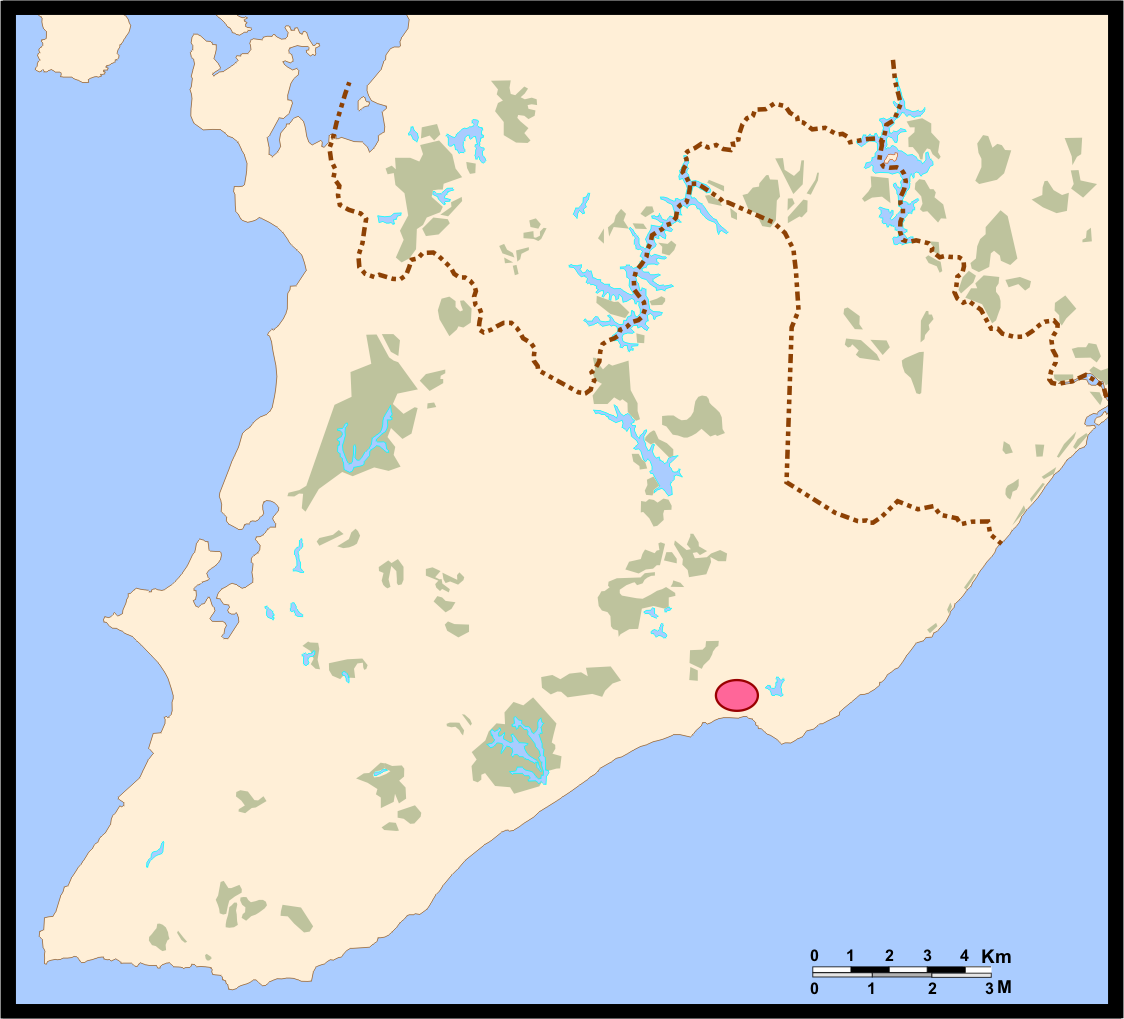
Location of Itapoã.

Itapoã or Itapuã is a neighborhood located in the western zone of Salvador, Bahia.

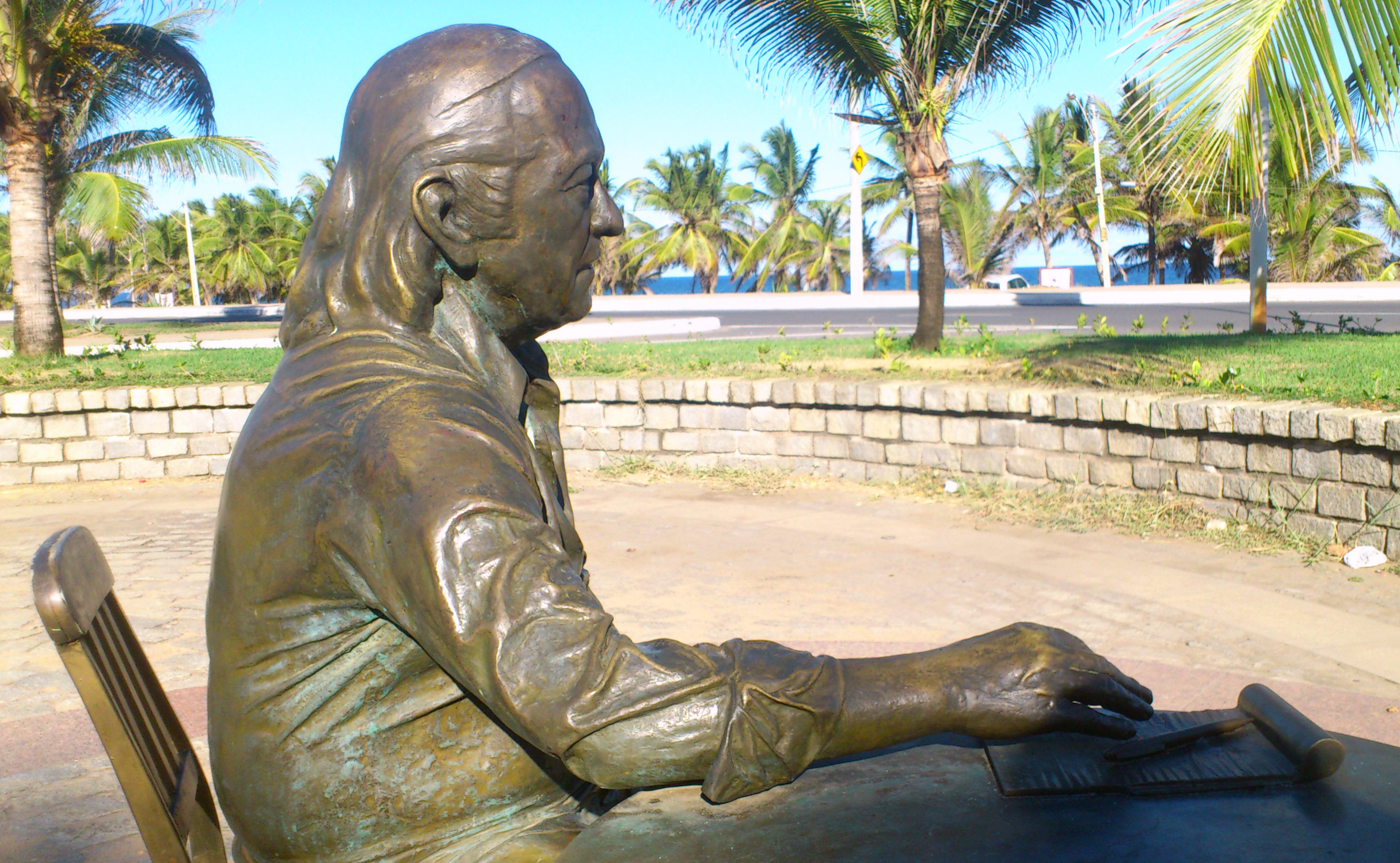
Sculpture in honour of Vinícius de Moraes in Itapoã.

Itapoã is where Dona Flor (from the Jorge Amado novel Dona Flor and Her Two Husbands) gave up her virginity to the scoundrel who was to become her first husband. It was also home to poet/playwright/lyricist Vinícius de Moraes for a number of years, and composer Dorival Caymmi. Vinícius, together with his collaborator Toquinho, wrote and performed "Uma tarde em Itapoã", an evocative hymn to the bucolic village of the time.

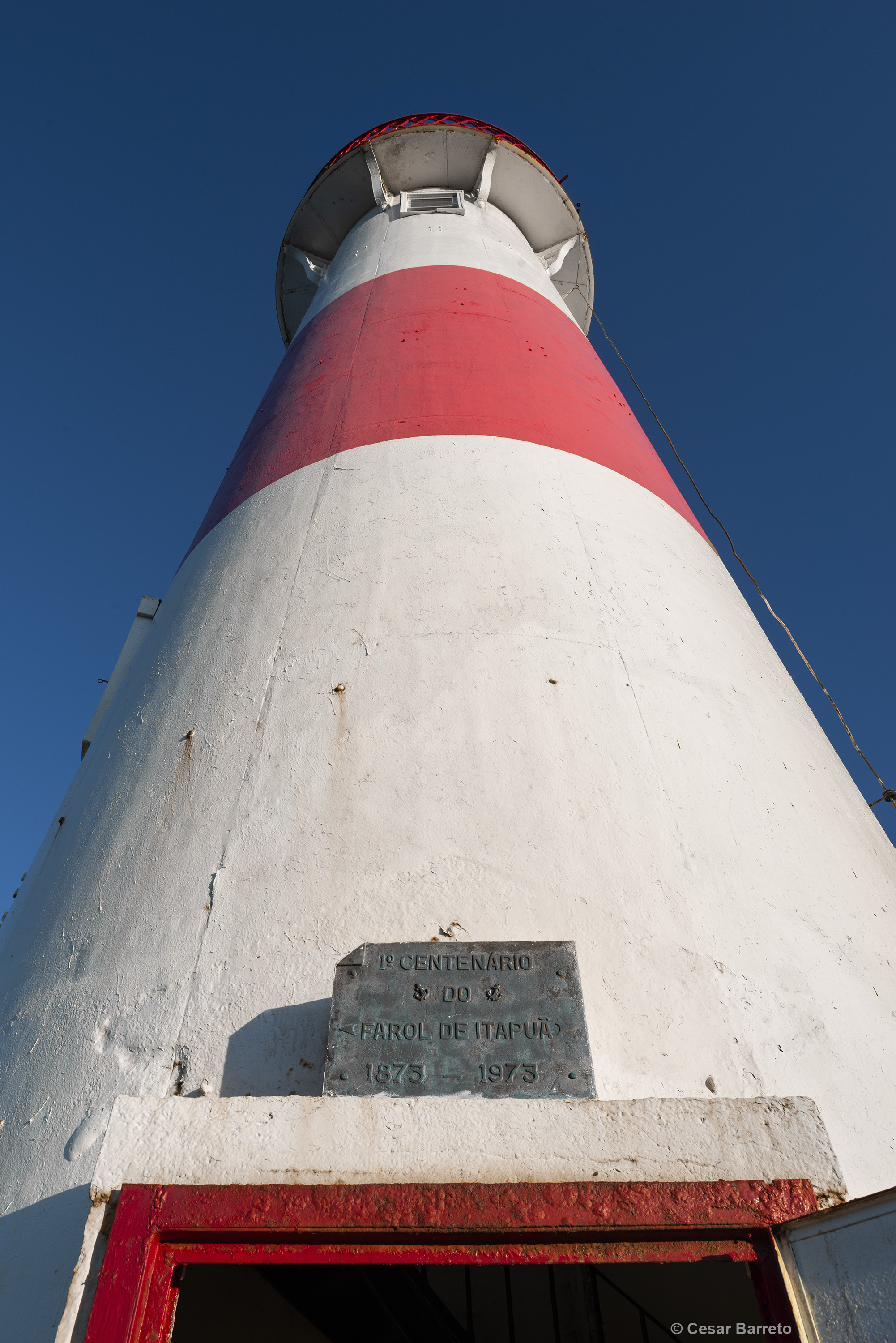
Lighthouse Itapuã
