= Howie Tee =

American DJ (1964–2025)

- Also known as: Hitman Howie Tee; Howie Tee
- Born: Howard Anthony Thompson; February 2, 1964; London, England
- Origin: New York City, U.S.
- Died: August 2, 2025 (aged 61) U.S.
- Genres: Hip-hop; pop
- Occupation(s): Songwriter, producer
- Years active: 1983–2025

Howard Anthony Thompson (February 2, 1964 – August 2, 2025), better known as Hitman Howie Tee or Howie Tee, was an English-born American hip-hop DJ and producer of Jamaican origin. He was best known for his work with U.T.F.O, Chubb Rock, Special Ed, and The Real Roxanne.

== Life and career ==
Howie Tee was born in London, England, to West Indian parents and was raised in East Flatbush, Brooklyn, New York, United States.

Howie Tee got his start in the early 1980s as a member of the electro hip-hop group CDIII, who released two singles on Prelude Records. Howie, along with Kangol Kid of U.T.F.O, produced the group Whistle, best known for the 1985 song "(Nothing Serious) Just Buggin'". He then became the in-house producer for New Jersey-based independent label Select Records. He produced "I Got It Made" by Special Ed and "Treat em' Right" by Chubb Rock. In 1991, he mixed and co-produced the Billboard #1 "I Wanna Sex You Up" by Color Me Badd. He also made remixes for Madonna, Heavy D, Maxi Priest, and Little Shawn, among others.

Howie Tee mentored a teenaged Spencer Bellamy, who went on to release the underground hip-hop classic "Tried By 12" under the name East Flatbush Project.

=== Death ===
Tee died at the age of 61, on August 2, 2025, in the United States.

== Discography ==
=== Albums ===
Year	Album	Peaks
Year	Album	US R&B
1988	Chubb Rock Featuring Hitman Howie Tee (Chubb Rock featuring Hitman Howie Tee)	54
1989	And the Winner Is... (Chubb Rock with Howie Tee)	28

=== Singles ===
Year	Song	Chart positions	
Year	Song	US R&B	US Rap
1983	"Get Tough" (CDIII)	–	–
1984	"Success" (CDIII)	–	–
1985	"Romeo Part 1" (The Real Roxanne with Hitman Howie Tee)	64	–
1986	"Bang Zoom (Let's Go-Go)" (The Real Roxanne with Hitman Howie Tee)	24	–
1986	"Howie's Teed Off" (The Real Roxanne with Hitman Howie Tee)	–	–
1987	"Rock N' Roll Dude" (Chubb Rock and Domino with Hitman Howie Tee)	–	–
1988	"DJ Innovator" / "I Feel Good" (Chubb Rock with Hitman Howie Tee)	–	–
1989	"Ya Bad Chubbs" (Chubb Rock with Howie Tee)	–	15
"–" denotes releases that did not chart.

=== Singles produced ===
Year	Song	Chart positions			
Year	Song	US Hot 100	US R&B	US Rap	US Dance
1985	"(Nothing Serious) Just Buggin'" (Whistle)	–	17	–	18
1985	"2-4-6-8/Here We Are" (Crash Crew)	–	–	–	–
1986	"Just For Fun" (Whistle)	–	61	–	–
1986	"Santa Is A B-Boy" (Whistle)	–	92	–	–
1987	"They Call Me Puma" (Seeborn & Puma)	–	–	–	–
1987	"Barbara's Bedroom" (Whistle)	–	31	–	–
1987	"Back Rappin'" (E.S.P.)	–	–	–	–
1987	"Don't Let The Music Stop" (MC Miker G)	–	–	–	–
1987	"Heartbreak Hotel" (Little Shawn)	–	–	–	–
1988	"Respect" (The Real Roxanne)	–	55	–	–
1988	"Soul Man" (Isidore aka Izzy Ice)	–	–	–	–
1988	"DJ Innovator" / "I Feel Good" (Chubb Rock with Hitman Howie Tee)	–	–	–	–
1988	"Wild Thing" (E.S.P.)	–	–	–	–
1989	"I Got It Made" (Special Ed)	–	18	9	–
1989	"Ya Bad Chubbs" (Chubb Rock with Howie Tee)	–	–	15	–
1989	"Right Next To Me" (Whistle)	60	52	–	–
1989	"Think About It" (Special Ed)	–	68	–	–
1989	"Stop That Train" (Chubb Rock)	–	–	23	–
1990	"I'm The Magnificent" (Special Ed)	–	37	27	–
1990	"Treat 'Em Right" (Chubb Rock)	95	33	1	32
1990	"The Mission" (Special Ed)	–	25	5	–
1990	"Come On, Let's Move It" (Special Ed)	–	30	8	–
1991	"The Chubbster" (Chubb Rock)	–	41	1	8
1991	"I Wanna Sex You Up" (Color Me Badd)	2	1	–	–
1991	"All 4 Love" (Color Me Badd)	1	–	–	–
1991	"Just the Two of Us" (Chubb Rock)	–	20	1	–
1991	"Slow Motion" (Color Me Badd)	15	10	–	–
1992	"Hickeys On Your Chest" (Little Shawn)	–	–	11	–
1992	"The Big Man" (Chubb Rock)	–	96	30	–
1992	"Fingertips (Clap Your Hands)" (E.S.P.)	–	–	–	–
1992	"I Made Love (4 Da Very 1st Time)" (Little Shawn)	–	–	28	–
1992	"Heartbreaker" (Color Me Badd)	57	32	–	–
1993	"Romantic Call" (Patra featuring Yo-Yo)	55	35	9	21
1993	"In The Sunshine" (Color Me Badd)	–	–	–	–
1994	"The Glock" (Vicious)	–	–	–	–
1994	"The Choice Is Yours" (Emage)	–	81	–	–
1995	"Neva Go Back" (Special Ed)	–	68	12	–
1995	"One Little Indian" (Little Indian)	–	–	–	–
"–" denotes releases that did not chart or were not released in that territory.
