= Last Night (Kid 'n Play song) =

1987 single by Kid 'n Play

Single by Kid 'n Play

from the album 2 Hype
- B-side: "The Herb Rock Beats"
- Released: 1987
- Genre: Hip hop
- Length: 4:27
- Label: Select (US); Cooltempo/ Chrysalis (UK); Rhythm (NED)
- Songwriter(s): Christopher Martin; Christopher Reid; Hurby Azor
- Producer(s): Hurby "Lovebug"

Kid 'n Play singles chronology
"She's A Skeezer" (1986)	"Last Night" (1987)	"Do This My Way" (1988)

"Last Night" is a single by the American hip hop duo Kid 'n Play, released in 1987 via Select Records. It is their first single as "Kid 'n Play" (previously songs were released under the name Fresh Force/The Fresh Force Crew). It was included on their debut album 2 Hype, released the following year. Produced by Hurby "Luv Bug" Azor, who also has writing credits for the song alongside the members of duo, in the song they narrate about an unfortunate double date.

It also became the duo's first song to appear on a major chart, reaching No. 71 on the UK Singles Chart in July of that year.

In 1999, Ego Trip's editors ranked "Last Night" at No. 33 in their list of Hip Hop's 40 Greatest Singles by Year 1987 in Ego Trip's Book of Rap Lists.

== Content and composition ==
Produced by Hurby "Luv Bug" Azor, who also has writing credits for the song alongside the members of duo, in the song they narrate about an unfortunate double date.

=== Samples ===
"Last Night" contains vocal samples from Esther Williams's "Last Night Changed It All (I Really Had a Ball)" and The Brothers Johnson's "Ain't We Funkin' Now", the bass from Cloud One's "Patty Duke", drums from Dexter Wansel's "Theme from the Planets", The Main Melody From Ain’t Nobody By Chaka Khan, and the hook and Riff From Funky President by James Brown
