= UTFO discography =

Catalog of published recordings by the band UTFO

This article presents the discography of UTFO, an American hip hop group composed of Kangol Kid (born Shaun Shiller Fequiere; August 10, 1966 – December 18, 2021), Educated Rapper (EMD) (born Jeffrey Campbell; July 4, 1963 – June 3, 2017), Doctor Ice (born Fred Reeves on March 2, 1966), and Mix Master Ice (born Maurice Bailey on April 22, 1965).

== Studio albums ==
List of studio albums, with selected chart positions
Title	Album details	Peak chart positions	
Title	Album details	US	US R&B /HH
UTFO	Released: 1985; Label: Select; Formats: CD, LP, cassette, digital download	80	11
Skeezer Pleezer	Released: 1986; Label: Select; Formats: CD, LP, cassette	142	14
Lethal	Released: 1987; Label: Select; Formats: CD, LP, cassette	67	2
Doin' It!	Released: 1989; Label: Select; Formats: CD, LP, cassette	143	30
Bag It & Bone It	Released: February 5, 1991; Label: Jive/U.T.F.O. Records; Formats: CD, LP, cassette, digital download	—	—
"—" denotes a recording that did not chart or was not released in that territory.

== Singles ==
=== As lead artist ===
List of singles and selected chart positions, showing year released and album name
Title	Year	Peak chart positions				Album
Title	Year	US	US Dance	US R&B	UK	Album
"Beats and Rhymes"	1984	―	―	―	―	UTFO
"Hangin' Out"	1984	―	―	―	―	UTFO
"Roxanne, Roxanne"	1984	77	40	10	72	UTFO
"The Real Roxanne" (with The Real Roxanne)	1984	—	—	44	—	UTFO
"Leader of the Pack"	1985	—	43	32	―	UTFO
"Bite It"	1985	―	—	79	―	UTFO
"Pick Up the Pace"	1985	―	―	―	―	Skeezer Pleezer
"Fairy Tale Lover"	1985	―	—	36	―	Skeezer Pleezer
"Split Personality"	1986	―	—	50	―	Skeezer Pleezer
"We Work Hard"	1986	―	―	―	―	Skeezer Pleezer
"Ya Cold Wanna Be with Me"	1987	―	—	43	―	Lethal
"Lethal" (featuring Anthrax)	1987	―	―	―	―	Lethal
"Let's Get It On"	1988	―	―	―	―	Lethal
"Wanna Rock"	1989	―	―	―	―	Doin' It!
"Rough & Rugged"	1989	―	―	―	―	Doin' It!
"If You Don't Wanna Get Pregnant"	1990	―	―	―	―	Bag It & Bone It
"I'm a Dog"	1991	―	―	―	―	Bag It & Bone It
"Lollipop" (with The Real Roxanne, featuring Syncere)	1998	—	—	—	—	The Best of U.T.F.O.
"—" denotes releases that did not chart or were not released in that territory.

=== Compilation albums ===
- The Best of U.T.F.O. (Select, 1996)
- Skeezer Pleezer/Lethal (BCM, 2000)
