= The Real Roxanne =

American rapper (born 1967)

- Also known as: Roxanne; Joanne Martinez
- Born: Adelaida Martinez; January 11, 1967 (age 59); Brooklyn, New York City, U.S.
- Genre: Hip-hop
- Occupation: Emcee
- Instrument: Vocals
- Years active: 1984–present
- Label: Select

Adelaida Martinez (born January 11, 1967), better known by her stage name the Real Roxanne, is an American female hip-hop MC who recorded for Select Records.

Martinez was born in Brooklyn, New York. In the 1980s, she, the producer of Roxanne Shante, and others were engaged in the Roxanne Wars, a series of answer records inspired by UTFO's hit song "Roxanne, Roxanne", being the officially sanctioned artist in response to all of the answer records. She scored her biggest hit in 1986 by teaming up with Howie Tee on the single "Bang Zoom (Let's Go Go)", which reached No. 11 on the UK singles chart, her only UK top-40 song to date.

== Career ==
The role of the Real Roxanne was originally filled by a different woman, Elease Jack, who recorded the first single "The Real Roxanne" under the character's name. Meanwhile, Martinez claims to have been introduced to UTFO in a fashion very similar to the Roxanne story. Already acquainted with Paul Anthony George, a member of Full Force, the group that produced UTFO:

Ironic[ally] enough, I briefly met Doc Ice and Kangol (Kid) at the Albee Square Mall in Brooklyn, and, like Roxanne, I paid them no mind when they tried to get their rap on. All this was taking place while Paul Anthony and I were just becoming friends. Full Force was looking for someone to play the permanent role of Roxanne, even though they had already cut the track with someone they picked out of a club, whom, by the way, had absolutely no rap experience. They utilized her for an answer back to outbid Roxanne Shante's track. It seems that while they tried to create this character, they were having issues with this individual and her mother, so I was told, and that's when I was asked by Paul Anthony if I would audition for the guys, and I said sure, and I did. And, from there, I kept on walking in the shoes of THE REAL Roxanne!'

== Discography ==
=== Studio albums ===
List of albums, with selected chart positions
Title	Album details	Peak chart positions
Title	Album details	US R&B /HH
The Real Roxanne	Released: 1988; Label: Select; Formats: CD, LP, Cassette, digital download	30
Go Down (But Don't Bite It) (Note: Published as "Roxanne")	Released: April 17, 1992; Label: Select/Elektra; Formats: CD, LP, Cassette	—
"—" denotes a recording that did not chart or was not released in that territory.

=== Singles ===
==== As lead artist ====
List of singles with selected chart positions, showing year released and album name
Title	Year	Peak chart positions				Album
Title	Year	US R&B	BEL	NLD	UK	Album
"Romeo Part I & Part II" (With Hitman Howie Tee)	1985	64	—	—	—	Non-album single
"Bang Zoom (Let's Go Go)" (With Hitman Howie Tee)	1986	24	—	—	11	The Real Roxanne
"Respect"	1988	55	27	24	71	The Real Roxanne
"Roxanne's on a Roll"	1988	80	40	42	80	The Real Roxanne
"Ya Brother Does"	1992	—	—	—	—	Go Down (But Don't Bite It)
"Lollipop" (with UTFO, featuring Syncere)	1998	—	—	—	—	The Best of U.T.F.O.
"I Can't"	2019	—	—	—	—	Non-album single
"—" denotes a recording that did not chart or was not released in that territory.

==== Promotional singles ====
List of singles, showing year released and album name
Title	Year	Album
"Howie's Teed Off" (with Hitman Howie Tee)	1986	The Real Roxanne

=== Guest appearances ===
List of non-single guest appearances, with other performing artists, showing year released and album name
Title	Year	Other artist(s)	Album
"Undercover"	1988	Kid 'n Play	2 Hype
