= Ain't Gonna Hurt Nobody =

1991 single by Kid 'n Play

Single by Kid 'n Play

from the album Face the Nation and House Party 2
- Released: August 22, 1991
- Genre: Hip hop
- Length: 4:45
- Label: Select; Elektra
- Songwriters: Christopher Reid; Regi Hargis Hickman; Eric Johnson
- Producer: Eric Johnson

Kid 'n Play singles chronology
"Back to Basix" (1990)	"Ain't Gonna Hurt Nobody" (1991)	"Slippin'" (1991)

"Ain't Gonna Hurt Nobody" is a song performed by American hip hop group Kid 'n Play. It was issued as the first single from their third studio album Face the Nation, as well as appearing on the soundtrack to the film House Party 2. The song samples the Brick song of the same name, as well as "Funky President (People It's Bad)" by James Brown.

Co-written by group member Christopher "Kid" Reid, "Ain't Gonna Hurt Nobody" was the group's only single to chart on the Billboard Hot 100, peaking at number 51 on the chart in 1991. It was also the group's second single to peak at number one on the Billboard rap chart.

The song was also made available on a cassette table in select boxes of Kellogs Cinnamon Mini Bun cereal.

== Chart positions ==
Chart (1991–1992)	Peak position
US Billboard Hot 100	51
US Hot Dance Music/Maxi-Singles Sales (Billboard)	18
US Hot R&B/Hip-Hop Singles & Tracks (Billboard)	26
US Hot Rap Singles (Billboard)	1
