= House Party 2 (soundtrack) =

House Party 2: Original Motion Picture Soundtrack

Soundtrack album by various artists
- Released: October 15, 1991
- Recorded: 1991
- Studios: Cherokee Studios (Los Angeles, CA); Groove Asylum Recording Co. (Evanston, IL); Enterprise Studios (Los Angeles, CA); Institute Of Groove Research (Malibú, CA); Entourage Studios (Los Angeles, CA); Unique Recording Studios (New York, NY)
- Genres: Hip hop; R&B
- Length: 54:42
- Label: MCA
- Producers: Eric B. & Rakim; Eric "Quicksilver" Johnson; Eric "Vietnam" Sadler; Hank Shocklee; Keith Shocklee; Kevin Dorsey; Laney Stewart; London Jones; Marley Marl; Scratch & Source Productions, Inc.; Teddy Riley; Tony! Toni! Toné!

Professional ratings
Review scores
Source	Rating
AllMusic	3/5 stars

House Party 2: Original Motion Picture Soundtrack is the soundtrack to the 1991 American comedy film House Party 2. It was released on October 15, 1991, through MCA Records after Motown was sold to PolyGram. The soundtrack consisted of a blend of hip hop and contemporary R&B with audio excerpts from the film.

Production was handled by Teddy Riley, Tony! Toni! Toné!, Eric B. & Rakim, Eric "Quicksilver" Johnson, Eric "Vietnam" Sadler, Hank Shocklee, Keith Shocklee, Kevin Dorsey, Laney Stewart, London Jones, Marley Marl and Scratch & Source Productions, Inc. Louil Silas Jr. together with film directors Doug McHenry and George Jackson served as executive producers.

It features contributions from film stars Kid 'n Play, Bell Biv DeVoe, Bubba, Chanté Moore, Eric B. & Rakim, Keith Washington, London Jones, Ralph Tresvant, The Flex, Tony! Toni! Toné!, Wreckx-n-Effect, and the final recording from rapper MC Trouble, who died from an epileptic seizure several months before the soundtrack's release.

Serving as a sequel to 1990's House Party (soundtrack), the album is generally considered an improvement over the first, making it to No. 55 on the Billboard 200 and No. 23 on the Top R&B/Hip-Hop Albums, and featured the charting singles: Kid 'N Play's "Ain't Gonna Hurt Nobody", Tony! Toni! Toné!'s "House Party II (I Don't Know What You Come to Do)" and Ralph Tresvant's "Yo Baby Yo".

== Track listing ==
House Party 2 track listing
No.	Title	Writer(s)	Producer(s)	Length
1.	"Announcement of Pajama Jammi Jam" (performed by Kid 'n Play)			0:16
2.	"House Party II (I Don't Know What You Come to Do)" (performed by Tony! Toni! Toné!)	D'wayne Wiggins; Raphael Wiggins	Tony! Toni! Toné!	5:17
3.	"The Christopher Robinson Scholorship Fund" (performed by Kid 'n Play)			0:12
4.	"Ready or Not" (performed by Wreckx-n-Effect)	Aqil Davidson; Theodore Riley	Teddy Riley; Wreckx-n-Effect (co.)	5:11
5.	"Kid 'N Play Wreck Shop!" (performed by Martin Lawrence)			0:04
6.	"Ain't Gonna Hurt Nobody" (performed by Kid 'n Play)	Chris Reid; Eric Johnson; Regi Hargis Hickman	Eric "Quicksilver" Johnson	4:46
7.	"I Like Your Style" (performed by Bubba)	Frederick Lee Drakeford; T. Riley; Davidson	Teddy Riley	4:55
8.	"Kid & Sydney Break Up" (performed by Kid and Tisha Campbell)			0:18
9.	"Candlelight and You" (performed by Keith Washington and Chanté Moore)	Chanté Moore; Philip Lane Stewart; Tony Haynes	Laney Stewart	5:19
10.	"I Lust 4 U" (performed by London Jones)	London Jones	Kevin Dorsey; London Jones	4:28
11.	"Bilal Gets Off" (performed by Martin Lawrence)			0:19
12.	"Let Me Know Something?!" (performed by Bell Biv DeVoe)	Darrol Durant; Roney Hooks; Eric Sadler; Keith Boxley	Eric "Vietnam" Sadler; Hank Shocklee; Keith Shocklee	4:54
13.	"Yo Baby Yo" (performed by Ralph Tresvant)	R. Wiggins; Timothy Christian Riley	Raphael Saadiq; Timothy Christian Riley	4:57
14.	"The F.F.F. Rap" (performed by Full Force and Helen Martin)			0:31
15.	"What's on Your Mind?" (performed by Eric B. & Rakim)	William Griffin; Eric Barrier	Eric B. & Rakim	5:00
16.	"Big Ol' Jazz" (performed by MC Trouble)	LaTasha Rogers	Scratch & Source Productions, Inc.	3:46
17.	"You Gotta Pay What You Owe" (performed by Kid 'n Play)			0:11
18.	"It's So Hard to Say Goodbye to Yesterday" (performed by The Flex)	Christine Yarian; Frederick Perren	Marley Marl; The Flex (co.)	3:25
19.	"Confidence by Marcus Garvey" (performed by Georg Stanford Brown)			0:14
20.	"It's So Hard to Say Goodbye to Yesterday (Acapella Reprise)" (performed by The Flex)	Yarian; Perren		0:37
21.	"Kid's Goodbye "Thanks to Pops"" (performed by Kid)			0:03
Total length:				54:42

== Personnel ==
- Christopher Reid – performer (tracks: 1, 3, 6, 8, 17, 21), engineering & executive producer (track 6), co-executive producer
- Christopher Martin – performer (tracks: 1, 3, 6, 17), co-executive producer
- Tony! Toni! Toné! – performers & producers (track 2)
- John "Jubu" Smith – producer & arranger (track 2)
- Maceo Parker – saxophone (track 2)
- John "L.A. Jay" Barnes III – additional programming (track 2), drum overdubs (tracks 13)
- Ken Kessie – recording & mixing (tracks: 2, 13)
- Louil Silas Jr. – remixing (tracks: 2, 13), backing vocals (track 16), executive producer, A&R
- Victor Flores – remixing engineer (tracks: 2, 13)
- Wreckx-n-Effect – performers & co-producers (track 4)
- Lee "Bubba" Drakeford – lead and backing vocals (tracks: 4, 7)
- Teddy Riley – backing vocals, producer & mixing (tracks: 4, 7)
- Jean-Marie Horvat – mixing & engineering (tracks: 4, 7)
- Martin Lawrence – performer (tracks: 5, 11)
- Khadejia Bass – additional vocals (track 6)
- Jeffrey Bynes – keyboards (track 6)
- Stanley Brown – keyboards (track 6)
- Alain Blake – guitar (track 6)
- Eric "Quicksilver" Johnson – producer & engineering (track 6)
- Yanni Papadopoulos – engineering (track 6)
- Tammy Lucas – backing vocals (track 7)
- Tisha Campbell – performer (track 8)
- Chanté Moore – lead and backing vocals (track 9)
- Keith Washington – performer (track 9)
- Laney Stewart – backing vocals & producer (track 9)
- Tony Haynes – associate producer (track 9)
- Thaddis "Kuk" Harrell – vocal arranger & recording (track 9)
- Eric G. Sproull – recording (track 9)
- Marty Hornberg – engineering assistant & recording (track 9)
- Alan Meyerson – mixing (track 9)
- London Jones – performer & producer (track 10)
- Kevin Dorsey – keyboards & producer (track 10)
- Andrew Brown – recording (track 10)
- Elliott Peters – mixing (track 10)
- Bell Biv DeVoe – performers (track 12)
- Hank Shocklee – producer & remixing (track 12)
- Eric "Vietnam" Sadler – producer (track 12)
- Keith Shocklee – producer (track 12)
- Gary G-Wiz – remixing (track 12)
- Kurt Yano – remixing engineer (track 12)
- Ralph Tresvant – performer (track 13)
- Charles Ray "Raphael Saadiq" Wiggins – backing vocals & producer (track 13)
- Belma Johnson – backing vocals (track 13)
- Rhonda Randall – backing vocals (track 13)
- Timothy Christian Riley – producer (track 13)
- Kimm James – remixing assistant (track 13)
- Full Force – performers (track 14)
- Helen Martin – performer (track 14)
- William "Rakim" Griffin – performer & producer (track 15)
- Eric Barrier – performer & producer (track 15)
- Lee Anthony – engineering (track 15)
- Mark Harder – engineering (track 15)
- LaTasha "MC Trouble" Rogers – performer (track 16)
- Kevin "K-Cut" McKenzie – producer (track 16)
- Anton Pukshansky – engineering (track 16)
- Charles Rogers – executive producer (track 16)
- The Flex – performers & co-producers (tracks: 18, 20)
- Darren Lighty – keyboard programming (track 18)
- Marley Marl – producer (track 18)
- George Karras – mixing (track 18)
- Georg Stanford Brown – performer (track 19)
- Eddy Schreyer – mastering
- Doug McHenry – executive producer
- George Jackson – executive producer
- Miriam Barnes – art direction, artwork
- Ilene Weingard – art direction

== Chart positions ==
House Party 2 chart performance
Chart (1991)	Peak position
Australian Albums (ARIA)	138
US Billboard 200	55
