= Bitch Betta Have My Money (song) =

1991 single by AMG

Single by AMG

from the album Bitch Betta Have My Money
- Released: November 22, 1991
- Genre: Hip hop
- Length: 3:15
- Label: Select
- Songwriter: Jason Lewis
- Producer: AMG

AMG singles chronology
| "Bitch Betta Have My Money" (1991) | "Jiggable Pie" (1991) |

"Bitch Betta Have My Money" is the debut single by American rapper AMG and the lead single from his 1991 debut studio album of the same name. It is his most successful song.

== Composition ==
Lyrically about sex and finding a partner, the song contains samples of "Listen to Me" by Al Wilson, "Pimpin' Ain't Easy" by Big Daddy Kane "A Bitch iz a Bitch" by N.W.A and "Bring the Noise" by Public Enemy.

== Samples ==
British electronica group Hardknox sampled "Bitch Betta Have My Money" on their single "Who's Money?".

American rapper Ludacris also borrowed three lines of lyrics for his song "Area Codes".

== Critical reception ==
Stanton Swihart of AllMusic called the song a "classic bit of disrespectful smack-talk". Steve "Flash" Juon of Rap Reviews wrote the song "was so provocative and funny it was a guaranteed hit. Was AMG pimping hoes to collect that dough? Hell no. AMG was selling himself TO hoes".

Complex and The Ringer included the song in their respective lists of the 100 and 101 best L.A. rap songs.

== Charts ==
| Chart (1991) | Peak position |
|---|---|
| US Hot Rap Songs (Billboard) | 5 |
