= Funhouse (Kid 'n Play album) =

Studio album by Kid 'n Play
- Released: March 13, 1990
- Recorded: 1989–1990
- Studio: Bayside Sound Recording Studio (New York, NY); Soundcheck Studio (New York, NY)
- Genre: Dance rap
- Length: 50:06
- Label: Select
- Producer: Hurby Luv Bug; the Invincibles

Kid 'n Play chronology
2 Hype (1988)	Funhouse (1990)	Face the Nation (1991)

Singles from Funhouse
- 1. "Back To Basix" Released: 1990; 2. "Funhouse (The House We Dance In)" Released: 1990

Professional ratings
Review scores
Source	Rating
AllMusic	4/5 stars
Robert Christgau	(dud)
Entertainment Weekly	B−
The Rolling Stone Album Guide	2/5 stars

Funhouse is the second and penultimate album by American hip hop duo Kid 'n Play. It was released on March 13, 1990, through Select Records. The recording sessions took place at Bayside Sound Recording Studio and at Soundcheck Studio in New York. The album was produced by Hurby "Luv Bug" Azor and the Invincibles. It features a guest appearance from Salt-N-Pepa.

The album reached number 58 on the Billboard 200 and number 11 on the Top R&B/Hip-Hop Albums. It was certified Gold by the Recording Industry Association of America on June 12, 1992. The album spawned two singles, "Funhouse" from House Party (Original Motion Picture Soundtrack), which peaked at No. 27 on the Hot R&B/Hip-Hop Songs and topped the Hot Rap Songs chart, and "Back to Basics", which peaked at No. 69 on the Hot R&B/Hip-Hop Songs and No. 16 on the Hot Rap Songs. The song "Toe to Toe" was released as a promotional single.

== Track listing ==
All tracks are written by Hurby Azor.

Funhouse track listing
No.	Title	Producer(s)	Length
1.	"Energy"	Fingerprints; Eric "Quicksilver" Johnson (co.)	3:56
2.	"Y U Jellin' Me"	Fingerprints; Wizard M.E. (co.); "The Grand Composer" Dre (co.)	4:28
3.	"Back to Basics"	Fingerprints; Stanley Brown (co.)	4:24
4.	"Toe to Toe"	Fingerprints; Dana Mozie (co.)	4:20
5.	"Show 'Em How It's Done"	Fingerprints; Steve Azor (co.)	5:09
6.	"I Don't Know" (featuring Salt-N-Pepa)	Fingerprints; Stanley Brown (co.)	3:59
7.	"So Whatcha Want 2"	Fingerprints; Dana Mozie (co.)	5:00
8.	"Strokin'"	Fingerprints; Wizard M.E. (co.)	4:23
9.	"Can't Get Enuff"	Fingerprints; Eric "Quicksilver" Johnson (co.)	4:27
10.	"Decisions"	Fingerprints; Dana Mozie (co.); Christopher Martin (co.)	4:30
11.	"Fun House"	Fingerprints; Stanley Brown (co.)	5:30
Total length:			50:06

== Personnel ==
- Christopher Reid – main artist
- Christopher Martin – main artist, co-producer (track 10)
- Salt-N-Pepa – featured artists (track 6)
- Hurby "Luv Bug"/"Fingerprints" Azor – backing vocals, producer
- Robin Feinberg – backing vocals
- Glenn D. Gibson – guitar
- Stanley Aaron Brown – keyboards, co-producer (tracks: 3, 6, 11)
- Eric "Quicksilver" Johnson – co-producer (tracks: 1, 9)
- The Wizard M.E. – co-producer (tracks: 2, 8)
- "The Grand Composer" Dre – co-producer (track 2)
- Dana Mozie – co-producer (tracks: 4, 7, 10)
- Steve Azor – co-producer (track 5)
- Andre DeBourg – engineering
- Amy Bennick – art direction

== Charts ==
Funhouse chart performance
Chart (1990)	Peak position
US Billboard 200	58
US Top R&B/Hip-Hop Albums (Billboard)	11

== Certifications ==
Funhouse certifications
Region	Certification	Certified units/sales
United States (RIAA)	Gold	500,000^{^}
^{^} Shipments figures based on certification alone.
