= Kid 'n Play (TV series) =

American animated cartoon series

- Developed by: John Semper; Cynthia Friedlob
- Starring: Christopher Reid; Christopher Martin
- Voices of: J. D. Hall; Brian Stokes Mitchell
- Opening theme: "Rollin' With Kid 'n Play" performed by Kid 'n Play
- Composers: Haim Saban; Shuki Levy
- Country of origin: United States
- Original language: English
- No. of seasons: 1
- No. of episodes: 13

Production
- Executive producers: Winston Richard; Ellen Levy-Sarnoff; Maynell Thomas; Joe Taritero
- Production companies: Marvel Productions; Saban Entertainment

Original release
- Network: NBC
- Release: September 8 – December 8, 1990

Kid 'n Play is a 1990 American animated television series based on the real-life hip hop duo Kid 'n Play. It ran for one season on NBC from September 8 to December 8, 1990. On the show, Kid 'n Play were portrayed as teenagers, along with their friend Jazzy, their producer Hurbie and their DJ Wiz, but their recording careers remained the same as in real life, as did their character traits. Production was by Marvel Productions and Saban Entertainment.

The real Kid 'n Play appeared in live-action wraparounds of the cartoons, but voice actors took over for the animated versions of the duo. The show stressed positive role models, teaching children how to get along with each other and stay out of trouble. Akin to the House Party films, Play was the less responsible member of the duo, cooking up get rich quick schemes, while Kid, the more responsible member, would usually be made to clean up messes. Oftentimes the issue would be resolved by the characters' girlfriends, or sometimes by an elderly jazz musician who wore a blue beret and was aptly named "Old Blue". Also along the crew is Kid's Mohawk pet dog Hairy. The lessons ranged from serious to lighter fare. One of the "less serious" episodes dealt with Kid's father under the impression hip hop is bad and Kid not having the means to put it in a positive light. Old Blue offers to help by sending Kid on a trip back in time to the era of jazz and 1920s speakeasies to help better understand its roots.

Marvel Comics published a tie-in comic book which ran for nine issues in 1992.

The series was created by John Semper Jr. and Cynthia Friedlob who also served as the show-runners and head-writers. They would later go on to write Kid 'N Play's third live-action feature, Class Act, for Warner Bros. Semper would later produce and be the head-writer for "Spider-Man: The Animated Series," for Marvel Films Animation. It was cancelled after one season as George H. W. Bush signed a deal to require educational programming for children in the following season.

Ownership of the series passed to Disney in 2001 when Disney acquired Fox Kids Worldwide, which also includes Marvel Productions.

== Cast ==
- Christopher "Kid" Reid as himself (live-action segments)
- Christopher "Play" Martin as himself (live-action segments)
- Mark "DJ Wiz" Eastmond as himself (live-action segments)
- Salt-N-Pepa as themselves (live-action segments)
- Kool Moe Dee as himself (live-action segments)
- Tony! Toni! Tone! as themselves (live-action segments)
- DJ Spinderella as herself (live-action segments)

=== Voices ===
- Jack Angel
- Tommy Davidson as Jazzy, Acorn
- Chris Hooks as Christopher Reid
- J. D. Hall as Pitbull, Mr. Reid
- Dorian Harewood as Old Blue
- Martin Lawrence as DJ Wiz, Hurbie
- Dawnn Lewis as Lela
- Brian Stokes Mitchell as Christopher Martin
- Danny Mann as Hairy
- Rain Pryor as B.B.
- Humberto Ortiz (credited as Umberto Ortiz)
- Alaina Reed
- Terri Semper
- Cree Summer as Marika, Downtown, Carrie

=== Additional voices ===
- Charlie Adler
- Susan Blu
- Tom McHugh
- Rob Paulsen
- Les Tremayne
- Janet Waldo
- Patric Zimmerman

== Episodes ==
| No. | Title | Original release date |
|---|---|---|
| 1 | "Play's Place" | September 8, 1990 |
| 2 | "Flip Your Kid Wig" | September 15, 1990 |
| 3 | "Rap-O-Mania" | September 22, 1990 |
| 4 | "There's No Business Like Dough Business" | September 29, 1990 |
| 5 | "One Kid and a Baby" | October 6, 1990 |
| 6 | "Rapped Around His Little Finger" | October 13, 1990 |
| 7 | "Not What It's Rapped Up to Be" | October 20, 1990 |
| 8 | "Tap to the Rap" | October 27, 1990 |
| 9 | "Say It, Don't Spray It" | November 3, 1990 |
| 10 | "Jump Street Jazzy" | November 10, 1990 |
| 11 | "Quantum Rap" | November 17, 1990 |
| 12 | "Project Creeper Sweeper" | December 1, 1990 |
| 13 | "Jazzman Jazzy" | December 8, 1990 |
