= Cloud One =

Cloud One may refer to:

- Cloud One (band), New York disco-soul studio band 1976-1978
- Cloud One, project of Mick Moss 2010
- Cloud One (album), Live Skull
- The Cloud One, sub-brand of the hotel brand Motel One.
