= House Party (soundtrack) =

House Party: Original Motion Picture Soundtrack

Soundtrack album by various artists
- Released: March 9, 1990
- Recorded: 1989–1990
- Studios: Mastersound Recording Studios (Atlanta, GA); Romil Recording (Cambria Heights, NY); Sigma Sound (New York, NY); Skyline Studios (New York, NY); Greene St. Recording (New York, NY); Bayside Sound Recording Studio (New York, NY); Marley's House (Spring Valley, NY); Pearl Street Studios (Brooklyn, NY)
- Genres: Pop rap; R&B
- Length: 45:57
- Label: Motown
- Producers: Reginald Hudlin (exec.); Warrington Hudlin (exec.); Artz & Kraftz; Charles Ernst; Eric "Vietnam" Sadler; Full Force; Gene Griffin; Hurby Luv Bug; Kenny Pollock; Kenny Vaughan; Marley Marl; The Invincibles

Professional ratings
Review scores
Source	Rating
AllMusic	3/5 stars 1.5/5 stars
RapReviews	4/10

House Party: Original Motion Picture Soundtrack is the soundtrack album to Reginald Hudlin's 1990 musical comedy film House Party. It was released through Motown on March 9, 1990 along with the film, and consisted of a blend of hip hop and R&B music. Recording sessions took place at Mastersound Recording Studios in Atlanta, and New York-based studios Romil Recording, Sigma Sound Studios, Skyline Studios, Greene Street Recording Studio, Bayside Sound Recording Studio, Marley's House, Pearl Street Studios. Production was handled by Gene Griffin, Hurby "Luv Bug" Azor, The Invincibles, Artz & Kraftz, Charles Ernst, Eric "Vietnam" Sadler, Full Force, Hank Shocklee, Keith Shocklee, Kenny Pollock, Kenny Vaughan and Marley Marl, with film director Reginald Hudlin and film producer Warrington Hudlin served as executive producers. It features contributions from film stars Kid 'n Play, as well as Artz & Kraftz, Cheryl Pepsii Riley, E-Crof, Ex-Girlfriend, Flavor Flav, Force MDs, Kenny Vaughan, Lisa Lisa and Cult Jam, LL Cool J, Marley Marl, The Art of Love, Today and UTFO.

The soundtrack made it to number 104 on the Billboard 200 and number 20 on the Top R&B Albums chart in the United States.

It preceded two sequel albums: 1991's House Party 2 and 1994's House Party 3.

== Track listing ==
House Party track listing
No.	Title	Producer(s)	Length
1.	"Why You Get Funky on Me" (performed by Today)	Gene Griffin
2.	"What a Feeling" (performed by Artz & Kraftz)	Artz & Kraftz
3.	"Jive Time Sucker" (performed by Force MDs)	Gene Griffin
4.	"House Party" (performed by Lisa Lisa and Cult Jam, UTFO, Cheryl Pepsii Riley, Ex-Girlfriend and E-Crof)	Full Force
5.	"This Is Love" (performed by Kenny Vaughan and The Art of Love)	Charles Ernst; Kenny Pollock; Kenny Vaughan
6.	"Can't Do Nuttin' for Ya, Man!" (performed by Flavor Flav)	Eric "Vietnam" Sadler; Hank Shocklee
7.	"Fun House" (performed by Kid 'n Play)	Hurby Luv Bug; The Invincibles
8.	"To da Break of Dawn" (performed by LL Cool J and Marley Marl)	Marley Marl
9.	"Kid Vs. Play (The Battle)" (performed by Kid 'n Play)	Hurby Luv Bug; The Invincibles
10.	"I Ain't Going Out Like That ^{[a]}" (performed by Zan)	Gene Griffin
11.	"Surely ^{[a]}" (performed by Artz & Kraftz)	Artz & Kraftz
12.	"Ain't My Type of Hype ^{[b]}" (performed by Full Force)
13.	"Always and Forever ^{[b]}" (performed by Heatwave)

Notes

- ^{^[a]} signifies bonus track(s) appeared on CD only
- ^{^[b]} signifies bonus track(s) from 2015 reissue

=== Other songs ===
- The following songs did appear in the film, but were not included in the soundtrack:
1. "Bad Boy/Having a Party" written by Luther Vandross, Marcus Miller, Sam Cooke and performed by Luther Vandross
2. "Hey Love" written by Wilber Hart and performed by The Delfonics (prod. by Stan Watson & Company)
3. "Run 4 Cover" written and performed by Eric B. & Rakim
4. "Shake It Up" written by Marcus Miller, Lenny White, Bernard Wright and performed by the Jamaica Boys
5. "Niggerish" written by Andre Foxxe Williams, Tracey Lewis and performed by Parliament
6. "Bull Pen Blues" written by Hurby Azor, performed by Kid 'n Play (prod. by Hurby "Love Bug" Azor and The Invincibles)

== Chart positions ==
House Party chart performance
Chart (1990)	Peak position
US Billboard 200	104
US Top R&B/Hip-Hop Albums	20
