= Split Personality =

Split Personality may refer to:

== Mental ==
- Dissociative identity disorder, previously known as multiple personality disorder, is a dissociative disorder characterized by the presence of at least two personality states.

== Music ==
- Split Personality (Cassidy album), 2004
- Split Personality (All-4-One album), a 2004 album released by the R&B group All-4-One
- Split Personality, a 2006 album by Mila J
- Split Personality (Russian: Раздвоение Личности), a 2007 album by Splean
- Split Personalities (album), by 12 Rods, 1998
- "Split Personality", a song by UTFO from the 1986 album Skeezer Pleezer
- "Split Personality", a song by Pink from the 2000 album Can't Take Me Home
- "Split Personality", a song by Skye Sweetnam from the 2004 album Noise from the Basement

== Television ==
=== Episodes ===
- "Split Personalities", Stretch Armstrong and the Flex Fighters season 2, episode 6 (2018)
- "Split Personalities", Telenovela episode 9 (2016)
- "Split Personalities", The Spooktacular New Adventures of Casper season 2, episode 4b (1996)
- "Split Personality", Land of the Lost season 2, episode 12 (1975)
- "Split Personality", Phineas and Ferb season 2, episode 61 (2010)
- "Split Personality", Tales from the Crypt season 4, episode 11 (1992)
- "Split Personality", The Love Boat season 4, episode 19b (1981)
- "Split Personality", The Mask: Animated Series season 1, episode 15 (1995)
- "The Split Personality", The Flintstones season 1, episode 5 (1960)

=== Shows ===
- Split Personality, a 1959 American game show hosted by Tom Poston
- Split Personality (game show), a 1967 Australian television series

== Other uses ==
- Split Personalities (video game), 1986
