= The Real Roxanne (album) =

Studio album by the Real Roxanne
- Released: 1988
- Genre: Rap
- Label: Select
- Producer: Full Force, Jam Master Jay, L.A. Posse, Andy Panda, Howie Tee

The Real Roxanne chronology
The Real Roxanne (1988)	Go Down (But Don't Bite It) (1992)

The Real Roxanne is the debut album by the American musician the Real Roxanne, released in 1988. It peaked at No. 30 on Billboard's Top Black Albums chart. "Respect", which peaked at No. 55 on Billboard's Hot Black Singles chart, was released as the first single. Roxanne supported the album by opening for DJ Jazzy Jeff & the Fresh Prince, Boogie Down Productions, and Public Enemy on separate live dates.

== Production ==
Roxanne wrote or cowrote all of the songs on The Real Roxanne. It was produced by Howie Tee, Jam Master Jay, L.A. Posse, Andy Panda, and Full Force. The recording sessions were delayed due to Roxanne's separation from Full Force. By the time of its release, there were more female rappers with recording contracts, leading Roxanne to view her album as a springboard to other business endeavors. "Early Early" is about how rapping is just another career choice. "Roxanne's on a Roll" samples the Lyn Collins song "Think (About It)". "Don't Even Feel It" samples the "Theme from Shaft"; it was cowritten by Special Ed and was his first credit. The sound of "Bang Zoom (Let's Go-Go)" was influenced by go-go music; it was also the first major rap song to adopt William DeVaughn's "gangasta lean" phrase. The song samples the Isley Brothers and Warner Bros. Cartoons characters. "Respect" features a guest appearance from Rodney Dangerfield. Roxanne was inspired to write it due to her conflicted feelings about diss tracks directed toward female rappers and her desire to be a role model to her daughter.

== Critical reception ==
Professional ratings
Review scores
Source	Rating
All Music Guide to Hip-Hop	4/5 stars
Robert Christgau	A−
The Encyclopedia of Popular Music	4/5 stars

The Potters Bar Times admired "Roxanne's on a Roll" but opined that the album "gives way to monotony, as the rhythm becomes ... predictable". Of "Roxanne's on a Roll", the Manchester Evening News praised the "stuttering samplers" and lyrics that "slag off everyone in the same line of work." Robert Christgau, alluding to the Roxanne Wars, wrote, "Roxanne Shanté's the real Roxanne. This one's the real Lisa Lisa—smart, fast-talking, Puerto Rican and proud, up on the get down."

Spin opined that Roxanne "may be hip hop's Blondie—creating completely compelling, completely contrived produit ... while possessing a refined yet lust-inducing glamour". Simon Frith, in The Observer, said that Roxanne is "exhilarating in the confidence with which she out-talks anything the backing tracks throw up, seeing off the hardest beats, choosing her own moments of sweetness." The Daily Telegraph dismissed Roxanne's "murky beats and relentlessly self-praising raps."

The Trouser Press Record Guide stated that, "with fine, sample-heavy old-school production by the likes of Jam Master Jay and Howie Tee, The Real Roxanne is irascible nasty-girl fun, a salty set of boasts, putdowns and don't-mess-wid-the-Ro' antagonism." The All Music Guide to Hip-Hop called the album "a stunning debut".

== Track listing ==
No.	Title	Length
1.	"Roxanne's on a Roll"
2.	"Look but Don't Touch"
3.	"Early Early"
4.	"Infatuated"
5.	"Luv Scandal"
6.	"Bang Zoom (Let's Go-Go)"
7.	"Don't Even Feel It"
8.	"Her Bad Self"
9.	"Get Up on the Get Down"
10.	"Oh Darlin' (Like We Used To)"
11.	"Respect"
12.	"Howie's Teed Off"
13.	"Rap to Me"
