= Bitch Betta Have My Money =

Studio album by AMG
- Released: December 3, 1991
- Studios: Skip Saylor; Kitchen Sync Studios (Los Angeles, CA)
- Genre: Dirty rap
- Length: 51:27
- Label: Select
- Producer: AMG

AMG chronology
| Give a Dog a Bone (1991) | Bitch Betta Have My Money (1991) | Ballin' Outta Control (1995) |

Singles from Bitch Betta Have My Money
- 1. "Bitch Betta Have My Money" Released: 1991; 2. "Jiggable Pie" Released: 1991; 3. "I Wanna Be Yo Ho" Released: 1992; 4. "The Vertical Joyride" Released: 1992

Professional ratings
Review scores
| Source | Rating |
|---|---|
| AllMusic | 4.5/5 stars |
| RapReviews | 7.5/10 |
| The Source | 3.5/5 |

Bitch Betta Have My Money is the debut full-length studio album by American rapper AMG. It was released on December 3, 1991, through Select Records. Recording sessions took place at Skip Saylor and at Kitchen Sync Studios in Los Angeles. Production was handled by AMG himself with co-producers Courtney Branch and Tracy Kendrick and additional producer DJ Quik. It features contributions from Bo$$, 2nd II None, Sylk Smoov and Tesa Wallace.

In the United States, the album peaked at number 63 on the Billboard 200 and number 20 on the Top R&B/Hip-Hop Albums charts. It received a gold certification by the Recording Industry Association of America on September 28, 1994 for selling 500,000 copies in the US alone.

== Track listing ==
All tracks are written by Jason Lewis, except track 8 is written with Lichelle Laws, and track 10 is written with Courtney Branch.

| No. | Title | Length |
|---|---|---|
| 1. | "The Vertical Joyride" | 2:30 |
| 2. | "Word 2 tha D" | 3:03 |
| 3. | "I Wanna Be Yo Ho" | 2:51 |
| 4. | "When She Calls" | 0:41 |
| 5. | "Once a Dawg" | 3:21 |
| 6. | "Jiggable Pie" | 3:19 |
| 7. | "P-Funk" | 0:57 |
| 8. | "Mai Sista Izza Bitch" | 3:00 |
| 9. | "La Queeda" | 0:24 |
| 10. | "Vertical Interlude" | 2:26 |
| 11. | "Bitch Betta Have My Money" | 3:15 |
| 12. | "Lick 'Em Low Lover" | 2:02 |
| 13. | "Sylk's Cellular" | 0:28 |
| 14. | "Nu Exasize" | 3:43 |
| 15. | "Backseat Queenz" | 3:28 |
| 16. | "Givva Dogga Bone" | 2:54 |
| 17. | "Yo Momma Told Me..." | 3:14 |
| 18. | "Trunk o' Funk" | 3:34 |
| 19. | "Tha Booty Up" | 3:29 |
| 20. | "My Ho, My Kids" | 0:21 |
| 21. | "D. Control" | 2:34 |
| Total length: | | 51:27 |

| No. | Title | Length |
|---|---|---|
| 22. | "I Wanna Be Yo Ho" (Remix) | 4:34 |

== Personnel ==
- Jason "AMG" Lewis – vocals, producer, arrangement, mixing
- Deon "Gangsta D" Barnett – background vocals (tracks: 2, 19)
- Kelton "KK" McDonald – background vocals (tracks: 2, 19)
- Tesa Wallace – additional vocals (track 4)
- Lichelle "Bo$$" Laws – vocals (track 8)
- Floyd "Sylk Smoov" Harrison – additional vocals (track 13)
- Robert "Fonksta" Bacon – guitar, bass
- Courtney Branch – bass (track 10), co-producer, engineering, mixing, executive producer
- Stymie – harmonica solo (track 15)
- Tracy Kendrick – co-producer, engineering, mixing, executive producer
- David "DJ Quik" Blake – additional producer (track 14)
- Louie Teran – engineering assistant
- Mats Blomberg – engineering assistant
- Greg Jessie – executive producer
- Chris Gehringer – mastering
- Michael Britto – photography

== Charts ==
=== Weekly charts ===
| Chart (1992) | Peak position |
|---|---|
| US Billboard 200 | 63 |
| US Top R&B/Hip-Hop Albums (Billboard) | 20 |

=== Year-end charts ===
| Chart (1992) | Position |
|---|---|
| US Top R&B/Hip-Hop Albums (Billboard) | 54 |

== Certifications ==
| Region | Certification | Certified units/sales |
|---|---|---|
| United States (RIAA) | Gold | 500,000^{^} |
^{^} Shipments figures based on certification alone.
