= Your Big Break =

- Created by: Henny Huisman
- Written by: Fred Bronson; Tracy Abbott
- Directed by: Barry Glazer
- Presented by: Christopher "Kid" Reid (1999-2000); Alfonso Ribeiro (2000-2001)
- Theme music composer: Edgar Struble
- Country of origin: United States
- No. of seasons: 2
- No. of episodes: 44

Production
- Executive producers: Dick Clark; Marc Jansen
- Producers: Larry Klein; R.A. Clark
- Production locations: Hollywood, California
- Running time: 60 min.
- Production companies: Dick Clark Productions; Endemol; Buena Vista Television

Original release
- Network: Syndicated
- Release: September 25, 1999 – June 16, 2001

Your Big Break was a talent show featuring contestants playing the role of their song's original singer. The show aired in syndication from September 25, 1999 to June 16, 2001. It was originally hosted by Christopher "Kid" Reid from the late 80s/early 90s rap duo Kid 'n Play in its first season (1999-2000), then by Alfonso Ribeiro in its second (2000-2001). It was produced by Dick Clark Productions in association with Endemol and was distributed by Buena Vista Television.

== Gameplay ==
Celebrity sound- or look-alikes competed for cash and prizes. Each contestant was introduced by their real name and the singer they emulated. They each had roughly 3 minutes to impress the studio audience with their singing ability and/or likeness to the celebrity. The performances were accompanied by elaborate stage sets, dancers and full costuming. The winner of each show was determined by electronic voting courtesy of the audience members, with each winner returning at a later date to compete in the grand finals. Each season consisted of 22 episodes, six regular episodes followed by a semi-finals episode featuring the winners of the previous six episodes. The top two winners of the semi-final episode moved on to the finale at the end of the season. Another six episodes followed by a second semi-finals then a third batch of six with a third semi-finals episode before the finale at the end of the season. The winner of the finale was awarded a $20,000 cash prize along with a golden record trophy plaque.
