= House Party II (I Don't Know What You Come to Do) =

1991 single by Tony! Toni! Toné!

Single by Tony! Toni! Toné!

from the album House Party 2 (soundtrack)
- Released: 1991
- Genre: R&B
- Length: 5:17 (album version); 4:14 (single edit)
- Label: MCA
- Songwriters: Dwayne Wiggins; Raphael Wiggins; Milton Hollins

Tony! Toni! Toné! singles chronology
"Whatever You Want" (1991)	"House Party II (I Don't Know What You Come to Do)" (1991)	"Me and You" (1991)

"House Party II (I Don't Know What You Come to Do)" is a song performed by Tony! Toni! Toné!, issued as the title track from the soundtrack to the film House Party 2. The song was written by band members Raphael Saadiq and Dwayne Wiggins; and it peaked at number 19 on the Billboard R&B chart in 1991.

== Music video ==
The official music video for the song was directed by Lionel C. Martin.

== Charts ==
Chart performance for "House Party II (I Don't Know What You Come to Do)"
Chart (1991)	Peak position
Australia (ARIA)	141
US Hot Dance Music/Maxi-Singles Sales (Billboard)	40
US Hot R&B/Hip-Hop Singles & Tracks (Billboard)	19
