= Brothers uv da Blakmarket =

American hip hop group

Brothers Uv Da Blakmarket
- Also known as: Blakmarket, Brothers Of The Blackmarket
- Born: Christopher Mckinney, Eric Menal
- Origin: Paterson, New Jersey, U.S.
- Genres: Hip hop
- Years active: 1991–1993
- Label: Select Records
- Members: Cool Money Cee; DJ Menal

Brothers Uv Da Blakmarket is an American hip hop group that at the time of its formation in 1991 consisted of Cool Money Cee, and the DJ Menal. The group formed in Paterson, New Jersey (colloquially referred to as "The Rough Grounds" in the 1990s). Discovered by Pookie Gist, older brother of Kay Gee from the group Naughty By Nature. Signed to Select Records, group first appeared on the music scene in 1992 releasing a single called Livin In Da Bottle B/W Ruff Neck Style. Soon after the album Ruff Life was released. The Group performed as an opening act in the Flavor Unit Tour which featured House of Pain, Cypress Hill, Das EFX, Apache, Black Sheep, Queen Latifah, and Naughty by Nature. The Group was also a member of the original Source Magazine mobile van tour along with EPMD, Black Sheep, Raheem, K-Solo, Red Hot Lover Tone and the Brand New Heavies. After releasing their second single, Not U Again B/W I Mean It the group felt the Select Records did not do a good job promoting them or their music so they parted ways with the label. DJ Menal Produced three songs for LeShaun's scheduled for release album Ready or Not. He produced the lead Single Ready or Not and remixed the classic Wild Thang which was on the B-Side of the single. Cool Money Cee appeared on Apache's album. He performed on the song Woodchuck which also featured Treach, Vin Rock, Latee, and Double J. Blakmarket also appeared on the Flavor Unit's Roll Wit Da Flava compilation with LeShaun.

== Discography ==
=== Albums ===
- Ruff Life (1992)
