= Mystics of the God =

Studio album by King Just
- Released: 1995
- Studio: Chung King (New York City); Yo Mama's House (Los Angeles); Skanless (Alhambra, California); Unique (New York City); Battery (New York City)
- Genre: Hip hop
- Length: 59:41
- Label: Black Fist; Select
- Producer: Easy Mo Bee; E-Swift; Marcus Peake; MZA; RNS; Victor Flowers

King Just chronology
Mystics of the God (1995)	No Power on Earth (2001)

Singles from Mystics of the God
- 1. "Warrior's Drum" Released: 1994; 2. "No Flow on the Rodeo" Released: 1995

Professional ratings
Review scores
Source	Rating
AllMusic	2/5 stars
Entertainment Weekly	B−
RapReviews	5.5/10
The Source	3.5/5 stars

Mystics of the God is the debut studio album by American rapper King Just. It was released in 1995 via Blackfist/Select Records. Recording sessions took place at Chung King Studios, Unique Recording Studios and Battery Studios in New York, Yo Mama's House in Los Angeles and Skanless Studios in Alhambra, California. Production was handled by Marcus Peake, E-Swift, RNS, Easy Mo Bee, MZA and Victor Flowers. It features guest appearances from the Shaolin Soldiers and Mega Don.

The album debuted at number 33 on the Top R&B Albums and number 27 on the Heatseekers Albums charts in the United States. It was supported with two singles, "Warrior's Drum" and "No Flow on the Rodeo". Its lead single, "Warrior's Drum", made it to number 96 on the Billboard Hot 100 and number 85 on the Hot R&B/Hip-Hop Songs charts in the US.

== Track listing ==
Mystics of the God track listing
No.	Title	Producer(s)	Length
1.	"Mystic of the God"	Marcus Peake	3:24
2.	"Shaolin Soldiers"	E-Swift	4:44
3.	"Warrior's Drum" (Westside Remix)	RNS	4:50
4.	"Leave Now" (featuring Profes, Star and Mega Don)	Victor Flowers	4:26
5.	"No Flow on the Rodeo"	Easy Mo Bee	4:41
6.	"Round Em' Up"	Marcus Peake; Lionel (co.)	4:12
7.	"Can I Get Some"	Easy Mo Bee	5:28
8.	"Pain"	E-Swift	4:18
9.	"Move on Em' Stomp (Remix)" (featuring Shaolin Soldiers)	RNS	4:46
10.	"Escape from the Zoo"	MZA; Marcus Peake (co.); Lionel (co.)	4:15
11.	"Warrior's Drum"	RNS	5:00
12.	"Boom Bow!"	E-Swift	5:17
13.	"Hassan Chop"	Marcus Peake	4:20
Total length:			59:41

== Personnel ==
- Adrian "King Just" Angevin – vocals, sleeve notes
- "Profes" Taylor – vocals (tracks: 4, 9)
- Star – vocals (tracks: 4, 9)
- Mega Don – vocals (track 4)
- Orlando "Leatha Face" Irizarry – vocals (track 9)
- Baby Pa Bazil – vocals (track 9)
- Tommi Dordy – keyboards & additional programming (tracks: 3, 12)
- DJ Jam – keyboards & additional programming (track 3), re-mixing (tracks: 3, 12)
- Marcus Peake – producer (tracks: 1, 6, 13), co-producer (track 10), mixing (tracks: 1, 4, 6, 10, 13), re-mixing (track 9), executive producer, management
- Eric "E-Swift" Brooks – producer (tracks: 2, 8, 12), mixing (tracks: 2, 8)
- Arby "R.N.S." Quinn – producer (tracks: 3, 9, 11)
- Victor Flowers – producer (track 4)
- Osten "Easy Mo Bee" Harvey Jr. – producer (tracks: 5, 7)
- MZA – producer (track 10), re-mixing (track 9)
- Lionel – co-producer (tracks: 6, 10), mixing (track 13), re-mixing (track 9)
- John Wydrycs – engineering (tracks: 1, 4, 6, 9, 10)
- John Pace – engineering (tracks: 1, 9, 10)
- Steve "Fred 40 To Tha Head" Fredrickson – engineering & mixing (tracks: 2, 8)
- David "Wiz1" Crouch – engineering & mixing (tracks: 3, 12)
- Jack Hersca – engineering (tracks: 5, 7)
- Tim Latham – engineering & mixing (track 11)
- Chaz Harper – engineering assistant (track 11)
- Mark Grant – engineering (track 13)
- Keith Darling – executive producer
- Chris Santiago – associate executive producer, art direction, illustration concept, management
- Edward Lovelace – art direction
- Terrence Gaylor – cover illustration
- Michael Benabib – photography
- Erik Brumfield – additional photography
- Miguel Mojica – A&R

== Charts ==
Chart performance for Mystics of the God
Chart (1995)	Peak position
US Top R&B/Hip-Hop Albums (Billboard)	33
US Heatseekers Albums (Billboard)	27
