= John Semper =

American film director

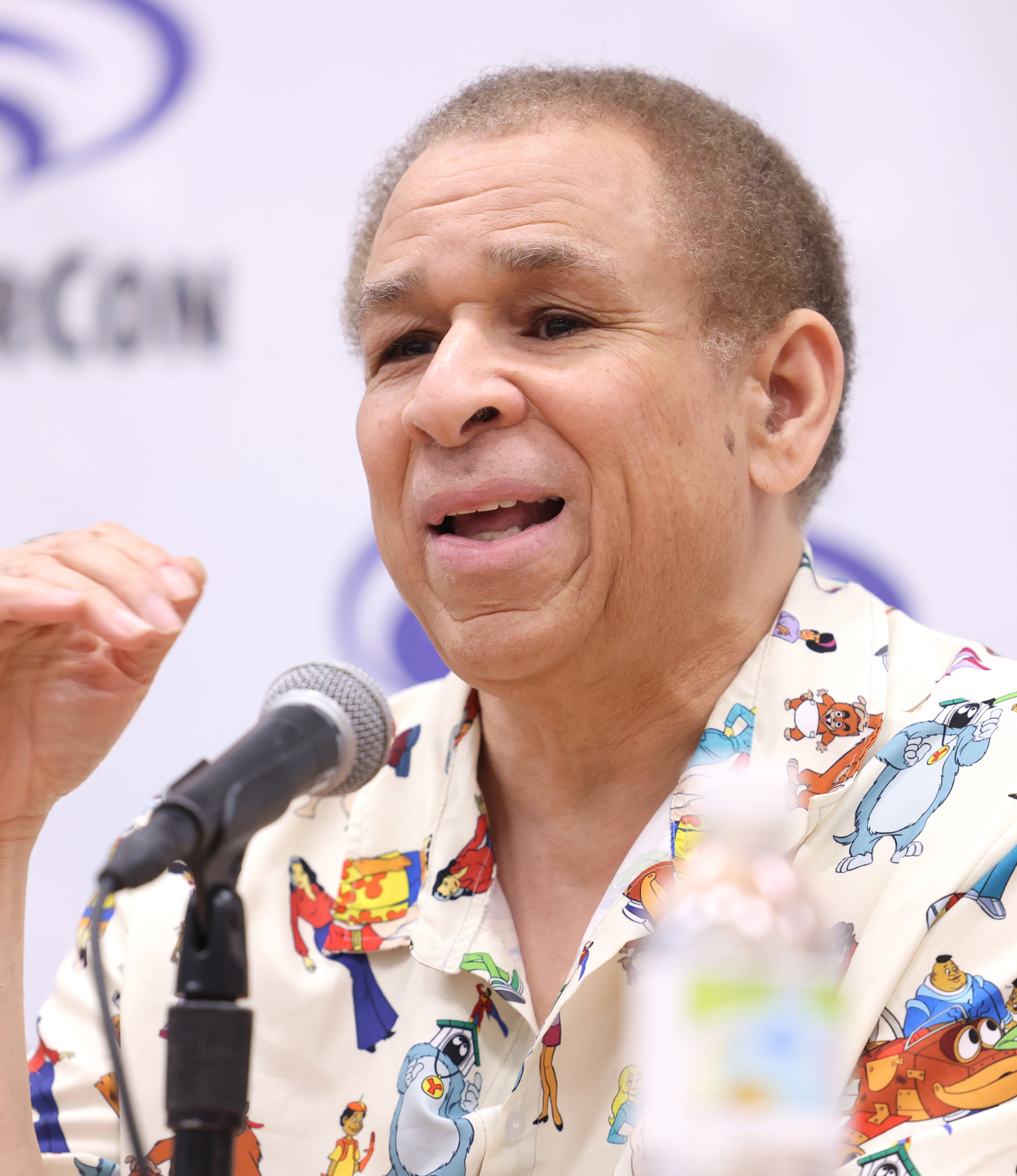
- Semper in 2025
- Born: John Semper Jr.
- Education: Harvard University (BA)
- Occupations: Screenwriter; showrunner; director; producer
- Years active: 1979–present
- Known for: Head writer of Spider-Man: The Animated Series

John Semper Jr. is an American screenwriter, producer and story editor with numerous credits in animation for television. He is best known for being both producer and head writer on the television series Spider-Man: The Animated Series.

Semper is the creative originator of the "Spider-Verse", also known as the "Spiderman Multiverse", a storyline propagated in various Spider-Man comics, television series, and films in the early 21st century.

== Education ==
John Semper Jr. graduated from Harvard University in 1975 with a bachelor's degree in Visual and Environmental Studies.

== Career ==
Semper has worked for miscellaneous companies as Walt Disney Studios, Warner Bros. Animation and Hanna-Barbera Productions during a career which has involved the development of projects for Jim Henson, George Lucas, Stan Lee, Rob Minkoff and others.

Semper created the English-language dialogue for two of Hayao Miyazaki's anime feature films Castle in the Sky and Kiki's Delivery Service, and co-wrote the screenplay for the live-action comedy Class Act.

During the 1990s, Semper was producer/story editor of Spider-Man: The Animated Series. which ran from 1994 to 1998.

In 2016, he began writing a Cyborg series for DC Comics drawn by Brian Stelfreeze.

=== Spider-Verse ===
Semper is the first Spider-man writer to involve the storyline of the "Spider-Verse", also known as the "Spiderman Multiverse". The penultimate and finale episodes of his animated Spiderman series, "Spider Wars, Chapter IV: I Really, Really Hate Clones" and "Spider Wars, Chapter V: Farewell, Spider-Man", respectively, involved multiple parallel universe Spider-Man characters convening. This marked the first Spider-Man story involving parallel universes. The work later appeared in various Spider-Man comics, cartoons and films such as the Spider-Verse movie franchise, and Spider-Man: No Way Home.

=== Creeporia ===
In 2014, Semper created the family comedy-horror webseries Creeporia (2014). The character of Creeporia was first introduced in the webseries titled Crypt of Creeporia, a live-action/animated blend of humor and horror. The title role in the original webseries was played by Kommerina DeYoung.

== Spider-Man website ==
As of November 2014, to commemorate the 20th anniversary of the Spider-Man: The Animated Series, Semper started cartoonspiderman.com, which includes behind-the-scenes content, a Facebook page, podcasts about the show, and more information about his work related to the 1994 animated series.

== Books ==
His books include The Singular Affair of the Missing Ball: A Sherlock Whippet Mystery (Lulu Press, 2005), as well as several books based on his scripts for the TLC/PBS Kids preschool series Jay Jay the Jet Plane, and Kids' WB action/adventure series Static Shock.

== Awards ==
"Day of the Chameleon", an episode Semper wrote for Spider-Man: The Animated Series, earned him a 1995 Annie Award nomination for Best Individual Achievement for Writing in the Field of Animation. In 1996, the series was nominated for an NAACP Image Award in the category Outstanding Animated/Live Action/Dramatic Youth or Children's Series/Special. In 2004, Semper was nominated for a Daytime Emmy for his work on Static Shock.

In 2023, Semper was a recipient of the Inkpot Award at the annual San Diego Comic Con.

== Screenwriting credits ==
- series head writer denoted in bold

=== Television ===
- Shirt Tales (1983)
- The Biskitts (1983)
- The New Scooby and Scrappy-Doo Show (1983–1984)
- Pink Panther and Sons (1984)
- Super Friends: The Legendary Super Powers Show (1984)
- The Smurfs (1984)
- Snorks (1984–1985)
- The Jetsons (1985)
- The 13 Ghosts of Scooby-Doo (1985)
- Kissyfur (1985)
- MoonDreamers (1986)
- Bionic Six (1987)
- DuckTales (1987)
- Fraggle Rock: The Animated Series (1987)
- The Jim Henson Hour (1989)
- **Kid 'n Play** (1990)
- **Spider-Man: The Animated Series** (1994–1998)
- The Puzzle Place (1995)
- Rugrats (1996–1998)
- Extreme Ghostbusters (1997)
- The Incredible Hulk (1997)
- Clifford the Big Red Dog (2000)
- Jay Jay the Jet Plane (2001)
- Kong: The Animated Series (2001)
- **Static Shock** (2003–2004): seasons 3–4 head writer
- Betsy's Kindergarten Adventures (2008)
- Pink Panther and Pals (2010)
- The Adventures of Chuck and Friends (2010–2011)
- Creeporia (2014)
- Justice League Action (2017)
- Weather Hunters (2025)

=== Films ===
- Class Act (1992)
- Green Lantern: Beware My Power (2022)
