= Kangol Kid =

American hip hop musician (1966–2021)

- Born: Shaun Shiller Fequiere; August 10, 1966; Brooklyn, New York, U.S.
- Died: December 18, 2021 (aged 55) Manhasset, New York, U.S.
- Genres: Hip hop
- Years active: 1983–2021
- Labels: Select Records; Jive Records

Shaun Shiller Fequiere (August 10, 1966 – December 18, 2021), known by his stage name Kangol Kid, was an American hip hop producer, songwriter, break dancer, and emcee. Kangol is best known as a member of the old school hip hop group UTFO.

Kangol Kid was the first hip-hop artist to endorse a product through his official sponsorship with Kangol headwear. His signature hat has been inducted into the Collection of the Smithsonian National Museum of African American History and Culture.

Kangol Kid is considered to be one of the "pioneers of hip-hop".

== Early years ==
Fequiere was born in Brooklyn, New York to Haitian parents. Fequiere shied away from his Haitian heritage growing up.

He acquired his nickname, The Kangol Kid, from neighborhood friends during the early 1980s, because of the many Kangol hats he owned and wore. He was also officially sponsored by Kangol Headwear, Inc.

He was signed to his first record label deal at age 17, without having had his own legal representation at the time.

== UTFO member ==
Kangol Kid was originally a breakdancer along with his dance partner, Doctor Ice. In 1984, UTFO became one of the most popular rap and breakdance acts in the country on the strength of their breakout single, "Roxanne, Roxanne".

During the mid-1980s, as "Roxanne, Roxanne" gained popularity and chart position, UTFO was voted best rap group, at the 1988 Urban Music Awards, had featured spots on Don Cornelius' Soul Train, The Phil Donahue Show, and performed live for actors such as Dustin Hoffman, and Tony Danza. UTFO was the first rap group to perform at Harlem's Apollo Theater as they opened for Hall & Oates and the Temptations' Eddie Kendricks and David Ruffin.

In 1987, UTFO released their highest-charting album, Lethal, featuring the rock group Anthrax on the title track.

== Production, management, and songwriting ==
In 1985, Fequiere wrote and composed "Private Property" on the Lisa Lisa & Cult Jam with Full Force album.

Later that year, he managed and produced the rap group, Whistle.

Fequiere worked as a producer, composer, performer, artist manager, and songwriter. He was the President of music production company, Kangol's Kreations, Inc., and CEO of his Public Relations firm, Kreative Media Group. Fequiere lectured at high schools and colleges nationwide on the business of music.

In 2012, Fequiere became the first rapper to be honored by the American Cancer Society.

== Personal life and death ==
Fequiere was an advocate and fundraiser for breast cancer research through the Mama Luke Foundation in collaboration with the American Cancer Society. He organized and participated in events throughout the country to raise money for research to fight breast cancer. Fequiere was also a father of 4, including 3 sons (T. Shaun, AJ, and Giovanni) and 1 daughter (Amancia).

On December 18, 2021, Fequiere died from colon cancer at the age of 55, at a hospital in Manhasset, New York.
