= Street Sounds Hip Hop Electro 14 =

Compilation album by various artists
- Released: 1986
- Genre: Electro music, old school hip hop
- Label: StreetSounds

Street Sounds Hip Hop Electro 14 is the fourteenth compilation album in a series and was released 1986 on the StreetSounds label. The album was released on LP and cassette and contains eight electro music and old school hip hop tracks mixed by Herbie Laidley.

== Track listing ==
Side one
No.	Title	Artist	Length
1.	"Monster Beat"	Awesome Foursome	-:--
2.	"Leave It To The Drums (Here Come The Drums) (Club)"	Tricky Tee	-:--
3.	"Breaking Bells (Club)"	T La Rock	-:--
4.	"The Manipulator (Extended Version)"	Mixmaster Gee and The Turntable Orchestra	-:--

Side two
No.	Title	Artist	Length
1.	"Me And My Posse"	Divine Sounds	-:--
2.	"She's A Skeezer"	Fresh Force	-:--
3.	"Downbeats"	M.C. Chill guest appearance by BeatMaster T	-:--
4.	"Rip The Cut"	Skinny Boys	-:--
