= Sylk Smoov =

American rapper

Floyd Harrison, better known as Sylk Smoov, is an American rapper from St. Louis, Missouri.

== Biography ==
Harrison was born in north St. Louis. In 1991, performing as Sylk Smoov, he signed a deal with Mercury Records, making him the first rapper from St. Louis to sign with a major record label. His debut album, also called Sylk Smoov, was released on PWL America in 1991. Two singles were released from the album: "Klientele" and "Trick Wit a Good Rap". These peaked at #27 and #14 on Billboard's Hot Rap Songs chart, respectively. He subsequently contributed the song "Drop Down" to the soundtrack of the 1994 movie House Party 3. Having traveled to Los Angeles to make his debut album, he subsequently returned to St. Louis to work in the construction industry prior to the release of his second album, Cat Action 25-8, in 2004. The same year, he also performed at SXSW in Austin, Texas, where he opened for Dizzee Rascal.

== Critical response ==
Sylk Smoov was reviewed favorably in the Source, which gave it a rating of 3 out of 5. The review stated that Smoov "...delivers hardcore lyrics in a smooth, mellow style that sounds like a cross between Too Short or MC Breed and Barry White."

== Discography ==
- Sylk Smoov (PWL America, 1991)
- Cat Action 25-8 (Cat Action Music, 2004)
