= Hi-top fade =

Hairstyle

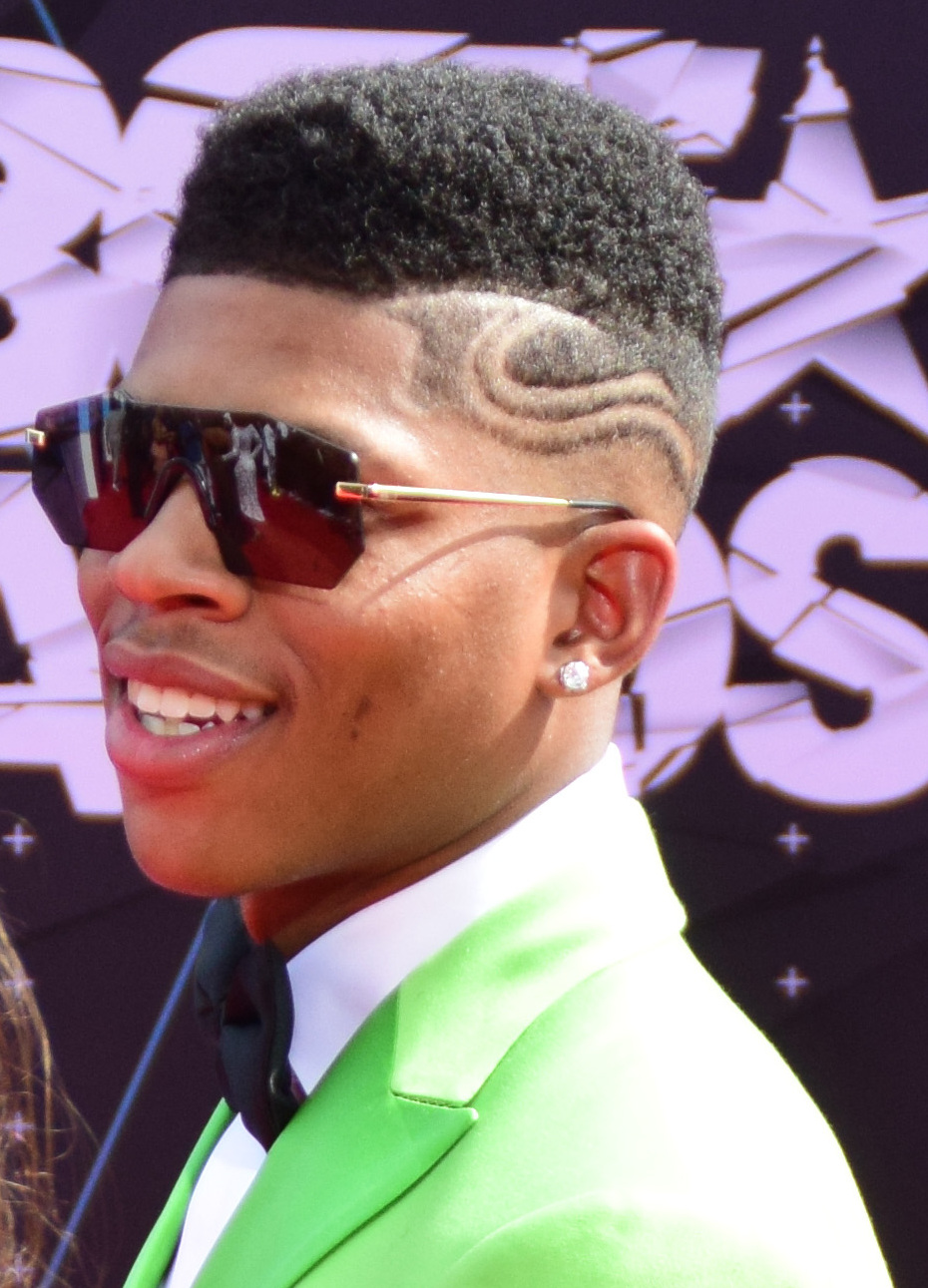
A medium length hi-top fade

Hi-top fade is a haircut where hair on the sides is cut off or kept very short while hair on the top of the head is grown long.

The hi-top was a trend during the golden age of hip hop and urban contemporary music of the 1980s and the early 1990s. It was common among young Black American males between 1984 and 1993 and to a lesser extent in the mid–1990s (1994–1996).

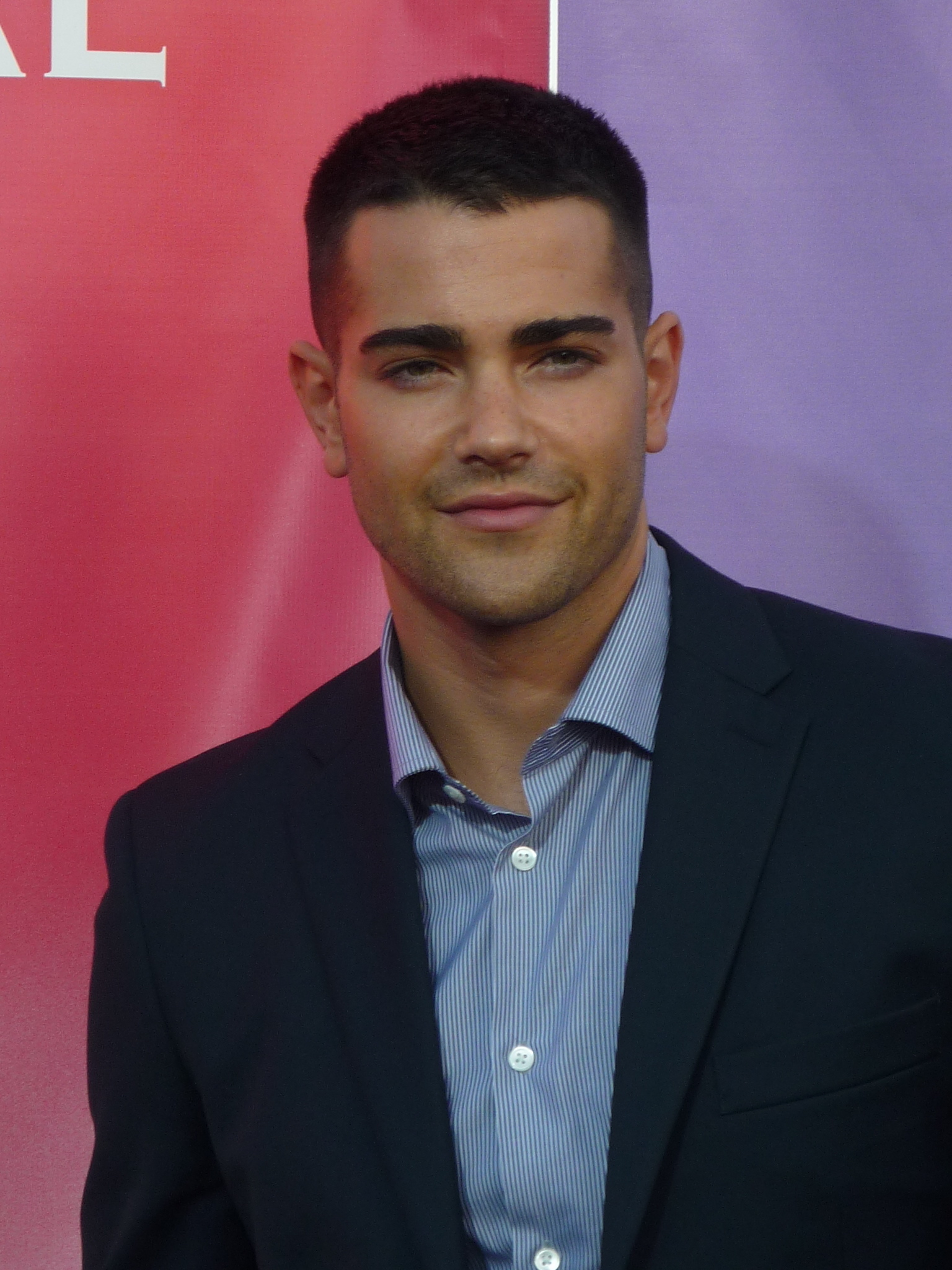
The crew cut shows graduation of the top hair shorter from the front hairline to the crown.

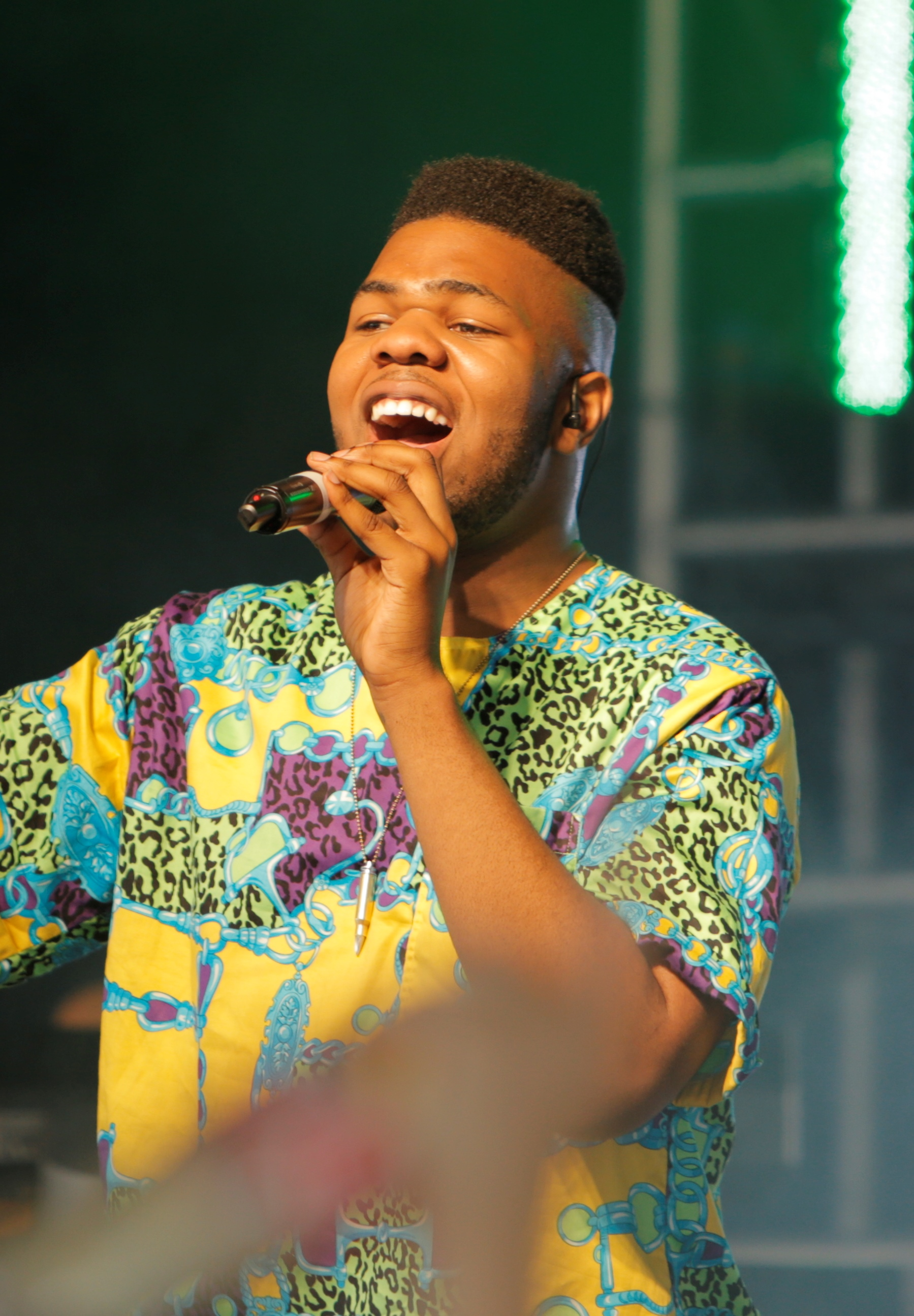
A MNEK length Singer hi-top fade

== Origin ==
In 1980, Grace Jones and then boyfriend Jean-Paul Goude collaborated on the cover and artwork for Warm Leatherette. It featured her signature flattop/hi-top hair.

In the hip hop community throughout the mid-1980s, young African Americans leaned towards Jheri curls or simple haircuts without tapers or fades of any sort. In 1985, rappers like Schoolly D and Doug E. Fresh had the first, somewhat developed, styles of the hi-top fade in hip hop. However, their hairstyles lacked the geometric precision that characterized the more modern hi-top fade styles.

In the hip-hop community, one of the first public appearances of the more modern hi-top fade hairstyles was in the "Tramp" video by Salt-N-Pepa, released early in 1987. In this video, the dancers could be seen with this hairstyle. They can be also seen dancing in a new jack swing style form based on their wardrobe and choreography, which was not seen in other hip hop and R&B videos at the time.

In the mid- to late 1980s, the haircut was often credited to Larry Blackmon and Rory Wake the lead singers of the band Cameo. Blackmon had a hairstyle in the mid 1980s that was the forerunner to the hi-top Fade, with the tall square flat top but with slightly longer sides and back. There are numerous examples of rappers referring to the hairstyle as a "cameo cut" between 1987 and 1990, the most notable being in the Ultramagnetic MCs song "Give The Drummer Some" from 1988 where Ced Gee, who had a hi-top fade at the time, says "... 'cause I'm a real pro, with a cameo, and not an afro".

== Growth in popularity ==
By 1986, many young African American people, especially in the New York City, Washington, D.C., and Philadelphia areas and also London areas, began to follow the hi-top fade trend. At this time, hi-top fades became more geometrically defined, becoming more massive and "higher" along with differences in shape as well as more designs. More music videos released from the fall of 1987 to the spring of 1988, such as "I Don't Care" by Audio Two (1988),"2 Hype" by Kid 'N Play (1988), "Move the Crowd" by Eric B. & Rakim (1987) (a few extras could be seen wearing one), "Paper Thin" by MC Lyte (1988), "Rising to the Top" by Doug E. Fresh (1988), "Do This My Way" by Kid 'N Play (1988), and "Ain't No Half Steppin'" by Big Daddy Kane (1988), show examples of early trends of the more developed hi-top fade. In the music video for EPMD's "You Gots To Chill", several dancers and the DJ can be seen sporting hi-top fades.

Different substyles emerged around the same time, such as the "gumby" (slanted hi-top that had a shape similar to the Gumby cartoon character) or reagan (similar to the gumby but with more "parts" and designs). Many of the teenage cast members on the films Lean On Me (1989) with Morgan Freeman and Spike Lee's Do The Right Thing (1989) could be seen wearing these Gumby-shaped hairstyles. Recording artists such as Bobby Brown, TKA and Coro also wore the hi-top fade.

From late 1988 to 1989, the hi-top fade was the symbol of rap culture at the time. Rappers such as Kid 'N Play, Big Daddy Kane and Kwamé were internationally famous for helping promote this trend worldwide, particularly Kid 'N Play member Christopher "Kid" Reid. In late 1988, hi-top fades became even more developed, with more hip-hoppers and people outside the New York area beginning following this trend. This hairstyle also helped define the new jack swing movement in the late 1980s and early 1990s. The video "Fight the Power" by Public Enemy, which was shot in April 1989, shows how much the trend set across the world and was highly symbolic of urban style at the time. Rapper and actor Will Smith sported a hi-top fade during the production of the popular sitcom The Fresh Prince of Bel-Air, even referencing the hairstyle in a first season episode of the show.

== Changing trends ==
The conventional hi-top began to fall out of fashion in the early 1990s and was changed by revolutionary R&B groups like Jodeci, who added slits and unique designs that are still imitated to this day. This style became the staple design set by the group who were the self-styled "bad boys of R&B". The turning point was between 1995 and 1997, when many people who had sported the hi-top fade started to move toward other men's styles.

Still, the hi-top remained common among many groups of young adults and teenagers for a few years longer. As for the braided style of hi-top fades, it characterized an era of "Afrocentricity" of hip hop and embracing the rap culture. Golden age MCs like Def Jef and the hip hop group De La Soul are known for their braided hi-top fade styles in 1989 and 1990. Many back-up dancers in many hip hop, dance, and R&B videos could be seen wearing similar hairstyles from 1990 to 1992. This trend continued until 1994 when urban hair style simplified into low-cut fade hair cuts and cornrow hairstyles. This hairstyle was also a fashion trend of new jack swing era.

== Modern hi-top fades ==
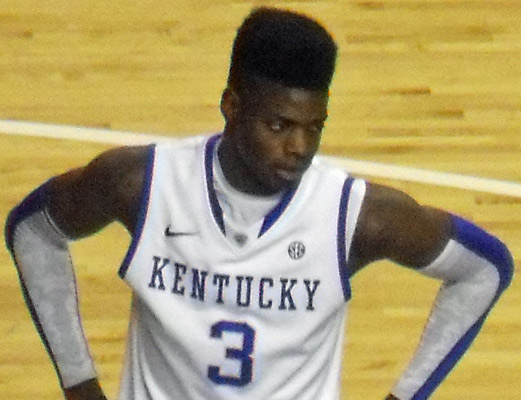
Nerlens Noel sporting a hi-top fade in 2012

The style began to slowly reemerge in popularity in the early to late 2000s, as a new generation of black musicians, athletes, and actors began to embrace this hairstyle. A prominent example is former Cleveland Cavaliers player Iman Shumpert. The hairstyle even surfaced again in 2012 with the late 1980s–early 1990s style returning. NBA players such as Nerlens Noel, Jaylen Brown and Norris Cole have sported hi-top fades. The YouTuber and online streamer Etika sported the hairstyle; he was inspired to grow one by Grand Theft Auto: San Andreas, which featured the hairstyle in the game.

The hi-top has made an appearance in the UK since the late 1980s. The hairstyle also received some airtime during the second inauguration of Barack Obama, as sported by Barack and Michelle Obama's nephew Avery Robinson.

== See also ==
- Afro-textured hair
- List of hairstyles
