= Face the Nation (Kid 'n Play album) =

Studio album by Kid 'n Play
- Released: September 24, 1991
- Recorded: 1991
- Studio: Bayside Studios; Marathon Studios; Power Play Studios (New York City)
- Genre: Pop rap
- Length: 49:44
- Label: Select; Elektra Entertainment
- Producer: Christopher Reid (exec.); Christopher Martin (also exec.); Alain Blake; Andre Chambers; Dana Mozie; Eric "Quicksilver" Johnson; Hurby Luv Bug; Mark Eastmond; Pete Rock

Kid 'n Play chronology
Funhouse (1990)	Face the Nation (1991)

Singles from Face the Nation
- 1. "Ain't Gonna Hurt Nobody" Released: 1991

Professional ratings
Review scores
Source	Rating
AllMusic	2/5 stars
The Encyclopedia of Popular Music	3/5 stars
Entertainment Weekly	B
The Rolling Stone Album Guide	2/5 stars

Face the Nation is the third studio album by the American hip hop duo Kid 'n Play. It was released in 1991 via Select Records.

The album peaked at number 144 on the Billboard 200 and number 27 on the Top R&B/Hip-Hop Albums. Its lead single, "Ain't Gonna Hurt Nobody", made it to number 51 on the Billboard Hot 100 and topped the Hot Rap Songs. It achieved platinum-selling status as a single.

== Production ==
The production was handled by Eric "Quicksilver" Johnson, Dana Mozie, Pete Rock, Alain Blake, Andre Chambers, Hurby Luv Bug, Mark Eastmond, and Christopher Martin, who also served as executive producer together with Christopher Reid.

== Critical reception ==
The Rolling Stone Album Guide wrote that "Kid 'N Play make the mistake of many rap has-beens, lecturing other rap acts without realizing how laughable their own sound has become." Billboard called the album "a grooving record that is enjoyable but lacks some of the charm of earlier efforts." The Washington Post acknowledged the album's more serious tracks, but wrote that the duo "refuse to conform and end up doing what they do best—be themselves ... That means throwing down upbeat, fun party songs such as 'Foreplay' and their latest hit 'Ain't Gonna Hurt Nobody'."

== Track listing ==
Face the Nation track listing
No.	Title	Writer(s)	Producer(s)	Length
1.	"It's Alright Y'all"	Christopher Reid; Eric Johnson	Eric "Quicksilver" Johnson	4:32
2.	"Back on Wax"	Reid; Andre Chambers; Mark Eastmond	Mark Eastmond; Andre Chambers	4:40
3.	"Got a Good Thing Going On"	Reid; Christopher Martin; Dana Mozie Jr.	Dana Mozie	4:40
4.	"Next Question"	Reid; Martin; Peter Phillips	Pete Rock	5:08
5.	"Face the Nation"	Reid; Johnson; D. Durant	Eric "Quicksilver" Johnson	4:44
6.	"Foreplay"	Martin; Alain Blake	Alain Blake; Christopher Martin	4:31
7.	"Slippin'"	Mozie	Dana Mozie	4:13
8.	"Ain't Gonna Hurt Nobody"	Reid; Johnson; Regi Hargis Hickman	Eric "Quicksilver" Johnson	4:45
9.	"Give It Here"	Martin; Eastmond	Christopher Martin	4:35
10.	"Bill's at the Door"	Phillips; Durant	Pete Rock	4:51
11.	"Toe to Toe" (Fat R&B Mix)	Hurby Azor	Fingerprints; Dana Mozie (co.)	5:54
Total length:				49:44

== Charts ==
Face the Nation chart performance
Chart (1991)	Peak position
US Billboard 200	144
US Top R&B/Hip-Hop Albums (Billboard)	27
