= Welcome to Durham, USA =

Welcome to Durham The Documentary
- Directed by: Christopher Martin
- Produced by: Kyser "Mike Nice" Wilson; Courtney Conrad; Courtney Tucker
- Edited by: Christopher Martin
- Music by: "World Famous Butta Team"
- Distributed by: RDU919 Music & Films; Defend Films; Ryko Distribution
- Release date: January 23, 2007
- Running time: 160 minutes
- Language: English

Welcome to Durham, USA is a documentary about gang violence in Durham, North Carolina.

== Synopsis ==
Welcome to Durham, USA shows how gangs are not only a problem in big cities, but also in smaller cities and towns. It shows how the rivalry between the Crips and the Bloods are spreading out far beyond big cities.

== Post release ==
Welcome to Durham, USA won the Best Documentary Award at the New York International Film Festival. The soundtrack for the film includes the single "Welcome 2 Durham" by World Famous Butta Team featuring Big Daddy Kane and Little Brother produced by Grammy Award Winner 9th Wonder.
