= House Party 3 (soundtrack) =

House Party 3: Original Motion Picture Soundtrack

Soundtrack album by Various artists
- Released: January 11, 1994
- Recorded: 1993
- Genres: Hip hop, R&B
- Length: 60:30
- Label: Select
- Producers: The Beatnuts, Trackmasters, Chris Stokes, AMG, Darryl Dee, Soul G., DR Period

Professional ratings
Review scores
Source	Rating
Allmusic	3/5 stars

House Party 3: Original Motion Picture Soundtrack is the soundtrack to the 1994 film House Party 3. It was released on January 11, 1994, through Select Records and consisted of a blend of hip hop and R&B. The soundtrack was the least successful of the three, making it to number 55 on the Top R&B/Hip-Hop Albums, nor was the soundtrack's only charting single "Butt Booty Naked" by AMG. Six songs on the album were performed by the film's stars, Kid 'n Play; to date it has been the last original material the group has released.

== Track listing ==
1. "Bounce" – 4:17 (Kid 'n Play)
2. "Wakes You Up" – 3:26 (Immature)
3. "Two Fingers" – 5:12 (Kid 'n Play)
4. "How About Some Hardcore" – 4:32 (M.O.P.)
5. "Drop Down" – 3:48 (Sylk Smoov)
6. "Rock the House" – 3:50 (R.A.S. Posse)
7. "The Illest" – 3:31 (Red Hot Lover Tone)
8. "Butt Booty Naked" – 3:59 (AMG)
9. "Make Noize" – 3:44 (Kid 'n Play)
10. "How'm I Doin'?" – 4:14 (Kid 'n Play)
11. "Void" – 4:02 (Kid 'n Play)
12. "We Got It Goin' On" – 3:45 (To da Core)
13. "Here and Now" – 4:17 (Kid 'n Play)
14. "I Just Love the Man" – 4:21 (Everyday Emotions)
15. "The Cure" – 3:32 (Nerissa)
