= Class Act =

1992 film by Randall Miller

- Theatrical release poster
- Directed by: Randall Miller
- Screenplay by: Cynthia Friedlob; John Semper
- Story by: Michael Swerdlick; Richard Brenne; Wayne Allan Rice
- Produced by: Jean Higgins; Joe Wizan; Maynell Thomas; Suzanne de Passe; Todd Black
- Starring: Kid 'n Play
- Cinematography: Francis Kenny
- Edited by: John F. Burnett; Richard Leeman
- Music by: Vassal Benford
- Production companies: Wizan/Black Films de Passe Entertainment
- Distributed by: Warner Bros.
- Release date: June 5, 1992
- Running time: 98 minutes
- Country: United States
- Language: English
- Budget: $7.5 million (estimated)
- Box office: $13.2 million

Class Act is a 1992 American comedy film directed by Randall Miller and starring hip-hop duo Kid 'n Play. An urban retelling of Mark Twain's The Prince and the Pauper, the film was written by Cynthia Friedlob and John Semper from a story by Michael Swerdlick, Richard Brenne and Wayne Allan Rice. Filmed at Van Nuys High School in the San Fernando Valley section of Los Angeles, it is the third of five films starring Kid 'n Play, following House Party (1990) and House Party 2 (1991), and preceding House Party 3 (1994) and House Party: Tonight's the Night (2013).

== Plot ==
Genius high school student Duncan Pinderhughes is getting ready for graduation, but is somewhat disheartened to find out that, despite his perfect SAT score and 4.0 GPA, prestigious Hafford University (parody of Harvard University) will not admit him unless he can pass phys. ed. Ex-convict Michael "Blade" Brown is released from jail, and told by his parole officer that the condition of his release is satisfactory graduation from high school. A mishap results in their pictures being swapped on their permanent school records. In effect, Blade is surprised to find out that he is being placed in gifted classes, while Duncan is shocked to be placed in minimal classes with substandard conditions and miscreants for classmates.

Blade realizes this and sees Duncan as his ticket permanently out of jail, since Duncan could pass his classes with ease. He transforms Duncan into a version of himself with dreadlocks, and does his best to teach Duncan how to act and talk like himself. Having no grasp of hip hop culture, Duncan's parents begin to worry about their son's new "friend"; his father especially, beginning to suspect Duncan is gay.

Blade manages to smooth-talk his way through his advanced classes, even successfully executing a dissertation on sexual intercourse (one of his favorite subjects). Duncan ends up running into trouble with a high school thug named Wedge, but also discovers an uncanny ability to kick field goals, and joins the school's football team. Both Blade and Duncan end up with girlfriends that the other would have, with Blade smooth-talking the intelligent but excitement-seeking Ellen and Duncan being pursued by the wild Damita (Alysia Rogers).

A drug dealer named Mink was told by his employee Wedge that Blade has been stepping into his territory and a chase involving the guys and their girlfriends and one of Duncan's new buddies ensues. The gang briefly lose Wedge and Mink and go to Damita's workplace (a wax museum), but are discovered by Mink and Wedge. Once there, the girlfriends realize that their men are swapped, and both guys eventually end up dumped. Still, Duncan manages to knock out Wedge in the museum, while Blade handles Mink, but they all end up in jail.

After the mix-up is corrected, Blade, Duncan and company are all set free. In an anti-climax, Duncan and Blade both enter a Knowledge bowl in an effort to get Blade back with Ellen. They succeed when Blade answers a tiebreaker question to win the competition, recalling a choice tidbit Ellen once told him. Afterward, both couples end up together. In a final scene, Duncan's father walks in on him and Damita having sex, which relieves his initial worries about Duncan's sexuality.

Walking in each other's shoes dramatically changed the lives of both Duncan and Blade. In the epilogue, the audience learns that Blade graduated from high school and attended Hafford (even wearing preppy attire), while Duncan attended Stanford on a football scholarship.

== Cast ==
- Christopher "Kid" Reid – Duncan Pinderhughes
- Christopher "Play" Martin – Michael Charles "Blade" Brown
- Karyn Parsons – Ellen
- Thomas Mikal Ford – Mink
- Rick Ducommun – Parole Officer Reichert
- Alysia Rogers – Damita
- Andre Rosey Brown – Jail Guard
- David Basulto – Go-Go
- Doug E. Doug – Popsicle
- George Alvarez – Tommy
- Lamont Johnson – Wedge
- Loretta Devine – Ms. Brown
- Mariann Aalda – Mrs. Pinderhughes
- Meshach Taylor – Mr. Pinderhughes
- Michael Whaley – Tyrone
- Patricia Fraser – Mrs. Ipswitch
- Pauly Shore – Julian Thomas (uncredited)
- Raye Birk – Principal Kratz
- Reginald Ballard – Fruity
- Simply Marvalous – Ms. Jackson
- John Hostetter – Football Coach

Cameo appearances by:

- Lance Crouther – Bad Dude #1
- Rhea Perlman – Joanne Simpson
- Sam McMurray – Skip Wankman
- Baldwin C. Sykes – Bad Dude #2

== Reception ==
=== Box office ===
The film debuted at No.7 at the US box office. It went on to earn a total of $13,272,113.

=== Critical response ===
The film received negative reviews, but after release on VHS and DVD, it became a cult favorite.

On the review aggregator website Rotten Tomatoes, 17% of 12 critics' reviews are positive, with an average rating of 3.8/10. Metacritic, which uses a weighted average, assigned the film a score of 49 out of 100, based on 18 critics, indicating "mixed or average" reviews. Gene Siskel and Roger Ebert both found it silly, but the former gave the film a "Thumbs Up" and the latter a "Thumbs Down" and thought little of the film's portrayal of women and class level.

Janet Maslin of The New York Times said that "the movie doesn't aspire to much more than cartoonish verve, but Kid 'n' Play easily hold it together. Their comic timing is right, and their humor manages to be both traditional and current. (An argument about whether one of them is "deaf" or "def" unfolds in the best "Who's on first?" fashion.) The film easily incorporates a crowd-pleasing rap and dance episode featuring both of them, and it meanders only when taking on anything more complicated. A chase sequence through a wax museum only confuses matters by becoming too crowded, and temporarily losing track of the stars."

Rolling Stone critic Peter Travers said that "first-time director Randall Miller guides [the actors] over every predictable comic misstep with a timeout for a hip-hop number. Kid'n Play have charm, but it's disturbing to see them settle for the slick. Their rap used to stand for something; now it's just easy listening."

== Home media ==
The film was made available on DVD in May 2010.

== Soundtrack ==
1. B Angie B – A Class Act I (5:42)
2. Monie Love – Full Term Love (4:45)
3. Jade – I Wanna Love You (4:33)
4. Tara Kemp – Anything You Ask (5:03)
5. Vassal Benford – Blade's Theme (4:28)
6. Penthouse Players – A Class Act II (Rap Version) (3:24)
7. Kid 'N Play – Get It Right (4:07)
8. Lord Finesse – Set It Off Troop (4:16)
9. Cold Premiere – That Body (4:50)
10. Lisa Taylor – Better Late Than Never (4:01)

== See also ==
- List of hood films
