= 2 Hype =

Studio album by Kid 'n Play
- Released: October 26, 1988
- Recorded: 1987–88
- Studio: Bayside Sound Recording Studio (New York, NY)
- Genre: Hip hop
- Length: 43:37
- Label: Select
- Producer: Hurby Luv Bug; The Invincibles

Kid 'n Play chronology
| 2 Hype (1988) | Funhouse (1990) |

Singles from 2 Hype
- 1. "Last Night" Released: 1987; 2. "Do This My Way" Released: 1988; 3. "Gittin' Funky" Released: 1988; 4. "Rollin' With Kid 'N Play" Released: 1989; 5. "2 Hype" Released: 1989

2 Hype is the debut studio album by American rap duo Kid 'n Play. It was released on October 26, 1988, through Select Records. The recording sessions took place at Bayside Sound Recording Studio in New York. The album was produced by Hurby "Luv Bug" Azor and the Invincibles. It features the lone guest appearance from The Real Roxanne.

The album reached number 96 on the Billboard 200, number nine on the Top R&B/Hip-Hop Albums and was certified Gold by the Recording Industry Association of America. Three singles found success on the Billboard Hot R&B/Hip-Hop Songs and Hot Rap Songs charts: "Rollin' with Kid 'n Play" (No. 11 and No. 2, respectively), "2 Hype" (No. 46 and No. 19, respectively) and "Gittin' Funky" (No. 53 and No. 24, respectively).

== Critical reception ==
Professional ratings
Review scores
| Source | Rating |
|---|---|
| AllMusic | 4.5/5 stars |
| The Rolling Stone Album Guide | 3.5/5 stars |

The Rolling Stone Album Guide called the album "witty and entertaining," writing that "its amiable energy never disappoints."

In 2008, "Rollin' with Kid 'n Play" was ranked No. 63 on VH1's "100 Greatest Songs of Hip Hop".

== Track listing ==
2 Hype track listing
| No. | Title | Writer(s) | Length |
|---|---|---|---|
| 1. | "Rollin' With Kid 'N Play" | Christopher Reid; Eric Johnson; Bernard Doss | 4:01 |
| 2. | "Brother Man Get Hip" | Reid; Johnson; Andre Chambers | 3:43 |
| 3. | "Gittin' Funky" | Reid; Christopher Martin; Hurby Azor; Johnson | 4:41 |
| 4. | "Soul Man" | Reid; Martin; Azor | 3:31 |
| 5. | "Damn That DJ (The Wizard M.E.)" | Reid; Chambers; Mark Eastmond | 3:28 |
| 6. | "Last Night" | Reid; Martin; Azor | 4:23 |
| 7. | "2 Hype" | Reid; Azor | 3:57 |
| 8. | "Can You Dig That" | Reid; Johnson; Chambers | 3:27 |
| 9. | "Undercover" (featuring The Real Roxanne) | Reid; Martin; Azor | 3:38 |
| 10. | "Do the Kid 'N Play Kick Step" | Reid; Azor | 4:02 |
| 11. | "Do This My Way" | Reid; Azor | 4:46 |
| Total length: | | | 43:37 |

| No. | Title | Writer(s) | Remixer(s) | Length |
|---|---|---|---|---|
| 12. | "Gittin' Funky" (U.K. 12" Remix) | Reid; Martin; Azor; Johnson | Dancin' Danny D | 6:30 |
| 13. | "Do This My Way" (Double Trouble 12" Remix) | Reid; Azor; Lou Reed | Dancin' Danny D; Fatboy Slim | 5:40 |

== Charts ==
2 Hype chart performance
| Chart (1988) | Peak position |
|---|---|
| US Billboard 200 | 96 |
| US Top R&B/Hip-Hop Albums (Billboard) | 9 |

== Certifications ==
2 Hype certifications
| Region | Certification | Certified units/sales |
|---|---|---|
| United States (RIAA) | Gold | 500,000^{^} |
^{^} Shipments figures based on certification alone.
