= Kid 'n Play =

American hip hop duo

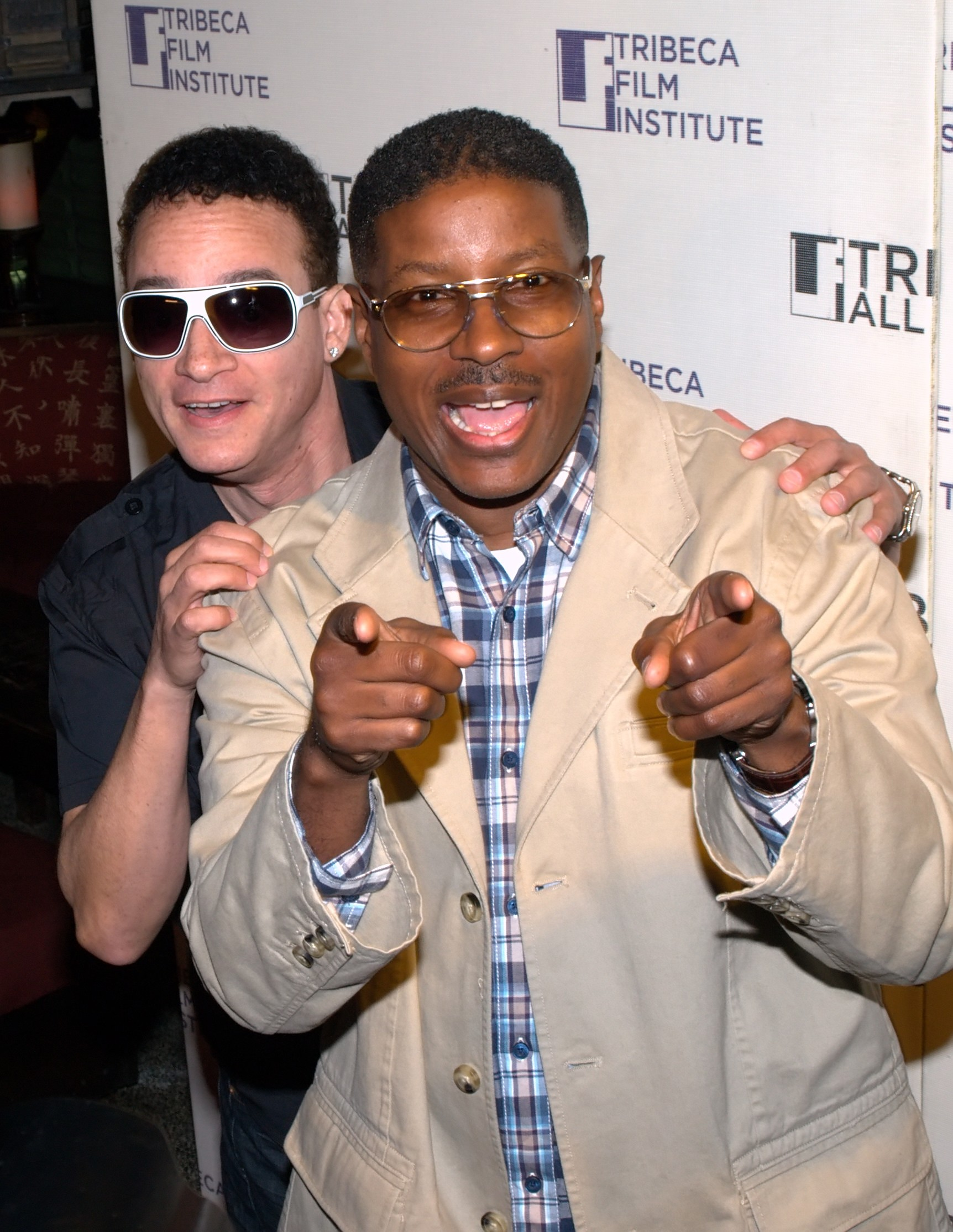
- Kid 'n Play at the 2010 Tribeca Film Festival

Background information
- Also known as: Celebrity Club; The Fresh Force Crew
- Origin: New York City, U.S.
- Genres: Hip hop, new jack swing
- Years active: 1987–1995; 2001–2008; 2009–present
- Labels: Slice; Sutra; Select
- Members: Kid; Play
- Website: kidnplayofficial.com

Kid 'n Play are an American hip-hop duo from New York City who were popular in the late 1980s and early 1990s. The duo is composed of Christopher Reid ("Kid") and Christopher Martin ("Play") working alongside their DJ, Mark "DJ Wiz" Eastmond. Besides their musical careers, they also branched out into acting.

== History ==
=== Music career ===
Christopher Reid and Christopher Martin met while performing in rival high school groups the Turnout Brothers and the Super Lovers and initially formed their duo under the name the Fresh Force Crew. In 1986, "She's a Skeezer" and "Rock Me" were recorded. By 1987, they had changed their name to Kid 'n Play.

Kid 'n Play in 1991

Kid 'n Play recorded three albums together between 1988 and 1991: 2 Hype (1988), Kid 'n Play's Funhouse (1990) and Face the Nation (1991). Hurby "Luv Bug" Azor, the producer for Salt-N-Pepa (who had been a member of the Super Lovers with Play) served as Kid 'n Play's manager and producer during the early portion of their career. All three albums focused upon positive lyrics backed by pop-friendly instrumental tracks. Among the group's most successful singles were 1989's "Rollin' with Kid 'n Play" (No. 11 on the Billboard R&B singles chart), 1990s "Funhouse" (No. 1 on the Billboard rap singles chart), and "Ain't Gonna Hurt Nobody" (another No. 1 rap hit). The group's stage show highlighted their teen-friendly personalities, and dances such as their trademark, the Kick Step. Kid's visual trademark was his hi-top fade haircut, which stood ten inches high at its peak. Martin regularly wore eight-ball jackets.

Kid 'n Play were also notable for their dance known as the Kid n' Play Kickstep, first seen in their video "Do This My Way," and described in the song "Do the Kid n' Play Kickstep," from their first album, 2 Hype. Also affectionately known as the "Funky Charleston," it was influenced by the 1920s era dance The Charleston. The Kid n' Play Kickstep featured the new jack swing-aerobic dance moves typical of late 1980s urban street dancing. Unlike the original Charleston, the Kid n' Play Kickstep requires two participants instead of one. This dance also was made quite popular in Kid 'n Play's feature film House Party, in which their characters Kid Robinson and Play Martin have a dance competition with Sydney (Tisha Campbell) and Sharane (Adrienne-Joi Johnson).

=== Acting careers ===
In addition to their music, Kid 'N Play have starred together in six feature films, all based on hip hop culture-inspired characters and themes; the duo also appeared on the soundtrack albums to these films. Five of the Kid 'n Play films are entries in the House Party series. The first two House Party films (1990's House Party and 1991's House Party 2) also featured the then-relatively unknown Martin Lawrence and Tisha Campbell, later stars of the former's hit TV sitcom, Martin. In the early 1990s, House Party 3 (1994) featured hip-hop/R&B girl group TLC as the music group Sex as a Weapon. Kid 'n Play were absent from the later fourth film in the series, House Party 4: Down to the Last Minute (2001), which has no connection to any of the prior films. Likewise, they appeared in a subsequent unrelated film, House Party: Tonight's the Night (2013), in which the duo made a cameo appearance to show just how successful their characters have become since the events of House Party 3. Since the events of the third film, the two have gone on to become music superstars and CEOs of their own record label, Kick Power Records, a venture they began in House Party 3. They later made a silent cameo in the sixth installment, simply titled House Party (2023), which serves as a legacy sequel and reboot of the series. Unlike the older films, the 2023 film portrays their fictional personas as members of a cult, strongly implying that they "sold" their souls for wealth and fame. The first film was originally meant for DJ Jazzy Jeff & the Fresh Prince. Years later, in an interview with Halftimeonline.net, DJ Jazzy Jeff revealed:

When we did "Nightmare On My Street" New Line Cinema sued the daylights out of us, but they liked the record and they thought Will and I were talented from "Parents Just Don't Understand." So part of the settlement was that we had to pay them some money, but they offered us two scripts to do two movies. The first script was House Party, because if you think about the premise of House Party, one dude was a Dj and the other was a rapper, so House Party was set up for Jazzy Jeff and the Fresh Prince. We weren't thinking about doing movies back then. Then Kid N Play blew up off of that.

Class Act, produced in 1992, was a comedy in the same vein as the House Party films. For that film, Reid traded his trademark hi-top fade for braids instead. The haircut is used as a plot device in the film.

Kid 'n Play even had their own NBC Saturday morning cartoon, Kid 'n Play, for one season (1990). On the show, Kid 'n Play's characters were regressed to teenagers but their recording careers remained intact, as did their comic personas. The real Kid 'n Play appeared in live-action/animated wraparounds of the cartoons but voice actors (again including close friend, Martin Lawrence) performed in the animated portions of the show. The show stressed positive role models, teaching kids how to get along and stay out of trouble. A 1992 Marvel Comics comic book based on the cartoon was printed for nine issues; the duo also shot some motivational segments for PBS, for the mathematics show Square One TV and Sesame Street, respectively. Kid 'n Play were featured in the Adult Swim animated special Freaknik: The Musical as themselves.

=== After the duo ===
Reid continued acting, guest starring in a number of television sitcoms, including Full House, Sister, Sister and Smart Guy and hosting shows such as It's Showtime at the Apollo and Your Big Break. Martin became a born-again Christian, and devoted his time to working on Christian-based hip-hop music projects. He eventually took his industry experience and founded HP4Digital Works, a multimedia company that provides pre- and post-production for film, digital, and live theater productions. He also founded Brand Newz, an online news magazine focusing on positive community leaders and events. Martin joined the faculty at North Carolina Central University in Durham, North Carolina as an Artist in Resident where he teaches a credited course titled Hip Hop in Context 101. Martin was also a judge for the 8th annual Independent Music Awards.

In 2009, State Farm released a commercial featuring LeBron James dancing to the music of Kid 'n Play. In October 2009, the duo appeared on the 2009 BET Hip Hop Awards where they did their trademark dance. On February 9, 2010, the duo appeared on The Mo'Nique Show.

Reid made a cameo appearance at the end of the LMFAO video for "Sorry for Party Rocking", which recalled Kid n Play's House Party movies.

On July 15, 2015, Kid 'n Play were interviewed for an episode of TV One's Unsung. In 2020, Martin appeared in six episodes of the sitcom Church Folks. In November 2023, they appeared in a Progressive insurance ad, entitled 'Watch Party'.

=== Later musical appearances ===
In 2009, the duo went on tour for the House Party anniversary along with other rappers such as Salt-N-Pepa. On June 23, 2010, the duo appeared on Lopez Tonight and performed "Rollin' with Kid 'n Play" from their album 2 Hype.

On February 27, 2012, Kid 'n Play released an "open letter," detailing planned future events. On July 30, 2012, Kid 'n Play joined Salt-N-Pepa onstage at a concert in Brooklyn, New York. On July 23, 2013, the duo made a cameo appearance in the fifth House Party installment, House Party: Tonight's the Night.

On February 2, 2014, the duo made a cameo appearance in the RadioShack Super Bowl XLVIII commercial, "The '80s Called". On August 3, 2021, Kid 'n Play were announced to be on the Insane Clown Posse's 2021 Gathering of the Juggalos festival.

== Discography ==
=== Studio albums ===
List of studio albums, with selected chart positions and certifications
Title	Album details	Peak chart positions		Certifications
Title	Album details	US	US R&B /HH	Certifications
2 Hype	Released: October 21, 1988; Label: Select; Formats: CD, LP, Cassette, digital download	96	9	RIAA: Gold
Funhouse	Released: March 13, 1990; Label: Select; Formats: CD, LP, Cassette, digital download	58	11	RIAA: Gold
Face the Nation	Released: September 24, 1991; Label: Select/Elektra; Formats: CD, LP, Cassette, digital download	144	27	

=== Compilation albums ===
List of compilation albums
Title	Album details
Best Of (re-recordings compilation album)	Released: June 11, 2025; Label: Cleopatra; Format: digital download, streaming

=== Unreleased albums ===
- The Best of Kid N Play: A Sound Investment (2003)

=== Singles ===
==== As lead artist ====
List of singles and selected chart positions, showing year released and album name
Title	Year	Peak chart positions						Album
Title	Year	US	US Dance	US R&B	US Rap	NZ	UK	Album
"Girls (Rulin' The World)" (featuring Royal Silk) (Note: "Girls (Rulin' The World)" was released under the name Celebrity Club.)	1986	—	—	—	*	—	—	Street Sounds Hip Hop Electro 12
"Rock Me" (Note: "Rock Me" was released under the name The Fresh Force Crew.)	1986	—	—	—	*	—	—	Non-album single
"She's a Skeezer/All Hail the Drum" (Note: "She's a Skeezer/All Hail the Drum" was released under the name Fresh Force.)	1986	—	—	—	*	—	—	Street Sounds Hip Hop Electro 14
"Last Night"	1987	—	—	—	*	—	71	2 Hype
"Do This My Way"	1988	—	—	—	*	—	48	2 Hype
"Gittin' Funky"	1988	—	—	53	24	—	55	2 Hype
"Rollin' with Kid 'n Play"	1989	—	49	11	2	—	—	2 Hype
"2 Hype"	1989	—	—	46	19	—	88	2 Hype
"Funhouse (The House We Dance In)"	1990	—	— (Note: "Funhouse (The House We Dance In)" did not enter the Dance Club Songs, but peaked at number 42 on the Dance/Electronic Singles Sales.)	27	1	—	—	House Party Soundtrack and Funhouse
"Back to Basix"	1990	—	—	69	16	—	—	Funhouse
"Ain't Gonna Hurt Nobody"	1991	51	— (Note: "Ain't Gonna Hurt Nobody" did not enter the Dance Club Songs, but peaked at number 18 on the Dance/Electronic Singles Sales.)	26	1	7	—	House Party 2 Soundtrack and Face the Nation
"Slippin'/Friendz"	1991	—	—	—	—	—	—	Face the Nation
"Bounce"	1994	—	—	—	—	—	—	House Party 3 Soundtrack
"—" denotes a recording that did not chart or was not released in that territory.

==== Promotional singles ====
List of singles, showing year released and album name
Title	Year	Album
"Toe to Toe"	1990	Funhouse

=== Guest appearances ===
List of non-single guest appearances, with other performing artists, showing year released and album name
Title	Year	Other performer(s)	Album
"Fun House"	1990	—N/a	House Party Soundtrack
"Kid vs. Play (The Battle)"	1990	—N/a	House Party Soundtrack and Funhouse
"I Don't Know"	1990	Salt-N-Pepa	Blacks' Magic
"Foreplay"	1991	—N/a	Talkin' Dirty After Dark Soundtrack and Face the Nation
"Announcement of Pajama Jammi Jam"	1991	—N/a	House Party 2 Soundtrack
"The Christopher Robinson Scholarship Fund"	1991	—N/a	House Party 2 Soundtrack
"You Gotta Pay What You Owe"	1991	—N/a	House Party 2 Soundtrack
"Get It Right"	1992	—N/a	Class Act Soundtrack
"Simple Simon"	1993	—N/a	Rap Rhymes! Mother Goose on the Loose
"Two Fingers"	1994	—N/a	House Party 3 Soundtrack
"Make Noize"	1994	—N/a	House Party 3 Soundtrack
"How'm I Doin'?"	1994	—N/a	House Party 3 Soundtrack
"Void"	1994	—N/a	House Party 3 Soundtrack
"Here and Now"	1994	—N/a	House Party 3 Soundtrack

=== Videography ===
==== Video singles ====
List of video singles
Title	Details	Notes
Energy	Released: 1990; Label: Select; Format: VHS	Contains the music video for "Energy" from their album Funhouse.

== Filmography ==
- Kid 'n Play (1990)
- The Earth Day Special (1990)
- House Party (1990)
- House Party 2 (1991)
- Class Act (1992)
- Bodyguards (1993)
- House Party 3 (1994)
- House Party: Tonight's the Night (2013)
- House Party (2023)
