= UTFO (album) =

Studio album by UTFO
- Released: 1985
- Studio: Sound Heights (New York)
- Genre: Hip-hop
- Length: 46:28
- Label: Select
- Producer: Full Force

UTFO chronology
UTFO (1985)	Skeezer Pleezer (1986)

Professional ratings
Review scores
Source	Rating
AllMusic	4/5 stars
Robert Christgau	B
The Rolling Stone Album Guide	3/5 stars

UTFO is the debut studio album by American hip-hop group UTFO, released in 1985 by Select Records. The most notable track on the album is "Roxanne, Roxanne"—the track that ignited the Roxanne Wars. The tracks "The Real Roxanne" and "Calling Her a Crab (Roxanne Part 2)" are answer songs.

== Track listing ==
LP release
No.	Title	Length
1.	"Leader of the Pack"	4:59
2.	"Beats and Rhymes"	5:56
3.	"Roxanne, Roxanne"	5:12
4.	"Fairytale Lover"	5:46
5.	"Lisa Lips"	6:03
6.	"Hanging Out"	5:04
7.	"Bite It"	3:52
8.	"The Real Roxanne"	4:31
9.	"Calling Her a Crab (Roxanne Part 2)"	5:05
Total length:		46:28

CD release
No.	Title	Length
1.	"Leader of the Pack"	4:59
2.	"Bite It"	3:52
3.	"Calling Her a Crab (Roxanne Part 2)"	5:05
4.	"Hanging Out"	5:04
5.	"Beats and Rhymes"	5:56
6.	"Roxanne, Roxanne"	5:12
7.	"Lisa Lips"	6:03
8.	"Fairytale Lover"	5:46
9.	"The Real Roxanne"	4:31
Total length:		46:28
