= Skeezer Pleezer =

Studio album by UTFO
- Released: 1986
- Genre: Hip hop
- Label: Select
- Producer: Full Force

UTFO chronology
UTFO (1985)	Skeezer Pleezer (1986)	Lethal (1987)

Skeezer Pleezer is the second album by the American musical group UTFO, released in 1986 on Select Records. Due to personal issues, Educated Rapper was absent from this album, except the track, "Pick Up the Pace." The most notable song was "Split Personality," a paean to dissociative identity disorder. The album was produced by Full Force.

== Critical reception ==
Professional ratings
Review scores
Source	Rating
AllMusic	3/5 stars
Robert Christgau	B
The Rolling Stone Album Guide	2/5 stars

Robert Christgau praised the "cheerfully amoral anticrime versifying of 'Just Watch'."

The Rolling Stone Album Guide opined that "the attempts at singing ... are flat-out disasters." AllMusic noted that UTFO "were essentially already in stylistic retreat as the gimmick tag they picked up for the success of 'Roxanne, Roxanne' was proving difficult to shake."

== Track listing ==
1. "Just Watch"
2. "Where Did You Go?"
3. "We Work Hard"
4. "Kangol & Doc"
5. "The House Will Rock"
6. "Split Personality"
7. "Pick Up the Pace"
8. "Bad Luck Barry"
9. (untitled hidden track)
