= Christopher Martin (rapper) =

American rapper and actor (born 1962)

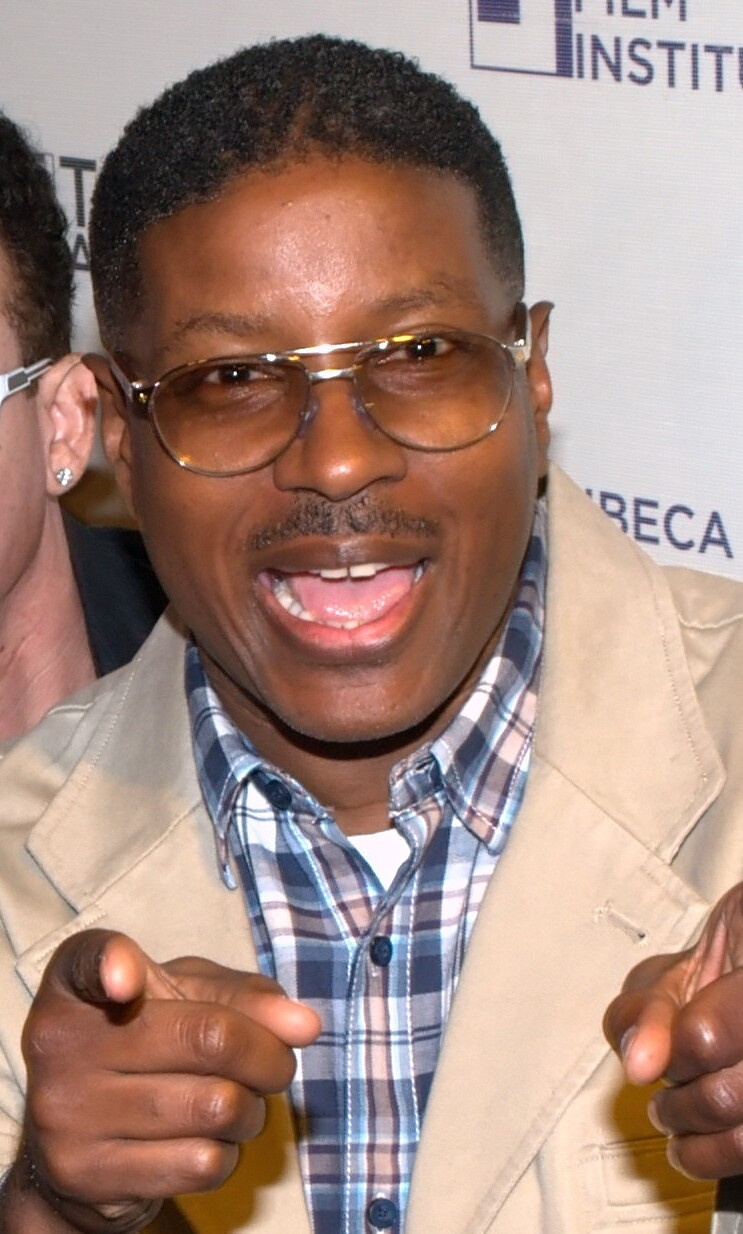
- Martin at the 2010 Tribeca Film Festival

Background information
- Also known as: Play
- Born: July 10, 1962 (age 64)
- Origin: Queens, New York City, U.S.
- Genres: Hip hop
- Occupations: Rapper; actor
- Years active: 1987–present
- Formerly of: Kid 'n Play

Christopher Martin (born July 10, 1962) is an American rapper and actor, who is the latter half of the late 1980s/early 1990s hip-hop/comedy duo Kid 'n Play.

== Career ==
Martin's stage name, Play, is derived from his original MC name, Playboy, which he began using while in a music group, Quicksilver and the Super Lovers, which featured producer Hurby Luv Bug. While performing with this group, Martin met Christopher Reid, who performed as Kid Coolout in the group The Turnout Brothers. When their respective groups dissolved, Martin and Reid decided to perform as a duo. By shortening their nicknames, it would lead to the start of the group Kid 'n Play which featured the pair rapping and dancing together.

With Kid, Play recorded three albums and starred in five hip-hop based comedy films: House Party, House Party 2, Class Act, House Party 3, and House Party: Tonight's the Night.

After the duo split in 1995, Play became a born-again Christian and focused on Christian hip hop. He is the founder and CEO of HP4 Digital, a pre- and post-production multimedia company for film, digital media, and theater.

In 2010, Play starred as an undercover DEA agent in the independent film The Return.

Play was one of the judges for the 8th annual Independent Music Awards to support independent artists.

He studied acting at HB Studio in New York City.

== Personal life ==
Play was married to actress/model Shari Headley from May 1993 until they divorced in June 1995. In April 1994, Headley gave birth to their son, Skyler Martin.

== Discography ==
=== With Kid 'n Play ===
==== Albums ====
- 1988: 2 Hype
- 1990: Funhouse
- 1991: Face the Nation

== Filmography ==
=== Television ===
- Kid 'n Play - Self (1990, animated cartoon, NBC)
- Sealab 2021 - Self (2002, Adult Swim)
- Bigger - Julius (2021, BET)

=== Film ===
- House Party (1990) – Peter "Play" Martin
- House Party 2 (1991) – Peter "Play" Martin
- Class Act (1992) Michael Charles "Blade" Brown
- House Party 3 (1994) – Peter "Play" Martin
- Rising to the Top (1999)
- Welcome to Durham, USA (2007)
- House Party: Tonight's the Night (2013) – Peter "Play" Martin (cameo)
- House Party (2023) - Peter "Play" Martin (silent cameo)
