= Cloud One (band) =

Disco band

Cloud One was a 1970s studio disco band on P & P Records, produced by Peter Brown and Patrick Adams. They were best known for the 1976 album Atmosphere Strut and its title track, and the single "Patty Duke".

== Discography ==
Atmosphere Strut - 1976

1. Spaced Out - Delmar Donnell
2. Charleston Hopscotch - Peter Brown
3. Dust To Dust
4. Atmosphere Strut
5. Disco Juice
6. Doin' It All Night Long

Funky Disco Tracks of Cloud One - 1978

1. Jump, Jump, Jump - 10:28
2. Funky Track - 7:07
3. Stomp Your Feet And Dance - 10:25
4. Music Funk - 10:32
5. Happy Music - 3:09
