= UTFO =

American hip hop band (1983–1992)

- Origin: Brooklyn, New York, U.S.
- Genre: Hip-hop
- Years active: 1983–1992
- Labels: Select; Jive/RCA
- Past members: Doctor Ice; Educated Rapper (EMD); Kangol Kid; Mix Master Ice

UTFO (an abbreviation for Untouchable Force Organization) was an American hip-hop group from Brooklyn, New York.

The group consisted of Kangol Kid (born Shaun Shiller Fequiere; August 10, 1966 – December 18, 2021), Educated Rapper (EMD) (born Jeffrey Campbell; July 4, 1963 – June 3, 2017), Doctor Ice (born Fred Reeves on March 2, 1966), and Mix Master Ice (born Maurice Bailey on April 22, 1965). The group's best-known single is "Roxanne, Roxanne", a hip hop classic, which created a sensation on the hip hop scene soon after it was released and inspired a record-high of 25 answer records in a single year (Roxanne Wars), with estimates ultimately spawning over 100. The most notable remake was done by Marley Marl's protégée Roxanne Shanté, which led to hip hop's first rap beef. "Roxanne, Roxanne" was originally the B-side of the lesser-known single "Hangin' Out". Due to personal issues, Educated Rapper was absent for its second effort, Skeezer Pleezer (1986), which produced one notable track with the song "Split Personality". EMD was, however, on one album track, "Pick Up the Pace", also featured in the movie Krush Groove.

In 2008, "Roxanne, Roxanne" was ranked number 84 on VH1's 100 Greatest Songs of Hip Hop.

== History ==
The group formed in the early 1980s and were originally known as UFO. However, the name was taken by an English rock band so they were forced to change it to UTFO. Kangol Kid and Doctor Ice were originally known as The Keystone Dancers and were a dance duet, before going on to be back-up dancers for Whodini. Eventually, they went on to form UTFO in their hometown of Brooklyn, New York. In 1984, the group signed with Fred Munao's Select Records, and, in the same year, it released its hit single, "Roxanne Roxanne". The group's debut album was produced by R&B group Full Force.

Full Force brought in New York's sound and sampling wizard, Gary Pozner, to help create the sounds and the beats. This was one of the first instances of the new sampling machine, the E-mu Emulator, used on a commercially released record.

Instead of just letting a record tape-loop, the Emulator was used to chop up the drums from Billy Squier’s "The Big Beat". This allowed Full Force to play the sampled acoustic drums via the keyboard, reshaping the groove into a harder, more aggressive hip-hop rhythm. Turntable scratching was traditionally done live by a DJ. Using the Emulator, Pozner helped sample vocal fragments (like the iconic "Ahhhhh" from Beside's "Change the Beat"), mapping them across the keys so they could be played as melodic, pitch-shifting stabs integrated perfectly with the beat.

The single was engineered by Questar Welsh.

The members of UTFO were the first breakdancers to appear on The Phil Donahue Show.

On June 3, 2017, Educated Rapper died following a battle with cancer. On December 18, 2021, Kangol Kid died of colon cancer, at age 55.

== Discography ==
=== Studio albums ===
- UTFO (1985)
- Skeezer Pleezer (1986)
- Lethal (1987)
- Doin' It! (1989)
- Bag It & Bone It (1991)

== See also ==
- Roxanne Wars
