= Christopher Reid (rapper) =

American rapper (born 1964)

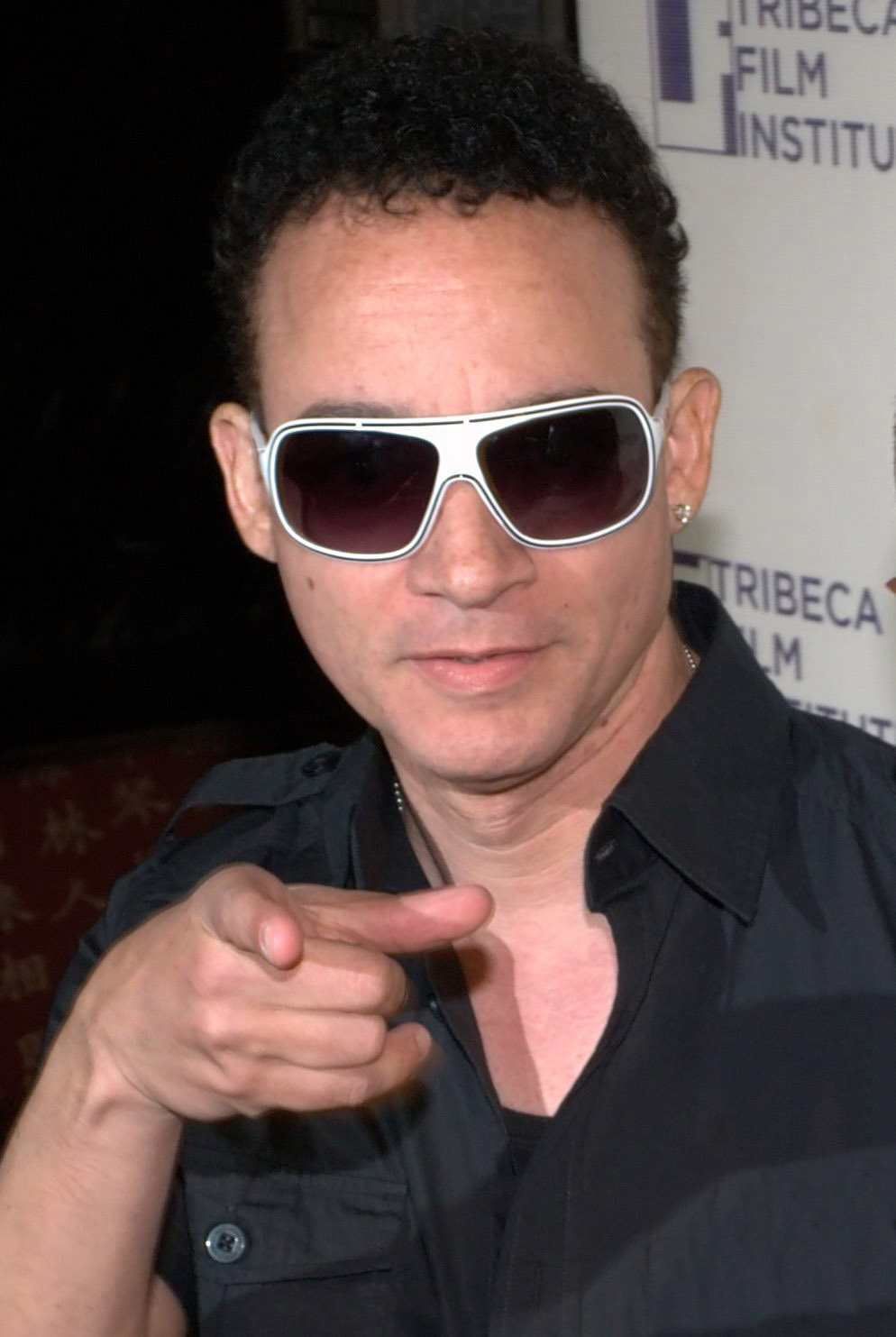
- Reid at the 2010 Tribeca Film Festival

Background information
- Also known as: Kid
- Born: April 5, 1964 (age 62); The Bronx, New York, U.S.
- Genre: Hip hop
- Occupations: Rapper, actor
- Years active: 1983–present
- Formerly of: Kid 'n Play

Christopher Reid (born April 5, 1964), formerly known as Kid (shortened from his original MC name, Kid Coolout), is an American rapper and actor. During the peak of his career with the rap duo Kid 'n Play, with Christopher Martin, Reid was notable for both his seven-inch, vertical hi-top fade and freckles.

== Life and career ==
Reid was born in The Bronx, New York, to a Jamaican father (1928–2019) and an Irish mother (1930–1973). He graduated from the Bronx High School of Science in 1982. He also graduated in 1986 from Lehman College in the Bronx with his B.A. in English after first attending Miles College.

He is best known as one half of late-1980s/early-1990s hip hop musical act Kid 'n Play with fellow rapper/actor Christopher "Play" Martin. Reid was particularly notable for his extremely large hi-top fade hairstyle. Reid has appeared on a number of television programs, including Martin and Sister, Sister, and has served as the host of amateur contest shows, such as Your Big Break and It's Showtime at the Apollo. Reid tours as a stand-up comedian.

Reid's most recent musical contribution has been writing the theme song to HBO's Real Time with Bill Maher. He also appeared on the VH1 reality magician game show Celebracadabra in 2008. Pursuing a solo career, he released a music video for a song called "Why Don't You Stay", on which he raps and sings. He appeared in The Asylum's film War of the Worlds 2: The Next Wave, a sequel to War of the Worlds.

He has been a guest on The Dawn and Drew Show, Comics Unleashed, New England Sports Network's Comedy All-Stars, and Slanted Comedy.

He played the role of The Rhymer on the TV series Supah Ninjas.

He also appears in LMFAO's video for "Sorry for Party Rocking".

In 2012, he broke into voice-over work in the military shooter video game Spec Ops: The Line, in which he plays Lieutenant Alphonso Adams, part of a three-man squad sent into a ruined Dubai to investigate a signal from an MIA military unit, The Damned 33rd.

In an interview on the "Hip-Hop Confessions" podcast, Reid shared that he and Christopher Martin ("Play") were heated about the cancellation of their animated series on NBC. Their anger at the time made their emotions outweigh their business mindset, and they missed out on a major TV deal, which went to Will Smith and DJ Jazzy Jeff and resulted in the hit TV series The Fresh Prince of Bel-Air. Looking back on the time, Reid admitted that he and Martin failed to see past their wants and consider the bigger picture.

He is a fan of the sports radio station in Dallas "The Ticket" 1310 AM/96.7 FM. He is "guest picker" of sports picks on the station and has guest-hosted "The Norm and D Invasion" with Donovan Lewis.

In 2026, Reid revealed that he'd had a heart transplant in 2025. Later in 2026, Reid released a solo record called, "Tin Man", about the experience.

== Discography ==
- 1988: 2 Hype
- 1990: Funhouse
- 1991: Face the Nation

== Filmography ==
- 1990: House Party
- 1990: Kid 'n Play (Saturday morning cartoon)
- 1991: House Party 2
- 1992: Class Act
- 1992: Martin - Guest appearance (Season 1, Episode 6)
- 1994: House Party 3
- 1996-1997: Sister, Sister
- 1998: The Temptations
- 2001: Sealab 2021
- 2003: Pauly Shore Is Dead
- 2005: Barbershop: The Series
- 2008: War of the Worlds 2: The Next Wave
- 2009: Hell's Kitchen
- 2010: Freaknik: The Musical
- 2011: Supah Ninjas
- 2012-2014: Black Dynamite: The Animated Series
- 2013: Mad
- 2013: House Party: Tonight's the Night
- 2021: Apple & Onion
- 2023: House Party

=== Video games ===
- Spec Ops: The Line – 1st Lieutenant Alphonso Adams
