= Select Records =

American record label

- Parent company: Alternative Distribution Alliance
- Founded: 1981
- Founder: Fred Munao
- Genre: Various
- Country of origin: U.S.
- Location: Lyndhurst, New Jersey
- Official website: selectrecordsonline.com

Select Records was an American record label. Among its most popular acts were the Real Roxanne, Chubb Rock, AMG, The Jerky Boys, Kid 'n Play, UTFO, and Whistle. From 1990 to 1995, it had a distribution deal with Elektra Records and is still distributed by the Warner Music Group's Alternative Distribution Alliance. It also had a dance-music sub-label called Active Records.

== Selected discography ==
- 1982: Gary Private: Reach Out
- 1985: UTFO: UTFO
- 1986: UTFO: Skeezer Pleezer
- 1986: Whistle: Whistle
- 1988: Whistle: Transformation
- 1990: Whistle: Always and Forever
- 1988: Kid 'n Play: 2 Hype
- 1988: The Real Roxanne: The Real Roxanne
- 1988: Chubb Rock: Chubb Rock & Howie Tee
- 1988: Damien: Every Dog Has Its Day
- 1989: Chubb Rock: And the Winner Is?
- 1989: Steve X Get Ill: Hey Buddy Buddy
- 1989: Damien: Stop This War
- 1990: Whistle: Get The Love
- 1990: Kid 'n Play: Kid 'n Play's Funhouse
- 1990: Style: In Tone We Trust
- 1991: Chubb Rock: The One
- 1991: Kid 'n Play: Face the Nation
- 1991: Godfather Don: Hazardous
- 1991: The A.T.E.E.M.: A Hero Ain't Nothin' But a Sandwich
- 1992: AMG: Bitch Betta Have My Money
- 1992: Chubb Rock: I Gotta Get Mine Yo
- 1992: Red Hot Lover Tone: Red Hot Lover Tone
- 1992: Brothers Uv Da Blakmarket: Ruff Life
- 1994: M.O.P.: To the Death
- 1995: Red Hot Lover Tone: #1 Player
- 1995: AMG: Ballin Outta Control
- 1995: Hulk Hogan and The Wrestling Boot Band: Hulk Rules
- 1995: King Just: Mystics of the God
- 1997: Chubb Rock: The Mind
- 2002: Jerky Boys: The Best of the Jerky Boys
