= List of Hot Crossover 30 number ones =

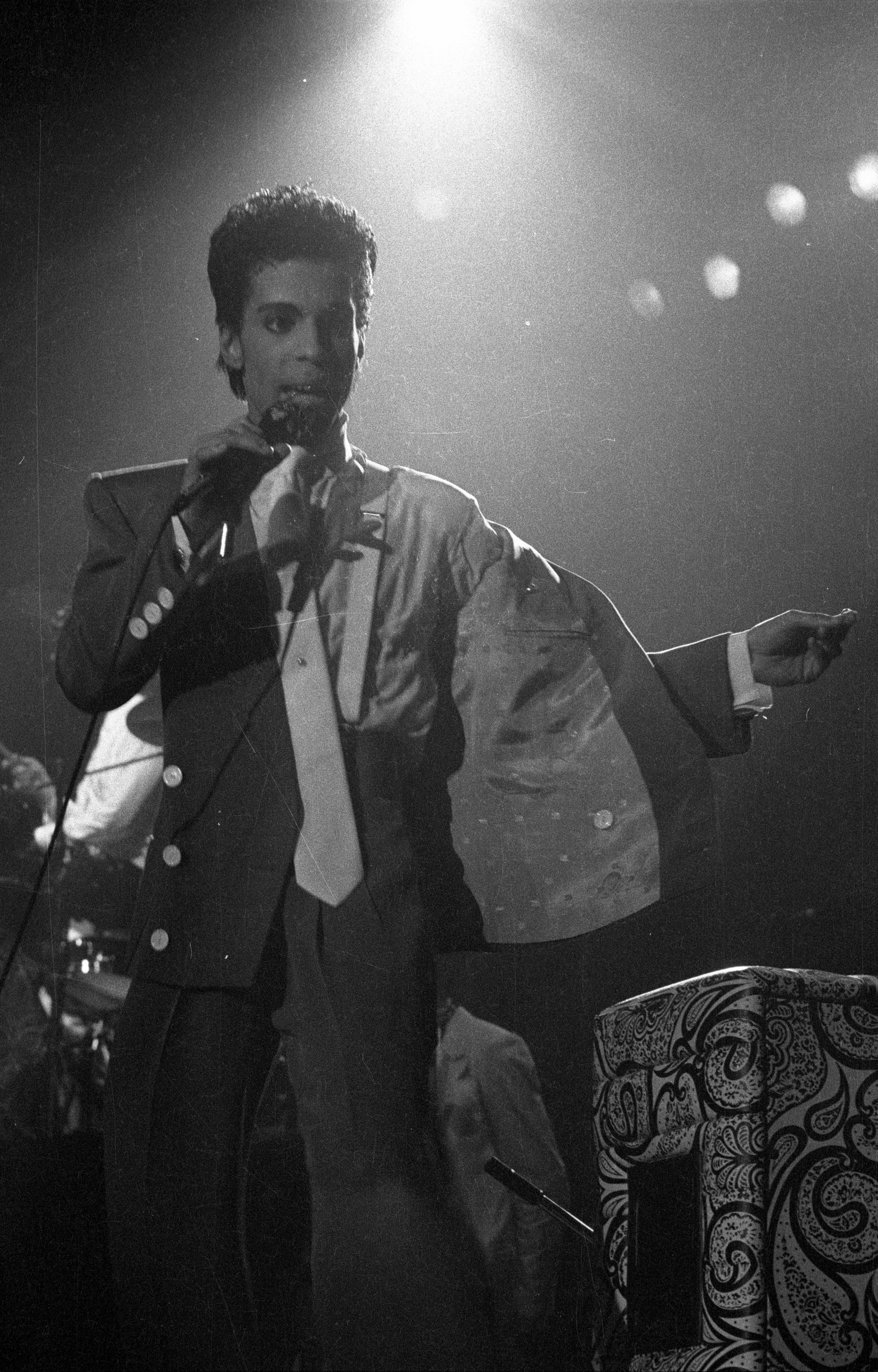
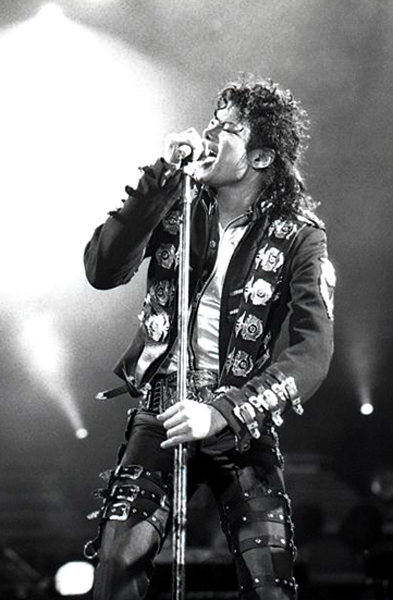
The crossover success of Black artists Prince (left) and Michael Jackson (right) to white audiences contributed to Billboard's creation of the Hot Crossover 30; both reached number one in the chart's first year.

Hot Crossover 30 was a weekly record chart published by American magazine Billboard that ranked the 30 top-performing songs on "crossover" radio stations in the United States featuring a combination of Black, dance and pop music. It was first published in the February 28, 1987, issue of Billboard. The chart was renamed Top 40/Dance on September 9, 1989, and last published on December 1, 1990. Unlike the guitar-oriented rock music heard on contemporary hit radio stations at the time, songs that appeared on the Hot Crossover 30 were often typified by their up-tempo nature, featured drum machines and electronic keyboards, and had varied dance, pop, and R&B influences. Club Nouveau's "Lean on Me" was the first of 65 different songs that topped the chart, and Mariah Carey's "Love Takes Time" was the last.

To formulate the chart, Billboard created a panel of crossover radio stations which reported their current playlists by rank every week. The magazine converted these ranks to points using a weighting system based on the station's Arbitron rating. The most-played song on a station received a base of 25 points while songs ranked below number 40 received 5 points. The points were multiplied 0.5 times if it was played by a station with a weekly cumulative audience of under 100,000 people, 1 time if the station had an audience between 100,000 and 249,999, 1.5 times if the station had an audience between 250,000 and 499,999, 2 times if the station had an audience between 500,000 and 999,999, and 2.5 times if the station had an audience over 1 million. Songs were eligible to chart regardless of a commercial release, as long as they received a combined 175 points from at least 10 stations.

Hot Crossover 30 allowed programmers at burgeoning crossover stations to observe the national popularity of songs on similar stations, some of which had been previously unrecognized because such stations did not contribute to any other Billboard chart. The Hot Crossover 30 panel of stations originally included those that reported exclusively to the chart and some that also reported to either the Hot 100 or Hot Black Singles charts. Effective September 9, 1989, stations formerly exclusive to the Hot Crossover 30 panel also contributed to the Hot 100. By the chart's last issue on December 1, 1990, Billboard considered its composition of songs too similar to the Hot 100's and announced its discontinuation. The Black/dance/pop crossover genre became known as rhythmic contemporary, and Billboard launched the Top 40/Rhythm-Crossover chart on October 3, 1992.

== Chart history ==
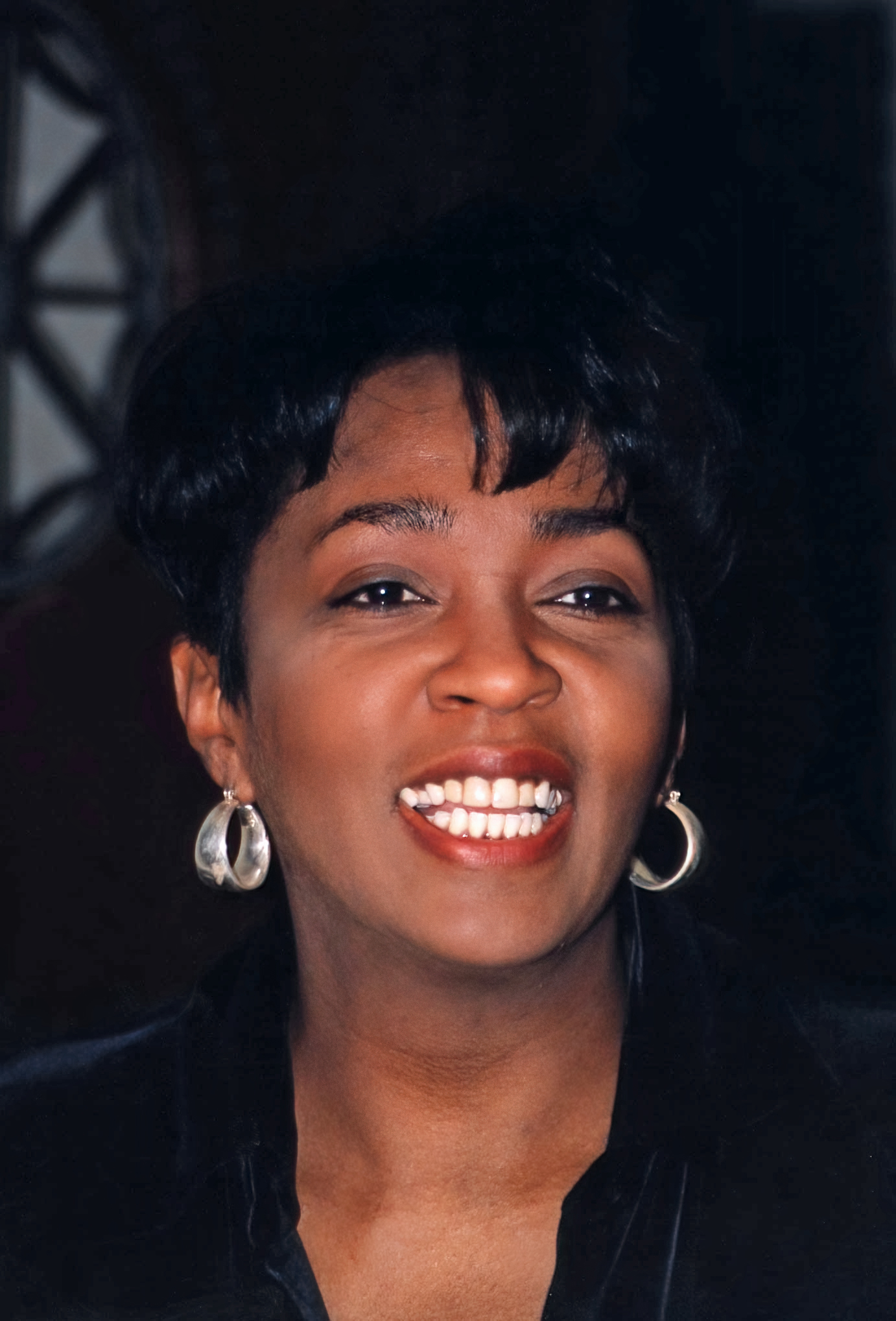
Anita Baker's "Giving You the Best That I Got" spent the most weeks at number one of any song (8)

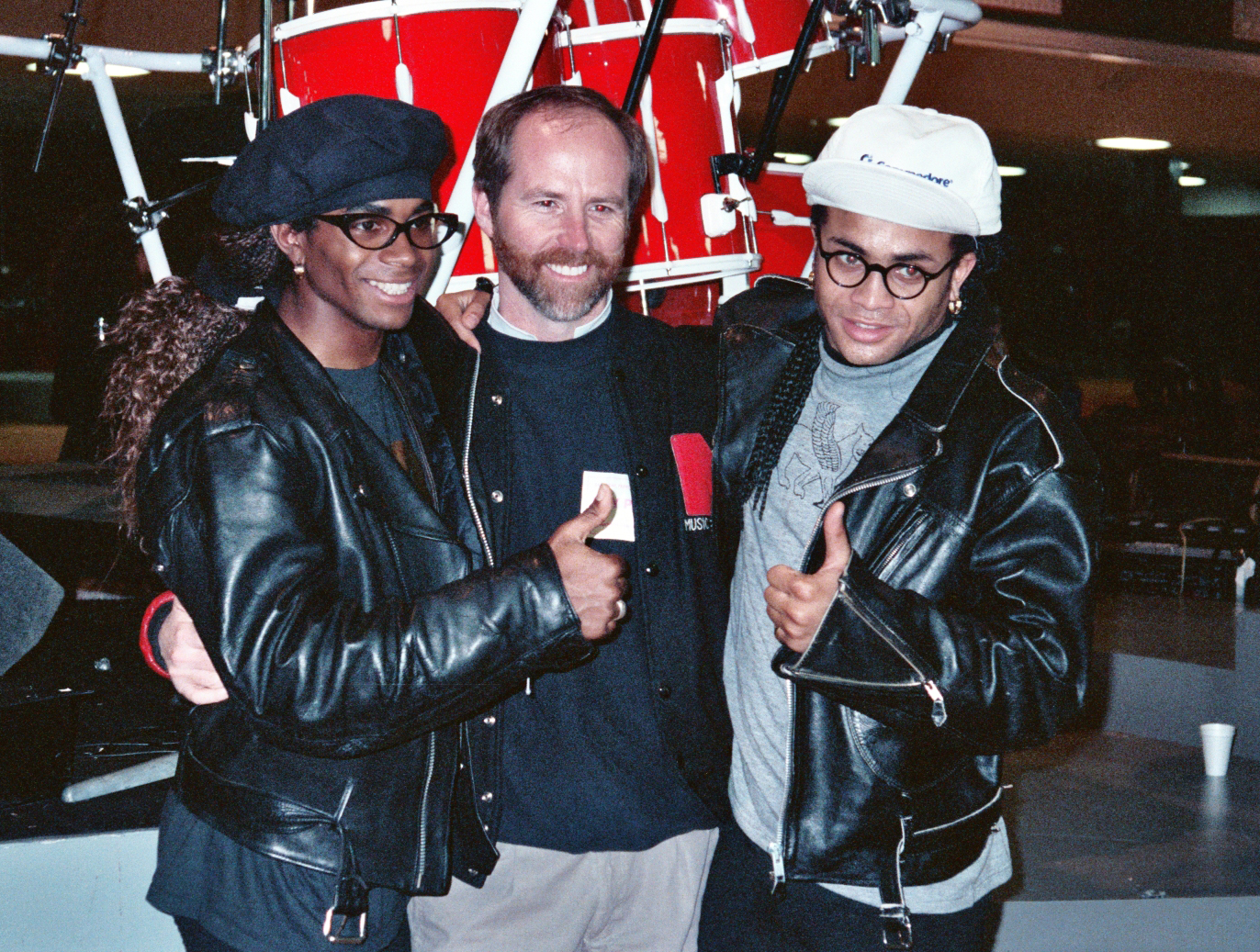
Milli Vanilli spent the most weeks at number one of any artist (14)

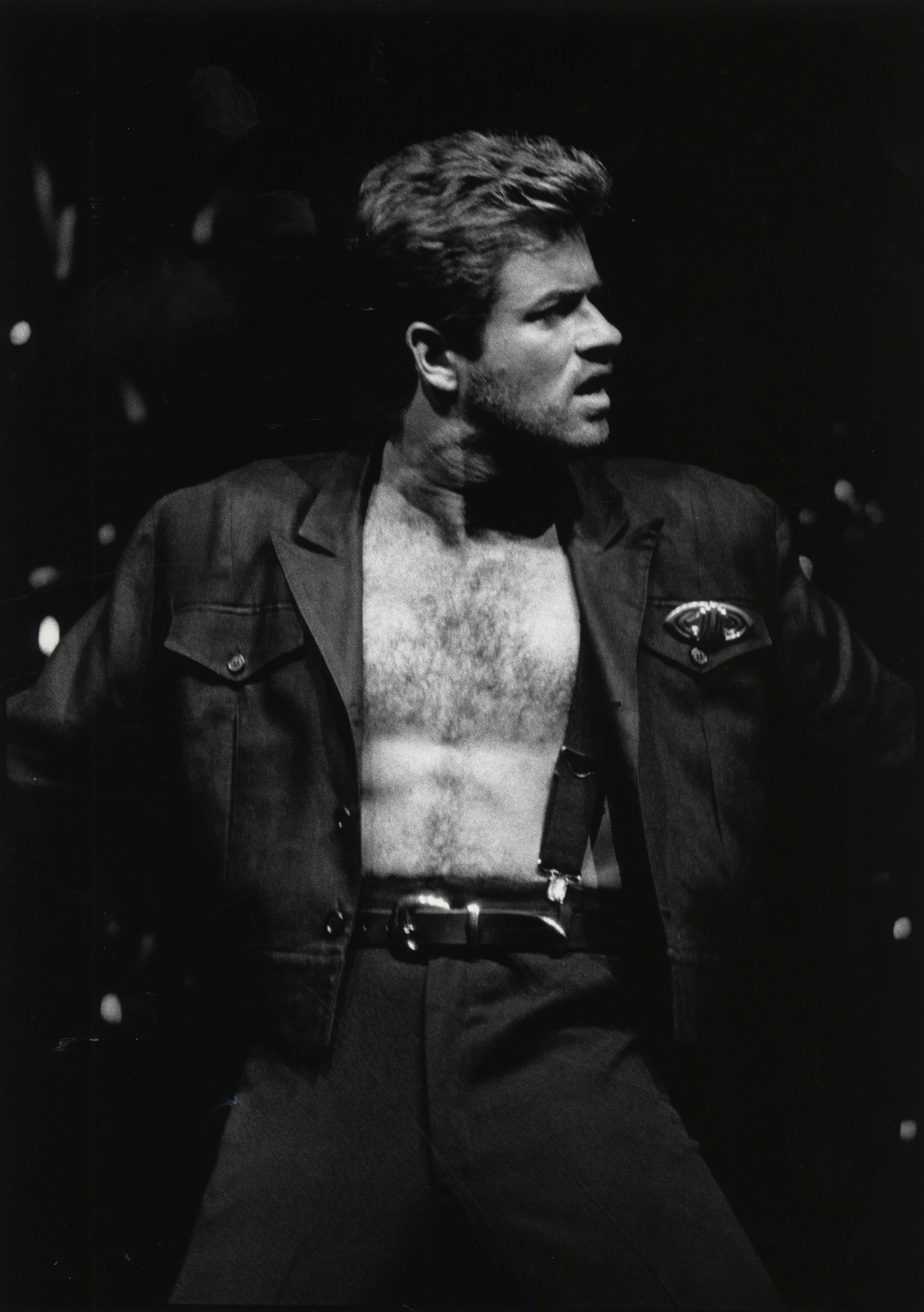
George Michael tied Milli Vanilli as the artist with the most number ones (4)

Hot Crossover 30 number ones chart history
No.	Issue date	Song	Artist(s)	Weeks at number one	Ref.
1	February 28, 1987	"Lean on Me"	Club Nouveau	5	
2	April 4, 1987	"Looking for a New Love"	Jody Watley	3	
3	April 25, 1987	"Sign o' the Times"	Prince	2	
4	May 9, 1987	"Always"	Atlantic Starr	2	
5	May 23, 1987	"Head to Toe"	Lisa Lisa and Cult Jam	3	
6	June 27, 1987	"I Wanna Dance with Somebody (Who Loves Me)"	Whitney Houston	4	
7	July 25, 1987	"The Pleasure Principle"	Janet Jackson	2	
8	August 8, 1987	"I Want Your Sex"	George Michael	1	
9	August 15, 1987	"Who's That Girl"	Madonna	4	
10	September 12, 1987	"Lost in Emotion"	Lisa Lisa and Cult Jam	5	
11	October 17, 1987	"Bad"	Michael Jackson	4	
12	November 14, 1987	"I Think We're Alone Now"	Tiffany	3	
13	December 5, 1987	"Shake Your Love"	Debbie Gibson	2	
14	December 19, 1987	"So Emotional"	Whitney Houston	4	
15	January 16, 1988	"The Way You Make Me Feel"	Michael Jackson	3	
16	February 6, 1988	"Pump Up the Volume"	MARRS	2	
17	February 20, 1988	"Never Gonna Give You Up"	Rick Astley	3	
18	March 12, 1988	"Father Figure"	George Michael	2	
19	March 26, 1988	"Man in the Mirror"	Michael Jackson	3	
20	April 16, 1988	"Get Outta My Dreams, Get into My Car"	Billy Ocean	2	
21	April 30, 1988	"Where Do Broken Hearts Go"	Whitney Houston	2	
22	May 14, 1988	"Nite and Day"	Al B. Sure!	1	
23	May 21, 1988	"One More Try"	George Michael	6	
24	July 2, 1988	"Mercedes Boy"	Pebbles	2	
25	July 16, 1988	"Sign Your Name"	Terence Trent D'Arby	5	
26	August 20, 1988	"If It Isn't Love"	New Edition	1	
27	August 27, 1988	"Monkey"	George Michael	3	
28	September 17, 1988	"I'll Always Love You"	Taylor Dayne	3	
29	October 8, 1988	"Red Red Wine"	UB40	4	
30	November 5, 1988	"Giving You the Best That I Got"	Anita Baker	5	
31	December 10, 1988	"My Prerogative"	Bobby Brown	1	
re	December 17, 1988	"Giving You the Best That I Got"	Anita Baker	3	
32	January 7, 1989	"Dial My Heart"	The Boys	3	
33	January 21, 1989	"Wild Thing"	Tone Loc	5	
34	February 25, 1989	"Straight Up"	Paula Abdul	1	
35	March 4, 1989	"Girl You Know It's True"	Milli Vanilli	6	
36	April 15, 1989	"Funky Cold Medina"	Tone Loc	2	
37	April 29, 1989	"Like a Prayer"	Madonna	3	
38	May 20, 1989	"Every Little Step"	Bobby Brown	1	
39	May 27, 1989	"I'll Be Loving You (Forever)"	New Kids on the Block	5	
40	July 1, 1989	"Baby Don't Forget My Number"	Milli Vanilli	1	
41	July 8, 1989	"I Like It"	Dino	1	
42	July 15, 1989	"Secret Rendezvous"	Karyn White	2	
43	July 29, 1989	"On Our Own"	Bobby Brown	5	
44	September 2, 1989	"Cold Hearted"	Paula Abdul	2	
45	September 16, 1989	"Girl I'm Gonna Miss You"	Milli Vanilli	3	
46	October 7, 1989	"Miss You Much"	Janet Jackson	5	
47	November 11, 1989	"Blame It on the Rain"	Milli Vanilli	4	
48	December 9, 1989	"Back to Life (However Do You Want Me)"	Soul II Soul featuring Caron Wheeler	1	
49	December 16, 1989	"Pump Up the Jam"	Technotronic	4	
50	January 13, 1990	"Two to Make It Right"	Seduction	4	
51	February 10, 1990	"Opposites Attract"	Paula Abdul	3	
52	March 3, 1990	"Escapade"	Janet Jackson	4	
53	March 31, 1990	"I'll Be Your Everything"	Tommy Page	2	
54	April 14, 1990	"All Around the World"	Lisa Stansfield	2	
55	May 5, 1990	"Nothing Compares 2 U"	Sinéad O'Connor	2	
56	May 19, 1990	"Vogue"	Madonna	4	
57	June 16, 1990	"Poison"	Bell Biv DeVoe	3	
58	July 7, 1990	"Step by Step"	New Kids on the Block	1	
59	July 14, 1990	"Hold On"	En Vogue	1	
60	July 21, 1990	"Rub You the Right Way"	Johnny Gill	2	
61	August 4, 1990	"Vision of Love"	Mariah Carey	3	
62	August 25, 1990	"Do Me!"	Bell Biv DeVoe	6	
63	October 6, 1990	"My, My, My"	Johnny Gill	1	
64	October 13, 1990	"Ice Ice Baby"	Vanilla Ice	7	
65	December 1, 1990	"Love Takes Time"	Mariah Carey	1	
