= Zebrahead (soundtrack) =

Zebrahead (Soundtrack From the Original Motion Picture)

Soundtrack album by Various artists
- Released: October 13, 1992
- Recorded: 1992
- Studio: Chung King Studios (New York, NY); Studio 4 Recording (Philadelphia, PA); Soundtrack Studios (New York, NY); Battery Studios (New York, NY); Time Capsule (New York, NY); Kala Recording (Atlanta, GA); The Hit Factory (New York, NY)
- Genre: Hip hop; R&B
- Length: 41:16
- Label: Ruffhouse; Columbia; Sony
- Producer: Mark Pearson (exec.); MC Serch (also exec.); The LG Experience; Craig Cheng; Chris "Tricky" Stewart; Damion Hall; Sean Hall; Herman Lang; Large Professor; Joe "The Butcher" Nicolo; John Greene; MC Breed; Oatie Kato; Portrait; Todd Ray; Total Trak Productions

Singles from Zebrahead
- 1. "Halftime" Released: October 13, 1992

Professional ratings
Review scores
Source	Rating
AllMusic	3/5 stars

Zebrahead (Soundtrack From the Original Motion Picture) is the soundtrack to Anthony Drazan's 1992 drama film Zebrahead. It was released on October 13, 1992 via Ruffhouse Records and Sony Music Entertainment. The soundtrack is best known for containing Nas's debut single "Halftime".

== Track listing ==
No.	Title	Writer(s)	Producer(s)	Length
1.	"Halftime" (performed by Nasty Nas)	N. Jones	Large Professor	4:20
2.	"Dog from Around the Way" (performed by AMG)	J. Lewis	Total Trak Productions	3:39
3.	"¿Do the Digs Dug?" (performed by The Goats)	E.J. Simpson; J. D'Angelo; M. Stoyanoff-Williams; P. Shupe; W. Braveman	Joe "The Butcher" Nicolo; Oatie Kato	4:55
4.	"Puff the Head" (performed by MC Serch)	M. Berrin; R. Simpson	The LG Experience	3:58
5.	"Diary of a Mad Bitch" (performed by Boss)	I. Moore; L. Laws; M. Berrin; T. Ray	MC Serch; Todd Ray	3:03
6.	"Good Time" (performed by Kool Moe Dee)	M. Dewese	The LG Experience	3:56
7.	"Colorless Love" (performed by Ex Girlfriend)	C. Stewart; J. Robertson; M. Berrin; M. Boyd; S. Hall; S. Francis; T. Hunter	Chris "Tricky" Stewart; Sean Hall	4:19
8.	"Sister & Brother" (performed by MC Breed)	E. Breed	MC Breed; Herman Lang	3:50
9.	"Holding On" (performed by John Forté & Damion Hall)	D. Hall; J. Greene	Craig Cheng; Damion Hall; John Greene	4:38
10.	"Precious Moments" (performed by Portrait)	I. Washington; M. Saulsberry; P. Johnson	Portrait	4:38
Total length:				41:16

== Personnel ==
- Kevin Reynolds – engineering (track 1)
- Manuel Lecuona – engineering & mixing (track 3)
- Joseph Mario Nicolo – engineering & mixing (track 3)
- Anton Pukshansky – engineering (track 5)
- Jeff Toone – engineering (tracks: 4, 7, 9)
- Tony Dawsey – mastering
- Mark Pearson – executive producer
- Marcus Wyns – art direction
