= Let the Beat Hit 'Em =

Single by Lisa Lisa and Cult Jam

from the album Straight Outta Hell's Kitchen
- Released: 1991
- Recorded: 1991
- Genre: Hip house; pop hip hop
- Length: 4:38
- Label: Columbia
- Songwriters: Robert Clivillés; David Cole; Alan Friedman; Duran Ramos
- Producer: David Cole & Robert Clivillés

Lisa Lisa and Cult Jam singles chronology
"Kiss the Tears Away" (1989)	"Let the Beat Hit 'Em" (1991)	"Where Were You When I Needed You" (1991)

Music video
- "Let the Beat Hit 'Em" on YouTube

"Let the Beat Hit 'Em" is a song by American urban contemporary band Lisa Lisa and Cult Jam, released in 1991 by Columbia Records as the first single from their fourth and final studio album, Straight Outta Hell's Kitchen (1991). The song was produced by David Cole & Robert Clivillés, who also co-wrote it with Alan Friedman and Duran Ramos. It spent one week at number-one on the US Billboard R&B chart in the week of September 14, 1991, and also reached No. 37 on the Billboard Hot 100. On the US dance charts, it was the third and final number-one for the group. "Let the Beat Hit 'Em" also peaked at number-one on the Canadian RPM Dance/Urban chart. The accompanying music video was directed by German director Marcus Nispel, and shot in black-and-white.

== Samples ==
On "Let the Beat Hit 'Em", Lisa Lisa and Cult Jam sampled "Ghetto Heaven" by The Family Stand, The Emotions' 1977 single "Best of My Love" and "Set It Off" by Strafe. and Donald Byrd Think Twice.

"Let the Beat Hit 'Em" was sampled by Kylie Minogue on the track "Too Much of a Good Thing" off her 1991 album Let's Get To It.

== Critical reception ==
Jose F. Promis from AllMusic named "Let the Beat Hit 'Em" as a "surprise 1991 house-dance smash". J.D. Considine from The Baltimore Sun felt the music is "relentlessly danceable", describing the song as "insistent". Larry Flick from Billboard magazine wrote that here, the trio "ends a two-year recording silence with an insinuating pop/hip-hopper. Trademark production style of David Cole and Robert Clivillés is a fine complement to Lisa's appealing vocals. Pumped house version has already begun to jam in the clubs, while top 40 and urban radio should be joining the party any second now." He added that the track "sported a deliciously contagious groove and Lisa's most spirited vocal in eons."

Pan-European magazine Music & Media stated that it's produced by the "hottest team around lately", "for whom nothing can stop these beats anymore." They also noted that "just like on C&C's records, the main line of the chorus will remain in the listener's head for weeks." A reviewer from People Magazine felt the song "reflect the producers' trademark '90s disco sound, minus the rock muscle that makes the Music Factory hum". Al Walentis from Reading Eagle said the song "serves up the trio's most irresistible hook" since their 1987 hit "Head to Toe". Stewart Walker from Toledo Blade remarked that "Let The Beat Hit 'Em" exemplified the "high-energy club feel" of the first half of the Straight Outta Hell's Kitchen album".

== Impact and legacy ==
In 1995, British DJ Pete Tong named "Let the Beat Hit 'Em" one of his "classic cuts", adding, "One of Clivilles & Cole's best remixes. You often find if you go into the studio where people are remixing there are loads of 12 inches lying on the floor because people are constantly inspired by what others are doing. In '91/'92 it was the perfect execution of what was going on in New York City."

In 1996, British DJ and presenter Trevor Nelson chose the song as one of his favourites, "I chose this because C&C Music Factory wanted to make the perfect commercial dance record and, out of all the competition, this is the one, C&C is the best producer of dance records. Even though it's faster than most stuff I play now, it's always worked on the dance floor. It's not the coolest record I've ever bought but it's the most fun."

In 1997 dance vocalist Shèna did a cover of "Let The Beat Hit Em" based on Clivilles' "Part Two" remix from 1991 and charted at number 28 in the UK Chart. This version was then used by Dutch DJ duo Sound De-Zign for their 2001 track "Happiness", which reached number 19 in the UK charts.

In 2012, Polish Porcys ranked "Let the Beat Hit 'Em" number 68 in their list of "100 Singles 1990–1999".

In 2022, the track "B.O.T.A. (Baddest Of Them All)" by Eliza Rose and Interplanetary Criminal sampled the LL w/Love RC Mix and reached Number 1 on the singles chart in both the UK and Ireland.

== Track listings ==
- 7" single
1. "Let the Beat Hit 'Em" (radio mix 1) – 4:38
2. "Let the Beat Hit 'Em" (5 minute house version) – 5:02
- US 12" Original Release (656950-5)
1. "Let the Beat Hit 'Em" (The Brand New Super Pumped-Up C&C Vocal Club Mix) – 7:28
2. "Let the Beat Hit 'Em" (Radio Mix 1) – 4:38
3. "Let the Beat Hit 'Em" (5 Minute House Version) – 5:02
- US 12" #2 (657393-6)
1. "Let the Beat Hit 'Em" (Paradise Garage Club Mix) – 7:03
2. "Let the Beat Hit 'Em" (5 Minute House Mix) – 5:02
3. "Let the Beat Hit 'Em" (The Pop Radio Edit) – 4:00
- US 12" #3 (44 73923)
1. "Let the Beat Hit 'Em" (LL w/Love RC Mix) – 8:24
2. "Let the Beat Hit 'Em" (Clivilles/Cole Club/Dub Mix) – 8:48

== Charts ==
=== Weekly charts ===
Chart (1991)	Peak position
Australia (ARIA)	72
Belgium (Ultratop 50 Flanders)	42
Canada Dance/Urban (RPM)	1
Europe (Eurochart Hot 100)	33
Europe (European Dance Radio)	24
France (SNEP)	36
Ireland (IRMA)	27
Netherlands (Dutch Top 40)	35
Netherlands (Single Top 100)	30
UK Singles (OCC)	17
UK Airplay (Music Week)	16
UK Dance (Music Week)	2
UK Club Chart (Record Mirror)	2
US Billboard Hot 100	37
US Hot R&B Singles (Billboard)	1
US Hot Dance Club Play (Billboard)	1
US Hot Dance Music/Maxi-Singles Sales (Billboard)	1
US Cash Box Top 100	82

=== Year-end charts ===
Chart (1991)	Position
UK Club Chart (Record Mirror)	9

== See also ==
- Number-one dance hits of 1991 (USA)
- List of number-one R&B singles of 1991 (U.S.)
