= Lisa Lisa =

American singer

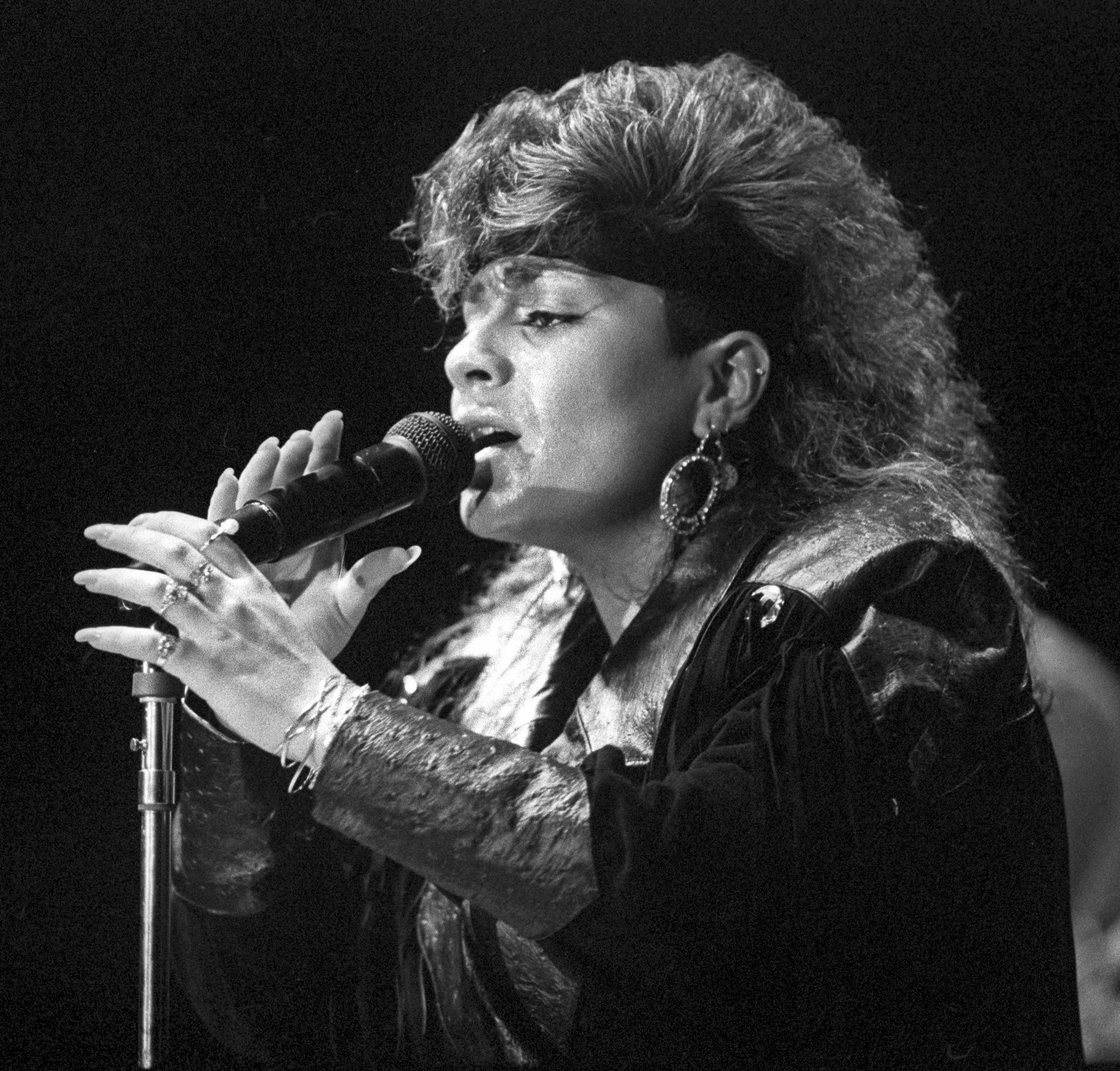
- Lisa Lisa performing in 1987
- Born: Lisa Velez; January 15, 1967 (age 59); New York City, U.S.
- Occupation: Singer
- Musical career
- Genres: Pop; R&B
- Instrument: Vocals
- Years active: 1984–present
- Labels: Pendulum; Mass Appeal

Lisa Velez (born January 15, 1967), better known by her stage name Lisa Lisa, is an American singer. She rose to fame in the 1980s as one-third of the band Lisa Lisa and Cult Jam.

== Early life ==
Velez was born in January 1967 in Hell's Kitchen in New York City as the youngest of ten to a religious mother, who supported the family by babysitting, and an absentee father. Of Puerto Rican descent, Velez learned to speak Spanish at home and English in school. She sang in her church choir, at the Church of the Sacred Heart of Jesus, along with her six sisters, and was an A student at Julia Richman High School on the Upper East Side. At Sacred Heart she studied alongside several future members of the Irish-American criminal organization, the Westies. In school she was also part of a traveling singing group that sang Motown hits and songs from old Broadway musicals.

== Career ==
Lisa Lisa and Cult Jam was founded when Velez successfully auditioned for the Brooklyn production team Full Force. She met drummer Mike Hughes at Funhouse, a Manhattan underage club that she frequented to be discovered. She described the atmosphere as, "a young place, no liquor served in that place at all, so I kinda liked it. I used to dance a lot, but I was always aware of where I was turning, so I would watch and find out who's who, where's where." Hughes spotted her, finding her attractive, and asked her to audition for the production team. She took the subway to a house in Brooklyn: her first trip to the borough without her protective older brother, who later became her bodyguard.

With Hughes and Alex "Spanador" Moseley, Lisa Lisa and Cult Jam recorded their debut single, "I Wonder If I Take You Home", soon after forming in 1985, releasing it as an independent single. The group quickly signed to Columbia Records, which re-released the single, and it climbed into the R&B top ten in the US and the top 20 in the UK. The group amassed a number of hit songs throughout the 1980s.

Velez said of her moniker "I guess they had the type of idea like, okay, [the U.T.F.O. hit] 'Roxanne, Roxanne' worked, why not Lisa Lisa? I thought it was cute because I knew it would cause controversy, talk." About getting paid, Velez expressed "I don't think about the money. I'm not doing this for the money. I was pulling in 600 to 700 a week when I was working at Benetton, so it doesn't mean shit to me. I'm just doing this 'cause I want to sing."

By the end of the '80s, the group's success had begun to decline. Their fourth and final album, Straight Outta Hell's Kitchen, was less of a commercial success, though it did include a hit with "Let the Beat Hit 'Em", which reached the top 40 on the US pop chart and was a hit on both the R&B and club charts. The group disbanded in 1991, and Velez pursued both solo singing and acting careers, while Moseley and Hughes went on to do other projects.

Lisa Lisa released a solo album called LL77 in 1994, which included the moderate club hit "When I Fell in Love" (which was remixed by Junior Vasquez) and the notable single "Skip to My Lu", which hit No. 38 on the R&B chart. She resurfaced circa 2001 on the Nickelodeon series Taina, in which she played the title character's mother. In June 2008, Lisa Lisa presented an award at the BET Awards, sparking interest that she may be planning a comeback.

In 2009, she released Life 'n Love, an album of new material on Mass Appeal Entertainment featuring the single "Can't Wait" with guest rapper Pitbull. The album features a cover version of the song "Stand" which was originally performed by Taylor Dayne on her 1998 album Naked without You. In March 2014, she appeared with Stevie B., TKA, Sa-Fire, and others at the eighth annual Forever Freestyle showcase at the Lehman College Center for the Performing Arts in the Bronx.

In June 2019, Lisa Lisa signed with Snoop Dogg's Army, part of the Snoop Dogg Entertainment Company.

In February 2025, Lifetime premiered the biopic of Lisa Lisa, Can You Feel The Beat: The Lisa Lisa Story, starring Lisa Lisa as her own mother.

== Personal life ==
Lisa turned down the role of Lisa in the movie Coming to America, offered to her by Eddie Murphy.

Velez was diagnosed with ductal carcinoma while on tour when she was 21. She underwent chemotherapy during the tour and kept her diagnosis and treatment private from her bandmates and family.

== Discography ==
=== Studio albums ===
Title	Album details
LL77	Release: January 25, 1994; Formats: LP, CD; Label: Pendulum
Life 'n Love	Release: July 14, 2009; Formats: CD, digital download; Label: Mass Appeal

=== Singles ===
List of singles, with selected chart positions and certifications
Title	Year	Peak chart positions						Album
Title	Year	US Bub.	US R&B	US Dance	CAN	NLD	UK	Album
"Skip to My Lu"	1993	5	38	—	16	42	34	LL77
"When I Fell in Love"	1994	—	96	28	—	—	—	LL77
"Can't Wait" (feat. Pitbull)	2009	—	—	—	—	—	—	Life 'n Love
"—" denotes a recording that did not chart or was not released in that territory.

== Filmography ==
=== Television ===
Year	Title	Role	Notes
2001–02	Taina	Gloria Elana Morales	Main role
2003	Law & Order	Lucy Mireles	Episode: "Smoke"
2020	5th Borough	Ester	Movie
2025	Can You Feel The Beat: The Lisa Lisa Story	Main role	Movie

== See also ==
- Nuyorican – Puerto Ricans located in or around New York City
- Puerto Ricans in New York City
