= Ex Girlfriend (group) =

American girl group

- Also known as: Petite
- Origin: Brooklyn, New York, United States
- Genres: R&B, hip hop, new jack swing
- Years active: 1984–1995; 2008
- Labels: Reprise, Forceful
- Members: Monica Boyd; Julia Robertson; Stacy Francis; Tisha Hunter

Ex Girlfriend was an American girl group whose line-up comprised Monica Boyd, Julia Robertson, Stacy Francis, and Tisha Hunter. The group was originally formed in the mid-1980s under the group name Petite, consisting of Kimberly Davis, Monica Boyd, Julia Robertson, and Tisha Hunter. Shortly after the release of their debut album Teens (1986), the group experienced a lineup change as Davis departed from the group. The group was reformed as Ex Girlfriend in 1989 in Brooklyn, New York by new jack swing group Full Force, with the members adopting the surname "X" as part of their dynamic.

In 1991, Ex Girlfriend was launched into mainstream recognition following the release of their debut album, X Marks the Spot, which contained the singles "Why Can't You Come Home" and "You (You're the One for Me)". Following the release of their second album It's a Woman Thang (1994), the group disbanded in 1995 and pursued solo endeavors.

== History ==
=== 1984–1988: Early beginnings and Petite ===
In 1984, Kimberly Davis, Julia Robertson, Monica Boyd, and Tisha Hunter formed a female group known as Petite. The group met during their attendance at Fiorello H. LaGuardia High School of Music & Art and Performing Arts. In 1985, they were signed to York's Records in Brooklyn, New York. Later that year, they released their first single "So Fine". The single peaked at number 86 on Billboard's Hot R&B/Hip-Hop Songs chart. They released their debut album Teens in 1986. After the album failed to chart or generate a mainstream recognition outside of New York, the group began doing session work and became temporary background vocalists. Davis left the group and pursued a solo career after feeling creatively restricted within the group. She was replaced by Kennethia "Kenne" Pierce in 1988. Later that year, Kenne released a single "What Is He To You?", which featured Petite. In 1989, Pierce left the group.

=== 1989–1992: Ex Girlfriend and X Marks the Spot ===
In 1989, Petite attracted the attention of male group Full Force. They were managed by Full Force and signed to the group's Forceful Records, a subsidiarity label of Reprise Records in late 1989. Shortly after adding Stacy Francis to the lineup, the group changed their name to Ex Girlfriend. The group members adopted the surname 'X' as part of a group concept of "female militarism". They performed background vocals for Lisa Lisa and Cult Jam on the song "Just Git It Together" (1989) and on Jasmine Guy's single "Try Me" (1990).

In mid-1991, Ex Girlfriend released their debut single "Why Can't You Come Home". The single peaked in the top-five on Billboard's Hot R&B/Hip-Hop Songs chart. The success of the single invited them to perform on various TV shows including Soul Train. In October 1991, they released their album X Marks the Spot which peaked at number thirty-nine on the Top R&B/Hip-Hop Albums chart. The album's second single "You (You're the One for Me)" peaked at number thirty-five on the R&B chart. The album's final single "With All My Heart" failed to chart.

In October 1992, Ex Girlfriend released a single "Colorless Love" which appeared on the soundtrack for drama film Zebrahead.

=== 1994–1995: It's a Woman Thang and disbandment ===
In mid-1994, Ex Girlfriend released "X In Your Sex". In August 1994, Ex Girlfriend released their second album It's a Woman Thang. The album failed to chart. After the second single "You for Me" failed to chart, the overall project ultimately became a commercial failure. In 1995, the group dissolved and each member pursued solo endeavors.

== Reunion and aftermath ==
After their formal disbandment, all members pursued solo careers and have each experienced different levels of success. Francis landed several leading role in theatre plays including Mama, I Want To Sing! and the Broadway production of Footloose. Hunter sang background vocals and created the vocal arrangements for Yvette Michele's "DJ Keep Playin' (Get Your Music On)" (1997). Boyd became a professional makeup artist.

In July 2008, Ex Girlfriend briefly reunited for the remainder of the year. In 2009, Hunter released a single "Kick Out the Jams". In 2011, Francis became a finalist in first season of The X Factor USA. In May 2016, Robertson released a duet single "Body Rush" with singer-songwriter Norm Adams. They released another single "Home Tonight" in 2017, followed by a holiday song entitled "My Kinda Christmas" in 2018.

On May 5, 2023, Julia Robertson released her long-awaited solo debut single "HEAT" co-written and produced by Erick "Mr. Major" Shervington. Her second single "Doin' It" was released on August 23, 2024 worldwide. Julia is co-writing and putting the finishing touches on her debut solo album, “The Audio-Biography of Julia Robertson" with Mr. Major helming all production duties.

== Discography ==
=== Albums ===
Title	Album details	Peak chart positions
Title	Album details	US R&B
X Marks the Spot	Release date: October 5, 1991; Label: Reprise; Format: CD, cassette	37
It's a Woman Thang	Release date: August 30, 1994; Label: Reprise; Format: CD, cassette	—

=== Singles ===
Title	Year	Chart positions			Album
Title	Year	U.S	U.S R&B	U.S Radio	Album
"Why Can't You Come Home"	1991	78	5	57	X Marks the Spot
"You (You're the One for Me)"	1991	104	35	—	X Marks the Spot
"With All My Heart"	1991	—	—	—	X Marks the Spot
"Colorless Love"	1992	—	—	—	Zebrahead - OST
"X In Your Sex"	1994	—	47	—	It's a Woman Thang
"You for Me"	1994	—	—	—	It's a Woman Thang
