= Straight Outta Hell's Kitchen =

Studio album by Lisa Lisa and Cult Jam
- Released: August 20, 1991
- Recorded: 1991
- Studios: Sound Lab, NY
- Genre: Dance-pop
- Length: 62:02
- Labels: Columbia; CK-46035
- Producers: David Cole, Robert Clivillés, Full Force

Lisa Lisa and Cult Jam chronology
Straight to the Sky (1989)	Straight Outta Hell's Kitchen (1991)	LL77 (1994)

Singles from Straight Outta Hell's Kitchen
- 1. "Let the Beat Hit 'Em" Released: 1991; 2. "Where Were You When I Needed You" Released: September 12, 1991; 3. "Forever" Released: October 31, 1991; 4. "Something 'Bout Love" Released: March 1, 1992

Professional ratings
Review scores
Source	Rating
AllMusic	4/5 stars
Entertainment Weekly	B+

Straight Outta Hell's Kitchen is the fourth and final studio album by Lisa Lisa and Cult Jam. The album was released on August 20, 1991. It is best known for the lead track "Let the Beat Hit 'Em" which reached #1 on the Billboard R&B and Dance charts. The only other single released from the album was the ballad "Where Were You When I Needed You". The album's title is named for the Manhattan neighborhood in which lead vocalist Lisa Velez grew up and lived until the mid-2000s. The first half of the album was produced by C+C Music Factory's David Cole and Robert Clivillés, and the second half was produced, as with the previous Lisa Lisa and Cult Jam albums, by Full Force.

== Track listing ==
No.	Title	Writer(s)	Length
1.	"Introduction (Interlude #1)/Something 'bout Love"	Robert Clivillés / Duran Ramos	5:03
2.	"Let the Music Play"	Robert Clivillés / David Cole	4:43
3.	"Let the Beat Hit 'Em"	Robert Clivillés / David Cole / Alan Friedman / Duran Ramos	4:38
4.	"You + Me = Love"	Robert Clivillés / Duran Ramos	4:53
5.	"Rainstorm Interlude/Don't Say Goodbye"	Robert Clivillés / Duran Ramos	6:32
6.	"Forever"	Robert Clivillés / Duran Ramos	4:14
7.	"Let It Go"	Full Force	6:27
8.	"I Like It, I Like It"	Full Force	4:39
9.	"Love Will Get Us By"	Full Force	5:46
10.	"Where Were You When I Needed You"	Full Force	4:37
11.	"Do It Like That"	Full Force	4:51
12.	"Sensuality"	Ernie Isley / O'Kelly Isley / Ronald Isley / Rudolph Isley / Chris Jasper	5:39
Total length:			62:02

== Personnel ==
Adapted from AllMusic

- Karen Bernod – background vocals
- Robert Clivillés – arranger, composer, drums, editing, keyboard arrangements, mixing, percussion, photo imaging, producer, vocal arrangement
- David Cole – arranger, composer, keyboard arrangements, keyboards, mixing, producer, vocal arrangement, background vocals
- Carol Cooper – executive producer
- Deborah Cooper – background vocals
- Ricky Crespo – editing
- Jim De Barros – design
- Pete Diorio – engineer, mixing
- Ex Girlfriend – background vocals
- Alan Friedman – composer, programming
- Full Force – arranger, composer, executive producer, mixing, vocal arrangement, background vocals
- Michael Hughes – arranger, percussion, producer, rap
- Ernie Isley – composer
- O'Kelly Isley – composer
- Ronald Isley – composer
- Rudolph Isley – composer
- Carl James – bass
- Chris Jasper – composer
- Bashiri Johnson – percussion
- Acar S. Key – engineer
- Lisa Lisa – executive producer, photo imaging, primary artist, vocals, background vocals
- Lisa Lisa and Cult Jam – executive producer, performer, primary artist
- Chuck Loeb – guitar
- Fred McFarlane – keyboards
- Veronica McHugh – production coordination
- Cindy Mizelle – background vocals
- Alexander "Spanador" Mosley – arranger, guitar, keyboards, producer
- Ken Nahoum – photography, photo imaging
- Duran Ramos – composer, keyboard arrangements, vocal arrangement
- Cheryl Pepsii Riley – background vocals
- Bob Rosa – editing, mixing
- Steve Salem – executive producer
- Lisa Velez – group member
- Barbara Warren-Pace – producer, production coordination
- Audrey Wheeler – background vocals
- Tim White – photography
- Larry Yasgar – executive producer

== Charts ==
Chart (1991)	Peak position
Australian Albums (ARIA)	129
US Billboard 200	133
