= Cocktail (1988 film) =

1988 film by Roger Donaldson

- Theatrical release poster
- Directed by: Roger Donaldson
- Screenplay by: Heywood Gould
- Based on: Cocktail by Heywood Gould
- Produced by: Ted Field; Robert W. Cort
- Starring: Tom Cruise; Bryan Brown; Elisabeth Shue
- Cinematography: Dean Semler
- Edited by: Neil Travis
- Music by: J. Peter Robinson
- Production companies: Touchstone Pictures; Silver Screen Partners III; Interscope Communications
- Distributed by: Buena Vista Pictures Distribution
- Release date: July 29, 1988 (United States)
- Running time: 103 minutes
- Country: United States
- Language: English
- Budget: $20 million
- Box office: $171.5 million

Cocktail is a 1988 American romantic comedy drama film directed by Roger Donaldson from a screenplay by Heywood Gould, and based on Gould's book of the same name. It stars Tom Cruise, Bryan Brown and Elisabeth Shue. It tells the story of business student Brian Flanagan, who takes up bartending in order to make ends meet.

Released on July 29, 1988, by Buena Vista Pictures (under its adult film label Touchstone Pictures), Cocktail features an original music score composed by J. Peter Robinson. Despite being overwhelmingly panned by critics, and winning the Golden Raspberry Award for Worst Picture, the film was a huge box office success, grossing $171.5 million worldwide against a budget of $20 million, becoming the eighth highest-grossing film of 1988.

== Plot ==
Brian Flanagan is a cocky, naïve, ambitious, charismatic, and initially shallow young man who seeks both get-rich-quick methods and the powerful status it brings.

Brian, recently discharged from the U.S. Army, heads home to New York City where he hopes to land a high-powered business job. He fails and instead works as a bartender while attending business school.

Brian meets Doug Coughlin, an experienced bartender who teaches him flair bartending. Doug wants to open a nationwide chain of bars called Cocktails & Dreams. Brian drops out of business school, and the two become popular bartenders at a trendy nightclub.

Their flairing act attracts Coral, a wealthy photographer, and she and Brian start dating. Doug bets Brian that the relationship will not last and, unbeknownst to the latter, seduces Coral. When Brian finds out, he and Doug dissolve their partnership.

Two years later, Brian is working at a beachside bar in Jamaica, hoping to save enough for his own establishment. He meets artist Jordan Mooney, and they begin a passionate relationship. Doug shows up, married to the wealthy, flirtatious, and much younger Kerry. Doug bets Brian that he cannot attract Bonnie, a wealthy older woman. Brian accepts his challenge and wins Bonnie over. Jordan sees them going to the motel together. The next morning, Brian regrets the fling and seeks out Jordan but she has returned to the United States.

Brian returns to New York with Bonnie, hoping her influence will help him land a corporate job. He soon feels marginalized and resents her lifestyle. While attending an art exhibit, Brian has an altercation with the artist in front of Bonnie's friends, ending their relationship.

Brian tries to reconcile with Jordan, who angrily refuses. She reveals she is pregnant and does not want him in her life, then moves into her parents’ upscale Park Avenue apartment. Jordan's father, Richard, tries to pay Brian off, but he refuses. Jordan explains that she concealed her family's wealth because she wanted him to love her for herself. To prove he cares little about money, he tears up her father's bribe check and leaves.

Brian finds Doug on his yacht and believes he has finally achieved the financial success they both sought. However, Doug reveals that when his business began to fail, he invested Kerry's money in commodities and lost her entire wealth.

Brian takes Kerry back to her apartment. She reveals being bored with marriage and tries to seduce him, but Brian rebuffs her. He returns to Doug's boat and finds he committed suicide. Kerry later sends Brian a letter that Doug left him, explaining that his life was a fraud.

Hoping to win Jordan back, Brian goes to her home, overcoming the security to reach her. He wants to avoid making the same mistake as Doug by being too proud to ask for help. His uncle Pat has given him a loan to start his own bar. Jordan agrees to take him back, but Richard interferes, leading to a scuffle with a security guard. As they leave, Richard says they are on their own.

Brian and Jordan marry. Brian opens his own bar called Flanagan's Cocktails & Dreams. At the grand opening, Jordan whispers that she is expecting twins. To celebrate, and to Pat's dismay, Brian proclaims that drinks are on the house.

== Cast ==
- Tom Cruise as Brian Flanagan
- Bryan Brown as Doug Coughlin
- Elisabeth Shue as Jordan Mooney
- Lisa Banes as Bonnie
- Laurence Luckinbill as Richard Mooney
- Kelly Lynch as Kerry Coughlin
- Gina Gershon as Coral
- Robert Donley as Eddie
- Ron Dean as Uncle Pat
- Ellen Foley as Eleanor
- Gerry Bamman as Tourist
- Larry Block as Bar Owner
- Paul Benedict as Finance Teacher
- Kenneth John McGregor as Sculptor
- David L. Crowley as Doorman

== Production ==
=== Script ===
The film was based on Heywood Gould's semi-autobiographical novel published in 1984. Gould had worked as a bartender in New York from 1969 to 1981 to support his writing career. Gould said he "met a lot of interesting people behind the bar and very rarely was it someone who started out wanting to be a bartender. They all had ambitions, some smoldering and some completely forgotten or suppressed."

Gould says the lead character Brian Flanagan "is a composite of a lot of people I met, including myself in those days. I was in my late 30s, and I was drinking pretty good, and I was starting to feel like I was missing the boat. The character in the book is an older guy who has been around and starting to feel that he's pretty washed-up."

Universal bought the film rights and Gould wrote the script, changing it from his novel. He says the studio put the project in turnaround "because I wasn't making the character likable enough." Disney picked up the project "and I went through the same process with them. I would fight them at every turn, and there was a huge battle over making the lead younger, which I eventually did."

Gould later admitted that the people who wanted him to make changes "were correct. They wanted movie characters. Characters who were upbeat and who were going to have a happy ending and a possible future in their lives. That's what you want for a big commercial Hollywood movie. So I tried to walk that thin line between giving them what they wanted and not completely betraying the whole arena of saloons in general."

=== Casting ===
Tom Cruise expressed interest in playing the role of Brian Flanagan, which helped get it financed. Rob Lowe also auditioned for the role of Brian. "There were a lot of bartenders around like Tom Cruise, younger guys who came on and were doing this for a while—and then 10 years later, still doing it," said Gould. "It wasn't as if I was betraying the character. It was a matter of making the character more idealistic, more hopeful—he's got his life ahead of him. He turns on the charm, without the cynical bitter edge of the older guys."

Bryan Brown was cast on the strength of his performance in F/X. Brown later said the original script "was one of the very best screenplays I had ever read. Very dark... about the cult of celebrity and everything about it.... Tom Cruise is a very sweet man, he was then and still is. But when Tom came in, the movie had to change. The studio made the changes to protect the star and it became a much slighter movie because of it."

=== Production ===
Gould says the tricks involving throwing bottles was not in the book, but something he showed Cruise and Brown. They used it and it became a prominent feature of the film. During the love scene between Coral and Brian, when Cruise grabbed Gina Gershon's stomach, she accidentally struck him in the nose with her knee.

The film used various locations along the North Shore of Jamaica, featuring such real-life locations as the Jamaica Inn, Dunn's River Falls, Dragon Bay Beach and the Sandals Royal Plantation.

=== Post-production ===
A music score was originally done by Maurice Jarre. A new score was added at the last minute.

Kelly Lynch later said the film "was actually a really complicated story about the '80s and power and money, and it was really re-edited where they completely lost my character's backstory—her low self-esteem, who her father was, why she was this person that she was—but it was obviously a really successful movie, if not as good as it could've been." She claimed Disney reshot "about a third of the film... and turned it into flipping the bottles and this and that.... But we had a really great time. And Tom was so much fun, just a ball to work with, both on and off camera."

== Reception ==
=== Box office ===
Cocktail grossed $78.2 million in the United States and Canada, and $93.3 million in other territories, for a worldwide total of $171.5 million, ranking as the eighth highest-grossing film of 1988 worldwide.

=== Critical response ===
On the review aggregator website Rotten Tomatoes, 11% of 46 critics' reviews are positive, with an average rating of 4.4/10. The website's consensus reads: "There are no surprises in Cocktail, a shallow, dramatically inert romance that squanders Tom Cruise's talents in what amounts to a naive barkeep's banal fantasy." Metacritic, which uses a weighted average, assigned the film a score of 12 out of 100, based on 14 critics, indicating "overwhelming dislike". Audiences polled by CinemaScore gave the film an average grade of "B+" on an A+ to F scale.

Vincent Canby of The New York Times gave a negative review, calling it "an upscale, utterly brainless variation on those efficient old B-movies of the 1930s and 40s about the lives, loves and skills of coal miners, sand hogs, and telephone linemen, among others."

Roger Ebert of the Chicago Sun-Times was also critical, explaining that "the more you think about what really happens in Cocktail, the more you realize how empty and fabricated it really is." On their television show, Ebert's colleague Gene Siskel considered the love story "totally ridiculous" and wished that the film would have instead centered on the master and apprentice relationship between Doug Coughlin (Brown) and Flanagan. Both critics put the film on their top ten "Worst Films of 1988" lists.

"I was not happy with the final product," said Gould. "It got so savaged by the critics ... I was accused of betraying my own work, which is stupid. So I was pretty devastated. I literally couldn't get out of bed for a day. The good thing about that experience is that it toughened me up." In 1992, Cruise said the film "was not a crowning jewel" in his career.

The official soundtrack single, The Beach Boys' "Kokomo", was commercially successful and topped the charts in the United States, Australia and Japan. The song was nominated for a Grammy Award for Best Song Written Specifically for a Motion Picture or for Television at the 31st Annual Grammy Awards and a Golden Globe Award for Best Original Song at the 46th Golden Globe Awards.

=== Accolades ===
Cocktail won two Golden Raspberry Awards for Worst Picture and Worst Screenplay while Cruise was nominated as Worst Actor and Roger Donaldson as Worst Director at the 9th Golden Raspberry Awards. The film is listed in Golden Raspberry Award founder John Wilson's book The Official Razzie Movie Guide as one of "The 100 Most Enjoyably Bad Movies Ever Made". The film was also nominated for Worst Picture at the 1988 Stinkers Bad Movie Awards but lost to Caddyshack II.

Additionally, Cruise's other film in 1988 was his co-starring role in the Academy Award for Best Picture-winning film Rain Man, alongside Dustin Hoffman. In doing so, he became the first (and as of 2026, only) actor to star in a Worst Picture Razzie winner and Best Picture Oscar winner in the same year.

== Soundtrack ==
Cocktail (Original Motion Picture Soundtrack)

Soundtrack album by various artists
- Released: August 2, 1988
- Genres: Pop; rock
- Length: 35:27
- Label: Elektra

Professional ratings
Review scores
Source	Rating
AllMusic	3/5 stars

Cocktail soundtrack
No.	Title	Artist	Length
1.	"Wild Again"	Starship	4:43
2.	"Powerful Stuff"	The Fabulous Thunderbirds	4:48
3.	"Since When"	Robbie Nevil	4:02
4.	"Don't Worry, Be Happy"	Bobby McFerrin	4:48
5.	"Hippy Hippy Shake"	The Georgia Satellites	1:45
6.	"Kokomo"	The Beach Boys	3:34
7.	"Rave On!"	John Cougar Mellencamp	3:13
8.	"All Shook Up"	Ry Cooder	3:29
9.	"Oh, I Love You So"	Preston Smith	2:42
10.	"Tutti Frutti"	Little Richard	2:23

Additional tracks featured in the film include:

- "Essential Sensual" – Wayne Roland Brown
- "Addicted to Love" – Robert Palmer
- "Shelter of Your Love" – Jimmy Cliff
- "This Magic Moment" – Leroy Gibbons
- "When Will I Be Loved" – The Everly Brothers (uncredited)
- "That Hypnotizin' Boogie" - David Wilcox

Song featured in the UK trailer:

- “You Move Me” - Rick Astley

=== Charts ===
1988–1989 weekly chart performance for Cocktail
Chart (1988–1989)	Peak position
Australian Albums (ARIA)	1
Austrian Albums (Ö3 Austria)	3
Canada Top Albums/CDs (RPM)	1
Dutch Albums (Album Top 100)	22
European Albums (Music & Media)	7
Finnish Albums (Suomen virallinen lista)	7
German Albums (Offizielle Top 100)	4
Icelandic Albums (Tónlist)	1
New Zealand Albums (RMNZ)	1
Swedish Albums (Sverigetopplistan)	3
Swiss Albums (Schweizer Hitparade)	4
US Billboard 200	2

2013 weekly chart performance for Cocktail
Chart (2013)	Peak position
UK Soundtrack Albums (Official Charts)	46

2016 weekly chart performance for Cocktail
Chart (2016)	Peak position
US Soundtrack Albums (Billboard)	13

1988 year-end chart performance for Cocktail
Chart (1988)	Position
Canada Top Albums/CDs (RPM)	12
US Billboard 200	74
US Soundtrack Albums (Billboard)	4

1989 year-end chart performance for Cocktail
Chart (1989)	Position
Australian Albums (ARIA)	19
Austrian Albums (Ö3 Austria)	26
Canada Top Albums/CDs (RPM)	31
European Albums (Music & Media)	56
German Albums (Offizielle Top 100)	70
New Zealand Albums (RMNZ)	20
Swiss Albums (Schweizer Hitparade)	27
US Billboard 200	32
US Soundtrack Albums (Billboard)	2

=== Certifications ===
Certifications for Cocktail
Region	Certification	Certified units/sales
Australia (ARIA)	4× Platinum	280,000^{^}
Canada (Music Canada)	Diamond	1,000,000^{^}
France (SNEP)	Gold	100,000^{*}
Hong Kong (IFPI Hong Kong)	Gold	10,000^{*}
New Zealand (RMNZ)	Platinum	15,000^{^}
Spain (Promusicae)	Gold	50,000^{^}
Sweden (GLF)	Gold	50,000^{^}
Switzerland (IFPI Switzerland)	Gold	25,000^{^}
United Kingdom (BPI)	Gold	100,000^{^}
United States (RIAA)	4× Platinum	4,000,000^{^}
^{*} Sales figures based on certification alone.^{^} Shipments figures based on certification alone.

Preceded by Leonard Part 6	Golden Raspberry Award for Worst Picture; 9th Golden Raspberry Awards	Succeeded by Star Trek V: The Final Frontier
