= Straight to the Sky =

Studio album by Lisa Lisa and Cult Jam
- Released: April 12, 1989
- Genre: R&B
- Length: 57:28
- Label: Columbia
- Producer: Full Force

Lisa Lisa and Cult Jam chronology
Spanish Fly (1987)	Straight to the Sky (1989)	Straight Outta Hell's Kitchen (1991)

Singles from Straight to the Sky
- 1. "Little Jackie Wants to Be a Star" Released: March 1989; 2. "Just Git It Together" Released: 1989; 3. "Kiss Your Tears Away" Released: 1990

Professional ratings
Review scores
Source	Rating
AllMusic	4/5 stars
Hi-Fi News & Record Review	B:3
Stereo Review	good

Straight to the Sky is a 1989 album by Lisa Lisa and Cult Jam. It is best known for the lead track "Little Jackie Wants to Be a Star", which reached number 29 on the US Billboard Hot 100. Two further singles were released from the album; "Just Git It Together" and "Kiss Your Tears Away".

== Track listing ==
All tracks are written by Full Force.

No.	Title	Length
1.	"Just Git It Together"	6:04
2.	"Little Jackie Wants to Be a Star"	4:50
3.	"Give Me Some of Your Time"	6:01
4.	"U Never Nu How Good U Had It" (with Full Force)	4:45
5.	"Kiss Your Tears Away"	4:41
6.	"Dance Forever"	4:27
7.	"Straight to the Sky"	4:59
8.	"Gotta Find Somebody New"	5:24
9.	"I Can't Take No More"	6:13
10.	"I Love What You Do to Me"	4:36
11.	"Talking Nonsense" (Part 2)	0:23
12.	"Star" (The Jackie Mix)	5:05

== Production ==
- Written, arranged and produced by Full Force
- Engineered by Scott Goofman, Tony Maserati and Vicki Nemarich

=== Weekly charts ===
Chart (1989)	Peak position
Canadian Albums (RPM)	63
US Billboard 200	77
US Top R&B/Hip-Hop Albums (Billboard)	18
