= LL77 =

Studio album by Lisa Lisa
- Released: January 18, 1994
- Recorded: 1993
- Genre: R&B
- Label: Pendulum/ERG
- Producers: Guru (track 1), Nona Hendryx (track 10; additional production on track 1), Rob Chastain (co-producer; track 2), Giovanni Salah (tracks 2–6), Junior Vasquez (tracks 7–9, 11 and 12)

Lisa Lisa chronology
| Straight Outta Hell's Kitchen (1991) | LL77 (1994) | Life 'n Love (2009) |

LL77 is the debut solo album by American singer Lisa Lisa, released in 1994.

== Production ==
The album was produced by Guru, Nona Hendryx, and Junior Vasquez, among others. It was Lisa's intention to move away from the Latin bubblegum style of her past as lead vocalist of the band Lisa Lisa and Cult Jam by crafting a harder-sounding record.

== Critical reception ==
Professional ratings
Review scores
| Source | Rating |
|---|---|
| AllMusic | 3/5 stars |
| Edmonton Journal | 2/4 stars |
| Entertainment Weekly | C |
| The Indianapolis Star | 2.5/4 stars |
| Music Week | 3/5 stars |
| Pittsburgh Post-Gazette | 1.5/4 stars |
| Rolling Stone | 3.5/5 stars |

Rolling Stone wrote that "the songs, along with dependably crunchy rhythms, give up nifty pop hooks." Entertainment Weekly called the album "all atmosphere and no guts," writing that "no matter how sultry the drumbeats, Lisa Lisa’s voice is too thin to provide much soul." The New York Times deemed it "brave, flawed and, at moments, brilliant."

== Track listing ==
| No. | Title | Writer(s) | Length |
|---|---|---|---|
| 1. | "Why Can't Lovers" | Nona Hendryx; Keith Elam | 5:20 |
| 2. | "I'm Open" | Giovanni Salah | 4:21 |
| 3. | "The Great Pretender" | Salah; Jill Jones | 4:37 |
| 4. | "Skip to My Lu" | Salah | 3:59 |
| 5. | "Covers" | Salah | 4:35 |
| 6. | "Mr. Jimmy" | Salah; Hendryx; Rob Chastain | 4:18 |
| 7. | "Knockin' Down the Walls" | Junior Vasquez; Hendryx; Merv Depeyer | 4:18 |
| 8. | "When I Fell in Love" | Vasquez; Lydia Rhodes; Joey Moskowitz | 5:26 |
| 9. | "Acid Rain" | Vasquez; Moskowitz; David Werner | 5:28 |
| 10. | "If This Is Real" | Hendryx; Elam | 5:06 |
| 11. | "Make It Right" | Vasquez; Rhodes; Tony Shimkin | 5:33 |
| 12. | "Same Old Thing" | Vasquez; Depeyer; Rhodes | 6:24 |

== Singles ==
| Year | Single | Chart | Position |
|---|---|---|---|
| 1994 | "Skip to My Lu" | US Hot R&B Singles | 38 |
| 1994 | "Skip to My Lu" | US Bubbling Under Hot 100 Singles | 5 |
| 1994 | "Skip to My Lu" | UK Singles Chart | 34 |
| 1994 | "When I Fell in Love" | US Hot R&B Singles | 96 |
| 1994 | "When I Fell in Love" | US Hot Dance Club Play | 28 |
