= Spanish Fly (album) =

Studio album by Lisa Lisa and Cult Jam
- Released: April 8, 1987
- Recorded: September 1986–March 1987
- Genres: Contemporary R&B, dance-pop, Latin freestyle
- Length: 42:43
- Label: Columbia
- Producer: Full Force

Lisa Lisa and Cult Jam chronology
Lisa Lisa & Cult Jam with Full Force (1985)	Spanish Fly (1987)	Straight to the Sky (1989)

Singles from Spanish Fly
- 1. "Head to Toe" Released: March 9, 1987; 2. "Lost in Emotion" Released: June 7, 1987; 3. "Someone to Love Me for Me" Released: September 28, 1987; 4. "Everything Will B-Fine" Released: January 27, 1988; 5. "I Promise You" Released: 1988

Spanish Fly is the second studio album by Lisa Lisa and Cult Jam. The album was released in April 8, 1987. The singles "Head to Toe" and "Lost in Emotion" both reached number one in the United States. The album peaked at No. 7 on the Billboard 200. It has sold more than a million copies.

== Production ==
The album was written and produced by Full Force.

== Critical reception ==
Professional ratings
Review scores
Source	Rating
AllMusic	4.5/5 stars
Robert Christgau	C+
The Encyclopedia of Popular Music	4/5 stars
Los Angeles Times	2/4 stars
Orlando Sentinel	4/5 stars
The Philadelphia Inquirer	3/4 stars
The Rolling Stone Album Guide	3/5 stars

People wrote that Lisa has "a rich, versatile sound and the vocal strength to penetrate the album’s percussion-heavy arrangements." The Globe and Mail thought that Lisa's "accounts of her various sex and dance urges are both funny and salacious." The Los Angeles Times called the album "an urban contemporary kitchen sink—everything is in there, from dance to doo-wop to crackling funk to spicy salsa." USA Today deemed Lisa "today's Ronnie Spector: a technically limited singer who succeeds by projecting a girlish attitude that's both vulnerable and indomitable."

== Track listing ==
All tracks are written by Full Force, with additional "Someone to Love Me for Me" writing by Lisa Lisa.

No.	Title	Length
1.	"Everything Will B-Fine"	5:11
2.	"Head to Toe"	5:03
3.	"A Face in the Crowd"	6:10
4.	"Someone to Love Me for Me"	4:51
5.	"Talking Nonsense"	1:08
6.	"I Promise You"	4:46
7.	"A Fool Is Born Everyday"	5:23
8.	"Lost in Emotion"	5:07
9.	"Playing with Fire"	5:04
10.	"Spoken Word"	0:24

== Charts ==
=== Weekly charts ===
Chart (1987)	Peak position
Canadian Albums (RPM)	18
US Billboard 200	7
US Top R&B/Hip-Hop Albums (Billboard)	7

=== Year-end charts ===
Chart (1987)	Position
US Billboard 200	42
US Top R&B/Hip-Hop Albums (Billboard)	31

Chart (1988)	Position
US Top R&B/Hip-Hop Albums (Billboard)	67

== Certifications ==
Region	Certification	Certified units/sales
Canada (Music Canada)	Gold	50,000^{^}
United States (RIAA)	Platinum	1,000,000^{^}
^{^} Shipments figures based on certification alone.

== Personnel ==
- Lisa Lisa (Lisa Velez): Vocals
- Michael Hughes: Congas, timbales, talking
- Spanador: Guitars, bass, keyboards
- Full Force: Performer
- Arranged and produced by Full Force
- Engineered by Glenn Rosenstein
- Mixed by Full Force and Glenn Rosenstein
- Jurgen S. Korduletsch, Don Orilo, Steve Salem: Executive producers
