= Someone to Love Me for Me =

Single by Lisa Lisa and Cult Jam

from the album Spanish Fly
- Released: 1987
- Genre: Pop
- Label: Columbia
- Songwriters: Curt Bedeau, Gerry Charles, Hugh L Clarke, Brian George, Lucien George, Paul George, Lisa Velez
- Producer: Full Force

Lisa Lisa and Cult Jam singles chronology
"Lost in Emotion" (1987)	"Someone to Love Me for Me" (1987)	"Everything Will B-Fine" (1988)

"Someone to Love Me for Me" is a song recorded by Lisa Lisa and Cult Jam and Full Force that appeared on their 1987 album Spanish Fly. The song hit number 78 on the Billboard Hot 100 chart and number 7 on the R&B chart in December 1987.

== Charts ==
Chart	Peak position
U.S. Billboard Hot 100	78
U.S. Billboard Hot Black Singles	7
U.S. Billboard Adult Contemporary	15
