= Go for Yours =

Single by Lisa Lisa and Cult Jam

from the album Caddyshack II soundtrack
- Released: 1988
- Genre: R&B
- Label: Columbia
- Songwriter(s): Full Force
- Producer(s): Full Force

Lisa Lisa and Cult Jam singles chronology
"Everything Will B-Fine" (1988)	"Go for Yours" (1988)	"Little Jackie Wants to Be a Star" (1989)

"Go for Yours" is a song recorded by Lisa Lisa and Cult Jam that appeared on the 1988 soundtrack to the film, Caddyshack II. As a single, it reached number 19 on the Billboard R&B singles chart in 1988. In 1990, this song was later covered by Deedee Magno Hall on an episode of The Mickey Mouse Club.

== Charts ==
Chart (1988)	Peak position
U.S. Billboard Hot R&B/Hip-Hop Songs	19
