= Caddyshack II =

1988 film by Allan Arkush

- Theatrical release poster by Carl Ramsey
- Directed by: Allan Arkush
- Written by: Harold Ramis; PJ Torokvei
- Based on: Characters by: Brian Doyle-Murray; Harold Ramis; Douglas Kenney
- Produced by: Neil Canton; Peter Guber; Jon Peters
- Starring: Jackie Mason; Robert Stack; Dyan Cannon; Dina Merrill; Jonathan Silverman; Brian McNamara; Marsha Warfield; Paul Bartel; Randy Quaid; Chevy Chase; Dan Aykroyd
- Cinematography: Harry Stradling Jr.
- Edited by: Bernard Gribble
- Music by: Ira Newborn
- Production company: The Guber-Peters Company
- Distributed by: Warner Bros.
- Release date: July 22, 1988
- Running time: 98 minutes
- Country: United States
- Language: English
- Budget: $20 million
- Box office: $11.8 million

Caddyshack II is a 1988 American sports comedy film and a sequel to the 1980 film Caddyshack. Directed by Allan Arkush and written by Harold Ramis (who co-wrote and directed the original Caddyshack) and PJ Torokvei, it stars Jackie Mason, Robert Stack, Dyan Cannon, Dina Merrill, Jonathan Silverman, Brian McNamara, Marsha Warfield, Paul Bartel and Randy Quaid with special appearances by Chevy Chase and Dan Aykroyd. It tells the story of wealthy and widowed real estate developer Jack Hartounian who goes up against Bushwood Country Club's snobbish president Chandler Young in a golfing tournament.

While the writing of the film is officially credited to Ramis and Torokvei, the first-draft script by Ramis and Torokvei was rewritten by other uncredited writers.

Caddyshack II was released by Warner Bros. on July 22, 1988. The sequel was panned by critics and is considered one of the worst sequels of all time. However, Kenny Loggins' "Nobody's Fool" which was used as the film's theme song was a chart success where it hit #8 on the Billboard Hot 100.

== Plot ==
Kate Hartounian is the teenage daughter of Jack, a wealthy and widowed real estate developer of Armenian and Jewish descent who made his fortune from humble means and in spite of his wealth, is kind to his employees and pays them well. Eager to improve her social status, Kate befriends the snobbish WASP Miffy Young, who encourages Kate and the rough but charming Jack to join their country club Bushwood, where the gopher still dwells.

When the elitist, old money members of Bushwood meet self-made, nouveau riche millionaire Jack, who builds low-income housing in upscale neighborhoods and displays many working class traits, his application to join is rejected. The only member of the club who takes a liking to the lewd, but well-meaning Jack is wealthy widow Elizabeth Pearce. Jack runs afoul of Bushwood's arrogant president Chandler Young who declares the Hartounians "are not Bushwood material." Chandler's equally haughty wife Cynthia tries to persuade Jack to build his housing complex away from her neighborhood after her son Todd failed to persuade Jack's lawyer Peter Blunt, leading Jack to chase her and the Pierponts with a bulldozer. In addition, Jack wins Chandler, Cynthia, Mr. Jamison and the Pierponts, in an auction that involves them working on his construction site. Jack's behavior upsets Kate, harming their relationship as she befriends a caddy named Harry.

In retaliation for being blacklisted by the club and Chandler having the construction site being shut down by establishing a Historical Preservation Society, Jack turns to his friend Ty Webb who owns the majority share of Bushwood, but otherwise stays out of the club's day-to-day operations. Jack buys Ty's stock in the club - making himself majority owner - and turns Bushwood into a gaudy amusement park called Jackie's Wacky Golf, angering Chandler and the other club members when they lose at each hole against Peter. Chandler hires a mercenary named Captain Tom Everett to kill Jack. Kate moves in with Miffy after a heated argument with Jack.

Chandler and Todd threaten Blunt with endless legal motions and filings intended to financially bankrupt Jack. Ty Webb suggests that the dispute between Jack and Chandler be resolved by the two men facing each other in a golf match. If Chandler wins, Jack gives up his construction site and the country club. If Jack wins, he keeps Bushwood and the housing project. Chandler hedges his bet by expecting Everett to kill Jack. Everett botches the first attempt by accidentally blowing up Chandler's Rolls-Royce which he mistook for Jack's car.

On the day of the golf match, Ty enlists Harry to be Jack's caddie. Everett's mission is derailed by the antics of the gopher. Despite Jack's poor performance early in the match, he manages to tie the score before the final hole. While playing the hole, Jack is faced with a 50-foot putt while Chandler faces a simple two-foot putt. Employing advice given to him by Webb before the match, Jack manages to sink the nearly impossible putt. Chandler needs to sink the easy two-foot putt to tie the match.

Meanwhile, Everett accidentally shoots himself in the buttocks with a poison dart. Kate commiserates with Miffy who suggests that she change her last name from Hartounian to Hart. Although she is embarrassed by her father's actions, Kate is still loyal to Jack and is offended at the thought of changing her family name. Kate attacks Miffy and reconciles with her father during the final hole. Everett fails to eliminate Jack as the gopher steals an explosive golf ball from him. The gopher quietly replaces Chandler's ball with the explosive ball. As Chandler putts the ball, it bursts in front of the Young family and Jack wins the match.

Ty encounters Everett who asks him for help removing a poisoned arrow and sucking out the poison. Peter mocks Chandler and Miffy argues with Cynthia over marrying Chandler while Todd falls unconscious. Jack asks Elizabeth out on a date and she accepts. The gopher pops out of the hole during the celebration and pursues a poodle.

== Cast ==
- Jackie Mason as Jack Hartounian, a wealthy and widowed real estate developer who becomes involved in Bushwood Country Club.
- Robert Stack as Chandler Young, the conservative President of Bushwood Country Club.
- Dyan Cannon as Elizabeth Pearce, a wealthy widow that befriends Jack.
- Dina Merrill as Cynthia Young, the snooty wife of Chandler Young.
- Jonathan Silverman as Harry, a caddy at Bushwood Country Club.
- Brian McNamara as Todd Young, an arrogant Harvard Law School graduate who is the son of Chandler and Cynthia Young.
- Marsha Warfield as Royette Tyler, a construction forewoman that oversees Jack's construction.
- Paul Bartel as Mr. Jamison, a member of Bushwood Country Club and the "society slave" auctioneer.
- Randy Quaid as Peter Blunt, Jack's lawyer who can get temperamental at times.
- Chevy Chase as Ty Webb, the son of one of Bushwood Country Club's founders who is a friend of Jack.
- Dan Aykroyd as Captain Tom Everett, a mercenary, survivalist, and retired United States Marine Corps veteran operating out a food truck who is hired by Chandler to dispose of Jack and runs afoul of the Gopher.
- Jessica Lundy as Kate Hartounian, the daughter of Jack Hartounian.
- Chynna Phillips as Mary Frances "Miffy" Young, a snobbish WASP who is the daughter of Chandler and Cynthia Young.
- Anthony Mockus Sr. as Mr. Pierpont, the Young family's lawyer and a member of Bushwood Country Club.
- Bibi Osterwald as Mrs. Pierpont, the wife of Mr. Pierpont.
- Pepe Serna as Carlos, a Spanish construction worker.
- Frank Welker as the voice of the Gopher

Construction workers portrayed by Andre Rosey Brown, Dennis Bowen, Gary Carlos Cervantes, Kenny D'Aquila, and Mark Christopher Lawrence.

== Production ==
The original Caddyshack was a box-office success, making $60 million worldwide on a budget of $4.8 million. Warner Bros. therefore set about to make a sequel. As originally planned, Caddyshack II would have reunited Rodney Dangerfield (one of the stars of the original Caddyshack) with the director Alan Metter, who had worked with Dangerfield in the comedy film Back to School (1986). Dangerfield, who made $35,000 for Caddyshack, asked for $7 million – of which $5 million was to be paid in advance – to reprise his Al Czervic role in Caddyshack II. Needing a big comedy for the summer of 1988, Warner Bros. agreed to Dangerfield's demands and paid Chevy Chase a seven-figure sum to reprise his role of Ty Webb from the original Caddyshack (albeit via a glorified cameo).

Jon Peters, executive producer of Caddyshack, would produce the sequel with Peter Guber and Neil Canton. The studio invited Caddyshack director Harold Ramis, who co-wrote that film with Brian Doyle-Murray and Douglas Kenney, to write the sequel. (Neither Doyle-Murray nor Kenney were involved in the sequel; Caddyshack producer/co-writer Kenney died in August 1980, a month after that film's release.)

Ramis later described Caddyshack II, which he co-wrote with his Second City Television colleague PJ Torokvei, as "terrible." In an interview with The A.V. Club in 1999, Ramis said that:

...with Caddyshack II, the studio begged me. They said, "Hey, we've got a great idea: 'The Shack is Back!'" And I said "No, I don't think so." But they said that Rodney really wanted to do it, and we could build it around Rodney. Rodney said, "Come on, do it." Then the classic argument came up which says that if you don't do it, someone will, and it will be really bad. So I worked on a script with my partner Peter Torokvei, consulting with Rodney all the time. Then Rodney got into a fight with the studio and backed out. We had some success with Back to School, which I produced and wrote, and we were working with the same director, Alan Metter. When Rodney pulled out, I pulled out, and then they fired Alan and got someone else. I got a call from [co-producer] Jon Peters saying, "Come with us to New York; we're going to see Jackie Mason!" I said, "Ooh, don't do this. Why don't we let it die?" And he said, "No, it'll be great." But I didn't go, and they got other writers to finish it. I tried to take my name off that one, but they said if I took my name off, it would come out in the trades and I would hurt the film."

Ramis was later quoted as saying that Dangerfield was the only one who expressed an interest in doing a sequel in the first place. Ted Knight had died two years earlier, Bill Murray was not interested in reprising his role as Carl Spackler the greenskeeper, and he said Chase had "already moved on", although Chase did eventually agree to appear.

Ramis worked on the first draft of Caddyshack II in the summer of 1987 with Torokvei. Dangerfield did not like the script and requested rewrites. Growing disillusioned with the project, Dangerfield reportedly tried to force Warner Bros. to release him from his contract by demanding additional royalties and final-cut rights. In October 1987, less than a month before Caddyshack II was scheduled to begin filming and with $2 million already spent by the studio on pre-production, Dangerfield dropped out of the project because he felt it would not be successful. Warner Bros. sued Dangerfield for breach of contract. Early in the hearings, the studio settled with Dangerfield for an undisclosed amount.

The project was put on hold while Warner Bros. looked for a new director, eventually landing upon Allan Arkush. A former protégé of Roger Corman and collaborator with Joe Dante, Arkush directed several motion pictures (including the 1979 cult hit Rock 'n' Roll High School) before becoming a prolific director of episodic television, with credits including L.A. Law, St. Elsewhere and Moonlighting. Arkush was keen to get back into directing films, later recalling, "I had a really successful run on television. Moonlighting was a big deal, I was doing L.A. Law, working on pilots and I had a deal with Warner Bros. to direct and they said, “Well, there’s another National Lampoon movie.” National Lampoon Goes to College and I thought, “That sounds like a good idea.” They couldn't get it bought. So they asked, “How would you like to make Caddyshack II?”

After the offer was made, Arkush rented and watched the original Caddyshack and signed on to direct the sequel. He was not aware at the time of the litigation between the studio and Dangerfield. It was only after agreeing to direct Caddyshack II that Arkush realized how much trouble the project was in: production began in late 1987 and Warner Bros. still insisted upon a summer 1988 release, meaning only half a year for principal photography and post-production. Adding to this difficulty was the fact that the project was nowhere near ready to begin filming. Arkush later claimed, “The more I got into it, the more I realized that they didn’t have a script that was in any kind of shape, they didn’t have Bill Murray and now they didn’t have Rodney Dangerfield.” Arkush likened his assignment “to hopping onto a moving ship barreling full steam ahead.”

Screenwriters Jeffrey Price and Peter S. Seaman, who scripted Who Framed Roger Rabbit (1988), were brought in to overhaul Ramis and Torokvei's script (although they would ultimately receive no official credit for doing so). With Dangerfield out of the picture, the screenplay replaced Al Czervic with Jack Hartounian, a new character to be played by Jackie Mason - like Dangerfield, a Jewish-American Borscht Belt stand-up comedian. After witnessing Mason's one-man comedy act on Broadway at the insistence of producer Jon Peters, Arkush was concerned about the comedian's suitability for the film: “The thing that occurred to me was that [Mason] didn’t connect with the audience in any sort of personal way. That’s not necessarily a good thing for someone who’s supposed to be your lead. At least when Rodney says, ‘I get no respect,’ there's an empathy that he evokes from the audience.” Arkush also stated, "[Mason] is a very funny joke machine and you laugh yourself silly. I needed a comedian who was equally an actor. I went to the producer Jon Peters and told him my fears. He was so convinced that Jackie was a brilliant comedian and could pull it off. Jon looked me in the eye and said, “Don’t turn a Go picture into a development deal.” I should have walked away."

Mason's casting in Caddyshack II was publicly announced by Daily Variety on November 17, 1987. Of his role as Jack Hartounian, Mason said, "What I like about [him] is that he's more concerned with the way people treat each other than whether they use the right words in polite society or raise the proper finger to drink a glass of beer." Mason's character in Caddyshack II has the same surname as the character Mason played in The Jerk (1979), Harry Hartounian.

Chase was the only cast member from the original Caddyshack to reprise his role (and would publicly announce later that he regretted doing so). Murray refused to reprise his Carl Spackler role, opting to make Scrooged (1988) instead. Murray's Saturday Night Live colleague and Ghostbusters co-star Dan Aykroyd signed on in Murray's place, portraying Captain Tom Everett, a mercenary/survivalist hired by Chandler Young (Robert Stack) to kill Jack. Although playing new characters in the sequel, Mason, Stack, Aykroyd and Jonathan Silverman play roles that are analogous to those played by Dangerfield, Knight, Murray and Michael O'Keefe in the first film. Sam Kinison, who had appeared alongside Dangerfield in Back to School, was originally intended for Randy Quaid's role Peter Blunt, but left the production when Dangerfield dropped out.

Caddyshack II began filming on January 18, 1988, at the Rolling Hills Country Club in Davie, Florida (where Caddyshack had been filmed just under a decade prior). Despite working on the set with a golf pro, Mason could not convincingly swing a golf club; he also had difficulty remembering his lines, had no chemistry with his onscreen love interest Elizabeth Pearce (played by Dyan Cannon) and continuous overindulgence at the craft services table required the costume department to keep altering his wardrobe to accommodate his growing waistline. Aykroyd angered the producers by insisting on performing his character with a bizarre, grating, high-pitched voice (which Aykroyd claimed was based on the voice of Colonel Oliver North).

Arkush had a bad working relationship with Chase, who was paid a substantial fee for a relatively minimal role. Arkush later recalled, "It was a big paycheck, which Chevy talked about a lot... I went into this thinking that Chevy was committed to this character, but he wasn’t. On his first day, we were working out the blocking for his scene and I said, ‘How do you want to do this, Chevy?’ And he was just pissed at me and said, ‘Why? Don’t you have any ideas?!’” Arkush claimed that two days later, when filming Chase, Arkush offered suggestions to which Chase replied, “What? Don’t I get any input on this?!” Later, while watching one of his scenes during postproduction, Chase said to Arkush, “Call me when you’ve dubbed the laugh track,” before walking off in disgust.

Industrial Light and Magic supplied the visual effects for the scenes involving the animatronic gopher; vocal effects for the creature were provided by veteran voice-over artist Frank Welker.

== Music ==
The music score for Caddyshack II was provided by Ira Newborn. The film's theme song, "Nobody's Fool", was performed by Kenny Loggins, who provided original songs (including the hit song "I'm Alright") for the first Caddyshack soundtrack. Loggins had composed and recorded "I'm Alright" for the 1980 Caddyshack film, and was asked by film producer Jon Peters to write a theme song for the sequel. Initially, according to Loggins, "I wasn't so sure when he called about Caddyshack II. I was a little skittish about trusting lightning to strike twice in the same place." Co-written by Loggins and Michael Towers, "Nobody's Fool" was later included as the opening track of Loggins' album Back to Avalon (1988).

Other singles from the Caddyshack II soundtrack include "Power of Persuasion" by The Pointer Sisters; "Go for Yours", an R&B hit for Lisa Lisa and Cult Jam with Full Force and "Turn on (The Beat Box)" by Earth, Wind & Fire who performed "Boogie Wonderland" in the original 1980 Caddyshack film. The soundtrack was released on Columbia Records.

=== Track listing ===
No.	Title	Writer(s)	Producer(s)	Length
1.	"Nobody's Fool" (Kenny Loggins)	Kenny Loggins; Michael Towers	Dennis Lambert	4:17
2.	"I Run Right Back" (Patty Smyth)	Diane Warren	Ric Ocasek	4:04
3.	"Power of Persuasion" (The Pointer Sisters)	Warren	Jerry Knight; Aaron Zigman	3:39
4.	"Heart of Glass" (Tamara Champlin)	Tamara Champlin; Bill Champlin; Bruce Gaitsch	Jay Graydon	4:16
5.	"Turn on (The Beat Box)" (Earth, Wind & Fire)	Rhett Lawrence; Maurice White; Martin Page	Maurice White; Rhett Lawrence	4:41
6.	"Go for Yours" (Lisa Lisa and Cult Jam with Full Force)	Full Force	Full Force	4:36
7.	"Jack Fresh" (Full Force)	Full Force	Full Force	4:49
8.	"Money (That's What I Want)" (Cheap Trick)	Berry Gordy; Janie Bradford	Richie Zito	3:15
9.	"One Way Out" (Eric Martin)	Page; Clif Magness	Michael Dilbeck; Andy Johns	4:12
10.	"A Hole in One" (Ira Newborn)	Ira Newborn	Ira Newborn	4:15

== Reception ==
Caddyshack II was panned by critics and was a box-office bomb. On the review aggregator website Rotten Tomatoes, 4% of 24 critics' reviews are positive, with an average rating of 2.8/10. The website's consensus reads: "Handicapped by a family friendly PG rating, even the talents of Caddyshack II's all-star comic cast can't save it from its lazy, laughless script and uninspired direction." Metacritic, which uses a weighted average, assigned the film a score of 7 out of 100, based on 7 critics, indicating "overwhelming dislike". Audiences surveyed by CinemaScore gave the film a grade C+ on scale of A to F.

Rita Kempley of The Washington Post wrote: "Caddyshack II, a feeble follow-up to the 1980 laff riot, is lamer than a duck with bunions, and dumber than grubs. It's patronizing and clumsily manipulative, and top banana Jackie Mason is upstaged by the gopher puppet." Michael Wilmington of the Los Angeles Times said the film was so bad "it makes Caddyshack I look like Godfather II."

Caryn James of The New York Times ended her review of the film with the words, "If Mr. Mason hopes to make the kind of segue from stand-up comedy to movies that Mr. Dangerfield did, he and his advisers better think again. Caddyshack II is the kind of film that sends careers spiraling downward."

Dave Kehr of the Chicago Tribune wrote, "Caddyshack II raises the ghost of summer comedies past. It's shoddy, lazy and numbingly stupid," adding, "The comedy is mostly a matter of flatulent animals and falls into swimming pools, and director Allan Arkush (of the engaging Rock 'n' Roll High School) executes it with an uncharacteristic clumsiness... Given the name heavy cast – Randy Quaid, Chevy Chase, and Dan Aykroyd make appearances – it means something that the most fully developed character in the film is a hand puppet gopher."

The film received four Golden Raspberry Award nominations; it won two. It was nominated for Worst Picture and Worst Actor (Mason) and won for Worst Supporting Actor (Aykroyd) and Worst Original Song ("Jack Fresh") at the 9th Golden Raspberry Awards. It also won Worst Picture at the 1988 Stinkers Bad Movie Awards.

Harold Ramis recalled, "[PJ] Torokvei and I went to one of the first research screenings in Pasadena, and we literally crawled out of the theater because we didn't want anyone to see us." Mark Canton, Warner Bros.' head of production at the time Caddyshack II was made, said in 2010, "It was troubled from the beginning because Rodney didn't do it. No offense to Jackie Mason, but it just didn’t work. It was well-intentioned and it was a good business move, but it just wasn’t the same."

On the subject of Caddyshack II, Bill Murray remarked, "You know, Caddyshack was a great thing. There were some extraordinary people in it, Ted Knight, Rodney Dangerfield, the guy who played the bishop, these are people who have passed away. They were great people, great actors and lots of fun, and it was an unusual thing. Can't you be happy with having seen it and watched it? You want it again?"

In his book My Year of Chevy: One Man's Journey Through the Filmography of Chevy Chase (2013), film critic Mike McGranaghan wrote:

For a few years following its release, I actually kind of liked Caddyshack II. Not in a traditional way, mind you. This is a very bad picture, yet I was fascinated by its utter refusal to deviate from the formula. They theoretically could have gone a hundred different ways or told a brand new story about life at Bushwood, but they didn't. They doggedly held firm to the belief that by simply replicating as many elements from the original as closely as possible, they'd strike comedic gold a second time... My justification for liking Caddyshack II was that it's ultimately a movie about its own failed attempt at a franchise. It is an example of people desperately trying to catch lightning in a bottle twice. For me, that made some of the scenes humorous at the time. I didn't laugh because the comedy was of good quality...I laughed because the intention to duplicate the formula was so blatant that it became sublimely absurd... Any humor [Caddyshack II] contains comes not from the material but from the failed attempt at pulling the material off. I thought that, while it didn't work at the intended level, it did work on a whole other, unintended level. Watching it again 20 years later, I no longer find it to be amusing on any level... Ramis' original [Caddyshack] had, at its core, a number of personal anecdotes about life as a teenage caddy that made it more relatable. The sequel is just forced. It completely loses the anarchic spirit of the first one. It has slobs and snobs but not the underlying heart. The comedy is far too over-the-top, and the message about elitism is so overt that the comedy is suffocated... Ty Webb's famous "be the ball" advice was all about following one's instincts to achieve success. Caddyshack knew how to be the ball, and ended up a comedic hole in one. Caddyshack II sliced into the woods.

Allan Arkush regretted directing Caddyshack II, the experience of which he claimed sent him to therapy. He later said, "You should never make a movie for the wrong reasons. You should only make movies about something where you know no one else can make it better than you... It was my own fault. Everyone who worked on it worked hard and the writers were good. It was great to work with Danny Aykroyd."

Awards
Preceded by Spaceballs	Stinker Award for Worst Picture; 1988 Stinkers Bad Movie Awards	Succeeded by Harlem Nights
