= Can You Feel the Beat =

Single by Lisa Lisa and Cult Jam

from the album Lisa Lisa & Cult Jam with Full Force
- Released: October 1985
- Recorded: 1985
- Genre: Freestyle
- Label: Columbia
- Songwriter(s): Full Force
- Producer(s): Full Force

Lisa Lisa and Cult Jam singles chronology
"I Wonder If I Take You Home" (1985)	"Can You Feel the Beat" (1985)	"All Cried Out" (1986)

"Can You Feel the Beat" is a song recorded by Lisa Lisa and Cult Jam and Full Force from their 1985 album Lisa Lisa & Cult Jam with Full Force. The song hit number 69 on the Billboard Hot 100 and number 40 on the R&B singles chart in December 1985. It achieved its biggest success on the Billboard Dance chart, where it peaked at number six.

The hip-hop duo Nina Sky interpolated the song in the bridge of their 2004 hit single "Move Ya Body".

== Charts ==
Chart (1985)	Peak position
U.S. Billboard Hot 100	69
U.S. Billboard Hot Black Singles	40
U.S. Billboard Hot Dance Music/Maxi-Singles Sales	9
U.S. Billboard Hot Dance Club Play	6
UK Singles Chart	97
