= 1988 Stinkers Bad Movie Awards =

11th Award ceremony by the Stinkers Bad Movie Awards

The 11th Stinkers Bad Movie Awards were released by the Hastings Bad Cinema Society in 1989 to honour the worst films the film industry had to offer in 1988. As follows, there was only a Worst Picture category with provided commentary for each nominee, as well as a list of films that were also considered for the final list but ultimately failed to make the cut (18 films total).

== Worst Picture Ballot ==
Film	Production company(s)
Caddyshack II	Warner Bros.
Cocktail	Touchstone Pictures
Elvira, Mistress of the Dark	New World Pictures
The New Adventures of Pippi Longstocking	Columbia Pictures
The Telephone	New World Pictures

=== Dishonourable Mentions ===
- Arthur 2: On the Rocks (Warner Bros.)
- Beaches (Touchstone)
- Big Business (Touchstone)
- Big Top Pee-wee (Paramount)
- Ernest Saves Christmas (Touchstone)
- Funny Farm (Warner Bros.)
- Hot to Trot (Warner Bros.)
- Howling IV: The Original Nightmare (Artisan)
- Johnny Be Good (Orion)
- The Last Temptation of Christ (Universal)
- Mac and Me (Orion)
- Police Academy 5: Assignment Miami Beach (Warner Bros.)
- Rambo III (TriStar)
- Rent-A-Cop (Kings Road)
- Salsa (Cannon)
- Short Circuit 2 (TriStar)
- Sunset (TriStar)
- Vibes (Columbia)

== See also ==
- 9th Golden Raspberry Awards
