= Lisa Lisa & Cult Jam with Full Force =

Studio album by Lisa Lisa & Cult Jam
- Released: August 2, 1985
- Recorded: August 1984 – February 1985
- Genre: Dance-pop, freestyle, contemporary R&B
- Length: 42:08
- Label: Columbia
- Producer: Full Force

Lisa Lisa & Cult Jam chronology
| Lisa Lisa & Cult Jam with Full Force (1985) | Spanish Fly (1987) |

Singles from Lisa Lisa & Cult Jam with Full Force
- 1. "I Wonder If I Take You Home" Released: May 10, 1985; 2. "Can You Feel the Beat" Released: May 18, 1985; 3. "All Cried Out" Released: February 18, 1986

Lisa Lisa & Cult Jam with Full Force is the debut album of Lisa Lisa & Cult Jam in collaboration with the band and production team, Full Force, released on Columbia Records on August 2, 1985. It is best known for the lead tracks, "I Wonder If I Take You Home", "Can You Feel the Beat" and "All Cried Out". The third of these hits also features Full Force's Paul Anthony and Bowlegged Lou on vocals.

== Critical reception ==
In a contemporary review for The Village Voice, music critic Robert Christgau gave the album a "C+" and found Lisa Lisa's singing amateurish and comparable to "a Rosie & the Originals for our more pretentious time." In a retrospective review, AllMusic's Ron Wynn wrote that, along with her singing's "perfect mix of uncertainty, irony, and edge," the album is highlighted by "I Wonder If I Take You Home" and "All Cried Out", which he said is "arguably still her finest performance."

== Track listing ==
All tracks are written by Full Force, except where noted.

Side One
| No. | Title | Length |
|---|---|---|
| 1. | "I Wonder If I Take You Home" | 6:45 |
| 2. | "You'll Never Change" | 5:26 |
| 3. | "All Cried Out" | 4:49 |
| 4. | "This Is Cult Jam" (Cult Jam, Full Force, Howie Tee) | 4:38 |

Side Two
| No. | Title | Length |
|---|---|---|
| 5. | "Can You Feel the Beat" | 6:50 |
| 6. | "Behind My Eyes" | 5:53 |
| 7. | "Private Property" (Kangol Kid, Full Force) | 5:38 |
| 8. | "Take Me Home (Rap)" | 2:09 |

2012 remastered reissue bonus tracks
| No. | Title | Length |
|---|---|---|
| 9. | "I Wonder If I Take You Home" (12" Full Force Remix) | 6:55 |
| 10. | "Can You Feel the Beat" (12" Full Force Remix) | 5:31 |
| 11. | "I Wonder If I Take You Home" (Shep Pettibone Remix) | 6:23 |
| 12. | "Beat the Feel You Can" (12" Dub Remix) | 6:12 |
| 13. | "If I Take You Home" (Cult Jam Dub Edit) | 6:40 |

== Charts ==
| Chart (1985) | Peak position |
|---|---|
| US Billboard 200 | 52 |
| US Top R&B Albums | 16 |
| UK Albums Chart | 96 |

| Year | Single | Chart | Position |
|---|---|---|---|
| 1985 | "Can You Feel the Beat" | US Hot Dance Club Play | 6 |

== Personnel ==
=== Lisa Lisa & Cult Jam ===
- Lisa Lisa: Lead and backing vocals
- Alex "Spanador" Moseley: Guitars, bass, keyboards
- Mike Hughes: Timbales, percussion, rap

=== Full Force ===
- Paul "Anthony" George: Vocals
- Lucien "Bow-Legged Lou" George Jr.: Vocals
- Curt "Curt-T-T" Bedeau: Guitars
- Gerry "Baby Gee" Charles: Keyboards
- Junior "Shy Shy" Clark: Bass
- Brian "B-Fine" George: Drums, percussion, drum programming
