= Everything Will B-Fine =

Single by Lisa Lisa and Cult Jam

from the album Spanish Fly
- Released: January 27, 1988
- Genre: Pop, R&B
- Label: Columbia
- Songwriter(s): Curt Bedeau, Gerry Charles, Hugh L Clarke, Brian George, Lucien George, Paul George
- Producer(s): Full Force

Lisa Lisa and Cult Jam singles chronology
"Someone to Love Me for Me" (1987)	"Everything Will B-Fine" (1988)	"Go for Yours" (1988)

"Everything Will B-Fine" is a song recorded by Lisa Lisa and Cult Jam from their 1987 album Spanish Fly. The song hit number nine on the Billboard R&B Singles chart and number twenty-two on the Dance chart. The song was their first not to chart on the Billboard Hot 100.

== Charts ==
Chart (1988)	Peak position
U.S. Billboard Hot Black Singles	9
U.S. Billboard Hot Dance Music/Maxi-Singles Sales	19
U.S. Billboard Hot Dance Club Play	22
