= Just Git It Together =

Single by Lisa Lisa and Cult Jam

from the album Straight to the Sky
- Released: 1989
- Genre: Pop, R&B
- Label: Columbia
- Songwriter(s): Full Force
- Producer(s): Full Force

Lisa Lisa and Cult Jam singles chronology
"Little Jackie Wants to Be a Star" (1989)	"Just Git It Together" (1989)	"Kiss Your Tears Away" (1989)

"Just Git It Together" is a song recorded by Lisa Lisa and Cult Jam from their 1989 album Straight to the Sky featuring Ex Girlfriend on background vocals. It reached number sixteen on the Billboard R&B singles chart and number seven on the Dance chart.

== Charts ==
Chart (1989)	Peak position
U.S. Billboard Hot Black Singles	16
U.S. Billboard Hot Dance Music/Maxi-Singles Sales	10
U.S. Billboard Hot Dance Club Play	7
