= Preston Smith (musician) =

American singer-songwriter

Preston Smith is an American blues singer-songwriter from Houston, Texas, best known for his original song "Oh, I Love You So," which appeared on the soundtrack for the film Cocktail, starring Tom Cruise.
