= Stacy Francis =

American singer and actress

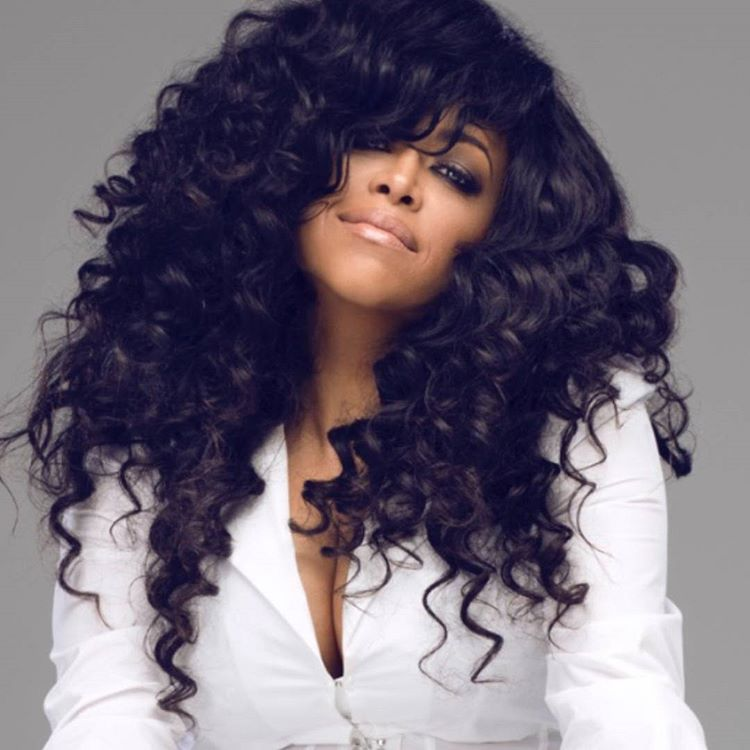

Background information
- Also known as: Stacy Francis-Madison
- Born: Stacy Francis
- Origin: Brooklyn, New York
- Genres: R&B, soul, gospel
- Occupations: Singer-songwriter, actress, keyboardist
- Instruments: Voice, keyboard
- Years active: 1989–present
- Labels: Reprise Records, Full Force
- Website: stacy-francis.com

Stacy Francis is an American singer and actress. She is best known for being a part of the girl group Ex Girlfriend and as a contestant in the first season of The X Factor USA. Francis has also made several television appearances on various shows. She also performed for Tom Cruise at his 40th birthday. Stacy participated in the nineteenth series of the UK television show Celebrity Big Brother as a "new star" housemate.

== Career ==
=== 1991–1994: Ex Girlfriend ===
In 1991, Francis joined a female group called Ex Girlfriend. Managed by the group Full Force to be their female counterpart, the group was signed to Forceful Records; a division of Reprise Records. Ex Girlfriend released their debut album X Marks the Spot in October 1991. The first single "Why Can't You Come Home" peaked in the top-five on Billboard's Hot R&B/Hip-Hop Songs chart. The success of the single invited them to perform on various TV shows including Soul Train. In August 1994, they released their second album It's a Woman Thang. Following the poor sales and management, Ex Girlfriend broke up in 1995.

=== 1992–2009: Broadway debut and acting career ===
In 1992, Francis starred in an off-Broadway musical production of Mama, I Want To Sing!. Francis portrayed the lead role of Doris Winter, a character whose life is based on American singer Doris Troy. Francis remained with the production until 1996. During her time with the production in 1995, a soundtrack (titled Mama, I Want to Sing – 1995 Original London Cast) was released which features Francis, Troy, and Chaka Khan.

In October 1998, Francis starred in the Broadway production of Footloose. Playing the role of "Rusty", Francis performed lead vocals on "Somebody's Eyes" and "Let's Hear It for the Boy" while also sharing lead vocals on "Holding Out for a Hero" and "Footloose (Finale)". The songs were released on the Footloose the Musical (1998 Original Broadway Cast) in 1999. In 2000, she made a guest appearance as "Val" in two episodes of the American crime drama television series Third Watch. In 2001, she played "Carrie" in the episode of "Zol Zein Gezint" for the medical drama series Strong Medicine. In the same year, she made a guest appearance as "Maureen" in the American sitcom Yes, Dear.

In 2002, Francis guest-starred in Son of the Beach, Fastlane, and movie In My Opinion. In 2003, she made a guest appearance in the American comedy sitcom Half & Half for the episode "The Big Phat Mouth Episode: Part 2" as the sarcastic receptionist "Regina". In 2004, Francis appeared as "Miss Hanks" in the first season of Phil of the Future. In 2005, she appeared as "Shelby" in the independent romance film Friends and Lovers.

=== 2011: The X Factor ===
In 2011, Francis auditioned for the first season of The X Factor USA in front of judges L.A. Reid, Paula Abdul, Cheryl Cole and Simon Cowell. She sang Aretha Franklin's "(You Make Me Feel Like) A Natural Woman" and received four yeses. At the beginning of bootcamp, she revealed that her father had just died. She made it through bootcamp and to judges' houses, where she was mentored by Nicole Scherzinger, who replaced Cole. She was eliminated in week 4 after ending up in the bottom 2 with Astro as Reid, Abdul and Cowell kept Astro. However, Francis received more votes than Astro meaning if Cowell sent the result to deadlock, Astro would’ve been eliminated.

Episode	Theme	Song choice	Result
Audition	Auditionee's choice	"(You Make Me Feel Like) A Natural Woman"	Through to Bootcamp
Bootcamp 1	Judges' choice	"A Song for You"	Advanced
Bootcamp 2	Judges' choice	"I Still Haven't Found What I'm Looking For"	Advanced
Bootcamp 3	Solo performance	"Summertime"	Advanced
Judges' houses	Solo	"Purple Rain"	Through to Live Shows
Live show 1	—N/a	"One More Try"	Saved by Nicole Scherzinger
Live show 2	Judges' choice	"Up to the Mountain"	Safe (6th)
Live show 3	Songs from Movies	"Queen of the Night"	Safe (8th)
Live show 4	Rock	"It's All Coming Back to Me Now"	Bottom two
Final showdown (live show 4)	Sing-off	"Amazing Grace"	Eliminated by judges' votes (10th)

=== 2015–2017: The Stacy Francis Show and Celebrity Big Brother ===
In February 2015, Francis began her own talk show "The Stacy Francis Show". The episodes are uploaded via the show's YouTube account. She also joined the cast of the third season for the TVOne series R&B Divas: Los Angeles.

In January 2017, Francis became a new star housemate on Celebrity Big Brother 19 in the United Kingdom. She finished in 11th place.

=== 2018–present: Recent activities ===
In 2018, Stacy signed to a global artist agency in London. She also released a single called "Into My Eyes", which featured American singer Brandy Norwood. Francis is currently working on West End in London.

== Philanthropy ==
In 2020 Stacy released her new song We Stand Together. In partnership with American Power and Gas. The company has fed over one million meals and is now partnering with Stacy and her family's Church The Universal Church of God to feed the Brownsville community where she grew up.

In 2021 Stacy Francis and the artist Alex Righetto, her life partner founded The Stacy Francis Music, Art & Education Foundation, with the purpose to give a future and the right to dream to those who have fewer opportunities. Giving food but also offering education and sustainability.

== Discography ==
Singles

- 2012: "Purple Rain"
- 2012: "I Am the Change"
- 2015: "I Still Believe"
- 2018: "Into My Eyes"
- 2020: "We Stand Together"
- 2022: "Eco Echo Earth Song"

== Filmography ==
=== Film ===
Year	Title	Role	Notes
1990	The Bonfire of the Vanities	Gospel singer	Cameo appearance
2002	In My Opinion	India	
2005	Friends and Lovers	Shelby	
2008	The Club	N/A	Short film
2009	The Citation	Parking enforcement officer	

=== Television ===
Year	Title	Role	Notes
2000	Third Watch	Val	Episodes: "32 Bullets and a Broken Heart", "A Thousand Points of Light)"
2001	Strong Medicine	Carrie	Episode: "Zol Zein Gezint"
2001	Yes, Dear	Maureen	Episode: "Baby Fight Club"
2002	Son of the Beach	Cleo Taurus	Episode: "In the Line of Booty"
2002	Fastlane	Girl singer No. 1	Episode: "Girls Own Juice"
2002	The Parkers	Choir singer	Episode: "Make a Joyful Noise"
2003	Half & Half	Regina	Episode: "The Big Phat Mouth: Part 2"
2004	Phil of the Future	Miss Hanks	Episode: "Future Tutor"
2011	The X Factor USA	Herself	Contestant
2011	The Wendy Williams Show	Herself	Guest appearance
2013	RAI	Herself	Performance at the New Year's Eve Italian national TV show with Paul Savino, Il Volo and Arisa
2017	Celebrity Big Brother	Herself	Housemate (series 19)
2019	Sky new	Herself	Guest appearance for the launch of Bare a pop opera)
2021	Expresso Morning SHOW	Herself	Guest appearance
2022	Well TV Channel Sky 810	Herself	Guest appearance
