= Little Jackie Wants to Be a Star =

Single by Lisa Lisa and Cult Jam

from the album Straight to the Sky
- Released: 1989
- Genre: R&B
- Label: Columbia
- Songwriter: Full Force
- Producer: Full Force

Lisa Lisa and Cult Jam singles chronology
"Go for Yours" (1988)	"Little Jackie Wants to Be a Star" (1989)	"Just Git It Together" (1989)

"Little Jackie Wants to Be a Star" is a song recorded by Lisa Lisa and Cult Jam that appeared on their 1989 album Straight to the Sky. Released as a single, it reached number 29 on the Billboard Hot 100 and number three on the R&B chart. In the UK, it peaked at number 90.

== Charts ==
Chart (1989–90)	Peak position
U.S. Billboard Hot 100	29
U.S. Billboard Hot Black Singles	3
U.S. Billboard Adult Contemporary	7
Australia (ARIA)	153
Dutch Singles Charts	6
New Zealand Singles Charts	10
UK Singles Chart	90
