= Zebrahead (film) =

1992 US romantic thriller film by Anthony Drazan

- Promotional film poster
- Directed by: Anthony Drazan
- Written by: Anthony Drazan
- Produced by: Jeff Dowd; Charles Mitchell
- Starring: Michael Rapaport; N'Bushe Wright
- Cinematography: Maryse Alberti
- Edited by: Elizabeth Kling
- Music by: Taj Mahal
- Distributed by: Triumph Releasing Corporation
- Release date: October 23, 1992
- Running time: 100 minutes
- Country: United States
- Language: English
- Box office: $1.4 million

Zebrahead is a 1992 American romantic drama film produced by Oliver Stone, written and directed by Anthony Drazan and starring Michael Rapaport and N'Bushe Wright. The film also stars Kevin Corrigan, Ray Sharkey, and Lois Bendler.

Set in Detroit, Michigan, the film is about an interracial romance between a white teenage boy and a black teenage girl and the resulting tensions among the characters.

The film was Drazan's writing and directorial debut and Rapaport and Wright's acting debut.

== Plot ==
Eighteen-year-old white Jewish DJ and rapper Zack lives with his single father, who runs a record store. Zack records music with his best friend, black rapper Dee.

Zack quarrels at school with his girlfriend Michelle, and they separate. He sees a new black student, Nikki, who turns out to be Dee's cousin. Zack becomes infatuated with Nikki.

Zack confides in Dee that he is attracted to Nikki, but is scared to proceed as a white man to a black woman. While Dee says Zack shouldn't be concerned over that, Dee's father warns Zack that he might receive negativity. Zack introduces himself to Nikki without disclosing his feelings toward her.

Zack's grandfather Saul tells him to woo Nikki with his DJ skills. Zack brings his turntable set to the school gymnasium and starts to DJ urban music. Nikki and other students enjoy dancing to the music, but some of the black students, including Larry, who is into Pan-Africanism, and Calvin "Nut", a delinquent bully, believe he's culturally appropriating.

Zack and Nikki become close. When he picks her up from her home for a date, they are subjected to harassment and racial epithets from Nut and his friends. Zack takes Nikki to his father's record store where they have their first kiss. One day after school, Zack brings Nikki to his house where they make love, with Zack's father secretly watching in amusement. Zack introduces Nikki to his father, who doesn't care that Nikki is black. Zack invites Nikki to a house party with some of his extended friends where she is the only black person. Nikki meets Michelle, who is happy that Zack and Nikki are together. Nikki encounters Zack and some of his friends making friendly, yet disrespectful racist sexual jokes about Nikki. She runs out of the party and breaks up with Zack. She tells Dee what happened and they both distance themselves from Zack. Nut and other black classmates tell Nikki to stay away from Zack, and that he had been playing a sick game with her. Nikki initially accepts Nut's advances before rejecting him.

After making amends and apologizing to Dee, Zack goes to Nikki's house and apologizes to her on her front porch. She invites him to a roller rink later that night. Nut was eavesdropping and, at the roller rink, he sexually harasses Nikki. Zack arrives and tells him to stop. As they fight Dee intervenes and pushes Nut to the ground, whereupon Nut fatally shoots Dee and runs from the rink.

At Dee's funeral, Zack recites the Mourner's Kaddish in Aramaic to Dee. Walking home from the funeral, Nikki is attacked by Nut who threatens to kill her before running away. At school, Zack and Nikki's classmates talk about what happened at the roller rink, with some suggesting that Dee would never have been shot if Zack and Nikki had never got together. Nikki dismisses that and runs from the classroom. Zack watches silently before also running out of the classroom. The school principal Mr. Cimino tells Zack to stick with his own race when it comes to relationships. He ignores him and notices Nikki crying in the hall. He goes over to comfort her and they hug.

== Cast ==
- Michael Rapaport as Zack
- N'Bushe Wright as Nikki
- Kevin Corrigan as Dominic
- Dan Ziskie as Mr. Cimino
- DeShonn Castle as Dee
- Lois Bendler as Dominic's Mother
- Shula Van Buren as Michelle
- Jason Willinger as Bobby
- Shirley Bunyas as Helen
- Martin Priest as Saul
- LZ Granderson as Larry
- Ron Johnson as Nut
- Ray Sharkey as Richard
- Jon Seda as Vinnie
- Marsha Florence as Mrs. Wilson
- Helen Shaver as Diane

== Reception ==
Zebrahead has an overall approval rating of 71% based on 16 reviews on Rotten Tomatoes.

At the 1992 Sundance Film Festival, director Anthony Drazan won the Filmmaker Trophy and nominated for the Grand Jury Prize.

At the 1992 Locarno Film Festival, Drazan won the Prize of the Ecumenical Jury and was nominated for the Golden Leopard.

Rapaport and Mahal were nominated at the 1993 Independent Spirit Award for Best Male Lead and Best Original Song.

Drazan was nominated for the Critics Award at the Deauville Film Festival.

Roger Ebert gave the film two out of four stars and said,

"Zebrahead" is not so much a movie as notes toward a movie - a good one, judging by what's on the screen. The strength of the central story is undermined by loose ends and subplots that are hinted at but never developed, and watching the film is a little like solving a puzzle. If the director didn't have the money to finish what he started - and apparently he didn't - then he should have been more merciless in his editing, leaving out the footage that's distracting.

== Soundtrack ==
The soundtrack was released on October 13, 1992, by Ruffhouse Records and Sony Music Entertainment. The soundtrack was produced and supervised by MC Serch, who contributes the track "Puff the Head". The album also features Nas, Boss, Kool Moe Dee and the Goats among others.

== See also ==
- Jungle Fever
- List of hood films
