= I Wonder If I Take You Home =

Single by Lisa Lisa and Cult Jam with Full Force

from the album Lisa Lisa & Cult Jam with Full Force
- B-side: "If I Take You Home Tonight"
- Released: May 10, 1985
- Recorded: 1984
- Genre: Freestyle
- Length: 3:57 (single version); 6:45 (album version); 6:48 (extended remix)
- Label: Columbia
- Songwriters: Curt Bedeau; Gerry Charles; Hugh L Clarke; Brian George; Lucien George; Paul George
- Producers: Full Force; Don Oriolo; Jürgen Korduletsch

Lisa Lisa and Cult Jam singles chronology
"I Wonder If I Take You Home" (1985)	"Can You Feel the Beat" (1985)

"I Wonder If I Take You Home" is a song recorded by Lisa Lisa and Cult Jam with Full Force in 1984.

== Release ==
Record producer Kenny Beck discovered the song in a "discard bin" at Personal Records while looking for songs to include on his debut album with the label. Impressed by the track, he created a compilation break-dancing album, CBS/SuzyQ, specifically to include the song. The album was released in Europe on CBS Records, where it immediately gained popularity as a dance hit with club DJs.

Soon American DJs began playing the song in the United States on Columbia Records. After the song received heavy play from these DJs, "I Wonder If I Take You Home" reached No. 1 on the Billboard Hot Dance Club Play chart for one week in June 1985.

On other US charts, it peaked at No. 6 on the R&B chart and reached No. 34 on the Hot 100. In 1991, the single was certified gold in the US by the RIAA. Overseas, it charted at No. 12 on the UK Singles Chart and number 41 in the Netherlands.

== Critical reception ==
"I Wonder If I Take You Home" was voted the eighth best single of 1985 in The Village Voice's annual Pazz & Jop critics poll. Robert Christgau, the poll's creator, ranked it twelfth on his own list of the year's best singles.

John Leland of Spin called it a "lightweight but catchy teenage hip-pop click. The "should-I-or-shouldn't-I" question has rarely been presented with such a keen appreciation of the merits of saying yes."

== Legacy ==
Its chorus has been interpolated in the Black Eyed Peas's 2005 hit song "Don't Phunk with My Heart", Fabolous's song with Lil' Mo titled "Take You Home", in the Angie Martinez single "Take You Home" featuring Kelis, and rapper Big Moe's song "I Wonder".

The song was sampled by Kylie Minogue in her song "Secret (Take You Home)", by Pitbull in his song "I Wonder", featuring Oobie, by R&B singer Paula Campbell in her single "Take You Home", which garnered much airplay on urban radio-stations around the Baltimore-DC area, and in the Junior M.A.F.I.A. featuring Aaliyah single, "I Need You Tonight".

In 2010, singer Adrienne Bailon and rapper Ghostface Killah covered the song as "Take You Home". In 2012, rapper Meek Mill used the chorus and a remixed beat for his song "Take You Home", featuring Wale and Big Sean, off his Dreamchasers 2 mixtape. In 2018, American singer-songwriter, rapper, and bassist Meshell Ndegeocello released a cover version of the song, featured on her album Ventriloquism. In 2026, Hip-Hop group Shoreline Mafia sampled the chorus in their song "TAKE U HOME"

== Charts ==
Chart performance for "I Wonder If I Take You Home"
Chart (1985)	Peak position
Netherlands (Single Top 100)	41
UK Singles (OCC)	12
US Billboard Hot 100	34
US Hot Dance Club Play (Billboard)	1
US Hot Black Singles (Billboard)	8

== Certifications ==
Certifications for "I Wonder If I Take You Home"
Region	Certification	Certified units/sales
United States (RIAA)	Gold	500,000^{^}
^{^} Shipments figures based on certification alone.

== See also ==
- List of number-one dance singles of 1985 (U.S.)
