= Lost in Emotion =

1987 single by Lisa Lisa and Cult Jam

Single by Lisa Lisa and Cult Jam

from the album Spanish Fly
- B-side: "Motion Is Lost"
- Released: July 1987
- Genre: Freestyle; dance-pop
- Length: 5:07 (album version); 4:36 (single mix version)
- Label: Columbia
- Songwriters: Curt Bedeau; Gerry Charles; Hugh L Clarke; Brian George; Lucien George; Paul George
- Producer: Full Force

Lisa Lisa and Cult Jam singles chronology
"Head to Toe" (1987)	"Lost in Emotion" (1987)	"Someone to Love Me for Me" (1987)

"Lost in Emotion" is a song by urban contemporary band Lisa Lisa and Cult Jam that appeared on their 1987 album Spanish Fly. The song reached number one on the US Billboard Hot 100 on October 17, 1987, becoming their second number-one single, after "Head to Toe" earlier in the year. Worldwide, the song entered the top 10 in Canada and the top 20 in New Zealand.

== Background ==
Full Force member Lou George describes "Lost in Emotion" as "a combination" of two Mary Wells' hits: "Two Lovers" and "You Beat Me to the Punch", an idea which occurred to George as the result of his playing Wells' Greatest Hits album on which "Two Lovers" and "You Beat Me to the Punch" were sequential tracks. George - "We didn't steal the riffs: all we did was get the flavoring...We [used] a xylophone and some bells because back in the Motown days they always used those simple instruments."

== Music video ==
The music video for the song was filmed at the 116th Street Festival in Harlem. With the exception of the group dance routine, the video was filmed in a way that gave it an unrehearsed feel, meant to match the carnival setting. In a 2020 interview with NJArts.net, Lisa Lisa recalled telling the director, "Look, just have the camera follow us and we're going to have fun with this."

== Charts ==
=== Weekly charts ===
Chart (1987)	Peak position
Australia (Australian Music Report)	83
Canada Top Singles (RPM)	7
Italy Airplay (Music & Media)	10
New Zealand (Recorded Music NZ)	15
UK Singles (Official Charts)	58
US Billboard Hot 100	1
US 12-inch Singles Sales (Billboard) Remix	3
US Adult Contemporary (Billboard)	27
US Dance Club Play (Billboard) Remix	8
US Hot Black Singles (Billboard)	1
US Hot Crossover 30 (Billboard)	1

=== Year-end charts ===
Chart (1987)	Position
Canada Top Singles (RPM)	59
US Billboard Hot 100	31
US 12-inch Singles Sales (Billboard)	45
US Hot Black Singles (Billboard)	45
US Hot Crossover Singles (Billboard)	3
