= Anthony Drazan =

American film director and screenwriter

- Born: United States
- Occupations: Film director, screenwriter
- Years active: 1991–present

Anthony Drazan is an American film director and screenwriter. He grew up in Rockville Centre, New York.

He is best known for writing and directing the 1992 film Zebrahead, his film writing and directing debut. The film was produced by Chuck Mitchell.

His other film directing credits include Imaginary Crimes starring Harvey Keitel and Hurlyburly starring Sean Penn. He also directed episodes of the television series Trinity and The West Wing. His last directing credit was the 2003 television pilot E.D.N.Y.

From 2011 to 2014, Drazan performed on stage in scripted one-man shows including an Off-Broadway production of The Leak, The Nod.
