= Thanks for My Child =

1988 single by Cheryl Pepsii Riley

Song by Cheryl Pepsii Riley
- Genre: R&B

"Thanks for My Child" is the debut single by Cheryl Pepsii Riley. Debuting on October 1, 1988, the single was the most successful release for Riley on the Hot Black Singles, and was her only release to make the Hot 100. "Thanks for My Child" made the Top 40 pop charts peaking at number thirty-two, and reached the number one spot on the Hot Black Singles chart, for one week.
