= Head to Toe (Lisa Lisa and Cult Jam song) =

Single by Lisa Lisa and Cult Jam

from the album Spanish Fly
- B-side: "You'll Never Change"
- Released: March 1987
- Recorded: 1986
- Genre: Freestyle; soul
- Length: 5:03 (Album Version); 4:02 (Single/Video Version)
- Label: Columbia
- Songwriters: Curt Bedeau, Gerry Charles, Hugh L Clarke, Brian George, Lucien George, Paul George
- Producer: Full Force

Lisa Lisa and Cult Jam singles chronology
"All Cried Out" (1986)	"Head to Toe" (1987)	"Lost in Emotion" (1987)

Music video
- "Head to Toe" on YouTube

"Head to Toe" is a song recorded by Lisa Lisa and Cult Jam that appeared on their 1987 album Spanish Fly and released as a single. The song hit number one on three charts: Billboard Hot 100 on June 20, 1987, the Hot Black Singles charts on May 30 of that year, and the dance charts on May 30. In Canada, the song topped the RPM 100 national singles chart on July 25 of the same year.

== Composition ==
The song is performed in the key of D major with a tempo of 114 beats per minute. The Los Angeles Times wrote in their 1987 review of the Spanish Fly album that Head to Toe "melodically owes a debt to the Supremes’ Back in My Arms Again".

== Charts ==
=== Weekly charts ===
Weekly chart performance for "Head to Toe"
Chart (1987)	Peak position
Australia (Kent Music Report)	52
Belgium (Ultratop 50 Flanders)	15
Canada Top Singles (RPM)	1
Netherlands (Dutch Top 40)	12
Netherlands (Single Top 100)	16
New Zealand (Recorded Music NZ)	9
UK Singles (Official Charts)	82
US Billboard Hot 100	1
US Dance Club Songs (Billboard)	1
US Dance Singles Sales (Billboard)	1
US Hot Black Singles (Billboard)	1

=== Year-end charts ===
1987 year-end chart performance for "Head to Toe"
Chart (1987)	Position
Canada Top Singles (RPM)	21
New Zealand (Recorded Music NZ)	41
US Billboard Hot 100	17
US Black Singles (Billboard)	31
US Crossover Singles (Billboard)	1
US Dance 12-Inch Sales (Billboard)	11
US Cash Box Top 100	1

== Certifications ==
Certifications for Head to Toe
Region	Certification	Certified units/sales
Canada (Music Canada)	Gold	50,000^{^}
United States (RIAA)	Gold	500,000^{^}
^{^} Shipments figures based on certification alone.
