= Lisa Lisa and Cult Jam =

American urban contemporary band

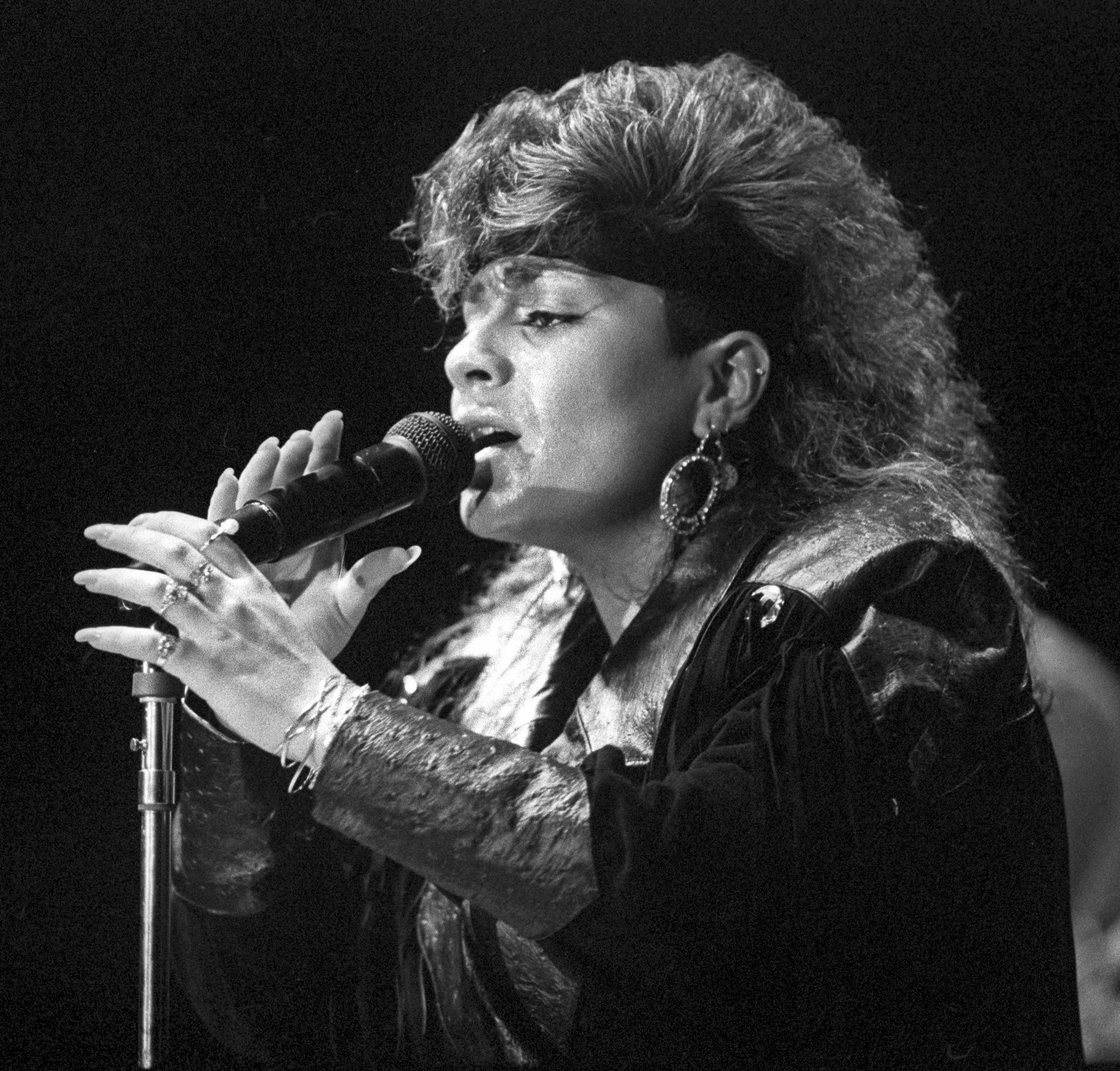
- Lisa Lisa during a group performance, 1987

Background information
- Origin: New York, New York, United States
- Genres: R&B; pop; freestyle; brown-eyed soul
- Years active: 1984–1991
- Labels: Columbia; Sony Music
- Past members: Lisa Lisa; Alex "Spanador" Moseley; Mike Hughes

Lisa Lisa and Cult Jam were a United States urban contemporary band and one of the first freestyle music groups to emerge from New York City in the 1980s. Cult Jam consisted of vocalist Lisa Lisa, born Lisa Velez, guitarist/bassist Alex "Spanador" Moseley, and drummer/keyboardist Mike Hughes. They were assembled and initially produced by Full Force.

== History ==
Lisa Lisa and Cult Jam formed after Lisa Velez auditioned for the production team Full Force at age 14. The group signed with Columbia Records, which released their debut single, "I Wonder If I Take You Home," to CBS Records' European division in 1983 for the compilation album Breakdancing. The track gained traction in American clubs in 1984 as an import, prompting Columbia to release it domestically. It topped Billboard's Dance/Disco chart, reached No. 6 on the R&B chart, and peaked at No. 34 on the pop chart in the summer of 1985. The single eventually went gold in the United States.

That same year, the group released their debut album, Lisa Lisa & Cult Jam with Full Force.

"I Wonder If I Take You Home" was followed by another club hit, "Can You Feel the Beat", which went to No. 40 on the R&B chart in late 1985. A sampling of the lyrics of this song was later used by Nina Sky for their 2004 hit single "Move Ya Body". Their third single, the ballad "All Cried Out", went gold, going to number No. 3 R&B and No. 8 pop in summer 1986. In 1997, "All Cried Out" was recorded by Allure, and was a hit in 1998. Lisa Lisa & Cult Jam with Full Force went platinum.

Their second album, Spanish Fly, was a success in 1987. It spawned two No. 1 pop hits, "Head to Toe" and "Lost in Emotion", both of which went gold. "Head to Toe" peaked at No. 1 R&B for two weeks and stayed in the pop top 5 nearly three months. "Lost in Emotion's" video became the fourth most played of 1987 on MTV. Spanish Fly went platinum, peaking at No. 7 on the Billboard 200 chart. Other singles from the album were the ballad "Someone to Love Me for Me", No. 7 R&B, and "Everything Will B-Fine", No. 9 R&B.

In between albums they recorded "Go for Yours", which was featured in the movie Caddyshack II.

Their third album was titled Straight to the Sky and was released in 1989. It featured the single "Little Jackie Wants to Be a Star". Their fourth and final album, Straight Outta Hell's Kitchen, was less of a success, though it did include a hit with "Let the Beat Hit 'Em", which was a No. 1 hit on both the R&B and club charts. The group disbanded in 1991.

On February 1, 2025, Lifetime debuted a movie based on the band titled Can You Feel the Beat: The Lisa Lisa Story.

== Reformation ==
Although Lisa Lisa & Cult Jam disbanded in 1991, Mike Hughes and Alex "Spanador" Moseley later reformed CultJam with vocalist Mystina Sol. The reformed group returned to live performances and released new original music, including the single "What Love Can Do" from the album CultJam Love.

== Discography ==
=== Studio albums ===
Year	Album details	Peak chart positions					Certifications
Year	Album details	US	US R&B	AUS	CAN	UK	Certifications
1985	Lisa Lisa & Cult Jam with Full Force: Release date: August 2, 1985; Label: Columbia	52	16	—	—	96	RIAA: Platinum
1987	Spanish Fly: Release date: April 8, 1987; Label: Columbia	7	7	—	18	—	RIAA: Platinum; MC: Gold
1989	Straight to the Sky: Release date: April 12, 1989; Label: Columbia	77	18	—	63	—	
1991	Straight Outta Hell's Kitchen: Release date: August 20, 1991; Label: Columbia	133	29	125	—	—	
"—" denotes a recording that did not chart or was not released in that territory.

=== Compilation albums ===
- Head to Toe (1995, Sony Music)
- Lisa Lisa and Friends (1995, Sony Music)
- Past, Present & Future (1996, Thump)
- Super Hits (1997, Sony Music)
- Playlist: The Very Best of Lisa Lisa & Cult Jam with Full Force (2010, Columbia/Legacy)

=== Singles ===
List of singles, with selected chart positions and certifications
Title	Year	Peak chart positions										Certifications	Album
Title	Year	US	US R&B	US Dance	AUS	BEL	CAN	IRE	NL	NZ	UK	Certifications	Album
"I Wonder If I Take You Home"	1985	34	6	1	—	—	—	24	41	—	12	RIAA: Gold	Lisa Lisa & Cult Jam with Full Force
"Can You Feel the Beat"	1985	69	40	6	—	—	—	—	—	—	97		Lisa Lisa & Cult Jam with Full Force
"All Cried Out"	1986	8	3	—	—	—	96	—	—	—	—	RIAA: Gold	Lisa Lisa & Cult Jam with Full Force
"Head to Toe"	1987	1	1	1	52	15	1	—	16	9	82	RIAA: Gold; MC: Gold	Spanish Fly
"Lost in Emotion"	1987	1	1	8	83	—	7	—	—	15	58	RIAA: Gold	Spanish Fly
"Someone to Love Me for Me"	1987	78	7	—	—	—	—	—	—	—	—		Spanish Fly
"Everything Will B-Fine"	1988	—	9	22	—	—	—	—	—	—	—		Spanish Fly
"Go for Yours"	1988	—	19	—	—	—	—	—	—	—	—		Caddyshack II
"Little Jackie Wants to Be a Star"	1989	29	3	—	153	16	98	—	6	10	90		Straight to the Sky
"Just Git It Together"	1989	—	16	7	—	—	—	—	—	—	—		Straight to the Sky
"Kiss Your Tears Away"	1989	—	26	—	—	—	—	—	—	—	—		Straight to the Sky
"Let the Beat Hit 'Em"	1991	37	1	1	72	27	—	27	30	—	17	RIAA: Gold	Straight Outta Hell's Kitchen
"Where Were You When I Needed You"	1991	—	65	—	—	—	—	—	—	—	—		Straight Outta Hell's Kitchen
"Forever"	1991	95	—	—	—	—	—	—	—	—	—		Straight Outta Hell's Kitchen
"Something 'bout Love"	1992	—	—	—	194	—	—	—	—	—	—		Straight Outta Hell's Kitchen
"Let the Beat Hit 'Em Part 2"	1992	—	—	—	—	—	—	—	—	—	49		Non-album single
"—" denotes a recording that did not chart or was not released in that territory.

== See also ==
- List of number-one hits (United States)
- List of artists who reached number one on the Hot 100 (U.S.)
- List of number-one dance hits (United States)
- List of artists who reached number one on the U.S. Dance chart
