= Full Force =

American R&B and hip hop singers

- Origin: Brooklyn, New York, U.S.
- Genres: Hip-hop; R&B; new jack swing
- Years active: 1976–present
- Labels: Columbia; Capitol; Calibre; TVT
- Members: "Paul Anthony" George; Brian "B-Fine" George; Lucien "Bowlegged Lou" George Jr. Hugh Junior "Shy Shy" Clark; Gerry "Baby Gerry" Charles
- Past members: Curt "Curt-T-T" Bedeau (deceased)
- Website: fullforce6.com

Full Force is an American music group of hip-hop and R&B singers, songwriters and producers from Brooklyn, New York.

== Members ==
- B-Fine (Brian George) – drums and drum programming, backing vocals
- Shy Shy (Hugh Junior Clark) – bass guitar, backing vocals
- Paul Anthony (Paul Anthony George) – vocals
- Bow-Legged Lou (Lucien George Jr.) – vocals
- Baby Gerry (Gerry Charles) – keyboards, synthesizers, backing vocals

=== Past members ===
- Curt-T-T (Curt Bedeau) – guitar, backing vocals (died August 17, 2026)

== History ==
=== Production and songwriting ===
The group produced and wrote music for numerous artists including UTFO, Doctor Ice, Samantha Fox, Patti LaBelle, The Force M.D.s, Britney Spears, James Brown, Lisa Lisa and Cult Jam, Backstreet Boys, 'N Sync, Wild Orchid, Cheryl Pepsii Riley, and Lil' Kim.

Full Force's breakthrough hit was UTFO's "Roxanne, Roxanne" (1984), a record that led to several answer records, most notably one by Roxanne Shanté. Through the 80s the group produced a string of major hits for Lisa Lisa and Cult Jam, including "I Wonder If I Take You Home", "All Cried Out", and "Head to Toe". They also scored hits for Samantha Fox, including "Naughty Girls (Need Love Too)" and "I Wanna Have Some Fun", and R&B singer Cheryl Pepsii Riley, including US R&B number one "Thanks for My Child". Their 1988 single "I'm Real" for James Brown gave the legendary singer his biggest hit for 14 years, peaking at US R&B number two.

Additionally, the group wrote and produced most of the singles from La Toya Jackson's fifth studio album La Toya, including "You're Gonna Get Rocked!" and "You Blew," as well as Patti LaBelle's track "I Got It Like That", for which they also provided prominent background vocals from her 1989 album Be Yourself. Full Force also provided backing vocals on two Bob Dylan songs recorded during sessions for Infidels: "Death Is Not the End" (released on Down in the Groove (1988)) and "Tell Me" (released on The Bootleg Series Volumes 1–3 (Rare & Unreleased) 1961–1991).

Full Force's biggest hit from the 1990s was the Backstreet Boys' 1998 US top 5/UK number 2 hit single "All I Have to Give". Full Force also worked with Prince's ex-wife Mayté on her 1995 album Child of the Sun, however the tracks remain unreleased.

Full Force also contributed to the production on Blaque's 2002 unreleased album, Blaque Out and Lil' Kim's 2003 release, La Bella Mafia, on her song "Can't Fuck with Queen Bee." The group produced Rihanna's "That La, La, La," which appears on her 2005 debut album Music of the Sun, and wrote the worldwide hit "Don't Phunk with My Heart" by Black Eyed Peas that same year.

=== Recording ===
In addition to their production résumé, the group have also released their own albums and music. Their 1985 single "Alice, I Want You Just for Me!" became a Top 10 hit in the UK in January 1986. They placed several hit singles under their own name on the US Billboard R&B chart during the latter half of the 1980s. Tracks such as "Unselfish Lover" (from their self-titled debut) and "Temporary Love Thing" (from their follow-up album, Full Force Get Busy 1 Time!) received substantial airplay. "All in My Mind" became the group's first and only single to date to reach the R&B Top Ten in 1988.

In 2001, Thump Records, a label known for its freestyle compilations, released the group's first greatest hits compilation Ahead of Their Time! Full Force's Greatest Hits. In 2007, on its Columbia release Legendary, the group has a song dedicated to Oprah Winfrey titled "We're Feeling You, Oprah." It was inspired by the related members' mother's love for Winfrey.

=== Acting ===
They appeared in the 1990 comedy film House Party and its first sequel as the bullies of Kid 'n Play. (Although not included on the initial release of House Party's official soundtrack album, Full Force's "Ain't My Type of Hype" was used in the film's dance-battle scene.) Bowlegged Lou also acted in Who's the Man? (1993) and played Lord Primus in the 2013 sci-fi TV series Body Jumpers. Full Force also appeared in the pool scene as karaoke judges in Longshot (2001).

== Discography ==
=== Albums ===
Year	Title	Label	Peak chart positions	
Year	Title	Label	US R&B	US 200
1985	Full Force	Columbia/CBS	29	160
1986	Full Force Get Busy 1 Time!	Columbia	19	156
1987	Guess Who's Comin' to the Crib?	Columbia	28	126
1989	Smoove	Columbia	61	—
1992	Don't Sleep	Capitol/EMI	—	—
1995	Sugar on Top	Calibre	—	—
2001	Still Standing	TVT	—	—
2009	Full Force, Of Cource	Full Force Records	—	—
2014	With Love from Our Friends	Full Force Records	—	—
"—" denotes releases that did not chart or were not released in that territory.

=== Singles ===
Year	Title	Label	Peak chart positions				
Year	Title	Label	US R&B	US Adult	US Pop	US Dance	UK
1980	"Turn You On" / "Groovin"	Dazz Records	—	—	—	—	—
1985	"I Wonder If I Take You Home" (Lisa Lisa & Cult Jam with Full Force)	Columbia	6	—	34	1	12
1985	"Can You Feel the Beat" (Lisa Lisa & Cult Jam with Full Force)	Columbia	40	—	69	9	97
1985	"Alice, I Want You Just for Me!"	CBS	16	—	—	34	9
1985	"Girl If You Take Me Home"	Columbia/CBS	78	—	—	32	—
1986	"Unselfish Lover"	Columbia/CBS	34	—	—	—	—
1986	"All Cried Out" / "Behind My Eyes" (Lisa Lisa & Cult Jam with Full Force)	Columbia/CBS	3	—	8	—	—
1986	"Temporary Love Thing"	Columbia/CBS	12	—	—	—	—
1986	"Unfaithful (So Much)"	Columbia/CBS	20	—	—	16	—
1987	"Old Flames Never Die"	Columbia/CBS	27	—	—	44	—
1987	"Love Is for Suckers (Like Me and You)" "Sucker Punch" (B-side)	Columbia/CBS	11	—	—	—	—
1987	"Take Care of Homework"	Columbia/CBS	—	—	—	—	—
1987	"Someone to Love Me for Me" (Lisa Lisa & Cult Jam featuring Full Force)	Columbia/CBS	7	15	78	—	—
1988	"Your Love Is So Def"	Columbia/CBS	24	—	—	—	—
1988	"Every Little Thing About You" (Cheryl Pepsii Riley & Full Force)	Columbia/CBS	—	—	—	—	—
1988	"Go for Yours" (Lisa Lisa & Cult Jam with Full Force)	Columbia/CBS	19	—	—	—	—
1988	"All in My Mind"	Columbia/CBS	6	—	—	—	—
1988	"You and Me" ^{[A]} (James Brown with Full Force)	Scotti Bros. Records	—	—	—	—	—
1989	"After School" (The Flirts featuring Full Force)	"O" Records	—	—	—	—	—
1989	"Ain't My Type of Hype"	Columbia/CBS	27	—	—	45	—
1989	"Friends B-4 Lovers"	Columbia/CBS	21	—	—	—	—
1990	"Kiss Those Lips"	Columbia/CBS	55	—	—	—	—
1992	"Nice N Sleazy"	Capitol	70	—	—	—	—
1992	"Quickie"	Capitol	26	—	—	—	—
"—" denotes releases that did not chart or were not released in that territory.

- ^{A} "You and Me" was released only in France.

== As producers ==
Year	Artist	Title	Peak chart positions			
Year	Artist	Title	UK	US Pop	US Dance	US R&B
1984	UTFO	"Roxanne, Roxanne / Hanging Out"	—	—	—	—
1984	UTFO	"Beats and Rhymes"	—	—	—	—
1984	UTFO with Roxanne	"The Real Roxanne / Roxanne's Back Side"	—	—	—	—
1985	Roxanne with Hitman Howie Tee	"Romeo"	—	—	—	—
1986	La La	"(If You) Love Me Just a Little"	—	—	—	22
1987	La La	"My Love Is on the Money"	—	—	—	48
1987	Lisa Lisa & Cult Jam	"Head to Toe"	82	1	1	1
1987	Lisa Lisa & Cult Jam	"Lost in Emotion"	58	1	8	1
1987	Lisa Lisa & Cult Jam	"Everything Will B-Fine"	—	—	22	9
1987	Samantha Fox	"Naughty Girls Need Love Too"	31	3	—	—
1988	Samantha Fox	"I Wanna Have Some Fun"	63	8	—	—
1988	La Toya Jackson	"You're Gonna Get Rocked!"	90	—	—	66
1988	The Weather Girls	"Land of the Believer"	—	—	—	—
1988	Doctor Ice	"Sue Me!"	—	—	—	—
1988	James Brown	"I'm Real"	31	—	—	2
1988	James Brown	"Static"	83	—	—	5
1988	Cheryl Pepsii Riley	"Thanks for My Child"	75	32	—	1
1989	Cheryl Pepsii Riley	"Me Myself & I"	—	—	—	18
1989	Lisa Lisa & Cult Jam	"Little Jackie Wants to Be a Star"	90	29	—	3
1989	Lisa Lisa & Cult Jam	"Just Git It Together"	—	—	7	16
1989	Doctor Ice	"Love Jones"	—	—	—	—
1989	Whodini	"Anyway I Gotta Swing It"	—	—	—	—
1990	Jasmine Guy	"Try Me"	—	—	—	14
1991	Cheryl Pepsii Riley	"How Can You Hurt the One You Love"	—	—	—	18
1991	Ex Girlfriend	"Why Can't You Come Home"	—	78	—	5
1991	Ex Girlfriend	"You (You're the One for Me)"	—	—	—	35
1991	Samantha Fox	"(Hurt Me! Hurt Me!) But the Pants Stay On"	—	—	—	—
1991	Cheryl Pepsii Riley	"Ain't No Way"	—	—	—	45
1993	Cheryl Pepsii Riley	"Gimme"	—	—	—	36
1997	Backstreet Boys	"All I Have to Give"	2	5	—	—
1998	*NSYNC	"I Just Wanna Be with You"	—	—	—	—
1998	Wild Orchid	"Holding On"	—	—	—	—
2000	3LW	"More Than Friends (That's Right)"	—	—	—	—
2002	3LW	"I Need That (I Want That)"	—	—	—	—
"—" denotes releases that did not chart or were not released in that territory.

== Filmography ==
- 1985: Krush Groove
- 1990: House Party
- 1991: House Party 2
- 1993: Who's the Man?
- 2001: Longshot (film)
