= Kurtis Blow discography =

This article presents the discography of Kurtis Blow, an American hip hop artist.

== Albums ==
=== Studio albums ===
List of studio albums, with selected chart positions
Title	Album details	Peak chart positions	
Title	Album details	US	US R&B /HH
Kurtis Blow	Released: September 29, 1980; Label: Mercury; Formats: CD, LP, cassette, digital download	71	10
Deuce	Released: June 15, 1981; Label: Mercury (US), Polygram (EU); Formats: LP, cassette	137	35
Tough	Released: 1982; Label: Mercury; Formats: LP, cassette, digital download	167	38
Ego Trip	Released: 1984; Label: Mercury/Polydor; Formats: LP, cassette	83	18
America	Released: October, 1985; Label: Mercury (US), Club (UK); Formats: LP, cassette	153	18
Kingdom Blow	Released: 1986; Label: Mercury/Polygram (US), Club (UK); Formats: CD, LP, cassette, digital download, streaming	196	16
Back by Popular Demand	Released: 1988; Label: Mercury; Formats: CD, LP, cassette, digital download, streaming	—	84
"—" denotes releases that did not chart.

=== Group albums ===
List of group albums
Title	Album details
Urban Gypsys (by Urban Gypsys)	Released: 1999; Label: Gypsy Rock/Quatrophonic; Formats: CD

=== Collaborative albums ===
List of collaborative albums
Title	Album details
Just Do It (with The Trinity)	Released: November 8, 2004; Label: B4; Formats: CD, digital download, streaming
Father, Son & Holy Ghost (with The Trinity)	Released: August 25, 2009; Label: B4; Formats: digital download, streaming

=== Live albums ===
List of live albums
Title	Album details
Hip Hop Anniversary Europe Tour	Released: July 11, 2008; Label: ZYX; Formats: digital download, streaming

=== Compilation albums ===
List of compilation albums
Title	Album details
The Best Rapper on the Scene	Released: 1983; Label: Mercury; Formats: CD, LP
Série Cinza - The Best of Kurtis Blow	Released: 1986; Label: Mercury; Formats: LP
Best of... Rappin'	Released: 1990; Label: Mercury; Formats: CD, LP, cassette
The Breaks	Released: 1991; Label: PolyGram Special Projects; Formats: cassette
The Best of Kurtis Blow	Released: June 7, 1994; Label: Mercury/Chronicles; Formats: CD, cassette, digital download, streaming
Kurtis Blow Presents the History of Rap, Vol. 1: The Genesis	Released: August 19, 1997; Label: Rhino; Formats: CD
Kurtis Blow Presents the History of Rap, Vol. 2: The Birth of the Rap Record	Released: August 19, 1997; Label: Rhino; Formats: CD
Kurtis Blow Presents the History of Rap, Vol. 3: The Golden Age	Released: August 19, 1997; Label: Rhino; Formats: CD
20th Century Master - The Millennium Collection: The Best of Kurtis Blow	Released: April 15, 2003; Label: Mercury; Formats: CD, digital download, streaming
Kurtis Blow Presents: Hip Hop Ministry	Released: April 24, 2007; Label: Holy Hip Hop/EMI Christian Music; Formats: CD
King of Rap, Vol. 1	Released: February 27, 2015; Label: Krush; Formats: digital download

== EPs ==
List of extended plays with selected chart positions
Title	EP details	Peak chart positions
Title	EP details	US R&B /HH
Party Time?	Released: 1983; Label: Mercury; Format: LP, cassette	36
Break to Rap (compilation EP)	Released: 1983; Label: Mercury; Format: LP, cassette	—
The Breaks Remixes	Released: May 31, 1999; Label: Mole Listening Pearls; Format: digital download	—
Best Of (re-recordings EP)	Released: June 19, 2013; Label: X-Ray; Format: digital download, streaming	—
Let's Move It (Remix Collection) (with Jazz Voice)	Released: July 18, 2016; Label: Bizarre; Format: digital download, streaming	—
"—" denotes a recording that did not chart.

== Singles ==
=== As lead artist ===
List of singles as lead artist, with selected chart positions, showing year released and album name
Title	Year	Peak chart positions								Certifications	Album
Title	Year	US	US Dance	US R&B	US Rap	GER	NED	NZ	UK	Certifications	Album
"Christmas Rappin'"	1979	—	—	―	*	—	—	―	30		Originally a non-album single (Note: "Christmas Rappin'" was later added as bonus track in Kurtis Blow CD version.)
"Rappin' Blow"	1979	—	—	—	*	—	29	―	—		Kurtis Blow
"The Breaks"	1980	87	9	4	*	56	—	25	47	RIAA: Gold	Kurtis Blow
"Throughout Your Years"	1980	—	75	31	*	—	—	―	—		Kurtis Blow
"Hard Times"	1981	―	—	75	*	—	—	―	—		Kurtis Blow
"It's Gettin' Hot"	1981	―	—	—	*	—	—	―	—		Deuce
"Starlife"	1981	―	—	—	*	―	—	—	―		Deuce
"Do the Do"	1981	―	—	—	*	—	—	―	—		Deuce
"Tough"	1982	—	—	37	*	—	—	―	—		Tough
"Daydreamin'"	1982	—	—	—	*	—	—	―	—		Tough
"Party Time?"	1983	—	39	35	*	—	—	―	67		Party Time?
"Nervous"	1983	—	—	―	*	—	—	―	—		Party Time?
"8 Million Stories" (featuring Run-DMC)	1984	—	—	45	*	—	—	―	—		Ego Trip
"Ego Trip"	1984	—	—	—	*	—	—	―	—		Ego Trip
"Basketball"	1984	71	—	29	*	—	—	―	—		Ego Trip
"Under Fire"	1984	—	—	—	*	―	—	―	—		Ego Trip
"America"	1985	―	—	74	*	―	—	―	—		America
"If I Ruled the World"	1985	—	25	16	*	—	—	40	24		America
"AJ is Cool"	1985	—	—	—	*	—	—	—	—		America
"Respect to the King"	1985	—	—	—	*	—	—	—	—		America
"I'm Chillin'"	1986	―	—	20	*	—	—	―	64		Kingdom Blow
"The Bronx"	1986	―	—	―	*	—	—	―	—		Kingdom Blow
"Back by Popular Demand"	1988	―	—	―	*	—	—	―	—		Back by Popular Demand
"Only the Strong Survive"	1988	―	—	―	*	—	—	―	—		Back by Popular Demand
"Chillin' at the Spot"	1994	—	—	―	—	—	—	―	—		Non-album singles
"Christmas Rappin' 95"	1994	―	—	― (Note: "Christmas Rappin' 95" did not enter the Hot R&B/Hip-Hop Songs, but peaked at number 52 on the R&B/Hip-Hop Airplay.)	—	—	—	―	—		Non-album singles
"Freak Rock Till the Breakadawn"	1995	―	—	―	—	—	—	―	—		Non-album singles
"Christmas Rappin'" (re-release)	1999	—	—	― (Note: "Christmas Rappin'" did not enter the Hot R&B/Hip-Hop Songs, but peaked at number 71 on the Hot R&B/Hip-Hop Songs Sales.)	29	—	—	―	—		Non-album singles
"—" denotes releases that did not chart. "*" indicates a chart that did not exist at the time.

=== As featured artist ===
Title	Year	Album
"Calling You" (Power Nation featuring Kurtis Blow)	1994	Non-album singles
"I Want Some Holiday" (Sonic Boom featuring Kurtis Blow)	1995	Non-album singles
"In the Name of Love" (Mephisto featuring Kurtis Blow)	2010	Non-album singles
"Hip Rock" (Bride Dressed in Black featuring Kurtis Blow)	2013	Battle the Beast
"Real Hip Hop" (Queen P. featuring Kurtis Blow and DJ Tomekk)	2014	The Legendary Hip Hop Sway
"Joy and Pain: The Lifelines Remixes" (Frankie Beverly & Maze featuring Kurtis Blow, Hank Shocklee, Eric Sadler, and Paul Shabazz)	2021	Non-album singles
"The Wiggle (Scott Diaz Remix)" (Ferry Ultra featuring Scott Diaz and Kurtis Blow)	2023	Non-album singles

== Guest appearances ==
Title	Year	Artist(s)	Album
"Hey Tee Bone"	1987	Trouble Funk, Renée Geyer	Trouble Over Here
"Break It Up"	1987	Trouble Funk	Trouble Over Here
"I Know How (To Make You Love Me) - Street Beat"	1988	Nia Peeples	Nothin' But Trouble
"Joy and Pain"	1989	Frankie Beverly & Maze, Hank Shocklee, Eric Sadler, Paul Shabazz	The Greatest Hits: Lifelines Volume 1
"I Want You Back"	1990	Adamski	Doctor Adamski's Musical Pharmacy
"Old School Jam"	1995	DJ Honda, Donald D, Prince Whipper Whip	DJ Honda
"Perché si!"	1999	Articolo 31	Perché Si!
"Krush Groove 2000"	2000	Spontaneous	Spur of the Moment Musik
"Gimme the Breaks"	2003	A.Skillz, Krafty Kuts	Tricka Technology
"Kurtis Blow Intro"	2006	Young Bo	This Is Hip-Hop
"Voice Mail"	2009	Pac Nashun, Future, Motorbike	Eyez Wide Shut
"Magic Words"	2009	Mr Kneel	Magic Words
"My Drive"	2010	OverTyme Simms	Lyfe of the Kid
"It's Time"	2010	The Much Luvv Fam, Young Chozen	Luvv to Dance
"Choices"	2011	Mason	They Are Among Us
"Going Diamond"	2012	Kay	My Name Is Kay
"The Wiggle"	2012	Ferry Ultra	Ferry Ultra and the Homeless Funkers
"Just Do It"	2013	Chris Flow, B.B. Jay, Ricky B, BLUECHIP	Kentucky Fried Faith
"Crunk Wit It"	2013	Chris Flow, Ricky B, BLUECHIP	Kentucky Fried Faith
"Grace of God"	2013	Chris Flow, B.B. Jay, Ricky B	Kentucky Fried Faith
"God Bless You Ma"	2013	Chris Flow, B.B. Jay, Ricky B	Kentucky Fried Faith
"Kurtis Blow"	2013	DJ Tomekk	The Legendary Hip Hop Sway
"Give Him Glory"	2013	E-Fetti	Untitled (The Album)
"HIT Rappers"	2014	Gorzki, Snoop Dogg, PMD, Kokane, Rakaa, Alicja Wegorzewska, Prodigal Sunn, Curtis Young, Medus	Inter Arma Caritas
"The Naked Truth"	2014	Claudio Esposito, Kernmaan	Die Nackte Wahrheit
"Hustle Sprouts"	2016	Mr Kneel	In the Wilderness
"B-Boy MC"	2017	Jc & the Boyz	B-Boy MC
"Batam Palmas"	2017	Thaide	Vamo Que Vamo Que o Som Não Pode Parar
"I Made It"	2019	Aubreyus, Malice, E.T, Nelson Sel	I Made It Out
"Senza Frontierra"	2019	Besidos, MC Yinka, Steryo, Criz Panic, TML	Helsinki
"Kurtis Blow Interlude"	2020	Brainpower	The Amsterdam Archives
"Get it Out Remix"	2021	Yung D. Rhodes	Tyme2Win
"Damals"	2021	3.Stock Music, Mr. Schnabel, Young CRhyme	Kollaboration (Vol.1)
"Earth's Tide"	2022	King Khazm	Return of a MAD
"Rolling 200 Deep XIV"	2023	DJ Kay Slay, Sticky Fingaz, Paula Perry, Tah Mel, Da Inphamus Amadeuz, Cortez Bodega, Superstar Floss, Innocent?, MC TNT, Tracey Lee, Aobie	Rolling 200 Deep
