= Rappin' Rodney =

Studio album by Rodney Dangerfield
- Released: 1983
- Studios: The Record Plant, New York
- Genres: Comedy hip-hop; stand-up comedy
- Length: 40:34
- Label: RCA Victor (AFL1-4869)
- Producers: Estelle Endler; Rodney Dangerfield; J.B. Moore; Robert Ford Jr.

Rappin' Rodney is a comedy album by American comedian Rodney Dangerfield issued by RCA Records in 1983. The title track is a rap-influenced novelty song co-written by J.B. Moore and Robert Ford Jr., the same songwriters who worked with Kurtis Blow on "The Breaks". Dennis Blair co-wrote the song. The accompanying music video, which includes cameos from Pat Benatar and Don Novello (as Father Guido Sarducci), was played heavily on MTV at the time of release.

The rest of the album consists of live stand-up comedy under the titles "Rodney Rappin'" and "Rodney Continues Rappin'", recorded live at Catch a Rising Star, in New York City.

The song peaked at number 83 on Billboard's Hot 100 chart. It soon earned Dangerfield a nomination for the Grammy Award for Best Comedy Recording.

== Track listing ==
=== Side A ===
No.	Title	Writer(s)	Length
1.	"Rodney Rappin'"	Rodney Dangerfield	18:30

=== Side B ===
No.	Title	Writer(s)	Length
1.	"Rappin' Rodney"	Rodney Dangerfield, J.B. Moore, Robert Ford Jr., Dennis Blair, Douglas Hoyt, Scott Henry	5:08
2.	"Rodney Continues Rappin'"	Rodney Dangerfield	16:56

== Personnel ==
- Creative consultant: Dennis Blair
- Production assistant: Kathy Lymberopoulos
- Photography: Bernard Vidal
- Engineer: Bob Merritt
- Edited and mixed at the Record Plant, Los Angeles.
- Mastered at A&M studios, Los Angeles by Bernie Grundman
