= The Funk Hunters =

Canadian electronic music duo

- Origin: Vancouver, British Columbia, Canada
- Genres: Future funk; glitch hop; funk; soul; electro disco; hip hop
- Years active: 2009–present
- Labels: Westwood Recordings; Interscope; Monstercat
- Members: Duncan Smith; Nick Middleton
- Website: thefunkhunters.com

The Funk Hunters are a Canadian electronic DJ duo composed of Nick Middleton and Duncan Smith, based in Vancouver. They have toured globally, performing at a number of major festivals such as Shambhala, Electric Forest, Calgary Stampede, and Bass Coast, as well as supporting other artists, including Chali 2na and GRiZ. Middleton also runs his own record label, Westwood Recordings, as well as Midnight Agency, which represents musical artists.

== History ==
Nick Middleton and Duncan Smith met in 2008 while working at the Gulf Islands Film and Television School, a media school located on Galiano Island, British Columbia. The two bonded over their mutual appreciation for funk and electronic dance music. Inspired by this connection, they invested in a pair of turntables and began DJing at local house parties.

An influence in the Funk Hunters' development was the annual Shambhala Music Festival in the West Kootenays region of southern British Columbia. Middleton first attended the festival in its formative years and soon began bringing Smith along with him.

Since 2009, the Funk Hunters have regularly performed at Shambhala and other festivals, including Burning Man, Electric Forest, Bass Coast, Atmosphere Gathering, Tall Tree Festival, and the Squamish Valley Music Festival. As their reputation grew, they began touring nationally and later internationally, performing in the United States, across Europe, Brazil, Central America, and throughout Australia and New Zealand.

In 2014, the duo collaborated with Jurassic 5 rapper Chali 2na on the track "Do This for You".

In 2015, the Funk Hunters featured on two tracks from the Delhi 2 Dublin album We're All Desi, which was published on Middleton's own label, Westwood Recordings, as was the 2016 remix version, We're All Desi (Remixed).

In 2019, American musician GRiZ invited the Funk Hunters to support him on his North American Ride Waves tour, which included performances at Chicago's Navy Pier, Hollywood Palladium and the Greek Theatre in Los Angeles, and numerous other stops across Canada, the United States, and Costa Rica, among others.

=== Road Gold certification ===
In 2020, the Funk Hunters received Road Gold certification from the Canadian Independent Music Association, in recognition of exceeding 25,000 ticket sales domestically in a single year, making them the first electronic act to receive this honour. This was part of their Typecast Tour, which included sold-out shows at Vancouver's Commodore Ballroom as well as headlining Canadian festivals such as the Calgary Stampede and Shambhala.

== Westwood Recordings ==
In 2013, Middleton launched his own record label, which he called Westwood Recordings. Artists whose work has been published on the label include A.Skillz, Delhi 2 Dublin, the Funk Hunters, ill-esha, K Theory, Krafty Kuts, LIINKS, Smalltown DJs, and So Sus.

In 2018, an album called the Westwood 100th Release Compilation was released, featuring 43 artists.

== Midnight Agency ==
In 2021, Middleton co-founded Midnight Agency with business partner Grant Paley. The company represents local and international musical artists, including Too Many Zooz, Matthew Good, and DJ Shub.

== Discography ==
Studio albums

- Typecast (2018)
- Typecast (Remixes) (2019)
- Music w/Friends (2022)

EPs

- Harvest Edits (2011)
- Illectric EP with Chali 2na (2016)

Compilations

- The Funk Hunters vs L&C – Fully Loaded Vol. 1 (2012)
- The Funk Hunters with DJ Wood & Timothy Wisdom – Fully Loaded Vol. 2 (2012)
- The Funk Hunters & SkiiTour – Fully Loaded Vol. 4 (2013)

Singles

- "Lunar Smack" with Moontricks (2013)
- The Funk Hunters + CMC & Silenta – "Soul Beat" feat. Erica Dee and Honey Larochelle (2013)
- The Funk Hunters + CMC & Silenta – "Do This for You" feat. Chali 2na (2014)
- The Funk Hunters + CMC & Silenta – "Shock Rollin" feat. See-I (2014)
- The Funk Hunters & DJ Wood – "Nasty" (2014)
- The Funk Hunters & Chali 2na – "Word to Spread" feat. Tom Thum (2016)
- The Funk Hunters & Chali 2na – "Get Involved" feat. Defunk (2016)
- The Funk Hunters & Chali 2na – "Oh Shit/Right Right Up" (2017)
- "Say Something" feat. LIINKS (2017)
- "Hands Up (Raise Your Fist)" feat. Leo Napier (2017)
- "Turn Down the Silence" feat. Dirty Radio (2018)
- "Party Rockin" (2018)
- "Body Move" with A.Skillz (2019)
- The Funk Hunters + CMC & Silenta – "Tribute" (2020)
- "Get Up N Go" with Moontricks (2020)
- "Empire" with Stickybuds (2020)
- "Tonight" with Kotek (2021)
- "Say Something (acoustic)" with LIINKS (2021)
- "Warn Ya" with Defunk and Akylla (2021)
- "Hit Like" with Eskei83 (2021)
- "La Puta Ama" with LŪN (2022)
- "Eleanor Rigby" with Killwill (2023)
- "All of a Sudden" with Dr. Fresch and Chali 2na (2023)
- "I Like 2 Party" with the Sponges (2024)
- "Xerox" with LŪN (2025)
- "This Is the Sound" with K Theory (2025)
- Chali 2na, Cut Chemist, and the Funk Hunters – "The Rock" (2025)

Remixes

- Big Gigantic – "Got the Love (The Funk Hunters Remix)" (2017)
- Haywyre – "With You (the Funk Hunters & Kotek remix)"
- The Polish Ambassador feat Rhymewave – "Blue Blockin' Hip Hop (The Funk Hunters Remix)"
- The Free Label & Friends – "Vanilla Affogato (The Funk Hunters Remix)" (2025)
