= Finger Lickin' Records =

English record label

Finger Lickin' Records is an English record label. Founded by Justin Rushmore and Jem Panufnik (known collectively as Soul of Man) in 1998, Finger Lickin' is solely dedicated to dance music, mainly covering breakbeat, electro and hip hop, elements of disco and funk can be found throughout these genres.

== Artists On Label ==
Artists on the label include the Plump DJs, Soul of Man, A Skillz, Slyde, Brothers Bud, The Drumattic Twins, 2 InDaBush, Freaky Jalapeno, Grinny Grandad as well as working very closely with Krafty Kuts, and one off releases from Dreadzone, Osmosis, Criminal Element Orchestra and Arc-En-Ciel.

== Awards ==
Finger Lickin' have placed highly in the Breakspoll awards, winning best label in 2002 through 2005. Several of their artists have also been recognized by Breakspoll, in particular Plump DJs who took three awards in 2004: Best Producer, Best Single (for Soul Vibrates/Bullet Train) and Best Remix (Freestylers – Push Up).

== See also ==
- List of record labels
