= Full Force (disambiguation) =

Full Force is a group of R&B performers and producers from Brooklyn, New York, United States.

Full Force may also refer to:

- Full Force (Full Force album), 1985
- Full Force (Art Ensemble of Chicago album), 1980
- Fullforce, a Swedish power metal band that formed in late 2008
- Full Force (music festival), German music festival previously called With Full Force
- Full Force, a documentary made from the YouTuber "IDubbbz"
