= Guess Who's Comin' to the Crib? =

Studio album by Full Force
- Released: 1987
- Recorded: 1987
- Genre: R&B
- Label: Columbia
- Producer: Full Force, J.B. Moore, Robert Ford Jr.

Full Force chronology
Full Force Get Busy 1 Time! (1986)	Guess Who's Comin' to the Crib? (1987)	Smoove (1989)

Professional ratings
Review scores
Source	Rating
Allmusic	3/5 stars
New Musical Express	4/10

Guess Who's Comin' to the Crib? is the 1987 third album by the Brooklyn, New York-based R&B group Full Force. This album featured the band's biggest hit as a recording act with "All in My Mind" just missing the R&B top 5. Other hits include the near-top ten "Love Is for Suckers (Like You and Me)" and the #24 hit, "Your Love Is So Def".

== Track listing ==
1. "Take Care of Homework" (6:03)
2. "Love Is for Suckers (Like You and Me)" (4:37)
3. "All in My Mind" (5:28)
4. "3 O'Clock...School's Out!" (5:22)
5. "Child's Play (Part 3)" (1:42)
6. "Full Force Git Money $" (3:39)
7. "Your Love Is So Def" (5:15)
8. "Katty Women" (5:02)
9. "Low Blow Brenda" (4:11)
10. "Black Radio" (4:21)
- All songs written and performed by Full Force.

== Chart performance ==
Chart (1987)	Peak positions
Billboard 200	126
Billboard Top R&B Albums	28

=== Singles ===
Year	Single	US R&B
1987	"Love Is for Suckers (Like Me and You)"	11
1987	"All in My Mind"	6
1987	"Your Love Is So Def"	24
1987	"Take Care of Homework"	—
