= Deuce (Kurtis Blow album) =

Studio album by Kurtis Blow
- Released: June 15, 1981
- Studio: Greene St.
- Genre: Hip-hop
- Length: 34:40
- Label: Mercury
- Producer: J.B. Moore, Robert Ford Jr.

Kurtis Blow chronology
Kurtis Blow (1980)	Deuce (1981)	Tough (1982)

Professional ratings
Review scores
Source	Rating
AllMusic	4/5 stars
Christgau's Record Guide	B+
The Encyclopedia of Popular Music	2/5 stars
(The New) Rolling Stone Album Guide	2/5 stars

Deuce is the second album by the American musician Kurtis Blow. It was released on June 15, 1981, by Mercury Records. It peaked at number 35 on the R&B charts, and number 137 on the Billboard 200.

== Track listing ==
1. "Deuce" (Kurtis Blow) – 5:31
2. "It's Gettin' Hot" (Robert Ford, Jr., J.B. Moore) – 5:28
3. "Getaway" (Jimmy Bralower, Ford, Jr., Moore, Dean Swenson) – 6:58
4. "Starlife" (Blow, Moore, Larry Smith, William Whiting) – 5:20
5. "Take It to the Bridge" – 4:11
6. "Do the Do" (Blow, Bralower, Seth Glassman, Russell Simmons, Moore) – 3:03
7. "Rockin'" (Blow, David Reeves) – 4:09

== Personnel ==
- Onaje Allan Gumbs: Piano
- Robbie Kondor: Synthesizers and electric piano
- John Tropea: Guitars
- David Reeves, Dean Ballin, Dean Swenson, Hankie Grate: Additional guitars
- J. B. Moore: Backing vocals, additional guitars
- Seth Glassman: Bass
- Jimmy Bralower: Drums, percussion
- Jaime Delgado: Timbales, congas
- Mark "Sugar Rico" Rivera: Saxophone
- Deborah L. Cole, Harold B. Lee, Travis Milner, Wayne Garfield: Backing vocals
