= Liveandirect =

Live album by Adamski
- Released: 27 November 1989
- Recorded: Various clubs and raves in the United Kingdom and Amnesia, Ibiza, summer 1989
- Genres: House; acid house; techno; rave
- Length: 35:21
- Label: MCA
- Producer: Adamski

Adamski chronology
Liveandirect (1989)	Doctor Adamski's Musical Pharmacy (1990)

Liveandirect is a live album and the first release by English acid house and rave producer Adamski. It was released in November 1989 by MCA Records. Having gained a following and positive reputation in the UK rave scene in the late 1980s where he made his name, Adamski signed to MCA and recorded Liveandirect at various raves, nightclubs and parties across the United Kingdom, as well as at Amnesia, Ibiza, in summer 1989. It has since been considered to be both the first live rave album and the first rave album overall. Employing acid house and techno styles, the music on the album is instrumental and was created using a Roland TR-909 drum machine and Ensoniq SQ-80 sequencer.

The album's release coincided with the release of his debut single "N-R-G", which reached number 12 on the UK Singles Chart. After the number-one success of Adamski's second single "Killer", the album itself peaked at number 47 in mid-1990, after originally peaking at number 65 in December 1989. A VHS release with the same name as the album was released in 1990 and contained the music videos for the aforementioned singles and live footage. The album received positive reviews from music critics, with some noting the stylistic variety. For the album's 20th anniversary in 2009, Adamski recorded a studio recreation of the album entitled Vile Acid Rent.

== Background ==
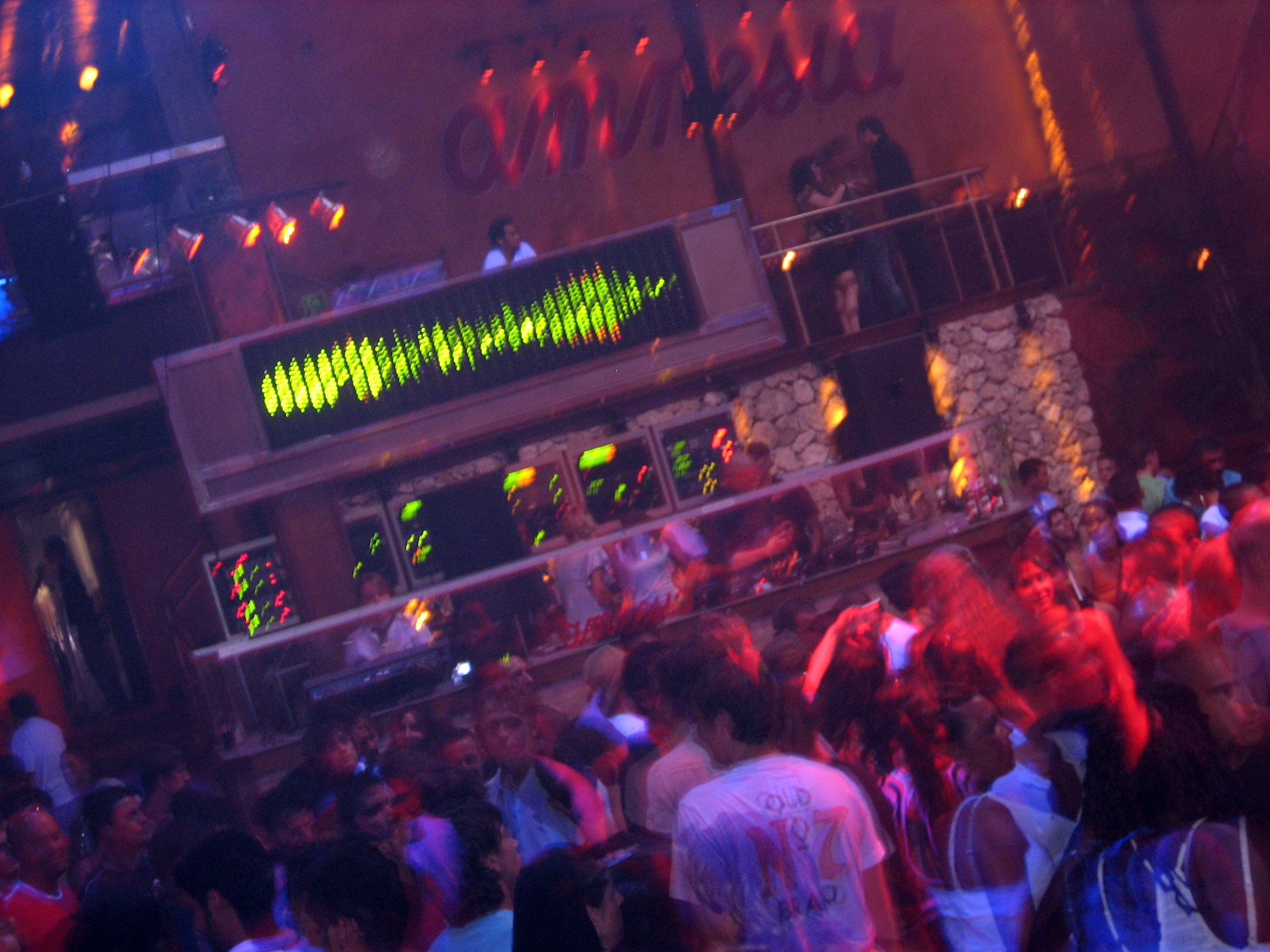
Amnesia, Ibiza (pictured 2006), where some of the album was recorded.

Adamski (born Adam Tinley) made his chart debut in the early 1980s with the adolescent-aged punk rock band The Stupid Babies, and later became a member of Diskord Datkord, a post-punk/hip hop fusion band, in the mid 1980s. He became interested in house music by the decade's end, and after meeting Chicago house pioneer Jimi Polo, who taught him the basics of using a music sequencer, he became acquainted with many major figures in house music, including Adonis and Marshall Jefferson. He visited Ibiza as his love for the house subgenre acid house grew, and as a self-employed keyboard player on the Enterprise Allowance Scheme, ultimately began playing live DJ sets at numerous raves and warehouse parties across London. The rave scene in London was new and flourishing fast, and he was catapulted into becoming one of the UK rave scene's leading names very quickly.

With Adamski having built up a reputation and following via his live work, he attracted the interest of major labels, subsequently signing to MCA Records with help from entrepreneur Paul Smith, who ran the Le Petit Prince restaurant in London. His debut album, Liveandirect is a live release of Adamski's work recorded in summer 1989 at various raves, nightclubs and parties in the United Kingdom as well as at Amnesia, Ibiza. DJ Mag described the album as "[cobbling] together bits and bobs of live recordings from raves." In his book Energy Flash, writer Simon Reynolds refers to Liveandirect as a "live house album."

== Composition ==
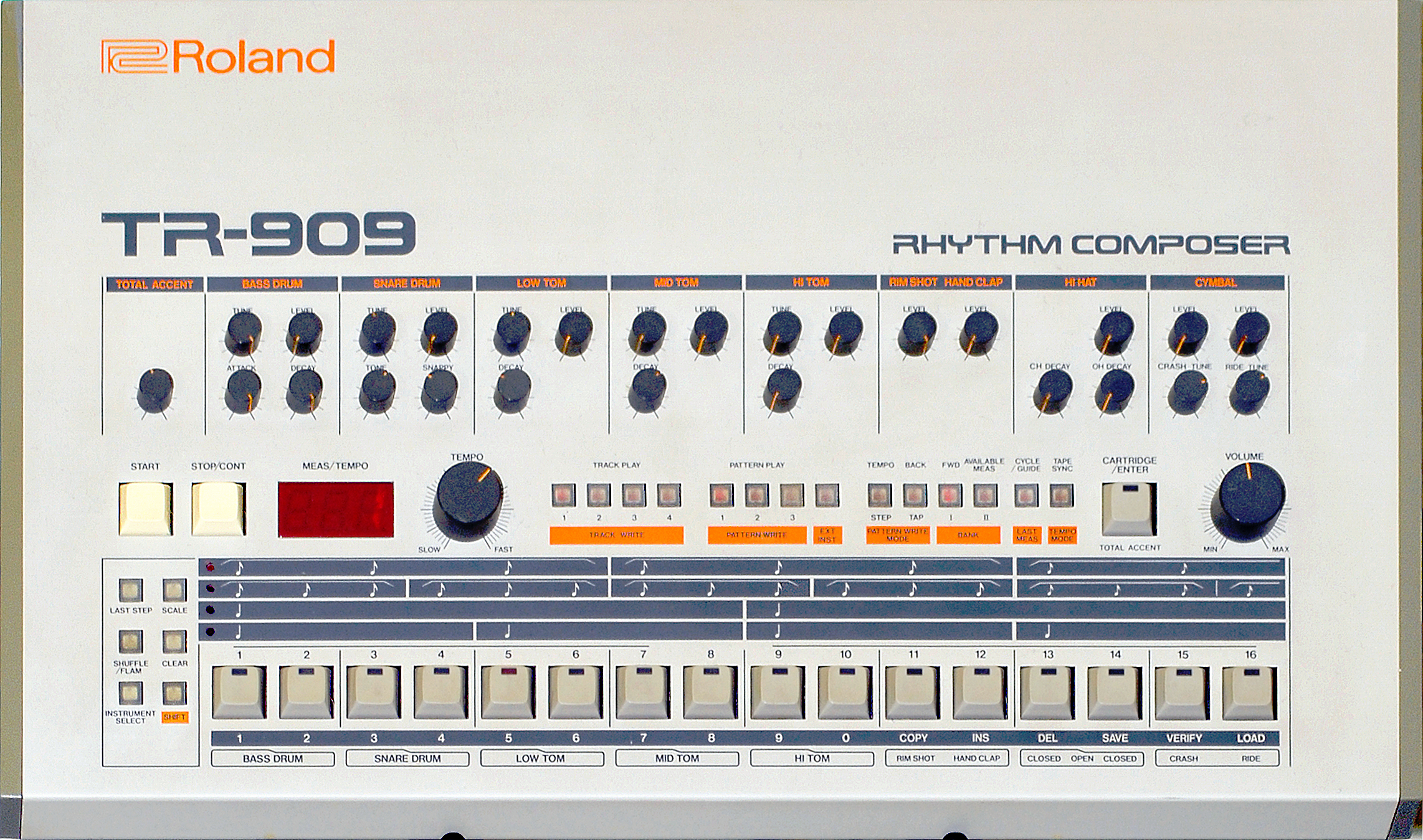
The album's percussive sounds come from a Roland TR-909.

Liveandirect takes 13 tracks recorded live from the aforementioned DJ sets that are accordingly mixed together. As Keyboard magazine wrote: "Each side of this instrumental LP is one continuous groove, with arrangement breaks between tunes but never a pause in the beat." Adamski described the music as "instrumental, techno-ish stuff." The material is predominated by four-on-the-floor bass drum with periodical breaks provided by solo synth riffs. Also conspicuous on the album is filter resonance and synthesised strings. Compared to other contemporary rave albums, Liveandirect was relatively slow; Adamski said that "the fastest thing [on the album] was only about 125bpm — and that actually felt fast!" A short version of Adamski's debut single, "N-R-G", opens the album. "I Dream of You" also appeared on a 4-track seven-inch single covermount into a 1989 issue of Record Mirror.

Throughout the album's material, Adamski uses his preferred live set-up of a Roland TR-909 for drum sounds and Ensoniq SQ-80 sequencer for the other instrumental sounds. Although the SQ-80's piano and strings sounds are factory presets, Adamski programmed the rest of the sounds in himself, contributing to a distinctive "Adamski sound" according to Simon Trask from Music Technology. Trusk cited "N-R-G", for instance, as the track's distinguished bass sound originated via "some tweaking of the filter cutoff and resonance on a brass sound." Working in short sequences, Adamski recorded all his keyboard parts onto the Ensoniq SQ-80's onboard sequencer in real time. He said: "The most energetic tracks are built over two-bar units. In general I use four bars, but I also like to append sequences so that I can have, for instance, an eight-bar strings sequence over a repeating bassline. The most I ever do is 16 bars." Although Adamski was in possession of a Casio FZ10M sampler, it is not used for rhythmic loops; it only surfaces sporadically on the album in a sparing fashion, namely with an "I love technology" sample and several percussion sounds taken from bhangra music. To ensure spontaneity while working with the TR-909 and SQ-80, he developed several of his own techniques, described by Trask as follows:

"In order to have spontaneity while working with a sequencer and a drum machine he's developed his own vocabulary of button-pushing and knob-twiddling which allows him to punch individual sequencer tracks in and out in real time, adjust volume levels, select new sequences and songs (he plays without any break between songs, like a DJ cutting from one record to another), select new drum patterns, cut the drum machine in and out (using the 909's main volume knob) and adjust individual drum parameters, select drum-machine patterns "on the fly", stop and start sequences midsong and use the start/stop buttons to create rhythmic stuttering effects. He'll also add a part live on the keyboard, or drop the sequence out altogether and play solo for a short while, then bring the same or another sequence in again, with or without the drums. All of which requires a great deal of concentration and manual dexterity. For Adamski his music only really takes shape when he performs it live, but he goes a step beyond traditional conceptions of what live performance is all about, drawing more on the way a DJ works the crowd."

== Release ==
Liveandirect was released by MCA Records in the United Kingdom on 27 November 1989. Also released that month was his debut single, "N-R-G", a "squiggly acid piano shuffler" which also featured in live form on Liveandirect. The track reached number 12 on the UK Singles Chart in January 1990. The album itself was released to modest success. It originally entered the UK Albums Chart in December 1989 at number 65, then returned to the chart in February 1990, now reaching a height of number 53, and then finally re-charting in May 1990 after the success of his number-one hit "Killer". This time, the album reached an overall peak at number 47. The website of Adamski's latter-day record label, ZTT Records, writes that Liveandirect sold well. "Killer" was added as a bonus track to the American edition, which was released on 10 July 1990 by MCA.

At the time of release, house and rave DJs and producers were referred to as "faceless" by the press due to their lack of public image. Adamski appeared onstage in raves and clubs without any lighting, and this "faceless" approach continued to the album artwork of Liveandirect, which does not feature any pictures. The album artwork was designed by The Thunder Jockeys. An Adamski performance at Brixton Academy, London, on 31 December 1989 was filmed as part of the TV documentary Dancing into the Nineties (Part 2). This footage, alongside the music videos for "N-R-G" and "Killer", were released by MCA as a 26-minute VHS release in 1990, also entitled Liveandirect.

== Reception and legacy ==
Professional ratings
Review scores
Source	Rating
AllMusic	4/5 stars

In a contemporary review of Liveandirect, Keyboard magazine were favourable, writing that: "[Adamski is] heavy on the filter resonance and string machine, and has no artistic pretensions whatever. Lots of variety, though, and some genuinely interesting two-bar patterns. A rave-up for the severely brain-damaged." Boys' Own magazine soon parodied Liveandirect with the name Liveandire, exemplifying the subsequent backlash against live rave acts from producers and other parties who promoted a return to pre-acid house clubbing. In a retrospective review, John Bush of AllMusic did feel that the album had "dated just as badly as its contemporaries," but nonetheless wrote that "Liveandirect is by no means the worst rave crossover LP released during the late '80s and early '90s." He rated the album four stars out of five and named it an "Album Pick".

Dazed Digital have since described Liveandirect as "the first rave album" and therefore also the first rave album released on MCA. Influential graffiti artist Xenz cited Liveandirect as an influence, saying: "Having spent most my childhood breakdancing to electro it was only natural that I gravitated to acid house. I loved how this album felt live and just has a different vibe and flow to other stuff at the time." To mark the 20th anniversary of Liveandirect, Adamski released a re-recording of the album entitled Vile Acid Rent (an anagram of the original title) on the Germanys Major label in summer 2009. Vile Acid Rent is not a live album but a studio creation, using the same original equipment, melodies and riffs as the original album in conjunction with a contemporary feel and modern software. The album also includes a mashed-up version of his 1999 club hit "One of the People" and a radical recreation of "Killer". Music News said that, "in spite of its nostalgic undertones," Vile Acid Rent "manages to sound as fresh as anything else that's out there now."

== Track listing ==
1. "N-R-G (Part 1 & 2)" – 3:09
2. "I Dream of You" – 2:05
3. "Tekno Krisna" – 2:16
4. "The Bassline Changed My Life" – 2:49
5. "In Your Face" – 2:54
6. "Magik Piano" – 3:12
7. "You. Me. House" – 2:16
8. "A Brand New World" – 2:51
9. "M25" – 3:19
10. "I Love Teknology (Part 1)" – 2:42
11. "Rap You in Sound" – 2:59
12. "Into Orbit" – 2:19
13. "Love and Live" – 2:42

US bonus track

14. "Killer" – 4:11

== Personnel ==
- Adamski – music
- The Thunder Jockeys – sleeve design

== Charts and certifications ==
=== Weekly charts ===
Chart (1990)	Peak position
UK Albums (Official Charts)	47

=== Certifications ===
Region	Certification	Certified units/sales
United Kingdom (BPI)	Silver	60,000^{^}
^{^} Shipments figures based on certification alone.
