= Killer (Adamski song) =

1990 single by Adamski

Single by Adamski

from the album Doctor Adamski's Musical Pharmacy
- B-side: "Bassline Changed My Life"; "I Dream of You"
- Released: 26 March 1990
- Recorded: 1989–1990
- Genre: Acid house; hi-NRG
- Length: 4:10 (album version); 3:46 (UK radio edit)
- Label: MCA
- Songwriters: Adamski; Seal
- Producer: Adamski

Adamski singles chronology
"N-R-G" (1990)	"Killer" (1990)	"The Space Jungle" (1990)

"Killer" is a song by British DJ and record producer Adamski. It was written by Adamski and British singer-songwriter Seal, who also provided vocals, although the original release is credited solely to Adamski. It was released in March 1990 by MCA Records as the first single from Adamski's second album, Doctor Adamski's Musical Pharmacy (1990).

Following its release, "Killer" reached number one on the UK Singles Chart, spending four weeks at the top in May and June 1990 and selling over 400,000 copies in the UK, earning it gold certification. It also reached number one in Belgium and Zimbabwe and number two in the Netherlands and West Germany. In the United States, it peaked at number 23 on the Billboard Dance Club Play chart.

The song's music video was directed by Don Searll. Melody Maker ranked "Killer" the ninth-best single of the year. In 1991, Seal re-recorded "Killer" for his debut studio album, Seal, produced by Trevor Horn. Seal's version reached number eight in the UK and number 100 on the US Billboard Hot 100.

== Background ==
Adamski recounted that Seal saw him perform in 1989 at an illegal rave at the Santa Pod Raceway. Seal afterwards handed a demo tape to Adamski's MC, Daddy Chester, with which both were impressed. Seal had previously been singing in blues bands but a year spent travelling in Asia had changed his view of life and he had since become involved in the rave scene.

Adamski and Seal later happened to meet on New Year's Eve 1989 at a club named Solaris in London, and Seal was invited to work on one of a number of pieces that Adamski was performing at that time. Adamski had an instrumental track he called "The Killer" because he felt that it sounded "like the soundtrack to a movie murder scene". According to Adamski, Seal's vocals were recorded against this track on 27 January 1990: coincidentally, the same day that 10,000 people gathered in Trafalgar Square (not far from the studio where they were working) for the Freedom to Party demonstration against a government crackdown on rave culture, which Adamski himself attended.

Musically, the song is characterized by a distinctive opening bassline and keyboard melody during the chorus. The track makes use of only two instruments – Ensoniq SQ80 Synthesizer and a Roland TR-909 drum machine – and occupied only eight tracks of a 48-track mixing console.

== Release ==
Both Adamski and Seal recalled that they were in financial trouble at the time of recording. Seal was almost penniless and was living in a squat. Although Adamski had his own following as a DJ and was enjoying success with his previous single "N-R-G", he was on the Enterprise Allowance Scheme which paid his rent and allowed him £40 a week. Both Adamski and Seal were struck by the popularity of "Killer" following its release on 26 March 1990. The song topped the UK Singles Chart and reached the top 10 in many European countries. Adamski recounted his surprise at people singing the memorable bassline to him in the street and, in particular, at hearing the track played at a wedding in a hotel at which he stayed following a performance in Cambridge. Seal recalled, "within a week, I went from being a relative nobody – this weird guy at raves, with silver bits in my hair – to a household name."

== Lyrics ==
Seal explained that the words he provided for "Killer" were intended as an exhortation to freedom and overcoming; that "the lyrics are about transcending whatever holds you back". The song's line "Racism in amongst future kids can only lead to no good, besides, all our sons and daughters already know how that feels" was re-used in Seal's 1991 song "Future Love Paradise". The introduction to the Seal version also contains the line "It's the loneliness that's the killer", which does not occur in the Adamski version.

== Critical reception ==
Upon the release, Bill Coleman from Billboard magazine found that this "enchanting techno-hip-house charmer from the keyboardist's Liveandirect project sports a languid vocal to complement the instrumentation." Dave Jennings from Melody Maker wrote, "This is much like it. "Killer" isn't the brutish thin its title suggests. It's a medium-paced dance track built around a rock-solid bassline, laced with eerie synthetics and topped with the plaintive voice of guest singer Seal — who sounds firmly in the grip of lovely desolution. "Killer" shifts more than enough to fit on the dancefloor, but it might also suit your mood if you have to go home alone when the club has closed. Emotive and effective." David Giles from Music Week called it a "strange release", adding, "It sounds as though a bluesy soul vocalist has become trapped inside a throbbing piece of machinery; it actually takes a fair while to warm up into the familiar pace of house rhythm." He also stated that "Adamski seems to be plotting a move towards the soul world but is still overawed by technology."

Ian McCann from NME declared it as "a perfect pop moment, if Adamski never makes another record half as good it will stand as a testament to its time like Bowie's, Numan's and Human League's best." Tom Doyle from Smash Hits remarked that the song is "a bit of surprise", complimenting Seal, "who turns in a fine soul-singing". He explained that the song "builds up from a slow Depeche Mode-sounding beginning into a full-blown "rave" record and then drops down for the moody bit again at the end. A complete success."

=== Retrospective response ===
In a retrospective review, John Bush from AllMusic stated that the songs like "Killer" "still have an inkling of the freshness they must have possessed back in 1989". In 2010, Tom Ewing of Freaky Trigger commented, "What was startling about the record in 1990—and what lets it keep its charge now—is that the music simply refuses to get out of Seal's way. In fact, if you only knew Seal from the rolling smoothness of his latterday career 'Killer' would come as a real shock: here he is, making his debut not as a highfalutin' loverman but as an isolated paranoid battling through a tangle of wires and buzz. Adamski is truly as much the star here, putting together a tense, crisp piece of house music which doesn't actually need his singer to be memorable (though surely needed him to reach number one)." In 2014, English DJ and producer Duke Dumont ranked it number seven in his list of "The 10 Best UK Number One Singles", saying, "I preferred Seal before he went all 'Kiss from a Rose'. This song is dramatic and operatic in its delivery – almost like the 'Bohemian Rhapsody' of UK dance music."

In 2020, The Guardian ranked "Killer" number 87 in their list of "The 100 Greatest UK No. 1s". They added, "Every part of Adamski’s production is perfectly designed: the sad chords, the funkily interrupted alien transmission of the synths, the prodding bassline with its edges almost imperceptibly corroded by acid. Most beautiful of all is Seal: half activist, half oracle." In December 1990, Melody Maker ranked it number nine in their list of "Singles of the Year", saying, "A superlative fusion single in a year in which the word 'fusion' was glibly overused. 'Killer' was 1990's postscript to Marvin Gaye's 'What's Goin' On?'. Adamski's low-key techno-dub proved the perfect backdrop for Seal's mournful vocals." In February 2022, Classic Pop ranked "Killer" number 11 in their list of the top 40 dance tracks from the 90's.

== Chart performance ==
"Killer" debuted within the UK Singles Chart top 40 at number 39 on 14 April 1990. Although the track was credited solely to Adamski by the Official Charts Company, various publications credited Seal's contribution to the song as a featured artist. It reached the top 10 during its fourth week on the chart before reaching number one on 12 May. After a four-week run at the top, the track fell one place to number two, being replaced in pole position by "World in Motion" by New Order. It spent 16 weeks in the top 40.

== Music video ==
The accompanying music video for "Killer" was directed by Don Searll.

== Track listings ==
7-inch, cassette, and mini-CD single
No.	Title	Length
1.	"Killer"	4:10
2.	"Bass Line Changed My Life"	3:53

UK 12-inch and CD single
No.	Title	Length
1.	"Killer"	5:35
2.	"Bass Line Changed My Life"	4:39
3.	"I Dream of You"	4:45

UK 12-inch remix single ("Killeremix")
No.	Title	Length
1.	"Killer" (remix)	6:27
2.	"Bassline Changed My Life"	4:50
3.	"The N-R-G Symphony in F. Minor"	8:27

US and Canadian 12-inch single
No.	Title	Length
1.	"Killer" (remix)	6:27
2.	"Killer"	5:35

US cassette remix single
No.	Title	Length
1.	"Killeremix"	6:27
2.	"Killer"	5:35
3.	"N.R.G." (12-inch mix)	6:22
4.	"The N.R.G. Symphony in F. Minor"	8:27

== Charts ==
=== Weekly charts ===
Chart (1990)	Peak position
Australia (ARIA)	112
Austria (Ö3 Austria Top 40)	11
Belgium (Ultratop 50 Flanders)	1
Europe (Eurochart Hot 100)	2
Finland (Suomen virallinen lista)	14
Ireland (IRMA)	5
Israel (Israeli Singles Chart)	10
Luxembourg (Radio Luxembourg)	3
Netherlands (Dutch Top 40)	2
Netherlands (Single Top 100)	2
New Zealand (Recorded Music NZ)	29
Spain (AFYVE)	15
Sweden (Sverigetopplistan)	5
Switzerland (Schweizer Hitparade)	15
UK Singles (Official Charts)	1
US Dance Club Play (Billboard)	23
West Germany (GfK)	2
Zimbabwe (ZIMA)	1

=== Year-end charts ===
Chart (1990)	Position
Belgium (Ultratop)	9
Europe (Eurochart Hot 100)	12
Germany (Media Control)	21
Netherlands (Dutch Top 40)	17
Netherlands (Single Top 100)	13
Sweden (Topplistan)	29
UK Singles (OCC)	5
UK Club Chart (Record Mirror)	75

== Certifications ==
Region	Certification	Certified units/sales
United Kingdom (BPI)	Gold	400,000^{^}
^{^} Shipments figures based on certification alone.

== Release history ==
Region	Date	Format(s)	Label(s)	Ref.
United Kingdom	26 March 1990	7-inch vinyl; 12-inch vinyl; CD; cassette	MCA	
Australia	7 May 1990	12-inch single	MCA	
Japan	25 July 1990	Mini-CD	MCA	

== Seal version ==
"Killer"
- 1991 7-inch UK single

Single by Seal

from the album Seal
- B-side: "Hey Joe" (live); "Come See What Love Has Done" (live)
- Released: 4 November 1991
- Length: 4:17 (radio version); 6:33 (single version); 6:21 (album version)
- Label: ZTT (1991); Warner Bros. (2005)
- Songwriters: Adamski; Seal
- Producer: Trevor Horn

Seal singles chronology
"The Beginning" (1991)	"Killer" (1991)	"Violet" (1992)
"Walk On By" (2004)	"Killer 2005" (2005)	"A Father's Way" (2006)

Music video
- "Killer" on YouTube

In 1991, Seal re-recorded "Killer" for his debut album, Seal (1991), produced by Trevor Horn. Seal's version, released in November 1991 by ZTT Records, reached number eight in the United Kingdom, number 100 on the US Billboard Hot 100, and number nine on the US Billboard Hot Dance Club Play chart with a remix by William Orbit.

The music video for Seal's version was produced and directed by Don Searll, and used computer-generated science-fiction themed imagery, largely built around a partial re-creation of the M. C. Escher print Another World. The song won British Video of the Year at the 1992 Brit Awards.

A new single release of "Killer", containing new remixes of both this and another Seal hit, "Crazy", was released in January 2005. This brought the single back to the Billboard Hot Dance Club Play chart, where it reached number one.

=== Track listing ===
- US maxi-single (1991)
1. "Killer" (single version)
2. "Killer" (William Orbit remix)
3. "Whirlpool" (live)
4. "Killer" (live)
5. "Come See What Love Has Done" (live)
6. "Hey Joe" (live) ("Billy Roberts" cover)
7. "Killer" (William Orbit dub)
- US maxi-single (2005)
1. "Killer" (Peter Rauhofer remix part one)
2. "Killer" (Peter Rauhofer remix part two)
3. "Killer" (Morel's Pink Noise vocal mix)
4. "Killer" (DJ Monk remix)
5. "Killer" (Jim Albert's Loneliness Is the Killer mix)
6. "Crazy" (Ananda Project vocal mix)
7. "Crazy" (Orange Factory mix)

=== Charts ===
Chart (1991–1992)	Peak position
Australia (ARIA)	95
Europe (European Dance Radio)	13
Europe (European Hit Radio)	21
Ireland (IRMA)	6
Luxembourg (Radio Luxembourg)	5
Netherlands (Single Top 100)	75
UK Singles (OCC)	8
UK Airplay (Music Week)	12
UK Dance (Music Week)	15
UK Club Chart (Record Mirror)	6
US Billboard Hot 100	100
US Dance Club Songs (Billboard)	9
US Hot Dance Music/Maxi-Singles Sales (Billboard)	14
US Cash Box Top 100	50

Chart (2005)	Peak position
US Dance Club Songs (Billboard) P. Rauhofer/Morel/DJ Monk/J. Albert mixes	1
US Hot Dance Singles Sales (Billboard)	3

== George Michael version ==
"Killer" / "Papa Was a Rollin' Stone"

Single by George Michael

from the EP Five Live
- Released: 17 May 1993
- Recorded: March 1991
- Venue: Wembley Arena (London)
- Length: 5:58 (full version); 4:15 (single version)
- Label: Hollywood (US); Parlophone (rest of the world)
- Songwriters: Adamski; Seal; Norman Whitfield; Barrett Strong
- Producer: George Michael

George Michael singles chronology
"Somebody to Love" (1993)	"Killer" / "Papa Was a Rollin' Stone" (1993)	"Jesus to a Child" (1996)

Music video
- "Killer" / "Papa Was a Rollin' Stone" on YouTube

In March 1991, English singer-songwriter George Michael performed "Killer" live at the Wembley Arena in a version that was released on the 1993 EP Five Live. "Papa Was a Rollin' Stone" was also recorded and released on the same album. The two songs were blended together in the live performance, then remixed several times. The P.M. Dawn extended and radio remix for the "Killer" / "Papa" combination was released in 1993. Michael released a video for the release, in which he did not appear personally. It was directed by German director Marcus Nispel.

=== Track listing ===
1. "Killer/Papa Was a Rollin' Stone" (English edit)
2. "Killer/Papa Was a Rollin' Stone" (Ligosa mix)
3. "Killer/Papa Was a Rollin' Stone" (P.M. Dawn remix)

=== Charts ===
Chart (1993)	Peak position
Canada Top Singles (RPM)	19
Iceland (Íslenski Listinn Topp 40)	4
UK Airplay (Music Week)	43
UK Dance (Music Week)	56
US Billboard Hot 100	69
US Hot Dance Club Songs (Billboard)	5
US Hot R&B/Hip-Hop Songs (Billboard)	88
US Maxi-Singles Sales (Billboard)	26
US Cash Box Top 100	77

== ATB version ==
"Killer 2000"

Single by ATB

from the album Movin' Melodies
- Released: 31 May 1999
- Length: 4:04
- Label: Kontor (Germany); Radikal (US)
- Songwriters: Adamski; Seal
- Producers: André Tanneberger; Woody van Eyden

ATB singles chronology
"Don't Stop!" (1999)	"Killer 2000" (1999)	"The Summer" (2000)

German DJ ATB recorded a version of "Killer" in 1999, released as a single on 31 May 1999 in Germany and on 19 September 2000 in the United States. Featuring vocals by Drue Williams, it was the producer's first fully vocal-based song under the ATB name. The song uses elements from both Adamski and Seal's versions, updated with more contemporary production techniques. The UK radio edit differs from others in that it includes ATB's signature guitar sound. This version of "Killer" peaked at number four on the UK Singles Chart and number 36 on the Billboard Hot Dance Club Play chart.

The song featured on the acclaimed 2000 mix album CreamLive.

=== Track listings ===
- "Killer" (Germany release)
1. "Killer" (video edit) – 4:08
2. "Killer" (radio edit) – 4:01
3. "Killer" (Killer mix) – 5:56
4. "Killer" (original mix) – 6:15
- "Killer" (US release)
1. "Killer" (UK radio edit) – 3:25
2. "Killer" (radio edit) – 4:00
3. "Killer" (2000) – 5:52
4. "Killer" (Trevor & Simon remix) – 6:50
5. "Killer" (Lost Witness remix) – 7:45
6. "Killer" (Joe Fandango remix) – 7:11
7. "Killer" (video edit) – 4:06
- "Killer" CD 1 (UK release)
1. "Killer" (UK radio edit) – 3:28
2. "Killer" (Lost Witness remix) – 7:48
3. "Killer" (Lock 'n Load remix) – 8:25
- "Killer" CD 2 (UK release)
1. "Killer" (Killer 2000 mix) – 5:55
2. "Killer" (Trevor Reilly & Simon Foy remix) – 6:52
3. "Killer" (Joe Fandango remix) – 7:11
- "Killer" (The Remixes) (Canada release)
1. "Killer" (UK radio edit) – 4:02
2. "Killer" (Joe Fandango remix) – 7:16
3. "Killer" (Lost Witness remix) – 7:49
4. "Killer" (Lock n' Load remix) – 8:29
5. "Killer" (Joe Fandango dub) – 5:27
6. "Killer" (Lost Witness dub) – 7:45
7. "Killer" (Trevor & Simon remix) – 8:57
8. "Killer" (Gareth Jones radio) – 3:20
- "Killer 2000" (Australia release)
1. "Killer 2000" (UK radio edit) – 3:26
2. "Killer 2000" (Killer 2000 mix) – 5:51
3. "Killer 2000" (Lost Witness vocal remix) – 7:45
4. "Killer 2000" (Lock 'n Load vocal remix) – 8:23
5. "Killer 2000" (Trevor & Simon remix) – 6:50
6. "Killer 2000" (Joe Fandango mix) – 7:11

=== Charts ===
==== Weekly charts ====
Weekly chart performance for the ATB version of "Killer"
Chart (1999–2000)	Peak position
Australia (ARIA)	33
Finland (Suomen virallinen lista)	16
Germany (Media Control)	31
Netherlands (Dutch Top 40)	22
Netherlands (Single Top 100)	25
Sweden (Sverigetopplistan)	24
UK Singles (OCC)	4
US Dance Club Play (Billboard)	36
US Maxi-Singles Sales (Billboard)	32

==== Year-end charts ====
Annual chart rankings for the ATB version
Chart (1999)	Position
Europe Border Breakers (Music & Media)	45
Netherlands (Dutch Top 40)	134
Romania (Romanian Top 100)	85

Chart (2000)	Position
UK Singles (OCC)	113

== Usage in media ==
An instrumental version of "Killer" was used as the Goal of the Tournament backing music for the BBC's Italia 90 coverage. It also featured in the 1991 Only Fools and Horses Christmas special, Miami Twice. It has also been used in video games DJ Hero 2 (as a remix by Tiësto) and Forza Horizon 3 (on the in-game radio station "Bass Arena"). A short fragment of the song was played in the first scene of the first episode of Bancroft. It was also used in a May 2018 episode of ITV soap opera Emmerdale, playing on the radio in Charity Dingle's car, and triggering memories of when she was raped at age 14 by Detective Inspector Mark Bails in 1990. Most recently, it has been used by BT in a 2018 advertising campaign.

The music video for the George Michael version of the song appeared in an episode of Beavis and Butthead, called "The Trial".

== Other versions ==
"Killer" has been recorded and performed by numerous other artists over the years.

- UK alternative rock band 2:54 used the song as a B-side to their 2012 vinyl single "Sugar".

== See also ==
- List of number-one dance singles of 2005 (U.S.)
