= Party Time? =

EP by Kurtis Blow
- Released: 1983
- Recorded: 1982
- Genres: Old school hip-hop, political hip-hop, go-go
- Length: 27:35
- Label: Mercury
- Producer: Kurtis Blow

Kurtis Blow chronology
Tough (1982)	Party Time? (1983)	The Best Rapper on the Scene (1983)

Singles from Party Time?
- 1. "Party Time?" Released: 1983; 2. "Nervous" Released: 1983

Professional ratings
Review scores
Source	Rating
AllMusic	4.5/5 stars
Christgau's Record Guide	A−

Party Time? is an EP by rapper Kurtis Blow, released in 1983 on Mercury Records. The title track and the song "Got to Dance" were both party-themed, but the other songs struck a sociopolitical tone.

The EP reached No. 36 on the R&B charts.

== Track listing ==
1. "Party Time" 9:30
2. "Big Time Hood" 3:14
3. "Nervous" 5:23
4. "Got to Dance" 4:17
5. "One-Two-Five (Main Street, Harlem, USA)" 5:11
