= The Best Rapper on the Scene =

Compilation album by Kurtis Blow
- Released: 1983
- Genre: Hip-hop
- Length: 51:54
- Label: Mercury

Kurtis Blow chronology
Party Time? (1982)	The Best Rapper on the Scene (1983)	Ego Trip (1984)

The Best Rapper on the Scene is a compilation album by rapper Kurtis Blow, released in 1983 on Mercury Records. The entire album consisted of material from his EP Party Time? and his 1982 album Tough. Even though none of the material is new, the album was marketed as an album (This may have been because Tough was initially classified as an EP). Even the artwork is not completely original, as the picture of Blow was taken from the front cover of Tough.

== Track listing ==
All songs were written by James B. Moore

1. "Party Time"^{b}
2. "Big Time Hood"^{b}
3. "Got to Dance"^{b} 4:17
4. "One-Two-Five (Main Street, Harlem, USA)"^{b}
5. "Tough"^{a} 5:50
6. "Juice"^{a} 6:15
7. "Boogie Blues"^{a} 5:26
8. "Baby You've Got to Go"^{a} 3:12

a- Indicates material from Tough. b- Indicates material from Party Time?
