= N-R-G =

1990 single by Adamski

Single by Adamski

from the album Liveandirect
- B-side: "I Love Teknology"
- Released: 8 January 1990
- Recorded: 1989
- Length: 3:44
- Label: MCA
- Producer: Adamski

Adamski singles chronology
"N-R-G" (1990)	"Killer" (1990)

"N-R-G" is the debut single by British acid house DJ and producer Adamski, released in early 1990 by MCA Records. The song charted well in both the UK and US, peaking at No. 12 on the UK Singles Chart on 27 January 1990, and at No. 13 on the Billboard Hot Dance Club Play chart in May 1990. The song first appeared on his 1989 live album Liveandirect, then as an extended version on his debut studio album Doctor Adamski's Musical Pharmacy the following year.

The single's cover featured a mocked up Lucozade bottle with the name "Lucozade" replaced with "Adamski", and the word "Energy" replaced with "N-R-G". The company had threatened to sue due to the use of the bottle without permission.

== Charts ==
=== Weekly charts ===
Chart (1990)	Peak position
UK Singles (OCC)	12
US Dance Club Songs (Billboard)	13

=== Year-end charts ===
Chart (1990)	Position
UK Club Chart (Record Mirror)	45
