= Tough (Kurtis Blow album) =

Studio album by Kurtis Blow
- Released: 1982
- Studio: Greene Street (New York)
- Genre: Rap
- Length: 26:16
- Label: Mercury; PolyGram
- Producer: James B. Moore; Robert Ford Jr.

Kurtis Blow chronology
Deuce (1981)	Tough (1982)	Party Time? (1983)

Singles from Tough
- 1. "Tough" Released: 1982

Tough is the third studio album by the American rapper Kurtis Blow, released in 1982 through Mercury Records. The recording sessions took place at Greene St. Recording in New York. The album was produced by James B. Moore and Robert Ford Jr.

The album peaked at number 167 on the Billboard 200 and number 38 on the Top R&B/Hip-Hop Albums in the United States. Its lead single "Tough" made it to number 37 on the Hot R&B/Hip-Hop Songs.

== Critical reception ==
Professional ratings
Review scores
Source	Rating
Christgau's Record Guide: The '80s	B
Rolling Stone	3/5 stars
The Rolling Stone Album Guide	2/5 stars

The New York Times wrote that "though 'Tough' stops short of rage, it nevertheless describes the consequences of unemployment on male self-esteem in devastating detail". Music critic Carl Cooper placed Tough on his ballot for the 1982 Village Voice Pazz and Jop poll.

== Track listing ==
No.	Title	Writer(s)	Length
1.	"Tough"	James B. Moore; Robert Ford Jr.; Lawrence Smith; Russell Simmons	6:50
2.	"Juice"	Kurtis Walker; Moore; Ford Jr.	6:15
3.	"Daydreamin'"	Walker; Moore; Smith; Orin Jones	4:25
4.	"Boogie Blues"	Moore	5:26
5.	"Baby You've Got to Go"	Moore; Ford Jr.	3:12

== Personnel ==
- Kurtis Walker – vocals, timbales
- James B. Moore – guitar, producer
- David Reeves – guitar
- Dean Bailin – guitar
- Robbie Kondor – piano
- Jeff Bova – synthesizer
- Lawrence Smith – bass
- Seth Glassman – bass
- Jimmy Bralower – drums
- Trevor Gale – drums
- Sam Jacobs – percussion
- Brian Brake – cymbal
- Robert Ford Jr. – producer
- Rod Hui – recording, mixing
- Howie Weinberg – mastering
- Bob Heimall Inc. – art direction
- Mo Ström – design
- Lloyd Nelson – cover photo

== Charts ==
Chart (1982)	Peak position
US Billboard 200	167
US Top R&B/Hip-Hop Albums (Billboard)	38
