= America (Kurtis Blow album) =

Studio album by Kurtis Blow
- Released: October 1985
- Genre: Hip-hop
- Length: 49:00
- Label: Mercury
- Producer: Kurtis Blow

Kurtis Blow chronology
Ego Trip (1984)	America (1985)	Kingdom Blow (1986)

Singles from America
- 1. "America" Released: 1985; 2. "If I Ruled the World" Released: November 9, 1985

Professional ratings
Review scores
Source	Rating
AllMusic	3/5 stars
Christgau's Record Guide	B

America is the fifth album by rapper Kurtis Blow, released in 1985 on Mercury Records. The album includes the song "If I Ruled the World" from the film Krush Groove, Blow's biggest hit since "The Breaks" and one of the last of his musical career. The album was the first album Kurtis Blow produced in a new deal with PolyGram Records that gave Kurtis the title Hip Hop's First Millionaire. The album was released in an era when old school hip-hop was being overtaken by a harder sound and attitude. The album includes the first sample loop that revolutionized the music industry. The single, "If I Ruled the World", reached number 24 in the UK Singles Chart in January 1986.

== Track listing ==
1. "America (Vocal)" (Kurtis Blow) – 6:17
2. "America (Dub Mix)" (Blow) – 2:42
3. "Super Sperm" (Blow) – 1:16
4. "AJ Meets Davy DMX" (Blow, David Reeves) – 6:37
5. "Hello Baby" (Blow, Reeves) – 6:42
6. "If I Ruled the World" (Blow, Reeves, Aaron O'Bryant) – 7:10
7. "Respect to the King"(Blow, Delaney McGill) – 1:57
8. "AJ Is Cool" (Blow, Reeves) – 5:51
9. "Summertime Groove" (Blow, Danny Harris, Robert Robertson) – 5:44
10. "MC Lullaby" (Blow) – :28
11. "Don't Cha Feel Like Making Love" (Anthony Foster, Daniel Harris) – 4:16

== Charts ==
=== Weekly charts ===
Chart (1985–1986)	Peak position
US Billboard 200	153
US Top R&B/Hip-Hop Albums (Billboard)	18

=== Year-end charts ===
Chart (1986)	Position
US Top R&B/Hip-Hop Albums (Billboard)	45
