= Naughty (Adamski album) =

Studio album by Adamski
- Released: 21 April 1992
- Studios: Matrix 2; Real World Studios, Box, Wiltshire; Advision Studios, London
- Label: MCA
- Producer: Adamski

Adamski chronology
Doctor Adamski's Musical Pharmacy (1990)	Naughty (1992)	Adamski's Thing (1998)

Professional ratings
Review scores
Source	Rating
AllMusic	2/5 stars

Naughty is the second studio album, third album overall, by English acid house DJ and record producer Adamski, released in 1992 on MCA Records. It includes the single "Never Goin' Down!", featuring Jimi Polo, which was backed as a double A-side with "Born to Be Alive!", featuring Soho (No. 51 in the UK Singles Chart), plus the singles "Get Your Body!", featuring Nina Hagen (UK No. 68), and "Back to Front" (UK No. 63).

== Track listing ==
All tracks written by Adamski, except where noted.

No.	Title	Writer(s)	Length
1.	"Seq. Rok."		2:26
2.	"Born to Be Alive!"		5:08
3.	"Back to Front"	Adamski; PIL	4:19
4.	"The Sky Is Falling"		5:16
5.	"Get Your Body!"	Adamski; Nina Hagen	6:52
6.	"Time Capsule"		5:34
7.	"Hard Drugs, Soft Flesh"		4:19
8.	"Never Goin' Down!"	Adamski; Jimi Polo	4:55
9.	"Newsflash"		6:05
10.	"Head-On-Collision-Ism"		6:10
11.	"Take the Money 'N' Run"		3:45

Note

- "Never Goin' Down!" incorporates parts of the Adamski track "Future Freak", from the album Doctor Adamski's Musical Pharmacy.

== Personnel ==
Adapted from the album's liner notes.

- Adamski – vocals, guitar, pots & pans, programming, synthesizer ("all thynthathitherth")
- Marc Auerbach – additional programming
- Bibby Rankin – drums (track 11)
- Arthur Bumble & Deptford Dave (Dave Pine) – additional programming
- Allan Dias – guitar
- Nina Hagen – vocals (track 5)
- Danny Hyde – additional programming
- Lee – spoken words (track 10)
- Natali – vocals (track 6)
- Nellie the Elephant – bass
- Jimi Polo – vocals (track 8), piano (track 9)
- Ricardo – rapping (tracks 3 & 6)
- Guy Sigsworth – additional programming
- Jonny Slut – chorus vocals (track 11)
- Soho – vocals (track 2)
- Charlie Spliff – bass guitar
- Mark Tinley – guitar, additional programming
- Youth – bass guitar (track 4)
- Strings contracted by Audrey Riley
- Produced by Adamski
- Engineered by Danny Hyde and Deptford Dave (Dave Pine)
- Mixed by Adamski and Mike "Spike" Drake
- Cover by Andrew Sutton
- Photography by Simon Fowler

== Charts ==
Chart performance for Naughty
Chart (1992)	Peak position
Australian Albums (ARIA)	186
