= Full Force (Full Force album) =

Studio album by Full Force
- Released: 1985
- Genre: R&B
- Length: 1:09:44
- Label: Columbia
- Producer: Full Force; J. B. Moore; Robert Ford Jr.

Full Force chronology
Full Force (1985)	Full Force Get Busy 1 Time! (1986)

Singles from Full Force
- 1. "Girl If You Take Me Home" Released: 1985; 2. "Alice, I Want You Just for Me!" Released: 1985; 3. "Unselfish Lover" Released: 1986

Professional ratings
Review scores
Source	Rating
AllMusic	2.5/5 stars
The Village Voice	B−

Full Force is the debut studio album by American R&B group Full Force. It was released in 1985 through Columbia Records. Produced by Full Force, J. B. Moore and Robert Ford Jr., it features contributions from Howie Tee, Lisa Lisa and Cult Jam, The Real Roxanne and UTFO. The album peaked at number 160 on the Billboard 200 and number 29 on the Top R&B/Hip-Hop Albums charts in the United States and number 36 on the Dutch Album Top 100 chart.

== Track listing ==
All tracks are written by Paul Anthony George, Lucien J. George, Curtis T. Bedeau, Hugh Clarke, Brian George and Gerard R. Charles, except track 1 is written with Howard Thompson.

No.	Title	Length
1.	"Alice, I Want You Just for Me!"	6:14
2.	"Unselfish Lover"	5:30
3.	"Please Stay"	4:34
4.	"United"	6:37
5.	"Girl If You Take Me Home"	5:44
6.	"The Dream Believer"	4:28
7.	"Half a Chance"	4:40
8.	"The Man Upstairs"	3:45
9.	"Let's Dance Against the Wall"	3:41

2010 reissue bonus tracks
No.	Title	Length
10.	"Alice (Bang Zoom)"	5:55
11.	"Girl" (Funky Fresh Def Mix)	5:45
12.	"So Unselfish (It's Okay, It's Okay)"	6:51
13.	"Let's Dance Against the Wall" (12" Mix)	6:00
Total length:		1:09:44

== Personnel ==
- Full Force – backing vocals, producers, arrangement, mixing
  - Paul Anthony George – lead vocals
  - Lucien "Bow-Legged Lou" George – lead vocals
  - Curtis "Curt-T-T" Bedeau – guitar, drum programming
  - Hugh "Junior Shy-Shy" Clarke – bass
  - Brian "B-Fine" George – keyboards, drums, drum programming
  - Gerard "Gerry" Charles – keyboards, synthesizer programming, drum programming
- Lisa Velez – additional backing vocals (tracks: 4, 5, 8, 9)
- Adelaida "The Real Roxanne" Martinez – rap vocals (track 4)
- U.T.F.O. – rap vocals (track 4)
- Robert Ford III – laughter (track 8)
- Howard "Howie Tee" Thompson – scratches (tracks: 1, 4, 9), additional drum programming
- Alexander "Spanador" Mosely – guitar solo (track 4)
- Mike Hughes – timbales (track 4)
- Maurice "Mixmaster Ice" Bailey – scratches (track 4)
- James Biggs Moore III – synthesizer programming, producer
- Robert Ford Jr. – producer
- David Dachinger – recording (track 3)
- Scott Litt – recording (track 7)
- Jeff Hendrickson – recording (track 8)
- Bob Rosa – recording (track 9)
- Peter Robbins – recording (track 9)
- Questar Welsh – mixing (tracks: 1–6, 9), engineering
- Larry Alexander – mixing (track 7)
- Malcolm Pollack – mixing (track 8)
- Glenn Rosenstein – remixing (track 4)
- Howie Weinberg – mastering
- Cecil Holmes – executive producer

== Charts ==
=== Weekly charts ===
Chart (1986)	Peak position
Dutch Albums (Album Top 100)	36
US Billboard 200	160
US Top R&B/Hip-Hop Albums (Billboard)	29

=== Year-end charts ===
Chart (1986)	Position
US Top R&B/Hip-Hop Albums (Billboard)	47

=== Singles ===
Year	Single	US Dance	US R&B
1985	"Alice, I Want You Just for Me!"	34	16
1985	"Girl If You Take Me Home"	32	79
1986	"Unselfish Lover"	—	34
