= Full Force Get Busy 1 Time! =

1986 album by Full Force

Studio album by Full Force
- Released: 1986
- Recorded: 1986
- Genre: R&B
- Label: Columbia
- Producers: Full Force, J.B. Moore, Robert Ford Jr.

Full Force chronology
Full Force (1985)	Full Force Get Busy 1 Time! (1986)	Guess Who's Comin' to the Crib? (1987)

Professional ratings
Review scores
Source	Rating
Allmusic	3.5/5 stars

Full Force Get Busy 1 Time! is the second album by the Brooklyn, New York-based R&B group Full Force. Released in 1986, the album includes one of Full Force's biggest hits with "Temporary Love Thing", which nearly made the R&B top 10, as well as the minor follow-up hits, "Unfaithful" and "Old Flames Never Die".

== Track listing ==
1. "Temporary Love Thing" (5:35)
2. "Unfaithful" (5:49)
3. "Never Had Another Lover" (4:37)
4. "Old Flames Never Die" (4:56)
5. "Child's Play (Part 1)" (0:53)
6. "So Much" (5:17)
7. "Chain Me to the Night" (4:42)
8. "Body Heavenly" (5:16)
9. "Love Scene" (4:52)
10. "Child's Play (Part 2)" (0:44)
- All songs written, arranged, and performed by Full Force.

== Personnel ==
=== Full Force ===
- "Lead choice voices": Paul Anthony and Bow-Legged Lou
- Drum, programming, percussion master, "occasional hogging of lead vocals": B-Fine
- Ebony and Ivory keyboards: Baby Gerry
- Slick lick leading guitar: Curt-t-t
- Atlanta June bass geetar: Shy Shy
- Background vocal chords: All members of Full Force

=== "Extra added attractions" ===
- Hitman Howie Tee - additional drum programming; turntable scratching on "Unfaithful", "Never Had Another Lover", "So Much" and "Chain Me to the Night"
- Lisa Lisa - female vocals on "Love Scene"
- Ron Brown - voiced guitar on "So Much" and "Old Flames Never Die"

== Charts ==
Chart (1986)	Peak positions
Billboard 200	156
Billboard Top R&B Albums	19

=== Singles ===
Year	Single	US R&B	US Dance
1986	"Temporary Love Thing"	12	—
1986	"Unfaithful"	20	16
1987	"Old Flames Never Die"	27	44
