= The Space Jungle =

1990 song by Adamski

Single by Adamski

from the album Doctor Adamski's Musical Pharmacy
- B-side: "The 2nd Coming"
- Released: 28 August 1990
- Length: 6:24
- Label: MCA
- Songwriters: Adamski; Elvis Presley; Otis Blackwell
- Producers: Adamski; Mark Tinley

Adamski singles chronology
"Killer" (1990)	"The Space Jungle" (1990)	"Flashback Jack" (1990)

"The Space Jungle" is a song by English acid house DJ and producer Adamski. The song is effectively a cover of "All Shook Up" by Elvis Presley, and features additional rap vocals by Ricardo da Force. The song was a top 30 hit in several countries in Europe and also in New Zealand, with its biggest success in Finland and the UK, peaking at numbers 6 and 7, respectively. It also charted in the US, reaching No. 8 on the Billboard Dance Club Songs chart.

== Charts ==
Chart (1990)	Peak position
Belgium (Ultratop 50 Flanders)	24
Europe (Eurochart Hot 100)	26
Finland (Suomen virallinen lista)	6
Ireland (IRMA)	13
Luxembourg (Radio Luxembourg)	3
Netherlands (Dutch Top 40)	21
Netherlands (Single Top 100)	20
New Zealand (Recorded Music NZ)	21
Switzerland (Schweizer Hitparade)	25
UK Singles (OCC)	7
US Dance Club Songs (Billboard)	8
