= Robert Ford Jr. =

American journalist and record producer (1949–2020)

- Ford in 1999
- Born: June 30, 1949; New York City, U.S.
- Died: May 19, 2020 (aged 70); New York City, U.S.
- Other names: Rocky
- Occupations: Journalist; record producer
- Known for: Writing the first article about hip-hop in a major publication

Robert "Rocky" Ford Jr. (June 30, 1949 – May 19, 2020) was an American journalist and record producer. While working for Billboard in 1978, Ford wrote the first article about hip-hop to appear in any major publication. He went on to produce albums and write songs for acts including Kurtis Blow, Rodney Dangerfield, and Full Force, and has been recognized as having played "a crucial role in early commercial hip-hop". Ford has been credited as a mentor by entrepreneur Russell Simmons.

== Early life ==
Robert Ford Jr. was born in Harlem, Manhattan, on June 30, 1949. His parents would play blues, jazz, and R&B records around the house while he was growing up. His family later moved to St. Albans, Queens, and he became friends with Larry Smith while attending Andrew Jackson High School there. After graduating, he briefly attended Queensborough Community College.

== Journalism ==
Ford began his career in journalism working as production manager for Forbes and Billboard. He then became a journalist for the latter magazine, primarily writing about disco. In 1978, Ford traveled to the Bronx to figure out why certain obscure R&B records were suddenly in high demand at a popular record store in the area. He met with DJ Kool Herc and learned that DJs were buying up these records in order to play short drum breaks in the songs on repeat at parties. On July 1 of that year, Billboard ran his article about the trip, titled "B-Beats Bombarding Bronx: Mobile DJ Starts Something With Oldie R&B Disks", which is now widely considered to be the first article about hip-hop in a major publication. In May 1979, Ford published "Jive Talking N.Y. DJs Rapping Away in Black Discos", which focused on DJs like Eddie Cheeba, DJ Hollywood, Kurtis Blow, and Lovebug Starski that rapped while spinning records.

It was also in the late 1970s that Ford helped then-aspiring writer Nelson George get an internship at Billboard.

== Songwriting and record production ==
Ford left Billboard in 1979 to concentrate on writing and producing the song "Christmas Rappin'" with former co-worker J.B. Moore. The duo gave the song to rapper Kurtis Blow, who Ford met while working on his "Jive Talking N.Y. DJs..." article. The song was released by Mercury Records in December 1979 to wide success, causing Blow to sign a deal with the label. Also in 1979, Ford met rapper Joseph Simmons (later known as Run of Run-DMC), who then introduced him to his older brother Russell Simmons. Ford began taking Russell to industry events, encouraged him to become a record producer, and encouraged Blow to hire Russell as a manager. Ford, Moore, Smith, and Russell Simmons co-produced Blow's followup song, "The Breaks", which became the first hip-hop single to be certified gold by the RIAA.

In the late 1980s, Ford became vice president of Rush Communications. He later founded his own management company that helped launch R&B group Hi-Five.

== Personal life ==
Ford married Linda Medley in 1998. Ford had a son, sportscaster Robert Ford III, in 1979 and a daughter, the artist Raque Ford, in 1986.

== Death and legacy ==
Ford died in Brooklyn on May 19, 2020. He received obituaries in The New York Times, Pitchfork, and Billboard, with the latter publishing multiple retrospectives on his reporting. Blow said about Ford: "He taught me how to be a man. I was very shy; he brought me out of that and turned me into this incredible performer"; Russell Simmons said that Ford "taught [him] the value of selling the truth".

== Selected production discography ==
- Deuce (1981) – Kurtis Blow
- Rappin' Rodney (1983) – Rodney Dangerfield
- Ego Trip (1984) – Kurtis Blow
- Full Force (1985) – Full Force
- Full Force Get Busy 1 Time! (1986) – Full Force
