= Kingdom Blow =

Studio album by Kurtis Blow
- Released: 1986
- Genre: Hip-hop
- Length: 42:11
- Label: Mercury
- Producer: Kurtis Blow

Kurtis Blow chronology
America (1985)	Kingdom Blow (1986)	Back by Popular Demand (1988)

Singles from Kingdom Blow
- 1. "I'm Chillin'" Released: 1986; 2. "The Bronx" Released: 1986

Kingdom Blow is the sixth studio album by the American hip-hop musician Kurtis Blow, released in 1986.

The album peaked at No. 196 on the Billboard 200.

== Production ==
The album was produced by Kurtis Blow. It contains a few guest appearances. Bob Dylan raps on "Street Rock". He performed his lines in one take, at his Malibu home. Robert Reed, of Trouble Funk, appears on "I'm Chillin", which was released as a single. George Clinton appears on "Magilla Gorilla".

== Critical reception ==
Professional ratings
Review scores
Source	Rating
AllMusic	2/5 stars
The Encyclopedia of Popular Music	2/5 stars
The Philadelphia Inquirer	2/4 stars
The Rolling Stone Album Guide	2/5 stars

Opining that Blow "is nothing if not open-minded and adventurous," Trouser Press wrote that "the eight long cuts, some more compelling than others, throw in just about everything (TV bites, Donald Duck, party sounds, Emulator gimmickry, etc.)." The Philadelphia Inquirer thought that "the one stand-out song is already looking like a left-field pop hit: 'I'm Chillin' ', which combines a clever rap with the funky go-go music of the Washington band Trouble Funk."

== Track listing ==
No.	Title	Length
1.	"Street Rock"	8:58
2.	"The Bronx"	3:50
3.	"Unity Party Jam"	4:18
4.	"Sunshine"	4:10
5.	"Magilla Gorilla"	5:39
6.	"I'm Chillin'"	5:29
7.	"Kingdom Blow"	4:06
8.	"Reasons for Wanting You"	5:41
