= The Breaks (song) =

1980 single by Kurtis Blow

- 12" single cover

Single by Kurtis Blow

from the album Kurtis Blow
- B-side: "The Breaks" (Instrumental/Do It Yourself)
- Released: June 14, 1980
- Recorded: 1980
- Genre: Old-school hip-hop; disco; funk
- Length: 7:43 (album and 12" version); 5:52 (12" instrumental version); 4:05 (7" version)
- Label: Mercury
- Songwriters: Kurtis Blow; Robert Ford Jr.; James B. Moore; Russell Simmons; Larry Smith
- Producers: J.B. Moore; Robert Ford Jr.

Kurtis Blow singles chronology
| "Christmas Rappin'" (1979) | "The Breaks" (1980) | "Hard Times" (1981) |

"The Breaks" is a song by American rapper Kurtis Blow from his self-titled debut album. It was released as a single in June 1980 and peaked at No. 87 on the Billboard Hot 100. It was the first certified gold rap song, and the second certified gold 12-inch single. In 2008, the song ranked #10 on VH1's 100 Greatest Hip-Hop Songs.

== Lyrics and structure ==
"The Breaks" repeats the word "break" (or any of its homophones) 84 times over six and a half minutes. It features six breakdowns (seven including the outro) while there are three definitions for "break," "to break" or "brakes" used in the lyrics. Unlike most hip-hop songs, which sample prerecorded funk, the funk beat in this song is original (contrary to suggestions that it sampled "Long Train Runnin'" by the Doobie Brothers).

== Chart performance ==
The single hit No. 87 on the U.S. Billboard Hot 100, No. 4 on the U.S. Billboard R&B chart, and No. 9 on the U.S. Billboard Dance chart.

| Chart (1980) | Peak position |
|---|---|
| UK Singles (The Official Charts Company) | 47 |
| US Billboard Hot 100 | 87 |
| US Billboard National Disco Top 100 | 9 |
| US Billboard Hot Soul Singles | 4 |

== Certifications ==
It sold one million copies, becoming the first rap song to earn a gold certification from the RIAA and the second 12-inch single to earn a gold certification, following "No More Tears (Enough Is Enough)" by Barbra Streisand and Donna Summer.

== Media ==
The song has featured in several video games: the 2002 game Grand Theft Auto: Vice City on the fictional in-game radio station "Wildstyle", the 2005 game True Crime: New York City, the 2006 game Scarface: The World Is Yours and the 2011 Kinect game Dance Central 2.

It was also featured in a 2019 episode of American Dad!, when Jeff Fischer starts the engine at the Edibles room.

== Samples ==
It has been sampled by others, including the background beat being used in Organized Rhyme's song "Check the O.R." and the 2005 reggaeton single, "Chacarron Macarron" by El Chombo.

Female rap group Nadanuf remade the song alongside Kurtis Blow on their 1997 album Worldwide. Blow re-recorded the song on the album Tricka Technology by A Skillz and Krafty Kuts.

H.O.T's Tony Ahn rapped portions of "The Breaks" as an uncredited vocal for the intro of S.E.S.'s "I'm Your Girl".

== Certifications ==
| Region | Certification | Certified units/sales |
|---|---|---|
| United States (RIAA) | Gold | 1,000,000^{^} |
^{^} Shipments figures based on certification alone.
