= Back by Popular Demand =

Studio album by Kurtis Blow
- Released: 1988
- Genre: Rap
- Length: 44:32
- Label: Mercury

Kurtis Blow chronology
Kingdom Blow (1986)	Back by Popular Demand (1988)	The Best of Kurtis Blow (1994)

Back by Popular Demand is the seventh and final studio album by the American rapper Kurtis Blow, released in 1988.

The album peaked at No. 84 on Billboard's Top Black Albums.

== Production ==
Blow sang on the remake of Charles Wright & the Watts 103rd Street Rhythm Band's "Express Yourself". Salaam Remi helped to produce a few tracks on the album.

== Critical reception ==
Professional ratings
Review scores
Source	Rating
AllMusic	1.5/5 stars
The Encyclopedia of Popular Music	2/5 stars
Orlando Sentinel	2/5 stars
The Rolling Stone Album Guide	2/5 stars

Trouser Press wrote that the album "finds the venerable but passé rapper in an understandably insecure mood, circling his wagons in a vain attempt to get with the new hip-hop generation." The Orlando Sentinel opined that "by the time Blow gets through the first side of the LP, he's delivered three songs that do little more than brag that he's the greatest rapper since the dawn of time, etc ... Yawn."

The Omaha World-Herald praised the album's "melodic tunes": "Express Yourself", "Love Don't Love Nobody", "Feeling Good", and "Blue Iguana".

AllMusic wrote: "The first track and initial single has Blow putting himself on the ropes and the defensive as he proclaims his return, but he never really went anywhere. The song, like the majority of this effort, employs a harder, James Brown sample-laden sound." MusicHound R&B: The Essential Album Guide deemed the album "stale-sounding."

== Track listing ==
No.	Title	Length
1.	"Back by Popular Demand"	5:25
2.	"Only the Strong Survive"	6:01
3.	"I'm True to This"	3:25
4.	"Get On Up"	2:23
5.	"Suckers in the Place"	4:41
6.	"Love Don't Love Nobody"	4:08
7.	"Still on the Scene"	4:32
8.	"Express Yourself"	3:50
9.	"Blue Iguana"	3:57
10.	"I'm Feelin' Good"	6:10
