= Adamski =

English DJ, musician, and record producer (born 1967)

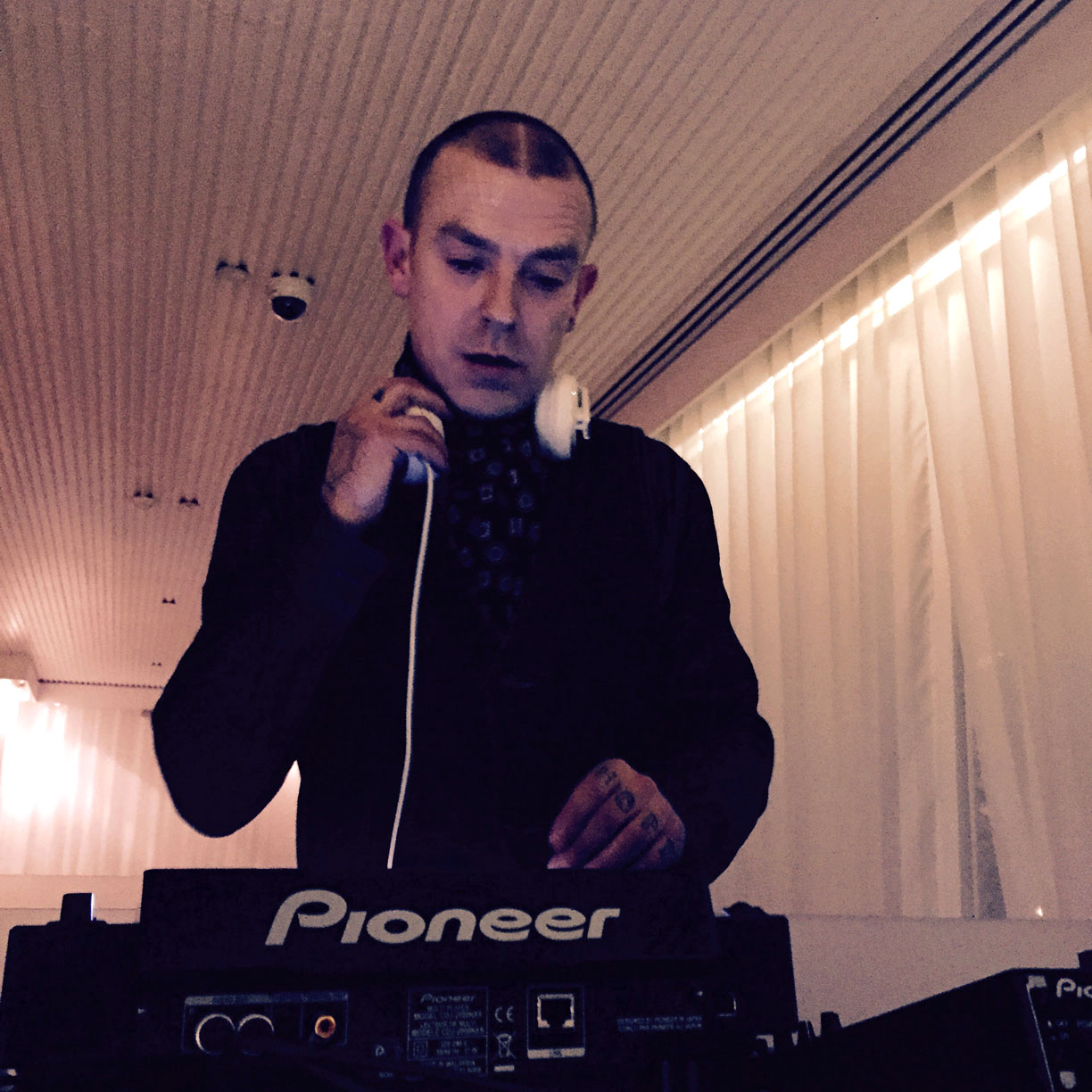
- Adamski in 2014

Background information
- Also known as: Adam Sky; Sonny Eriksson
- Born: Adam Paul Tinley; 4 December 1967 (age 58); Lymington, Hampshire, England
- Genres: Acid house; house
- Occupations: DJ; record producer
- Years active: 1979–present
- Label: MCA
- Website: adamskiofficial.com; sonnyerikssonlive.com
- Spouse: Nana Tinley (born Klimek) (m. 2017)
- Children: 2

Adam Paul Tinley (born 4 December 1967), known professionally as Adamski, as well as Sonny Eriksson, is an English DJ, musician, singer and record producer, prominent at the time of acid house for his tracks "N-R-G" and "Killer", a collaboration with Seal, which was a No. 1 song in the UK in 1990.

== Career ==
Tinley was born in Lymington, Hampshire, England. As a youngster, influenced by punk rock and John Peel, he formed his first band, The Stupid Babies, when he was 11 and living in New Forest in England. He persuaded his five-year-old brother Dominic to sing while he strummed a small guitar, and sent a demo tape to the indie label Fast Product, run by The Human League's manager Bob Last. "Everyone thought that was a really precocious and strange thing for an 11 year-old to do," Adamski recalls "but I just thought that's what everybody did". The kiddie-punk tracks were released on the Earcom3 sampler. When alternative BBC Radio 1 DJ John Peel started playing their song "Babysitters" the band caused quite a stir, receiving positive write-ups in music magazines like Smash Hits and Melody Maker. He performed with his brother Mark Tinley, and Johnny Slut of the band Specimen, as Diskord Datkord. They released their only single in 1988, an electroid cover of "Identity" by punk band X-Ray Spex.

In March 1989, Adamski was booked for his first solo gig at Le Petit Prince Restaurant in Kentish Town, run by his manager Phil Smith. Lenny D, promoter of nightclub Heaven, happened to be walking past, and was convinced by Smith to book Adamski for an all-dayer at Heaven. He quickly catapulted into the upper echelons of the nascent rave scene. Within a few weeks, Adamski was playing to thousands people at Sunrise Festival at Santa Pod Raceway and signed to MCA Records, producing the first rave record on MCA called Liveandirect.

He had success with this first release, which was a collection of tracks recorded live at various raves. It contained a short, live version of his first single "N-R-G", as well as "I Dream of You", which appeared on a free four-track 7" vinyl single given away with the music paper Record Mirror in 1989. The cover of the single "N-R-G" featured a mocked up Lucozade bottle with the word "Lucozade" replaced with "N-R-G".

Adamski toured many clubs with his portable keyboard set up, playing long sets, with an MC, Daddy Chester, and later with Seal. In front of his keyboard was a UK car number plate with the word ADAMSKI on it. Early versions of future singles "Killer" and "Future Love Paradise" were played on some of the Seal dates.

The album, Adamski's Thing, was issued in late 1998, on Trevor Horn's ZTT Records label, Adamski's Thing included tracks, "Intravenous Venus" and "Existential Boredom".

Throughout the late 1990s, Tinley shifted focus to his DJ career. He soon adopted a new moniker, Adam Sky, touring Europe, and making the odd UK appearance such as playing at the electroclash night Nag Nag Nag in London in 2002 – run by his old friend Jonny Slut. As a producer, his songs at that time also included a collaboration with musician Danny Williams. In 2007, he released a remake of The Pop Group's 1979 single "We Are All Prostitutes" with Mark Stewart, which appeared on a number of compilations. His single "Ape-X" was released on Kitsuné Musique in 2006. In 2009, he began to release more material on Shir Khan's record label.

Adamski's futurewaltz project, saw him release album Revolt, as reported in 2014 and 2015.

In 2020, Adamski released Free to Kill Again, featuring 10 new interpretations of "Killer" with guest features by Boy George, Nina Hagen, Adrian Sherwood and Mykki Blanco. In 2022, Adamski released "Black Butterfly", featuring Robert Owens. He also released "Black Star Acid" on Boys Noize Records.

== Discography ==
=== Albums ===
- Liveandirect (1989) – UK No. 47
- Doctor Adamski's Musical Pharmacy (1990) – UK No. 8
- Naughty (1992)
- Adamski vs The Sentinels (1993)
- Adamski's Thing (1998)
- Killer – The Best of Adamski (1999)
- Mutant Pop (1999)
- This is 3-Step EP (2014)
- Revolt (2015)
- The Sound of Sonny Eriksson (2017)
- The Spirit of Sonny Eriksson (EP) (2018)
- Re:nrgise (2019)
- Free to Kill Again (2020)

=== Singles ===
Year	Single	Peak positions										Album
Year	Single	UK	IRE	NED	BEL (FLA)	GER	AUT	SWI	ITA	SWE	NZ	Album
1990	"N-R-G"	12	—	—	—	—	—	—	—	—	—	Doctor Adamski's Musical Pharmacy
1990	"Killer" (featuring Seal)	1	5	2	1	2	11	15	–	5	29	Doctor Adamski's Musical Pharmacy
1990	"The Space Jungle"	7	13	20	24	–	–	25	–	–	21	Doctor Adamski's Musical Pharmacy
1990	"Flashback Jack"	46	—	—	—	—	—	—	—	—	—	Doctor Adamski's Musical Pharmacy
1991	"Never Goin' Down! / Born to Be Alive!" (featuring Jimi Polo / Soho)	51	—	—	—	—	—	—	—	—	—	Naughty
1992	"Get Your Body" (featuring Nina Hagen)	68	—	—	—	—	—	—	—	—	—	Naughty
1992	"Back to Front"	63	—	—	—	—	—	—	—	—	—	Naughty
1993	"Sleeping with an Angel" (with Transformer 2)	–	—	—	—	—	—	—	—	—	—	Singles only
1993	"Bastardo" (with Pizarro)	–	—	—	—	—	—	—	—	—	—	Singles only
1998	"One of the People"	56	—	—	—	—	—	—	—	—	—	Adamski's Thing (as "Adamski's Thing")
1998	"Intravenous Venus"	165	—	—	—	—	—	—	—	—	—	Adamski's Thing (as "Adamski's Thing")
1999	"In the City" (featuring Gerideau)	–	–	–	–	–	–	–	24	—	—	Mutant Pop (as "Adamski Products Inc.")
2000	"Take Me Away"	–	—	—	—	—	—	—	—	—	—	Mutant Pop (as "Adamski Products Inc.")
2002	"Already Out There"	–	—	—	—	—	—	—	—	—	—	Single only
2006	"Ape-X"	–	—	—	—	—	—	—	—	—	—	Single only (as "Adam Sky")
2012	"I Like It"	–	—	—	—	—	—	—	—	—	—	Single only
2012	"Pawa 2 Da PPL" (with Gaudi)	–	—	—	—	—	—	—	—	—	—	
2015	"Dazed 'n' Confused" (featuring Betty Adewole)	–	—	—	—	—	—	—	—	—	—	Revolt
2022	"Black Butterfly" (Robert Owens)	–	—	—	—	—	—	—	—	—	—	
2022	"Black Star Acid" (Boysnoize Records)	–	—	—	—	—	—	—	—	—	—	
"—" denotes releases that did not chart or were not released.

=== Remixes ===
- Miss Kittin and The Hacker – "Stock Exchange" (2003)
- Mignon – "Demons of Love" (2004)
- ESKA – "She's in the Flowers" (2015)
