= Greater Hood Memorial AME Zion Church =

Church in Manhattan, New York

Coordinates: 40°49′18.5″N 73°56′16.5″W

The Greater Hood Memorial AME Zion Church was the first black church in Harlem, New York. It now receives notoriety as the "Oldest Continuing" church in Harlem. The church’s first house of worship was erected on East 117th Street, between 2nd and 3rd Avenues in 1843.

== Timeline ==
- 1820: Congregation recognized as "Little" Mother Zion Church
- 1843: Brick building built on 117th St
- 1865–77: Reconstruction Era
- 1909: Little Zion renamed Rush Memorial in the presence of membership increase and building fund started
- 1911: Building completed at 58–60 W.138 St.
- 1920: One of the most respected churches in New York City
- 1920-25: 600 new members; 175 new members joined in 1924–1925 alone
- 1935: Lost building
- 1936: 57-61 West 137th Street, Church renamed Hood Memorial A.M.E. Zion in honor of Bishop James Walker Hood.
- 1937: Under the leadership or Reverend James McClellan a four-story building was purchased at 229 Lenox Avenue.
- 1938: 200 new members
- 1949: Membership again outgrew site: Purchased site at 160 W. 146th St.
- 2004: Hip Hop Church founded by Rev. Dr. Stephen Pogue, Rev. Kurtis "Kurtis Blow" Walker and Greater Hood Memorial member John Wright. Receives “Proclamation” from NYC Councilman Bill Perkins recognizing it as the “Oldest Continuous Black Church in Harlem"

== Hip Hop Church ==
One of the more celebrated ministries at Greater Hood is Hip Hop Church. founded by Kurtis Blow; Stephen Pogue and John Wright. It received world-wide acclaim for ministering to those who would not attend a regular Sunday Service. Every Thursday night at 7:00 p.m. gospel rap, hip-hop beats, gospel music and preaching.
