= Rodney Dangerfield =

American stand-up comedian (1921–2004)

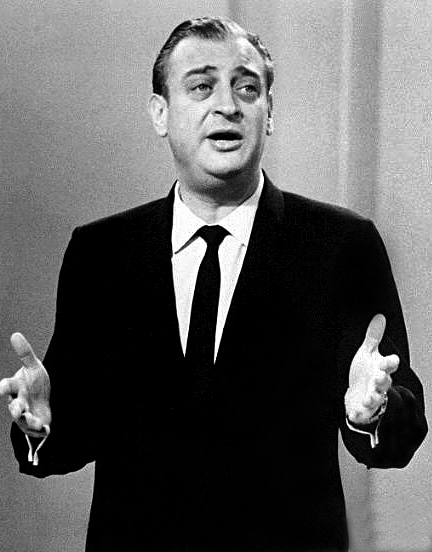
- Dangerfield in 1972
- Born: Jacob Cohen; November 22, 1921; Babylon, New York, U.S.
- Died: October 5, 2004 (aged 82); Los Angeles, California, U.S.
- Resting place: Pierce Brothers Westwood Village Memorial Park and Mortuary
- Occupations: Stand-up comedian; actor; screenwriter; producer
- Spouses: Joyce Indig (m. 1951; div. 1961); (m. 1963; div. 1970); Joan Child (m. 1993)
- Children: 2

Comedy career
- Years active: 1937–2004
- Medium: Stand-up comedy; film; television
- Genres: Blue comedy; observational comedy; insult comedy; Self-deprecation; satire; one-liners
- Website: rodney.com

Jack Roy (born Jacob Cohen; November 22, 1921 – October 5, 2004), better known by the stage name Rodney Dangerfield, was an American stand-up comedian, actor, screenwriter, and producer. He was known for his self-deprecating one-liner humor, his catchphrase "I don’t get no respect!", and his monologues on that theme.

Dangerfield began his career working as a stand-up comic at the Fantasy Lounge in New York City. His act grew in popularity as he became a mainstay on late-night talk shows throughout the 1960s and 1970s, eventually developing into a headlining act on the Las Vegas casino circuit. His breakout film role came as a boorish nouveau riche golfer in the ensemble sports comedy film Caddyshack (1980). He subsequently starred in a string of comedy films such as Easy Money (1983), Back to School (1986), Rover Dangerfield (1991), Ladybugs (1992), and Meet Wally Sparks (1997). He took a rare dramatic role as an abusive father in Oliver Stone's satirical crime film Natural Born Killers (1994).

Over his career he released seven comedy albums, including his album No Respect (1980) that won the Grammy Award for Best Comedy Album. He received a star on the Hollywood Walk of Fame in 2002. Health troubles curtailed his output through the early 2000s before his death in 2004, following a month in a coma due to complications from heart valve surgery.

== Early life ==
Rodney Dangerfield was born Jacob Cohen on Long Island, Babylon, New York, on November 22, 1921. He was the son of Jewish parents Dorothy "Dotty" Teitelbaum and the vaudevillian performer Phillip Cohen, whose stage name was Phil Roy. His mother was born in Hungary. Phillip Cohen was rarely home; his son normally saw him only twice a year. Late in life, Cohen begged for, and received, his son's forgiveness.

Cohen's mother was reportedly emotionally distant for most of his childhood and did not show signs of affection towards her son. In an interview with Howard Stern on May 25, 2004, Dangerfield told Stern that he had been molested by a man in his neighborhood. The man would pay Rodney a nickel and kiss him for five minutes.

After Cohen's father abandoned the family, his mother moved him and his sister to Kew Gardens, Queens, where Dangerfield attended Richmond Hill High School, graduating in 1939. To support himself and his family, he delivered groceries and sold newspapers and ice cream at the beach.

== Career ==
=== Early career ===
At the age of 15, he began to write for stand-up comedians while performing at the Nevele, a former resort in Ellenville, New York. Then, at the age of 19 he legally changed his name to Jack Roy. He struggled financially for nine years, at one point performing as a singing waiter until he was fired, before taking a job selling aluminum siding in the mid-1950s to support his wife and family. He later quipped he was so little known that when he gave up show business, "I was the only one who knew I quit."

In the early 1960s, he started reviving his career as an entertainer. Still working as a salesman by day, he returned to the stage, performing at hotels in the Catskill Mountains, but still finding minimal success. He fell into debt, about $20,000 by his own estimate and could not get booked. He later joked, "I played one club; it was so far out, my act was reviewed in Field & Stream."

Dangerfield came to realize that what he lacked was an "image," a well-defined on-stage persona that audiences could relate to, one that would distinguish him from other comics. After being shunned by some premier comedy venues, he returned home where he began developing a character for whom nothing goes right.

During Roy's comeback bid, he was scheduled to play the Inwood Lounge in Manhattan. Wanting to disguise himself from the longtime patrons who might have remembered him from the 1940s, Roy asked club owner George McFadden to change his name. "He came up with Rodney Dangerfield," the comedian said. "I don't know where it came from." McFadden may have taken it from The Jack Benny Program on NBC radio, which had first used "Rodney Dangerfield" as a character's name in 1941. Ricky Nelson also used the name as a pseudonym in a 1962 episode of The Adventures of Ozzie & Harriet.

=== Career surge ===
Dangerfield's one-liner style of comedy

- "My fan club broke up. The guy died."
- "Last week my house was on fire. My wife told the kids, 'Be quiet, you'll wake up Daddy.'"
- "I was ugly, very ugly. When I was born, the doctor smacked my mother."
- "I went to the fights last night, and a hockey game broke out."

Dangerfield reached national prominence appearing on The Ed Sullivan Show in March 1967. He soon began headlining shows in Las Vegas and continued making frequent appearances on The Ed Sullivan Show. He also became a regular on The Dean Martin Show and appeared on The Tonight Show more than 70 times.

In 1969, Dangerfield teamed up with Anthony Bevacqua to build the Dangerfield's comedy club in New York City, a venue where he could perform on a regular basis without having to constantly travel. In 1978, The Harvard Crimson described a show by Dangerfield at Dangerfield's, prior to him being Harvard Class Day Speaker. The club remained in continuous operation until October 14, 2020. Dangerfield's was the venue for several HBO comedy specials starring stand-up comics such as Jerry Seinfeld, Jim Carrey, Tim Allen, Roseanne Barr, Robert Townsend, Jeff Foxworthy, Sam Kinison, Bill Hicks, Rita Rudner, Andrew Dice Clay, Louie Anderson, Dom Irrera, and Bob Saget.

Dangerfield's re-opened in January 2024 as Rodney's Comedy Club. The re-launched venue pays homage to Dangerfield's legacy with art deco design and a focus on upscale comedy performances.

His signature line, "I don't get no respect!", was adopted for the 1976 animated television show Jabberjaw.

In 1978, Dangerfield was invited to be the keynote speaker at Harvard University's Class Day, an annual ceremony for seniors the day before commencement.

Dangerfield's 1980 comedy album No Respect

His 1980 comedy album No Respect won a Grammy Award. One of his TV specials featured a musical number, "Rappin' Rodney", which appeared on his 1983 follow-up album, Rappin' Rodney. In December 1983, the "Rappin' Rodney" single became one of the first Hot 100 rap records, and the associated video was an early MTV hit. The video featured cameo appearances by Don Novello as a last rites priest munching on Rodney's last meal of fast food in a styrofoam container and Pat Benatar as a masked executioner pulling a hangman's knot. The two appear in a dream sequence wherein Dangerfield is condemned to die and does not get any respect, even in Heaven, as the gates close without him being permitted to enter.

=== Career peak ===
Though his acting career had begun much earlier in obscure movies like The Projectionist (1971), Dangerfield's career took off during the early 1980s, when he began acting in hit comedy movies.

One of Dangerfield's more memorable performances was in the 1980 golf comedy Caddyshack, in which he plays an obnoxious nouveau riche property developer who is a guest at a country club, where he clashes with the uptight Judge Elihu Smails (played by Ted Knight). His role was initially smaller, but because he and fellow cast members Chevy Chase and Bill Murray proved adept at improvisation, their roles were greatly expanded during filming, much to the chagrin of some of their castmates. Initial reviews of Caddyshack praised Dangerfield's standout performance among the wild cast.

Dangerfield's appearance in Caddyshack led to starring roles in Easy Money (1983) and Back to School (1986), for which he also served as co-writer. Unlike his stand-up persona, his comedy film characters were portrayed as successful, confident and generally popular despite being characteristically loud, brash, and detested by the wealthy elite.

Throughout the 1980s, Dangerfield also appeared in a series of commercials for Miller Lite beer, including one in which various celebrities who had appeared in the ads were holding a bowling match. With the score tied, after a bearded Ben Davidson told Rodney, "All we need is one pin, Rodney," Dangerfield's ball went down the lane and bounced perpendicularly off the head pin, landing in the gutter without knocking down any of the pins. He also appeared in the endings of Billy Joel's music video of "Tell Her About It" and Lionel Richie's video of "Dancing on the Ceiling."

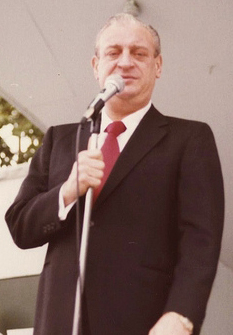
Dangerfield in 1978

In 1990, Dangerfield was involved in Where's Rodney?, an unsold TV pilot for NBC. The show starred Jared Rushton as a teenager, also named Rodney, who could summon Dangerfield whenever he needed guidance about his life.

During the 1990s, Dangerfield starred in comedy films such as Rover Dangerfield (1991), Ladybugs (1992), and Meet Wally Sparks (1997). In a change of pace from the comedy persona that made him famous, he played an abusive father in Natural Born Killers (1994) in a scene for which he wrote or rewrote all of his own lines.

Dangerfield was rejected for membership in the Motion Picture Academy in 1995 by the head of the academy's Actors Section, Roddy McDowall. After fan protests, the academy reconsidered, but Dangerfield then refused to accept membership.

In March 1995, Dangerfield was the first celebrity to personally own a website and create content for it. He interacted with fans who visited his site via an "E-mail me" link, often surprising people with a reply. By 1996, Dangerfield's website proved to be such a hit that he made Websight magazine's list of the "100 Most Influential People on the Web".

Dangerfield appeared in "Burns, Baby Burns", an episode of the animated television series The Simpsons in which he played Mr. Burns's son Larry Burns, a character who is essentially a parody of Dangerfield's onstage persona. He also appeared as himself in an episode of Home Improvement.

Dangerfield appeared in the 2000 Adam Sandler film Little Nicky, playing Lucifer, the father of Satan (Harvey Keitel) and grandfather of Nicky (Sandler).

Dangerfield was recognized by the Smithsonian Institution, which has displayed one of his trademark white shirts and red ties. When he handed the shirt to the museum's curator, Rodney joked, "I have a feeling you're going to use this to clean Lindbergh's plane."

Dangerfield played an important role in comedian Jim Carrey's rise to stardom. In the 1980s, after watching Carrey perform at the Comedy Store in Los Angeles, Rodney signed Carrey to open for Dangerfield's Las Vegas show. The two toured together for about two more years. When Dangerfield celebrated his 80th birthday on The Tonight Show with Jay Leno in November 2001, Carrey made a surprise appearance to thank Dangerfield for his years of support.

== Personal life ==
Dangerfield was married twice to Joyce Indig, a singer. They married on October 3, 1951, divorced in 1961, remarried in 1963, and divorced again in 1970, although Rodney lived largely separated from his family. Together, the couple had two children: son Brian Roy (born 1960) and daughter Melanie Roy-Friedman, born after her parents remarried. From 1993 until his death, Dangerfield was married to Joan Child, whom he met in 1983 at a flower shop she owned in Santa Monica, California.

At the time of a People magazine article on Dangerfield in 1980, he was sharing an apartment on Manhattan's Upper East Side with a housekeeper, his poodle Keno, and his closest friend of 30 years, fellow aluminum siding salesman Joe Ancis, whom Dangerfield called "the funniest man in the world"; Ancis was also a friend of and major influence on Lenny Bruce. Ancis, who Roseanne Barr described as "too psychologically damaged to be able to live in a germ-infested world on his own", lived with Dangerfield until Ancis's death in 2001.

Dangerfield resented being confused with his on-stage persona. Although his wife Joan described him as "classy, gentlemanly, sensitive, and intelligent," he was often treated like the loser he played, and documented this in his 2004 autobiography, It's Not Easy Bein' Me: A Lifetime of No Respect but Plenty of Sex and Drugs. In this work, he also discussed being a marijuana smoker; the book's original title was My Love Affair with Marijuana.

Although Jewish, Dangerfield referred to himself as atheist during an interview with Howard Stern on May 25, 2004, about four months before his death. Dangerfield added during the interview that he was a "logical" atheist, adding: "We're gorillas – does a gorilla come back?". In the same interview, he lamented that he "suffered greatly for being a perfectionist"; he also said: "My mother never hugged me, kissed me, nothing, okay? Other kids would go to sleep listening to a fairy tale. I went to sleep with a fight downstairs, listening to a guy yelling: 'Enough! Enough!'."

== Later years and death ==
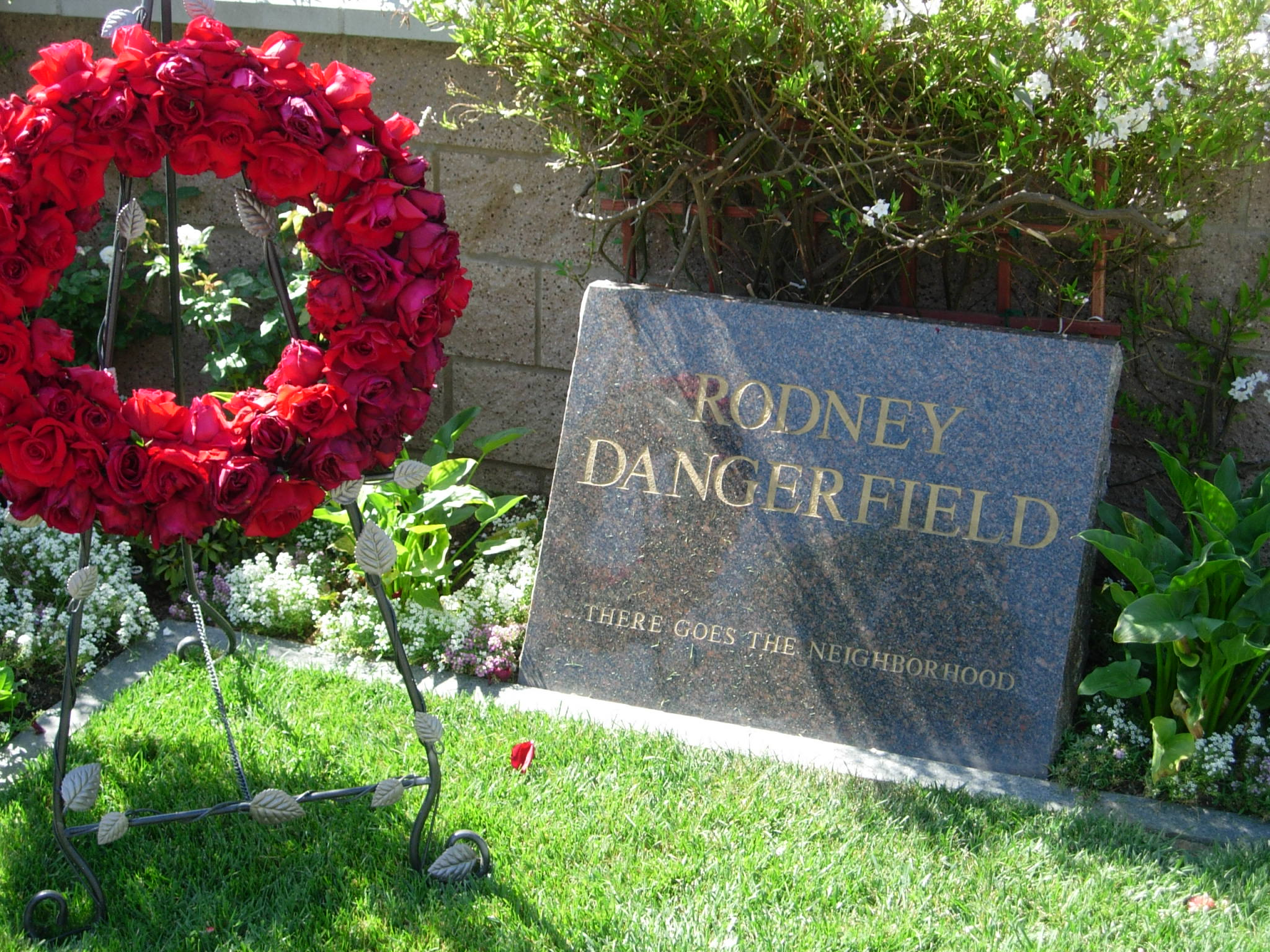
Dangerfield's headstone at Pierce Brothers Westwood Village Memorial Park and Mortuary

On November 22, 2001 (his 80th birthday), Dangerfield suffered a mild stroke while doing stand-up on The Tonight Show. While Dangerfield was performing, host Jay Leno noticed something was wrong with Dangerfield's movements and asked his producer to call the paramedics. During Dangerfield's hospital stay, the staff was reportedly upset that he smoked marijuana in his room. Dangerfield returned to the Tonight Show a year later, performing on his 81st birthday.

On April 8, 2003, Dangerfield underwent brain surgery to improve blood flow in preparation for heart valve-replacement surgery on a later date. The heart surgery took place on August 24, 2004. Upon entering the University of California, Los Angeles Medical Center, he uttered another characteristic one-liner when asked how long he would be hospitalized: "If all goes well, about a week. If not, about an hour and a half."

Dangerfield died on October 5, 2004. He is interred in the Westwood Village Memorial Park Cemetery in Los Angeles. On the day of Dangerfield's death, the randomly selected Joke of the Day on his website happened to be: "I tell ya I get no respect from anyone. I bought a cemetery plot. The guy said: 'There goes the neighborhood!'". This led his wife, Joan Dangerfield, to choose "There goes the neighborhood" as the epitaph on his headstone, which has become so well known that it has been used as a New York Times crossword puzzle clue.

Dangerfield's widow held an event in which the word "respect" had been emblazoned in the sky, while each guest was given a live monarch butterfly for a butterfly-release ceremony led by Farrah Fawcett.

== Impact and legacy ==
UCLA's Division of Neurosurgery named a suite of operating rooms after him and gave him the "Rodney Respect Award", which his widow presented to Jay Leno on October 20, 2005. It was presented on behalf of the David Geffen School of Medicine/Division of Neurosurgery at UCLA at their 2005 Visionary Ball. Other recipients of the "Rodney Respect Award" include: Tim Allen (2007), Jim Carrey (2009), Louie Anderson (2010), Bob Saget (2011), Chelsea Handler (2012), Chuck Lorre (2013), Kelsey Grammer (2014), Brad Garrett (2015), Jon Lovitz (2016), Jamie Masada (2019), Jimmy Fallon (2021), Whitney Cummings (2022), and Ken Jeong (2024).

In memoriam, Saturday Night Live ran a short sketch of Dangerfield (played by Darrell Hammond) at the gates of heaven. Saint Peter mentions that he heard Dangerfield got no respect in life, which prompts Dangerfield to spew an entire string of his famous one-liners. After he is done, he asks why Saint Peter was so interested. Saint Peter replies, "I just wanted to hear those jokes one more time" and waves him into heaven, prompting Dangerfield to joyfully declare: "Finally! A little respect!"

Rodney Dangerfield mural in San Diego, California - 4189 35th St. (Artist: Melany Meza-Dierks)

On October 26, 2004, an episode of George Lopez was dedicated to the memory of Dangerfield, who had died two weeks prior.

On September 10, 2006, Comedy Central's Legends: Rodney Dangerfield commemorated his life and legacy. Featured comedians included Adam Sandler, Chris Rock, Jay Leno, Ray Romano, Roseanne Barr, Jerry Seinfeld, Bob Saget, Jerry Stiller, Kevin Kline, and Jeff Foxworthy. In 2007, a Rodney Dangerfield tattoo was among the most popular celebrity tattoos in the United States. On The Tonight Show with Jay Leno, May 29, 2009, Leno credited Dangerfield with popularizing the style of joke he had long been using. The format of the joke is that the comedian tells a sidekick how bad something is, and the sidekick—in this case, guitar player Kevin Eubanks—sets up the joke by asking just how bad that something is.

The official Rodney Dangerfield website was nominated for a Webby Award after it was relaunched by his widow, Joan Dangerfield, on what would have been his 92nd birthday, November 22, 2013. Since then, Dangerfield has been honored with two additional Webby Award nominations and one win.

In 2014, Dangerfield was awarded an honorary doctorate posthumously from Manhattanville College, officially deeming him Dr. Dangerfield. Beginning on June 12, 2017, Los Angeles City College Theatre Academy hosted the first class of The Rodney Dangerfield Institute of Comedy. The class is a stand-up comedy class which is taught by comedienne Joanie Willgues, aka Joanie Coyote.

In August 2017, a plaque honoring Dangerfield was installed in Kew Gardens, his old Queens neighborhood. In 2019, an inscription was made to the "Wall of Life" at Hebrew University's Mount Scopus Campus that reads "Joan and Rodney Dangerfield."

== Filmography ==
=== Film ===
Year	Title	Role	Notes	Ref.
1956	The Killing	Onlooker At Racetrack Fight	Uncredited extra	
1971	The Projectionist	Renaldi / The Bat		
1980	Caddyshack	Al Czervik	Additional dialogue (uncredited)	
1983	Easy Money	Monty Capuletti	Co-writer	
1986	Back to School	Thornton Melon	Co-writer	
1988	Moving	Loan Broker	Uncredited cameo	
1991	Rover Dangerfield	Rover Dangerfield	Voice; also executive producer and screenwriter	
1992	Ladybugs	Chester Lee		
1994	Natural Born Killers	Ed Wilson, Mallory's Dad	Additional dialogue (uncredited)	
1995	Casper	Himself	Cameo	
1997	Meet Wally Sparks	Wally Sparks	Also producer and co-writer	
1997	Casper: A Spirited Beginning	Mayor Johnny Hunt		
1998	The Godson	The Rodfather		
1998	Rusty: A Dog's Tale	Bandit the Rabbit	Voice	
1999	Pirates: 3D Show	Crewman Below Deck		
2000	My 5 Wives	Monte Peterson	Also producer and co-writer	
2000	Little Nicky	Lucifer		
2002	The 4th Tenor	Lupo	co-writer	
2005	Back by Midnight	Jake Puloski	Posthumous release; filmed in 2002	
2005	Angels with Angles	God	Posthumous release; filmed in 2002	
2008	The Onion Movie	Rodney Dangerfield	Posthumous release; filmed in 2003	

=== Television ===
Year	Title	Role	Notes	Ref.
1967–1971	The Ed Sullivan Show	Himself	17 appearances	
1969–1992	The Tonight Show Starring Johnny Carson	Himself	More than 70 appearances	
1970	The Jackie Gleason Show	Himself	February 7, 1970	
1972–1973	The Dean Martin Show	Himself	Regular performer	
1977	Benny and Barney: Las Vegas Undercover	Manager	Television movie	
1978	The Redd Foxx Comedy Hour	Himself	5-minute stand-up act	
1979, 1980, 1996	Saturday Night Live	Himself	Cameo in '79 & '96, host in '80	
1990	Where's Rodney	Himself	Unsold pilot	
1990	The Earth Day Special	Dr. Vinny Boombatz	Television special	
1993	In Living Color	Himself	Season 4, Episode 18	
1995–2004	The Tonight Show with Jay Leno	Himself	Frequent guest	
1996	The Simpsons	Larry Burns	Voice; Episode: "Burns, Baby Burns"	
1996	Suddenly Susan	Artie	Episode: "Cold Turkey"	
1997	Home Improvement	Himself	Episode: "Thanksgiving"	
1997	Dr. Katz, Professional Therapist	Himself	Episode "Day Planner"	
1997	Mad TV	Himself	Season 2, Episode 12	
2001	XFL	Himself	Cameo in Cheerleaders' Locker Room	
2003	The Electric Piper	Rat-A-Tat-Tat	Voice; Television movie	
2004	Phil of the Future	Max the Dog	Episode: "Doggie Daycare"	
2004	Still Standing	Ed Bailey	Episode: "Still Neighbors"	

=== Music Videos ===
Year	Title	Artist	Ref.
1983	"Tell Her About It"	Billy Joel	
1984	"Rappin' Rodney"	Rodney Dangerfield	
1986	"Dancing on the Ceiling"	Lionel Richie	
1986	"Twist and Shout"	Rodney Dangerfield	
1988	"Wild Thing"	Sam Kinison	
2002	"Dance with Me"	Michael Bolton	

=== Comedy specials ===
Year	Title	Role	Notes	Ref.
1982	Rodney Dangerfield: It's Not Easy Bein' Me	Himself / Various	HBO special	
1983	Rodney Dangerfield: I Can't Take It No More	Himself / Various	ABC special	
1985	Rodney Dangerfield: Exposed	Himself / Various	HBO special	
1986	Rodney Dangerfield: It's Not Easy Bein' Me	Himself	HBO special	
1988	Rodney Dangerfield: Nothin' Goes Right	Himself	HBO special	
1991	Rodney Dangerfield's The Really Big Show	Himself	HBO special	
1992	Rodney Dangerfield: It's Lonely at the Top	Himself	Paramount special	
1997	Rodney Dangerfield's 75th Birthday Toast	Himself	HBO special	

== Discography ==
=== Albums ===
Title	Year
The Loser / What's in a Name (reissue)	1966 / 1977
I Don't Get No Respect	1970
No Respect	1980
Rappin' Rodney	1983
La Contessa	1995
Romeo Rodney	2005

=== Soundtrack albums ===
Title	Year	Notes
Easy Money	1983	
Rover Dangerfield	1991	

=== Compilation albums ===
Title	Year	Notes
20th Century Masters – The Millennium Collection: The Best of Rodney Dangerfield	2005	
Greatest Bits	2008	

=== Video albums ===
Title	Year	Notes
No Respect: The Ultimate Collection	2004	3xDVD box set

== Bibliography ==
- I Couldn't Stand My Wife's Cooking, So I Opened a Restaurant (Jonathan David Publishers, 1972) ISBN 0-8246-0144-0
- I Don't Get No Respect (PSS Adult, 1973) ISBN 0-8431-0193-8
- No Respect (Perennial, 1995) ISBN 0-06-095117-6
- It's Not Easy Bein' Me: A Lifetime of No Respect but Plenty of Sex and Drugs (HarperEntertainment, 2004) ISBN 0-06-621107-7

== Awards and nominations ==
Year	Award	Category	Work	Result	Ref.
1981	Grammy Award	Grammy Award for Best Comedy Recording	No Respect	Won	
1981	UCLA Jack Benny Award	Outstanding Contribution in the Field of Entertainment		Won	
1985	Grammy Award	Grammy Award for Best Comedy Recording	Rappin' Rodney	Nominated	
1987	Grammy Award	Grammy Award for Best Comedy Recording	"Twist and Shout"	Nominated	
1987	American Comedy Award	Funniest Actor in a Motion Picture (Leading Role)	Back to School	Nominated	
1987	MTV Video Music Award	Best Video from a Film	"Twist and Shout" (from Back to School)	Nominated	
1991	AGVA Award	Male Comedy Star of the Year		Won	
1995	American Comedy Award	Creative Achievement Award		Won	
2002	Hollywood Walk of Fame			Won	
2003	Commie Award	Lifetime Achievement Award		Won	
2014	Webby Award	Celebrity Website	Rodney.com	Nominated	
2018	Webby Award	Celebrity Social		Nominated	
2019	Webby Award	People's Voice: Event Website	Rodney Respect Award	Won	
2024	Webby Award	Comedy	The Caddyshack Shuffle	Nominated	
