= K Theory =

American hip hop group

- Origin: San Francisco, California, U.S.
- Genres: Electronic; hip hop; Glitch hop; Festival trap; Dubstep
- Years active: 2011 - present
- Labels: New Trinity Music Group, Simplify, K Theory Music
- Members: Dylan Lewman; Dustin Musser; Malcolm Anthony
- Website: ktheoryofficial.com

K Theory is an electronic hip-hop act by Dylan Lewman, which formerly included Dustin Musser and Malcolm Anthony. The group was founded by Dylan Lewman and Dustin Musser in 2011. They have created remixes for Flo Rida's "GDFR", Rich Homie Quan's "Flex" and Fetty Wap's "Trap Queen".

== Career ==
On January 10, 2017, former K Theory member Malcolm Anthony left K Theory, citing "years of creative differences."

== Discography ==
=== Studio albums ===
Title	Details
#Kristmas 2014	Release Date: 4 March 2015 Label: New Trinity Music Group Formats: digital download

=== Extended plays ===
Title	Details
Welcome to K Theory	Release Date: 1 August 2012 Label: Simplify Formats: digital download
Dubstep R.I.P.	Release Date: 30 October 2014 Label: Geomagnetic Formats: digital download
Electronic Hip Hop Volume 1 (EHH V1)	Release Date: TBA Label: TBA Formats: digital download
Electronic Hip Hop Volume 2 (EHH V2)	Release Date: TBA Label: TBA Formats: digital download

=== Remixes ===
In 2015 their remix of Flo Rida's "GDFR" sold over 80,000 units on Atlantic Records.

== New Trinity Music Group (Record Label) ==
In 2015, K Theory formed their own label calling it New Trinity Music Group. The label released two tracks a week in 2015 including their 2nd Annual 25 Days of Kristmas campaign where they release 25 tracks in 25 days.
