= Kurtis Blow (album) =

Studio album by Kurtis Blow
- Released: September 29, 1980
- Recorded: 1980
- Genre: Old-school hip-hop
- Length: 40:23
- Label: Mercury
- Producer: J.B. Moore; Robert Ford

Kurtis Blow chronology
Kurtis Blow (1980)	Deuce (1981)

Singles from Kurtis Blow
- 1. "The Breaks" Released: June 14, 1980; 2. "Throughout Your Years" Released: 1980; 3. "Hard Times" Released: 1981

Professional ratings
Review scores
Source	Rating
AllMusic	4.5/5 stars
Rolling Stone	(favorable)
The Village Voice	B+

Kurtis Blow is the debut album by American rapper Kurtis Blow. It was released on September 29, 1980, by Mercury Records. The record includes the song "The Breaks", which was often sampled later in hip-hop records, mainly for its introduction made by Blow's a cappella vocal, and for the drum break, giving a wordplay dimension to the title. "Rappin' Blow, Pt. 2" was issued as a single that had a do-it-yourself B-side, the instrumental version. "Takin' Care of Business" is one of the first hip-hop and rock ’n’ roll crossover attempts.

The album was placed at number 71 on "The Greatest 80 Albums of 1980" by Rolling Stone.

== Track listing ==
Side one

1. "Rappin' Blow, Pt. 2" (Kurtis Blow, Robert Ford, Miller, J.B. Moore, Larry Smith) 4:41
2. "The Breaks" (Kurtis Blow, Ford, Moore, Russell Simmons, Smith) 7:41
3. "Way Out West" (Moore) 7:40

Side two

1. "Throughout Your Years" (Kurtis Blow, Moore, Waring) 5:17
2. "Hard Times" (Jimmy Bralower, Moore, Russell Simmons, Smith, Waring) 4:36
3. "All I Want in This World (Is to Find That Girl)" (Moore) 4:59
4. "Takin' Care of Business" (Randy Bachman) 5:29

CD bonus tracks

1. "Christmas Rappin'" (Kurtis Blow, Ford, Moore) 3:57
2. "Breaks [Instrumental]" (Kurtis Blow, Ford, Moore, Simmons, Smith) 5:52

== Personnel ==
Musicians

- Vocals: Kurtis Blow, Sudana Bobatoon, Wayne Garfield, Sheila Spencer, William Waring, Adam White
- Guitars: Eddie Martinez, J.B. Moore, Dean Swenson, John Tropea
- Keyboards: Onaje Allan Gumbs, J.B. Moore
- Bass: Craig Short, Tom Wolk
- Drums: Jimmy Bralower

Production

- Produced By Robert Ford & J.B. Moore
- Engineers: Rod Hui
- Assistant Engineers: Erik Block, Paula Stevens, Lisa Zimet
- Mixing: Vincent Davis
- Mastering: Suha Gur
