= Doctor Adamski's Musical Pharmacy =

Studio album by Adamski
- Released: 1 October 1990
- Recorded: 1989–90
- Genres: Acid house; house
- Label: MCA
- Producer: Adamski

Adamski chronology
Liveandirect (1989)	Doctor Adamski's Musical Pharmacy (1990)	Naughty (1992)

Doctor Adamski's Musical Pharmacy is the first studio album, second album overall, by English acid house DJ and record producer Adamski, released on 1 October 1990 on MCA Records. It includes the UK number one single "Killer", featuring singer Seal on vocals, which was also a top 10 hit worldwide, plus an extended version of the previous single "N-R-G" (UK No. 12) and follow-up singles "The Space Jungle" (UK No. 7) and "Flashback Jack" (UK No. 46).

== Critical reception ==
Professional ratings
Review scores
Source	Rating
AllMusic	2.5/5 stars
Chicago Tribune	2/4 stars
Entertainment Weekly	B

Chuck Eddy from Entertainment Weekly felt the album "is less pretentious, more varied, and more fun. This time he tries to sing, and while he retains the electronic keyboard doodling he started out with, here he uses it as a break in the action rather than as an end in itself."

== Track listing ==
All tracks written by Adam Tinley, except where noted.

No.	Title	Writer(s)	Length
1.	"Flashback Jack"		4:23
2.	"Eighth House"		4:18
3.	"Future Freak"		3:15
4.	"Squiggy Groove"		4:43
5.	"Soul Kitsch Inc"		5:27
6.	"Killer"	Tinley; Seal	4:10
7.	"Space Jungle"	Otis Blackwell; Elvis Presley; Tinley	3:50
8.	"Future Freak (Supernova Bossanova)"		7:18
9.	"Everything Is Fine"		4:19
10.	"I Want You Back"		5:26
11.	"N.R.G. Symphony in F Minor"		8:24
12.	"Pipe Groover"		4:32
13.	"Space Jungle" (Earthquake Mix)	Blackwell; Presley; Tinley	6:09
14.	"Over Killer"	Tinley; Seal	4:54

== Personnel ==
- Adamski – vocals, producer, assistant producer
- Natalie – all the girl voices
- Ricky Lyte – rapping (track 7)
- Toe B. Harrison – bongos (track 8)
- Dan Bates – engineer
- Eugene Romain – engineer (track 12)
- Mike "Spike" Drake – engineer (track 6)

== Charts and certifications ==
=== Weekly charts ===
Chart (1990)	Peak position
UK Albums (Official Charts)	8

=== Certifications ===
Region	Certification	Certified units/sales
United Kingdom (BPI)	Silver	60,000^{^}
^{^} Shipments figures based on certification alone.
