= J. B. Moore =

American music producer (1943–2025)

J. B. Moore (November 4, 1943 – March 13, 2025) was an American music producer. In the late 1970s and early 1980s, he and Robert Ford Jr. helped produce and write records for Kurtis Blow. He died on March 13, 2025, at the age of 81.
