= A Skillz =

English electronic musician

A.Skillz
- Born: Adam Mills
- Origin: Stevenage, Hertfordshire, England
- Genres: Breakbeat, hip hop, big beat, nu-funk
- Occupation: DJ
- Labels: Finger Lickin' Records
- Website: http://www.fingerlickin.co.uk

A.Skillz (born Adam Mills) is an English electronic musician.

He has worked across the UK at FabricLive, Spectrum, Chew The Fat, Supercharged, The Boutique and Sugarbeat as well as gigs around the world at major events, festivals and music industry parties such as The Hit Factory (New York), WMC (Miami) and Field Day (Sydney). In 2003, A.Skillz released his debut album TrickaTechnology alongside Finger Lickin's Krafty Kuts. The album was a nod towards musical influences like De La Soul, James Brown and Jurassic 5, enlisting artists including Kurtis Blow, Real Elements and Ashley Slater.

February 2004 saw A.Skillz and Krafty Kuts team up on the TrickaTechnology Tour with live MCs from the album playing shows all over the UK. The duo then played at Glastonbury Festival, Pacha (Ibiza) and a live session for Steve Lamacq on BBC Radio 1.

In October 2004, A.Skillz then embarked on his first solo tour of Australia which saw him play to sell out crowds in all major capital cities, gaining new fans and respect from fellow DJs along the way. He followed this by extensive gigs in the UK and a busy studio schedule producing music for Channel 4 (Talk Back), Renault (TV advert) and Sony PlayStation (Gran Turismo 4).

A.Skillz kicked off 2005 in January with a mini-mix for Annie Mac that was later voted best mini-mix of the year by Radio 1 listeners, beating industry heavyweights such as Basement Jaxx, Mylo and Scratch Perverts. He followed this with a series of remixes including The Fort Knox Five and a re-rub of his own track "Simple Things". Highlight gigs last year included 10:15 (San Francisco), Snow Bombing (Austria), Mystery Lands Festival (Amsterdam), Homelands (UK), and Live 8 After Show Party (London).

A.Skillz was awarded with the title 'Best DJ' in February 2012 at the Breakspoll International Breakbeat Awards. The awards were hosted at Cable in London. He also picked up the award for 'Best Free Track'.

In general, A.Skillz is known for mixing a wide range of genres, blending together hip hop, soul, funk and rock with dubstep, drum and bass and electro.

== Discography ==
=== Albums ===
- Tricka Technology (2003)

=== Singles ===
- "It's Your Booty-day" (2003)
- "Simple Things"/"Peaches" (2005)
- "Happiness"/"Got the Rhythm" (2008)
- "Tricka Technology" (Ed Funk remix)/"Roll Over Baby" (Fort Knox 5 remix)

=== Remixes ===
- The Nextmen – "Amongst the Madness" (DMC)
- Black Grass – "The Finest Thing" (Catskills)
- A.Skillz & Krafty Kuts – "Check Em" (Inertia/Finger Lickin’)
- The Fort Knox 5 – "Radio Free DC" (Fort Knox)
- Ed Funk feat. Real Elements – "Put That" (Duff Note)
- DJ Yoda – "Tiptoes" (Antidote)
- Jackson 5 - "ABC" (A Skillz remix)
- Marlena Shaw - "California Soul" (A Skillz remix)
- Krewella - "Somewhere to Run" (A Skillz remix)

=== DJ mix albums ===
- A.Skillz & Krafty Kuts – Exclusive CD for Boxfresh
- A.Skillz – Finger Lickin’ presents Fresh Traxx
