= Krafty Kuts =

English music producer and DJ

- Born: Martin Reeves
- Origin: Bognor Regis, England
- Genres: Electronic, nu skool breaks, house, hip hop, breakbeat, grime, trip hop
- Occupations: DJ, producer
- Labels: Ravesta Records, Instant Vibes, Westwood Recordings, Against The Grain
- Website: http://www.kraftykuts.com

Krafty Kuts (real name Martin Reeves) is an English producer and DJ of electronic music and breakbeat.

His first album, Freakshow, was released in 2006 on his Against The Grain label and contains guest artists Tim Deluxe and Ashley Slater from the UK band Freak Power. He had previously released Tricka Technology with his fellow producer and DJ, A Skillz.

Reeves has since released an installment of the Back to Mine compilation series. In October 2009, he released the double mix CD Against the Grain which has 19 of his previously unreleased re-edits. The release won Best Compilation at the 2010 Breakspoll Awards, with Reeves also winning another Best DJ award at the ceremony.
