= Kurtis Blow =

American rapper (born 1959)

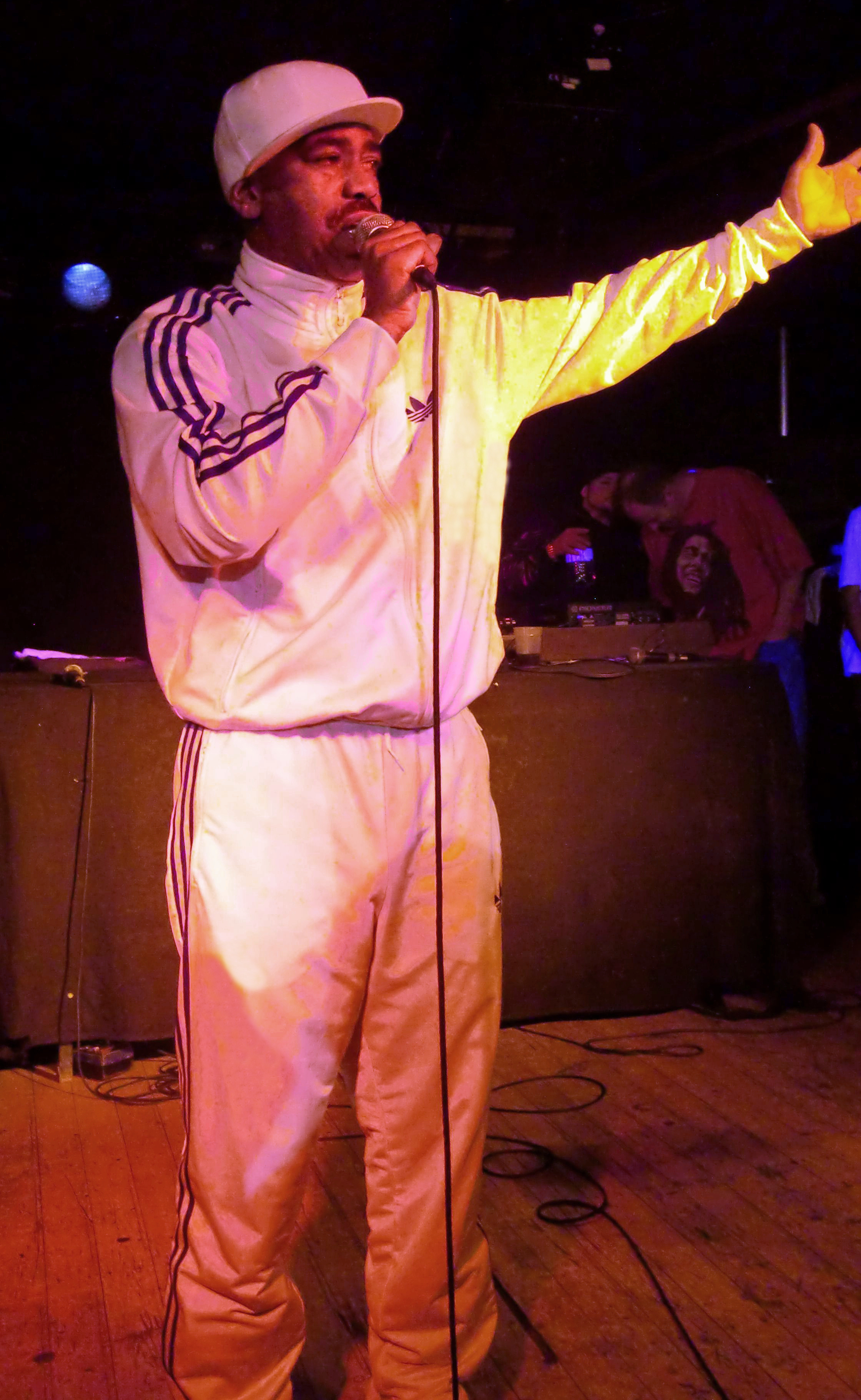
- Kurtis Blow performing in Hannover, Germany on March 30, 2012

Background information
- Born: Kurtis Walker; August 9, 1959 (age 67); New York City, U.S.
- Genre: Hip-hop
- Occupations: Rapper; songwriter; producer; DJ; minister
- Years active: 1979–present
- Labels: Mercury; Polydor

Kurtis Walker (born August 9, 1959), known professionally by his stage name Kurtis Blow, is an American rapper, songwriter, and record producer. Walker is the first commercially successful rapper and the first to sign with a major record label. "The Breaks", a single from his 1980 self-titled debut album, is the first certified gold record rap song. Over his career he released 17 albums. He is an ordained minister. He also serves as leader of the group Hip Hop Alliance.

== Early life, family and education ==
Walker was raised in Harlem, Manhattan, New York City. He attended CCNY and Nyack College, studying communications/film and ministry.

Kurtis began his hip-hop career as a breakdancer, battling other b-boys in Harlem as early as 1973.

== Career ==
In 1979, at the age of twenty, Blow became the first rapper to be signed by a major label, Mercury, which released "Christmas Rappin'". It sold over 400,000 copies, becoming one of the first commercially successful hip-hop singles. Its follow-up, "The Breaks", sold over 840,000 copies. He released ten albums over the next eleven years. His first album was Kurtis Blow, then his second was the top 40 R&B album Deuce. Party Time featured a fusion of rap and go-go. Ego Trip included the hits: "8 Million Stories", "AJ Scratch", and "Basketball". His 1985 album, America, garnered praise for its title track's music video. From this album, the song "If I Ruled the World" became a top 5 hit on Billboard's Hot R&B/Hip-Hop Songs chart. By 1983, he moved into production.

He lived in Co-op City in the Bronx in the mid-1980s.

Besides his own work, Blow has been responsible for hits by the Fat Boys and Run DMC. Run began his career billed as "The Son of Kurtis Blow". Lovebug Starski, Full Force, Russell Simmons and Wyclef Jean all have been produced by, or collaborated with, Walker. Former label mates René & Angela had their R&B chart topping debut "Save Your Love (For #1)" was gift rapped by Blow. Walker produced, with Phillip Jones as co-producer and Dexter Scott King as executive producer, the song "King Holiday", celebrating the first Martin Luther King Jr. Day, a U.S. federal holiday inaugurated in January 1986.

He performed as an actor and in music coordination in several feature films including Leon Kennedy's Knights of the City and the hip-hop film Krush Groove. He was host and co-producer for Das Leben Amerikanischer Gangs (1995), an international film production focusing on the West Coast gang scene. As host and associate producer for Miramax's Rhyme and Reason, he gave an informative account of the status of hip-hop, while he participated in the three volume record release The History of Rap for Rhino Records in 1998. Blow also co-produced "Slippin, Ten Years with the Bloods" and won praises from Showtime for being the most viewed documentary in 2003. Blow was recently a producer for the Netflix show The Get Down.

Blow has spoken out emphatically against racism. He was an active participant in the Artists United Against Apartheid record "Sun City". He worked with Rev. Jesse Jackson's Operation Push and National Rainbow Coalition in Chicago and with Rev. Al Sharpton's Action Network in New York City. In 1995, he started working on-air in radio, Power 106, the No. 1 CHR radio station in Southern California. He hosted The Old School Show on Sunday nights, featuring hits from the past. He also worked for Sirius Satellite Radio on the Classic Old School Hip Hop station Backspin (Channel 46) from 2000 to 2004.

Beginning in 1996, Kurtis Blow was featured in a hip-hop display at the Rock and Roll Hall of Fame. In the same year, rapper Nas debuted at No. 53 on the Billboard Hot 100 with his version of Blow's "If I Ruled the World". The song went on to double platinum. In 1998, the group Next released "Too Close", in which the music of "Christmas Rappin'" was sampled. ASCAP honored Blow and Next at a gala affair on May 26, 1999 for having the number one song for 8 months. In 2002, he traveled to the Middle East to tour the Armed Forces bases performing seventeen shows for the troops.

In December 2014, Blow was the Guest MC for the world premiere of The Hip Hop Nutcracker at New Jersey Performing Arts Center, a well received update of Tchaikovsky's holiday classic. A national tour of the show was scheduled to launch in November 2015 with Kurtis Blow reprising his role as Guest MC opening the show. The show has presently been up and running with 50–60 sold-out performances during the holidays.

In 2016 Blow was unanimously elected as Chairman of the Hip Hop Museum. The museum is slated to open in October 2026 in the Bronx point section of NYC. In 2017, Blow formed "The Bboy Committee", a group of 1st generation Bboys/Girls, who created the style of dance called Bboying, Rocking, and Break Dancing. The members of the Bboy Committee are as follows: Trixie (Lauree Myers), RIP Wallace D, Dancing Doug (Douglas Colon), A1 Bboy Sasa, DJ Clark Kent (Tyrone Smith), the Legendary Smith Twins, the Zulu Kings and Cholly Rock (Anthony G. Horne), OG BGirl – Darlene Rivers, "Puppet" (William "Billy Bill" Waring), Darryl Solomon (The Mad Hatter), Kurtis Blow, Lil Cesar Rivas, and Shabba-Doo. The committee is dedicated to the facilitation of the Bboy section of the Universal Hip Hop Museum.

Blow became an ordained minister on August 16, 2009. As the founder of the Hip Hop Church in Harlem, Blow serves as rapper, DJ, worship leader and licensed minister.

In 2016, Kurtis Blow appeared in a documentary on the evolution of hip-hop, Hip-Hop Evolution. Hosted by Canadian rapper and broadcaster Shad, the series profiled the history of hip-hop music through interviews with many of the genre's leading cultural figures. The series was produced by Russell Peters, Scot McFadyen, Sam Dunn and Nelson George. It won the 2016 Peabody Award, and the 2017 International Emmy Award for Best Arts Programming. The series has been broadcast on Netflix.

As of April 2026, Blow also serves as executive director of Hip Hop Alliance.

== Discography ==
Solo studio albums

- Kurtis Blow (1980)
- Deuce (1981)
- Tough (1982)
- Ego Trip (1984)
- America (1985)
- Kingdom Blow (1986)
- Back by Popular Demand (1988)

Group albums

- Urban Gypsys (as part of Urban Gypsys) (1999)

Collaboration albums

- Just Do It (with The Trinity) (2004)
- Father, Son & Holy Ghost (with The Trinity) (2009)

== See also ==
- List of people from Harlem
