= List of Billboard Hot 100 top-ten singles in 1987 =

The Billboard Hot 100 is a record chart that ranks the best-performing singles in the United States. The chart is published by Billboard magazine and issued weekly; chart rankings are based primarily on each single's weekly sales and radio airplay figures. Throughout the history of the Hot 100, several alterations and additions have been incorporated to the methods by which chart data is obtained and compiled. Until 1991, sales and airplay information was compiled based on reports from record stores and radio playlists. Billboard has since utilized tracking systems such as Nielsen SoundScan and Nielsen Broadcast Data Systems in compiling the chart.

In 1987, one-hundred twenty-three singles reached the top ten of the Hot 100. One-hundred twelve singles reached their peaks within the year, while the remaining eleven reached their peaks in preceding and succeeding years. "Walk Like an Egyptian" by American rock band The Bangles topped the 1987 Billboard year-end chart for the most successful singles of the year. American recording artist Madonna scored four top ten hits in 1987—"Open Your Heart", "La Isla Bonita", "Who's That Girl" and "Causing a Commotion"—the most for any artist in the year. Among the genres that surged in popularity during the year was hard rock, with bands such as Poison, Whitesnake and Bon Jovi experiencing massive commercial success on Billboard charts. All three acts reached the top ten of the Hot 100 in 1987, with the latter two topping the chart with their respective singles "Here I Go Again" and "Livin' on a Prayer". Urban contemporary music also reached a wider audience, with artists such as Lisa Lisa and Cult Jam and Exposé scoring several top ten hits.

== Top ten singles ==
- (#) – 1987 Year-end top 10 single position and rank

List of Billboard Hot 100 top ten singles which peaked in 1987
Top ten entry date	Single	Artist	Peak	Peak date	Weeks in top ten	Ref.(s)
Singles from 1986
December 13	"Notorious"	Duran Duran	2	January 10	6	
December 13	"Shake You Down" (#3)	Gregory Abbott	1	January 17	8	
December 20	"C'est la Vie" (#6)	Robbie Nevil	2	January 17	7	
December 27	"Control"	Janet Jackson	5	January 24	6	
Singles from 1987
January 10	"At This Moment"	Billy Vera and the Beaters	1	January 24	6	
January 10	"Is This Love"	Survivor	9	January 17	3	
January 17	"Open Your Heart"	Madonna	1	February 7	6	
January 17	"Land of Confusion"	Genesis	4	January 31	4	
January 24	"Someday"	Glass Tiger	7	January 24	3	
January 24	"Change of Heart"	Cyndi Lauper	3	February 14	5	
January 24	"Victory"	Kool & the Gang	10	January 24	1	
January 31	"Livin' on a Prayer" (#10)	Bon Jovi	1	February 14	7	
January 31	"Touch Me (I Want Your Body)"	Samantha Fox	4	February 14	4	
February 7	"Keep Your Hands to Yourself"	The Georgia Satellites	2	February 21	5	
February 7	"Will You Still Love Me?"	Chicago	3	February 21	4	
February 7	"We're Ready"	Boston	9	February 14	2	
February 14	"Jacob's Ladder"	Huey Lewis and the News	1	March 14	6	
February 14	"Ballerina Girl"	Lionel Richie	7	February 21	3	
February 21	"You Got It All"	The Jets	3	March 7	4	
February 21	"Love You Down"	Ready for the World	9	February 21	1	
February 28	"Somewhere Out There"	Linda Ronstadt and James Ingram	2	March 14	5	
February 28	"Respect Yourself"	Bruce Willis	5	March 7	4	
February 28	"(You Gotta) Fight for Your Right (To Party!)"	Beastie Boys	7	March 7	2	
February 28	"Big Time"	Peter Gabriel	8	March 7	4	
March 7	"Mandolin Rain"	Bruce Hornsby and the Range	4	March 21	5	
March 7	"Let's Wait Awhile"	Janet Jackson	2	March 21	5	
March 14	"Lean on Me"	Club Nouveau	1	March 21	6	
March 14	"Nothing's Gonna Stop Us Now" (#5)	Starship	1	April 4	8	
March 21	"Tonight, Tonight, Tonight"	Genesis	3	April 4	4	
March 21	"Come Go with Me"	Exposé	5	April 4	5	
March 28	"The Final Countdown"	Europe	8	March 28	2	
March 28	"Don't Dream It's Over"	Crowded House	2	April 25	7	
March 28	"I Knew You Were Waiting (For Me)"	Aretha Franklin and George Michael	1	April 18	7	
April 4	"Let's Go!"	Wang Chung	9	April 11	2	
April 11	"Sign o' the Times"	Prince	3	April 25	5	
April 11	"Midnight Blue"	Lou Gramm	5	April 18	3	
April 11	"The Finer Things"	Steve Winwood	8	April 18	4	
April 18	"Looking for a New Love"	Jody Watley	2	May 2	6	
April 18	"(I Just) Died in Your Arms"	Cutting Crew	1	May 2	6	
April 25	"La Isla Bonita"	Madonna	4	May 2	5	
April 25	"With or Without You"	U2	1	May 16	8	
May 2	"Stone Love"	Kool & the Gang	10	May 2	1	
May 9	"Heat of the Night"	Bryan Adams	6	May 16	4	
May 9	"The Lady in Red"	Chris de Burgh	3	May 23	6	
May 9	"Big Love"	Fleetwood Mac	5	May 30	5	
May 16	"You Keep Me Hangin' On"	Kim Wilde	1	June 6	6	
May 16	"Talk Dirty to Me"	Poison	9	May 16	2	
May 16	"Always"	Atlantic Starr	1	June 13	7	
May 30	"Head to Toe"	Lisa Lisa and Cult Jam	1	June 20	7	
May 30	"Right on Track"	Breakfast Club	7	May 30	1	
May 30	"I Know What I Like"	Huey Lewis and the News	9	May 30	1	
May 30	"Wanted Dead or Alive"	Bon Jovi	7	June 6	5	
June 6	"In Too Deep"	Genesis	3	June 27	5	
June 6	"Diamonds"	Herb Alpert featuring Janet Jackson	5	June 20	4	
June 6	"I Wanna Dance with Somebody (Who Loves Me)" (#4)	Whitney Houston	1	June 27	9	
June 13	"Just to See Her"	Smokey Robinson	8	July 4	4	
June 20	"Alone" (#2)	Heart	1	July 11	8	
June 20	"Songbird"	Kenny G	4	July 11	4	
June 27	"Shakedown" (#9)	Bob Seger	1	August 1	7	
July 4	"Don't Disturb This Groove"	The System	4	July 18	4	
July 4	"Point of No Return"	Exposé	5	July 18	4	
July 4	"Funkytown"	Pseudo Echo	6	July 18	3	
July 11	"Something So Strong"	Crowded House	7	July 25	3	
July 11	"I Still Haven't Found What I'm Looking For"	U2	1	August 8	7	
July 18	"I Want Your Sex"	George Michael	2	August 8	6	
July 18	"Rhythm Is Gonna Get You"	Gloria Estefan and Miami Sound Machine	5	August 1	5	
July 25	"Heart and Soul"	T'Pau	4	August 8	5	
August 1	"Cross My Broken Heart"	The Jets	7	August 1	3	
August 1	"Luka"	Suzanne Vega	3	August 22	5	
August 1	"Wot's It to Ya"	Robbie Nevil	10	August 1	2	
August 8	"Who's That Girl"	Madonna	1	August 22	6	
August 15	"La Bamba"	Los Lobos	1	August 29	7	
August 15	"Don't Mean Nothing"	Richard Marx	3	August 29	4	
August 15	"Only in My Dreams"	Debbie Gibson	4	September 5	5	
August 22	"Rock Steady"	The Whispers	7	August 29	3	
August 22	"I Just Can't Stop Loving You"	Michael Jackson and Siedah Garrett	1	September 19	6	
August 29	"Didn't We Almost Have It All"	Whitney Houston	1	September 26	7	
August 29	"It's Not Over ('Til It's Over)"	Starship	9	August 29	1	
August 29	"Can't We Try"	Dan Hill and Vonda Shepard	6	September 12	4	
September 5	"Here I Go Again" (#7)	Whitesnake	1	October 10	7	
September 5	"Doing It All for My Baby"	Huey Lewis and the News	6	September 19	3	
September 12	"When Smokey Sings"	ABC	5	September 19	4	
September 12	"I Heard a Rumour"	Bananarama	4	September 26	6	
September 19	"Lost in Emotion"	Lisa Lisa and Cult Jam	1	October 17	6	
September 19	"Touch of Grey"	Grateful Dead	9	September 26	2	
September 26	"Carrie"	Europe	3	October 10	5	
September 26	"U Got the Look"	Prince	2	October 17	6	
October 3	"Who Will You Run To"	Heart	7	October 3	3	
October 3	"Paper in Fire"	John Cougar Mellencamp	9	October 3	3	
October 3	"One Heartbeat"	Smokey Robinson	10	October 3	1	
October 10	"Bad"	Michael Jackson	1	October 24	5	
October 10	"Casanova"	LeVert	5	October 31	4	
October 17	"Causing a Commotion"	Madonna	2	October 24	5	
October 24	"I Think We're Alone Now"	Tiffany	1	November 7	6	
October 24	"Mony Mony"	Billy Idol	1	November 21	6	
October 24	"Let Me Be the One"	Exposé	7	October 31	3	
October 24	"Little Lies"	Fleetwood Mac	4	November 7	5	
October 31	"Breakout"	Swing Out Sister	6	November 14	4	
October 31	"Brilliant Disguise"	Bruce Springsteen	5	November 21	5	
November 7	"(I've Had) The Time of My Life"	Bill Medley and Jennifer Warnes	1	November 28	6	
November 7	"It's a Sin"	Pet Shop Boys	9	November 14	2	
November 14	"Heaven Is a Place on Earth"	Belinda Carlisle	1	December 5	6	
November 14	"Should've Known Better"	Richard Marx	3	December 12	5	
November 21	"I've Been in Love Before"	Cutting Crew	9	November 21	2	
November 21	"Faith"	George Michael	1	December 12	9	
November 28	"We'll Be Together"	Sting	7	December 5	4	
November 28	"Shake Your Love"	Debbie Gibson	4	December 19	7	
December 5	"Is This Love"	Whitesnake	2	December 19	7	
December 5	"The One I Love"	R.E.M.	9	December 5	1	
December 5	"Don't You Want Me"	Jody Watley	6	December 19	6	
December 19	"Catch Me (I'm Falling)"	Pretty Poison	8	December 19	3	
December 19	"Valerie"	Steve Winwood	9	December 19	1	

=== 1986 peaks ===
List of Billboard Hot 100 top ten singles in 1987 which peaked in 1986
Top ten entry date	Single	Artist	Peak	Peak date	Weeks in top ten	Ref.(s)
November 22	"The Way It Is" (#8)	Bruce Hornsby and the Range	1	December 13	8	
November 29	"Walk Like an Egyptian" (#1)	The Bangles	1	December 20	8	
December 6	"Everybody Have Fun Tonight"	Wang Chung	2	December 27	7	
December 13	"Stand by Me"	Ben E. King	9	December 20	4	
December 27	"War"	Bruce Springsteen and the E Street Band	8	December 27	3	
December 27	"Don't Get Me Wrong"	The Pretenders	10	December 27	2	

=== 1988 peaks ===
List of Billboard Hot 100 top ten singles in 1987 which peaked in 1988
Top ten entry date	Single	Artist	Peak	Peak date	Weeks in top ten	Ref.(s)
December 5	"So Emotional"	Whitney Houston	1	January 9	8	
December 12	"Got My Mind Set on You"	George Harrison	1	January 16	8	
December 26	"The Way You Make Me Feel"	Michael Jackson	1	January 23	6	
December 26	"Cherry Bomb"	John Cougar Mellencamp	8	January 9	3	
December 26	"Need You Tonight"	INXS	1	January 30	8	

== See also ==
- 1987 in music
- List of Billboard Hot 100 number ones of 1987
- Billboard Year-End Hot 100 singles of 1987
