= List of Cash Box Top 100 number-one singles of 1987 =

These are the singles that reached number one on the Top 100 Singles chart in 1987 as published by Cash Box magazine.

Key
†	Indicates best-performing single of 1987

Issue date	Song	Artist
January 3	"Everybody Have Fun Tonight"	Wang Chung
January 10	"Everybody Have Fun Tonight"	Wang Chung
January 17	"Shake You Down"	Gregory Abbott
January 24	"Shake You Down"	Gregory Abbott
January 31	"At This Moment"	Billy Vera & the Beaters
February 7	"Open Your Heart"	Madonna
February 14	"Livin' on a Prayer"	Bon Jovi
February 21	"Livin' on a Prayer"	Bon Jovi
February 28	"Livin' on a Prayer"	Bon Jovi
March 7	"Livin' on a Prayer"	Bon Jovi
March 14	"Jacob's Ladder"	Huey Lewis and the News
March 21	"Lean On Me"	Club Nouveau
March 28	"Lean On Me"	Club Nouveau
April 4	"Nothing's Gonna Stop Us Now"	Starship
April 11	"Nothing's Gonna Stop Us Now"	Starship
April 18	"Nothing's Gonna Stop Us Now"	Starship
April 25	"I Knew You Were Waiting (For Me)"	Aretha Franklin & George Michael
May 2	"(I Just) Died in Your Arms"	Cutting Crew
May 9	"(I Just) Died in Your Arms"	Cutting Crew
May 16	"With or Without You"	U2
May 23	"With or Without You"	U2
May 30	"With or Without You"	U2
June 6	"Always"	Atlantic Starr
June 13	"Always"	Atlantic Starr
June 20	"Head to Toe" †	Lisa Lisa & Cult Jam
June 27	"Head to Toe" †	Lisa Lisa & Cult Jam
July 4	"I Wanna Dance with Somebody (Who Loves Me)"	Whitney Houston
July 11	"I Wanna Dance with Somebody (Who Loves Me)"	Whitney Houston
July 18	"Alone"	Heart
July 25	"Alone"	Heart
August 1	"Shakedown"	Bob Seger
August 8	"I Still Haven't Found What I'm Looking For"	U2
August 15	"I Still Haven't Found What I'm Looking For"	U2
August 22	"Who's That Girl"	Madonna
August 29	"La Bamba"	Los Lobos
September 5	"La Bamba"	Los Lobos
September 12	"I Just Can't Stop Loving You"	Michael Jackson
September 19	"I Just Can't Stop Loving You"	Michael Jackson
September 26	"Didn't We Almost Have It All"	Whitney Houston
October 3	"Here I Go Again"	Whitesnake
October 10	"Here I Go Again"	Whitesnake
October 17	"Lost in Emotion"	Lisa Lisa & Cult Jam
October 24	"Bad"	Michael Jackson
October 31	"Bad"	Michael Jackson
November 7	"I Think We're Alone Now"	Tiffany
November 14	"I Think We're Alone Now"	Tiffany
November 21	"Mony Mony (Live)"	Billy Idol
November 28	"(I've Had) The Time of My Life"	Bill Medley & Jennifer Warnes
December 5	"Heaven Is a Place on Earth"	Belinda Carlisle
December 12	"Faith"	George Michael
December 19	"Faith"	George Michael
December 26	"Faith"	George Michael

== See also ==
- 1987 in music
- List of Hot 100 number-one singles of 1987 (U.S.)
