= List of Billboard Hot 100 number-one singles of the 1980s =

The Billboard Hot 100 is the main song chart of the American music industry and is updated every week by the Billboard magazine. During the 1980s the chart was based collectively on each single's weekly physical sales figures and airplay on American radio stations.

== Number ones ==
Key
♪ – Number-one single of the year

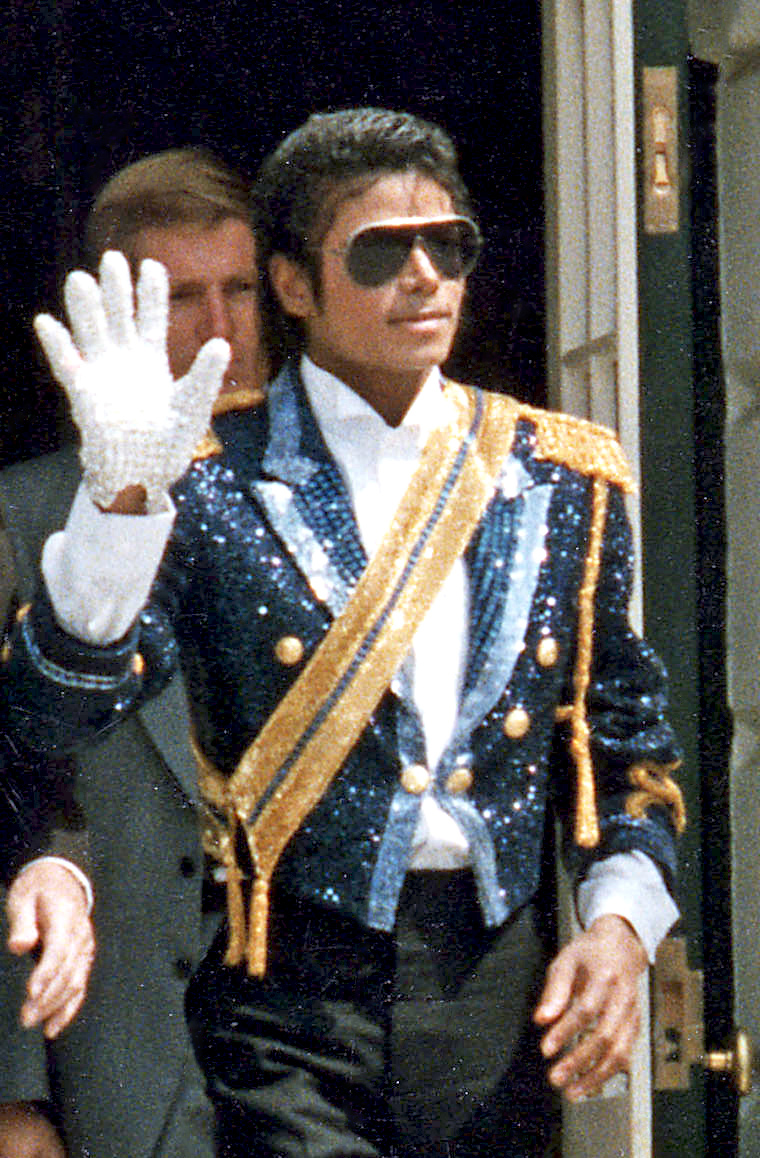
Michael Jackson had the highest number of top hits at the Billboard Hot 100 chart during the 1980s (nine songs). In addition, Jackson remained the longest at the top of the Billboard Hot 100 chart during the 1980s (27 weeks).

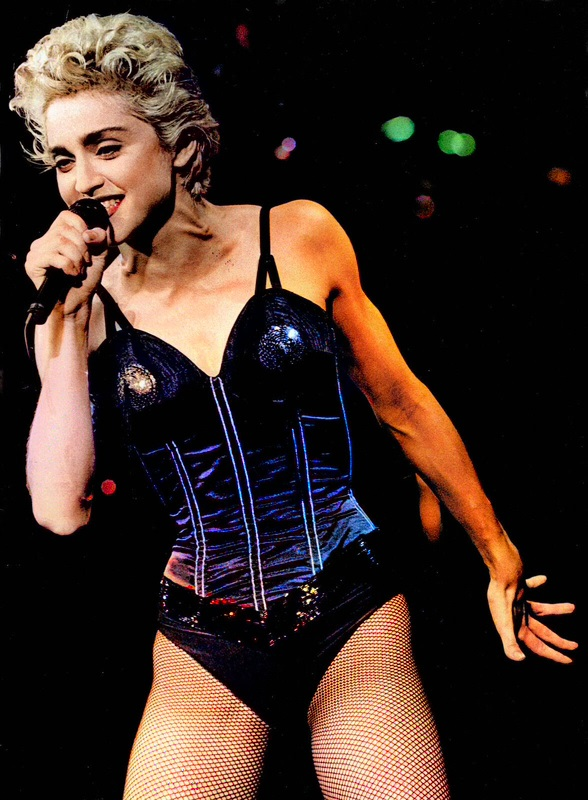
Madonna ranked as the most successful female artist of the 1980s, with seven songs and 15 weeks atop the chart.

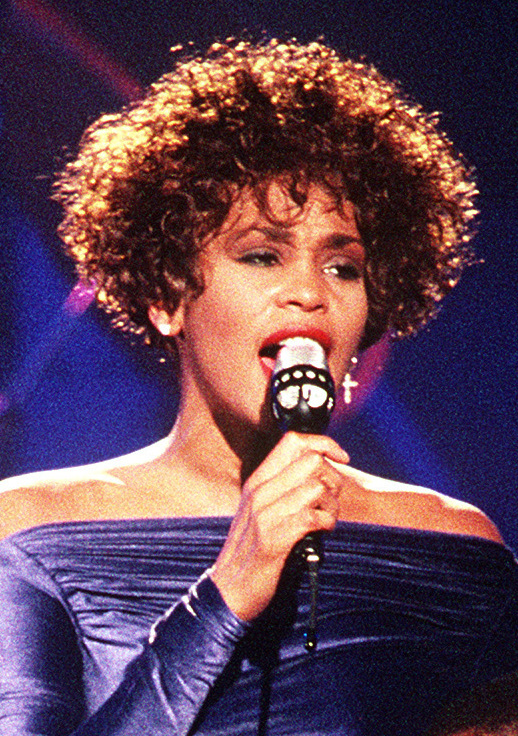
Whitney Houston scored seven consecutive number-one singles during the 1980s, becoming the only artist in the chart's history to achieve this feat.

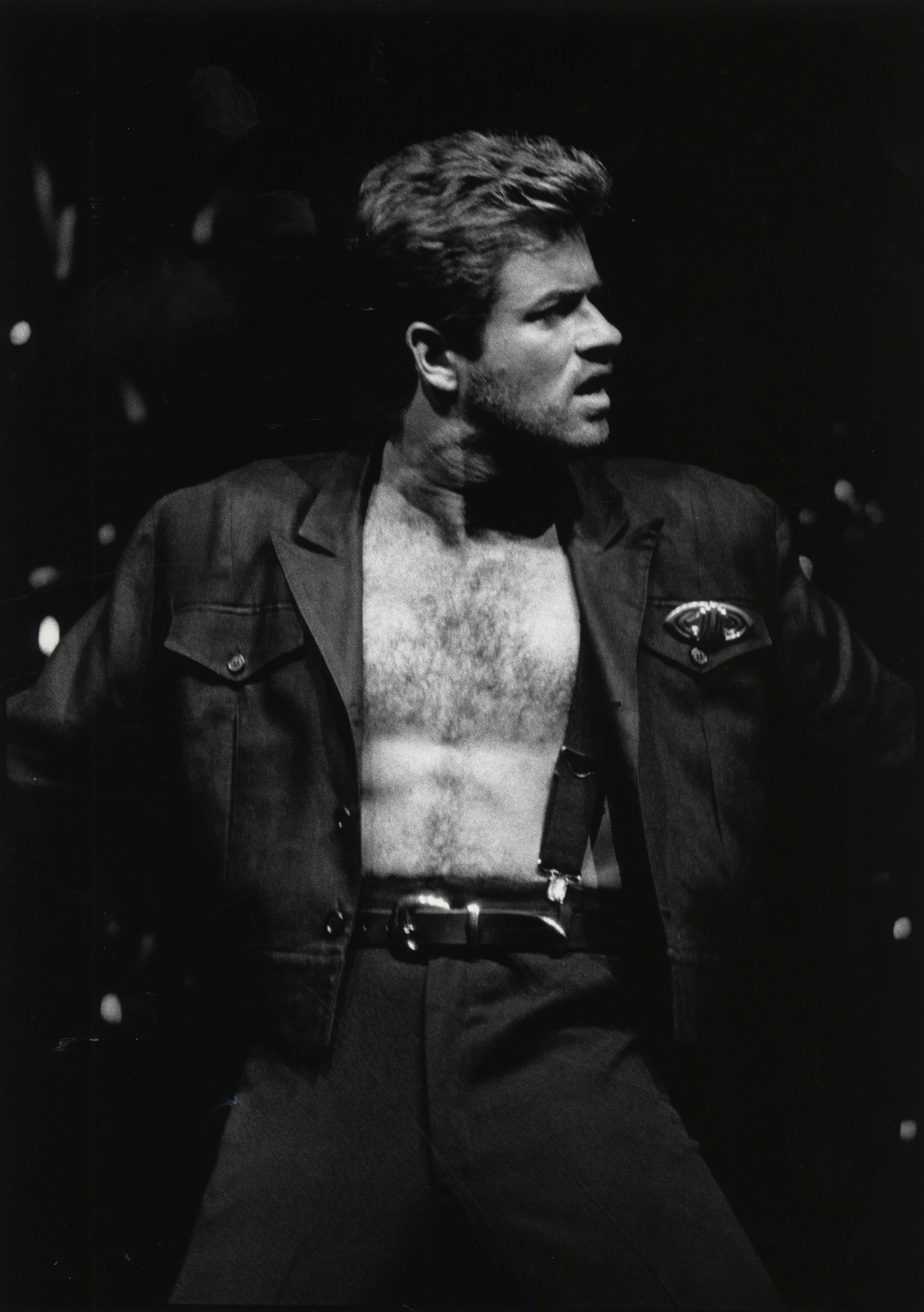
During the 1980s, George Michael scored four number-one singles as a solo artist, three with Wham! and one as a duet with Aretha Franklin.

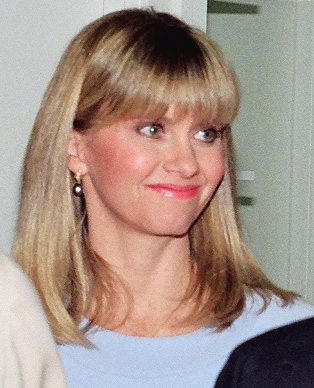
Olivia Newton-John's "Physical" remained the longest at the top of the Billboard Hot 100 chart during the 1980s (10 weeks).

#	Reached number one	Artist(s)	Single	Record label	Weeks at number one	Ref
1980
480	January 5, 1980	KC and the Sunshine Band	"Please Don't Go"	TK Records	1	
481	January 19, 1980	Michael Jackson	"Rock with You"	Epic	4	
482	February 16, 1980	Captain & Tennille	"Do That to Me One More Time"	Casablanca	1	
483	February 23, 1980	Queen	"Crazy Little Thing Called Love"	Elektra	4	
484	March 22, 1980	Pink Floyd	"Another Brick in the Wall (Part 2)"	Columbia	4	
485	April 19, 1980	Blondie	"Call Me"♪ (1980)	Chrysalis	6	
486	May 31, 1980	Lipps, Inc.	"Funkytown"	Casablanca	4	
487	June 28, 1980	Paul McCartney	"Coming Up (Live at Glasgow)"	Columbia	3	
488	July 19, 1980	Billy Joel	"It's Still Rock and Roll to Me"	Columbia	2	
489	August 2, 1980	Olivia Newton-John	"Magic"	MCA	4	
490	August 30, 1980	Christopher Cross	"Sailing"	Warner Bros.	1	
491	September 6, 1980	Diana Ross	"Upside Down"	Motown	4	
492	October 4, 1980	Queen	"Another One Bites the Dust"	Elektra	3	
493	October 25, 1980	Barbra Streisand	"Woman in Love"	Columbia	3	
494	November 15, 1980	Kenny Rogers	"Lady"	Liberty	6	
495	December 27, 1980	John Lennon	"(Just Like) Starting Over"	Geffen	5	
1981
496	January 31, 1981	Blondie	"The Tide Is High"	Chrysalis	1	
497	February 7, 1981	Kool & the Gang	"Celebration"	De-Lite	2	
498	February 21, 1981	Dolly Parton	"9 to 5"	RCA	2	
499	February 28, 1981	Eddie Rabbitt	"I Love a Rainy Night"	Elektra	2	
500	March 21, 1981	REO Speedwagon	"Keep On Loving You"	Epic	1	
501	March 28, 1981	Blondie	"Rapture"	Chrysalis	2	
502	April 11, 1981	Daryl Hall and John Oates	"Kiss on My List"	RCA	3	
503	May 2, 1981	Sheena Easton	"Morning Train (Nine to Five)"	EMI America	2	
504	May 16, 1981	Kim Carnes	"Bette Davis Eyes"♪ (1981)	Capitol	9	
505	June 20, 1981	Stars on 45	"Stars on 45"	Radio Records	1	
506	July 25, 1981	Air Supply	"The One That You Love"	Arista	1	
507	August 1, 1981	Rick Springfield	"Jessie's Girl"	RCA	2	
508	August 15, 1981	Diana Ross and Lionel Richie	"Endless Love"	Motown	9	
509	October 17, 1981	Christopher Cross	"Arthur's Theme (Best That You Can Do)"	Warner Bros.	3	
510	November 7, 1981	Daryl Hall and John Oates	"Private Eyes"	RCA	2	
511	November 21, 1981	Olivia Newton-John	"Physical"♪ (1982)	MCA	10	
1982
512	January 30, 1982	Daryl Hall and John Oates	"I Can't Go for That (No Can Do)"	RCA	1	
513	February 6, 1982	The J. Geils Band	"Centerfold"	EMI America	6	
514	March 20, 1982	Joan Jett and the Blackhearts	"I Love Rock 'n' Roll"	Boardwalk	7	
515	May 8, 1982	Vangelis	"Chariots of Fire"	Polydor	1	
516	May 15, 1982	Paul McCartney with Stevie Wonder	"Ebony and Ivory"	Columbia	7	
517	July 3, 1982	The Human League	"Don't You Want Me"	Virgin	3	
518	July 24, 1982	Survivor	"Eye of the Tiger"	Scotti Bros.	6	
519	September 4, 1982	Steve Miller Band	"Abracadabra"	Capitol	2	
520	September 11, 1982	Chicago	"Hard to Say I'm Sorry"	Full Moon/Warner Bros.	2	
521	October 2, 1982	John Mellencamp	"Jack & Diane"	Riva	4	
522	October 30, 1982	Men at Work	"Who Can It Be Now"	Columbia	1	
523	November 6, 1982	Joe Cocker and Jennifer Warnes	"Up Where We Belong"	Island	3	
524	November 27, 1982	Lionel Richie	"Truly"	Motown	2	
525	December 11, 1982	Toni Basil	"Mickey"	Chrysalis	1	
526	December 18, 1982	Daryl Hall and John Oates	"Maneater"	RCA	4	
1983
527	January 15, 1983	Men at Work	"Down Under"	Columbia	4	
528	February 5, 1983	Toto	"Africa"	Columbia	1	
529	February 19, 1983	Patti Austin and James Ingram	"Baby, Come to Me"	Qwest	2	
530	March 5, 1983	Michael Jackson	"Billie Jean"	Epic	7	
531	April 23, 1983	Dexys Midnight Runners	"Come On Eileen"	Mercury	1	
532	April 30, 1983	Michael Jackson	"Beat It"	Epic	3	
533	May 21, 1983	David Bowie	"Let's Dance"	EMI America	1	
534	May 28, 1983	Irene Cara	"Flashdance... What a Feeling"	Casablanca	6	
535	July 9, 1983	The Police	"Every Breath You Take"♪ (1983)	A&M	8	
536	September 3, 1983	Eurythmics	"Sweet Dreams (Are Made of This)"	RCA	1	
537	September 10, 1983	Michael Sembello	"Maniac"	Casablanca	2	
538	September 24, 1983	Billy Joel	"Tell Her About It"	Columbia	1	
539	October 1, 1983	Bonnie Tyler	"Total Eclipse of the Heart"	Columbia	4	
540	October 29, 1983	Kenny Rogers with Dolly Parton	"Islands in the Stream"	RCA	2	
541	November 12, 1983	Lionel Richie	"All Night Long (All Night)"	Motown	4	
542	December 10, 1983	Paul McCartney and Michael Jackson	"Say, Say, Say"	Columbia	6	
1984
543	January 21, 1984	Yes	"Owner of a Lonely Heart"	Atco	2	
544	February 4, 1984	Culture Club	"Karma Chameleon"	Virgin/Epic	3	
545	February 25, 1984	Van Halen	"Jump"	Warner Bros.	5	
546	March 31, 1984	Kenny Loggins	"Footloose"	Columbia	3	
547	April 21, 1984	Phil Collins	"Against All Odds (Take a Look at Me Now)"	Atlantic	3	
548	May 12, 1984	Lionel Richie	"Hello"	Motown	2	
549	May 26, 1984	Deniece Williams	"Let's Hear It for the Boy"	Columbia	2	
550	June 9, 1984	Cyndi Lauper	"Time After Time"	Portrait	2	
551	June 23, 1984	Duran Duran	"The Reflex"	Capitol	2	
552	July 7, 1984	Prince	"When Doves Cry"♪ (1984)	Warner Bros.	5	
553	August 11, 1984	Ray Parker Jr.	"Ghostbusters"	Arista	3	
554	September 1, 1984	Tina Turner	"What's Love Got to Do with It"	Capitol	3	
555	September 22, 1984	John Waite	"Missing You"	EMI America	1	
556	September 29, 1984	Prince and The Revolution	"Let's Go Crazy"	Warner Bros.	2	
557	October 13, 1984	Stevie Wonder	"I Just Called to Say I Love You"	Motown	3	
558	November 3, 1984	Billy Ocean	"Caribbean Queen (No More Love on the Run)"	Arista	2	
559	November 17, 1984	Wham!	"Wake Me Up Before You Go-Go"	Columbia	3	
560	December 8, 1984	Daryl Hall and John Oates	"Out of Touch"	RCA	2	
561	December 22, 1984	Madonna	"Like a Virgin"	Warner Bros.	6	
1985
562	February 2, 1985	Foreigner	"I Want to Know What Love Is"	Atlantic	2	
563	February 16, 1985	Wham! featuring George Michael	"Careless Whisper"♪ (1985)	Columbia	3	
564	March 9, 1985	REO Speedwagon	"Can't Fight This Feeling"	Epic	3	
565	March 30, 1985	Phil Collins	"One More Night"	Atlantic	2	
566	April 13, 1985	USA for Africa	"We Are the World"	Columbia	4	
567	May 11, 1985	Madonna	"Crazy for You"	Warner Bros.	1	
568	May 18, 1985	Simple Minds	"Don't You (Forget About Me)"	A&M	1	
569	May 25, 1985	Wham!	"Everything She Wants"	Columbia	2	
570	June 8, 1985	Tears for Fears	"Everybody Wants to Rule the World"	PolyGram	2	
571	June 22, 1985	Bryan Adams	"Heaven"	A&M	2	
572	July 6, 1985	Phil Collins	"Sussudio"	Atlantic	1	
573	July 13, 1985	Duran Duran	"A View to a Kill"	Capitol	2	
574	July 27, 1985	Paul Young	"Everytime You Go Away"	Columbia	1	
575	August 3, 1985	Tears for Fears	"Shout"	PolyGram	3	
576	August 24, 1985	Huey Lewis and the News	"The Power of Love"	Chrysalis	2	
577	September 7, 1985	John Parr	"St. Elmo's Fire (Man in Motion)"	Atlantic	2	
578	September 21, 1985	Dire Straits	"Money for Nothing"	Warner Bros.	3	
579	October 12, 1985	Ready for the World	"Oh Sheila"	MCA	1	
580	October 19, 1985	a-ha	"Take On Me"	Warner Bros.	1	
581	October 26, 1985	Whitney Houston	"Saving All My Love for You"	Arista	1	
582	November 2, 1985	Stevie Wonder	"Part-Time Lover"	Motown	1	
583	November 9, 1985	Jan Hammer	"Miami Vice Theme"	MCA	1	
584	November 16, 1985	Starship	"We Built This City"	Grunt/RCA	2	
585	November 30, 1985	Phil Collins and Marilyn Martin	"Separate Lives"	Atlantic	1	
586	December 7, 1985	Mr. Mister	"Broken Wings"	RCA	2	
587	December 21, 1985	Lionel Richie	"Say You, Say Me"	Motown	4	
1986
588	January 18, 1986	Dionne & Friends^{1}	"That's What Friends Are For"♪ (1986)	Arista	4	
589	February 15, 1986	Whitney Houston	"How Will I Know"	Arista	2	
590	March 1, 1986	Mr. Mister	"Kyrie"	RCA	2	
591	March 15, 1986	Starship	"Sara"	Grunt/RCA	1	
592	March 22, 1986	Heart	"These Dreams"	Capitol	1	
593	March 29, 1986	Falco	"Rock Me Amadeus"	A&M	3	
594	April 19, 1986	Prince and The Revolution	"Kiss"	Warner Bros.	2	
595	May 3, 1986	Robert Palmer	"Addicted to Love"	Island	1	
596	May 10, 1986	Pet Shop Boys	"West End Girls"	EMI	1	
597	May 17, 1986	Whitney Houston	"Greatest Love of All"	Arista	3	
598	June 7, 1986	Madonna	"Live to Tell"	Warner Bros.	1	
599	June 14, 1986	Patti LaBelle and Michael McDonald	"On My Own"	MCA	3	
600	July 5, 1986	Billy Ocean	"There'll Be Sad Songs (To Make You Cry)"	Arista	1	
601	July 12, 1986	Simply Red	"Holding Back the Years"	Elektra	1	
602	July 19, 1986	Genesis	"Invisible Touch"	Atlantic	1	
603	July 26, 1986	Peter Gabriel	"Sledgehammer"	Warner Bros.	1	
604	August 2, 1986	Peter Cetera	"Glory of Love"	Warner Bros.	2	
605	August 16, 1986	Madonna	"Papa Don't Preach"	Warner Bros.	2	
606	August 30, 1986	Steve Winwood	"Higher Love"	Island	1	
607	September 6, 1986	Bananarama	"Venus"	London/PolyGram	1	
608	September 13, 1986	Berlin	"Take My Breath Away"	Columbia	1	
609	September 20, 1986	Huey Lewis and the News	"Stuck with You"	Chrysalis/EMI	3	
610	October 11, 1986	Janet Jackson	"When I Think of You"	A&M	2	
611	October 25, 1986	Cyndi Lauper	"True Colors"	Epic	2	
612	November 8, 1986	Boston	"Amanda"	MCA	2	
613	November 22, 1986	Human League	"Human"	A&M	1	
614	November 29, 1986	Bon Jovi	"You Give Love a Bad Name"	Mercury/PolyGram	1	
615	December 6, 1986	Peter Cetera and Amy Grant	"The Next Time I Fall"	Warner Bros.	1	
616	December 13, 1986	Bruce Hornsby & the Range	"The Way It Is"	RCA	1	
617	December 20, 1986	The Bangles	"Walk Like an Egyptian"♪ (1987)	Columbia	4	
1987
618	January 17, 1987	Gregory Abbott	"Shake You Down"	Columbia	1	
619	January 24, 1987	Billy Vera and the Beaters	"At This Moment"	Rhino	2	
620	February 7, 1987	Madonna	"Open Your Heart"	Warner Bros.	1	
621	February 14, 1987	Bon Jovi	"Livin' on a Prayer"	Mercury/PolyGram	4	
622	March 14, 1987	Huey Lewis and the News	"Jacob's Ladder"	Chrysalis/EMI	1	
623	March 21, 1987	Club Nouveau	"Lean on Me"	Warner Bros.	2	
624	April 4, 1987	Starship	"Nothing's Gonna Stop Us Now"	Grunt/RCA	2	
625	April 18, 1987	Aretha Franklin and George Michael	"I Knew You Were Waiting (For Me)"	Arista	2	
626	May 2, 1987	Cutting Crew	"(I Just) Died in Your Arms"	Virgin	2	
627	May 16, 1987	U2	"With or Without You"	Atlantic	3	
628	June 6, 1987	Kim Wilde	"You Keep Me Hangin' On"	MCA	1	
629	June 13, 1987	Atlantic Starr	"Always"	Warner Bros.	1	
630	June 20, 1987	Lisa Lisa and Cult Jam	"Head to Toe"	Columbia	1	
631	June 27, 1987	Whitney Houston	"I Wanna Dance with Somebody (Who Loves Me)"	Arista	2	
632	July 11, 1987	Heart	"Alone"	Capitol	3	
633	August 1, 1987	Bob Seger	"Shakedown"	MCA	1	
634	August 8, 1987	U2	"I Still Haven't Found What I'm Looking For"	Atlantic	2	
635	August 22, 1987	Madonna	"Who's That Girl"	Warner Bros.	1	
636	August 29, 1987	Los Lobos	"La Bamba"	Warner Bros.	3	
637	September 19, 1987	Michael Jackson with Siedah Garrett	"I Just Can't Stop Loving You"	Epic	1	
638	September 26, 1987	Whitney Houston	"Didn't We Almost Have It All"	Arista	2	
639	October 10, 1987	Whitesnake	"Here I Go Again"	Geffen	1	
640	October 17, 1987	Lisa Lisa and Cult Jam	"Lost in Emotion"	Columbia	1	
641	October 24, 1987	Michael Jackson	"Bad"	Epic	2	
642	November 7, 1987	Tiffany	"I Think We're Alone Now"	MCA	2	
643	November 21, 1987	Billy Idol	"Mony Mony"	Chrysalis/EMI	1	
644	November 28, 1987	Bill Medley and Jennifer Warnes	"(I've Had) The Time of My Life"	RCA	1	
645	December 5, 1987	Belinda Carlisle	"Heaven Is a Place on Earth"	MCA	1	
646	December 12, 1987	George Michael	"Faith"♪ (1988)	Columbia	4	
1988
647	January 9, 1988	Whitney Houston	"So Emotional"	Arista	1	
648	January 16, 1988	George Harrison	"Got My Mind Set on You"	Dark Horse/Warner Bros.	1	
649	January 23, 1988	Michael Jackson	"The Way You Make Me Feel"	Epic	1	
650	January 30, 1988	INXS	"Need You Tonight"	Atlantic	1	
651	February 6, 1988	Tiffany	"Could've Been"	MCA	2	
652	February 20, 1988	Exposé	"Seasons Change"	Arista	1	
653	February 27, 1988	George Michael	"Father Figure"	Columbia	2	
654	March 12, 1988	Rick Astley	"Never Gonna Give You Up"	RCA	2	
655	March 26, 1988	Michael Jackson	"Man in the Mirror"	Epic	2	
656	April 9, 1988	Billy Ocean	"Get Outta My Dreams, Get into My Car"	Arista	2	
657	April 23, 1988	Whitney Houston	"Where Do Broken Hearts Go"	Arista	2	
658	May 7, 1988	Terence Trent D'Arby	"Wishing Well"	Columbia	1	
659	May 14, 1988	Gloria Estefan and Miami Sound Machine	"Anything for You"	Epic	2	
660	May 28, 1988	George Michael	"One More Try"	Columbia	3	
661	June 18, 1988	Rick Astley	"Together Forever"	RCA	1	
662	June 25, 1988	Debbie Gibson	"Foolish Beat"	Atlantic	1	
663	July 2, 1988	Michael Jackson	"Dirty Diana"	Epic	1	
664	July 9, 1988	Cheap Trick	"The Flame"	Epic	2	
665	July 23, 1988	Richard Marx	"Hold On to the Nights"	EMI	1	
666	July 30, 1988	Steve Winwood	"Roll with It"	Virgin	4	
667	August 27, 1988	George Michael	"Monkey"	Columbia	2	
668	September 10, 1988	Guns N' Roses	"Sweet Child o' Mine"	Geffen	2	
669	September 24, 1988	Bobby McFerrin	"Don't Worry, Be Happy"	EMI-Manhattan	2	
670	October 8, 1988	Def Leppard	"Love Bites"	Mercury/PolyGram	1	
671	October 15, 1988	UB40	"Red Red Wine"	A&M	1	
672	October 22, 1988	Phil Collins	"A Groovy Kind of Love"	Atlantic	2	
673	November 5, 1988	The Beach Boys	"Kokomo"	Elektra	1	
674	November 12, 1988	The Escape Club	"Wild, Wild West"	Atlantic	1	
675	November 19, 1988	Bon Jovi	"Bad Medicine"	Mercury/PolyGram	2	
676	December 3, 1988	Will to Power	"Baby, I Love Your Way / Freebird Medley (Free Baby)"	Epic	1	
677	December 10, 1988	Chicago	"Look Away"♪ (1989)	Full Moon/Reprise	2	
678	December 24, 1988	Poison	"Every Rose Has Its Thorn"	Capitol	3	
1989
679	January 14, 1989	Bobby Brown	"My Prerogative"	MCA	1	
680	January 21, 1989	Phil Collins	"Two Hearts"	Atlantic	2	
681	February 4, 1989	Sheriff	"When I'm with You"	Capitol	1	
682	February 11, 1989	Paula Abdul	"Straight Up"	Virgin	3	
683	March 4, 1989	Debbie Gibson	"Lost in Your Eyes"	Atlantic	3	
684	March 25, 1989	Mike + The Mechanics	"The Living Years"	Atlantic	1	
685	April 1, 1989	The Bangles	"Eternal Flame"	Columbia	1	
686	April 8, 1989	Roxette	"The Look"	EMI	1	
687	April 15, 1989	Fine Young Cannibals	"She Drives Me Crazy"	MCA	1	
688	April 22, 1989	Madonna	"Like a Prayer"	Warner Bros.	3	
689	May 13, 1989	Bon Jovi	"I'll Be There for You"	Mercury/PolyGram	1	
690	May 20, 1989	Paula Abdul	"Forever Your Girl"	Virgin	2	
691	June 3, 1989	Michael Damian	"Rock On"	A&M	1	
692	June 10, 1989	Bette Midler	"Wind Beneath My Wings"	Atlantic	1	
693	June 17, 1989	New Kids on the Block	"I'll Be Loving You (Forever)"	Columbia	1	
694	June 24, 1989	Richard Marx	"Satisfied"	EMI	1	
695	July 1, 1989	Milli Vanilli	"Baby Don't Forget My Number"	Arista	1	
696	July 8, 1989	Fine Young Cannibals	"Good Thing"	MCA	1	
697	July 15, 1989	Simply Red	"If You Don't Know Me by Now"	Elektra	1	
698	July 22, 1989	Martika	"Toy Soldiers"	Columbia	2	
699	August 5, 1989	Prince	"Batdance"	Warner Bros.	1	
700	August 12, 1989	Richard Marx	"Right Here Waiting"	EMI	3	
701	September 2, 1989	Paula Abdul	"Cold Hearted"	Virgin	1	
702	September 9, 1989	New Kids on the Block	"Hangin' Tough"	Columbia	1	
703	September 16, 1989	Gloria Estefan	"Don't Wanna Lose You"	Epic	1	
704	September 23, 1989	Milli Vanilli	"Girl I'm Gonna Miss You"	Arista	2	
705	October 7, 1989	Janet Jackson	"Miss You Much"	A&M	4	
706	November 4, 1989	Roxette	"Listen to Your Heart"	EMI	1	
707	November 11, 1989	Bad English	"When I See You Smile"	Epic	2	
708	November 25, 1989	Milli Vanilli	"Blame It on the Rain"	Arista	2	
709	December 9, 1989	Billy Joel	"We Didn't Start the Fire"	Columbia	2	
710	December 23, 1989	Phil Collins	"Another Day in Paradise"	Atlantic	4	

Notes
^{1} "That's What Friends Are For" was performed by singers Dionne Warwick, Elton John, Gladys Knight and Stevie Wonder, all of whom are also credited individually for the song on the Billboard charts.

== Statistics by decade ==
=== Artist by total number-one singles ===
The following artists achieved four or more number-one hits during the 1980s.

Artist	Number ones
Michael Jackson	9
Madonna	7
Whitney Houston	7
Phil Collins	7
George Michael	5
Lionel Richie	5
Daryl Hall & John Oates	5
Stevie Wonder	4
Bon Jovi	4
Prince	4

- Note: For singer George Michael, if Wham! is included, this would give George Michael eight number-one songs.
- Note: For singer Phil Collins, if Genesis is included, this would give Phil Collins eight number-one songs.

=== Artists by total number of weeks at number one ===
The following artists were featured in top of the chart for the highest total number of weeks during the 1980s.

Artist	Weeks at number one
Michael Jackson	27
Lionel Richie	21
Paul McCartney	16
George Michael	16
Stevie Wonder	15
Madonna	15
Olivia Newton-John	14
Diana Ross	13
Whitney Houston	13
Phil Collins	13

- George Michael's duet with Aretha Franklin as well as the song "Careless Whisper", where he is credited as a featured artist (internationally, he is credited solo on this record), are counted towards his total number of weeks. His other two number ones with Wham!—"Wake Me Up Before You Go-Go" and "Everything She Wants"—are not counted.
- When adding the weeks for all of Phil Collins' number-one singles during the 1980s, it comes out to 15. (This does not include the Genesis song "Invisible Touch".) However, "Another Day in Paradise" spent its final two weeks at number one in 1990—January 6 and 13—so those two weeks do not count toward his tally in the 1980s.

=== Songs by total number of weeks at number one ===
The following songs were featured in top of the chart for the highest total number of weeks during the 1980s.

Weeks at number one	Song	Artist(s)
10	"Physical"	Olivia Newton-John
9	"Bette Davis Eyes"	Kim Carnes
9	"Endless Love"	Diana Ross and Lionel Richie
8	"Every Breath You Take"	The Police
7	"I Love Rock 'n' Roll"	Joan Jett and the Blackhearts
7	"Ebony and Ivory"	Paul McCartney and Stevie Wonder
7	"Billie Jean"	Michael Jackson
6	"Call Me"	Blondie
6	"Lady"	Kenny Rogers
6	"Centerfold"	The J. Geils Band
6	"Eye of the Tiger"	Survivor
6	"Flashdance... What a Feeling"	Irene Cara
6	"Say, Say, Say"	Paul McCartney and Michael Jackson
6	"Like a Virgin"	Madonna

== See also ==
- List of UK Singles Chart number ones of the 1980s
- List of number-one hits (United States)
- 1980s in music
