= Billboard Year-End Hot 100 singles of 1987 =

Ranking of recorded music

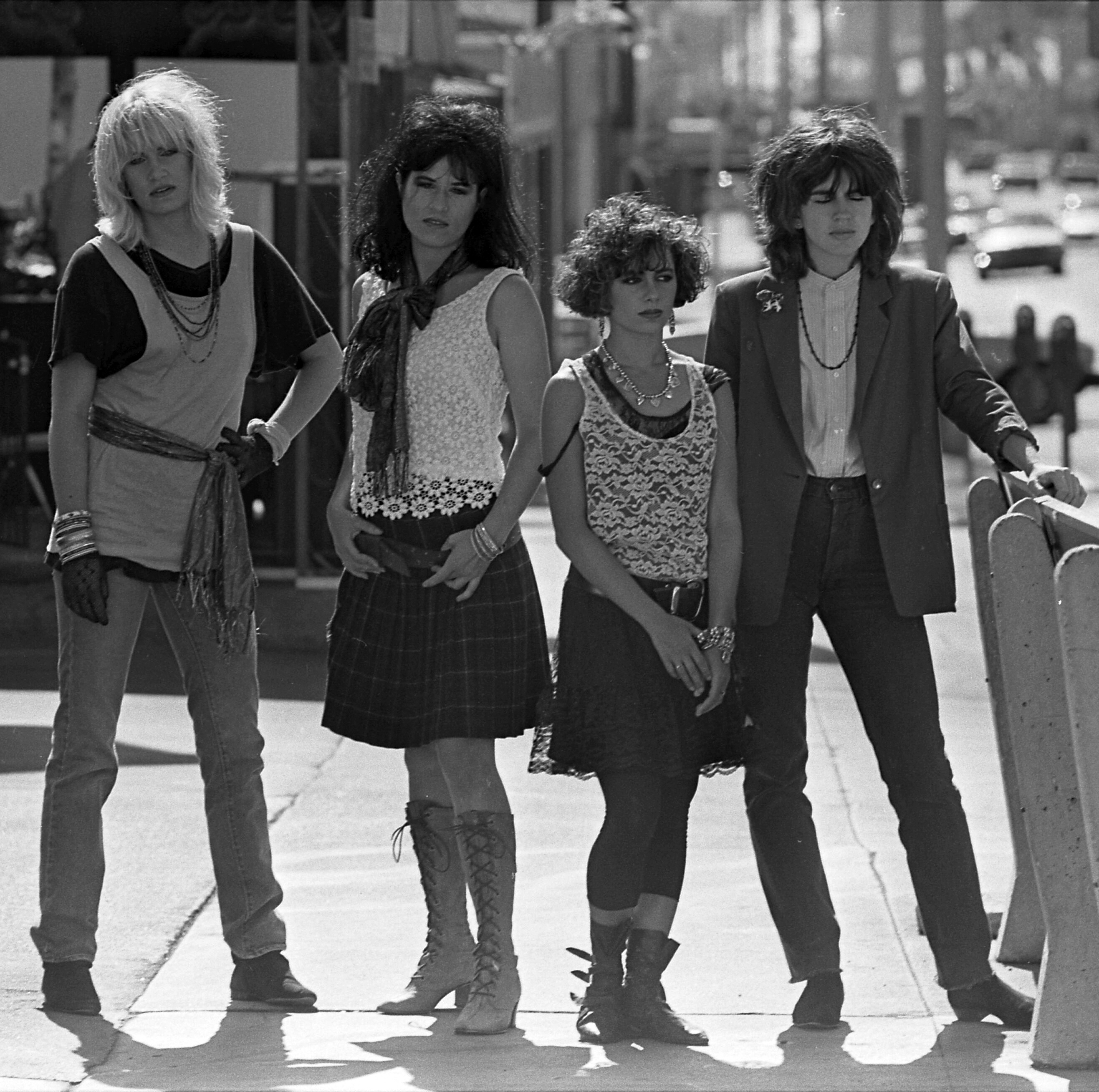
"Walk Like an Egyptian" by The Bangles was the number one song of 1987.

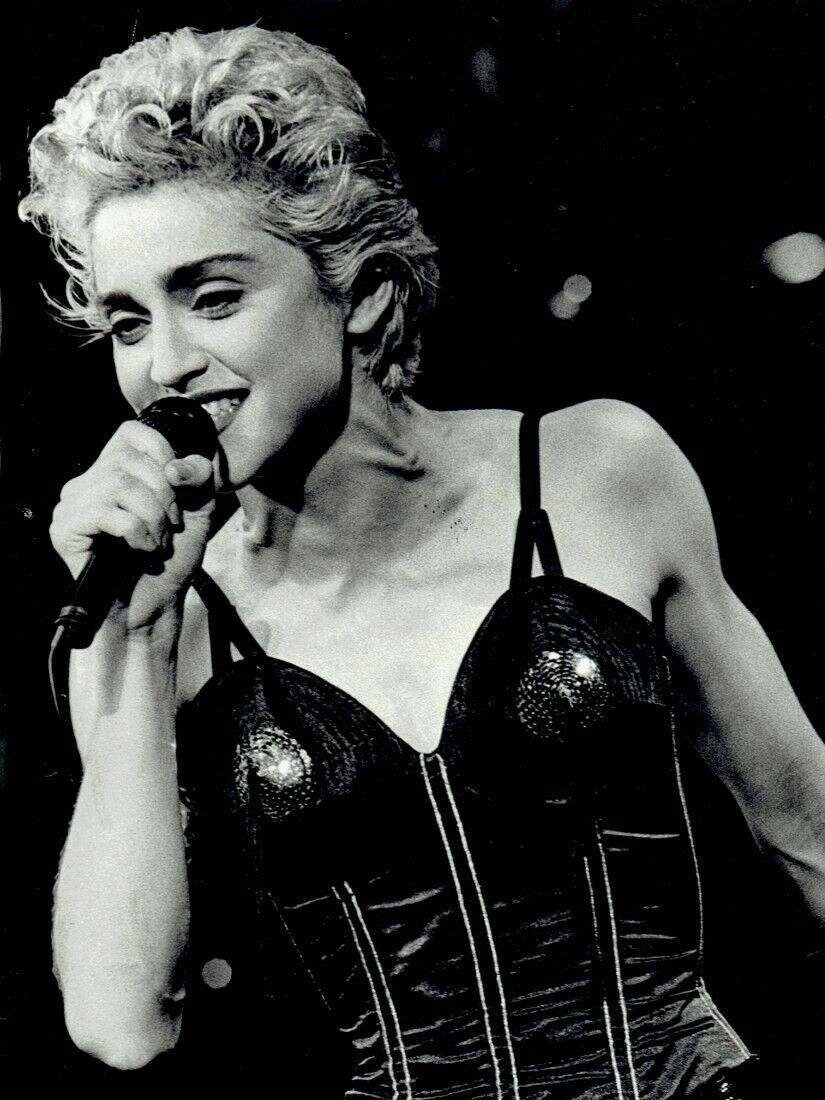
Madonna had four songs on the Year-End Hot 100, the most of any artist in 1987.

This is a list of Billboard magazine's Top Hot 100 songs of 1987.

No.	Title	Artist(s)
1	"Walk Like an Egyptian"	The Bangles
2	"Alone"	Heart
3	"Shake You Down"	Gregory Abbott
4	"I Wanna Dance with Somebody (Who Loves Me)"	Whitney Houston
5	"Nothing's Gonna Stop Us Now"	Starship
6	"C'est la Vie"	Robbie Nevil
7	"Here I Go Again"	Whitesnake
8	"The Way It Is"	Bruce Hornsby and the Range
9	"Shakedown"	Bob Seger
10	"Livin' on a Prayer"	Bon Jovi
11	"La Bamba"	Los Lobos
12	"Everybody Have Fun Tonight"	Wang Chung
13	"Don't Dream It's Over"	Crowded House
14	"Always"	Atlantic Starr
15	"With or Without You"	U2
16	"Looking for a New Love"	Jody Watley
17	"Head to Toe"	Lisa Lisa and Cult Jam
18	"I Think We're Alone Now"	Tiffany
19	"Mony Mony"	Billy Idol
20	"At This Moment"	Billy Vera and the Beaters
21	"The Lady in Red"	Chris de Burgh
22	"Didn't We Almost Have It All"	Whitney Houston
23	"I Still Haven't Found What I'm Looking For"	U2
24	"I Want Your Sex"	George Michael
25	"Notorious"	Duran Duran
26	"Only in My Dreams"	Debbie Gibson
27	"(I've Had) The Time of My Life"	Bill Medley and Jennifer Warnes
28	"The Next Time I Fall"	Peter Cetera and Amy Grant
29	"Lean on Me"	Club Nouveau
30	"Open Your Heart"	Madonna
31	"Lost in Emotion"	Lisa Lisa and Cult Jam
32	"(I Just) Died in Your Arms"	Cutting Crew
33	"Heart and Soul"	T'Pau
34	"You Keep Me Hangin' On"	Kim Wilde
35	"Keep Your Hands to Yourself"	The Georgia Satellites
36	"I Knew You Were Waiting (For Me)"	Aretha Franklin and George Michael
37	"Control"	Janet Jackson
38	"U Got the Look"	Prince
39	"Somewhere Out There"	Linda Ronstadt and James Ingram
40	"Land of Confusion"	Genesis
41	"Jacob's Ladder"	Huey Lewis and the News
42	"Who's That Girl"	Madonna
43	"You Got It All"	The Jets
44	"Touch Me (I Want Your Body)"	Samantha Fox
45	"I Just Can't Stop Loving You"	Michael Jackson with Siedah Garrett
46	"Causing a Commotion"	Madonna
47	"In Too Deep"	Genesis
48	"Let's Wait Awhile"	Janet Jackson
49	"Hip to Be Square"	Huey Lewis and the News
50	"Will You Still Love Me?"	Chicago
51	"Little Lies"	Fleetwood Mac
52	"Luka"	Suzanne Vega
53	"I Heard a Rumour"	Bananarama
54	"Don't Mean Nothing"	Richard Marx
55	"Songbird"	Kenny G
56	"Carrie"	Europe
57	"Don't Disturb This Groove"	The System
58	"La Isla Bonita"	Madonna
59	"Bad"	Michael Jackson
60	"Sign o' the Times"	Prince
61	"Change of Heart"	Cyndi Lauper
62	"Come Go with Me"	Exposé
63	"Can't We Try"	Dan Hill featuring Vonda Shepard
64	"To Be a Lover"	Billy Idol
65	"Mandolin Rain"	Bruce Hornsby and the Range
66	"Breakout"	Swing Out Sister
67	"Stand by Me"	Ben E. King
68	"Tonight, Tonight, Tonight"	Genesis
69	"Someday"	Glass Tiger
70	"When Smokey Sings"	ABC
71	"Casanova"	LeVert
72	"Rhythm Is Gonna Get You"	Gloria Estefan and Miami Sound Machine
73	"Rock Steady"	The Whispers
74	"Wanted Dead or Alive"	Bon Jovi
75	"Big Time"	Peter Gabriel
76	"The Finer Things"	Steve Winwood
77	"Let Me Be the One"	Exposé
78	"Is This Love"	Survivor
79	"Diamonds"	Herb Alpert
80	"Point of No Return"	Exposé
81	"Big Love"	Fleetwood Mac
82	"Midnight Blue"	Lou Gramm
83	"Something So Strong"	Crowded House
84	"Heat of the Night"	Bryan Adams
85	"Nothing's Gonna Change My Love for You"	Glenn Medeiros
86	"Brilliant Disguise"	Bruce Springsteen
87	"Just to See Her"	Smokey Robinson
88	"Who Will You Run To"	Heart
89	"Respect Yourself"	Bruce Willis
90	"Cross My Broken Heart"	The Jets
91	"Victory"	Kool & the Gang
92	"Don't Get Me Wrong"	The Pretenders
93	"Doing It All for My Baby"	Huey Lewis and the News
94	"Right on Track"	Breakfast Club
95	"Ballerina Girl"	Lionel Richie
96	"Meet Me Half Way"	Kenny Loggins
97	"I've Been in Love Before"	Cutting Crew
98	"(You Gotta) Fight for Your Right (To Party!)"	Beastie Boys
99	"Funkytown"	Pseudo Echo
100	"Love You Down"	Ready for the World

== See also ==
- 1987 in music
- Billboard Year-End Hot Black Singles of 1987
- List of Billboard Hot 100 number ones of 1987
- List of Billboard Hot 100 top-ten singles in 1987
