= Didn't We Almost Have It All =

Single by Whitney Houston

from the album Whitney
- B-side: "Shock Me" (Special Collector's Bonus Cut)
- Released: July 1987
- Recorded: 1986
- Studio: Devonshire (Los Angeles, CA); Leed's L'Mobile (Los Angeles, CA); Hitsville U.S.A. (West Hollywood, CA); Sigma Sound (New York, NY); The Plant (Sausalito, CA)
- Genre: Orchestral pop; R&B; soul
- Length: 5:05 (album version); 4:38 (single version)
- Label: Arista
- Songwriters: Michael Masser; Will Jennings
- Producer: Michael Masser

Whitney Houston singles chronology
"I Wanna Dance with Somebody (Who Loves Me)" (1987)	"Didn't We Almost Have It All" (1987)	"So Emotional" (1987)

Music video
- "Didn't We Almost Have It All" on YouTube

"Didn't We Almost Have It All" is a song recorded by American singer Whitney Houston for her second studio album, Whitney (1987). The song was written by Michael Masser and Will Jennings and produced by Masser, his fifth released production for Houston, and vocally arranged by Houston herself.

Initially, Houston's cover version of the Isley Brothers' "For the Love of You" was intended to be released as the second single from the album. However, the record label decided to release "Didn't We Almost Have It All", believing all Houston's material should be original. The song was released as the second single off the Whitney album in July 1987 by Arista Records.

A live performance from her September 2, 1987 concert in Saratoga Springs, New York was used alongside her performance of "I Wanna Dance with Somebody (Who Loves Me)" at the 1987 MTV Video Music Awards on September 11. Subsequently, the video was used as the "official" video and aired on MTV, VH1 and BET.

The song was featured on five Houston compilations — Whitney: The Greatest Hits, Love, Whitney, The Ultimate Collection, WH1TNEY and I Will Always Love You: The Best of Whitney Houston, with the former four including the single version and the latter including the full-length album version.

"Didn't We Almost Have It All" received positive reviews from music critics, who praised its lyrics, production, and Houston's vocal performance. It became Houston's fifth consecutive chart topper on the US Billboard Hot 100, staying there for two weeks and tying her at the time with Elvis Presley and the Supremes for the most consecutive number one singles at the time. It also reached the top 10 in various countries.

"Didn't We Almost Have It All" was nominated for the Song of the Year at the 30th Annual Grammy Awards. Various outlets including Forbes and Hits Daily Double listed the song as one of her greatest vocal recordings.

== Background ==
As early as June 1986, following the success of Houston's landmark self-titled debut album, her label president Clive Davis requested submissions for Houston's sophomore album. That month, Davis received several songs from Michael Masser, the composer and producer of the hits "Saving All My Love for You", "All at Once" and "Greatest Love of All". Two of the songs he sent -- "You're Still My Man" (written with Gerry Goffin) and "Didn't We Almost Have It All" (written with Will Jennings) -- were eventually approved by Houston and Davis for the album.

Like Masser, Jennings had previously worked with Davis, helping to pen fellow Arista artist Barry Manilow's "Looks Like We Made It" as well as another Arista act, Dionne Warwick's "I'll Never Love This Way Again". Also like Masser, Jennings composed an Academy Award-nominated movie anthem, "Up Where We Belong", a number one hit for Joe Cocker and Jennifer Warnes. The song would be the first time the two worked together.

== Development and composition ==
Jennings recalls that the songwriting process for "Didn't We Almost Have It All" required several years. "It seems like Michael Masser and I worked off and on for years on that song. I don't know how many times I rewrote bits and pieces of the tune ... I remember distinctly that we ran (up) over two hundred dollars worth of phone calls from a hotel in Nashville ... of course, it was well worth it in the end."

Jennings told Songfacts that the song took longer to be finished than most compositions because of Masser's busy schedule, stating "I think that probably took longer than any other song. Michael was traveling and he was in the studio and doing this and that, so I think it was about a year or two after we started it that it was finished."

Jennings claimed due to this, he "lost track of the whole thing" and stated that Masser's perfectionism in "want[ing] to really nail it down", played a part into why it was a difficult process, calling it "one of those never-to-be-repeated experiences". Jennings told the same website that the song was "about wishing for reunion with someone, and making the case for it by recalling past good times." Houston performed an early version of the ballad live throughout the duration of her debut headlining world tour.

The Telegraph claimed the song was reportedly inspired by Houston's on-and-off-again relationship with American Philadelphia Eagles football star Randall Cunningham.

According to the sheet music published by Blue Sky Rider Songs and Universal Music Group, "Didn't We Almost Have It All" has a slow tempo with 60 beats per minute. The song starts and mainly stays in the key of B♭ major but shifts to G major at the beginning of the chorus before returning, repeating it in the second chorus before finishing in its original key. Houston's vocal range in the song spans from the low note of B♭_{3} to the high note of E♭_{5}. Lee Holdridge and Robbie Buchanan were the arrangers of the song and helped to give the power ballad an orchestral pop sound. Houston was the song's vocal arranger.

== Release ==
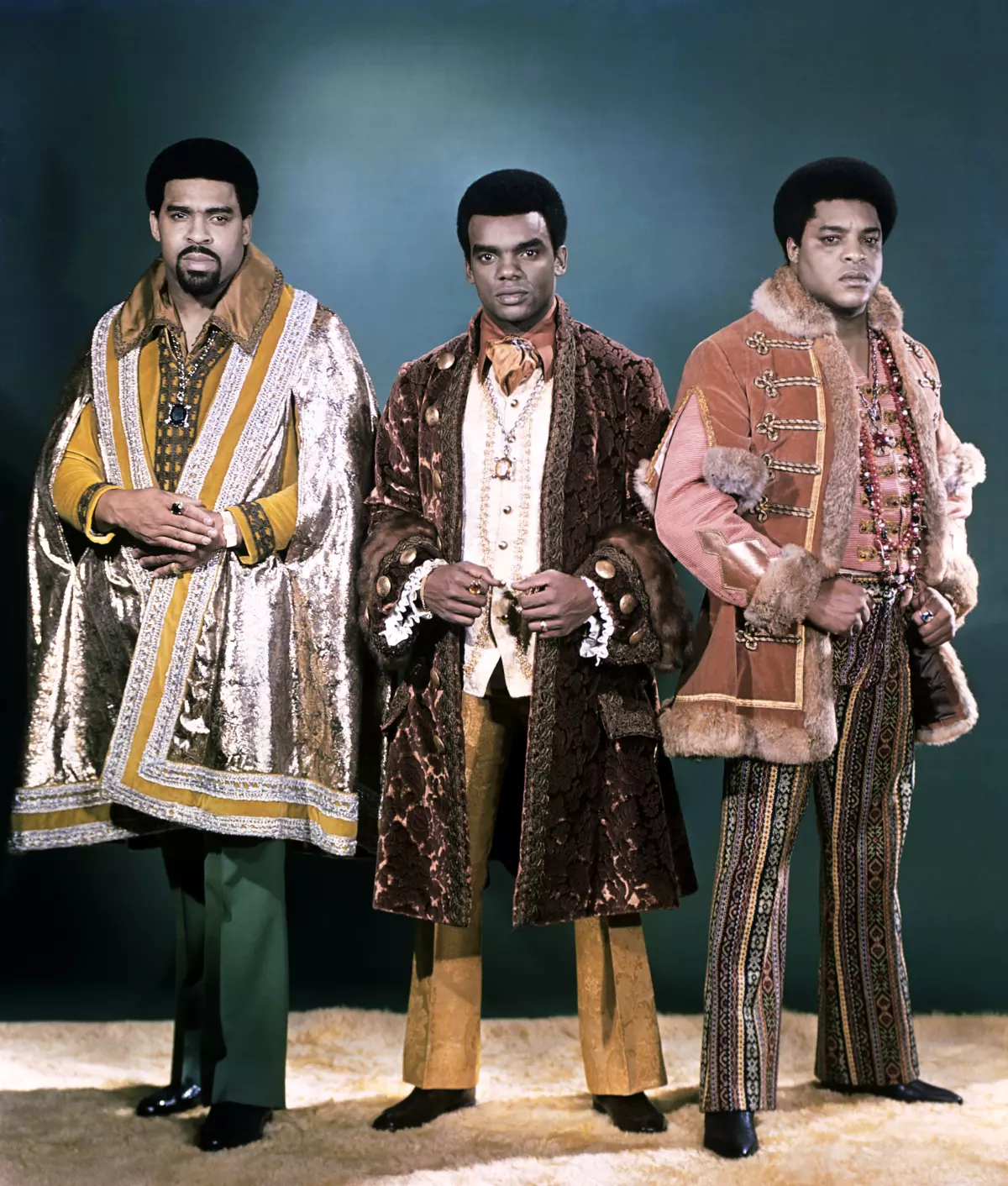
The song was released after Clive Davis decided at the last minute not to release Houston's rendition of "For the Love of You" by the Isley Brothers (pictured in 1969) as the single.

Initially, there were no plans to release the song as a single on the album. At the time, Arista had begun planning to release Houston's rendition of the Isley Brothers' 1975 smooth soul ballad hit "For the Love of You" as the follow-up to Houston's previous hit, "I Wanna Dance with Somebody (Who Loves Me)", which success had been massive and increased Houston's international status. It had actually been the first song recorded for the album and produced by Narada Michael Walden. Houston herself had included the song in the North American leg of her Moment of Truth World Tour.

But at the last minute, Davis changed direction. At the time, Houston had developed a reputation as a "covers" act as two of her big hits – "Saving All My Love for You" and "Greatest Love of All" – had been renditions of previously recorded material. Davis wanted more original material released and decided "Didn't We Almost Have It All" had the best chance to top the pop charts, especially due to the hit-making potential of Jennings' and Masser's previous works.

At the time, Houston had made history as the first female artist to record four consecutive number one singles and the producer wanted the pattern to repeat. "For the Love of You" still managed some success and acknowledgement, later winning Houston the Grammy Award nomination for Best Female R&B Vocal Performance in 1988. It also became the b-side of Houston's follow-up hit, "So Emotional" in Europe, and as the b-side of Houston's "Run to You" in the US, where it was granted heavy airplay on R&B radio stations in 1993. It also found moderate chart success in New Zealand, peaking at number 35 in September 1996, nine years after its recording.

"Didn't We Almost Have It All" was released in July 1987 just as "I Wanna Dance with Somebody" began peaking on the global charts and featured the Jermaine Jackson duet, "Shock Me", a synth-rock tune produced by Michael Omartian that the pair recorded back in 1984, as its b-side. The dance tune had been first placed in the soundtrack to the Jamie Lee Curtis and John Travolta 1985 vehicle, Perfect, which became Houston's first appearance singing in a film soundtrack.

=== Critical reception ===
About.com ranked the song number 7 in their list of "Top 20 Best Whitney Houston Songs". Editor Bill Lamb deemed it "a big, emotional production that pulls out all of the stops vocally". Rob Wynn of AllMusic highlighted the song in his review of the Whitney album. Los Angeles Times editor Robert Hilburn wrote, "Houston's stardom will be boosted most by "Didn't We Almost Have It All", a sweeping Masser-Will Jennings ballad with the kind of big, emotional finish that will make Liza and hundreds of other singers wish they had been given first crack at the song. I'll save my champagne for pop singers who don't add that overblown song to their repertoire." Pop Rescue noted it as "an 80s power ballad", adding that Houston's "vocals take centre stage" on the song.

Rolling Stone's Vince Alleti wrote, "Masser reprises the show-tune schmaltz of "Greatest Love of All" in his even cornier "Didn't We Almost Have It All". According to Whitney fanpage, "But there is a cut on the album whose title inadvertently sums up Houston at this stage of her development -- "Didn't We Almost Have It All". St. Petersburg Times editors Eric Snider and Annelise Wamsley described "Didn't We Almost Have It All" as "an overblown tune co-written by Michael Masser (...) that finds Houston stripped of subtlety - with her wire-to-wire belting, you can just see the fetching songstress looking skyward, arms outstretched."

In his column post about every number one Billboard Hot 100 hit, Tom Breihan of Stereogum called the ballad among Masser's other ballads he gave Houston "the sorts of tastefully sleepy howlers that seem custom-designed for banks and credit-card companies to use as hold music. They’re numb, reassuring nothings, made without pulse or rhythm or urgency. It takes an extremely gifted person to elevate songs like those. Whitney Houston was an extremely gifted person," acknowledging Houston's talent in delivering on the song. Breihan compared the studio version to Houston's Saratoga Springs performance of the song, preferring the latter to the former, writing "Houston uses the song’s melody as a mere suggestion, and she comes up with her own runs and ad-libs and exhortations. You can see her starting to gain steam as the song trundles along, until she’s wailing out her own embellishments: “Didn’t we! Didn’t we!” On the record, she never fully takes flight like that, but she still delivers the song with gale-force determination. If “Didn’t We Almost Have It All” is a worthwhile song at all, it's because Houston made it worthwhile through sheer sense of will, using her vocal firepower to give a sense of drama."

Breihan also felt due to Houston being just 23 at the time of its recording and subsequent release that she was too young to sing a song like "Didn't We Almost Have It All", explaining "it’s a grown-up song, in both execution and subject matter. Musically, “Didn’t We Almost Have It All” is sleepy and obvious, full of strings and glassy pianos and watery guitars. Lyrically, it's a look back on a long-dormant relationship... at this stage of her career, [Houston] was absolutely transcendent when singing about things being new and exciting, and that's probably because she herself was new and exciting."

=== Chart performance ===
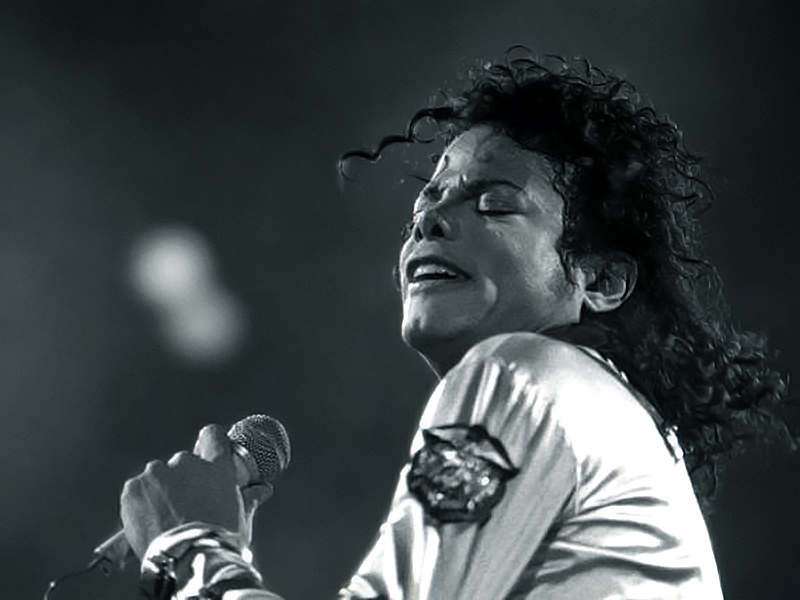
"Didn't We Almost Have It All" replaced Michael Jackson's hit "I Just Can't Stop Loving You" at number one on the Billboard Hot 100.

"Didn't We Almost Have It All" debuted at No. 50 as the "Hot Shot Debut" on the Billboard Hot 100 for the week of August 1, 1987, a week later, it entered the top 40. On its fifth week, it entered the top ten at number 8. Four weeks later, it reached number one for the beginning of two weeks, from September 26 to October 3, 1987, becoming her fifth consecutive number one on the Billboard Hot 100, replacing Michael Jackson's "I Just Can't Stop Loving You" at the top spot.

This accomplishment made her just the fifth artist in chart history to score five consecutive number one singles on the Billboard Hot 100. Houston also became the first act - and first solo artist in history to have two consecutive number one albums with multiple singles topping the Hot 100 joining the Bee Gees in achieving the then-rare feat as they had done it a decade earlier with the multi-artist soundtrack, Saturday Night Fever, and their own Spirits Having Flown.

Houston also became the first black musical act since The Supremes two decades before to have five consecutive number ones. The accomplishment also tied her with Elvis Presley for the most consecutive number one hits on the Hot 100 by a solo artist, as well as the first female solo artist in history to achieve five number ones in a row. It was Masser's fifth and last number one single and Jennings' fourth.

The song also topped both component charts, the Hot 100 Singles Sales and Hot 100 Airplay, Houston's fourth song (and fourth consecutive release) to do so. The single stayed in the top 10 for 7 weeks and the top 40 for 13 weeks and 17 weeks on the chart in all. The song topped the Adult Contemporary chart for three weeks. It was her fifth song to peak at number one on the AC chart and her fifth consecutive release to do so. It also reached number two on the Hot Black Singles chart for a single week (October 10, 1987), behind "(You're Puttin') A Rush on Me" by Stephanie Mills. The song also peaked at number two on the magazine's Crossover Top 30 chart.

Internationally, the song hit the top ten in several markets, and reached the top 20 in the United Kingdom (#14); Switzerland (#18); and West Germany (#20). Due to its overall performance in Europe, the song peaked at number ten on the Eurochart Hot 100, becoming her third top ten single on that chart.

It was her fifth number one single on the Billboard Hot 100, her fourth on the Hot 100 Singles Sales chart, her fourth on the Hot 100 Airplay, and her fifth on the Adult Contemporary chart.

== Live performances ==
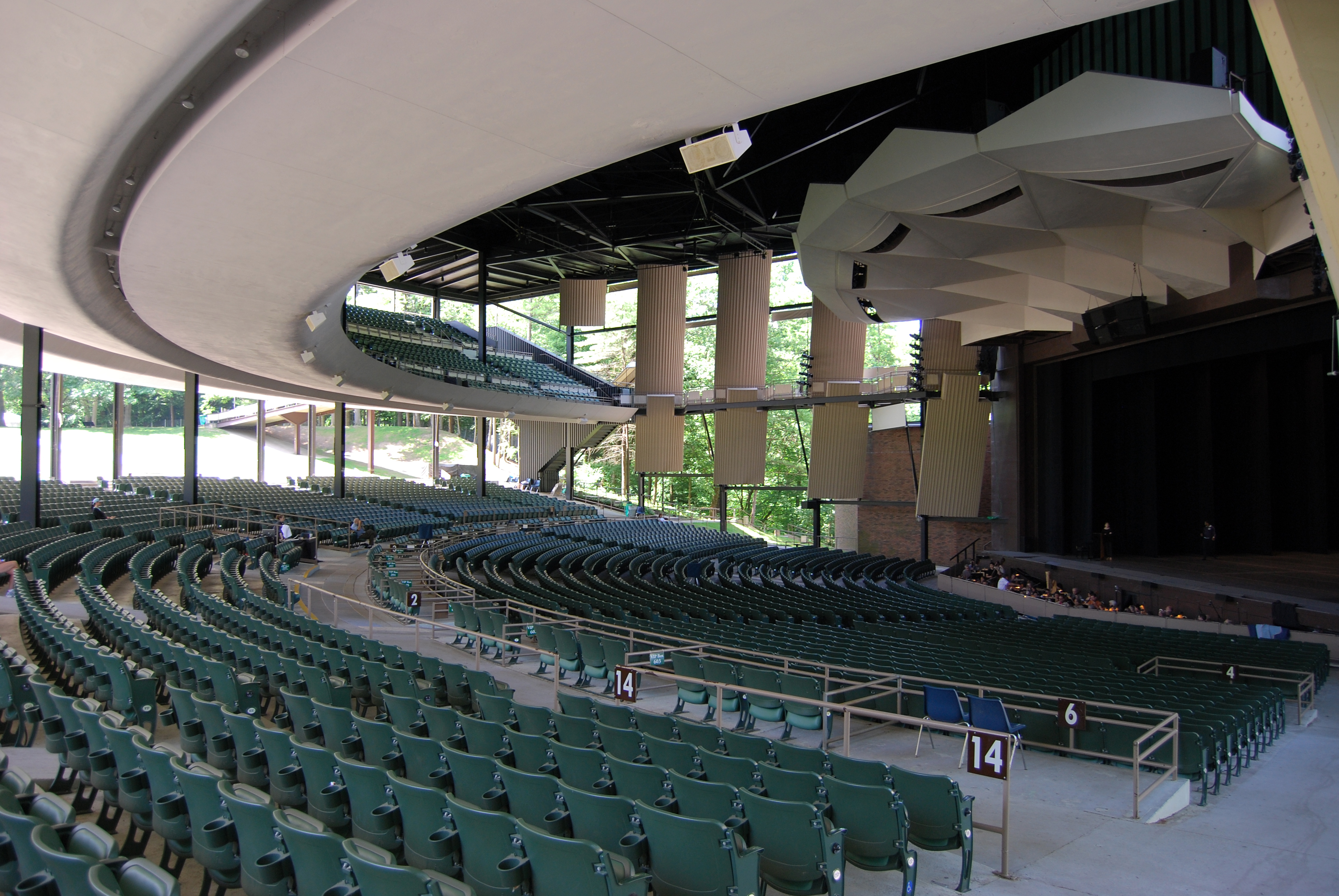
Houston gave her now-famous live performance of the song at the Saratoga Performing Arts Center in Saratoga Springs, New York.

Prior to the release of Whitney, Houston performed the ballad in selected dates of her Greatest Love World Tour in 1986.

During the North American leg of her Moment of Truth World Tour in 1987, Houston sent a taped performance of the song during a September 2 concert at the Saratoga Performing Arts Center in Saratoga Springs, New York to MTV producers to air during the 1987 MTV Video Music Awards on September 11 of the year.

Prior to the show, MTV, VH1 and BET all used the clip as the "official" music video for the ballad. On MTV, it debuted and reached active rotation on the channel on September 9.

It was also one of two songs Houston performed during the 1987 Special Olympics Summer Games back in July 1987. Houston also performed it live during the Nelson Mandela 70th Birthday Tribute at Wembley Stadium in London.

During the Moment of Truth World Tour, Houston performed the song in a full, down pitched and downtempo soulful gospel-influenced version. In subsequent tours up until the 1998 European Tour, the song was placed in "The Love Medley", featuring Houston's other classic love ballads, adding it as the third song in between other songs in the medley. Houston often performed the "Love Medley" in live broadcasts, including the Welcome Home Heroes with Whitney Houston HBO-TV special.

== Legacy ==
=== Accolades and achievements ===
The song was nominated for the Grammy Award for Song of the Year at the 30th Annual Grammy Awards in March 1988, losing to "Somewhere Out There" from the animated film, An American Tail. Due to its success on the Billboard Hot 100, the ballad was ranked the 22nd best performed song on the year-end list. On the Hot Black Singles year-end list, it was ranked 38th place. On the adult contemporary year-end list, it ranked 7th.

In March 2012, following Houston's death, the track re-entered the Billboard charts, reaching number 58 on the Digital Song Sales chart, staying for a week. The same song entered the Hot R&B/Hip-Hop Digital Song Sales chart in the last week of February 2012 and peaked at number 20. It also re-entered the official charts in Australia and the United Kingdom, becoming the sixth and thirteenth single overall to simultaneously chart in the respective countries' official record charts.

In 2020, the song was certified gold by the Recording Industry Association of America for combined sales-streams units of 500,000 equivalent units. Three years later, in 2023, it was certified silver by the British Phonographic Industry for sales of 200,000 equivalent units.

=== Retrospective critical accolades ===
Following Houston's death in 2012, Entertainment Weekly published a list of her 25 best songs and ranked "Didn't We Almost Have it All" number 16. The A.V. Club placed the song as one of Houston's fifteen best songs (that aren't "I Will Always Love You"), calling it "an undefeated track for sobbing in a parked car", further writing that the song "perfectly matches the longing Houston conjures in her voice." BET voted it the fifth best Whitney Houston song out of 40. Forbes voted the ballad the 14th best Houston song from 20 recordings. The ballad was ranked songwriter Masser's sixth best composition by The Telegraph. Smooth Radio ranked the ballad Houston's sixth greatest song. About.com ranked the song as the seventh best Houston song.

In their list of twenty essential vocal performances by black music artists in 2025, Hits Daily Double said Houston's performance of the song "opened up a new category [for the singer]: grandiose ballads designed to showcase her vocal pyrotechnics, a style that would define pop for decades to come", further adding that the song was "a heartbreak song delivered with the intensity of opera, as Houston's precise execution gives the polite adult-contemporary pop a real emotional thrust."

=== Covers and uses in media ===
The song was covered 27 times, making it one of Houston's most covered songs of her catalog. Among the most prominent covers included acts such as Filipino singer Jamie Rivera, Turkish singer Neşe Karaböcek and Jamaican reggae singer Pliers, all of whom recorded the ballad almost immediately after its release in 1987. An orchestral instrumental by the London Philharmonic Orchestra was also recorded.

In his 2015 interview with Yahoo, wrestler and actor Dwayne Johnson said that he listened to the ballad to get prepared for emotional scenes in the film San Andreas.

The Grey's Anatomy episode, Didn't We Almost Have It All?, was inspired by Houston's hit. The song was the title of a 2021 Lifetime documentary on the lives of Houston and her late daughter Bobbi Kristina Brown, titled Whitney Houston & Bobbi Kristina: Didn't We Almost Have It All as well as the title of the Gerrick Kennedy book on Houston, Didn't We Almost Have It All: In Defense of Whitney Houston (2022).

== Track listings and formats ==
- US, 7" Vinyl single
1. "Didn't We Almost Have It All" – 4:56
2. "Shock Me" (Duet with Jermaine Jackson) – 5:05 ^{A}
- UK, 7" Vinyl single
1. "Didn't We Almost Have It All" (Edit Remix) – 4:20
2. "For the Love of You" – 4:32
- UK, CD maxi-single
1. "Didn't We Almost Have It All" – 5:05
2. "I Wanna Dance With Somebody (Who Loves Me)" (a cappella Mix) – 6:28
3. "Shock Me" (Collector's Bonus Cut) – 5:03 ^{A}
- Australia, New Zealand 7" Vinyl single
1. "Didn't We Almost Have It All" (Edit Remix) – 3:59
2. "Shock Me" – 5:05
- Spain, 12" Vinyl maxi-single
1. "Didn't We Almost Have It All" – 5:05
2. "I Wanna Dance With Somebody (Who Loves Me)" (a cappella Mix) – 5:18
3. "Shock Me" (Collector's Bonus Cut) – 5:03 ^{A}

^{A} "Shock Me" - Written by Andrew Goldmark and Bruce Roberts. Produced by Michael Omartian.

== Personnel ==
- Whitney Houston – vocals, vocal arrangement
- John Robinson – drums
- Paul Jackson, Jr. – guitar
- Nathan East – bass
- Robbie Buchanan – Rhodes piano, acoustic piano, rhythm arrangement
- Lee Holdridge – string arrangement
- Producer – Michael Masser
- Engineers – Michael DeLugg, Dean Burt, Jim Boyer, Mike Mancini, Russ Terrana, Fred Law
- Assistant engineers – Fernando Kral, Tony Maserati
- Mix engineer – Russ Terrana
- Production coordinator – Alicia Winfield

== Charts ==
=== Weekly charts ===
Chart (1987)	Peak position
Australia (Kent Music Report)	27
Belgium (Ultratop 50 Flanders)	16
Canada Top Singles (RPM)	2
Canada Retail Singles (The Record)	4
Canada Adult Contemporary (RPM)	1
Denmark (IFPI)	11
European Hot 100 Singles (Music & Media)	10
Iceland (RÚV)	27
Ireland (IRMA)	4
Luxembourg (Radio Luxembourg)	7
Netherlands (Dutch Top 40)	20
Netherlands (Single Top 100)	17
New Zealand (Recorded Music NZ)	49
Quebec (ADISQ)	1
Spain (AFYVE)	12
Switzerland (Schweizer Hitparade)	18
UK Singles (Official Charts)	14
US Billboard Hot 100	1
US Hot R&B/Hip-Hop Songs (Billboard)	2
US Adult Contemporary (Billboard)	1
US Billboard Crossover Top 30	2
US Cash Box Top 100	1
US Cash Box Top Black Contemporary Singles	4
West Germany (GfK)	20

Chart (2012)	Peak position
Australia (ARIA)	96
South Korea International (Gaon)	124
UK Singles (Official Charts)	92
US Digital Song Sales (Billboard)	58

=== Year-end charts ===
Chart (1987)	Position
Canada Top Singles (RPM)	44
US Top Pop Singles (Billboard)	22
US Top Adult Contemporary Singles (Billboard)	7
US Top Black Singles (Billboard)	38
US Top Hot Crossover Singles (Billboard)	16
US Cash Box Top 100	30
US Cash Box Top Black Contemporary Singles	13

== Certifications ==
Region	Certification	Certified units/sales
United Kingdom (BPI)	Silver	200,000^{‡}
United States (RIAA)	Gold	500,000^{‡}
^{‡} Sales+streaming figures based on certification alone.

== See also ==
- List of Billboard Hot 100 number-one singles of 1987
- List of Hot Adult Contemporary number ones of 1987
- List of Hot 100 number-one singles of the 1980s (U.S.)
- Billboard Year-End Hot 100 singles of 1987
- List of Hot 100 Airplay number-one singles of 1987 (U.S.)
- List of Cash Box Top 100 number-one singles of 1987
