= List of Billboard Hot 100 number ones of 1987 =

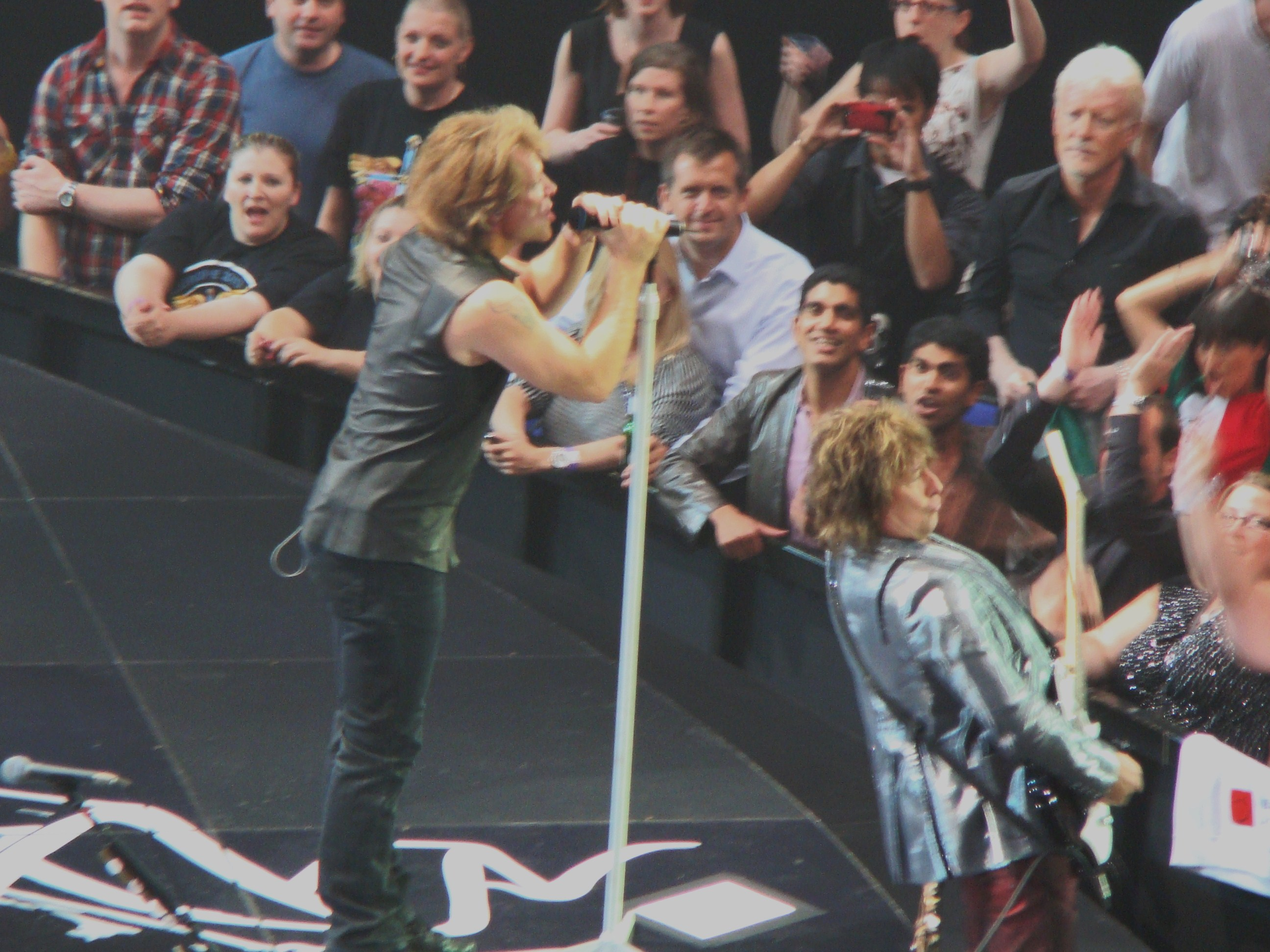
Bon Jovi (pictured) earned their second Hot 100 number-one single with "Livin' on a Prayer", which stayed at the top position for four straight weeks.

These are the Billboard Hot 100 number-one hits of 1987. The longest running number-one singles of 1987 are "Livin' on a Prayer" by Bon Jovi and "Faith" by George Michael which each logged four weeks at number one. "Walk Like an Egyptian" was number one for the last two weeks of 1986 and the first two of 1987, and "Faith" attained three weeks at number one in 1987, plus one additional week due to Billboard's double issue on December 26, giving both songs four weeks at the top.

That year, 16 acts earned their first number one song, such as Gregory Abbott, Billy Vera and the Beaters, Club Nouveau, Cutting Crew, U2, Kim Wilde, Atlantic Starr, Lisa Lisa and Cult Jam, Bob Seger, Los Lobos, Siedah Garrett, Whitesnake, Tiffany, Billy Idol, Bill Medley (his first as a solo artist after recording with The Righteous Brothers), and Belinda Carlisle. Madonna, George Michael, U2, Lisa Lisa and Cult Jam, Whitney Houston, and Michael Jackson were the only acts to hit number one more than once, with each of them hitting twice.

== Chart history ==
Key
†	Indicates best-performing single of 1987

No.	Issue date	Song	Artist(s)	Ref.
617	January 3 (Note: This was an unpublished week, due to a special double issue that Billboard published in print the previous week, for the year-end charts, and covered two weeks; all Billboard weekly charts were "frozen" during the break.)	"Walk Like an Egyptian"†	The Bangles	
617	January 10	"Walk Like an Egyptian"†	The Bangles	
618	January 17	"Shake You Down"	Gregory Abbott	
619	January 24	"At This Moment"	Billy Vera and the Beaters	
619	January 31	"At This Moment"	Billy Vera and the Beaters	
620	February 7	"Open Your Heart"	Madonna	
621	February 14	"Livin' on a Prayer"	Bon Jovi	
621	February 21	"Livin' on a Prayer"	Bon Jovi	
621	February 28	"Livin' on a Prayer"	Bon Jovi	
621	March 7	"Livin' on a Prayer"	Bon Jovi	
622	March 14	"Jacob's Ladder"	Huey Lewis and the News	
623	March 21	"Lean on Me"	Club Nouveau	
623	March 28	"Lean on Me"	Club Nouveau	
624	April 4	"Nothing's Gonna Stop Us Now"	Starship	
624	April 11	"Nothing's Gonna Stop Us Now"	Starship	
625	April 18	"I Knew You Were Waiting (For Me)"	Aretha Franklin and George Michael	
625	April 25	"I Knew You Were Waiting (For Me)"	Aretha Franklin and George Michael	
626	May 2	"(I Just) Died in Your Arms"	Cutting Crew	
626	May 9	"(I Just) Died in Your Arms"	Cutting Crew	
627	May 16	"With or Without You"	U2	
627	May 23	"With or Without You"	U2	
627	May 30	"With or Without You"	U2	
628	June 6	"You Keep Me Hangin' On"	Kim Wilde	
629	June 13	"Always"	Atlantic Starr	
630	June 20	"Head to Toe"	Lisa Lisa and Cult Jam	
631	June 27	"I Wanna Dance with Somebody (Who Loves Me)"	Whitney Houston	
631	July 4	"I Wanna Dance with Somebody (Who Loves Me)"	Whitney Houston	
632	July 11	"Alone"	Heart	
632	July 18	"Alone"	Heart	
632	July 25	"Alone"	Heart	
633	August 1	"Shakedown"	Bob Seger	
634	August 8	"I Still Haven't Found What I'm Looking For"	U2	
634	August 15	"I Still Haven't Found What I'm Looking For"	U2	
635	August 22	"Who's That Girl"	Madonna	
636	August 29	"La Bamba"	Los Lobos	
636	September 5	"La Bamba"	Los Lobos	
636	September 12	"La Bamba"	Los Lobos	
637	September 19	"I Just Can't Stop Loving You"	Michael Jackson with Siedah Garrett	
638	September 26	"Didn't We Almost Have It All"	Whitney Houston	
638	October 3	"Didn't We Almost Have It All"	Whitney Houston	
639	October 10	"Here I Go Again"	Whitesnake	
640	October 17	"Lost in Emotion"	Lisa Lisa and Cult Jam	
641	October 24	"Bad"	Michael Jackson	
641	October 31	"Bad"	Michael Jackson	
642	November 7	"I Think We're Alone Now"	Tiffany	
642	November 14	"I Think We're Alone Now"	Tiffany	
643	November 21	"Mony Mony"	Billy Idol	
644	November 28	"(I've Had) The Time of My Life"	Bill Medley and Jennifer Warnes	
645	December 5	"Heaven Is a Place on Earth"	Belinda Carlisle	
646	December 12	"Faith"	George Michael	
646	December 19	"Faith"	George Michael	
646	December 26	"Faith"	George Michael	

== Number-one artists ==
List of number-one artists by total weeks at number one
Position	Artist	Weeks at No. 1
1	George Michael	5
1	U2	5
3	Bon Jovi	4
3	Whitney Houston	4
5	Heart	3
5	Los Lobos	3
5	Michael Jackson	3
8	The Bangles	2
8	Billy Vera and the Beaters	2
8	Madonna	2
8	Club Nouveau	2
8	Starship	2
8	Aretha Franklin	2
8	Cutting Crew	2
8	Lisa Lisa and Cult Jam	2
8	Tiffany	2
17	Gregory Abbott	1
17	Huey Lewis and the News	1
17	Kim Wilde	1
17	Atlantic Starr	1
17	Bob Seger	1
17	Siedah Garrett	1
17	Whitesnake	1
17	Billy Idol	1
17	Bill Medley	1
17	Jennifer Warnes	1
17	Belinda Carlisle	1

== See also ==
- 1987 in music
- List of Billboard number-one singles
- List of Billboard Hot 100 number-one singles of the 1980s

== Additional sources ==
- Fred Bronson's Billboard Book of Number 1 Hits, 5th Edition (ISBN 0-8230-7677-6)
- Joel Whitburn's Top Pop Singles 1955-2008, 12 Edition (ISBN 0-89820-180-2)
- Joel Whitburn Presents the Billboard Hot 100 Charts: The Eighties (ISBN 0-89820-079-2)
- Additional information obtained can be verified within Billboard's online archive services and print editions of the magazine.
