= Shakedown (Bob Seger song) =

Single by Bob Seger

from the album Beverly Hills Cop II
- B-side: "The Aftermath"
- Released: May 4, 1987
- Genre: Hard rock; dance-rock
- Length: 4:03
- Label: MCA
- Songwriters: Harold Faltermeyer; Keith Forsey; Bob Seger
- Producers: Harold Faltermeyer; Keith Forsey

Bob Seger singles chronology
"Miami" (1986)	"Shakedown" (1987)	"Blue Monday" (1989)

"Shakedown" is a 1987 song recorded by Bob Seger, from the soundtrack of the film Beverly Hills Cop II. The music was written by Harold Faltermeyer, who also wrote the score for the film, and Keith Forsey, with lyrics by Seger. The song became a number-one hit on the Billboard Hot 100, the Cash Box Top 100, Seger's only such top mark singles-wise, as well as the Album Rock Tracks chart, where it became his second number-one hit, spending four weeks at the top. In Canada, it went to number one as well, topping the RPM 100 national singles chart.

In 1988, "Shakedown" was nominated for both the Academy Award for Best Original Song and Golden Globe Award for Best Original Song, but it lost both awards to Dirty Dancing's "(I've Had) The Time of My Life". At the 60th Academy Awards, "Shakedown" was performed by Little Richard.

== History ==
Initially, Seger's friend and fellow Detroiter Glenn Frey was the first choice to record "Shakedown", after having a hit with "The Heat Is On" from Beverly Hills Cop. Frey did not like the lyrics and then came down with laryngitis, so the song was given to Seger. After the song went to number one, Frey called to congratulate Seger, saying "At least we kept the money in Michigan!"

== Personnel ==
Credits are adapted from the liner notes of Seger's 2003 Greatest Hits 2 compilation.

- Harold Faltermeyer – Synclavier
- Keith Forsey – percussion
- Dann Huff – guitar
- Bob Seger – vocals

== Music video ==
The music video featured scenes from the film intercut with Seger and the band performing it.

== Charts ==
=== Weekly charts ===
Chart (1987–1988)	Peak position
Australian Kent Music Report	9
Canada Top Singles (RPM)	1
Italy Airplay (Music & Media)	6
New Zealand (Recorded Music NZ)	33
UK Singles (Official Charts)	88
US Billboard Hot 100	1
US Cash Box Top 100	1
US Mainstream Rock (Billboard)	1
West Germany (GfK)	60

=== Year-end charts ===
Year-end chart (1987)	Position
Australia (Kent Music Report)	68
Canada Top Singles (RPM)	18
US Top Pop Singles (Billboard)	9
US Cash Box Top 100	3

=== All-time charts ===
Chart (1958–2018)	Position
US Billboard Hot 100	590

== See also ==
- List of Hot 100 number-one singles of 1987 (U.S.)
