= Who's That Girl (Madonna song) =

1987 single by Madonna

Single by Madonna

from the album Who's That Girl
- B-side: "White Heat"
- Released: June 23, 1987
- Genre: Dance-pop
- Length: 3:58
- Label: Sire; Warner Bros.
- Songwriters: Madonna; Patrick Leonard
- Producers: Madonna; Patrick Leonard

Madonna singles chronology
"La Isla Bonita" (1987)	"Who's That Girl" (1987)	"Causing a Commotion" (1987)

Music video
- "Who's That Girl" on YouTube

"Who's That Girl" is a song by American singer Madonna from the soundtrack of the 1987 film of the same name. Written and produced by Madonna and Patrick Leonard, it was released as the soundtrack's lead single on July 6, 1987 in Europe, and June 23, 1987 in the United States. An uptempo dance-pop track, it continues Madonna's exploration of Latin pop, following her earlier single "La Isla Bonita". The song features instrumentation including drums, bass, and trumpets, and incorporates lyrics in both English and Spanish. During filming—then under the working title Slammer—Madonna asked Leonard to develop a song reflecting her character, later adding lyrics and renaming both the track and the film to "Who's That Girl".

Upon release, "Who's That Girl" received generally positive-to-mixed reviews from music critics, with comparisons to "La Isla Bonita" drawing both praise and criticism. Commercially, it became Madonna's sixth number-one single on the Billboard Hot 100, making her the artist with the most chart-toppers of the 1980s at the time. Internationally, it also reached number one in several countries, including the United Kingdom, the Netherlands, Italy, Ireland, and Belgium. The song earned nominations for Best Song Written for Visual Media at the 30th Grammy Awards and Best Original Song at the 45th Golden Globe Awards .

The accompanying music video combines footage from the film with scenes of Madonna wandering through a park in a Latin-inspired outfit. The song was performed on her Who's That Girl (1987) and Rebel Heart (2015―2016) concert tours, and has been covered by various artists for tribute albums.

== Background and release ==
In October 1986, Madonna began filming her third feature film, Who's That Girl, a screwball comedy directed by James Foley—whom she had previously worked with on the music videos for "Live to Tell" and "Papa Don't Preach". Originally titled Slammer, the movie stars Madonna as Nikki Finn, a young woman accused of a murder she did not commit; after being released on parole, she sets out to clear her name. Alongside lawyer Loudon Trott (Griffin Dunne), she becomes caught up in "36 hours of high adventure", culminating in a scene where she interrupts a wedding to reveal the real culprit.

Work on the film's soundtrack began in March 1987. Madonna wanted to create songs that would "stand on [their] own as well as support and enhance what was happening on screen". She contacted Patrick Leonard, her collaborator on her third studio album True Blue (1986), and asked him to develop an uptempo title track whose lyrics would capture her character's experience. Leonard composed the refrain and gave it to Madonna as a demo; while he worked on other sections, she completed the melody and wrote the lyrics. However, she struggled to find a word that rhymed with Slammer, which ultimately led her to retitle both the song and the film "Who's That Girl", which she considered a stronger name. Leonard, who agreed with the change, stated that the song was recorded in a single day, noting that Madonna sang it just once, in a single take; guitars and percussion were added the following day. In total, Madonna wrote and performed four original songs for the soundtrack—"Who's That Girl", "Causing a Commotion", "The Look of Love", and "Can't Stop". She later noted that the songs "aren't about Nikki, or written to be sung by someone like her", but that they capture "the spirit" of both the film and the character.

"Who's That Girl" was released as the soundtrack's lead single in Europe on June 29, 1987, and in the United States the following day. It marked Madonna's first single to be issued in cassette format. In 1991, it was included on the four-track extended play (EP) The Holiday Collection, alongside "Holiday" (1983), "True Blue" (1986), and "Causing a Commotion", and later on Madonna's third greatest hits album, Celebration (2009). For the soundtrack's 35th anniversary, Rhino Records released Who's That Girl (Super Club Mix) in April 2022, a five-track extended play featuring remixes of "Who's That Girl" and "Causing a Commotion". Issued as part of Record Store Day, the release was limited to 7,500 copies and pressed on red 12-inch vinyl.

== Composition and remix ==
"Who's That Girl"
Audio sample of "Who's That Girl", a dance-pop song with Latin influences, featuring a bilingual English–Spanish refrain.

"Who's That Girl" was written and produced by Madonna and Leonard. Musically, it has been noted a "lively dance-pop number", incorporating many of Madonna's signature elements, including a drum machine, a "bubbling" synthesized bassline, and distant string textures. It also draws on Latin pop influences—previously explored on Madonna's previous single "La Isla Bonita"—through Spanish phrases in the refrain, trumpet flourishes, an instrumental interlude, and Latin-inspired loops. Writing in Madonna's Drowned Worlds, Santiago Fouz-Hernández described the refrain as a "musical pastiche" blending Cuban percussion with Spanish guitar and maracas, while Keith E. Clifton identified the track as another example of Madonna's engagement with Hispanic musical styles.

According to author Rikky Rooksby, the song is divided into three sections—verse, refrain, and bridge—all of which are "as strong as each other". The bridge, repeated twice, includes the lines "Light up my life/No one can help me now", and is accompanied by modulations and multitracked vocals in passages such as "She's smiling/An invitation to the dance". The track also employs layered vocal lines, a technique previously used by bands such as The Beach Boys and R.E.M., particularly in the final refrain where multiple hooks overlap.

Madonna performs the song in the third person, with lyrics warning that "you should be careful around this extremely hot girl because she'll break your heart", according to Tom Breihan of Stereogum. This can be reflected in lines such as "When you see her, say a prayer and kiss your heart goodbye/She's trouble in a word, get closer to the fire". The "ethereal" refrain alternates between English and Spanish—"¿Quién es esa niña?/Who's that girl?/Señorita, más fina/Who’s that girl?" Patricia Pisters argued that the song reflects recurring themes in Madonna's work, including identity, control, love, sexuality, and spirituality, while presenting femininity as a particularly productive concept.

The remix of "Who's That Girl" was produced by Steve Thompson and Michael Barbiero, and features keyboards by Ed Terry that, according to Brian Chin of Billboard, give the track "an even more Latin hip-hop feel", while still recalling elements of "La Isla Bonita". Author Marc Andrews described this remix as "clunky".

== Critical reception and recognition ==
Critical reviews of "Who's That Girl" ranged from positive to mixed. Daryl Easlea described it as "by far and away, the best song of the soundtrack", adding that it offered a summary of Madonna's work up to that point, while Rooksby called it "delightful" and one of her "best takes on her original music style". Matthew Rettenmund, in Encyclopedia Madonnica, classified it as a "laid-back, effortlessly haunting" song and among the soundtrack's highlights, and J. Randy Taraborrelli described it as "quintessential Madonna [...] funky, sassy and melodic". Additional praise came from Cash Box magazine, which called it "one of her most compelling musical efforts", Jim Zebora of the Record Journal, who wrote that it "hooks you and makes you move", and Stephen Holden of The New York Times, who praised its "buoyant bounce". Others described it as playful, fun, "wistful and appealing", (Note: Attributed to TheBacklot.com, Gay Star News, and the Orlando Sentinel.) while Enio Chiola of PopMatters and Rolling Stone both noted that the song outshines the film.

Several critics highlighted the song's Latin influences and resemblance to "La Isla Bonita". Billboard's Andrew Unterberger noted that both songs share a "contagious" refrain and a "sparkling" production, while Vince Aletti of Rolling Stone wrote that it "bobb[ed] up in the wake of 'La Isla'" but ultimately "grabs hold with its bright bilingual chant". Joe Brown of The Washington Post similarly observed that Madonna was continuing to court the Hispanic market, adding that her delivery made the repetitive lyrics more melodic. Music & Media noted it continues "[Madonna's] Latin leanings that were so successfully used" on its predecessor, while Robert Matthew-Walker highlighted its "light and airy" quality and its blend of English and Puerto Rican Spanish. Ron Fell and Diane Rufer of the Gavin Report described it as a "full summer treat for the entire pop music spectrum".

However, the similarities to "La Isla Bonita" also drew criticism. Tom Breihan called the song mediocre and uninspired, arguing that it rehashed the formula of its predecessor, while Stephen Thomas Erlewine wrote that it lacked the same "freshness", despite a "slightly haunted quality" in its delivery. Jude Rogers (The Guardian) and Chuck Arnold (Entertainment Weekly) likewise considered it inferior, though Arnold still described it as a "tropical delight", and Samuel R. Murrian of Parade wrote that, despite its "charms", it did not hold up as well as other singles from the era. Erlewine further stated that it was not among Madonna's strongest work, a view echoed by the Reading Eagle's Al Walentis, who called it "so nondescript that [it goes] in one ear and out the other". Criticism was also directed at Madonna's vocals, which Brown described as overly processed, while Breihan said she did not sound fully comfortable singing in Spanish. Rolling Stone readers ranked it as the fifth best song from a film, but also as the fifth worst single of 1987.

In retrospective rankings, some critics have described "Who's That Girl" as one of Madonna's more lightweight and least-remembered number-one hits. It ranked tenth in a 2000 fan poll of her twelve US number-one singles, and nineteenth in a similar 2003 Q magazine readers' poll of her top twenty singles. Despite its mixed reception, the song received nominations for Best Original Song at the 45th Golden Globe Awards and Best Song Written for Visual Media at the 30th Annual Grammy Awards, and was recognized at the 1988 American Society of Composers, Authors and Publishers (ASCAP) Pop Awards as one of the most played songs on American radio. Both Rettenmund and Billboard's Paul Grein opined that it was overlooked by the Academy Awards. Critical reassessment has been more positive, with "Who's That Girl" frequently listed among Madonna's best songs, (Note: Attributed to multiple sources, including The A.V. Club, The Arizona Republic, Billboard, TheBacklot.com, Classic Pop, The Daily Telegraph, The Detroit News, Entertainment Weekly, Gay Star News, Parade, PinkNews, PopMatters, Rolling Stone, Slant Magazine, and USA Today.) and cited as one of the best songs of 1987. (Note: Attributed to Melody Maker, The Face, and Yahoo!) It was included in Bruce Pollock's Rock Song Index: The 7500 Most Important Songs for the Rock & Roll Era.

== Chart performance ==
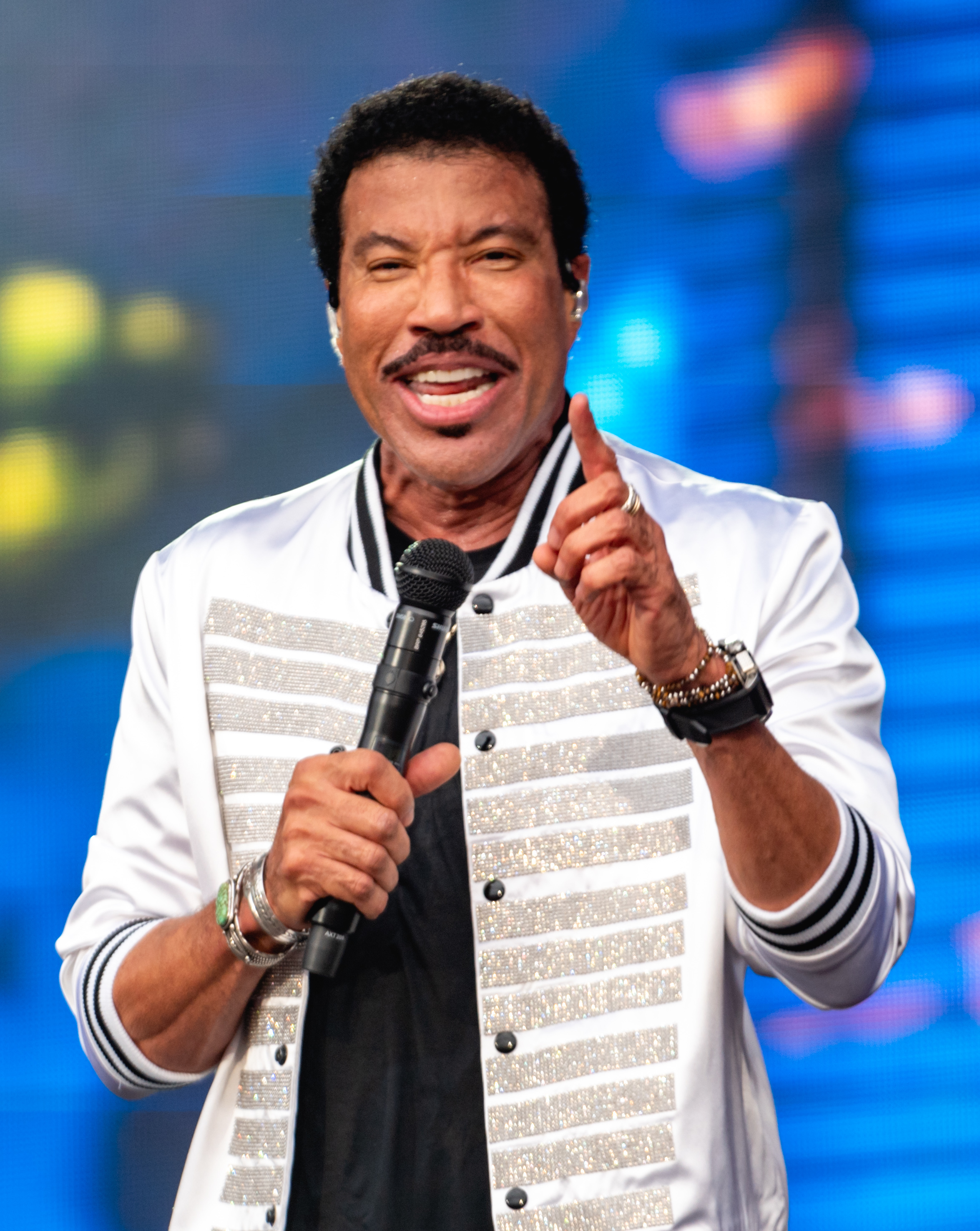
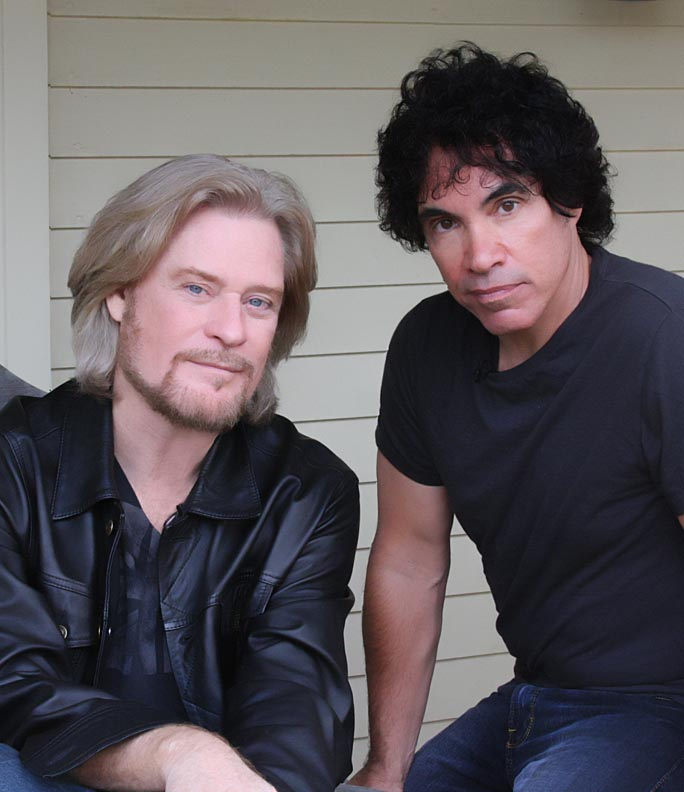
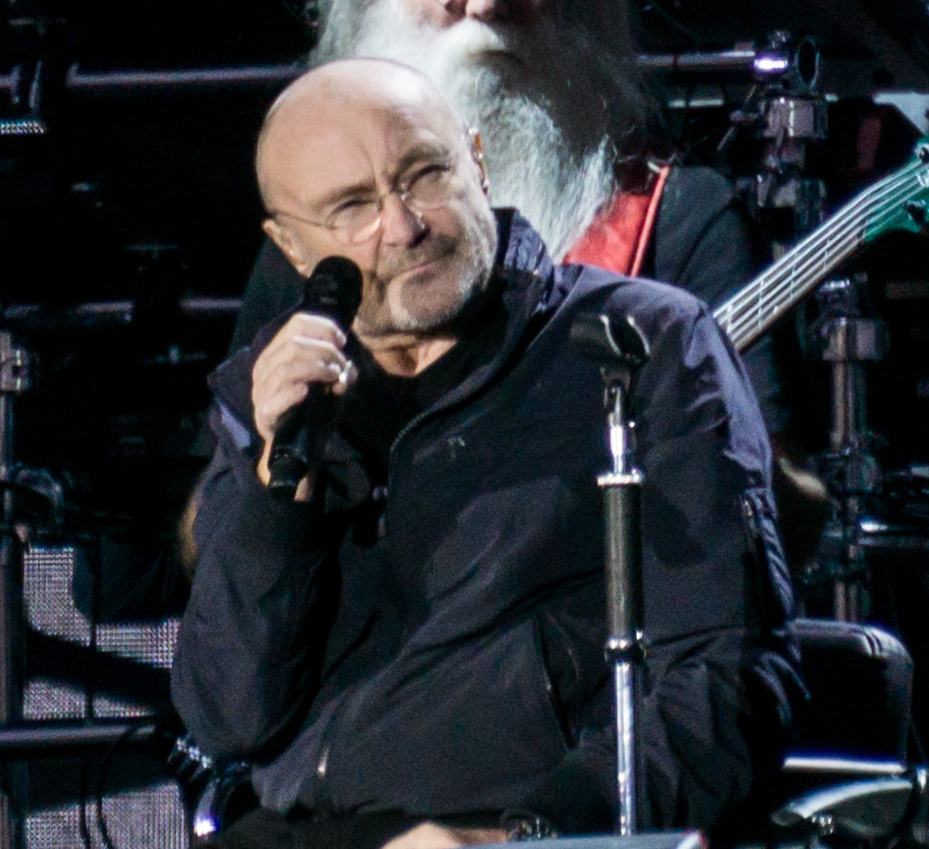
With "Who's That Girl", Madonna became the artist with the most number-one singles on the Billboard Hot 100 during the 1980s, surpassing Lionel Richie (left), Hall & Oates (center), and Phil Collins (right)

In the United States, "Who's That Girl" received airplay on 193 of 227 radio stations nationwide, debuting at number 43 on the Billboard Hot 100 on July 11, 1987, and becoming Madonna’s twelfth consecutive single to achieve the week's highest debut—a streak that began with "Lucky Star" in 1984. Almost one month later, it reached number seven, tying her with Lionel Richie for thirteen consecutive top-ten hits. The song then climbed to number one on August 22—her sixth on the chart—replacing U2's "I Still Haven't Found What I'm Looking For". With this, Madonna surpassed Hall & Oates, Richie, and Phil Collins for the most number-one singles of the decade at the time, and became one of only two female artists—alongside Diana Ross—to achieve six number ones, and the only one to do so as a solo act. It also marked her third number one from a film, following "Crazy for You" (from Vision Quest) and "Live to Tell" (from At Close Range). The single spent sixteen weeks on the chart and ranked 42 on the Billboard year-end Hot 100 for 1987.

The single topped Billboard's Hot 100 Airplay and Hot 100 Singles charts, while reaching number two on the Hot Dance/Maxi-Singles Sales chart, and number five on the Adult Contemporary chart. In October 1987, a Warner Bros. executive confirmed it as the label's best-selling cassette single, with sales surpassing 100,000 copies by mid-1988. In retrospective rankings, Billboard placed it at number 90 on Warner Bros.' most successful songs list in 2008, number 11 among Sire Records singles on the Hot 100 in 2012, and, as of August 2024, Madonna's 14th most successful Hot 100 entry. In Canada, "Who's That Girl" debuted at number 83 on the RPM Top 100 Singles chart on July 11, 1987, and within a month had sold 40,000 copies across cassette and 7-inch vinyl formats. It reached number one on August 29, becoming the singer's seventh Canadian number-one hit. The track spent a total of twenty-three weeks on the chart and finished as the twelfth biggest single of 1987. It was also one of eight singles to be certified gold by the Canadian Recording Industry Association (CRIA) that year. The single also reached the top five in Mexico.

"Who's That Girl" achieved strong commercial success across Europe and other international markets. It debuted at number three on the European Airplay Top 50, the highest entry in the chart's history at the time—surpassing the previous record set by Bronski Beat's "Why?" (1984)—and later reached number one for two consecutive weeks, becoming Madonna's seventh chart-topper on the survey. On the European Hot 100 Singles, it peaked at number two—behind Michael Jackson's "I Just Can't Stop Loving You"—and ranked among the ten best-selling singles of 1987. The song reached number one in several countries, including Belgium, Ireland and the Netherlands. In the United Kingdom, it debuted at number three on the UK Singles Chart before rising to number one the following week—her fifth chart-topper there—and remained on the chart for ten weeks; it was certified silver by the British Phonographic Industry (BPI) and had sold over 376,000 copies as of 2008. It also topped the Italian chart for eleven consecutive weeks and was the country’s best-selling single of the year, while in France it was certified gold for sales exceeding 500,000 units. In other markets, it reached the top ten in Australia and New Zealand, while achieving moderate success in Japan and South Africa.

== Music video ==
=== Background and synopsis ===
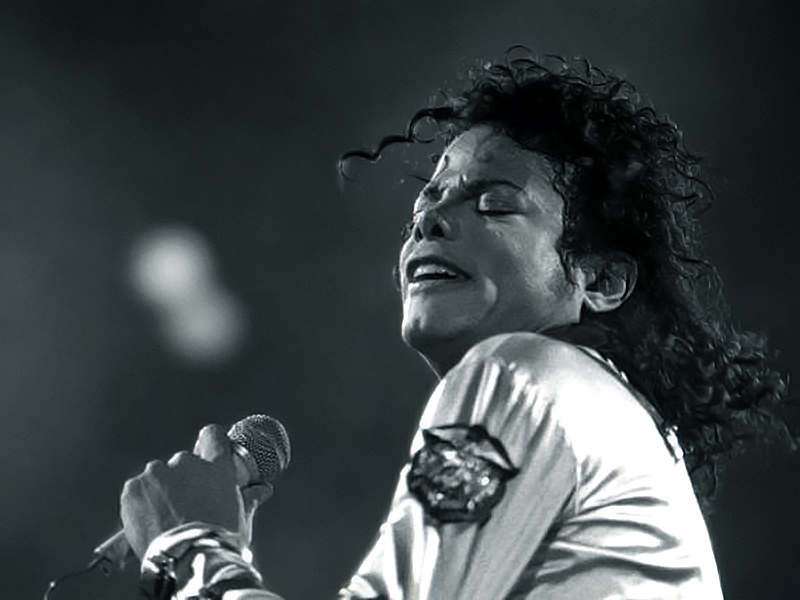
Madonna's look in the "Who's That Girl" music video (left) was compared to that of singer Michael Jackson (right)

The music video for "Who's That Girl" was filmed over two days at the A&M Soundstage in Hollywood, California, directed by Peter Rosenthal and produced by James Foley and Joel Stillman for Broadcast Arts Inc. It intercuts footage from Who's That Girl with newly shot live-action scenes of Madonna in an androgynous, "hip Latina" persona—wearing an oversized jacket, black bustier, short pants and a pork pie hat, with spiky brown hair. In contrast to her platinum blonde, screwball-inspired look in the film, her appearance in the video was described as a blend of Michael Jackson and the Pied Piper.

The video begins with Madonna entering a park, where she attracts the attention of a man and a group of children. It then alternates between scenes of Madonna singing and wandering through the park and excerpts from the film. The children and the man later lead her to a darkened room, where she encounters a fortune teller, who shows her the High Priestess tarot card featuring a caricature of her character Nikki Finn. When Madonna looks up, the woman has disappeared; she then discovers a key that opens a chest containing a glowing white crystal, which projects scenes from the film, including its animated opening credits. The man and the children reappear near the end, dancing with Madonna "adoringly".

=== Release and reception ===
"Who's That Girl" premiered on MTV in early July 1987 and, for nine weeks, received heavy rotation on the channel, while also becoming one of the most frequently aired videos on European television that year. In 2009, it was included on Madonna's compilation Celebration: The Video Collection. Contemporary reviews were negative. Vincent Canby of The New York Times argued that, although intended to promote the film, the video instead highlighted its least appealing aspects and failed to capture Madonna's charisma. He further criticized the persona she adopted, stating that it "appeals neither to people who've never seen her before nor to anyone who's admired the sometimes brazenly erotic and funny performer [she] is in her best music videos". Tamara Ikenberg of the Los Angeles Times dismissed it as a "fiasco".

Retrospective commentary has been more favorable: Rettenmund described the video as "cute", "creative" and "movie-plugging", but noted that it was rarely broadcast in later years. In High Concept: Movies and Marketing in Hollywood (1994), Justin Wyatt observed that the video presents "Madonna, the singer, gazing longingly at Madonna, the comedienne/actress". Andy Jones from Classic Pop magazine considered it the strongest of the soundtrack's music videos, and praised it for incorporating brand-new footage and a loose narrative rather than relying solely on movie scenes. Genna Rivieccio of website Culled Culture described it as "strange and ethereal", adding that, while Madonna attempted to create original elements, the video ultimately reflects its purpose as a quickly assembled promotional tie-in. Elements of the video—particularly the use of onlookers and the glowing crystal—were later echoed in "Levitating (The Blessed Madonna remix)" (2020) by Dua Lipa.

== Live performances and covers ==
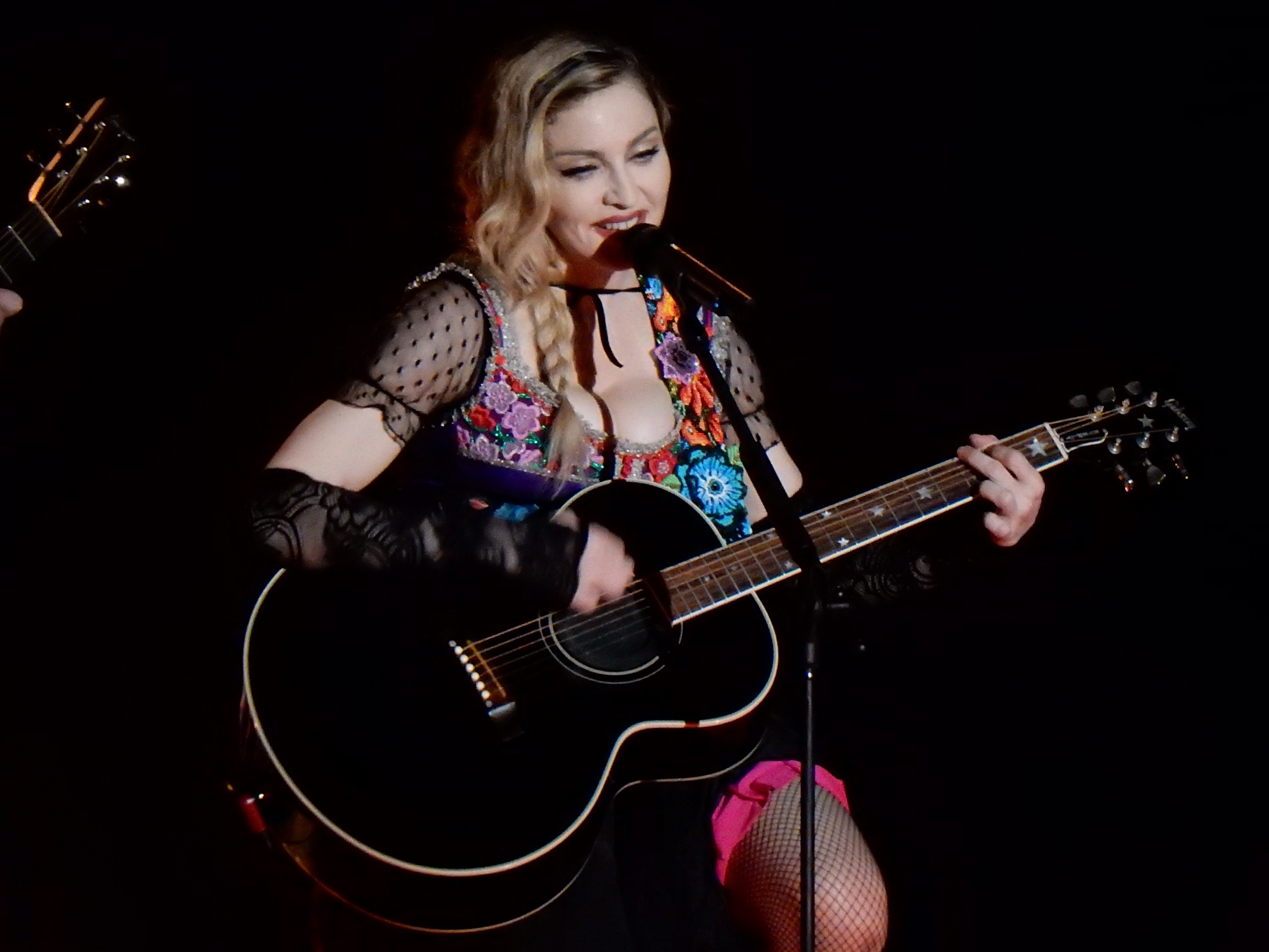
Madonna singing an acoustic "Who's That Girl" on the Rebel Heart Tour (2015―2016)

Madonna has performed the song on two of her concert tours: Who's That Girl (1987) and Rebel Heart (2015―2016). On the first one, she sang it as the penultimate number, wearing a red flamenco dress. At the end of the performance, she stepped out to the front of the darkened stage and sang the phrase "Who's that girl" repeatedly in a "sad chant that became increasingly self-absorbed and haunting", as noted by Vince Aletti. Author Michelle Morgan considered the number among the concert's most energetic, whereas Richard Harrington of The Washington Post deemed it one of the weakest. A performance from this tour was included on the video release Ciao Italia: Live from Italy (1988).

An acoustic, flamenco-tinged rendition of "Who's That Girl" was performed on the Rebel Heart Tour. Madonna, wearing a Day of the Dead-inspired dress designed by Alessandro Michele for Gucci, played guitar and incorporated audience participation during the refrain. After finishing the song, she told the audience she still did not have an answer, adding: "I don't know [...] maybe that's what life's about, figuring out who the fuck you are". Rob Sheffield of Rolling Stone described "Who's That Girl" as the concert's "emotional highlight".

In 1998, the Royal Philharmonic Orchestra recorded an instrumental version of "Who's That Girl" for Material Girl: RPO Plays Music of Madonna. A year later a rendition by The Countdown Singers was included on Hit Parade of 80's, Vol. 2. American band The Bubonic Plague recorded a synth-pop rendition for the tribute album Through the Wilderness (2007), which Pitchfork's Stephen M. Deusner criticized as uninspired and "beyond [the band's] ability to salvage". In 2021, Dutch DJs Joe Stone and Jack Wins sampled the song on "Light Up My Life", with Madonna approving the use.

== Formats and track listings ==
US and European 7-inch single

1. "Who's That Girl" – 3:58
2. "White Heat" – 4:40

UK 12-inch single; limited edition 12-inch picture disc

1. "Who's That Girl" (Extended version) – 6:29
2. "White Heat" – 4:40

US cassette and maxi single; UK limited edition 12-inch single

1. A1 "Who's That Girl" (Extended version) – 6:29
2. A2 "Who's That Girl" (Dub version) – 5:07
3. A3 "White Heat" – 4:40

1991 The Holiday Collection EP

1. "Holiday" – 6:09
2. "True Blue" – 4:17
3. "Who's That Girl" – 3:58
4. "Causing a Commotion (Note: Listed as "Causin' a Commotion"; the version included is the "Silver Screen Mix".)" – 4:06

2022 Record Store Day exclusive red 12-inch vinyl

1. A1 "Who's That Girl" (Extended version) – 6:29
2. A2 "Causing a Commotion" (Movie House Mix) – 9:40
3. B1 "Causing a Commotion" (Silver Screen Mix) – 6:33
4. B2 "Who's That Girl" (Dub version) – 5:05
5. B3 "Causing a Commotion" (Dub) – 7:04

2024 Digital single

1. "Who's That Girl" – 3:58
2. "Who's That Girl" (Extended version) – 6:28
3. "Who's That Girl" (Dub version) – 5:04

== Credits and personnel ==
Credits adapted from the Who's That Girl soundtrack liner notes.

- Madonna – lyrics, producer, vocals
- Patrick Leonard – lyrics, producer
- Michael Barbiero and Steve Thompson – additional production, audio mixing

== Charts ==
=== Weekly charts ===
1987 weekly chart performance for "Who's That Girl"
Chart (1987)	Peak position
Australia (Kent Music Report)	7
Austria (Ö3 Austria Top 40)	4
Belgium (Ultratop 50 Flanders)	1
Canada Top Singles (RPM)	1
Denmark (IFPI)	1
European Hot 100 Singles (Music & Media)	2
European Airplay Top 50 (Music & Media)	1
Finland (Suomen virallinen lista)	2
France (SNEP)	2
Greece (IFPI)	2
Iceland (RÚV)	6
Ireland (IRMA)	1
Italy (Musica e dischi)	1
Japan (Oricon Singles Chart)	39
Netherlands (Dutch Top 40)	1
Netherlands (Single Top 100)	2
New Zealand (Recorded Music NZ)	2
Norway (VG-lista)	2
Portugal (IFPI)	1
South Africa (Springbok Radio)	6
Spain (AFYVE)	4
Sweden (Sverigetopplistan)	2
Switzerland (Schweizer Hitparade)	2
UK Singles (Official Charts)	1
US Billboard Hot 100	1
US Adult Contemporary (Billboard)	5
US Dance Club Songs (Billboard)	44
US Dance Singles Sales (Billboard)	2
US Hot R&B/Hip-Hop Songs (Billboard)	78
West Germany (GfK)	2

2022 weekly chart performance for "Who's That Girl"
Chart (2022)	Peak position
Hungary (MAHASZ) "Who's That Girl" / "Causing a Commotion"	3
UK Physical Singles (OCC)	2
UK Vinyl Singles	2

2024 weekly chart performance for "Who's That Girl"
Chart (2024)	Peak position
UK Singles Downloads	99

=== Year-end charts ===
1987 year-end chart performance for "Who's That Girl"
Chart (1987)	Position
Australia (Kent Music Report)	66
Belgium (Ultratop 50 Flanders)	10
Canada Top Singles (RPM)	12
Denmark (IFPI)	4
European Hot 100 Singles (Music & Media)	7
France (SNEP)	15
Italy (Musica e dischi)	1
Netherlands (Dutch Top 40)	5
Netherlands (Single Top 100)	9
New Zealand (Recorded Music NZ)	14
Norway (VG-lista)	5
Switzerland (Schweizer Hitparade)	10
UK Singles (OCC)	20
US Billboard Hot 100	42
US Cash Box Top 100 Singles	14
West Germany (GfK)	22

2022 year-end chart performance for "Who's That Girl"
Chart (2022)	Position
UK Vinyl Singles (OCC)	22

=== Decade-end charts ===
Decade-end chart performance for "Who's That Girl"
Chart (1980-1989)	Position
Netherlands (Dutch Top 40)	61

== Certifications and sales ==
Certifications and sales for "Who's That Girl"
Region	Certification	Certified units/sales
Canada (Music Canada)	Gold	40,000
France (SNEP)	Gold	500,000^{*}
Japan (Oricon Charts)	—	35,650
United Kingdom (BPI)	Silver	376,498
United States Vinyl and cassette single	—	446,000 + 105,000
^{*} Sales figures based on certification alone.

== See also ==
- List of number-one hits (Belgium)
- List of Billboard Hot 100 number-one singles of 1987
- List of number-one singles of 1987 (Canada)
- List of Dutch Top 40 number-one singles of 1987
- List of number-one singles of 1987 (Ireland)
- List of number-one hits of 1987 (Italy)
- List of UK Singles Chart number ones of the 1980s

== Literary sources ==
- Andrews, Marc (2022). Madonna: Song by Song. Fonthill Media. ISBN 978-1-78155-844-7.
- Bronson, Fred (2003). The Billboard Book of Number 1 Hits. Billboard Books. ISBN 978-0-8230-7677-2.
- Easlea, Daryl (2012). Madonna: Blond Ambition. Backbeat Books. ISBN 978-1-61713-034-2.
- Fouz-Hernández, Santiago; Jarman-Ivens, Freya (2004). Madonna's Drowned Worlds. Ashgate Publishing, Ltd. ISBN 978-0-7546-3371-6.
- Kellner, Douglas (1995). Media Culture: Cultural Studies, Identity, and Politics Between the Modern and the Postmodern. Routledge. ISBN 978-0-415-10569-9.
- Matthew-Walker, Robert (1991). Madonna: The Biography. Sidgwick & Jackson. ISBN 978-0-330-31482-4.
- Morton, Andrew (2001). Madonna. St. Martin's Press. ISBN 978-1-854-79888-6.
- Morgan, Michelle (2015). Madonna. Constable & Robinson. ISBN 978-0-7624-5621-5.
- Pollock, Bruce (2005). Rock Song Index: The 7500 Most Important Songs for the Rock & Roll Era. Routledge. ISBN 978-0-415-97073-0.
- Rettenmund, Matthew (1995). Encyclopedia Madonnica. St. Martin's Press. ISBN 978-0-312-11782-5.
- Rooksby, Rikky (2004). The Complete Guide to the Music of Madonna. Omnibus Press. ISBN 978-0-7119-9883-4.
- Sexton, Adam (1993). Desperately Seeking Madonna: In Search of the Meaning of the World's Most Famous Woman. Random Penguin. ISBN 978-0-307-48374-4.
- Taraborrelli, Randy J. (2001). Madonna: An Intimate Biography. Simon & Schuster. ISBN 978-0-283-07289-5.
- Madonna: The Rolling Stone Files. Hyperion Press. 1997. ISBN 978-0-7868-8154-3.
- Wyatt, Justin (1994). High Concept: Movies and Marketing in Hollywood. University of Texas Press. ISBN 978-0-292-79091-9.
