= At This Moment =

- 1986 Dutch single

Single by Billy Vera and the Beaters

from the album Billy and the Beaters
- B-side: "I Can Take Care of Myself" (US) "Corner of the Night" (Intl.)
- Released: 1981 (re-release 1986)
- Recorded: January 17, 1981
- Venue: Roxy Theatre, West Hollywood, California
- Genre: Blue-eyed soul
- Length: 4:21 (Album version); 3:31 (Single version)
- Label: Alfa (1981 original release 3:31); Rhino (1986 reissue 4:21)
- Songwriter: Billy Vera
- Producer: Jeff Baxter

Billy Vera and the Beaters singles chronology
"I Can Take Care of Myself" (1981)	"At This Moment" (1981)

Alternative release
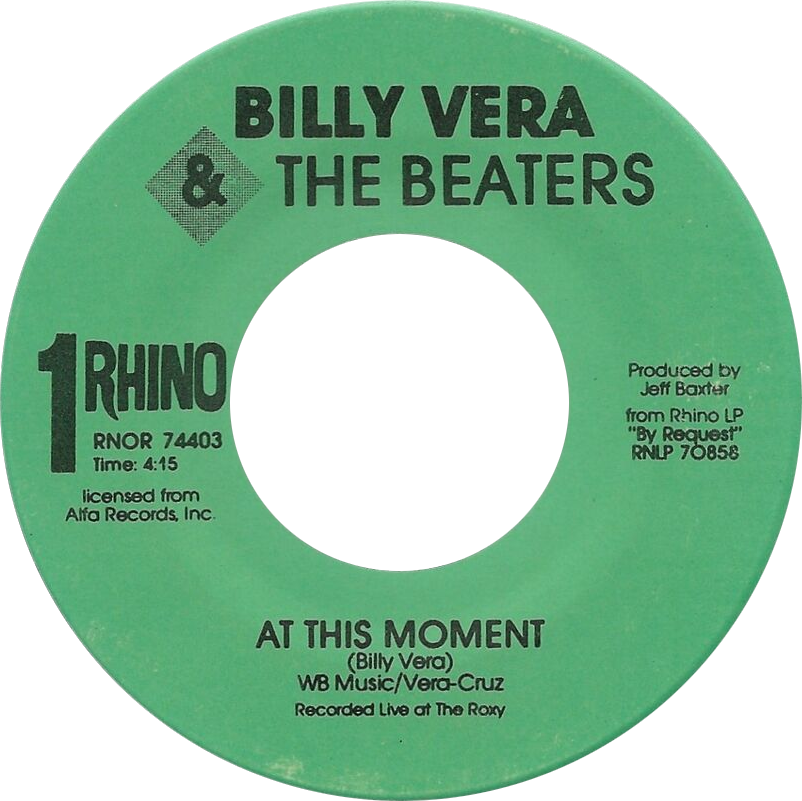
- Side A of 1986 US re-release

"At This Moment" is a song written by Billy Vera and recorded live by Vera and his band under the name Billy Vera & the Beaters in 1981, during a string of performances at the Roxy in West Hollywood (January 15–17) and featured on their self-titled live album Billy and the Beaters, released that year as the album's second single, on the American subsidiary of Japan's Alfa Records. The song is more notable for its second run on the charts years after its initial release, when it was featured on television's Family Ties series, after which the song became a number 1 hit in early 1987.

== Original release ==
When it was originally released as a single (Alfa 7005), as the follow-up to the album's first single, "I Can Take Care of Myself" (which had become the band's first Billboard Top 40 hit), "At this Moment" stalled on the Billboard Hot 100 chart at number 79 at the end of 1981.

== Re-release ==
Five years after the original release, a studio version of "At This Moment" was included on several episodes of the NBC sitcom Family Ties during the 1985–86 season as the love song associated with Alex P. Keaton (played by Michael J. Fox) and his girlfriend Ellen Reed (played by Tracy Pollan, whom Fox eventually married in real life). Its exposure on Family Ties renewed interest in the song. Reissue label Rhino Records purchased the track from the band's original record label, Alfa (the American subsidiary of which was by then inactive), and re-released it in its original version as Rhino 74403. The tune then began a revived chart run, eventually hitting number 1 on both the Billboard Hot 100 and Adult Contemporary charts in January 1987.

The song also bears a rare distinction of becoming a crossover hit on both the Billboard R&B Chart and the Billboard Hot Country Chart, reaching number 70 and number 42 on these charts, respectively. As the song was starting to take off, it came to the attention of Ron Carpentier, President of RCI Music Promotion, who was hired for promotion of the song to radio, and soon after, the song hit the Billboard Hot Country Chart. It quickly sold over a million copies in the United States, becoming one of the last Gold-certified singles in the 45 rpm format. "At This Moment" would be the last song for 13 years to appear on the country charts and reach number one on the pop charts.

In an interview with Rachael Ray in 2007, Michael J. Fox good-naturedly stated, "Tracy and I couldn't get on the dance floor anywhere in the world in the first ten years of our marriage without them playing 'What did you think...' "

At the 2011 TV Land Awards held in New York City, Billy Vera performed "At This Moment" with the Family Ties cast in attendance, including Fox and Pollan.

== Notable cover versions ==
The song has been covered by many artists. Among the most prominent versions are those by Tom Jones, Wayne Newton and Michael Bublé, the latter releasing the song in 2009 on his multi-Platinum album, Crazy Love. Seth MacFarlane has performed the song twice on screen: he sang the song's opening lines in the character of Brian Griffin in the Family Guy episode "Brian the Bachelor", and as the title character in the 2015 film Ted 2. Jimmy Fallon and the Roots performed the song in 2018 on The Tonight Show Starring Jimmy Fallon, as part of the show's Cover Room series.

== Charts ==
=== Weekly charts ===
Chart (1981)	Peak position
US Billboard Hot 100	79

Chart (1986–1987)	Peak position
Australia (Kent Music Report)	11
Canada Top Tracks (RPM)	1
Canada Adult Contemporary (RPM)	1
Ireland (IRMA)	18
Netherlands (Single Top 100)	26
New Zealand (Recorded Music NZ)	50
UK Singles (OCC)	97
US Billboard Hot 100 Singles	1
US Adult Contemporary (Billboard)	1
US Hot Country Singles (Billboard)	42
US R&B Singles (Billboard)	70

=== Year-end charts ===
Chart (1987)	Rank
Australia (Kent Music Report)	60
Canada (RPM)	9
US Billboard Hot 100	20
US Adult Contemporary (Billboard)	30

== Certifications ==
Certifications for At This Moment
Region	Certification	Certified units/sales
Canada (Music Canada)	Gold	50,000^{^}
^{^} Shipments figures based on certification alone.
