= Exposé discography =

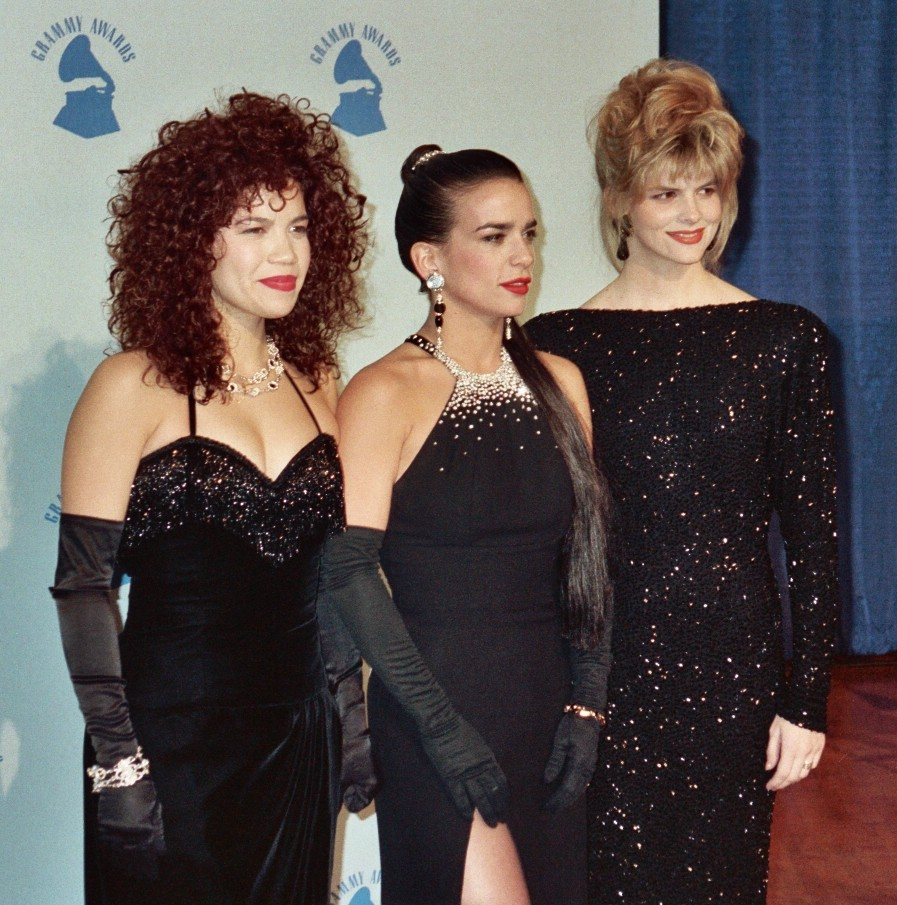
- Exposé at the 1990 Grammy Awards
- Studio albums: 3
- Compilation albums: 5
- Singles: 17
- Video albums: 1
- Music videos: 11

This article presents the discography of all albums and singles released by American girl group Exposé. It includes three studio albums, five compilation albums, one video album, 11 music videos, and 17 singles including the group's number one single on the Billboard Hot 100, "Seasons Change".

== Albums ==
=== Studio albums ===
Year	Album details	Peak chart positions			Certifications (sales threshold)
Year	Album details	US	US R&B	CAN	Certifications (sales threshold)
1987	Exposure: Release date: March 2, 1987; Label: Arista	16	20	61	US: 2× Platinum; CAN: Gold
1989	What You Don't Know: Release date: June 13, 1989; Label: Arista	33	94	66	US: Gold
1992	Exposé: Release date: October 9, 1992; Label: Arista	135	93	—	US: Gold
"—" denotes releases that did not chart

=== Compilation albums ===
Year	Album details
1993	The Encore Collection: Seasons Change: Release date: November 22, 1993; Label: BMG Special Products
1995	Greatest Hits: Release date: November 21, 1995; Label: Arista
1999	Master Hits: Release date: July 27, 1999; Label: Arista
2002	Exposé's Greatest Dance Mixes: Release date: February 2, 2002; Label: Thump Records
2006	Dance Mixes: Release date: January 31, 2006; Label: BMG Special Products
2013	Playlist: The Very Best of Exposé: Release date: 2013; Label: Arista/Legacy

== Singles ==
Year	Single	Peak chart positions									Certifications (sales threshold)	Album
Year	Single	US	US Dance	US Dance Sales	US R&B	US AC	CA	UK	NL	AUS	Certifications (sales threshold)	Album
1985	"Point of No Return"	—	1	19	—	—	—	—	—	—		Exposure
1985	"Exposed to Love"	—	12	19	—	—	—	—	—	—		Exposure
1987	"Come Go with Me"	5	1	2	14	—	19	—	—	—		Exposure
1987	"Point of No Return" (re-recording)	5	1	40	39	—	22	83	—	—		Exposure
1987	"Let Me Be the One"	7	2	13	29	—	47	76	—	—		Exposure
1987	"Seasons Change"	1	—	32	27	1	11	97	—	—		Exposure
1989	"What You Don't Know"	8	2	8	—	—	17	99	55	69	US: Gold	What You Don't Know
1989	"When I Looked at Him"	10	—	—	—	3	18	—	5	168		What You Don't Know
1989	"Tell Me Why"	9	3	26	—	—	34	97	78	157		What You Don't Know
1990	"Your Baby Never Looked Good in Blue"	17	—	—	—	9	17	—	—	—		What You Don't Know
1990	"Stop, Listen, Look & Think"	—	19	—	—	—	—	—	—	—		What You Don't Know
1992	"I Wish the Phone Would Ring"	28	—	14	—	—	49	—	193	—		Exposé
1993	"I'll Never Get Over You Getting Over Me"	8	—	—	—	1	16	75	—	—	US: Gold	Exposé
1993	"As Long as I Can Dream"	55	—	—	—	21	41	—	—	—		Exposé
1994	"In Walked Love"	84	—	—	—	17	49	—	—	—		Exposé
1995	"I'll Say Good-Bye for the Two of Us"	— (Note: "I'll Say Good-Bye for the Two of Us" did not enter the Billboard Hot 100, but peaked at number 17 on the Bubbling Under Hot 100 Singles chart.)	—	—	—	—	—	—	—	—		Free Willy 2: The Adventure Home Original Motion Picture Soundtrack
1995	"I Specialize in Love"	—	6	20	—	—	—	—	—	—		Greatest Hits
2012	"Shine On"	—	—	—	—	—	—	—	—	—		non-album single
"—" denotes releases that did not chart

== Videography ==
=== Video albums ===
Year	Album details	Certifications (sales threshold)
1990	Video Exposure: Release date: 1990; Label: Arista/Pioneer Records	US: Gold

=== Music videos ===
Year	Song	Director
1987	"Come Go With Me"	Peter Lippman
1987	"Point of No Return"	Peter Lippman
1987	"Let Me Be the One"	Ralph Ziman
1987	"Seasons Change"	Peter Israelson
1989	"What You Don't Know"	Greg Gold
1989	"When I Looked at Him"	Marcello Anciano
1990	"Tell Me Why"	David Kellogg
1990	"Your Baby Never Looked Good in Blue"	S. A. Baron
1992	"I Wish the Phone Would Ring"	Millicent Shelton
1993	"I'll Never Get Over You (Gettin' Over Me)"	Jim Yukich
1993	"As Long As I Can Dream"	Jim Shea
