= Greatest Hits (Exposé album) =

Greatest hits album by Exposé
- Released: November 21, 1995
- Recorded: 1995
- Length: 64:52
- Label: Arista
- Producers: Lewis A. Martinee, Keith Thomas, Guy Roche

Exposé chronology
Exposé (1992)	Greatest Hits (1995)	Master Hits (1999)

Singles from Greatest Hits
- 1. "I'll Say Good-Bye for the Two of Us" Released: November 17, 1995

Professional ratings
Review scores
Source	Rating
AllMusic	4.5/5 stars

Greatest Hits is a greatest hits compilation album by Exposé, released on November 21, 1995. It contains all of their Top 40 pop hits (with the exception of "I Wish the Phone Would Ring"), two new songs ("I'll Say Good-Bye for the Two of Us" [from the film Free Willy 2: The Adventure Home] and a remake of Skeeter Davis's hit "End of the World"). In addition, the album includes remixes of three of their hits.

== Track listing ==
All tracks are written by Lewis A. Martineé; except where indicated.

No.	Title	Writer(s)	Lead vocals	Length
1.	"Come Go With Me"		Jeanette Jurado	4:17
2.	"Point of No Return" (Re-recorded Version)		Jeanette Jurado	3:28
3.	"Let Me Be the One" (Single Version)		Gioia Bruno	4:08
4.	"I'll Say Goodbye for the Two of Us"	Diane Warren	Jeanette Jurado	4:35
5.	"What You Don't Know" (Single Version)		Gioia Bruno	4:11
6.	"Tell Me Why" (Single Mix)		Gioia Bruno	4:25
7.	"Seasons Change"		Jeanette Jurado	4:16
8.	"I'll Never Get Over You Getting Over Me"	Diane Warren	Jeanette Jurado	3:49
9.	"Exposed to Love"		Alé Lorenzo	3:34
10.	"I Specialize in Love" (Remix)	Lotti Golden, Richard Scher	Ann Curless, Jeanette Jurado, Kelly Moneymaker	3:56
11.	"End of the World"	Sylvia Dee, Arthur Kent	Jeanette Jurado	3:29
12.	"When I Looked at Him" (Single Version)		Jeanette Jurado	4:17
13.	"Your Baby Never Looked Good in Blue"	Diane Warren	Jeanette Jurado	3:59
14.	"Come Go With Me" (Remix)		Jeanette Jurado	7:24
15.	"Point of No Return" (Remix)		Jeanette Jurado	5:04

== Charts ==
Singles - Billboard (North America)

Year	Single	Chart	Position
1995	"I'll Say Good-Bye for the Two of Us"	The Billboard Hot 100	117
1995	"I Specialize in Love"	Hot Dance Music/Club Play	6
1995	"I Specialize in Love"	Hot Dance Music/Maxi-Singles Sales	20
