= I'll Never Get Over You Getting Over Me =

"I'll Never Get Over You (Getting Over Me)"

Single by Exposé

from the album Exposé
- B-side: "Give Me All Your Love"
- Released: March 1993
- Recorded: 1992
- Genre: Pop
- Length: 3:49
- Label: Arista
- Songwriter: Diane Warren
- Producer: Guy Roche

Exposé singles chronology
"I Wish the Phone Would Ring" (1992)	"I'll Never Get Over You (Getting Over Me)" (1993)	"As Long as I Can Dream" (1993)

"I'll Never Get Over You Getting Over Me" is a song written by Diane Warren and recorded by American female contemporary R&B group Exposé. It is featured on Exposé's 1992 eponymous album. It was the second single taken from the group's third studio album and was released in early 1993. The lead vocalist was Jeanette Jurado. Although the printing on the original album refers to the song as "I'll Never Get Over You Getting Over Me", many sources (including the cassette and CD singles that were released) place the last three words of the title in parentheses.

Saxophonist Euge Groove (who was then known as Steven Grove) provided the song's instrumental solo. This marks the second time he is featured on an Exposé hit, as he was also the saxophone soloist for their No. 1 pop song, "Seasons Change".

== Background ==
According to Jurado, composer Diane Warren had submitted "I'll Never Get Over You Getting Over Me" for consideration for Exposé to record at the same time as another Warren composition "Your Baby Never Looked Good in Blue" which appeared on the second Exposé album What You Don't Know (1989): Arista Records president Clive Davis had indicated that only one of the two songs could be recorded for the second Exposé album and although Jurado favored "I'll Never Get Over You Getting Over Me" the album's producer Lewis Martineé opted for "Your Baby Never Looked Good in Blue". Jurado - "I felt like we lost 'I'll Never Get Over You Getting Over Me'...and then come the third [album] that [song] was one of the songs Clive still held [exclusively] and I am so grateful to Diane for [allowing] that."

== Reception ==
The song peaked at No. 6 on the US Cash Box Top 100 and No. 8 on the US Billboard Hot 100 chart in mid-1993. It also spent a week atop the Adult Contemporary chart in July of that year. It was Exposé's first top-10 pop hit since 1990's "Tell Me Why" and their last top-10 hit.

On the Billboard Year-End chart in 1993, the hit came in at number 23. Despite only peaking at number 8, the song is far closer to the year-end position of their number-one hit "Seasons Change", than to those of other top-ten hits of theirs.

== Music video ==
In the song's music video, Jurado walks pensively along the beach and thinks of her ex-boyfriend, played by actor and stuntman Greg Fitzpatrick, while Ann Curless and Kelly Moneymaker stand under a section of the boardwalk a few yards away from her. In other scenes, the three ladies sit in front of a fire or they walk around the boardwalk. There are also flashback scenes with Jurado and boyfriend having fun together. The video was shot around and under the Santa Monica Pier in Santa Monica, California.

== Track listings ==
7" single (UK) / cassette single (US) / mini-CD single (JP)

1. "I'll Never Get Over You (Getting Over Me)" – 3:48
2. "Give Me All Your Love" – 5:29

CD maxi-single (US)

1. "I'll Never Get Over You (Getting Over Me)" – 3:48
2. "Seasons Change" – 4:52
3. "Let Me Be the One" – 4:20
4. "When I Looked at Him" – 5:31
5. "Give Me All Your Love" – 5:29

CD single (UK)

1. "I'll Never Get Over You (Getting Over Me)" – 3:48
2. "Seasons Change" – 4:52
3. "Let Me Be the One" – 4:20
4. "Give Me All Your Love" – 5:29

CD single (DE)

1. "I'll Never Get Over You (Getting Over Me)" – 3:48
2. "Seasons Change" – 4:52
3. "Let Me Be the One" – 4:20
4. "I Wish the Phone Would Ring" – 4:06

== Charts ==
=== Weekly charts ===
Chart (1993)	Peak position
Canada Top Singles (RPM)	16
Canada Adult Contemporary (RPM)	1
UK Singles (Official Charts)	75
US Billboard Hot 100	8
US Adult Contemporary (Billboard)	1
US Pop Airplay (Billboard)	3
US Cash Box Top 100	6

=== Year-end charts ===
Chart (1993)	Position
US Billboard Hot 100	23
US Adult Contemporary (Billboard)	3

=== Certifications ===
Region	Certification	Certified units/sales
United States (RIAA)	Gold	500,000^{^}
^{^} Shipments figures based on certification alone.
