= As Long as I Can Dream =

Single by Exposé

from the album Exposé
- Released: July 1993
- Genre: Pop
- Length: 4:25 (single version); 4:49 (album version)
- Label: Arista
- Songwriters: Roy Orbison; Diane Warren
- Producers: Steve Thompson; Michael Barbiero

Exposé singles chronology
"I'll Never Get Over You Getting Over Me" (1993)	"As Long as I Can Dream" (1993)	"In Walked Love" (1994)

Music video
- "As Long as I Can Dream" on YouTube

"As Long as I Can Dream" is a song by the American girl group Exposé. It was co-written by Roy Orbison and Diane Warren and appears on the group's self-titled third album (1992). Lead vocals on the song were sung by Ann Curless and it features guitarist Al Pitrelli of Megadeth, Alice Cooper, Trans-Siberian Orchestra, one of two tracks he played. The single peaked at numbers 51 and 55 on the US Cash Box Top 100 and Billboard Hot 100, and at number 21 on the Billboard Adult Contemporary chart in 1993.

In 1999, singer Debelah Morgan recorded a cover version of the song that was included on the soundtrack to the film Stuart Little.

== Track listing ==
- 7" single (Arista)
1. "As Long as I Can Dream" – 4:49
2. "Face to Face" – 4:22
- CD maxi-single (Arista)
1. "As Long as I Can Dream" – 4:49
2. "Point of No Return" – 3:28
3. "Come Go with Me" – 4:17
4. "What You Don't Know" – 4:20
5. "Face to Face" – 4:22
- CD promo (Arista)
1. "As Long as I Can Dream" – 4:24
- Cassette single (Arista)
1. "As Long as I Can Dream" – 4:49
2. "Face to Face" – 4:22

== Charts ==
=== Weekly charts ===
Charts (1993)	Peak position
US Billboard Hot 100	55
US Adult Contemporary (Billboard)	21
US Cash Box Top 100	51

=== Year-end charts ===
Charts (1993)	Position
US Cash Box Top 100	31
