= I Wish the Phone Would Ring =

Single by Exposé

from the album Exposé
- Released: September 1992
- Genre: Dance, freestyle
- Length: 4:06
- Label: Arista
- Songwriters: Michael Jay; Marvin Morrow
- Producers: Steve Thompson; Michael Barbiero

Exposé singles chronology
"Stop, Listen, Look & Think" (1990)	"I Wish the Phone Would Ring" (1992)	"I'll Never Get Over You Getting Over Me" (1993)

"I Wish the Phone Would Ring" is a song by the American girl group Exposé, released in September 1992. The song was written by Michael Margules (also known as "Michael Jay") and Marvin Morrow, and it appears on Exposé's third and self-titled album (1992). The single is a mid-tempo dance-pop tune that lyrically describes how the singers desire to hear their lovers call them on the telephone in order to patch up their differences. Lead vocals on the song were performed by Jeanette Jurado. In addition to veteran members Jurado and Ann Curless, this was the first single released by Exposé to feature Kelly Moneymaker as a member of the group, since Gioia Bruno had departed in 1991 due to the discovery of a benign throat tumor.

== Reception ==
Released as the first single from the album in September 1992, "I Wish the Phone Would Ring" became the group's ninth Top 40 hit on the US Billboard Hot 100, reaching number 28 on the chart in December of that year. It also peaked at number 20 on the US Cash Box Top 100 in the same period. Although the song missed the Billboard Hot Dance Club Play chart, the 12" single did reach number 14 on the magazine's Hot Dance Singles Sales chart.

== Music video ==
The music video for "I Wish the Phone Would Ring" shows the members of the group wearing black shirts and blue jeans dancing and lip-syncing to the song. Interspersed with this are scenes of couples missing each other's phone messages, until the end of the video when the couples are able to connect. The official video was directed by Millicent Shelton.

== Track listing ==
12" single (US)
A1 "I Wish the Phone Would Ring" (Remix) – 6:18
A2 "I Wish the Phone Would Ring" (Exposed Mix) – 5:03
B1 "I Wish the Phone Would Ring" (Dub House Mix) – 6:57
B2 "I Wish the Phone Would Ring" (Album Version) – 4:06
B3 "I Wish the Phone Would Ring" (Acapella) – 3:21

Maxi-CD single (US)

1. "I Wish the Phone Would Ring" (Album Version) – 4:06
2. "I Wish the Phone Would Ring" (Remix) – 6:18
3. "I Wish the Phone Would Ring" (Exposed Mix) – 5:03
4. "I Wish the Phone Would Ring" (Dub House Mix) – 6:57
5. "I'll Never Get Over You Getting Over Me" – 3:49

Cassette single (US)

1. "I Wish the Phone Would Ring"
2. "I'll Never Get Over You Getting Over Me"

CD promo (US)

1. "I Wish the Phone Would Ring" (Single Version) – 3:54
2. "I Wish the Phone Would Ring" (Album Version) – 4:06

Maxi-CD single (AUS)

1. "I Wish the Phone Would Ring" (Album Mix) – 4:06
2. "I Wish the Phone Would Ring" (Remix) – 6:18
3. "I Wish the Phone Would Ring" (Exposed Mix) – 5:03
4. "I Wish the Phone Would Ring" (Dub House Mix) – 6:57
5. "I Wish the Phone Would Ring" (Single Mix) – 3:54
6. "I'll Never Get Over You Getting Over Me" – 3:49

Mini-CD single (JP)

1. "I Wish the Phone Would Ring" – 3:52
2. "I'll Never Get Over You Getting Over Me" – 3:49

== Charts ==
Chart (1992–1993)	Peak position
Australia (ARIA)	193
Canada Top Singles (RPM)	49
Iceland (Íslenski Listinn Topp 40)	19
US Billboard Hot 100	28
US Dance Singles Sales (Billboard)	14
US Pop Airplay (Billboard)	21
US Rhythmic Airplay (Billboard)	20
US Cash Box Top 100	20
