= When I Looked at Him =

Single by Exposé

from the album What You Don't Know
- Released: August 19, 1989
- Recorded: 1988–89
- Genre: Pop
- Length: 4:17 (single version); 5:32 (album version)
- Label: Arista
- Songwriter: Lewis A. Martineé
- Producer: Lewis A. Martineé

Exposé singles chronology
"What You Don't Know" (1989)	"When I Looked at Him" (1989)	"Tell Me Why" (1989)

"When I Looked at Him" is a song recorded by American Latin freestyle vocal group Exposé for their second studio album What You Don't Know (1989). It was released on August 19, 1989 as the second single from the album. It was written and produced by the group's founder, Lewis Martineé, and lead vocals on the track were sung by Jeanette Jurado.

== Background ==
The song is a pensive ballad closer in form and structure to the group's number-one hit "Seasons Change" than to many of their more dance-oriented songs. Still, an extended "Suave Mix" appeared on the CD version of What You Don't Know, and an acoustic version of this mix was included as the B-side to the single.

== Chart performance ==
Released as the follow-up single to "What You Don't Know", "When I Looked at Him" became Exposé's sixth consecutive top-ten single on the US Billboard Hot 100, peaking at number ten in October 1989. The single also reached number three on the Billboard Adult Contemporary chart.

== Track listing ==
=== U.S. 7" (vinyl and cassette) ===
A - "When I Looked at Him" (4:17)
B - "When I Looked at Him" Suave Mix acoustic version (5:19)

== Tracks ==
No.	Title	Length
1.	"When I Looked at Him" (Single Version)	4:17
2.	"When I Looked at Him" (Smooth Mix)	4:00
3.	"Megamix: "Point of No Return"; "Come Go with Me"; "Exposed to Love"	10:10

== Charts ==
=== Weekly charts ===
Chart (1989)	Peak position
Australia (ARIA Charts)	168
Belgium (Ultratop 50 Flanders)	34
Canada (RPM (magazine))	29
Canada (RPM Top 100 Singles)	18
Netherlands (Dutch Top 40)	7
Netherlands (Single Top 100)	5
US Billboard Hot 100	10
US Adult Contemporary (Billboard)	3

=== Year-end charts ===
Chart (1989)	Position
Netherlands (Dutch Top 40)	68
Netherlands (Single Top 100)	93
