= I Specialize in Love =

Single by Sharon Brown
- Released: March 1982
- Recorded: 1981
- Genre: Boogie; post-disco
- Length: 4:29 (7" version); 7:15 (12" version)
- Label: Profile (US); Virgin (UK)
- Songwriter(s): Lotti Golden; Richard Scher
- Producer(s): Eddie O'Loughlin

Sharon Brown singles chronology
"I Specialize in Love" (1982)	"Love Don't Hurt People" (1982)

"I Specialize in Love" is a song written by Lotti Golden and Richard Scher. Mixed by Tee Scott, the song was a club hit in the early 1980s when recorded by American singer Sharon Brown, the niece of songwriter Phil Medley. Released as a single in March 1982, by Profile Records, it spent three weeks at number two on the US Hot Dance Club Play chart, her only song to reach this survey. The single also charted on the UK Singles Chart, becoming an international club hit. A remixed version of the song was released in 1994, entering the UK Singles Chart for a second time.

Brian Chin of Billboard called "I Specialize in Love" a "very skillful pastiche of a whole passel of recent street and fusion sounds, along with a simple rap."

== Exposé version ==
"I Specialize in Love"

Single by Exposé

from the album Exposé
- Released: November 17, 1995
- Length: 3:53 (album version)
- Label: Arista
- Songwriter(s): Lotti Golden, Richard Scher
- Producer(s): DNA

Exposé singles chronology
"In Walked Love" (1993)	"I Specialize in Love" (1995)	"I'll Say Good-bye for the Two of Us" (1995)

Ten years later, the American girl group Exposé included a cover version of the song on its 1992 self-titled studio album. This version featured lead vocals by Ann Curless, Jeanette Jurado and Kelly Moneymaker. It was produced by DNA (musicians Nick Batt and Neal Slateford), which had scored a hit in 1990 for themselves and Suzanne Vega when the group remixed Vega's song "Tom's Diner." Although this version of "I Specialize in Love" was not formally released as a single from the album Exposé, it was issued as a promotional 12" single to dance clubs in 1995 when various remixes of the song by Darrin Friedman were included on the CD Maxi-single release of "I'll Say Good-bye for the Two of Us." This latter song was taken from the soundtrack of the 1995 film Free Willy 2, and although both songs failed to reach the Billboard Hot 100 chart, "I Specialize in Love" became a top-ten single on the Billboard Club Play chart again, peaking at #6. It also reached the top twenty on the Billboard Hot Dance Singles Sales chart in December of that year.

== Track listing ==
=== Sharon Brown version ===
12" promo

- US: Profile, UK: Virgin / 1982
1. A - "I Specialize In Love" (7:16)
2. B - "I Specialize In Love" (instrumental) (6:00)

=== Exposé version ===
12" promo

- US: Arista / 1995
1. A1 - "I Specialize in Love" Spike Club Mix I (7:16)
2. A2 - "I Specialize in Love" Spike Dub (6:45)
3. B1 - "I Specialize in Love" Spike Club Mix II (8:02)
4. B2 - "I Specialize in Love" Spike Classic Mix (6:13)

== Charts ==
Sharon Brown version

Chart (1982)	Peak position
U.S. Billboard Hot Dance Club Play	2
UK Singles Chart	38
U.S. BillboardHot Soul Singles	51
Netherlands	21

Exposé version

Chart (1995)	Peak position
U.S. Billboard Hot Dance Club Play	6
U.S. Billboard Hot Dance Singles Sales	20
