= Exposé (Exposé album) =

Studio album by Exposé
- Released: October 9, 1992
- Recorded: 1991–1992
- Genre: Freestyle; dance; adult contemporary
- Length: 53:55
- Label: Arista
- Producer: Steve Thompson; Michael Barbiero; Lewis A. Martineé; Guy Roche; DNA; Davidge

Exposé chronology
What You Don't Know (1989)	Exposé (1992)	Greatest Hits (1995)

Singles from Exposé
- 1. "I Wish the Phone Would Ring" Released: September 1992; 2. "I'll Never Get Over You Getting Over Me" Released: February 1993; 3. "As Long as I Can Dream" Released: July 1993; 4. "In Walked Love" Released: January 1994; 5. "I Specialize in Love" Released: November 17, 1995

Professional ratings
Review scores
Source	Rating
AllMusic	4/5 stars
Robert Christgau	(dud)
Entertainment Weekly	B+

Exposé is the third studio album by American vocal group Exposé, released in 1992. The album's music style is less Latin influenced than their previous albums, with more adult contemporary material. The album features more of Ann Curless on lead vocals; she sings lead on "I Think I'm in Trouble," "As Long as I Can Dream," "In Walked Love," and "Angel." This album marks the debut of Kelly Moneymaker as a member of the group. To date, it is the group's last studio album release.

For the track "I Specialize in Love," Jeanette Jurado (who provides the lead vocals for the majority of the album) sings co-lead with Curless, and then shares lead vocals with Curless and Moneymaker during the final bridge.

"I Specialize in Love", "Angel", and "The Same Love" are covers of previously recorded songs; "Angel" was written and recorded by Maria Vidal in 1987, "I Specialize in Love" was a dance hit for Sharon Brown in 1982, while "The Same Love" was a minor hit for the Jets in 1989.

The album was recorded at several studios in the United States—The Hit Factory, Home Boy Recording Studio, Right Track Studios, Sabella Recording Studios, River Sound, Sear Sound, Countdown Recording Studios, Criterion Studios, Conway Recording Studios, Music Grinder—as well as H'Appeny Bridge in the United Kingdom and Soundtrack Recording. The song "I Specialize in Love" was recorded at The Hit Factory, H'Appeny and Soundtrack Recording.

== Track listing ==
No.	Title	Writer(s)	Producer	Length
1.	"I Think I'm in Trouble"	Kevin Calhoun, Matt Noble, Shelly Peiken	Steve Thompson and Michael Barbiero	4:16
2.	"You Don't Know What You Got"	Lewis A. Martineé, Hector Almaguer, Enrique Garcia	Lewis A. Martineé	4:20
3.	"I Wish the Phone Would Ring"	Michael Jay, Marvin Morrow	Thompson and Barbiero	4:06
4.	"As Long as I Can Dream"	Diane Warren, Roy Orbison	Thompson and Barbiero	4:49
5.	"In Walked Love"	Warren	Thompson and Barbiero	4:51
6.	"I'll Never Get Over You Getting Over Me"	Warren	Guy Roche	3:49
7.	"Angel"	Robbie Seidman, Maria Vidal	Thompson and Barbiero	5:14
8.	"Face to Face"	Martineé	Martineé	4:22
9.	"I Specialize in Love"	Lotti Golden, Richard Scher	Thompson and Barbiero, DNA	3:53
10.	"Touch and Go"	Irmgard Klarmann, Felix Weber	Martineé	4:45
11.	"The Same Love"	Warren	Roche	3:59
12.	"Give Me All Your Love"	Martineé	Martineé	5:31
Total length:				53:55

German edition bonus track
No.	Title	Writer(s)	Producer	Length
13.	"I Wish the Phone Would Ring" (Exposed Mix)	Jay, Morrow	Thompson and Barbiero	5:04
Total length:				58:59

== Personnel ==
=== Exposé ===
- Jeanette Jurado – lead vocals (2, 3, 6, 8, 10, 11, 12), vocals (9), backing vocals
- Ann Curless – lead vocals (1, 4, 5, 7), vocals (9), backing vocals
- Kelly Moneymaker – vocals (9, 10), backing vocals

=== Musicians ===
- Bobby Pruit – backing vocals (10)
- Victor Bailey – bass (4, 5)
- Seymour Barab, Richard Locker, Mark Schuman – cello (4)
- Omar Hakim – drums (4, 5)
- Lewis A. Martineé – drums (2, 8, 10, 12)
- Ben Stivers – drums (2, 8, 10, 12)
- John Clark, Peter Gordon – French Horn (4)
- Al Pitrelli – guitar (4, 5)
- Tim Mitchell – guitar (4, 11), guitar solo (6)
- Michael Thompson – guitar (6, 11)
- Paul Pesco – guitar (7)
- Gary King – guitar (8, 10)
- Fred McFarlane – instruments (1), rhythm programming (1, 3, 7), additional keyboards (9)
- Lewis A. Martineé – keyboards (2, 8, 10, 12), percussion (2, 8, 10, 12)
- Greg Phillinganes – keyboards (4, 5)
- Ben Stivers – keyboards (2, 8, 10, 12), percussion (2, 8, 10, 12)
- Dave LeBolt – additional keyboards (7)
- Robert Magnuson – oboe (4)
- Kenny The Man – rap (3)
- Tom Timko – saxophone (6)
- Alfred Brown, Julien Barber, Olivia Koppell – viola (4)
- Lamar Alsop, Elena Barere, Regis Iandiorio, Charles Libove, Carmel Malin, Anthony Posk, Elliot Rosoff, Richard Sortomme, Gerald Tarack – violin (4)

=== Production ===
- Steve Thompson and Michael Barbiero – producer (1, 3, 4, 5, 7, 9)
- Lewis A. Martineé – producer (2, 8, 10, 12)
- Guy Roche – producer (6, 11)
- DNA – producer (9)
- Steve Thompson and Michael Barbiero – arrangements (1, 3, 4, 5, 7)
- Lewis A. Martineé – arrangements (2, 8, 10, 12)
- Exposé – backing vocals arrangements (3, 6, 11)
- Eve Nelson – backing vocals arrangements (4, 5)
- Jesse Levy – string arrangement (4)
- Michael Barbiero – engineer (1, 3, 4, 5, 7)
- Lewis A. Martineé – engineer (2, 8, 10, 12)
- Mario Luccy, Arthur Payson, Brett Swain, Frank Wolf – engineer (6, 11)
- Gary Tole, Lolly Grodner, Rich Travali – additional engineering (1, 3, 4, 5, 7)
- Lee Anthony, David Michael Dill, Nathaniel Foster, Kenny Giola, Andy Grassi, Lolly Grodner, Fred Kevorkian, Gary Tole – assistant engineer (1, 3, 4, 5, 7)
- Lawrence Ethan, Mario Luccy, Brett Swain – assistant engineer (6, 11)
- Rique Alonso, Femio "1" Hernandez, Jason "Stop-Phonie" Roberts – assistant engineer (2, 8, 10, 12)
- Mike Couzzi – vocal engineering (2, 8, 12)
- Steve Thompson & Michael Barbiero – mixing (1, 3, 4, 5, 7, 9)
- Chris Lord Alge, Lewis A. Martineé – mixing (2, 8, 10, 12)
- Brian Malouf – mixing (6, 11)
- Pat MacDougall – mixing assistant (6, 11)
- Clive Davis – executive producer
- Maude Gilman – art direction
- Calvin Lowery – design
- Daniel L. Miller – photography
- Pantera Group Enterprises, Inc. – direction

== Charts ==
Chart performance for Exposé
Chart (1992–1993)	Peak position
US Billboard 200	135
US Top R&B/Hip-Hop Albums (Billboard)	93

== Certifications ==
Certifications for Exposure
Region	Certification	Certified units/sales
United States (RIAA)	Gold	500,000^{^}
^{^} Shipments figures based on certification alone.
