= Stop, Listen, Look & Think =

Single by Exposé

from the album What You Don't Know
- Released: July 1990
- Genre: Freestyle, Dance
- Length: 4:05 (album version)
- Label: Arista
- Songwriter: Lewis Martineé
- Producer: Lewis Martineé

Exposé singles chronology
| "Your Baby Never Looked Good in Blue" (1990) | "Stop, Listen, Look & Think" (1990) | "I Wish the Phone Would Ring" (1992) |

"Stop, Listen, Look & Think" is a song by the American girl group Exposé. It was written and produced by the group's founder, Lewis Martineé, and can be found on their 1989 second album, What You Don't Know. It was the first single released by Exposé to feature Ann Curless on lead vocals. The song was also included on the soundtrack to the Lambada-themed film The Forbidden Dance, which was released in the U.S. in March 1990. This is the final single to feature Gioia Bruno as a member of the group.

Allmusic states that "Stop, Listen, Look & Think" is one of the best tracks on What You Don't Know and describes it as "a subtler uptempo number with an understated yet memorable lead by" Curless.

== Reception ==
The single for "Stop, Listen, Look & Think" was remixed and issued as a promotional 12" single to nightclubs in the U.S. The song peaked at #19 on the Billboard Hot Dance Club Play chart in December 1990, the group's seventh entry on this survey.

== Track listing ==
12" single (US)
A1. "Stop, Listen, Look & Think" (House Mix) – 7:36
A2. "Stop, Listen, Look & Think" (Dub Mix) – 5:17
B1. "Stop, Listen, Look & Think" (Deep Thought Mix) – 5:49
B2. "Stop, Listen, Look & Think" (L.A. Mix) – 6:23

12" single (MEX) / Cassette single (MEX)
A1. Stop, Listen, Look & Think" (Lambada Mix) – 4:21
B1. Stop, Listen, Look & Think" (Lambada Mix) – 4:21
B2. Stop, Listen, Look & Think" (Lambada Mix) (Radio Edit) – 3:15
