= What You Don't Know (Exposé song) =

Single by Exposé

from the album What You Don't Know
- B-side: "Walk Along with Me"
- Released: May 20, 1989
- Recorded: 1988
- Studio: Countdown Recording Studios (Miami, Florida)
- Genre: Freestyle; dance-pop
- Length: 3:58 (single version); 4:46 (album version)
- Label: Arista
- Songwriter: Lewis A. Martineé
- Producer: Lewis A. Martineé

Exposé singles chronology
"Seasons Change" (1987)	"What You Don't Know" (1989)	"When I Looked at Him" (1989)

"What You Don't Know" is a song recorded by American Latin freestyle vocal group Exposé for their 1989 second studio album of the same name. Written and produced by the group's founder Lewis A. Martineé, the lead vocals on "What You Don't Know" were performed by Gioia Bruno.

"What You Don't Know" was released as the lead single from the album on May 20, 1989, by Arista Records, and peaked at number eight on the US Billboard Hot 100 in July 1989, extending the group's streak of consecutive top-ten US pop hits to five. On the Billboard Dance Club Songs chart, it reached number two and number eight on the Billboard Dance/Electronic Singles Sales chart. It was the first single by the group to be certified Gold by the Recording Industry Association of America (RIAA). In the United Kingdom, the single peaked for two weeks at number 99 on the UK Singles Chart in September 1989.

== Background and composition ==
"What You Don't Know" features a prominent horn section accompanying the singers, and there is a guitar solo between the second and third verses. Although the group continued to have success on the dance charts, this was one of the final Exposé pop hits featuring a beat, with which they had become associated from most of the singles off their previous album, Exposure (1987). Many of the singles released by the group from this point on were mid-tempo or ballads.

== Music video ==
The accompanying music video for "What You Don't Know" features the singers rehearsing with a band on stage, then near the end of the music video the girls rush back to be with their respective boyfriends.

== Track listing ==
US 7" vinyl single (Arista Records AS1-9836)

A "What You Don't Know" – 3:58
B "Walk Along with Me" – 3:49

US 12" vinyl single (Arista Records AD1-9837)

A1 "What You Don't Know (Atomic Mix)" – 6:35
A2 "What You Don't Know (Might Hurt You Beats)" – 2:36
A3 "What You Don't Know (Radio Mix)" – 4:10
B1 "What You Don't Know (Bass Mix)" – 7:09
B2 "What You Don't Know (Crossover Mix)" – 6:36

== Credits and personnel ==
- Gioia Bruno – lead vocals
- Ann Curless – backing vocals
- Jeanette Jurado – backing vocals
- Lewis A. Martineé – writing, producer, engineer, mixing
- "Little" Cesar Sogbe – engineer (assistant engineer)
- Mike Couzzi – engineer (brass recording engineer)
- Ismael Garcia – executive producer
- Francisco J. Diaz – executive producer
- Mike Fuller – mastering
- Rique "Billy Bob" Alonso – mixing

== Charts ==
=== Weekly charts ===
Chart (1989)	Peak position
Australia (ARIA)	69
Canada Top Singles (RPM)	17
Netherlands (Dutch Top 40)	55
UK Singles (Official Charts)	99
US Billboard Hot 100	8
US Dance Club Songs (Billboard)	2
Venezuela (UPI)	9

=== Year-end charts ===
Chart (1989)	Position
US Billboard Hot 100	97
