= Paris by Air =

- Origin: Miami
- Genres: Latin freestyle
- Years active: 1985–present
- Label: Columbia Records
- Members: Terri Gil; Rick Munarriz; Willie Cleer
- Past members: Haydee Rivera

Paris by Air is an American Latin freestyle trio from Miami, composed of Terri Gil, Rick Munarriz and Willie Cleer. The band was formed in 1985 by Rick, Willie, and original lead singer Haydee Rivera. The band signed a production deal in 1986 with producer Lewis A. Martineé, who was also responsible for the group Exposé. The band was signed to Sony's Columbia Records label in 1987, but did not have a label release until 1989's "Voices in Your Head" which peaked at #14 on the Billboard Dance chart. Unlike many of the Latin freestyle artists emerging from Miami in the late 1980s, Paris by Air wrote their own songs and played live instruments on stage. 1990's "C'mon and Dance with Me" peaked at #37 on the Billboard Dance chart. Rivera left in 1991 to pursue a solo career. She currently records under the artist name Eday. Terri Gil joined the band after the band was dropped from Sony, in time to release "I'm Serious" in 1992. "All Around the Sound" and "Don't Close Your Eyes in the Dark" were featured in the 2001 thriller Serial Intentions. The trio was honored in 2010 as recipients of the Miami Dance Music Awards.

== Discography ==
=== Albums ===
- First Flight (2011) (self-released)
- All Around the Sound (2011) (compilation, self-released)
- Second Wave (2012) (self-released)
- Three If by Air (2013) (self-released)

=== Singles ===
- "Voices in Your Head" (1989) - US Dance #14
- "C'mon and Dance with Me" (1990) - US Dance #37
- "I'm Serious" (1992)
- "All Around the Sound" (1996)
