= Your Baby Never Looked Good in Blue =

Single by Exposé

from the album What You Don't Know
- B-side: "Now That I Found You"
- Released: March 21, 1990
- Genre: Pop
- Length: 3:54
- Label: Arista
- Songwriter: Diane Warren
- Producer: Lewis Martineé

Exposé singles chronology
"Tell Me Why" (1989)	"Your Baby Never Looked Good in Blue" (1990)	"Stop, Listen, Look & Think" (1990)

Your Baby Never Looked Good in Blue is a single by Exposé, released on March 21, 1990. Written by Diane Warren and produced by Lewis Martineé, the song was included on the group's second studio album, What You Don't Know. Lead vocals on the track were performed by Jeanette Jurado. The song was the fourth single released from What You Don't Know, and it is a romance-themed ballad sung from the perspective of a person whose lover is rumored to have "found someone new".

== Background ==
Composer Diane Warren had submitted "Your Baby Never Looked Good in Blue" for consideration for Exposé to record along with the Warren composition "I'll Never Get Over You Getting Over Me": Arista president Clive Davis had indicated that only one of those two songs could be recorded by the group and while Jurado – who considered "both beautiful songs" – had favored the latter, the group's producer Lewis Martineé opted for "Your Baby Never Looked Good in Blue". (Exposé would be able to record "I'll Never Get Over You Getting Me" for their 1992 album Exposé with the track becoming a Top Ten hit.)

== Reception ==
Los Angeles Times music critic Dennis Hunt, in a dismissive review of the What You Don't Know album, mentioned "Your Baby Never Looked Good in Blue" - (Dennis Hunt quote:) "which has mournful country-style lyrics" - as the album's "one top notch song".

== Music video ==
The music video shows scenes of the three vocalists performing at a concert, preparing for the performance backstage and surrounding a tour bus.

== Track listing ==
=== U.S. 7" single (vinyl and cassette) ===
A - "Your Baby Never Looked Good in Blue" (3:54)
B - "Now That I Found You" (3:46)

== Charts ==
Chart (1990)	Peak position
Canada RPM Adult Contemporary	19
Canada RPM Top 100 Singles	17
US Adult Contemporary	9
US Billboard Hot 100	17
US Cash Box Top 100	16
