= Let Me Be the One (Exposé song) =

Single by Exposé

from the album Exposure
- B-side: "Love Is Our Destiny"
- Released: 1987
- Recorded: 1986
- Genre: Freestyle
- Length: 4:18 (album version); 3:56 (single version)
- Label: Arista
- Songwriter: Lewis Martineé
- Producer: Lewis Martineé

Exposé singles chronology
"Come Go with Me" (1986)	"Let Me Be the One" (1987)	"Seasons Change" (1987)

Let Me Be the One is a single by Exposé, released in 1987. It was written and produced by Lewis Martineé and appears on their debut album, Exposure. The lead vocals on the song were performed by Gioia Bruno.

== Reception ==
Released as a single in 1987, "Let Me Be the One" became the group's third consecutive top-ten single on the Billboard Hot 100 chart in October of that year, when it peaked at No. 7. The song also reached No. 2 on the Billboard Hot Dance Club Play chart. In the United Kingdom, the song reached No. 76 on the British pop chart.

== Track listing ==
7" single

No.	Title	Length
1.	"Let Me Be the One" (Single Version)	3:56
2.	"Love Is Our Destiny"	3:16

12" single

No.	Title	Length
1.	"Let Me Be the One" (Extended Mix)	8:04
2.	"Let Me Be the One" ("Crossover" Mix)	4:54
3.	"Let Me Be the One" (Single Version)	3:56
4.	"Let Me Be the One" (Dub Mix)	8:34

UK 12" single

No.	Title	Length
1.	"Let Me Be the One" (Extended Mix)	8:04
2.	"Let Me Be the One" ("Crossover" Mix)	4:54
3.	"Love Is Our Destiny"	3:16

Germany CD single

No.	Title	Length
1.	"Let Me Be the One" (Remix)	8:04
2.	"Love Is Our Destiny"	3:16
3.	"Megamix ": "Point of No Return"; "Come Go with Me"; "Exposed to Love"	10:02 a.m.

== Charts ==
=== Weekly charts ===
Weekly chart performance for "Let Me Be the One"
Chart (1987)	Peak position
Canada Top Singles (RPM)	47
UK Singles (Official Charts)	76
US Billboard Hot 100	7
US Dance Club Songs (Billboard)	2
US Dance Singles Sales (Billboard)	13
US Hot R&B/Hip-Hop Songs (Billboard)	29
US Cash Box Top 100 Singles	8
US Top Black Contemporary Singles (Cash Box)	33

=== Year-end charts ===
Year-end chart performance for "Let Me Be the One"
Chart (1987)	Position
US Billboard Hot 100	77
US Crossover Singles (Billboard)	13
