= Tell Me Why (Exposé song) =

Single by Exposé

from the album What You Don't Know
- B-side: "Let Me Down Easy"
- Released: December 9, 1989
- Length: 5:26 (album version); 4:35 (single version)
- Label: Arista
- Songwriter: Lewis Martineé
- Producer: Lewis Martineé

Exposé singles chronology
"When I Looked at Him" (1989)	"Tell Me Why" (1989)	"Your Baby Never Looked Good in Blue" (1990)

"Tell Me Why" is a single by Exposé, released on December 9, 1989. It was written and produced by Lewis Martineé. The song was included on Exposé's second album, What You Don't Know. Lead vocals on "Tell Me Why" were sung by Gioia Bruno.

== Reception ==
Released as the third single from What You Don't Know, "Tell Me Why" continued a successful streak for the group on the Billboard Hot 100 chart when it peaked at #9 in early 1990. It was Exposé's seventh consecutive top ten hit on the Hot 100, dating back to "Come Go with Me" in April 1987. Remixes of the song were popular in U.S. dance clubs, allowing it to reach #3 on the Billboard Hot Dance Club Play chart, the group's fifth top ten single on this survey. The song reached the lower region of the UK Singles Chart, spending one week at #97.

== Music video ==
The music video shows the members of Exposé lip-synching the song interspersed with scenes implying urban gang violence. Lyrics such as Give me a reason for all this senseless crime / We can change it, why they have to die support an ultimate message of appealing to stop these sorts of activities. The video concludes with images of children playing and singing together on a playground.

== Track listing ==
=== U.K. 12" vinyl ===
A1 - "Tell Me Why" 12" Remix (6:28)
B1 - "Tell Me Why" Extended Remix (6:38)
B2 - "Let Me Down Easy" (4:07)

== Tracks ==
United States 12 "Single

No.	Title	Length
1.	"Tell Me Why" (No Name Mix Part 1 (Dub) / Part 2 (Vocals))	10:22
2.	"Let Me Down Easy" (Radio Mix)	4:50
3.	"Tell Me Why" (Groovehouse Mix)	7:37
4.	"Tell Me Why" (Extended Remix)	6:40

U.S. Promo CD Single

No.	Title	Length
1.	"Tell Me Why" (Remix Radio Edit)	4:26
2.	"Tell Me Why" (Radio Edit)	4:27
3.	"Tell Me Why" (Extended Remix)	6:39
4.	"Tell Me Why"	5:21

UK Promo CD Single

No.	Title	Length
1.	"Tell Me Why" (Dakeyne and Steve Anderson Remix)	3:59
2.	"Tell Me Why" (Dakeyne And Steve Anderson 12 "Remix)	6:28
3.	"Let Me Down Easy"	4:50

== Performance on the charts ==
Record chart (1989/1990)	Peak position
Australia (ARIA Charts)	157
Canada (RPM (magazine))	15
Canada (RPM Top 100 Singles)	34
United States ( Billboard Hot 100)	9
United States (Hot Dance Music/Club Play)	3
United States (Hot Dance Music/Maxi-Singles Sales)	26
Netherlands (MegaCharts)	78
United Kingdom (UK Singles Chart)	97
