= Expose This =

Studio album by Gioia
- Released: July 13, 2004
- Genre: Dance
- Label: Koch
- Producer: Mauro DeSantis; DJ Strobe; Pete Lorimer; Eve Nelson; Dennis Nieves; Charlie "Steele" Pennachio

Professional ratings
Review scores
Source	Rating
Warr.org	1/5 stars

Expose This is the solo debut by Gioia, a member of Exposé. The album includes the two Top 40 Hot Dance Music/Club Play hits, "Be Mine" (which reached #40) and "Incredible".

"I Was Made For Loving You" is a Kiss cover.

== Track listing ==
No.	Title	Length
1.	"Be Mine"	3:36
2.	"I Was Made for Loving You"	4:06
3.	"Happy"	3:26
4.	"Incredible"	3:26
5.	"Every Little Thing"	3:55
6.	"Barely Breathing"	8:24
7.	"Addicted"	4:43
8.	"I Can Feel You"	3:39
9.	"Again and Again"	3:33
10.	"Just Another Day"	3:10
11.	"Going Going Gone"	4:23
12.	"I Need You"	4:03
13.	"Until the End of Time"	3:30
14.	"Be Mine" (DJ Strobe Planetary Orbit Radio Edit)	3:53

== Critical response ==
Billboard gave a generally favorable review, praising its "energetic pop sensibilities" but criticising "Until the End of Time" as "trite" and saying it and her Kiss cover "I Was Made For Loving You" "miss the mark". About.com gave it 4/5, praising her songwriting as well as performance.
