= Come Go with Me (Exposé song) =

Single by Exposé

from the album Exposure
- B-side: "December"
- Released: January 1987
- Recorded: October 1985 – March 1986
- Genre: Freestyle; electropop
- Length: 3:29 (single version); 4:18 (album version)
- Label: Arista
- Songwriter: Lewis A. Martineé
- Producer: Lewis A. Martineé

Exposé singles chronology
"Exposed to Love" (1985)	"Come Go with Me" (1987)	"Let Me Be the One" (1987)

"Come Go with Me" is a song by American girl group Exposé from their debut studio album Exposure (1987). Composed and produced by Lewis A. Martineé, the song was released in January 1987 as the third single from Exposure. The group’s second lineup recorded "Come Go with Me", with Jeanette Jurado singing lead vocals, and Gioia Bruno and Ann Curless singing backup. Some vocals from the original lineup of Exposé remain in the released track.

== Background and release ==
In 1985 Exposé had two club hits, "Point of No Return" and "Exposed to Love". Between 1985 and 1986, the three original members of Exposé left the group and were replaced by Jurado, Bruno and Curless. These new members re-recorded vocals on "Point of No Return" and both songs were included on the album. Although "Come Go with Me" was the third single released from Exposure, the other two songs were familiar to fans of the group and its music.

== Chart performance ==
In the United States, "Come Go with Me" spent two weeks at the summit of the Billboard Dance Club Songs chart in January 1987, becoming their second single to achieve such feat. The 12" single also reached number two on the Billboard Dance/Electronic Singles Sales chart."Come Go with Me" became Exposé's first single to reach the US Billboard Hot 100 chart, where it peaked at number five in April 1987 and remained in the Top 40 for 12 weeks. The single also peaked at number 19 in Canada.

== Track listing and formats ==
US 7" single

No.	Title	Length
1.	"Come Go with Me"	3:29
2.	"December"	4:00

US 12" single

No.	Title	Length
1.	"Come Go with Me" (12" Mix)	6:30
2.	"Come Dub with Me"	7:00
3.	"Come Go with Me" (Radio Mix)	3:45

UK 12" single

No.	Title	Length
1.	"Come Go with Me" (12" Mix)	6:30
2.	"December"	4:00
3.	"Come Dub with Me"	7:00
4.	"Come Go with Me" (Radio Mix)	3:45

== Charts ==
=== Weekly charts ===
Weekly chart performance for "Come Go with Me"
Chart (1987)	Peak position
Canada Top Singles (RPM)	19
US Billboard Hot 100	5
US Dance Club Songs (Billboard)	1
US Dance Singles Sales (Billboard)	2
US Hot R&B/Hip-Hop Songs (Billboard)	14
US Cash Box Top 100 Singles	5
US Top Black Contemporary Singles (Cash Box)	12

=== Year-end charts ===
Year-end chart performance for "Come Go with Me"
Chart (1987)	Position
US Billboard Hot 100	62
US Dance Club Songs (Billboard)	3
US Dance Singles Sales (Billboard)	4
