= Exposure (Exposé album) =

1987 studio album by Exposé

Studio album by Exposé
- Released: February 3, 1987
- Recorded: April 1985 – January 1987
- Studio: Unique Recording (New York City)
- Genres: Freestyle; pop
- Length: 44:36
- Label: Arista
- Producer: Lewis A. Martineé

Exposé chronology
| Exposure (1987) | What You Don't Know (1989) |

Singles from Exposure
- 1. "Point of No Return" Released: March 11, 1985; April 1987 (re-recorded); 2. "Exposed to Love" Released: December 1985; 3. "Come Go with Me" Released: January 1987; 4. "Let Me Be the One" Released: August 1987; 5. "Seasons Change" Released: November 1987

Professional ratings
Review scores
| Source | Rating |
|---|---|
| AllMusic | 4.5/5 stars |
| Robert Christgau | B− |
| The Rolling Stone Album Guide | 3/5 stars |

Exposure is the debut studio album by American girl group Exposé, released on February 3, 1987, by Arista Records. It reached number 16 on the Billboard 200 and number 20 on the Top R&B/Hip-Hop Albums chart, and was certified double platinum by the Recording Industry Association of America (RIAA) in May 1990. The album spawned four top-ten singles on the Billboard Hot 100 chart, including "Seasons Change", which topped the chart in February 1988. Other successful singles were the breakthrough single "Come Go with Me" (number 5 U.S.), a re-recorded version of the song "Point of No Return" (number 5 U.S.), and "Let Me Be the One" (number 7 U.S.). This was the first debut album by a group to feature four top-10 entries on the Billboard Hot 100 – a feat Cyndi Lauper achieved as a solo artist with her 1983 album She's So Unusual.

When first released, the album featured the original 1984 recording of "Point of No Return", with lead vocals by Alé Lorenzo. On all subsequent versions, including its release on compact disc, the re-recording with Jeanette Jurado on lead is featured, which was also the single version released to radio several years after the original made its rounds on urban radio and in clubs. However, all pressings of the album feature the original 1985 recording of "Exposed to Love", with lead vocals by Alé Lorenzo.

Lead vocals of the majority of the album were sung by Jurado. Gioia Bruno and Ann Curless each sing lead on two tracks, with Bruno on "Let Me Be the One" and "December", and Curless on "Extra Extra" and "Love Is Our Destiny". On the track "I Know You Know", Jurado sings lead, then Bruno provides a soulful improvisation at the end.

== Track listing ==
All tracks written by Lewis Martineé, except where noted.

| No. | Title | Writer(s) | Length |
|---|---|---|---|
| 1. | "Come Go with Me" (recorded October 1985 – March 1986) | | 4:19 |
| 2. | "Let Me Be the One" (recorded August 1986 – January 1987) | | 4:18 |
| 3. | "Exposed to Love" (recorded April–August 1985) | | 3:35 |
| 4. | "Seasons Change" (recorded October 1986 – January 1987) | | 4:55 |
| 5. | "Extra Extra" (recorded July 1986) | | 3:47 |
| 6. | "Point of No Return" (recorded December 1984 – February 1985, re-recorded 1987) | | 6:09 |
| 7. | "Love Is Our Destiny" (recorded August 1986 – January 1987) | Jay Martin, Alex Villa-Lobos, Martineé | 3:21 |
| 8. | "I Know You Know" (recorded August 1986 – January 1987) | | 4:00 |
| 9. | "You're the One I Need" (recorded October 1986 – January 1987) | | 4:14 |
| 10. | "December" (recorded January 1986) | Fro Sosa, Martineé | 6:06 |

2015 Cherry Pop deluxe edition (bonus tracks)
| No. | Title | Length |
|---|---|---|
| 11. | "Point of No Return" (1985 Single Version) |
| 12. | "Exposed to Love" (Single Mix) |
| 13. | "Come Go with Me" (Single Mix) |
| 14. | "December" (Single Version) |
| 15. | "Point of No Return" (1987 Single Version) |
| 16. | "Let Me Be the One" (Remix Edit/Single Version) |
| 17. | "Seasons Change" (Radio Mix) |
| 18. | "Point of No Return" (PWL UK 7-inch Remix) |

2015 Cherry Pop deluxe edition (bonus disc)

1. "Exposed to Love" (Extended Mix)
2. "Come Go with Me" (Extended Mix)
3. "Point of No Return" (Extended Mix)
4. "Let Me Be the One" (Extended Remix)
5. "Seasons Change" (Extended Mix)
6. "Come Go with Me" (Radio Mix)
7. "Point of No Return" (Crossover Mix)
8. "Let Me Be the One" ("Crossover" Mix)
9. "Seasons Change" (Crossover Mix)
10. "Point of No Return" (PWL UK Extended Mix)
11. "Let Me Be the One" (UK Remix)

== Personnel ==
=== Exposé ===
- Alé, Sandée, and Laurie Miller (original line-up): lead and backing vocals on "Point of No Return" (original version, first pressing), "Exposed to Love"
- Ann Curless ("Extra Extra" and "Love Is Our Destiny"), Gioia Bruno ("Let Me Be the One", "I Know You Know" and "December"), Jeanette Jurado ("Come Go with Me", "Seasons Change", "Point of No Return", "I Know You Know" and "You're the One I Need"): lead and backing vocals on all other tracks

=== Musicians ===
- Nestor Gomez: lead and rhythm guitar
- George "Jet" Finess: lead guitar on "Point of No Return," "Exposed to Love", and "December"
- Steve Grove: saxophone
- Fro Sosa: keyboards, synthesizers, and synth solos
- Lewis A. Martineé: keyboards, percussion and drum programming

=== Technical ===
- Executive producers: Francisco J. Diaz (for Pantera Productions) and Ed Eckstine
- Arranged and produced by Lewis A. Martineé for Pantera Productions
- Recorded and engineered by Mike Couzzi & John Hagg
- Assistant recording engineers: Carlos Santos, Terresa Verplanck, David Barton, Carlos Nieto, Frank Prinzel, Sam Safirstein, Victor Di Persia, Ernie Williams, Charles Dye and Barabara Milne
- Mixed by Lewis A. Martineé and Chris Lord-Alge
- Mastered by José Rodriguez

== Charts ==
=== Weekly charts ===
Weekly chart performance for Exposure
| Chart (1987–1988) | Peak position |
|---|---|
| Canada Top Albums/CDs (RPM) | 61 |
| US Billboard 200 | 16 |
| US Top R&B/Hip-Hop Albums (Billboard) | 20 |

=== Year-end charts ===
1987 weekly chart performance for Exposure
| Chart (1987) | Position |
|---|---|
| US Billboard 200 | 29 |
| US Top R&B/Hip-Hop Albums (Billboard) | 38 |

1988 weekly chart performance for Exposure
| Chart (1988) | Position |
|---|---|
| US Billboard 200 | 39 |
| US Top R&B/Hip-Hop Albums (Billboard) | 78 |

== Certifications ==
Certifications for Exposure
| Region | Certification | Certified units/sales |
|---|---|---|
| Canada (Music Canada) | Gold | 50,000^{^} |
| United States (RIAA) | 2× Platinum | 2,000,000^{^} |
^{^} Shipments figures based on certification alone.
