= Sharon Brown (singer) =

American singer-songwriter and musician

- Born: Harlem, New York City, United States
- Genres: Soul; Post-disco
- Occupation: Singer-songwriter
- Instrument: Vocals
- Years active: 1975–present
- Label: Profile Records

Sharon Brown is an American singer-songwriter and musician who was born in Harlem, New York City. She is the niece of songwriter Phil Medley, who co-wrote the song "Twist and Shout". She is also the daughter of drummer William Brown, who played with musicians such as The Isley Brothers and Cannonball Adderley.

== Career ==
Brown co-wrote and sang backup vocals on the 1976 release of CBS Rock Band "Blood Sweat & Tears" Mirror's Image " LP song titled "Love Looks Good On You" former lead vocalist for Rare Earth, Jerry La Croix. In addition to starting her own music publishing company, Tshaym music publishing company BMI, she has also worked with acts such as Ronnie Dyson from the Broadway hit play Hair singing "Aquarius". Sharon Brown also acted as musical coordinator and songwriter worked alongside Todd Rundgren.

She and her bandmate keyboardist Ronnie Bishop wrote a song called "The Family Tree" in 1975, which was recorded by Al Chilsom, Gart Alexander and Sharon Brown in Los Angeles in 1976. Sharon Brown left LA and returned to the East Coast only to find years later her song "Family Tree" had become a huge underground hit. It was licensed once by Sharon Brown and OST Recording based in the UK to release "Family Tree" around the world, that, despite receiving club play in both the US and the UK, has never been officially received or in FM radio rotation. She had a hit single on the Billboard Hot Dance Club Play chart in 1982 with the song "I Specialize in Love", which was written by Lotti Golden and Richard Scher. This song spent three weeks at No. 2 on the Club Play chart and crossed over to R&B Dance Music Charts. It has been re-released in 1994 and in 2002, and again in 2011, her only solo song to reach this survey. "I Specialize in Love" was later covered by the group Exposé in the 1990s. Other songs recorded by Brown in the early to mid-1980s include "Love Don't Hurt People", "Programmed Heart" and "I'll Make You Feel Like the First Time".

In 2003, Brown appeared as the defendant in an episode of The People's Court. The plaintiff in the case was singer Carol Douglas, who had entered into an agreement with Brown that caused a dispute between the two singers. Judge Marilyn Milian asked both to sing briefly, with Brown delivering a snippet of "I Specialize in Love" and Douglas singing her 1974 disco song, "Doctor's Orders".

Brown resides in New York City, where she works to raise awareness about gang violence and spread positive messages through her writings and recordings. She is also active in prison ministry.

== Discography ==
=== Singles ===
Year	Single	Peak chart positions			
Year	Single	UK	US Dance	US R&B	NLD
1977	"Musick Sure Sounds Good" (Pt. 1 / Pt. 2)	—	—	—	—
1982	"I Specialize in Love"	38	2	51	21
1982	"Love Don't Hurt People"	—	—	—	—
1983	"You Got Me Where I Want to Be"	—	—	—	—
1985	"I Specialize in Love" (UK re-release)	91	—	—	—
1986	"I'll Make You Feel Like the First Time"	—	—	—	—
1994	"I Specialize in Love" (remix)	62	—	—	—
1995	"You Don't Want to Lose It (Deep in Your Soul)"	—	—	—	—
2002	"Family Tree" (with Family Tree)	—	—	—	—
"—" denotes releases that did not chart or were not released in that territory.
