= Peter Reckell =

American actor and musician (born 1955)

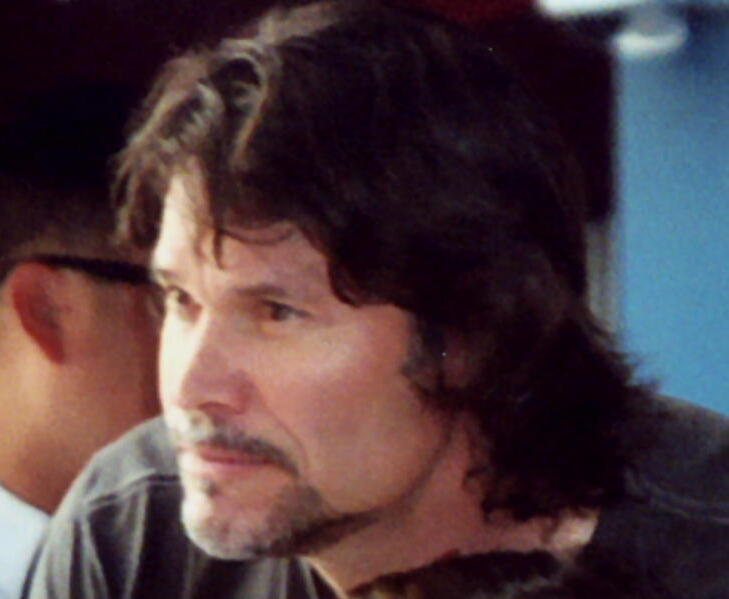
- Peter Reckell in 2004
- Born: Peter Paul Reckell; May 7, 1955 (age 71); Elkhart, Indiana, U.S.
- Education: Boston Conservatory at Berklee (BFA)
- Occupations: Actor; musician
- Years active: 1979–present
- Spouse(s): Dale Kristien (m. 1987; div. 1991) Kelly Moneymaker (m. 1998)
- Children: 1
- Website: peterpaulreckell.com

Peter Paul Reckell (born May 7, 1955) is an American actor and musician. He is best known for playing the role of Bo Brady on the NBC soap opera Days of Our Lives (1983 to 1987, 1990 to 1992, 1995 to 2012, recurring appearances from 2015 to 2023). He also played Bo on Days of Our Lives: Beyond Salem, a spinoff series streaming on Peacock (2022). Reckell was nominated for a Daytime Emmy Award for Outstanding Lead Actor in 2009 for his work on Days. His other roles include Eric Hollister on As the World Turns (1980 to 1982) and Johnny Rourke on Knots Landing (1988 to 1989). He released his debut album, Peter Reckell, in 2003.

== Early life ==
Reckell was born in Elkhart, Indiana, and raised in Okemos, a community in Lansing, Michigan. The second oldest of six children, he has two brothers and three sisters. While in junior high school, he worked behind the scenes in school theater productions and eventually began performing on stage. After graduation, Reckell attended the Boston Conservatory at Berklee, where he received a Bachelor of Fine Arts degree in theater with a minor in music and dance. He paid for his college education by working as a singing waiter. He graduated in 1977.

== Career ==
=== 1977-1982: Before Days ===
Reckell's early credits include stage productions of Oklahoma!, West Side Story, and Moonchildren. Reckell played The Mute in the Off Broadway production of The Fantasticks at New York's Sullivan Street Playhouse.

He was cast as Eric Hollister on the CBS soap opera As the World Turns, first airing on March 19, 1980. The character was paired with Hayley Wilson (Dana Delany). Reckell played the role until February 1982. He also made a guest appearance on The Facts of Life in 1982.

=== 1983-1987: Days of Our Lives ===
Reckell was cast as Bo Brady on the NBC soap opera Days of Our Lives, first airing on May 3, 1983. The character was paired with Hope Williams (played by Kristian Alfonso). Soap Opera Digest described the romantic storyline as "classic in its origins and continues to make people melt: gruff boy from the wrong side of the tracks...tames the spoiled rich girl who was getting into all sorts of trouble."

Reckell won two Soap Opera Digest Awards for Outstanding Lead Actor for his work on Days, in 1984 and 1985. In 1986, he won a Soap Opera Digest Award for Outstanding Young Leading Actor. He also received a nomination, with Kristian Alfonso, for Favorite Daytime Super Couple.

Reckell and Alfonso decided to leave Days of Our Lives, last airing April 20, 1987. He said that he was burned out from the show's schedule and needed to try something new. The characters of Bo and Hope left Salem to sail around the world with their son, Shawn.

=== 1988-1989: After Days ===
During time off from Days, he starred in the musical Jesus Christ Superstar at the Melody Top Theatre in Milwaukee. He also starred in productions of The Pirates of Penzance (playing The Pirate King) and Carousel (playing Billy Bigelow).

After leaving Days, Reckell starred in the play Deathtrap at Burt Reynolds Jupiter Theatre. He also appeared in a production of the musical Seven Brides for Seven Brothers in Sacramento. He played Tommy Rivers in the television film Shades of Love: Moonlight Flight. Reckell joined the cast of the CBS series Knots Landing, playing Johnny Rourke from 1988 to 1989.

=== 1990-1996: Days return ===
Reckell returned to Days of Our Lives, first airing April 19, 1990. He signed a long-term contract with the show. He played Danny in the television film Locked Up: A Mother's Rage (1991). In June 1991, Reckell appeared as Andrew in the play Love Letters at the Los Angeles Theatre Center.

Reckell decided to leave Days of Our Lives again, last airing January 17, 1992. He said that he had been dissatisfied with his storyline since returning to the show. The role of Bo was recast with Robert Kelker-Kelly.

In August 1992, Reckell starred as Benny in the play Misconduct Allowed at the Tiffany Theater in Los Angeles. He was cast as Jeff in the film Broken Bridges, which was shot in Moscow and Azerbaijan. The film's release was delayed until 1999.

In July 1993, he starred in the play Allocating Annie at Conklin's Star Dinner Theater in Illinois. He also guest starred on Baywatch in 1993. Reckell played Ben in the television film Heavenly Road (1994). He guest starred on Women of the House in 1995.

Reckell returned to Days of Our Lives as Bo Brady, first airing August 1, 1995. He signed a long-term contract with the show. Rumors circulated that he was asked to return because his replacement, Robert Kelker-Kelly, had been difficult to work with. Reckell won a Soap Opera Digest Award for Hottest Male Star in 1996. He also guest starred on Hope & Gloria in 1996.

=== 2000-2009: Other work ===
In 2000, Reckell played Bo Brady in the television film Days of Our Lives' 35th Anniversary. In 2001, he and Kristian Alfonso won a Soap Opera Digest Award for Favorite Couple. He also guest starred on Sheena in 2001.

In 2002, Reckell and Kristian Alfonso won a special Daytime Emmy Award, voted on by fans, for America's Favorite Couple. He released his debut album, Peter Reckell, in 2003. The album was produced by his wife, Kelly Moneymaker, and released on the independent label Midnite Sun Records. In 2005, Reckell and Alfonso were nominated for a special Daytime Emmy Award, voted on by fans, for Most Irresistible Combination.

In 2009, Reckell and Alfonso guest starred as their Days characters, Bo and Hope, on an episode of 30 Rock. He played Dan Reynolds in the film Street Dreams. On May 14, 2009, twenty-six years after his debut on Days of Our Lives, Reckell was nominated for his first Daytime Emmy Award for Outstanding Lead Actor in a Drama Series.

=== 2010-present ===
In June 2010, Reckell joined the cast of the web series Venice: The Series. In June 2012, it was announced that he would be leaving Days of Our Lives. His exit was rumored to be caused by budget cuts. He last aired in October 2012. In March 2015, it was announced that he would return to Days for the show's 50th anniversary. The character of Bo died from a brain tumor. On June 8, 2016, Reckell returned as Bo's ghost for a special episode of Days of Our Lives, focused on Hope Williams Brady.

In September 2016, he played El Gallo in The Fantasticks at New York's Jerry Orbach Theater. In 2020, he starred in Permanent Resident, a short film set during the COVID-19 pandemic.

Reckell made a brief return to Days of Our Lives as Bo's ghost in May 2022. He played Bo on Days of Our Lives: Beyond Salem, a spin off series streaming on Peacock in July 2022. It was revealed that the character was still alive after having been cryogenically frozen. Reckell made a short return to Days in 2023, along with his former co-stars Kristian Alfonso and Victoria Konefal.

== Personal life ==
In December 1987, Reckell married actress Dale Kristien, who is best known for playing Christine in Broadway's The Phantom of the Opera. They divorced in 1991.

He married Kelly Moneymaker, the former singer of Exposé, on April 18, 1998. Their daughter was born on October 25, 2007.

Reckell is an environmentalist. He lives in a solar powered home and drives an electric car. He also sometimes uses a bicycle for transportation.

He won the 2003 Toyota Pro/Celebrity Grand Prix of Long Beach, California.

== Filmography ==
=== Film ===
Year	Title	Role	Notes
1999	Broken Bridges	Jeff	
2009	Street Dreams	Dan Reynolds	
2020	Permanent Resident		Short film

=== Television ===
Year	Title	Role	Notes
1980–1982	As the World Turns	Eric Hollister	Contract role
1982	The Facts of Life	Alan Cooke	Episode: "The Affair"
1983–1987; 1990–1992; 1995–2012; 2015–2016; 2022; 2023	Days of Our Lives	Bo Brady	Contract role; Recurring role (2016, 2022, 2023)
1985	Circus of the Stars	Himself	Episode 10
1985	Bob Hope's Comedy Salute to the Soaps	Himself	
1987	The Law & Harry McGraw	Lawrence Packard	Episode: "State of the Art"
1988	Shades of Love: Moonlight Flight	Tommy Rivers	Television film
1988–1989	Knots Landing	Johnny Rourke	31 episodes
1991	Locked Up: A Mother's Rage	Danny	Television film
1992	Days of our Lives: One Stormy Night	Bo Brady	Television film
1993	Baywatch	Jordan Stewart	Episode: "Tentacles: Part 2"
1994	Heavenly Road	Ben	Television film
1995	Women of the House	Steve Briston	Episode: "North to Alaska"
1996	Hope & Gloria	Peter Reckell (Bo Brady)	Episode: "A New York Story"
2000	Days of our Lives' 35th Anniversary	Bo Brady	Television film
2001	Sheena	Cody	Episode: "Rendezvous"
2004	1 Day With	Himself	1 episode
2009	30 Rock	Bo Brady	Episode: "Dealbreakers Talk Show No. 0001"
2022	Days of Our Lives: Beyond Salem	Bo Brady	TV miniseries 5 episodes

=== Web series ===
Year	Title	Role	Notes
2010–2012	Venice: The Series	Richard	24 episodes
2013	The Grove: The Series	Johnny Chava	

== Awards and nominations ==
Year	Award	Category	Title	Result	Ref.
1984	Soap Opera Digest Award	Outstanding Lead Actor in a Daytime Soap Opera	Days of Our Lives	Won	
1985	Soap Opera Digest Award	Outstanding Lead Actor in a Daytime Soap Opera	Days of Our Lives	Won	
1986	Soap Opera Digest Award	Favorite Daytime Super Couple (shared with Kristian Alfonso)	Days of Our Lives	Nominated	
1986	Soap Opera Digest Award	Outstanding Young Leading Actor	Days of Our Lives	Won	
1996	Soap Opera Digest Award	Hottest Male Star	Days of Our Lives	Won	
2001	Soap Opera Digest Award	Favorite Couple (shared with Kristian Alfonso)	Days of Our Lives	Won	
2002	Daytime Emmy Award	America's Favorite Couple (voted on by fans, shared with Kristian Alfonso)	Days of Our Lives	Won	
2005	Daytime Emmy Award	Most Irresistible Combination (voted on by fans, shared with Kristian Alfonso)	Days of Our Lives	Nominated	
2009	Daytime Emmy Award	Outstanding Lead Actor in a Drama Series	Days of Our Lives	Nominated	

== Discography ==
=== Album ===
- Peter Reckell (2003)

=== Other appearances ===
- "When Two Chevys Collide" on Days of Our Lives: Love Songs (2007)

== See also ==
- Days of Our Lives
- Bo Brady and Hope Williams
- Supercouple
