= What You Don't Know (Exposé album) =

1989 studio album by Exposé

Studio album by Exposé
- Released: June 13, 1989
- Recorded: August 1988 – April 1989
- Studio: Countdown Recording (Miami)
- Genres: Freestyle; dance
- Length: 49:26 (cassette); 62:10 (CD)
- Label: Arista
- Producer: Lewis A. Martineé

Exposé chronology
Exposure (1987)	What You Don't Know (1989)	Exposé (1992)

Singles from What You Don't Know
- 1. "What You Don't Know" Released: May 20, 1989; 2. "When I Looked at Him" Released: August 19, 1989; 3. "Tell Me Why" Released: December 9, 1989; 4. "Your Baby Never Looked Good in Blue" Released: March 31, 1990; 5. "Stop, Listen, Look & Think" Released: July 7, 1990

Professional ratings
Review scores
Source	Rating
AllMusic	4.5/5 stars
The Rolling Stone Album Guide	2.5/5 stars

What You Don't Know is the second studio album by American girl group Exposé, released on June 13, 1989, by Arista Records. It was made available in vinyl, cassette, and CD formats. The remixes of the tracks "What You Don't Know" and "When I Looked at Him" appeared only on the CD. Comparing to their previous album, which mainly features Jeanette Jurado on lead vocals, this second album focuses more on Gioia Bruno, who sang lead on 6 of 11 songs.

In 2017, 3CD-Expanded edition was released by Cherry Pop Records. In this edition, various remixes and a previously unreleased track "You Got Me Running" (lead vocals by Ann Curless) are included.

== Track listing ==
All tracks are written by Lewis A. Martineé, except where noted.

Side one
No.	Title	Length
1.	"What You Don't Know"	4:46
2.	"Stop, Listen, Look & Think"	4:08
3.	"Tell Me Why"	5:23
4.	"When I Looked at Him"	5:32
5.	"Let Me Down Easy"	4:43

Side two
No.	Title	Writer(s)	Length
6.	"Still Hung Up on You"	B. Steinberg, T. Kelly	3:56
7.	"Your Baby Never Looked Good in Blue"	D. Warren	3:54
8.	"Now That I Found You"	L.A. Martineé, J. Martin	3:46
9.	"Love Don't Hurt (Until You Fall)"	L.A. Martineé, L. Shameea, F.J. Diaz	4:21
10.	"Didn't It Hurt to Hurt Me"		5:39
11.	"Walk Along with Me"		3:05

CD edition bonus tracks
No.	Title	Length
12.	"What You Don't Know" (In Effect Mix)	5:45
13.	"When I Looked at Him" (Suave Mix)	7:01
14.	"What You Don't Know" (Paradise Version) (Japanese edition only)	4:11

== Personnel ==
=== Exposé ===
- Gioia Bruno: Lead vocals on tracks 1, 3, 5, 9 and 10; co-lead with Ann and Jeanette on track 11, backing vocals
- Ann Curless: Lead vocals on tracks 2 and 8; co-lead with Gioia and Jeanette on track 11, backing vocals
- Jeanette Jurado: Lead vocals on tracks 4, 6 and 7; co-lead with Ann and Gioia on track 11, backing vocals

=== Additional Personnel ===
- Davonda Simmons, Wendy Pedersen: Backing vocals
- Mike Bakst, Jay Martin, Frolian "Fro" Sosa: Keyboards
- Nestor Gomez: Electric Guitars
- Jorge Finess: Acoustic Guitars
- Bobby Pruitt: Bass, Backing Vocals
- Julio Hernandez: Bass
- Bradley Russell: Fretless Bass
- Orlando Hernandez: Drums, Percussion
- Lewis A. Martineé: Keyboards, Bass, Drums, Percussion, Backing Vocals
- Ed Calle, Bobby Martinez: Saxophone
- Dana Teboe: Trombone
- Kenneth Faulk, Tony Concepcion: Trumpets

== Charts ==
=== Weekly charts ===
Weekly chart performance for What You Don’t Know
Chart (1989)	Peak position
Australian Albums (ARIA)	117
Canada Top Albums/CDs (RPM)	66
Japanese Albums (Oricon)	62
US Billboard 200	33
US Top R&B/Hip-Hop Albums (Billboard)	94

=== Year-end charts ===
Year-end chart performance for What You Don’t Know
Chart (1989)	Position
US Billboard 200	100

== Certifications ==
Certifications for What You Don't Know
Region	Certification	Certified units/sales
United States (RIAA)	Gold	500,000^{^}
^{^} Shipments figures based on certification alone.
