= Seasons Change (song) =

1987 single by Exposé

Single by Exposé

from the album Exposure
- B-side: "December"
- Released: November 1987
- Recorded: October 1986 – January 1987
- Genre: Synth-pop; R&B; freestyle
- Length: 3:58 (single version); 4:55 (album version)
- Label: Arista
- Songwriter: Lewis Martineé
- Producer: Lewis Martineé

Exposé singles chronology
"Let Me Be the One" (1987)	"Seasons Change" (1987)	"What You Don't Know" (1989)

Audio sample
- file; help

"Seasons Change" is a pop–R&B song written and produced by Lewis Martineé for the American girl group Exposé's debut album, Exposure (1987). It was the group's fifth single released. In a Songfacts interview with Martineé, he explained: "'Seasons Change' is about growing old with someone, spending your life with someone. 'Seasons change, I'll sacrifice tomorrow to have you here today.' It's about being with that person forever. That was one of my favorite songs that I've ever written." It is the group's biggest hit to date. Angie Vollaro of fellow Lewis A. Martineé group Sequal lent background vocals to this song; Steve Grove on saxophone.

== Reception ==
Released at the end of 1987 as the album's fifth single, the ballad remains the group's biggest hit to date, as it went to number one on the Adult Contemporary chart and topped the U.S. Billboard Hot 100 for one week on February 20, 1988. The single reached number 97 in the United Kingdom, and number 13 in Canada.

== Track listings ==
No.	Title	Length
1.	"Seasons Change" (Extended Remix)	7:45
2.	"Seasons Change" (Crossover Mix)	5:20
3.	"Seasons Change" (Single Version)	3:58
4.	"Megamix: "Point of No Return"; "Come Go with Me"; "Exposed to Love"	10:00

== Charts ==
=== Weekly charts ===
Weekly chart performance for "Seasons Change"
Chart (1988)	Peak position
Canada (The Record)	13
Canada Adult Contemporary (RPM)	1
Italy Airplay (Music & Media)	10
New Zealand (Recorded Music NZ)	36
Panama (UPI)	7
UK Singles (Official Charts)	97
US Billboard Hot 100	1
US Adult Contemporary (Billboard)	1
US Dance Singles Sales (Billboard)	32
US Hot R&B/Hip-Hop Songs (Billboard)	27
US Cash Box Top 100 Singles	4
US Top Black Contemporary Singles (Cash Box)	34

=== Year-end charts ===
Year-end chart performance for "Seasons Change"
Chart (1988)	Position
US Billboard Hot 100	16
US Adult Contemporary (Billboard)	24
US Cash Box Top 100 Singles	21
