= Exposed to Love =

Single by Exposé

from the album Exposure
- Released: December 1985
- Recorded: 1985
- Genre: Freestyle; dance-pop; dance-rock
- Length: 3:35
- Label: Arista
- Songwriter(s): Lewis A. Martineé
- Producer(s): Lewis A. Martineé

Exposé singles chronology
"Point of No Return" (1985)	"Exposed to Love" (1985)	"Come Go with Me" (1987)

"Exposed to Love" is a dance single by the female dance-pop trio Exposé. Released in December 1985, it was the original group's second single after "Point of No Return," with Alé Lorenzo singing lead vocals. "Exposed to Love" features vocals from the original group's lineup and is featured in this form on the album Exposure. Ann Curless, Gioia Bruno, and Jeanette Jurado, the group's current members, share the lead vocals during live performances.

== Reception ==
The single charted on the U.S. Billboard Hot Dance Singles Sales and Hot Dance Club Play charts at #19 and #12, respectively. Billboard named the song #69 on their list of 100 Greatest Girl Group Songs of All Time.

== Track listing ==
Produced and Arranged by Lewis A. Martineé for Pantera Productions.

US 7" single

No.	Title	Length
1.	"Exposed to Love"	3:20
2.	"Exposed to Love" (Instrumental)	3:20

US 12" single

No.	Title	Length
1.	"Exposed to Love"	6:10
2.	"Exposed to Love" (Dub Mix)	6:40

== Personnel ==
- Sandra "Sandeé" Casañas – Vocals
- Alejandra "Alé" Lorenzo – Vocals
- Laurie Miller – Vocals
- George "Jet" Finess – Lead guitar
- Nestor Gomez – Lead and rhythm guitars
- Steve Grove – Saxophone
- Lewis A. Martineé – Keyboards, percussion and drum programming
- Fro Sosa – Synth solos and keyboards
- Mike Couzzi – Recording engineer
- Lewis A. Martineé and Chris Lord-Alge – Mixing

== Charts ==
Chart performance for "Exposed to Love"
Chart (1986)	Peak position
US Dance Club Songs (Billboard)	12
US Dance Singles Sales (Billboard)	19
