= Kelly Moneymaker =

American singer

Kelly Susan Moneymaker (born June 4, 1969) is an American singer, songwriter, producer, and documentary film director.

== Early career ==
She was born and raised in Fairbanks, Alaska. As a teenager, Moneymaker moved to Seattle to co-found the band BoyToy with Michele Rundgren (formerly Michele Gray), which led to opening for The Tubes on their Love Bomb Tour. A few years later, she moved to California and worked with Todd Rundgren, Wayne Newton, Connie Stevens, Enya, Meat Loaf, Ringo Starr, Diana Ross and many more.

== Exposé ==
Moneymaker was invited to join Exposé (recently named one of Billboard Magazine's Top 10 Girl-Groups) by Jeanette Jurado after being introduced to her by a mutual friend, precipitated by Gioia Bruno's departure due to a medical condition. Moneymaker performed on the Exposé LP, which launched the hits "I Wish the Phone Would Ring," "I'll Never Get over You (Getting over Me)," "In Walked Love," and "As Long As I Can Dream," as well as the new tracks for their Greatest Hits album, one of which was "End of the World," featured on the Free Willy 2 soundtrack.

In 1996, when Arista Records dropped Exposé's contract, Moneymaker pursued solo projects. However, she is still an honorary member of the group, and appears with them on special occasions.

== Post-Exposé career ==
Moneymaker has released several independent albums: Stone LP (2015); Race against the Sky (2013); Back Seat Taxi by Back Seat Taxi; Goddess Killer by Silvermoney (2009 with co-founder Dan Silver); Like a Blackbird (1996), and Through the Basement Walls, (2003) from which "Angels in the Snow" broke a record in Billboard Single Sales as an independent release. "Can't Live without Your Love" reached #1 on the New Music Weekly AC40 singles chart, and became the theme song for NBC's Days of Our Lives' "supercouple" Bo and Hope. That song's success resulted in her co-writing and co-producing the Love Songs LP for Days of Our Lives; she was a featured artist on the album, and has made appearances on the show as herself. Kelly has also released holiday singles for charity, including "You Are a Snowball," "Jingle Bells," and "No Place Like Home for the Holidays," featuring Sean Holt on saxophone.

The original music Kelly writes, performs, and produces has been featured on TV shows such as CSI, Without a Trace, Gossip Girl, Hawaii 5-0, Parenthood, and others. Movies to which she has contributed include Warrior, American Pie: The Naked Mile, Get Smart's Bruce and Lloyd: Out of Control, Confessions of a Go-Go Girl, and others. She also contributed to the video game Guitar Hero.

Kelly's all-star band In the Black includes Tower of Power drummer Herman Matthews, guitarist Gabriel Moses (Macy Gray), and bassist Michael Mennell (Tom Jones). Guest musicians on her latest album Stone include Tower of Power Horns performer/arranger Bill Churchville, saxophonist Sean Holt (Bruno Mars), keyboardist Scott Sheriff (Carrie Underwood), Michael Webb (Poco), and guitarist Kenny Vaughan (Lana Del Rey). Guest vocalists include Robbie Wyckoff (Roger Waters), Will Wheaton (Michael Jackson), and Michael Mishaw (Don Henley). Choir includes Bernadette Barlow (Melissa Etheridge), Gia Cambiotti (Lucinda Williams), Lynn Fanelli (Delaney Bramlett), Adam "Ae'jaye Jackson (Anita Whitaker), Connie Jackson (Joe Walsh), K.W. Miller (Wicked), Janelle Sadler (Natalie Cole), and Marina V.

== Personal life ==
Moneymaker was once married to Stuart Mathis, who worked on sound production during the 1993 Exposé tour. Since 1998, she has been married to actor Peter Reckell, who starred as Bo Brady on Days of Our Lives. In 2007 she gave birth to their daughter, Loden Sloan.
