= Exposé (group) =

American freestyle vocal group

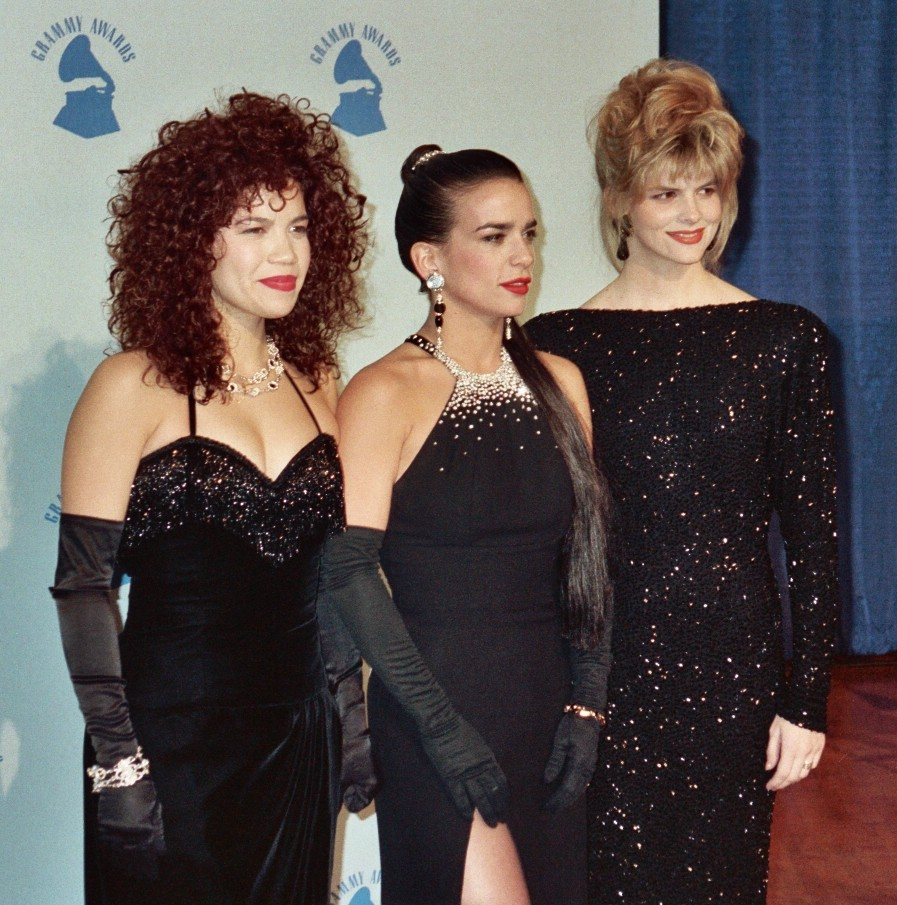
- Exposé at the 32nd Annual Grammy Awards in February 1990 (from left to right: Jeanette Jurado, Gioia Bruno, and Ann Curless)

Background information
- Origin: Miami, Florida, U.S.
- Genres: Latin freestyle; dance; pop
- Years active: 1984–1996; 2003; 2006–present
- Labels: Arista; BMG; Walking Distance Entertainmentz
- Members: Gioia Bruno; Ann Curless; Jeanette Jurado; Kelly Moneymaker
- Past members: Sandra "Sandeé" Casañas (1984–1986); Alejandra "Alé" Lorenzo (1984–1986); Laurie Miller (1984–1986)
- Website: www.exposeonline.net

Exposé is an American freestyle vocal group originally formed in 1984 in Miami, Florida. The group has primarily consisted of lead vocalists Jeanette Jurado, Ann Curless, and Gioia Bruno. The group achieved much of its success between 1984 and 1993, becoming the first group to attain four top 10 entries on the Billboard Hot 100 from a debut album, including the 1988 number one single "Seasons Change." Exposé’s seven consecutive Top 10 hits on the US Hot 100 landed them behind only The Supremes (with nine consecutive Top 10 hits) for most Top 10 hits by an all-female group. In March 2015, Billboard magazine named the group the eighth most successful girl group of all time.

The group was popular in dance clubs and the mainstream Top 40, as well as adult contemporary charts in the United States. They toured and recorded music from 1984 to 1995, then retired from recording and public performances until 2003.

== History ==
=== Formation and original members (1984–1986) ===
Exposé was formed in 1984 by Miami disc jockey and producer Lewis Martineé. Working with his partners Ismael Garcia and Frank Diaz at Pantera Productions, talent scouts hired Sandra "Sandeé" Casañas, Alejandra "Alé" Lorenzo, and Laurie Miller as the group's original lineup, under the name X-Posed, which later became Exposé. That year, the trio recorded "Point of No Return" for Pantera Records. In 1985, Exposé signed with Arista Records, which re-released the song as a 12-inch vinyl single. It became a #1 hit on the Billboard Hot Dance Club Play chart. The song helped popularize a genre of music that became known as freestyle. Later that year, Exposé recorded and released their second single titled, "Exposed to Love." Following the success, Arista approved a full-length album from the group.

=== Lineup change and Exposure (1986–1988) ===
During the recording of their first studio album Exposure, the group's lineup changed. Accounts differ as to how these lineup changes came to be. While Martineé stated that he decided to replace the three band members, Miller maintains that each member quit by choice. Casañas and Miller went on to pursue solo careers, while Lorenzo pursued other ambitions. The new lineup was Jeanette Jurado, Gioia Bruno, and Ann Curless.

In 1987, Exposé released Exposure on Arista Records, led by the pop/dance hit "Come Go with Me," which reached #5 on the US Billboard Hot 100 chart. A re-recorded version of "Point of No Return" sung by Jurado was released, and peaked at #5 on the US Hot 100. While the initial distribution of Exposure to suppliers contained the original 1984 version of the song, subsequent pressings contained the new version. "Let Me Be the One," a mid-tempo R&B song, reached #7 on the US Hot 100. The group's highest-charting hit came in 1988 with the #1 US hit ballad "Seasons Change".

The band received a Soul Train Award nomination for Best New Artist; made television appearances on American Bandstand, Solid Gold, Showtime at the Apollo, and The Late Show Starring Joan Rivers; and performed as an opening act on the national tour for Lisa Lisa and Cult Jam. Exposé additionally provided backing vocals on Kashif's album Love Changes.

During this time, the group dealt with legal issues. Group members filed a lawsuit and ultimately settled the case for a renegotiated contract.

=== What You Don't Know (1989–1990) ===
The group's second album, What You Don't Know (1989), was certified gold in the US with sales of over 500,000 copies. The album's first single, "What You Don't Know," peaked at #8. The second single "When I Looked at Him" rose to #10 on the US Hot 100. The next single "Tell Me Why" (#9) gave Exposé seven consecutive Top 10 hits on the US Hot 100. "Tell Me Why" addressed youth in street gangs and rewarded the group with additional praise for its socially conscious lyrics. "Your Baby Never Looked Good in Blue" (#9 U.S. Adult Contemporary / #17 Pop) followed soon afterwards. "Stop, Listen, Look & Think" was released promotionally and also included in the film The Forbidden Dance (1990). Exposé also completed its first tour as headliner and appeared on Soul Train, The Pat Sajak Show, The Byron Allen Show, and the 1989 broadcast of Dick Clark's New Year's Rockin' Eve.

In 1990, while touring with Exposé, Bruno began having throat problems, which was later linked to a benign tumor on her vocal cords. Ultimately, Bruno could not sing for several years and was replaced by Kelly Moneymaker in 1992.

=== Exposé (1991–1996) ===
After Moneymaker joined Exposé, the group released its self-titled third album Exposé, which integrated more mature material into the group's established freestyle, house, R&B, pop, and love-ballad repertoire. Clive Davis took over as executive producer and Martineé contributed to its production.

The third album was not as commercially successful as their previous two, but still achieved gold status. Several singles fared well on the adult-contemporary charts. The group landed on the U.S. Top 40 pop chart with "I Wish the Phone Would Ring" and "I'll Never Get Over You Getting Over Me", which also reached #1 on the adult contemporary chart. The group appeared on Live with Regis and Kathie Lee, The Tonight Show with Jay Leno, The Les Brown Show, and the Brazilian children's show Xuxa.

In 1995, Exposé recorded the Diane Warren-penned song "I'll Say Good-Bye for the Two of Us," which appeared on the soundtrack of the film Free Willy 2: The Adventure Home; that same year, the song was included in their Greatest Hits.

=== Label inactivity and solo projects (1996–2003) ===
Toward the end of 1995, Arista dropped the group, and the members disbanded in 1996 to pursue other projects. In the years that followed, two greatest hits compilations and a collection of remixes were released.

After the group broke up, Jurado performed in the stage play Mad Hattan and supplied vocals for contemporary jazz guitarist Nils Lofgren and Safe Sax. Moneymaker married soap opera actor Peter Reckell and released four solo albums. Moneymaker also wrote and produced the "Love Songs" LP for NBC's Days of Our Lives and had original songs placed in over 25 film, TV, and game productions including "Guitar Hero", "Hawaii 5-0", "CSI", and others. Curless worked in songwriting, supplied vocals to several club-dance projects, and also taught music and music business. Eventually, both Jurado and Curless married, had children and temporarily retired from performing.

In 1997, Bruno fully recovered from her throat tumor and returned to singing. After a small stint with the band Wet, she worked on a solo career focused mostly on dance-oriented material. Her first album, Expose This, was released in 2004.

=== Reformation (2003–present) ===
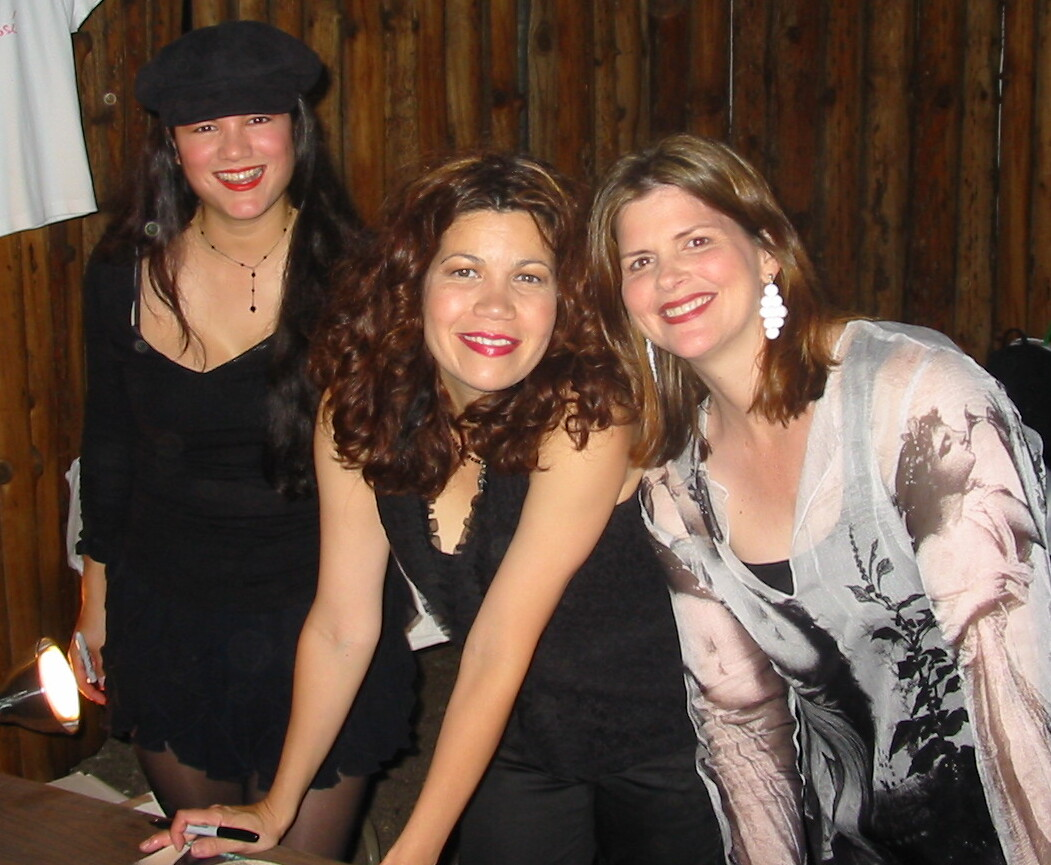
Moneymaker, Jurado and Curless during an autograph session after the first show at the Mid State Fair (Paso Robles, California) in 2003

After a long hiatus, in 2003 Curless, Jurado, and Moneymaker reunited briefly for a reunion concert at the Mid State Fair in Paso Robles, California.

In 2006, Jurado announced that the group had signed with a major booking agency. Around the same time, Bruno announced that she was back with Exposé for the first time in 15 years. Moneymaker remains an honorary member of the group.

Later in 2006, Exposé kicked off a tour at the American Airlines Arena in Miami for the Freestyle Explosion concert, with the lineup of Curless, Jurado, and Bruno. At the Potawatomi Bingo Casino Northern Lights Theater in Milwaukee, Exposé performed with a full band led by Steve Fansler, their first full concert together with Bruno since 1990.

Exposé recorded a 2011 version of their hit "Point of No Return" working with dance producer Giuseppe D. and Chris Cox, which was released that year. The group released a single for Christmas called "I Believe in Christmas (Like It Used to Be)" in 2011, co-written by Adam Gorgoni, Jeanette Jurado, and Shelly Peiken. Proceeds of the single went to the Wounded Warrior Project. In 2012, the group independently released the single "Shine on," co-written by Ann Curless, who also sings lead vocals on the track.

In 2015, Cherry Pop Records reissued the group's debut album. Consisting of two discs, the expanded reissue came with an extensive booklet and remixes.

== Trademark lawsuit ==
In 2007, Jurado, Bruno, Curless, Moneymaker, Paradise Artists, and Walking Distance Entertainment were named as defendants in a lawsuit by Crystal Entertainment & Filmworks (I & II). At issue was the trademark licensing agreement for the rights to use the name Exposé. The first case was dismissed without prejudice. The second went to trial.

During the process, both Paradise Artists and Moneymaker were dismissed as defendants, and a countersuit was filed against the plaintiffs. In 2009, the court ruled in favor of the defendants on most counts, finding them only guilty of a contractual breach with the plaintiffs. The court also ruled that the defendants showed common-law proof of ownership and the "[consumer] goodwill associated with Exposé was with the members." The court awarded Jurado, Bruno, and Curless exclusive rights to the name Exposé as a trademark.

Exposé mentioned this victory and performed for the first time with Moneymaker as a guest at the Los Angeles Pride Festival in June 2009, making it the first time all four core members, Jurado, Bruno, Curless, and Moneymaker, appeared on stage together.

== Discography ==
- Exposure (1987)
- What You Don't Know (1989)
- Exposé (1992)
