= Point of No Return (Exposé song) =

Single by Exposé

from the album Exposure
- Released: March 11, 1985; April 1987 (re-recording)
- Recorded: December 1984 – February 1985; January 1987 (re-recorded)
- Genre: Freestyle
- Length: 5:40 (single version); 3:26 (1987 single version); 6:40 (dub version); 6:07 (album version)
- Label: Arista, Pantera
- Songwriter: Lewis Martineé
- Producer: Lewis Martineé

Exposé singles chronology
"Point of No Return" (1985)	"Exposed to Love" (1985)

"Point of No Return" is a single by the American pop group Exposé. Written and produced by Lewis Martineé, the single was originally released in 1984 on the Pantera label with Alejandra Lorenzo (Alé) as the lead singer. The single was re-recorded in 1987 with Jeanette Jurado as the lead vocalist and included on the group's debut album, Exposure (1987), when it was finally released on compact disc in 1989.

== Background ==
"It's just a little song about loving somebody to the point of no return", said songwriter Lewis Martineé when asked if there was a deeper meaning to the song. "I just liked the title 'Point Of No Return', so I decided to write a song around that. Then I started coming up with the beats and the synthesizer lines and then both melody and words. I wrote that song so fast it was crazy, like, literally 15 minutes. But then I didn't like the bridge and I changed it. I'm glad I did because the bridge actually came out really good at the end."

== Reception ==
The original vocal mix of the song, featuring Lorenzo, reached the top of the Billboard Hot Dance Club Play chart in spring 1985. The re-recorded vocal version with Jurado reached #5 on the Billboard Hot 100 chart in July 1987.

== Music video ==
The music video for "Point of No Return" features Exposé performing in front of an energetic audience. As of December 2022, it has been well-received on YouTube, with the release featuring over 14 million views.

== Track listings ==
United States 12" single – 1984 edition

No.	Title	Length
1.	"Point of No Return"	6:55
2.	"Dub of No Return"	8:00

United States 12" single – 1985 edition

No.	Title	Length
1.	"Point of No Return"	6:08
2.	"Dub of No Return"	6:40

United States 7" single – 1987 edition

No.	Title	Length
1.	"Point of No Return"	3:26
2.	"Extra Extra"	3:44

United States 12" single – 1987 edition

No.	Title	Length
1.	"Point of No Return" (Extended Mix)	9:38
2.	"Point of No Return" (Crossover Mix)	5:45
3.	"Dub of No Return" (Strikes Again)	6:30

== Charts ==
=== Weekly charts ===
1985 weekly chart performance for "Point of No Return"
Chart (1985)	Peak position
US Dance Club Songs (Billboard)	1
US Dance Singles Sales (Billboard)	19

1987 weekly chart performance for "Point of No Return"
Chart (1987)	Peak position
Canada Top Singles (RPM)	22
UK Singles (Official Charts)	83
US Billboard Hot 100	5
US Dance Singles Sales (Billboard)	40
US Cash Box Top 100 Singles	7

=== Year-end charts ===
1985 year-end chart performance for "Point of No Return"
Chart (1985)	Position
US Dance Club Songs (Billboard)	28

1987 year-end chart performance for "Point of No Return"
Chart (1987)	Position
US Billboard Hot 100	80
US Cash Box Top 100 Singles	48

== See also ==
- List of number-one dance singles of 1985 (U.S.)
