= Jeanette Jurado =

- Jeanette singing at the Exposé reunion concert in 2007

Background information
- Born: Jeanette Livier Jurado
- Genres: Dance-pop, house, hi-NRG, dance, adult contemporary, freestyle
- Occupations: Vocalist, songwriter, actress
- Years active: 1986–present
- Label: Arista (1986–1996)
- Member of: Exposé

Jeanette Livier Jurado is a member and lead vocalist of the popular American girl group, Exposé, along with Ann Curless, Gioia Bruno and, in the group's later years, Kelly Moneymaker.

She provided lead vocals on many of the group's songs, including its three biggest hits, "Come Go with Me", "Point of No Return" and "Seasons Change". She has also performed in at least one film, My Family (Mi Familia). In addition, Jurado has performed in Las Vegas as a part of several bands and in the show MadHattan.

== Musical career ==
Jurado was active in Exposé from 1986 to 1996, when the group disbanded. Exposé was among the biggest stars of the late-1980s Latin freestyle boom. She sang lead on the group's biggest hits, including their #1 hit ballad "Seasons Change". The trio was the first group in music history to have four top-ten hits from their debut album, Exposure.

When a new version of the group Exposé was created in 1986 out of the band X-Posed, Jurado was brought in by Lewis A. Martinée as the new lead singer. At the time, she was singing for an R&B cover act that opened for the original version of Exposé.

After the group quickly began racking up hits early on and began touring, Jurado experienced homesickness and lethargy while touring Europe.

Jurado has been compared with fellow Latin freestyle group vocalist Lisa Velez of Lisa Lisa & Cult Jam. Jurado's voice is commanding while projecting an "almost-untrained innocence" described as giving an "appealingly raw and sentimental R&B delivery" to "Seasons Change" that helped to make it a radio hit.

== Personal life ==
Jurado was born in East Los Angeles, California before her family moved to Pico Rivera, California when she was a young child. She is of Mexican American descent and describes growing up in a vibrant, largely Latino neighborhood and community. She is the middle child of three sisters.

She is married with two children.

Jurado grew up with music throughout her life. She began singing when she was around 15 years old and cites Barbra Streisand and The Carpenters as influences.
