= Ann Curless =

American popular music singer

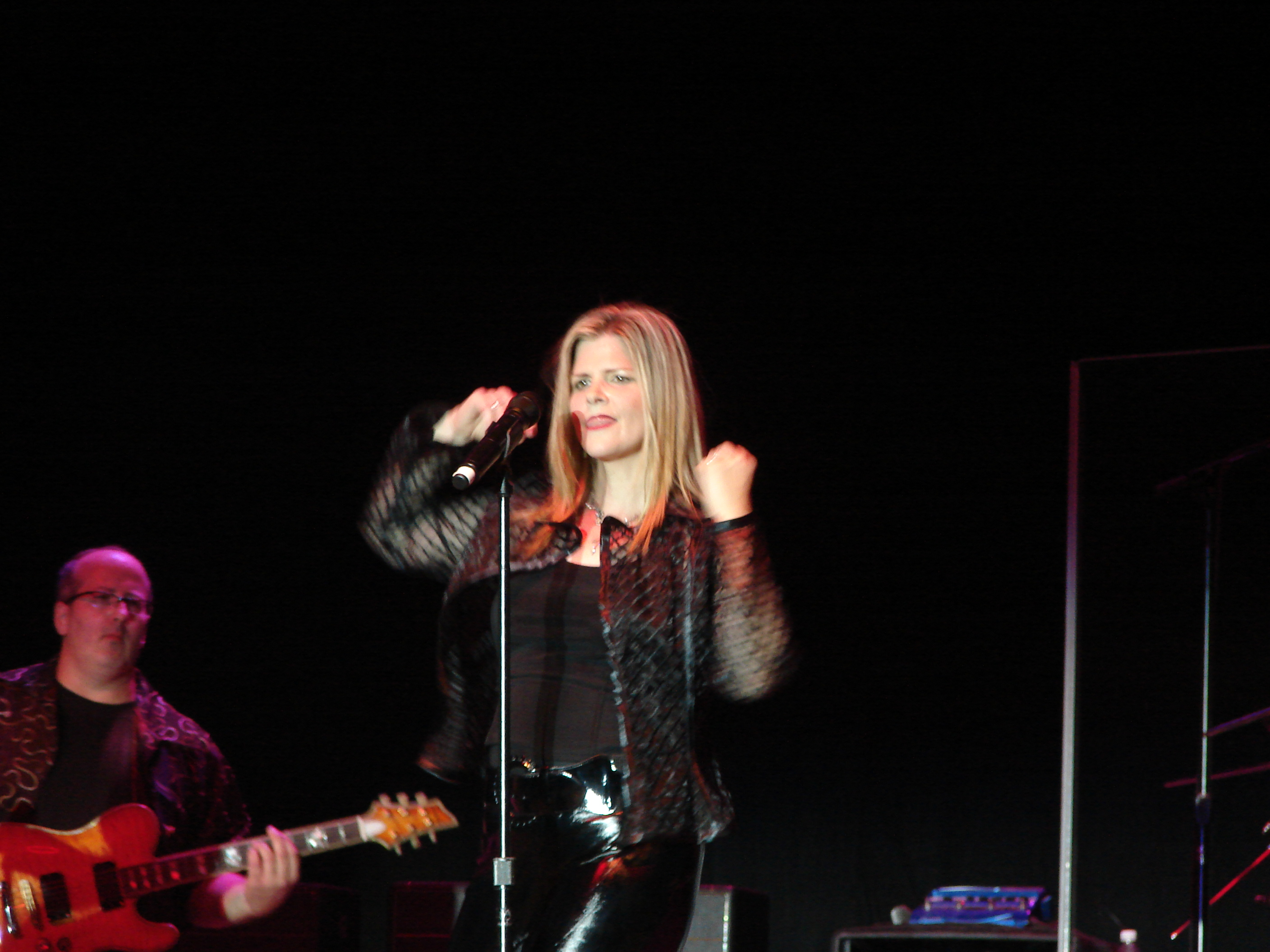
- Curless singing at the Exposé reunion concert in 2007

Background information
- Born: Ann Katherine Curless; October 7, 1963 (age 62); Albany, New York, U.S.
- Origin: Miami Beach, Florida, U.S.
- Genres: Dance-pop, House, Hi-NRG, Dance Music, freestyle, Adult Contemporary
- Occupations: Vocalist, songwriter
- Instruments: Vocals, keyboards, guitar
- Years active: 1986–present
- Label: Arista Records (1986-1996)
- Member of: Exposé

Ann Curless (born Ann Katherine Curless; October 7, 1963) is an American popular music singer, most notable as part of Exposé.

== Early life and education ==
Ann Curless was born on October 7, 1963 in Albany, New York. She was raised in Miami Beach, Florida and attended school there. During her years attending Miami Beach High School, she joined Doug Burris's Rock Ensemble, and was a member of this from 1979-82.

She enrolled in University of Miami Frost School of Music, majoring in both music and music merchandising. After graduating from the University of Miami, she started her music career in cover bands until she was asked to join Exposé in 1986. She was the last member to join the "Arista lineup", and was introduced to Jeanette Jurado and Gioia Bruno at a Mexican restaurant in Miami.

== Career ==
She was active in Exposé from 1986–1996, singing lead on the hit singles "Stop, Listen, Look and Think", "As Long as I Can Dream", and "In Walked Love". After Exposé released their greatest hits album, she kept a low profile and worked on various projects. Curless has appeared in a local South Florida production of the musical Chess, and has performed vocals on several dance-music projects; one called Clueless (miscredited as "Anne Curless"), another called the K&M Project for a remake of the Donna Summer song Heaven Knows, worked with producer JJ on the song Come to Me, and worked with producer Vinny Vero on a few tracks. She has also written for other artists, including Degrees of Motion, Celi Bee, and Angela Bofill in addition to working on a charity project called Songs of Love.

In 2006, Curless renewed connections with the other members of Exposé and is now touring with the group. Their first performance since 2003 was on October 21, 2006 as part of the "Freestyle Explosion" concert at the AmericanAirlines Arena in Miami, Florida.

== Personal life ==
Curless was formerly married to George Hess in the early 1990s, a former dance music executive at RCA/Arista Records. She has since remarried and has three children.
