= Lewis Martineé =

American producer, songwriter and disc jockey

Lewis A. Martineé (born Luis Antonio Martínez) is a producer, songwriter and disc jockey based in Miami, Florida. Martineé reached number one on the Billboard Pop charts as writer and producer of the song "Seasons Change" by Latin freestyle group Exposé and has had multiple records reach the top ten. Martineé received Billboard Songwriter of the Year as well as BMI Songwriter of the Year. In addition to founding Exposé in 1984, he also wrote and produced all of the songs on its first album, Exposure (1987) and most of the songs on What You Don't Know (1989). He also contributed to the group's third effort, Exposé, in 1992.

The producer explained how Exposé began in a 2016 interview on music website, No Echo:

My girlfriend at the time, Aléjandra [Lorenzo], who went on to be known as 'Alé', she was doing the demos for these songs. The reason I had her doing that was that she would sing in the car along to the radio and I thought she sounded really good. So, after the 'Point of No Return' demo was done, I was searching for a singer who sounded like her for the record version. I was finally like, 'Why can't I just use her?'"

Martineé has also worked with many other artists of note, producing, writing and or remixing tracks for artists including Ricky Martin, Dead or Alive, Enrique Iglesias, Celine Dion, Company B, Arika Kane, Jermaine Jackson, Paris by Air, Sequal, the Cover Girls, Debbie Gibson, Vanessa Williams, Pet Shop Boys, Son by Four, and Elvis Crespo, among others. His contributions to the nascent freestyle music movement in the mid-1980s contributed to its popularity, which continues to this day. DJ Martineé has been doing a dance music radio show programmed all over the world with top ratings. Currently DJ Lewis Martinee is working on a new album in the Nu Disco genre to be released early 2024.
