= Gioia Bruno =

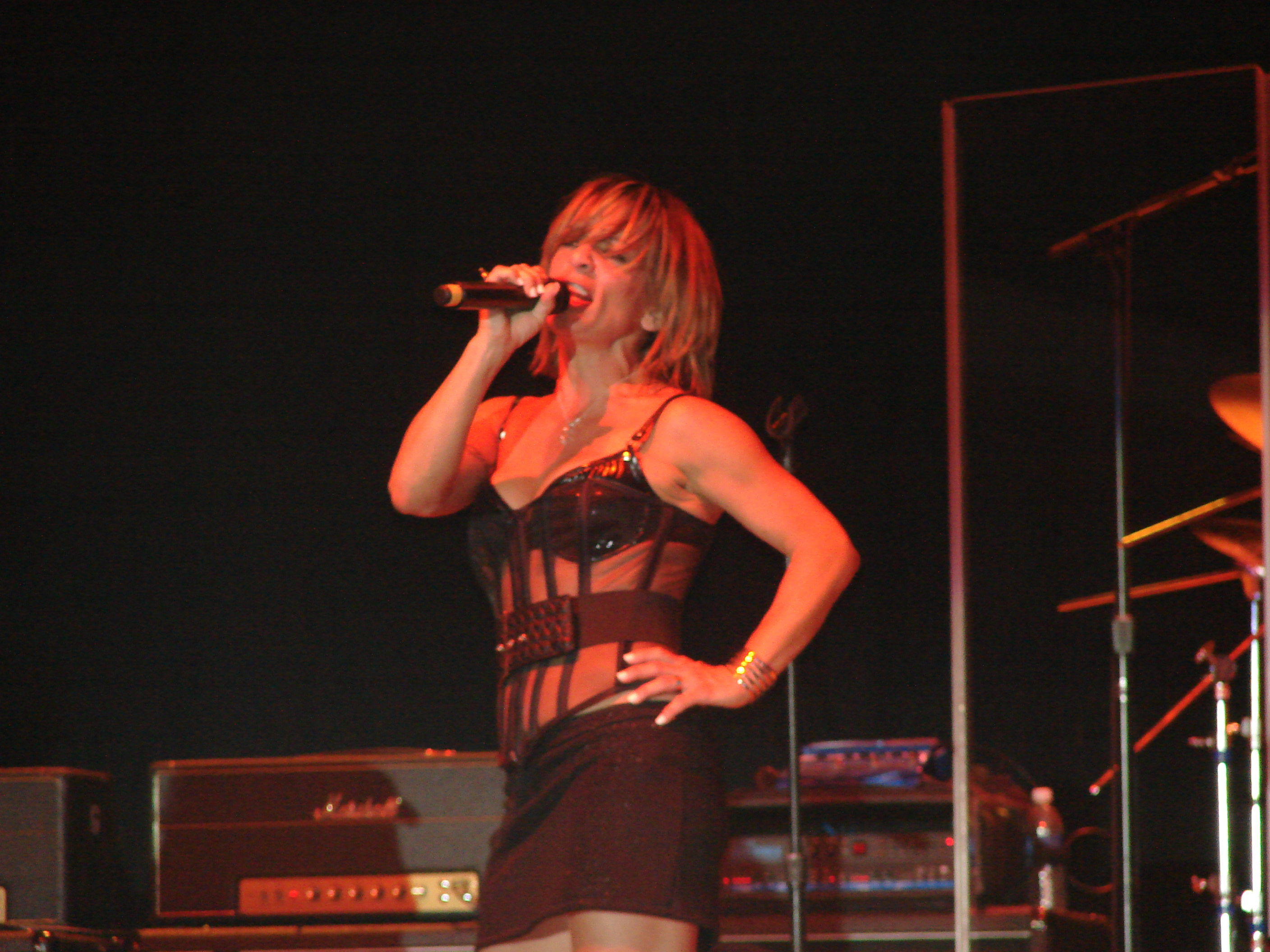
- Gioia Bruno performing in January 2010

Background information
- Born: Carmen Gioia Bruno; June 11, 1963 (age 63)
- Origin: Bari, Italy
- Genres: Dance-pop, house, Hi-NRG
- Occupations: Vocalist, Songwriter
- Instruments: Vocals, Percussion
- Years active: 1986–present
- Labels: Arista Records (1986-1996); Koch Entertainment (2003-present)

Gioia Bruno (born Carmen Gioia Bruno sometimes professionally credited as just Gioia) is an Italian-born American popular music singer, most noted as a member of the vocal group Exposé. In September 2006, Bruno temporarily stopped touring as a solo artist.

== Personal life ==
Bruno has been married and divorced two times. From her first marriage, to Joseph Pastore, she has a daughter, Brianna Pastore, who was born in 1988. In January 2006, Gioia acknowledged that she is bisexual.

== Discography ==
=== Albums ===
- Shelter (Lead Vocals, by the group Wet), 1996
- Expose This, 2004
- A GIOIAful Christmas, 2013

=== Singles ===
Year	Song	U.S. Club/Dance	U.S. Dance Airplay	U.S. Dance Singles Sales
1995	"Make That Move" (as G-Spot)	21	-	-
2001	"Free to Be"	1	-	-
2003	"From the Inside"	1	1	-
2004	"Wrecking My Nerves"	3	8	-
2004	"Be Mine"	34	-	-
2005	"Dreamin'(again)"	1	1	-
