= Asian hip-hop =

Music genre

Asian hip hop
- Stylistic origins: Hip Hop; Asian Music; Crossover
- Cultural origins: Early 1980s Asia
- Derivative forms: Asiatic Hip Hop, Asian Rap, 아시아 힙합

Regional scenes
- K-rap; J-rap; C-rap

Asian hip hop is a heterogeneous musical genre that covers all hip hop music as recorded and produced by artists of Asian origin.

== 1980s ==
=== Philippines ===
The Philippines is known to have had the first hip-hop music scene in Asia since the early 1980s, largely due to the country's historical connections with the United States The intimate relationship between hip-hop culture and the large Filipino American community along the United States West Coast naturally resulted in the exportation of rap music back to the Philippines. Numerous cassette tapes, videos, books and magazines concerning hip hop issues and popular rap artists would be sent out by Filipinos to family members back in the islands.

The towns and barrios surrounding the numerous American military bases that were scattered throughout that country such as Clark Air Base in Angeles City and Subic Bay Naval Base in Olongapo were among the earliest to be exposed to the culture; as contact with African-American, Filipino American and Latino servicemen resulted in some of the earliest exposure the locals had to the new musical genre.

In 1980, singer and stand-up comedian Dyords Javier would record "Na Onseng Delight", and Vincent Dafalong "Ispraken Delight". They are known to be the first rap records from Asia.

Hip hop films such as Wild Style (1982), Breakin' (1984) and Krush Groove (1985) were also major influences; and as early as 1982 local break-dancing crews were starting to emerge. Local parks and malls in and around the Metro Manila area became mainstays and training grounds for future recording artists.

=== Taiwan ===
The first Mandarin rap song was done by singer-songwriter Harlem Yu in Taiwan, who is known for being one of the first artists to experiment with R&B and rap in the Mandopop music industry, in the early '80s which was parallel to the early New York '80s rap songs.

=== Japan ===
In Japan, early hip-hop was not led by corporate interests, but rather was largely ignored by large record companies and performance venues. The first known Japanese group to experiment with hip hop was Yellow Magic Orchestra, which created an early electro hip hop track, "Rap Phenomena", for their 1981 album BGM. In turn, the synthpop and electro music of Yellow Magic Orchestra and Ryuichi Sakamoto, and their use of the Roland TR-808 drum machine, had a significant influence on early key American hip hop figures such as Afrika Bambaataa and Mantronix.

Like the Philippines, with the arrival of hip hop films came a generation of break-dancers, b-boys, Deejays, and training grounds for future recording artist. Street musicians began to breakdance in Yoyogi Park, including DJ Krush who has become a world-renowned DJ after arising from the Yoyogi Park scene. In 1986 an all hip hop club opened in Shibuya.

=== Malaysia ===
The arrival of hip hop films in Malaysia, started the emergence of the genre. The biggest local movie of 1984 Azura had a breakdancing scene in it. It spawned some local B-Boys and B-Girls but the development of the hip hop scene as a whole wouldn't happen until much later.

In 1989, DJ and owner of Valentine Sound Production, Joe Siva began with KL deejay/rap-based group Krash Kozz, who went on to be the first major hip hop act of Malaysia.

=== United States ===
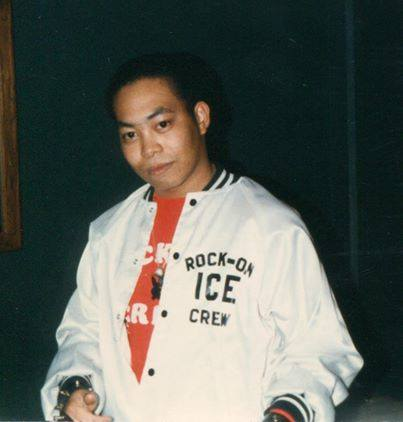
Fresh Kid Ice in the early 1980s.

==== Fresh Kid Ice of 2 Live Crew 1984 to 2017 ====
In the meantime (1984) in the US, three members of the U.S. Air Force, while stationed at March Air Force Base in Riverside, California, formed the rap group 2 Live Crew known to have popularized Miami Bass, a subgenre of hip hop music. This included the DJ David "Mr. Mixx" Hobbs, and two rappers Yuri "Amazing Vee" Vielot, and Christopher Fresh Kid Ice Wong Won (1964-2017). Wong won would become known as the first Asian rapper, his ethnicity is Afrochinese, his family is mostly from Hong Kong and both of his grandmothers were African. In many of his raps, he gave himself the nickname Chinaman.

After releasing a successful independent single, the group caught the attention of a Florida-based music promoter and DJ named Luther Campbell invited the group to work with him there. Vielot would quit the group shortly after. They then released the lyrically sexually charged single called "Throw The D" in January 1986 gave a permanent blueprint to how future Miami bass songs were written and produced. At the time Fresh Kid Ice was the only MC in the group and featured on the track. The fact that he was alone made him the first Miami Bass Rapper. It is rumored that he coined the term Miami Bass as well. Shortly after, Campbell would join the group as the hype man and Brother Marquis took over Amazing Vee's place.

The 2 Live Crew's debut album The 2 Live Crew Is What We Are (1986), and their second Move Somethin' (1988) both went Gold and were comedic albums with sexually explicit lyrics. Fresh Kid Ice and his group mate became American rap superstars of that area.

The group became notorious, influential, and legendary in 1989 with their third album As Nasty As They Wanna Be, along with its hit single "Me So Horny", proved more controversial still, leading to legal troubles getting obscenity charges for both 2 Live Crew and retailers selling the album (all charges were eventually overturned on appeal in the 1990s). The controversy lead to the album going double platinum.

Fresh Kid Ice, would make two more best selling albums with 2 Live Crew before disbanding in 1991. In 1992, he made his first solo album The Chinaman is the first American hip hop album to embrace an Asian heritage. It inverts Asian stereotypes into prideful declarations of self-identity. On the Billboard 200, it peaked at #38 and stayed two weeks on the Heatseekers Albums, and was #56 for ten weeks on the Top R&B/Hip-Hop Albums.

Various reunions of the 2 Live Crew would occur. All the albums produced from that point would chart, but all them would have one or two members of the original line up missing, however Fresh Kid Ice was the only one always present until the last official 2 Live Crew album The Real One in 1998.

In the early 2000s, Fresh Kid Ice released three albums Still Nasty (2000), Stop Playin' (2003), and Freaky Chinese (2004). Due to the graphic sexual nature of his lyrics, his music video could only be played on BET Uncut. Freaky Chinese is noted to be the first album where Flo Rida performed, whom he discovered and hired on to be his hypeman.

Circa 2006–2007 Fresh Kid Ice and Brother Marquis decided to relaunch 2 Live Crew. They toured together and released many singles. Fresh Kid ice would leave 2 Live Crew in 2016, and died in 2017 due to health issues.

=== Korea ===
In Korea, following the end of authoritarian military rule in Korea, the loosening of state censorship of popular music in the late 1980s and the arrival of 1988 Seoul Olympics brought global musical styles like hip hop, rap, and rhythm and blues through the Korean diaspora. Rock musician Hong Seo-beom's 1989 song about a 19th-century Korean poet, "Kim Sat-gat," is credited as being the first Korean pop song to contain rapping.

=== Burma (Myanmar) ===
The Burmese hip hop scene started in the lately 1980s with the famous rapper Myo Kyawt Myaing. His songs were more like plain rapping music rather than stereotypical hip hop. However between him and the next generation there would be a long gap.

== 1990s ==
=== Philippines to present day ===
In August 1990, Francis Magalona made his hit debut album, Yo!, known to be the first commercially released rap album in the country. Later in that same year, Andrew E also released his debut album, "Humanap Ka Ng Panget", known for its novelty hits. Bass Rhyme Posse would release their self-titled debut album on VIVA Records in 1991, and which spanned cult hits.

1992 marked a turning point for Pinoy rap with the release of Francis Magalona's influential second album, Rap Is Francis M, which is regarded as one of the greatest Pinoy rap albums. Ushering in a socially awoken wave, he would go on to make six more albums throughout the decade.

In 1993, Death Threat who are known to be the fathers of the gangsta rap subgenre in the Philippines, released their debut Death Threat:Gusto kong Bumaet and would make five more albums through this decade.

From that point many local charting artist would emerge these include Gloc-9, Lyrical Assault, and many more.

=== Taiwan cont. ===
L.A. Boyz is a Taiwanese pop/rap group composed of 2 brothers, and their cousin. They were raised in Irvine, California and met at its University High School. They first became involved in music through their interest in hip-hop dance moves learnt from parties around Orange County and Los Angeles, and fashion from Compton and South-Central LA. Their dancing, and entry into various competitions, eventually led them to be scouted by a representative of Pony Canyon, in Taiwan. They released 10 albums starting from their first “SHIAM! 閃” selling more than 130,000 copies in 1992. Their second album, released in the same year, was similarly received. The group was very successful in the 1990s until their break-up. They are credited for starting the trend that would spreads into Taiwan and the rest of the Mandarin speaking world.

=== Japan 1990s to present day ===
By the early 1990s major American artist started to tour and their release saw the light in Japan.

The years 1994 and 1995, marked the beginning of hip-hop's commercial success in Japan. The first hit was Schadaraparr's "Kon'ya wa būgi bakku" (Boogie Back Tonight) by Scha Dara Parr and Ozawa Kenji, followed by East End X Yuri's "Da. Yo. Ne." and "Maicca," which each sold a million copies. This sudden popularity of J-rap, which was largely characterized as party rap, sparked a debate over 'realness' and authenticity between commercial and underground hip-hop artists.

From 2000 on, the hip hop scene in Japan has grown and diversified. Hip-hop style and Japanese rap has been enormously commercially successful in Japan. In a 2003 interview with the BBC, Tokyo record-store owner, Hideaki Tamura noted "Japanese hip-hop really exploded in the last two, three years. I never thought there would be a time when Japanese records could outsell American ones but it's happening." Additionally, a huge number of new scenes have developed. These include "rock rap to hard core gangsta, spoken word/poetry, to conscious, old school, techno rap, antigovernment, pro-marijuana, heavymetal-sampled rap, and so on.”

Tamura points to a shift in Japanese hip hop, when artists began to focus on issues pertinent to Japanese society, versus previous styles and subjects that were copied from US hip hop culture. For Japan, the style of hip hop was much more appealing than topics popular in American hip hop, such as violence. Ian Condry, on the other hand, focuses on an interplay between local and global hip hop within the genba of Japan. For Condry, Japanese hip hop was born out of simultaneous localization and globalization of hip hop culture, rather than a shift between the two binary factors.

=== Malaysia cont. 1990s to present day ===
In 1990, Krash Kozz, releasing the group's debut Pump It!. With their mix of New Jack Swing melodies and Run DMC-influenced rap, Krash Kozz became a sensation in their home country, and even managed to chart on the Asia Billboard charts, one of the first Asian hip hop acts to do so. Siva later joined the group as their DJ.

From that point many local charting artist would emerge these include KRU, K-Town Clan, Chakra Sonic, Poetic Ammo, Mizz Nina, Too Phat, and many more.

=== US cont. ===
Turntablists

By the 1990s, hip hop turntablists of Filipino descent came to prominence this include DJ Qbert, Mix Master Mike, and the Invisibl Skratch Piklz. as well as the inventions of the "crab scratch", "tweak scratch", "strobing", and furthering the development of "flare scratching".

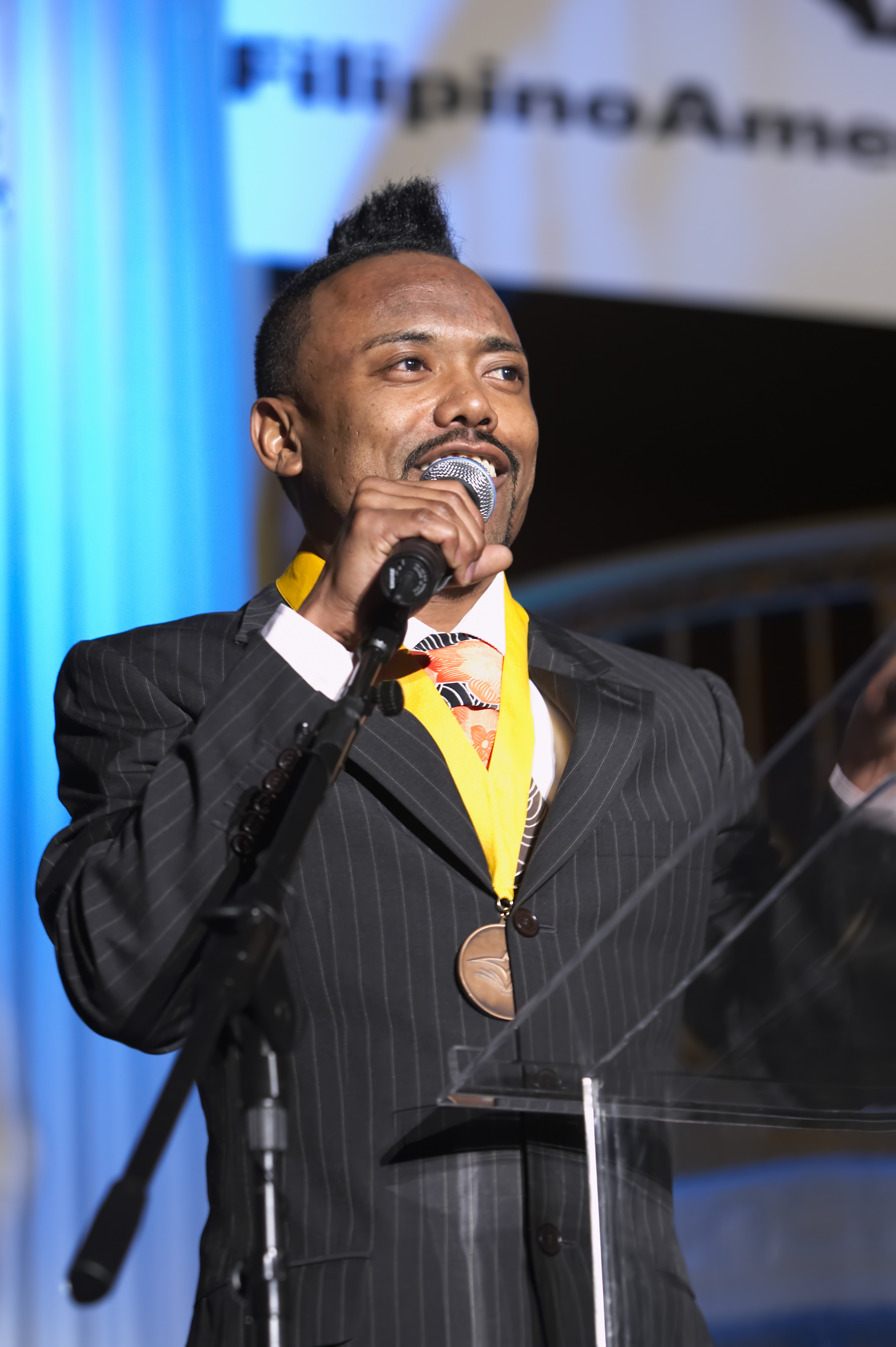
Apl.de.ap being honored at the Filipino American Library Spirit Awards and Dinner GALA in Los Angeles, California.

apl.de.ap of The Black Eyed Peas 1992 to present day

In 1992, apl.de.ap a Filipino descent rapper, with his group mate will.i.am, and several others had their group Atban Klann sign to Ruthless Records (run by Eazy-E). They made their first appearance on Eazy-E's EP, 5150: Home 4 tha Sick on the track entitled "Merry Muthaphuckkin' Xmas". Soon after, the duo recorded their debut album, Grass Roots which was to be released on October 6, 1992; however, the album was shelved shortly before its release. The duo would stay with Ruthless until they were dropped from the label after Eazy-E's death in 1995. Soon after they changed their name to Black Eyed Peas. Another vocalist would join, Taboo, and they made their critically acclaimed debut Behind the Front.

In 2000, apl.de.ap and the Black Eyed Peas released Bridging the Gap, which was met with critical acclaim.

For their third album in 2003, female singer Fergie joined and they made Elephunk. It was a big success and made apl.de.ap and his bandmates rap superstars of that area. In the United States, Elephunk reached number 14 on the Billboard Top 200 and was their first album to chart in the top 15. On the UK Album Charts it reached number 3. It has sold over 1.6 million copies in the UK and 8.5 million copies worldwide.

In 2004, their album Monkey Business was also a big success. Afterwards, the group went on a hiatus.

They came back in 2009 with the album The E.N.D., and 2010's The Beginning. Both albums did well on the charts.

From 2012 to present, apl.de.ap started solo ventures, with a music video called "Jump In" featuring Jessica Sanchez. In March 2013, apl.de.ap was confirmed to be one of the four coaches of the inaugural season of The Voice of the Philippines. He released several singles: "Balikbayan", "Going Out", and "Be".

Mountain Brothers 1990s to 2003

Mountain Brothers are considered cultural pioneers, being one of the first Asian American hip-hop groups and also for the lack of sampling of other music in construction of their own. Mountain Brothers released two critically acclaimed albums, Self Vol 1(1999) and Triple Crown(2003), the first of which is widely considered to be an independent hip-hop classic.

=== Korea cont. ===
In 1990, Hyun Jin-young is considered to be the first Korean hip hop artist. That year he debuted with the album, New Dance.

In 1992, Seo Taiji and Boys, who are known to be the fathers of K-pop, debuted with the song, "Nan Arayo,". They incorporated American-style hip hop and R&B into their music, their popularity paved the way for both pop and hip hop artists in Korea.

In 1993, the duo Deux debuted with their self-titled album which featured the hit song, "Turn Around and Look at Me". They helped introduce hip hop and new jack swing to Korea, the duo is also notable for popularizing hip hop. After releasing three more albums, they broke up in 1995 to pursue solo careers.

In 1994, the group DJ Doc released their first album, Sorrow of Superman, would be very successful in the molding of K-pop and hip hop.

Toward the end of the 1990s, the Korean hip hop scene grew considerably, while K-pop groups continued to incorporate rap into their songs, this time period also saw the emergence of pure hip hop groups, notably Drunken Tiger. They released their first album, Year of the Tiger in Korea in 1999. At the time, the album was controversial given its explicit lyrics and rejection of mainstream k-pop norms. Unlike their k-pop counterparts, Drunken Tiger wrote their own lyrics, expressed anti-establishment views, and did not perform choreography.

=== Indian hip hop 1990s to present day ===
Hip Hop music in India started in the 1990s and Apache Indian and Baba Sehgal are credited as India's first rappers. The song "Pettai Rap" from the Tamil movie Kaadhalan catapulted Suresh Peters as a rapper and a music director. Indian hip-hop developed slowly in the early 2000s, as earlier efforts by artists such as Baba Sehgal and Apache Indian failed to create substantial buzz, due to their styles being more rap–oriented than representative of the larger hip-hop scene. It was initially confined to urban areas with niche and expatriate audiences. London based The Rishi Rich Project, Bally Sagoo and Canadian based Raghav further laid steady foundations for Hip-Hop/RnB music in India. California based Punjabi rapper Bohemia became one of the most well known pioneers of Punjabi Rap in the country after producing tracks like "Kali Denali" and "Ek Tera Pyar". He became the first hip-hop artist to launch a full desi hip-hop album, Pesa Nasha Pyaar, in 2006, while he was signed to Universal Music India. He has also produced songs for Bollywood movies like Chandni Chowk to China and 8 x 10 Tasveer. International artists like 50 Cent, Mobb Deep, The Black Eyed Peas etc. have performed in India. American rapper Snoop Dogg appeared in a song from the film Singh Is Kinng (2008) which popularized hip-hop music amongst the people of India. Meanwhile, Yo Yo Honey Singh transformed, popularized hip-hop and rap into the mainstream Indian audience, beginning with the release of the track "Glassy" in 2006 with Ashok Masti which featured Singh rapping in English and the music being produced by himself as well. Singh's crew, Mafia Mundeer, was, according to him, a platform to establish new artists in the industry. The platform has since become notable as the roster included now-famous Indian rappers like Raftaar, Ikka (formerly Young Amli), Lil Golu and allegedly Badshah. The rap-battle and cypher scene in India started developing with rappers like the late Knuckle Dusta, Ghost Status, Panini, and Rawal, creating a blueprint for the culture, which was further shaped by rappers like Seedhe Maut, MC Kode, Yungsta, Prabh Deep, Frappe Ash operating in the Delhi circuit with communities like SpitDope and 6FU, and groups like Mumbai’s Finest and The HipHop Movement, laid the foundation for rappers like Divine, Enkore, Kinga Rhymes, Kav-E, Poetik Justis to carry the Mumbai cypher scene forward.

=== Hong Kong hip hop 1990s to present day ===
Hong Kong hip hop can be traced in Hong Kong from the early 1990s with singers such as Sandy Lam and Shirley Kwan.

Sandy Lam's first EP for Warner Music, Getting Mad in 1991, had hip hop influences and was one of the few EPs in Hong Kong to go platinum in the 1990s. The other is being Shirley Kwan's Golden Summer in the same year, that a song called Dear had rapping from Softhard.

The Hong Kong hip hop scene developed in 1991 with Softhard and in 1999 with the formation of LMF, the first rap/rock group signed by a major record label

=== China ===
The first Chinese language song to feature rap style content was by rock artist Cui Jian in the early 90s, though viewed as experimental. Mainstream American hip hop started to emerge in clubs, as well as the influence of Taiwan and Hong Kong hip hop.

=== Indonesia 1990s to present day ===
Hip hop music began to be produced in Indonesia in the early 1990s, with the first Indonesia artist to release a full-length hip hop album being the rapper Iwa K, who has released five albums to date. Other Indonesian rap groups include Boyz Got No Brain and Neo. Many Indonesian rap groups rap in the Indonesian language, but there are also groups which rap in English. Variously, rap songs often combine formal Indonesian with street slang, youth code, regionally colored pronunciations, and even expressions from regional languages (typically Javanese, Sundanese, or Betawi).

Indonesian rapper, Rich Brian (formerly "Rich Chigga') gained internet popularity through his single, "Dat Stick" in 2016, with the song peaking at number 4 on the US Bubbling Under R&B/Hip-Hop Singles chart.

=== Singapore 1990s to present day ===
The Singapore hip hop scene has grown to become a major component of Singapore's music scene. Due to Singapore's diversity the country's rap encompasses many languages including English, Mandarin, Tamil and Malay.

Shigga Shay and Grizzle Grind Crew are examples of popular rappers/groups in Singapore's hip hop scene.

== 2000s ==
=== Taiwan cont. 2000s to present day ===
In 2001, MC HotDog arrived in the Taiwanese market. He is known for his use of explicit lyrics in his songs. He is known for his two famous hits - "我的生活" (My Life) and "韓流來襲" (The Korean Invasion).

In 2002, Dwagie released Lotus from the Tongue (舌粲蓮花), and is described as a "pro-Taiwan rapper".

Ever since many Taiwanese rappers have emerged, this includes Jae Chong, Aziatix, Machi, Nine One One, and many more.

=== USA cont. 2000s to present day ===
cont.

MC Jin

In 2001, MC Jin had a break came when the BET program 106 & Park began inviting local rappers to hold battles in a segment known as Freestyle Friday. After he had signed a deal with the Ruff Ryders label.

In October 2004, Jin released his debut album, The Rest Is History, which reached number 54 of the Billboard Top 200 albums chart.

In 2005, he released The Emcee's Properganda. Following this he released many singles.

New generation of rappers

Ever since many Asian rappers have emerged in the USA this includes Traphik, Jay Park, Kero One, Rich Brian, The Fung Brothers, Far East Movement, Dumbfoundead, and Awkwafina.

=== China cont. 2000s to present day ===
In mainland China the hip hop scene includes artists such as Yin Ts'ang (隐藏), Hei Bomb (黑棒), and Dragon Tongue (龙门阵) all of whom currently lead the genre and are gaining popularity with the youths. Other groups include LMF and Dai Bing. The Chinese term for rap is Rao-she (Traditional Chinese:饒舌;) or shuōchàng (Simplified Chinese: 说唱; "narrative", actually the name of a traditional genre of narrative singing). Breakdancing (called "jiēwŭ" (Simplified Chinese: 街舞) in Chinese, literally "street dance") has gained a lot of popularity among young Chinese as well.

=== Burma (Myanmar): 2000s to present day ===
In contemporary Myanmar, hip-hop has become part of the country's popular music culture, particularly among younger audiences. Hip-hop artists and enthusiasts express themselves through rap music and fashion, although the development of the genre has also raised questions about the distinction between hip-hop as a musical culture and its broader influence on popular culture.

=== Bangladesh: 2000s to present day ===
Bengali hip hop differs from Bengali Hip Hop mainly from the language. Bengali is more "formal" than Bengali and use less slang than Bengali. Bengali is based mostly on Dhaka, Barisal, Sylhet, Chittagong, Comilla.

=== Nepal: 2000s to present day ===
Nepalese hip hop or NepHop includes elements of MCing, DJing, B-boying, and graffiti writing. Yama Buddha was a popular rapper in the country's hip hop scene. Nepalese hip-hop's origin can be traced back to 1994.

=== Pakistan: 2000s to present day ===
In Pakistan, Pakistani-American rapper Bohemia's influence extended across borders to India as well. Bohemia is credited with coining the term 'desi hip-hop', that effectively categorizes the hip-hop of the Indian subcontinent under a single umbrella. Pakistani rappers who migrated to Western countries and rose to mainstream fame, such as Imran Khan and Lazarus have gained a considerable traction in the country. Modern-day Pakistani rappers like Young Stunners and Faris Shafi are presently propelling the scene forward.
