= 2 Live Crew discography =

2 Live Crew has released eight studio albums, one live album and 27 singles.

== Albums ==
=== Studio albums ===
List of studio albums, with selected chart positions and certifications
Title	Details	Peak chart positions		Certifications
Title	Details	US	US R&B/HH	Certifications
The 2 Live Crew Is What We Are	Released: July 25, 1986; Label: Luke; Format: CD, cassette, LP	128	24	RIAA: Gold
Move Somethin'	Released: August 17, 1988; Label: Luke; Format: CD, cassette, LP	68	20	RIAA: Gold
As Nasty as They Wanna Be	Released: February 7, 1989; Label: Luke; Format: CD, cassette, LP	29	3	RIAA: Platinum
Banned in the U.S.A.	Released: July 13, 1990; Label: Luke; Format: CD, cassette, LP	21	10	RIAA: Gold
Sports Weekend	Released: October 8, 1991; Label: Luke; Format: CD, cassette, LP	22	19	RIAA: Gold
Back at Your Ass for the Nine-4	Released: February 8, 1994; Label: Luke; Format: CD, cassette, LP	52	9	
Shake a Lil' Somethin'	Released: August 6, 1996; Label: Lil' Joe; Format: CD, cassette, digital download, LP	145	33	
The Real One	Released: April 7, 1998; Label: Lil' Joe; Format: CD, cassette, digital download, LP	—	59	
"—" denotes a recording that did not chart or was not released in that territory.

=== Live albums ===
List of live albums, with selected chart positions
Title	Details	Peak chart positions	
Title	Details	US	US R&B/HH
Live in Concert	Released: September 22, 1990; Label: Luke	92	46

== Singles ==
List of singles, with selected chart positions
Title	Year	Peak chart positions									Album
Title	Year	US	US R&B/HH	US Rap	AUS	BEL (FL)	FIN	NLD	NZ	UK	Album
"The Revelation"	1984	—	—	x	—	—	—	—	—	—	Non-album singles
"What I Like"	1985	—	—	x	—	—	—	—	—	—	Non-album singles
"Throw the Dick"	1986	—	—	x	—	—	—	—	—	—	2 Live Is What We Are
"Get It Girl"	1986	—	—	x	—	—	—	—	—	—	2 Live Is What We Are
"We Want Some Pussy!"	1987	—	—	x	—	—	—	—	—	—	2 Live Is What We Are
"Move Somethin'"	1988	—	53	x	—	—	—	—	—	—	Move Somthin'
"Do Wah Diddy"	1988	—	62	x	—	—	—	—	—	—	Move Somthin'
"Yakety Yak"	1989	—	—	22	—	—	15	—	—	90	Twins OST
"The Bomb Has Dropped" (with Trouble Funk)	1989	—	92	12	—	—	—	—	—	—	Non-album single
"Me So Horny"	1989	26	34	1	180	9	21	1	31	—	As Nasty as They Wanna Be
"We Want Some Pussy! '89"	1989	—	—	—	168	—	—	—	—	—	Non-album single
"C'mon Babe"	1989	—	—	7	—	—	—	—	—	—	As Nasty as They Wanna Be
"The Funk Shop" (single title)	1990	—	—	14	—	—	—	47	—	—	As Nasty as They Wanna Be
"Coolin'" (UK only)	1990	—	—	—	—	—	—	—	—	—	As Nasty as They Wanna Be
"Banned in the U.S.A."	1990	20	13	1	—	—	—	28	—	—	Banned in the U.S.A.
"Mama Juanita"	1990	—	47	12	—	—	—	—	—	—	Banned in the U.S.A.
"Do the Bart"	1991	—	76	24	—	—	—	—	—	—	Banned in the U.S.A.
"Pop That Coochie"	1991	58	55	5	97	—	—	—	33	—	Sports Weekend
"Who's Doin' Who"	1991	—	—	—	—	—	—	—	—	—	Sports Weekend
"Mega Mix"	1993	—	—	—	—	—	—	—	—	—	Greatest Hits
"Yeah, Yeah"	1994	—	93	38	—	—	—	—	—	—	Back at Your Ass for the Nine-4
"You Go Girl"	1994	—	88	43	—	—	—	—	—	—	Back at Your Ass for the Nine-4
"Shake a Lil' Somethin'"	1996	72	59	11	—	—	—	—	—	—	Shake a Lil' Somethin'
"Do the Damn Thing"	1996	107	75	24	—	—	—	—	—	—	Shake a Lil' Somethin'
"Be My Private Dancer / Table Dance"	1997	—	—	—	—	—	—	—	—	—	Shake a Lil' Somethin'
"2 Live Party"	1998	102	52	9	—	—	—	—	—	—	The Real One
"The Real One"	1998	103	60	9	—	—	—	—	—	—	The Real One
"—" denotes a recording that did not chart or was not released in that territory. "x" indicates the chart did not exist at the time.
