= Deal with This =

Compilation album by 2 Live Crew
- Released: January 20, 1993
- Recorded: 1984–1990
- Genre: Hip hop
- Length: 46:43
- Label: Macola Records
- Producer: 2 Live Crew

2 Live Crew chronology
Sports Weekend: As Nasty as They Wanna Be, Pt. 2 (1991)	Deal with This (1993)	Back at Your Ass for the Nine-4 (1994)

Professional ratings
Review scores
Source	Rating
Allmusic	2/5 stars

Deal with This is a compilation album by American rap group 2 Live Crew. It was released independently on January 20, 1993 via Macola Records and was entirely produced by Mr. Mixx (David P. Hobbs) and Fresh Kid Ice (Christopher Wong Won) under Rock On Crew and 2 Live Crew monikers. The tracks that appeared on this album were unreleased songs that Wong Won and Hobbs recorded before Brother Marquis (Mark D. Ross) and Luke Skyywalker (Luther Campbell) joined the group.

== Track listing ==
No.	Title	Writer(s)	Producer(s)	Length
1.	"Serious Conversation"	C. Wong Won	Rock On Crew	4:20
2.	"Fresh Kid Ice is Back"	C. Wong Won; D. Hobbs; Y. Vielot	2 Live Crew	4:34
3.	"Tab Ski Cuttin' it Up"	C. Wong Won	Rock On Crew	3:30
4.	"Revelation"	C. Wong Won; D. Hobbs; Y. Vielot	2 Live Crew	6:05
5.	"Dead Ass Broke"	C. Wong Won	Rock On Crew	3:42
6.	"Free Style"	C. Wong Won	Rock On Crew	3:21
7.	"It's Gotta Be Fresh"	C. Wong Won; D. Hobbs	2 Live Crew	5:47
8.	"Jack Boy Story"	C. Wong Won	Rock On Crew	3:28
9.	"What I Like" (Instrumental)	C. Wong Won; D. Hobbs; Y. Vielot	2 Live Crew	4:30
10.	"What I Like" (Scratch)	D. Hobbs	2 Live Crew	7:10
Total length:				46:43

== Personnel ==
- Christopher Wong Won - performer, producer
- David P. Hobbs - performer, producer
- Yuri Vielot - performer
