= Pop That Coochie =

Single by 2 Live Crew

from the album Sports Weekend: As Nasty as They Wanna Be, Pt. 2
- Released: August 30, 1991
- Recorded: 1991
- Genre: Miami bass; porn rap
- Length: 4:17
- Label: Luke Records
- Songwriter(s): Luther Campbell; David Hobbs; Marquis Ross; Christopher Wongwon
- Producer(s): David Hobbs

2 Live Crew singles chronology
"Do the Bart" (1991)	"Pop That Coochie" (1991)	"Hangin' With the Homeboys" (1992)

"Pop That Coochie" ("Pop That Pussy" on the album) is a song by American hip hop group 2 Live Crew. It was released on August 30, 1991, as the lead single from their album Sports Weekend: As Nasty as They Wanna Be, Pt. 2. The song reached number 58 on the U.S. Billboard Hot 100 and peaked at number 33 in New Zealand.

== Charts ==
Chart performance for "Pop That Coochie"
Chart (1991)	Peak position
Australia (ARIA)	97
New Zealand (Recorded Music NZ)	33
US Billboard Hot R&B/Hip-Hop Songs	55
US Billboard Hot 100	58
US Billboard Hot Rap Tracks	5
