= Nick Navarro (sheriff) =

American sheriff and businessman (1929–2011)

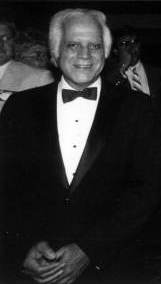

Sheriff of Broward County, Florida
- In office 1985–1993
- Preceded by: George Brescher
- Succeeded by: Ron Cochran

Personal details
- Born: November 11, 1929
- Died: September 28, 2011 (aged 81)
- Party: Republican

Nicholas G. Navarro (November 11, 1929 – September 28, 2011) was a Cuban-American businessman. He served as sheriff of Broward County, Florida, from 1985 to 1993.

He won election for sheriff in 1984. During Navarro's tenure the Broward Sheriff's Office (BSO) approximately doubled, to 3,000 personnel, and its budget increased from $75 million to $200 million. This period coincided with the end of the Miami drug war and the shift in focus to the larger war on drugs. Contracts were added for the BSO to provide law enforcement services to three Broward cities—Dania Beach, Tamarac, and Deerfield Beach.

Navarro was defeated in the 1993 election.

== Early life ==
Navarro was born in Jaruco, Cuba in 1929.

== COPS ==
In 1989, Navarro allowed Fox Television crews to ride along with BSO deputies for several months, taping the material which would become the inaugural season of the television show COPS.

== 2 Live Crew controversy ==
In 1989, Florida Governor Bob Martinez ordered state prosecutors to determine whether Miami-area rappers 2 Live Crew's album As Nasty as They Wanna Be violated Florida obscenity laws. Navarro proceeded to arrest local record store owners for selling the album and members of the rap group after a concert. All arrested parties were eventually acquitted. The judge who heard the case reprimanded the sheriff for "the unconstitutional act of prior restraint" because his detectives warned record store owners that they might be arrested if they sold the rap album, even though it had not yet been found legally obscene.

On Banned in the USA, their follow-up album, 2 Live Crew included a song entitled "Fuck Martinez", which also includes multiple repetitions of the phrase "Fuck Navarro". The group found two other men with the same names, and had them sign releases, as they thought that this action would make it impossible for Martinez, or Navarro, to sue them.

== Post elected-office ==
In 1993, Navarro founded Navarro Security Group Ltd., a private security service company. On September 28, 2011, he died from complications of cancer, aged 81.
