= Mr. Mixx =

American DJ, producer, and co-founder of rap group 2 Live Crew

- Born: David P. Hobbs; September 23, 1963 (age 62)
- Origin: Santa Ana, California, U.S.
- Genres: Miami bass
- Occupations: DJ, music producer, vocalist, turntablist
- Instruments: Turntables, keyboards
- Years active: 1983–present
- Labels: Luke Skyywalker Records; Lil’ Joe Records; MIXX INTL

David P. Hobbs (born September 23, 1963), also known by his stage name Mr. Mixx, is an American musician and record producer who is the co-founder of the controversial rap group 2 Live Crew.

In 1986, Hobbs and the group released the single "Throw The 'D'"; it is now considered the blueprint of Miami bass. Later in 1986, 2 Live Crew released their debut album, The 2 Live Crew Is What We Are. The album established the group's signature style of comical sexually explicit lyrics. After a slew of successful releases, the group met with considerable controversy as a U.S. district court ruled the album legally obscene. They were prosecuted but acquitted.

Hobbs produced popular 2 Live Crew singles such as "Throw the D", "Me So Horny", "Hoochie Mama", and other titles in the group's Miami bass musical catalog. Currently, Hobbs continues to DJ and produce other artists.

== Early life ==
Hobbs was born on September 23, 1963, and raised in Santa Ana, California.

In 1981, Hobbs graduated from Corona High School in nearby Corona, California, and enlisted in the United States Air Force shortly afterward.

== Career ==
=== 1984: Military service and founding of 2 Live Crew ===
In 1984, while stationed at March Air Force Base near Riverside, California, Hobbs met fellow musicians and United States Air Force Airmen Amazing Vee (Yuri Vielot) and Fresh Kid Ice (Christopher Wong Won). The trio, with Hobbs as DJ and Wong Won and Vielot as rappers, went on to form 2 Live Crew and would perform in small venues near the base, eventually releasing the group's first singles "The Revelation" and "2 Live Beat Box", on their own label independent label Fresh Beat Records, that same year.

"The Revelation" and "2 Live Beat Box" became popular in Florida, so much so that, following their discharge from the United States Air Force, Hobbs and Wong Won eventually relocated to Miami at the behest of local concert promoter Luther Campbell, who helped cultivate the momentum the group was establishing in the area. Hobbs used the Roland 808 drum machine to DJ 2 Live shows.

=== 1985–1986: Miami Bass DJ and 2 Live Crew success ===
In 1985, 2 Live Crew released their follow up single, "What I Like" on Fresh Beat Records. That same year, the group entered into a joint venture with Campbell and formed Luke Skyywalker Records. Shortly after forming the record label, Campbell joined 2 Live Crew as a hype man. In April, 1986, rapper Brother Marquis (Mark D. Ross) joined 2 Live Crew, replacing Vielot, who left the group shortly after its relocation to Miami.

In January 1987, 2 Live Crew released the EP "Throw the D" with "Ghetto Bass" on the B-side, with Hobbs as DJ and producer on both tracks."Throw the D" became an influential blueprint as to how future Miami bass songs were written and produced. Hobbs' performances on these releases made him the first Miami Bass scratch DJ.

The reconfigured group, featuring their most well known lineup (Hobbs, Campbell, Wong Won and Ross) became popular locally and nationally with the release of their Gold-certified debut album, The 2 Live Crew Is What We Are on January 25, 1987. Notorious for sexually explicit lyrics, the album made Hobbs and his bandmates rap superstars.

=== 1988–1991: Continued 2 Live Crew success and attendant controversy ===
In 1988, 2 Live Crew released their second album, Move Somethin' It was also certified Gold and featured the singles "Move Somethin'" and "Do Wah Diddy Diddy". The album improved on the charts from the previous album, making in to #68 on the Billboard 200 and #20 on the Top R&B/Hip Hop Albums charts. A separate ”clean” version of the album, suitable for radio play, was released in addition to the explicit version.

2 Live Crew’s third album As Nasty As They Wanna Be (1989), became the group’s most successful commercial studio album and was certified double Platinum by the Recording Industry Association of America. The album’s lead single "Me So Horny" peaked at 26 of the Billboard Top 100 chart. A clean version of the album, As Clean As They Wanna Be was released concurrently with the explicit version.

In 1990, the United States District Court for the Southern District of Florida ruled As Nasty As They Wanna Be to be legally obscene, becoming the first album in history to be so declared by a federal court; this ruling was later overturned by the U.S. Court of Appeals for the Eleventh Circuit. An obscenity trial followed, where all of the defendants, including Hobbs, were eventually acquitted of all charges.

In late 1990, following the verdict in the obscenity trial, 2 Live Crew released their fourth studio album, Banned in the U.S.A.. The album included the hits "Do the Bart" and the title track which peaked at 20 on the Billboard Top 100 chart. The eponymous title single referred to the earlier federal court obscenity ruling regarding the group's previous album As Nasty As They Wanna Be. Bruce Springsteen granted the group permission to interpolate his song "Born in the U.S.A." for the single. Banned in the U.S.A. was also the first album to bear the RIAA-standard Parental Advisory warning sticker.

Live in Concert, 2 Live Crew's fifth album and only live album, was also released in 1990. The album peaked at number 46 on the Top R&B/Hip-Hop Albums chart.

Sports Weekend: As Nasty as They Wanna Be, Pt. 2, featuring the single "Pop That Coochie," which reached 58 on the Hot 100 chart, was released by 2 Live Crew in 1991. The group's sixth album was a sequel of sorts to As Nasty As They Wanna Be, and was also accompanied by a clean version, Sports Weekend: As Clean As They Wanna Be, Pt. 2.

Sports Weekend: As Nasty as They Wanna Be, Pt. 2 would be the last studio album to include all of the most well known members of the group, Hobbs, Wong Won, Ross, and Campbell.

=== 1993–1999: Final albums with the most well known 2 Live crew line up, solo projects and 2 Live Crew reunion ===
In 1994, Hobbs formed a group, Mr. Mixx and Da Roughneck Posse, which released the studio album One Monkey Don't Stop No Show. That same year, with a group called Bass Poets, Hobbs released the album Bass-Boom-Booty.

In 1995, Hobbs, Wong Won, and Ross reunited to release the single "Hoochie Mama" for the soundtrack of the popular 1995 movie Friday. The soundtrack reached No. 1 on the Billboard 200 chart, where it held its position for two weeks, and remained on the Top R&B/Hip-Hop Albums chart for six weeks.

Also in 1995, Hobbs teamed up with producer Billy Vidal to release several Miami Bass compilations from 1995 through 1997.

In 1996, Hobbs again reunited with Wong Won and Ross as the 2 Live Crew, to perform, produce and release the group's seventh studio album Shake a Lil' Somethin' whose hit song of the same name, peaked at #72 on the Top 100 chart and #11 on the Hot Rap Songs|Hot Rap Singles chart. Two of the album's singles charted: "Do the Damn Thing", which made it to #24 on the Hot Rap Singles chart, and "Be My Private Dancer", which peaked at #34. Shake A Lil' Somethin' would be the last 2 Live Crew album to feature Hobbs.

In 1998, Hobbs released his first solo album The Sex Files.

=== 2000-present: Solo albums and current projects ===
In 2002, Hobbs released his second solo studio album Nasty Controversial & Unauthorized Part 1.

In 2005, Hobbs released his third solo album Vgnl Minded on his own independent label, Mr. Mixx Recordings.

From 2008 to 2011, Hobbs created and ran his own website, Collegepeepshowtv.com.

In 2009, Hobbs released his fourth solo album The Money And The Booty .

In 2010, Hobbs briefly reunited with former bandmates Wong Won, Ross, and Campbell as 2 Live Crew, and were honored at the 2010 VH1 Hip-Hop Honors: The Dirty South Edition awards show where they also performed.

In 2016, Hobbs reunited with Ross to reform 2 Live Crew shortly before Wong Won's death in 2017. The duo subsequently released two singles How Bout Dem Cowboys (2016) and One Horse Sleigh (2016), and continued to tour nationally as 2 Live Crew, until Ross' death in 2024.
