= Move Somethin' =

Move Somethin' may refer to:

- Move Somethin' (album), a 1988 album by 2 Live Crew
- "Move Somethin'", a song by Reflection Eternal (Talib Kweli & DJ Hi-Tek) from their 2000 album Train of Thought
- "Move Somethin'", a song by LL Cool J from his 2004 album The DEFinition
