= Brother Marquis =

American rapper (1966–2024)

- Brother Marquis, c. late 1980s – early 1990s

Background information
- Born: Mark D. Ross; April 4, 1966; Rochester, New York, U.S.
- Origin: Los Angeles, California, U.S.
- Died: June 3, 2024 (aged 58) Gadsden, Alabama, U.S.
- Occupation: Rapper
- Years active: 1983–2024
- Labels: Luke; Attitude; Playalistic; Lil' Joe

Mark D. Ross (April 4, 1966 – June 3, 2024), better known by his stage name Brother Marquis, was an American rapper and a Miami bass pioneer. Ross was born in Rochester, New York. In his teens, he moved with his mother to Los Angeles, California. By the early 1980s, Ross started to release music and made an impression on DJ and producer David Hobbs (Mr. Mixx). Hobbs was part of the group 2 Live Crew, who had just created the Miami Bass blueprint, and were successful in Florida. This led Ross accepting an invitation to join them. Due to his comedic sensibilities, Ross integrated easily into the direction the group was taking. Alongside Hobbs, Christopher Wong Won (Fresh Kid Ice), and Luther Campbell (Luke Skyywalker), they became the most well-known line up of the group. In 1986, they had a breakthrough with their Gold-certified debut album, The 2 Live Crew Is What We Are.

The group's success came with controversies due to the explicit nature of their humor. They continued their rise to fame with their second album, Move Somethin' (1988), which also went Gold. Their third album, As Nasty As They Wanna Be (1989), was certified Platinum and found legally obscene by the United States District Court for the Southern District of Florida (soon overruled). In the press, the group received national scrutiny. They were prosecuted and acquitted. Prior to separating, they made two more Gold albums: Banned in the U.S.A. (1990) and Sports Weekend: As Nasty as They Wanna Be, Pt. 2 (1991).

In the early 1990s, Ross embarked on various musical endeavors. He formed the duo 2 Nazty with DJ Toomp and released the album Indecent Exposure in 1993. During the same year, Ross was a featured rapper on Ice-T's album Home Invasion, contributing to the original version of "99 Problems", which later was remade by Jay-Z into a top charting hit.

With different lineups Ross made two more albums with 2 Live Crew Shake a Lil' Somethin' (1996), which reached #145 on the Billboard 200, and The Real One,(1998) which peaked at #59 on the Top R&B/Hip-Hop Albums chart. In 2006, Ross and Wong Won, as 2 Live Crew, reunited, started touring, released singles, and made several album announcements until Wong Won's death in 2017.

== Early life ==
Born on April 4, 1966, Ross explained that he spent his early life in Rochester, New York with his mother. In his teens, they moved to Los Angeles, California.

== Career ==
=== 1983–1986 Early career, joining 2 Live Crew and the group's breakthrough ===
In 1983, Ross and fellow rapper Rodney-O formed The Caution Crew and released twelve-inch singles "Westside Storie" and "Rhythm Rock". Ross said that they were created during his time living in California while he was in junior high. Ross explained that his rapper's name, Brother Marquis, was coined by his cousin, who, due to his Muslim faith, frequently referred to others as "Brother." The two would engage in Islamic practices and spend time together in a Grand Marquis car. Over time, his cousin began calling him Brother Marquis.

Eventually, he caught the attention of music producer and DJ David Hobbs, also known as Mr. Mixx, who was part of the rap group 2 Live Crew, which had gained popularity in Miami, Florida. Hobbs said, "I knew Marquis from parties in Riverside. He would battle people and beat them senseless. I met him in the parking lot of a mall and told him if I ever get a chance, I'm going to bring you in." When one of the group members eventually departed, Ross flew to Florida to join 2 Live Crew alongside Hobbs, Christopher Wong Won (Fresh Kid Ice), and Luther Campbell (Luke).

When Ross arrived, they had already completed the 1986 single "Throw The D. And Ghetto Bass". The song "Throw The D" became the blueprint as to how future Miami bass songs were written and produced. The group was initially known for their sexually explicit and comical content. Regarding Ross's comedic talents and adaptation to the group's style, Hobbs noted, "he was always naturally funny. Since the stuff was coming off of comedy records, it went hand in hand with him."

Ross was 19-year when he joined, and said his first recording with the group was the song "Word".

In 1986, the 2 Live Crew release their Gold-certified debut album, The 2 Live Crew Is What We Are.

=== 1988–1991: Best selling 2 Live Crew albums and attendant controversy ===
In 1988, 2 Live Crew released their second studio album, Move Somethin'. The album was also certified Gold, as was the single "Move Somethin'". Move Somethin' peaked on the Billboard 200 charts at #68.

2 Live Crew's third studio album As Nasty As They Wanna Be (1989), became the group's biggest seller, certified Platinum by the Recording Industry Association of America. In 1990, the United States District Court for the Southern District of Florida ruled that the album was legally obscene; but this ruling was later overturned by the Eleventh Circuit. As Nasty As They Wanna Be was the first album in history to be deemed legally obscene.

In 1990, Ross and the 2 Live Crew released their fourth album Banned in the U.S.A., which was originally credited as Luther Campbell's solo album featuring 2 Live Crew and in later editions credited as a 2 Live Crew album. The album included the hits "Do the Bart" and the title track. It was also the very first release to bear the RIAA-standard Parental Advisory warning sticker. The eponymous title single was a reference to the obscenity decision from the U.S. District Court for the Southern District of Florida. Bruce Springsteen granted the group permission to interpolate his song "Born in the U.S.A." for the single.

Also in 1990, 2 Live Crew released Live in Concert, the group's only live album, and their fifth album overall. The album was released under the Effect label, a subsidiary label of Luke Records. The album peaked at #46 on the Top R&B/Hip-Hop Albums chart.

Sports Weekend: As Nasty as They Wanna Be, Pt. 2, the fifth studio album and sixth album overall by the 2 Live Crew was released in 1991 as a sequel of As Nasty As They Wanna Be. A clean version was also released entitled Sports Weekend: As Clean As They Wanna Be Part II and was the sequel of As Clean As They Wanna Be. Sports Weekend: As Nasty as They Wanna Be, Pt. 2 would be the final album released by the most well known line up 2 Live Crew members (Ross, Wong Won, Campbell and Hobbs).

=== 1992–2003: Subsequent 2 Live Crew success, featured rapper and solo project ===
After the group's separation, Ross relocated to Georgia, where he had friends and family. There, he ventured into stand-up comedy. Subsequently, Ross teamed up with Idrin Davis (DJ Toomp) to form the duo 2 Nasty.

In 1993, 2 Nazty released the album Indecent Exposure. When discussing the album, Ross explained his intention to showcase diversity while staying true to the style that had made him famous. Greg Baker of the Miami New Times praised the album, acknowledging that while some of the content might be offensive, he appreciated its diversity. Baker commented, "clever story lines and double-dope rhyme schemes are laid over skirt-flipping, ass-bumping beats as strong as any on the hip-hop market today." Regarding Ross's performance, Baker noted, "Marquis remains among the most charismatic of rap vocalists and contributes the "concepts" and many of the lyrics."

That same year, Ross appeared as a featured guest on Ice-T's album Home Invasion on a song named "99 Problems". Ice-T explained that the idea for the song "99 Problems" originated during a conversation about the single "Whoomp! (There It Is)" and its popularity in Magic City and that out of nowhere Ross said "Man, I got 99 problems, but a bitch ain't one". Ice-T felt it sounded right for a song's name, and once he made it, he invited Ross to do a verse. In 2003, a remake was made by Jay-Z and was a major hit.

In 1995, Ross, Wong Won and Hobbs would reunite to release the single "Hoochie Mama" for the soundtrack to the movie Friday. The soundtrack reached #1 on the Billboard 200 chart, where it held its position for two weeks, and on the Top R&B/Hip-Hop Albums chart for six weeks.

In 1996, Ross reunited with Wong Won and Hobbs under the 2 Live Crew banner to release the group's seventh studio album Shake a Lil' Somethin', whose eponymous single peaked at #11 on the Hot Rap Singles chart, The single "Do the Damn Thing" made it to #24 on the same chart, and "Be My Private Dancer" peaked at #34.

In 1998, Ross, along with Wong Won, released The Real One, the final 2 Live Crew album to date. The album's single "2 Live Party", featuring KC of KC and the Sunshine Band and Freak Nasty, peaked at #52 on the Hot R&B/Hip-Hop Songs chart and #9 on the Hot Rap Songs chart. The title single "The Real One", featuring Ice-T, peaked at #60 on the Hot R&B/Hip-Hop Songs and #9 on the Hot Rap Songs charts.

In 2003, Ross released a solo project named Bottom Boi Style Vol. 1.

=== 2006–2010: Reforming and reuniting with 2 Live Crew ===
During 2006–07 Ross and Wong Won met, discussed their differences, and ultimately decided to relaunch 2 Live Crew. The duo made offers to past members (notably, Hobbs and Campbell) to re-join the group, but the offers were declined.

In 2010, Ross and 2 Live Crew were honorees at the 2010 7th VH1 Hip-Hop Honors. In August, Wong Won and Ross announced the pending release of a 2 Live Crew album named Just Wanna Be Heard.

In late 2010, Ross and Wong Won released 2 Live Crew singles "I'm 2 Live" featuring rapper Mannie Fresh, "Cougar," and "Boom" featuring rapper E-40. The duo once again announced the pending release of the album Just Wanna Be Heard.

=== 2011–2024: Later projects ===
In 2011, Ross was a featured guest on the single "Steak & Mash Potatoes" by Chain Swangaz. A music video of the single featured Ross and Chain Swangaz as fast food employee who create havoc while their boss, played by Charlie Sheen, is gone.

In 2014, Ross and Wong Won released the single "Take It Off". Also, Wong Won and Ross made cameo appearances in the Flo Rida music video "G.D.F.R." That same year, the duo announced the pending release of a new 2 Live Crew studio album Turn Me On. Also that year, Wong Won and Ross reunited with Campbell for several performances.

In 2016, Wong Won left 2 Live Crew and died in 2017, Ross reunited with Hobbs to reform the group. The duo released the single One Horse Sleigh in 2016 and continued to tour nationally as 2 Live Crew, until 2024.

== Personal life and death ==
Ross was an avowed born again Christian, but also felt no moral restrictions when he performed sexually explicit lyrics in 2 Live Crew hits on tour or on recordings.

Ross had a daughter.

Ross died from a heart attack on June 3, 2024, at the age of 58, in his home in Gadsden, Alabama.

== Accolades ==
2010 – VH1 Hip-Hop Honors: The Dirty South Edition – Honoree

2019 – Yo ATL Raps – Lifetime Achievement Award
