= Hypno5ive =

American alternative music DJ

- Also known as: Nice & Nasty
- Born: Danny Robledo; Los Angeles, California, U.S.
- Genres: Electronic body music; Dark wave; Industrial music; Post-punk; Gothic rock
- Occupations: DJ, publisher, developer
- Years active: 1986–present
- Website: hypno5.com

Danny Robledo, better known as Hypno5ive or Hypno5 is an alternative music DJ, artist, promoter, designer and publisher of a music website of the same name that offers news and reviews focusing on industrial, ebm, darkwave, gothic, post-punk and alternative genres.

== Background ==
Hypno5ive has produced extensive promotional work for radio, video and club appearances including concert support for Depeche Mode, Nitzer Ebb, Nine Inch Nails, Meat Beat Manifesto, Ministry, Ramones, My Life with the Thrill Kill Kult, Gene Loves Jezebel, Front 242, Pankow, Skinny Puppy, Cat Rapes Dog, Vomito Negro, and local Miami industrial music bands Vociferous Mutes and Another Nation, which helped develop alternative music popularity in the region as well as draw national and international attention to the underground music environment in Miami. In addition to being a frequent contributor to many alternative press publications, he wrote and published his own alternative music reviews, including the music publication 220 Volts while living in Stockholm, Sweden.

In 1990, Hypno5ive founded the historic Edge in Kendall, Florida and helped give rise to the fledgling South Beach dance club scene of the time while promoting EBM and industrial music. Club work since the late 1980s has included: Club 1235, Club Nu's Backdoor, Church, Kitchen Club, Club Beirut, Jonestown, Cameo, Red Room, Another World, Hell's Kitchen, Institute, Noise Unit, Right Wing, The Catacombs at Power Studios, Thrashcan, DarkWave Club, Edge, and Marsbar.

Additional work included promotional studio remixes of Front 242 hits for Miami distributors as well as conceptual artwork on various alternative and industrial band albums.

In the mid 1990s, one of Marilyn Manson and the Spooky Kids' first self made promo tapes was discovered among his collection. This find was disputed by some fans as never existing. After an extensive debate by members of the web community and fans the Beaver Meat Cleaver Beat was sold to a collector in Japan.

Today Hypno5ive resides in NYC and besides the web publication, he works in web development and continues to DJ.

Hypno5ive creates the 120 Volts Mixcloud music collections featuring new and classic alternative, darkwave, ebm, electronic, goth, industrial, post-punk, and synth tracks.

== Early years ==
=== Nice & Nasty / Double Duce ===
The first exposure to being a DJ was in the late 1970s and early 1980s spinning Punk Rock and New Wave records as a mobile DJ for parties. Part of the inspiration to become a DJ came from listening to the University of Miami's WVUM 90.5 FM radio station.

Drawn to new styles of music, including early Hip Hop, Hypno5ive worked under the name Nice & Nasty during the early to mid 1980s. Working first as part of a duo with another DJ from New York and then on his own playing a role in a different styles of emerging music, Nice & Nasty became part of the Miami hip-hop / electro / Miami Bass movement. During the developmental years of hip-hop and bass in Miami, Nice & Nasty played at numerous events including jams at local parks, Video Powerhouse, Dade County Youth Fair, Calle Ocho festival, live mixes on air, and brought DJ battles and hip-hop shows to Key West, Florida showcasing local South Florida talent such as DJ Laz, MC Mighty Rock, MC Flex, and Beatmaster Clay-D.

Nice & Nasty was a performing member DJ of the group Double Duce on stage with MC Mighty Rock at concerts and recorded scratching effects at Henry Stone's (of TK Records fame) studio in Miami for Amos Larkins production of Double Duce's School Breakdown and later on Fresh Out the Box today considered among the early titles categorized as Proto-Bass contributing to the development of Miami Bass sound.

Working with Henry Stone, Paul Klein, and Larry Davis (Instant Funk) at Hot Productions record company in Miami, he continued marketing and promoting all of the studio's releases and acts including Gucci Crew II, L'Trimm, Bose, and comedy rap duo 2 Live Jews.

Nice & Nasty's major exposure as a DJ occurred at Miami's Skylight Express alongside Mohamed Moretta and then independently on weekly radio broadcasts live from the club at the height of the Miami bass popularity in the mid 1980s.

== Discography ==
Singles:

- 1985: School Breakdown (from DD-1004 12" Single) Double Duce Records
- 1987: Fresh Out The Box (from HAL-1224 12" Single) Boomtown Records

Compilations:

- 1987: Fresh Out The Box (on HTCD 3302-2, Jam On Bass Vol. 1) Hot Productions
- 2011: Miami Bass Throwdown (8 94231 18982 1) Essential Media Group

Mixtapes:

- 1987: Double Duce Live At The Crib
- 1987: Kraftwerk à la Nasty

Productions as Hypno5ive:

- 2006: Cult-like
- 2006: Better Killer
