= Back at Your Ass for the Nine-4 =

Studio album by The New 2 Live Crew
- Released: February 1, 1994
- Recorded: 1994
- Studio: Luke Recording Studio (Liberty City, FL)
- Genre: Hip hop; dirty rap; gangsta rap
- Length: 1:00:12
- Label: Luke Records
- Producer: Luke (exec.); 2 Live Crew; DJ Laz (add.); DJ Slice (add.); DJ Spin (add.); Felix Sama (add.); Mike Fresh (add.); Professor Griff (add.)

The New 2 Live Crew chronology
Deal with This (1993)	Back at Your Ass for the Nine-4 (1994)	Shake a Lil' Somethin' (1996)

Professional ratings
Review scores
Source	Rating
Allmusic	2/5 stars
Entertainment Weekly	B−

Back at Your Ass for the Nine-4 is the sixth studio album by American hip hop group 2 Live Crew. It was released on February 1, 1994, via Luke Records and was produced by Mike Fresh, DJ Slice, Professor Griff, DJ Spin Felix Sama & DJ Laz. The album became a moderate hit, peaking at #52 on the Billboard 200 and #9 on the Top R&B/Hip-Hop Albums. Two charting singles were produced, "Hell, Yeah" and "You Go Girl" who were both made into music videos. For this album the group was billed as the new 2 Live Crew as Brother Marquis and Mr. Mixx had left the group, the line-up for this album was Fresh Kid Ice, Luke and new member, Verb. It is the last 2 Live Crew album to feature Luke.

== Track listing ==
No.	Title	Length
1.	"Intro"	0:52
2.	"Dem a Talk"	3:53
3.	"Sex...Sex"	0:18
4.	"Hell, Yeah"	3:38
5.	"Ohhh"	0:18
6.	"Pussy and Dick Thing"	4:00
7.	"You Go Girl"	4:23
8.	"Joke's on You"	0:30
9.	"2 Live Freestyle"	3:06
10.	"We Want Some Pussy II"	3:00
11.	"Show Him"	0:16
12.	"The Initiation"	4:23
13.	"Fuck Nigga"	3:13
14.	"Suck Good Dick"	0:21
15.	"Suck My Dick"	4:47
16.	"Fuck 'Em" (Intro)	0:07
17.	"Fuck 'Em"	3:59
18.	"Work It"	0:41
19.	"Work That Pussy"	3:40
20.	"Pigs Fuckin"	0:16
21.	"Capt. Dick and Dolemite"	4:21
22.	"Drop Your Draws"	0:27
23.	"The Trick"	4:24
24.	"Mega Mix"	4:53
25.	"Yeah, Yeah" (DJ Spin Version)	3:38
26.	"Hell, Yeah" (DJ Spin Version)	3:40
Total length:		1:00:12

== Personnel ==
- Luther Campbell - performer, executive producer
- Christopher Wong Won - performer
- Larry Dobson - performer
- Gustavo Afont - bass guitar (tracks: 7, 10)
- Richard Griffin - programming (tracks: 2, 12, 23)
- Michael "Mike Fresh" McCray - programming (tracks: 4, 15)
- Anthony Walker - programming (tracks: 6, 7, 9, 13, 17, 21)
- Felix Sama - programming (tracks: 19, 24)
- Darren "DJ Spin" Rudnick - programming (track 19), remixing (tracks: 25, 26)
- Lazaro Mendez - programming (track 24)
- Eddie Miller - mixing
- Ted Stein - mixing
- Tommy Afont - mixing
- Anthony Mizell - design
- Ron Alston - photography
- Rudy Ray Moore - voice (tracks: 1, 3, 5, 14, 18, 21, 22)
- Louis "Don Ugly" Howard - additional vocals (track 2)
- Likkle Wicked - additional vocals (track 2)
- Live - additional vocals (track 7)
- Phat-Daddy - additional vocals (track 9)

== Charts ==
=== Weekly charts ===
Chart (1994)	Peak position
US Billboard 200	52
US Top R&B/Hip-Hop Albums (Billboard)	9

=== Year-end charts ===
Chart (1994)	Position
US Top R&B/Hip-Hop Albums (Billboard)	95
