= The Chinaman (album) =

Studio album by Fresh Kid Ice
- Released: July 15, 1992
- Studio: Luke (Liberty City, FL)
- Genre: Hip hop
- Producer: Fresh Kid Ice; Fat Daddy; Eddie Miller; Shake G DJ MadMan

Fresh Kid Ice chronology
The Chinaman (1992)	Still Nasty (2000)

Professional ratings
Review scores
Source	Rating
AllMusic	2/5 stars

The Chinaman is the first studio album by American rapper Fresh Kid Ice (Christopher Wong Won) of the 2 Live Crew. It was released on July 15, 1992, by Effect Records.

It reached number 38 on the Billboard Heatseekers Albums chart and No. 56 on the Top R&B/Hip-Hop Albums chart. The album was the first American hip hop album to embrace having an Asian heritage.

== Production ==
Wong Won said he took on the project in 1992, because he wanted to distanced himself from 2 Live Crew member Luther Campbell, who at the time had a beef with Dr. Dre and Snoop Dogg. He felt it was awkward and out of place since all previous interaction with them had been friendly, hence he suggested a solo project to his label, and started it without a budget. He also said, without taking an advance, all beats were programmed in his garage with friends and artists he produced, they went into the company's studio and recorded it and that it sold over 200,000 copies with very limited promotion. The singles were "Dick 'Em Down," "I'll Be There," and "Freak 'Em Down" (the clean version of "Dick 'Em Down").

== Charts ==
On the Billboard charts, the album peaked at No. 38 and stayed two weeks on the Heatseekers Albums chart. The Chinaman was also on the Top R&B/Hip-Hop Albums chart for ten weeks, peaking at No. 56.

== Legacy ==
The Chinaman is the first American hip hop album to embrace an Asian heritage. It inverts the stereotypes into prideful declarations of self-identity.

== Track listing ==
No.	Title	Length
1.	"Dick 'Em Down"	3:07
2.	"Pussy Ain't Shit"	3:00
3.	"Dance to the Rhythm"	3:40
4.	"From the Botton to da Top"	3:57
5.	"Long Dick Chinese"	2:42
6.	"Miami da Bottom"	4:20
7.	"I'll Be Here"	3:45
8.	"Kid Ice Groove"	3:20
9.	"Splak It Like You Like It"	2:48
10.	"Bad Boys Move in Silence"	5:25
11.	"Roll Call"	3:29
12.	"Demon"	3:40
13.	"Freestyle"	3:18
14.	"Madd-Mix"	5:00
15.	"Shot-Outs (Holla' at Me)"	3:17

== Personnel ==
- Executive producer: Luther Campbell
- Produced By: Fat Daddy and Fresh Kid Ice for Ice Cold Productions except "Demon" and "I'll Be Here" produced by Eddie Miller for Lecture On Nothing Production, "Roll Call" produced by Shake G, Fat Daddy and Fresh Kid Ice for Ice Cold Productions, "Kid Ice Groove" produced by DJ MadMan for Ice Cold Productions, and "Long Dick Chinese" produced by Shake G for Ice Cold Productions.
- All scratches by DJ MadMan and DJ Domain
- Additional vocals: "Roll Call" by Shake G and Fat Daddy, "Bad Boys Move In Silence" by Tesfa and Fat Daddy, "From The Botton To Da Top" by Fat Daddy, and "I'll Be Here" by GAME.
- Engineered and mixed by Eddie Miller at Luke Recording Studios, Liberty City, Fl.
- Mastered at Fullersounds Miami, Fl.
- Graphics by Milton Mizell
- Photography by Byron E. Small

== Charts ==
Chart (1992)	Peak position
US Heatseekers Albums (Billboard)	38
US Top R&B/Hip-Hop Albums (Billboard)	56
