= Shake a Lil' Somethin' =

Studio album by 2 Live Crew
- Released: August 6, 1996
- Recorded: 1996
- Studio: Criteria Studios (Miami, FL); K-Lou Studios (Richmond, CA); One Little Indian Studios (El Cerrito, CA)
- Genre: Hip hop; porn rap
- Length: 46:11
- Label: Lil' Joe Records
- Producer: Joseph Weinberger (exec.); Mr. Mixx

2 Live Crew chronology
Back at Your Ass for the Nine-4 (1994)	Shake a Lil' Somethin' (1996)	The Real One (1998)

Professional ratings
Review scores
Source	Rating
Allmusic	2.5/5 stars

Shake a Lil' Somethin' is the seventh studio album by American hip hop group 2 Live Crew. It was released on August 6, 1996, via Lil' Joe Records and was produced by Mr. Mixx. The album made it to #145 on the Billboard 200 and #33 on the Top R&B/Hip-Hop Albums and three singles: "Shake a Lil' Somethin'", which peaked at #11 on the Hot Rap Singles chart, "Do the Damn Thing", which made it to #24 on the same chart, and "Be My Private Dancer", which peaked at #34. At the time of this album, Fresh Kid Ice had left the New 2 Live Crew (which consisted of himself, Luther Campbell and Verb) and Luke Records to re-join original members Mr. Mixx and Brother Marquis. However, the reunion would be short lived as Mr. Mixx would leave the group after this album and Marquis would leave after the next album.

== Track listing ==
All music is composed by Mr. Mixx.

No.	Title	Writer(s)	Length
1.	"Intro"	D. Hobbs; M. Ross; C. Wong Won; L. Campbell	1:54
2.	"Shake a Lil' Somethin'"	D. Hobbs; M. Ross; C. Wong Won	3:59
3.	"Table Dance"	D. Hobbs; M. Ross; C. Wong Won	4:37
4.	"Bulldagger Stole My Bitch"	D. Hobbs; M. Ross	4:32
5.	"This Thing Is Huge"	D. Hobbs; M. Ross	0:09
6.	"When We Get Them Hoes"	D. Hobbs; M. Ross	3:35
7.	"Skeeta Man"	D. Hobbs; M. Ross	3:33
8.	"Savage in the Sack"	D. Hobbs; M. Ross	4:40
9.	"Be My Private Dancer"	D. Hobbs; M. Ross	3:30
10.	"My Dick"	D. Hobbs; M. Ross	0:15
11.	"Do the Damn Thang"	D. Hobbs; M. Ross	4:00
12.	"PSK'95"	D. Hobbs; M. Ross	5:02
13.	"Jam Session I"	D. Hobbs; C. Walker	3:44
14.	"Anotha Pussy Caper"	D. Hobbs; M. Ross	5:33
15.	"Mega Mixx"	D. Hobbs	3:11
16.	"Caper Reprise"	D. Hobbs; M. Ross	5:30
Total length:			46:11
