= Sports Weekend (As Nasty as They Wanna Be Part II) =

Studio album by 2 Live Crew
- Released: October 8, 1991
- Recorded: 1991
- Genres: Miami bass; porn rap
- Length: 64:41
- Labels: Luke/Atlantic Records; 91720
- Producer: David Hobbs

2 Live Crew chronology
Live in Concert (1990)	Sports Weekend (As Nasty as They Wanna Be Part II) (1991)	Deal with This (1993)

Singles from Sports Weekend (As Nasty as They Wanna Be Part II)
- 1. "Pop That Coochie" Released: August 30, 1991

Professional ratings
Review scores
Source	Rating
AllMusic	2.5/5 stars
The Encyclopedia of Popular Music	3/5 stars
Entertainment Weekly	D
The Rolling Stone Album Guide	3/5 stars

Sports Weekend (As Nasty as They Wanna Be Part II) is the fifth studio album by the American group 2 Live Crew, released in 1991. It is a sequel to As Nasty as They Wanna Be. A clean version was released later the same year titled Sports Weekend (As Clean as They Wanna Be Part II). It was the last studio album to include all of the original members of the 2 Live Crew.

Like As Nasty as They Wanna Be, the album was at times subject to obscenity charges, or pulled from record stores, due to complaints about its lyrics.

The album peaked at No. 22 on the Billboard 200. It has sold more than 500,000 copies.

== Production ==
The album was produced by group member Mr. Mixx.

== Critical reception ==
Entertainment Weekly wrote: "As nothing but unprintable titles, ugly gay-bashing, and spurious sexual boasting from guys who couldn’t get women if they weren’t in show biz, Sports Weekend might appeal to titillated 14-year-old boys who think this is what adulthood is like. Until they turn 15." The Baltimore Sun thought that the album "depends mostly on the sort of racy 'party music' raps the 2 Live Crew made before it got so infamous, all of them backed by an urgent, Miami-style electrobeat." The Orange County Register declared that "the Crew is still as boring as it wants to be."

== Track listing ==
1. "Intro" – 0:45
2. "Pop That Pussy" – 4:17
3. "For How Long" – 0:14
4. "A Fuck Is a Fuck" – 4:15
5. "Let It Rip" – 0:08
6. "Baby Baby Please (Just a Little More Head)" – 2:52
7. "Graveyard" – 0:21
8. "Ugly as Fuck" – 4:25
9. "A Hooker?" – 0:15
10. "Fraternity Joint" – 4:03
11. "Nigga's Comin' Up" – 0:06
12. "Here I Come" – 3:04
13. "I Like It, I Love It" – 3:39
14. "Fuck Off" – 0:33
15. "Mega Mix V" – 3:37
16. "Sweet Suzy" – 0:24
17. "Freaky Behavior" – 4:47
18. "12" Long" – 0:15
19. "Ain't No Pussy Like..." – 3:55
20. "You Are Very Erect" – 0:33
21. "Some Hot Head" – 3:59
22. "Chesterfield Island" – 0:43
23. "I Ain't Bullshittin' III" – 4:52
24. "Balls" – 0:32
25. "The Pussy Caper" – 5:35
26. "Up a Girl's Ass" – 0:20
27. "Who's Fuckin' Who" – 3:57
28. "Pussy (Reprise) For Those Who Like to Fuck" – 2:15
