= Move Somethin' (album) =

Studio album by 2 Live Crew
- Released: August 17, 1988
- Recorded: 1988
- Studios: Circle Sound Studios (Hollywood, Florida, U.S.)
- Genres: Miami bass; dirty rap
- Length: 40:02
- Label: Luke Records
- Producers: Luke Skyywalker (also exec.); 2 Live Crew

2 Live Crew chronology
The 2 Live Crew Is What We Are (1986)	Move Somethin' (1988)	As Nasty as They Wanna Be (1989)

Professional ratings
Review scores
Source	Rating
AllMusic	4/5 stars
The Rolling Stone Album Guide	2.5/5 stars

Move Somethin' is the second studio album by the American hip hop group 2 Live Crew. It was released on August 17, 1988, via Luke Records and was produced by Luke Skyywalker and Mr. Mixx. It was certified Gold by Recording Industry Association of America. The album improved on the charts from the previous album, making in to number 68 on the Billboard 200 and number 20 on the Top R&B/Hip Hop Albums chart. It contains the singles "Move Somethin'" and "Do Wah Diddy Diddy".

The album incorporates samples from such diverse sources as James Brown ("With Your Badself"), Manfred Mann ("Do Wah Diddy Diddy"), The Kinks ("One and One"), Yellow Magic Orchestra ("Mega-Mixx II"), Kraftwerk ("Drop the Bomb"), and Quadrant Six (the title track). On the song "Word II", 2 Live Crew's DJ Mr. Mixx scratches up Brian May's guitar solo (as well as the chorus) on "We Will Rock You" over the crowd stomp-and-clap beat, which was sampled from the same song. Its wide musical range is nonetheless all encompassed by the Miami bass sound, in its heavy Roland TR-808 kicks and fast percussion, and stamped with lyrics reflecting the group's sexually explicit humor.

== Track listing ==
No.	Title	Length
1.	"Introduction"	0:52
2.	"Drop The Bomb"	2:49
3.	"Move Somethin'"	3:26
4.	"Ghetto Bass II"	4:25
5.	"With Your Badself"	2:22
6.	"Pussy Ass Nigga"	3:17
7.	"H-B-C"	3:21
8.	"S & M"	3:51
9.	"Do Wah Diddy"	4:02
10.	"Word II"	3:10
11.	"Feel Alright Y'all"	2:55
12.	"One And One"	2:24
13.	"Mega-Mixx II"	3:08
Total length:		40:02

Samples

- Track 1 contains samples from "Introduction to the J.B.'s" by Fred Wesley & The J.B.'s (1973) and "Drop the Bomb" by Trouble Funk (1982)
- Track 2 contains samples from "Drop the Bomb" and "Pump Me Up" by Trouble Funk (1982), "Trans-Europe Express" by Kraftwerk (1977), "Get Up, Get Into It, Get Involved" by James Brown (1970), and "Rebel Without a Pause" by Public Enemy (1987)
- Track 3 contains samples from "Body Mechanic" by Quadrant Six (1982), "Slack Jawed Leroy" by Skillet & Leroy and LaWanda Page (1972), "Thermometer" by LaWanda Page (1972), "Pleasure Boys (Dance Mix)" by Visage (1982), "Romeo & Juliet" by Rudy Ray Moore (1988), "Goodly Soul" by Skillet & Leroy (1973)
- Track 4 contains samples from "Everlasting Bass" by Rodney-O & Joe Cooley (1988), "Ashley's Roachclip" by The Soul Searchers (1974), "Don't Tell It" by James Brown (1976), and "Breakthrough" by Isaac Hayes (1974)
- Track 5 contains samples from "Say It Loud, I'm Black and I'm Proud" and "Give It Up or Turnit a Loose" by James Brown (1968, 1969)
- Track 6 contains samples from "Cissy Strut" by The Meters (1969) and "It's Your Rock" by Fantasy Three (1983)
- Track 8 contains samples from "You Really Got Me" by The Kinks (1964), "Get Ready" by The Temptations, and "Calling All Freaks, Pt.1" by Tina Dixon (1974)
- Track 9 contains samples from "Do Wah Diddy Diddy" by Manfred Mann (1964)
- Track 10 contains samples from "We Will Rock You by Queen (1977) and "Rapp Will Never Die" by MC Shy D (1985)
- Track 11 contains samples from "Amen, Brother" by The Winstons (1969), "Devotion (Live)" by Earth, Wind & Fire (1975), "Frisco Disco" by Eastside Connection (1978), and "I Feel Like Dynamite" by King Floyd (1974)
- Track 12 contains samples from "All Day and All of the Night" by The Kinks (1964)
- Track 13 contains samples from "Firecracker" by Yellow Magic Orchestra (1978), "It's Great to Be Here" by The Jackson 5 (1971), "Take Me to the Mardi Gras" by Bob James (1975), "Apache" by Incredible Bongo Band (1973), "Rock the House (You'll Never Be)" by Pressure Drop (1983), "Bounce, Rock, Skate, Roll" by Vaughan Mason and Crew (1979), "I Like Funky Music" by Uncle Louie (1979), "Masters of the Scratch" by Master O.C. and Krazy Eddie (1984), "Dance to the Drummer's Beat" by Herman Kelly & Life (1978), and "Here We Go (Live at the Funhouse)" by Run-DMC (1985)

== Personnel ==
- Luther Roderick Campbell – performer, producer, executive producer
- Mark D. Ross – performer, producer
- Christopher Wong Won – performer, producer
- David P. Hobbs – performer, producer
- Melvin Bratton – additional vocals (track 6)
- Tolbert Bain – additional vocals (track 6)
- Michael Sterling – mixing
- Manny Morell – artwork & design
