= Lyrical Assault =

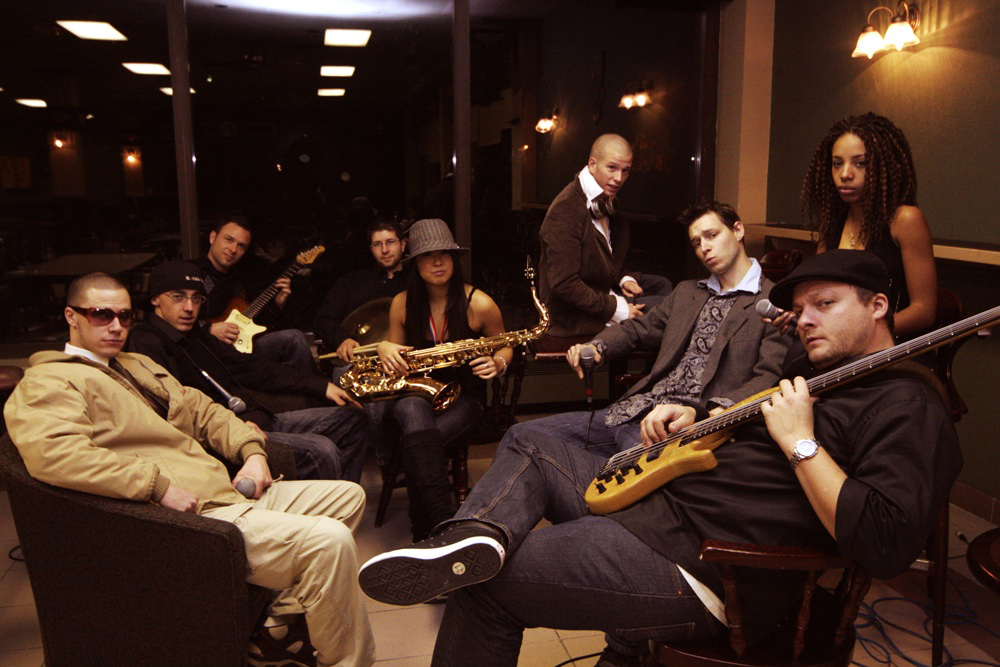
- Before the Global Battle of the Bands in London.

Background information
- Origin: Montreal, Quebec, Canada
- Genre: Hip-hop
- Years active: 2002–present
- Label: Far West Production
- Members: Arisa Safu (sax, guitar); Charles Alexi Masse (MC); Denis Langlois (trumpet, MC); Benoit Racine (bass); Thierry Séguin (Guitar); Marc-André Decelles (drums); Nicholas Legault (MC); Pierre-luc Fortin (DJ); Francois Thiffault (sax & flute)
- Website: lyricalassault.com

Lyrical Assault is a Canadian hip hop group, formed in 2002 in Montreal, Quebec.

== Biography ==
Since 2002, the circle of friends (COF) meets in the basement of Tolerance Zer0 (Nicholas Legault) in Vaudreuil-Dorion for freestyling and produces their own songs. The group became experimental in a new form of music called "Sproat Hop" and made its first performance in front of a live audience at the Sproat Hip Hop show in June 2002. They quickly made their place on the Sproat rap scene in Montreal and performed in local venues coveted by emerging groups such as Bourbon Street West, Manchester bar, Les Foufounes Électriques, the Alizé, Chez Maurice (featuring Muzion), Saints Showbar, Club Soda.

Meanwhile, members of the group also perform as a duo or solo, in competitions where they were finalists in all of the following contests: Urban Synergy 2005, Hip-hop 4Ever 2005, La Boom 2007.

== Contest ==
In November 2007, Lyrical Assault participates at the national final of the Global Battle of the Bands (GBOB) presented to the "Foufounes électriques", bringing eighteen bands from Quebec and Ontario. The Montreal formation won the first place, followed by the grand final of the international Global Battle of the Bands in London, where they represent Canada.

During the performance, eleven musicians on stage: Pierre-Luc Fortin (DJ Passan) DJ, Nicholas Legault (Zer0 Tolerance aka Nick Lucas) English MC, Denis Langlois (R-Tikk) French MC, Jean-Sebastien Baciu (J-Fresh) bass guitar, Alexis Arbour guitar, Alisa Charles vocals, Arisa Safu saxophone and guitar, Charles Alexi Masse (Charley Brown) Franch MC, Francois Thiffault (Horny Frank) soprano / tenor / bariton saxophone and western concert flute, Marc-André Decelles (MADD) drums.

== Discography ==
- 2007 : Funk for your trunk (DJ Passan et Zer0 Tolerance)
- 2006 : Make the speakers bleed (Tolerance et Charley Brown)
- 2006 : L'usine des rêves (R-Tikk with participation of DJ Passan)
- 2005 : Let it be known (Zer0 Tolerance)
- 2005 : Apex Mundi - Nouvelle génération
- 2004 : La Cave Vol.2 (compilation)
- 2004 : While you waiting LP
- 2004 : Let it be known EP (Zer0 Tolerance)
- 2003 : Apex Mundi - Nouvelle génération
- 2003 : Stricly Hip hop
- 2003 : The Zer0 Tolerance EP
