= The 2 Live Crew Is What We Are =

Studio album by 2 Live Crew
- Released: July 25, 1986
- Recorded: 1985–1986
- Studios: Sonic Sound International (Miami, FL); Studio One (Riverside, CA)
- Genres: Miami bass; electro; dirty rap
- Length: 32:55
- Label: Luke Records
- Producers: Luke Skyywalker; 2 Live Crew

2 Live Crew chronology
The 2 Live Crew Is What We Are (1986)	Move Somethin' (1988)

Professional ratings
Review scores
Source	Rating
AllMusic	4/5 stars
The Rolling Stone Album Guide	1.5/5 stars

The 2 Live Crew Is What We Are is the debut studio album by American hip-hop group the 2 Live Crew. It was released in 1986 on Luke Records to a great deal of controversy and promptly was certified gold by the RIAA. It includes the hits "We Want Some Pussy", "Throw the 'D'", and "Cuttin' It Up". In Florida, it was deemed obscene, and one store clerk was charged with felony "corruption of a minor" for selling it to a 14-year-old girl. The clerk was later acquitted.

The following year, the album reached number 24 on the Billboard Top R&B/Hip-Hop Albums chart and number 128 on the Billboard 200.

== Track listing ==
No.	Title	Length
1.	"2 Live Is What We Are..." (Word)	4:17
2.	"We Want Some Pussy"	2:49
3.	"Check It Out Yall" (Freestyle rappin')	5:03
4.	"Get It Girl"	3:55
5.	"Throw The 'D'"	3:09
6.	"Cut It Up"	3:49
7.	"Beat Box" (Remix)	4:32
8.	"Mr. Mixx On The Mix!!"	5:13
Total length:		32:55

Notes

- Track 1 contains samples from "Do It, Do It" by Disco Four (1981), "(Nothing Serious) Just Buggin'" by Whistle (1986), "Rapp Will Never Die" by MC Shy D (1985), and "Flick of the Switch" by AC/DC (1983)
- Track 3 contains samples from "Got to Be Real" by Cheryl Lynn (1978), and "Bass Machine" by T La Rock (1986)
- Track 4 contains samples from "Dance to the Drummer's Beat" by Herman Kelly & Life (1978), "Slack Jawed Leroy" by Skillet & Leroy and LaWanda Page (1972), "Hip Hop, Be Bop (Don't Stop)" by Man Parrish (1982), "Bongo Rock '73" by Incredible Bongo Band (1973), and dialogue from Dolemite
- Track 5 contains samples from "Dance to the Drummer's Beat" by Herman Kelly & Life (1978), "Bonus (A Side)" by Hashim (1983), "Change the Beat (Female Version)" by Beside (1982), and "Planet Rock" by Afrika Bambaataa & Soulsonic Force (1982)
- Track 6 contains samples from "Take Me to the Mardi Gras" by Bob James (1975), "It's a New Day So Let a Man Come in and Do the Popcorn" by James Brown (1971), "Release Yourself" by Aleem (1984), "AJ Scratch" by Kurtis Blow (1984), "Say What?" by Trouble Funk (1983), "You'll Like It Too" by Funkadelic (1981), "Jam on the Groove" by Ralph MacDonald (1976), "Planet Rock" by Afrika Bambaataa & Soulsonic Force (1982), and "Rock Box" by Run-DMC (1984)
- Track 7 contains samples from "Catch a Groove" by Juice (1976)
- Track 8 contains samples from "Apache" by Incredible Bongo Band (1973), "Change the Beat (Female Version)" by Beside (1982), "Theme From the Black Hole" by Parliament (1979), "Mirda Rock" by Reggie Griffin & Technofunk (1982), "Triple Threat" by Z-3 MC's (1985), "Bonus Lesson #1 - No Music (The Original Human Beat Box)" by Doug E. Fresh (1984), "Planet Rock" by Afrika Bambaataa & Soulsonic Force (1982), "Cavern" by Liquid Liquid (1983), "Buffalo Gals" by Malcolm McLaren (1982), "It's Yours" by T La Rock & Jazzy Jay (1984), "Spoonin' Rap" by Spoonie Gee (1979), "Al-Naafiysh (The Soul) (B-Side)" by Hashim (1983), and "Hold It Now, Hit It" by Beastie Boys (1986)

== Personnel ==
- Luther Campbell - performer, producer, executive producer, A&R
- Brother Marquis - performer, producer
- Fresh Kid Ice - performer, producer
- Mr. Mixx - performer, producer
- Bruce Greenspan - recording & mixing
- Mark Boccaccio - recording & mixing
- Manny Morell - artwork & design
- Bob Rosenberg - editor (track 7)
