= Do the Bart =

Single by 2 Live Crew

from the album Banned in the U.S.A.
- Released: February 6, 1991
- Recorded: 1990
- Genre: Miami bass; porn rap
- Length: 4:28
- Label: Luke Records
- Songwriter(s): Luther Campbell; David Hobbs; Marquis Ross; Christopher Wongwon
- Producer(s): Big Tony Fisher; Luther Campbell; Mike "Fresh" McCray; Mr. Mixx; Denver A. Wright

2 Live Crew singles chronology
"Mama Juanita" (1990)	"Do the Bart" (1991)	"Pop That Coochie" (1991)

"Do the Bart" is a single from 2 Live Crew from their album Banned in the U.S.A. It has relatively little profanity compared to most of their songs. The song is about a dance.

== Success ==
It reached No. 76 on the U.S. Billboard Hot R&B Singles chart. Unlike some of their other singles, especially "Me So Horny", "Do the Bart" had virtually no controversy.

== Music video ==
The music video, directed by Tas Salini, starts off with two men with Bart Simpson-style hairdos coming up saying they will "do the bart". The two men then do the dance they call the "Bart" and Fresh Kid Ice and Brother Marquis are shown rapping while women in swimsuits are shown dancing.

== Charts ==
Chart (1991)	Peak Position
U.S. Billboard Hot R&B Singles	76
