= The Real One =

Studio album by 2 Live Crew
- Released: April 7, 1998
- Recorded: 1998
- Genre: Hip hop
- Length: 1:10:00
- Label: Lil' Joe Records
- Producer: Joseph Weinberger (exec.); Disco Rick; Beat Master Clay D.; DJ Spin; Mike "Fresh" McCray; Brother Marquis; Fresh Kid Ice

2 Live Crew chronology
Shake a Lil' Somethin' (1996)	The Real One (1998)

Professional ratings
Review scores
Source	Rating
Allmusic	2/5 stars

The Real One is the eighth and final studio album by American hip hop group 2 Live Crew. It was released on April 7, 1998, via Lil' Joe Records and, with the absence of Mr. Mixx, was produced by various producers. The album peaked at #59 on the Top R&B/Hip-Hop Albums. By the time of this album, Mr. Mixx had again left the group and shortly after the release of this album, Brother Marquis left as well.

Its single "2 Live Party" featuring KC of KC and the Sunshine Band and Freak Nasty peaked at #52 on the Hot R&B/Hip-Hop Songs and #9 on the Hot Rap Songs, and title single "The Real One" featuring Ice-T peaked at #60 on the Hot R&B/Hip-Hop Songs and #9 on the Hot Rap Songs.

== Track listing ==
No.	Title	Length
1.	"Intro"	1:57
2.	"2 Live Is Here"	3:39
3.	"2 Live Party" (featuring KC & Freak Nasty)	3:06
4.	"Freaks Inherit the Earth"	0:31
5.	"Freak Ho"	4:02
6.	"Take It Off"	3:30
7.	"Don't Get Busted by a Texas Ranger"	0:48
8.	"Bottle and a Blunt" (featuring Luniz)	4:28
9.	"The Real One" (featuring Ice-T)	4:18
10.	"Come on, Get Up and Dance"	4:19
11.	"Shake Your Pants"	3:52
12.	"Playa Hatas"	3:46
13.	"Bring That Money to Me"	3:58
14.	"Raise the Roof"	3:20
15.	"It's Time"	3:15
16.	"World Famous"	3:51
17.	"Show You a Shot"	3:40
18.	"On Top of Ol' Rachelle"	0:40
19.	"Call Me"	3:34
20.	"Ay Papi"	2:55
21.	"Ride with Me (Bottom Style)" (featuring Rufftown Mob)	6:31
Total length:		1:10:00

== Personnel ==
- Christopher Wong Won - performer, producer
- Mark D. Ross - performer, producer
- Joseph Weinberger - executive producer
- Eric Timmons - performer (track 3)
- Harry Wayne Casey - performer (track 3)
- Jerold Dwight Ellis III - performer (track 8)
- Garrick Demond Husbands - performer (track 8)
- Tracy Lauren Marrow - performer (track 9)
- Larry Dobson - performer (track 14)
- Madball of Rufftown Mob - performer (track 21)
- Uzi of Rufftown Mob - performer (track 21)
- Luis Garcia - artwork
- Clay "Beatmaster" Dixon - producer
- Michael "Mike Fresh" McCray - producer
- "Disco" Rick Taylor - producer
- Darren "DJ Spin" Rudnick - producer

== Charts ==
Album

Chart (1998)	Peak position
US Billboard Top R&B Albums	59

Singles

Year	Song	Peak positions	
Year	Song	US R&B	US Rap
1998	"2 Live Party"	52	9
1998	"The Real One"	60	9
