= 2 Live Crew =

American hip hop group

The 2 Live Crew
- Promotional shoot, c. 1989, of the most well known lineup of the group. From left to right Fresh Kid Ice, Mr. Mixx, Brother Marquis, and Luke.

Background information
- Origin: Miami, Florida, U.S.
- Genres: Hip hop; Miami bass; dirty rap
- Works: Discography
- Years active: 1984–1998; 2009–present
- Labels: Fresh Beat; Macola; Luke; Lil Joe; Priority; Effect
- Members: Mr. Mixx
- Past members: Fresh Kid Ice; Brother Marquis; Luke; Amazing Vee; Verb

2 Live Crew is an American hip-hop group from Miami, Florida, formed in 1984. The group was originally composed of DJ Mr. Mixx (David Hobbs), Fresh Kid Ice (Christopher Wong Won), and Amazing Vee (Yuri Vielot). However, its most well-known lineup emerged later with the addition of Brother Marquis (Mark Ross) and the replacement of Amazing Vee by Luther "Luke Skyywalker" Campbell, who also served as the group's manager and promoter. Known for their provocative lyrics and sexually explicit content, 2 Live Crew gained widespread attention in the late 1980s and early 1990s, becoming pioneers of the Miami bass genre and influential figures in the development of Southern hip hop. Their breakthrough album, The 2 Live Crew Is What We Are (1986), introduced their signature sound, blending booming basslines with humorous and risqué themes.

The group achieved both commercial success and controversy with their 1989 album, As Nasty As They Wanna Be, which was certified double platinum by the Recording Industry Association of America (RIAA) and featured the hit single "Me So Horny." The album's explicit content led to legal battles over obscenity, most notably when it was declared legally obscene by a federal judge in 1990—an unprecedented ruling for a music recording in the United States. This decision sparked a high-profile First Amendment case, eventually overturned by the United States Court of Appeals for the Eleventh Circuit in 1992, cementing the group's legacy as defenders of free expression in music. Despite lineup changes and legal challenges, 2 Live Crew continued to release albums, including Banned in the U.S.A. (1990), the first album to bear a Parental Advisory label, and remained active until their official disbandment in 2016 following the death of Fresh Kid Ice in 2017. The group's influence endures in hip hop culture, particularly for their role in pushing boundaries of artistic freedom and popularizing bass-heavy production.

== History ==
=== 1984–1986: Group formation and breakthrough ===
The 2 Live Crew, although seen as a main fixture in the Miami hip-hop scene, actually got their start in Riverside, California and was created by DJ Mr. Mixx (David Hobbs) with fellow rappers Fresh Kid Ice (Chris Wong Won), and Amazing Vee (Yuri Vielot).

The group released its first single, "Revelation", on its own label "Fresh Beat Records" in 1984. The A-side of "Revelation" contained a song where the only rapper featured was Amazing Vee. The B-side contained a song named "2 Live" where Fresh Kid Ice was the only rapper featured. "Revelation" was popular in Florida. Luke Skyywalker (Luther Campbell), who at the time was a local DJ and promoter, invited The 2 Live Crew to relocate to Miami. Also due to the subsequent success of 2 Live Crew, this made Fresh Kid Ice the first rapper to be noted in Asian American hip hop, and the first Asian rapper to gain renown.

For their second single, "What I Like" (1985), Fresh Kid Ice was the only rapper featured. Amazing Vee was only credited as writer, and left the group shortly after.

The single "Throw The D", released in January 1986, was a permanent blueprint for future Miami bass songs. Wong Won said that the song came about when they noticed a new popular dance in Miami called "Throwing The Dick" when the Herman Kelly and Life's song "Dance to the Drummer's Beat" played. The dance consisted of men throwing their hips back and forth, while the girls would squat with their hands on their knees, bend over, and shake their butt. Wong Won suggested to Mr. Mixx that they should adapt the hook, and they scratched it into the song. Wong Won felt his voice was too high pitched for the hook, so Mr. Mixx who came up with the pattern did it using an emulator. Wong Won wrote the lyrics in 20 minutes on a plane ride. Finally, they booked a 16-track studio to record it.

Rapper Brother Marquis (Mark Ross) joined The 2 Live Crew. Luke Skyywalker (Luther Campbell) gave The 2 Live Crew a record deal and worked as the group's manager. He also joined the group as its hype-man and spokesperson in their subsequent controversies.

The 2 Live Crew's debut album, The 2 Live Crew Is What We Are, was released in 1986. Alex Henderson of AllMusic commented that the album "did take sexually explicit rap lyrics to a new level of nastiness", with tracks such as "We Want Some Pussy" and "Throw the 'D'". With word-of-mouth attention, the album was certified gold by the Recording Industry Association of America (RIAA). Bob Rosenberg of Will to Power remixed "Beat Box" (originally released as "Two Live") and was billed "King of Edits" by Luke Skyywalker. In 1987, a Florida store clerk was acquitted of felony charges for selling the album to a 14-year-old girl.

=== 1988–1998: Best selling albums and controversy ===
In 1988, the group released their second album, Move Somethin' It was certified Gold and featured the singles "Move Somethin'" and "Do Wah Diddy Diddy". The album improved on the charts from the previous album, making in to No. 68 on the Billboard 200 and No. 20 on the Top R&B/Hip Hop Albums chart.

Campbell decided to sell a separate clean version in addition to the explicit version of the album, Move Somethin' (1988), produced by Mr. Mixx. A record store clerk in Alexander City, Alabama, was cited for selling a copy to an undercover police officer in 1988. It was the first time in the United States that a record store owner was held liable for obscenity over music, though the store was eventually acquitted.

In 1989, the group released their third album, As Nasty as They Wanna Be, which also became the group's most successful album. A large part of its success was due to the single "Me So Horny", which was popular locally with heavy radio rotation on Miami's WPOW-Power 96 FM. The American Family Association (AFA) did not think the presence of a "Parental Advisory" sticker was enough to adequately warn listeners of what was inside the case. Jack Thompson, a lawyer affiliated with the AFA, met with Florida Governor Bob Martinez and convinced him to look into the album to see if it met the legal classification of obscenity. In 1990, action was taken at the local level and Nick Navarro, Broward County Sheriff, received a ruling from County Circuit Court judge Mel Grossman that probable cause for obscenity violations existed. In response, Luther Campbell maintained that people should focus on issues relating to hunger and poverty rather than on the lyrical content of their music.

Navarro warned record store owners that selling the album might be prosecutable. 2 Live Crew then filed a suit against Navarro. That June, U.S. district court Judge Jose Gonzalez ruled the album obscene and illegal to sell. Charles Freeman, a local retailer, was arrested two days later, after selling a copy to an undercover police officer. This was followed by the arrest of three members of 2 Live Crew after they performed the As Nasty as They Wanna Be album at Club Futura in Hollywood, Florida, hosted by radio personality Tony the Tiger (Ira Wolf) from Power 96 FM, one of the few radio stations in the U.S. that continued airplay while the trial ensued. After international exposure with support from freedom of speech advocates like SCREW magazine's Al Goldstein (who owned a house in Broward County) and many others, they were acquitted soon after, as professor Henry Louis Gates, Jr. testified at their trial in defense of their lyrics. Freeman's conviction was overturned on appeal as well.

"A lot of people have gotten the impression that I'm this rude, sexual deviant or something," Campbell told journalist Chuck Philips. "But contrary to what has been printed about me in the papers, I'm no moral threat to anybody. I'm just a hard-working guy marketing a new product."

The Crew parodied Roy Orbison's "Oh, Pretty Woman" on the album As Clean as They Wanna Be. The copyright owners of the original song brought a lawsuit in 1990 claiming copyright infringement. In 1994, the United States Supreme Court unanimously adopted a rule from an earlier Ninth Circuit case involving Rick Dees, and ruled that the 2 Live Crew's parody was fair use, and thus did not infringe.

In 1992, the United States Court of Appeals for the Eleventh Circuit overturned the obscenity ruling from Judge Gonzalez, and the Supreme Court of the United States refused to hear Broward County's appeal. As in the Freeman case, Gates testified on behalf of 2 Live Crew, arguing that the material that the county alleged was profane actually had important roots in African-American vernacular, games, and literary traditions and should be protected.

As a result of the controversy, sales of As Nasty as They Wanna Be remained brisk, selling over two million copies. It peaked at number 29 on the Billboard 200 and number 3 on the Top R&B/Hip-Hop Albums chart. A few other retailers were later arrested for selling it as well, including Canadian Marc Emery, who was convicted in Ontario in 1991, and later gained fame as a marijuana activist. Later, hard-rock band Van Halen sued the group over an uncleared sample of their song "Ain't Talkin' 'Bout Love" in the 2 Live Crew song "The Fuck Shop". The publicity then continued when George Lucas, owner of the Star Wars universe, successfully sued Campbell for appropriating the name "Skywalker" for his record label, Luke Skyywalker Records. Campbell changed his stage name to Luke (and changed the record label's name to Luke Records) and the group released an extremely political follow-up album, Banned in the U.S.A., after obtaining permission to use an interpolation of Bruce Springsteen's "Born in the U.S.A.".

Banned in the U.S.A. was the group's fourth album. It was originally credited as Luke's solo album. The certified Gold album included the hits "Do the Bart" and the title track. It was also the first release to bear the RIAA-standard Parental Advisory warning sticker. The eponymous title single is a reference to the decision in a court case that its album, As Nasty as They Wanna Be, was obscene (the decision was overturned on appeal).

Displeased over the decision of Florida Governor Bob Martinez who, upon being asked to examine the album, decided it was obscene and recommended local law enforcement take action against it and over the subsequent action of Broward County, Florida, Sheriff Nick Navarro, who arrested local record-store owners on obscenity charges for selling the group's albums and the subsequent arrest of members of the group on obscenity charges, the group included the song "Fuck Martinez", which also includes multiple repetitions of the phrase, "fuck Navarro". The group found two other men with the same names, and had them sign releases, as they thought that this action would make it impossible for Martinez or Navarro to sue them.

Live in Concert (1990) was their fifth album. This was 2 Live Crew's first and only live album, and was also the only 2 Live Crew release under the Effect subsidiary label of Luke Records, a move that was deemed necessary for the company to be able to release additional 2 Live Crew material outside of their distribution deal with Atlantic Records, which was signed in 1990 – the same year they released Banned in the U.S.A.

Sports Weekend: As Nasty as They Wanna Be, Pt. 2 was their sixth album. Released in 1991, it is the sequel of As Nasty as They Wanna Be. A clean version was released later that same year titled, Sports Weekend: As Clean as They Wanna Be Part II. This was the last studio album by all original members of the 2 Live Crew. It contains the successful single "Pop That Pussy". The album was certified a gold record.

From that point on, all the releases by 2 Live Crew would always vary, having one or two members of the original lineup missing, with the exception of Fresh Kid Ice.

In 1994, Back at Your Ass for the Nine-4 was released. This album the group was billed as "The New 2 Live Crew" as Brother Marquis and Mr. Mixx had left the group, the lineup for this album was Fresh Kid Ice, Luke and new member, Verb. It is the last album with the 2 Live Crew banner to feature Campbell. The album became a moderate hit, peaking at No. 52 on the Billboard 200 and No. 9 on the Top R&B/Hip-Hop Albums. Two charting singles were produced, "Hell, Yeah" and "You Go Girl" who were both made into music videos.

1995 saw a reunion of Fresh Kid Ice, Brother Marquis and Mr. Mixx re-formed again to record "Hoochie Mama" for the soundtrack of movie Friday. The soundtrack reached No. 1 on the Billboard 200, where it held the position for two weeks, and the Top R&B/Hip-Hop Albums chart for six weeks.

Fresh Kid Ice, Mr. Mixx, and Brother Marquis left Luke and Luke Records to go to Lil' Joe Records and released Shake a Lil' Somethin' (1996) without Luther Campbell. Shake a Lil' Somethin' is their seventh album. It was released on August 6, 1996, for Lil' Joe Records and was produced by Mr. Mixx. The album made it to No. 145 on the Billboard 200 and No. 33 on the Top R&B/Hip-Hop Albums and two singles "Shake a Lil' Somethin'", which peaked at No. 11 on the Hot Rap Singles chart and "Do the Damn Thing", which reached No. 24 on the same chart. It peaked at number 59 on the Top R&B/Hip-Hop and albums chart. At the time of this album, Fresh Kid Ice had left the New 2 Live Crew (which consisted of himself, Luke and Verb and Luke Records) to re-join original members Mr. Mixx and Brother Marquis. However, the reunion was short lived as Mr. Mixx left the group after this album.

The Real One is their eighth and last studio album. It was released on April 7, 1998, for Lil' Joe Records and with the absence of Mr. Mixx, was produced by various producers. The album peaked at No. 59 on the Top R&B/Hip-Hop Albums. Shortly after the release of this album, Brother Marquis left as well.

=== 2000–2009: Hiatus and reformation ===
In the early 2000s, both Brother Marquis and Fresh Kid Ice pursued solo projects.

Circa 2006–2007 Fresh Kid Ice and Brother Marquis discussed their differences and decided to relaunch 2 Live Crew. They offered other past members to be involved but were declined. Both of them started to tour and release singles.

=== 2010–present: Honors, death of Fresh Kid Ice, new lawsuit, and death of Brother Marquis ===
In 2010, Brother Marquis and Fresh Kid Ice briefly reunited with Luke, and Mr. Mixx as they were honorees winners at the 2010 VH1 Hip-Hop Honors: The Dirty South Edition.

Later that year, the both of them released the singles "I'm 2 Live" featuring Mannie Fresh, "Cougar", "Boom" featuring E-40. They announced the release of a new 2 Live Crew album called Just Wanna be Heard with guest Too Short, E-40, and Insane Clown Posse. It was set to be released in August 2010, but remains unreleased to this day.

In June 2014, the 2 Live Crew released a new single, "Take It Off", the video clip featured cameos by Mannie Fresh, Flavor Flav, Trina, Flo Rida, and Trick Daddy. The single is available on iTunes Later that year they made a cameo in the Flo Rida music video "G.D.F.R.".

Also in 2014, they announced an album called Turn Me On, which also remains unreleased. By Thanksgiving of that year, 2 Live Crew reunited with Campbell for a series of shows until 2015.

In 2016, Fresh Kid Ice left the group, and Mr. Mixx rejoined.

On July 13, 2017, at age 53, Fresh Kid Ice died in a Miami hospital from cirrhosis.

Currently, there is an ongoing dispute between Lil Joe Records against former 2 Live Crew member Luther Campbell, Brother Marquis and the estate of Fresh Kid Ice. The central issue revolves around whether bankruptcy proceedings from the 1990s affect the group members' rights to reclaim copyrights to their old recordings. Lil Joe Records claims the bankruptcy proceedings extinguished these rights, while 2 Live Crew argues that copyright law overrules the bankruptcy order, protecting creators. Additionally, the debate includes whether the recordings were created under work-for-hire agreements, with Lil Joe Records asserting they were. This case may establish a precedent regarding the impact of past bankruptcy proceedings on artists' termination rights, with both parties seeking a favorable summary judgment from the court. The United States 11th Circuit Court of appeals held on June 2, 2026 that Li’ Joe records retains the sound recording copyrights to the albums. The eleventh circuit denied a rehearing of this decision and the entire 11th circuit court of appeals refused to rehear the decision as not one member of the court of appeals felt that the case should be reheard.

On June 3, 2024, Brother Marquis was found dead, at the age of 58.

== Discography ==
- The 2 Live Crew Is What We Are (1986)
- Move Somethin' (1988)
- As Nasty as They Wanna Be (1989)
- Banned in the U.S.A. (1990)
- Sports Weekend: As Nasty as They Wanna Be, Pt. 2 (1991)
- Back at Your Ass for the Nine-4 (1994)
- Shake a Lil' Somethin' (1996)
- The Real One (1998)
