= Parental Advisory =

Warning label

The current Parental Advisory warning label, introduced in 1996.

Parental Advisory (short for Parental Advisory: Explicit Content/Lyrics) is a warning label placed on audio recordings that contain explicit content. It was introduced by the Recording Industry Association of America (RIAA) in 1990 and adopted by the British Phonographic Industry (BPI) in 2011. The label was first affixed on physical 33⅓ rpm records, compact discs, and cassette tapes, and it has been included on digital listings offered by online music stores. In PAL-region territories, some video games featuring licensed music were labeled as such in the late 1990s and early 2000s.

The label was created in response to the efforts of the Parents Music Resource Center (PMRC) to highlight songs with unsuitable content. The Recording Industry Association of America (RIAA) responded by introducing an early version of their content warning label, although the PMRC was displeased and proposed that a music rating system structured like the Motion Picture Association of America film rating system be enacted. The RIAA alternatively suggested using a warning label reading "Parental Guidance: Explicit Lyrics", and after continued conflict between the organizations, the matter was discussed on September 19, 1985, during a hearing with the United States Senate Committee on Commerce, Science, and Transportation. Approximately two months after the hearing, the organizations agreed on a settlement in which audio recordings were to either be affixed with a warning label reading "Explicit Lyrics: Parental Advisory" or have their lyrics attached on the backside of their packaging.

Recordings with the Parental Advisory label are often released alongside a censored version that reduces, eliminates or replaces the objectionable material. Some retailers will distribute both versions of the product, while other sellers offer the amended pressing as their main option and choose not to distribute the explicit counterpart. The label has been widely criticized as ineffective in limiting the inappropriate material to which young audiences are exposed.

== Background ==
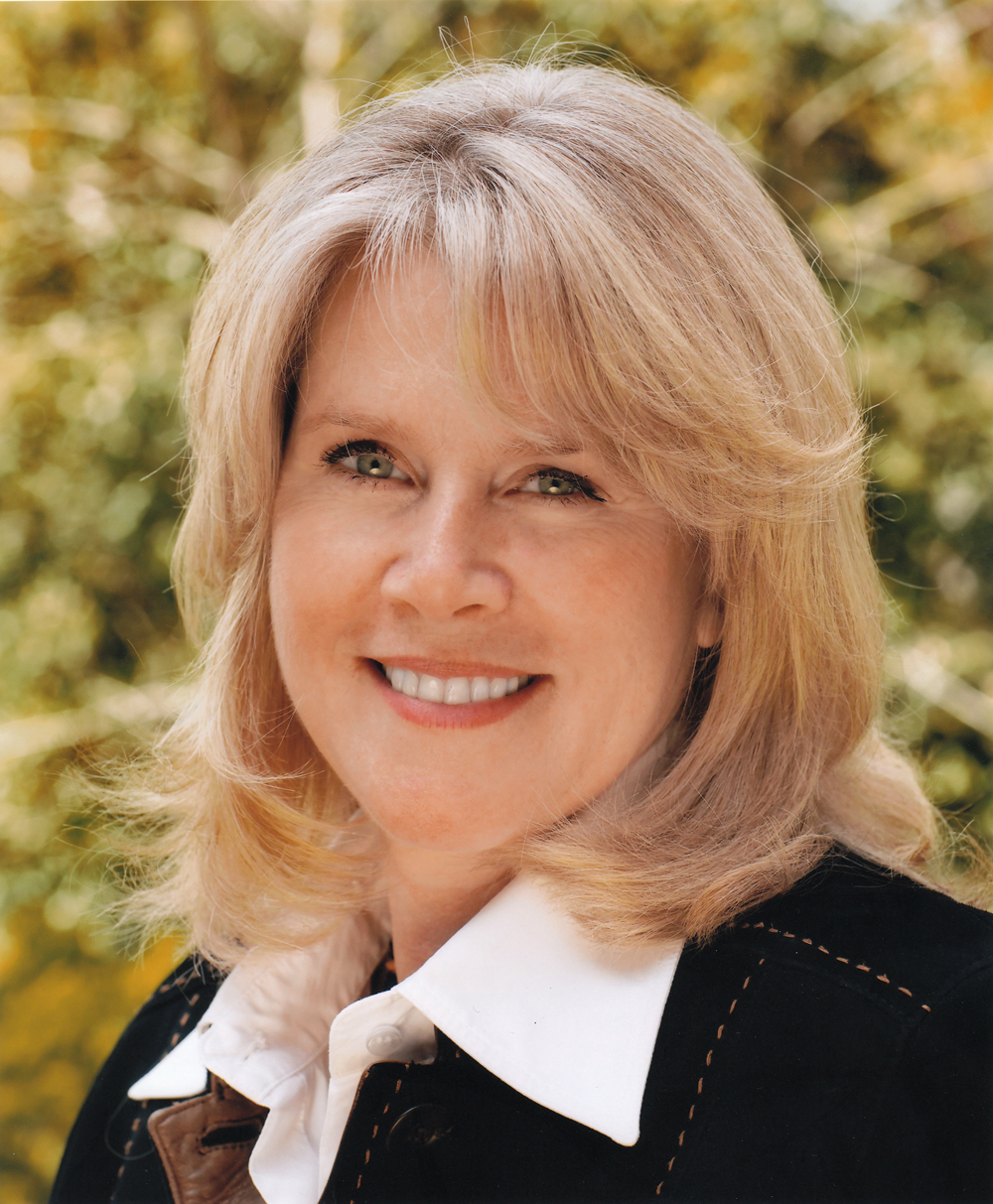
Tipper Gore in 2009

Shortly after their formation in April 1985, the Parents Music Resource Center (PMRC) assembled a list of fifteen songs deemed unsuitable content. Particular criticism was placed on "Darling Nikki" by Prince, after PMRC co-founder Mary "Tipper" Gore bought the album Purple Rain for her 11-year-old daughter Karenna, unaware that the song's lyrics included an explicit mention of masturbation. The Recording Industry Association of America (RIAA) responded by introducing an early version of their content warning label, although the PMRC was displeased and proposed that a music rating system structured like the Motion Picture Association of America film rating system be enacted. The RIAA alternatively suggested using a warning label reading "Parental Guidance: Explicit Lyrics", and after continued conflict between the organizations, the matter was discussed on September 19 during a hearing with the United States Senate Committee on Commerce, Science, and Transportation. Notable musicians Frank Zappa, Dee Snider, and John Denver each testified at this hearing with strong opposition to PMRC's warning label system, and censorship in general. Approximately two months after the hearing, the organizations agreed on a settlement in which audio recordings were to either be affixed with a warning label reading "Explicit Lyrics: Parental Advisory" or have its lyrics attached on the backside of its packaging.

In 1990, the now standard black-and-white warning label design reading "Parental Advisory: Explicit Lyrics" was introduced and was to be placed on the bottom right-hand section of a given product. The final design for the label came from graphic designer Deborah Norcross (working for Warner Bros), who says that despite all the major record labels being asked to submit potential designs, she was the only one to actually do so. The first album to bear the "black and white" Parental Advisory label was the 1990 release of Banned in the U.S.A. by the rap group 2 Live Crew.

By May 1992, approximately 225 records had been marked with the warning. In response to later hearings in the following years, it was reworded as "Parental Advisory: Explicit Content" in 1996. The system went unchanged until 2002, when record labels affiliated with Bertelsmann began including specific areas of concern including "strong language", "violent content", or "sexual content" on compact discs alongside the generic Parental Advisory label. Under director general Andrew Yeates, the British Phonographic Industry (BPI) introduced Parental Advisory stickers to the United Kingdom in 1995. In 2002, the BPI initiated a campaign in British retailers, employing 5,000 posters and 10,000 CD-sized information cards, to raise consumer awareness of the sticker and its purpose. The Parental Advisory label was first used on music streaming services and online music stores in 2011. That year, the BPI revised its own music censorship policies to incorporate more prominent usage of the warning label.

== Application ==
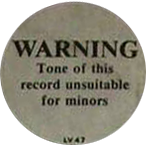
An earlier version of a warning label, used during the 1980s.

The "Parental Advisory Label Program" in the United States and the "Parental Advisory Scheme" in the United Kingdom lack agreed-upon standards for using the warning label, although they provide guidelines for its recommended inclusion. Although the label is not required by law, the RIAA suggests that the Parental Advisory label holds strong language or depictions of violence, sex, or substance abuse. The BPI additionally requests that "racist, homophobic, misogynistic or other discriminatory language or behavior" be taken under consideration when determining the appropriateness of a record.

Example of a music album cover with Parental Advisory warning label (Nonnegative by Coldrain).

Physical copies of albums which have the label generally have it as a permanent part of the artwork, being printed with the rest of the cover. In some cases, the label is affixed as a sticker to the front of the case, which can be removed by putting the artwork in a different case. Audio recordings that include Parental Advisory labels in their original formats are generally released in censored versions that reduce or eliminate the questionable material. They are recognized as "clean" editions by the RIAA, and are left unlabeled in their revised formats. Target has sold both versions of a given record. Walmart and their affiliated properties are well known for only carrying censored versions of records; in one instance, the retailer refused to distribute Green Day's 2009 album 21st Century Breakdown because they were not given the "clean" copies that they requested. However, Walmart has offered non-stickered copies of the Guns N' Roses album Appetite for Destruction, which are no different from their stickered counterparts except for the removal of controversial artwork from the cover booklet. Online music stores, including the iTunes Store, generally have the Parental Advisory logo embedded into digital files. Digital retailers and streaming services such as iTunes, Spotify, and Amazon Music flag tracks as 'Explicit' if they have been identified as such.

== Impact ==
Since its introduction, the effectiveness of the Parental Advisory label has frequently been called into question. Jon Wiederhorn from MTV News suggested that artists benefited from the label and noted that younger customers interested in explicit content could more easily find it with a label attached. On behalf of Westword, Andy Thomas said that the label was purposeless on the grounds that a young customer "would get a copy of the album sooner or later from a friend or another lethargic record store clerk" like the cashier that sold him a labeled pressing of La Sexorcisto: Devil Music, Vol. 1 (1992) by White Zombie in his childhood. He noted that its intended reaction in parents was varied; his lax mother was indifferent towards the warning, while the stricter mother of his companion did not allow her child to listen to the record.

The former design for the Parental Advisory label used during the 1990s. This logo also co-existed with the current label from 1996 to 2001.

Danny Goldberg from Gold Village Entertainment opined that the Parental Advisory label offered minimal value other than "being a way for certain retailers like Wal-Mart to brand themselves as 'family friendly'"; he felt that children were successful in getting content they desired "even before the Internet", and believed that the label had little impact on sales figures. In contrast, the RIAA maintains that "it's not a PAL Notice that kids look for, it's the music". They stated that research they had gathered revealed that "kids put limited weight on lyrics in deciding which music they like, caring more about rhythm and melody" and implied that the label is not a deciding factor for a given purchase. Tom Cole from NPR commented that the Parental Advisory label has become "a fact of music-buying life", which made it difficult for current consumers to understand the widespread controversy that came about from its introduction. Greg Beato of Reason observed that by the 1990s, "A hip-hop album that didn't warrant a Tipper sticker was artistically suspect."

The label has become well known enough to be parodied. Guns N' Roses's 1991 albums Use Your Illusion I and Use Your Illusion II included a similarly styled sticker saying "This album contains language which some listeners may find objectionable. They can F!?* OFF and buy something from the New Age section."

== Edited counterparts ==
It is fairly common for an album which received the Parental Advisory seal to be sold alongside an "edited" version which removes objectionable content, usually to the same level as a radio edit. The RIAA Guidelines however state "an Edited Version need not remove all potentially objectionable content from the sound recording." These albums are packaged nearly-identically to their explicit counterparts, usually with the only indicator being the lack of Parental Advisory seal, although if the artwork is deemed 'explicit' too, it will normally be censored. In the case of some albums, a black box reading "EDITED VERSION" is placed where the Parental Advisory seal would be. This was part of new guidelines introduced on April 1, 2002, which also included a label that featured "Edited Version Also Available" next to the Parental Advisory seal.

== See also ==
- Parents Music Resource Center
- Recording Industry Association of America
- MPA film rating system (movie audience suitability: G/PG/PG-13/R/NC-17)
- Content rating
- British Phonographic Industry
