= Dirty rap =

Subgenre of hip hop music that contains heavy explicit lyrics

- Other names: Porno rap; dirty hip hop; porn rap; sex rap; booty rap; ratchet rap; pornocore
- Stylistic origins: Hip hop; profanity; porn groove; hardcore hip hop; Miami bass
- Cultural origins: 1980s, United States
- Typical instruments: Rapping; turntables; sampler; drum machine; synthesizer

Other topics
- Ghetto house; ghettotech; new jack swing; pornogrind; Southern hip hop; dirty blues; Baltimore club

Dirty rap (also known as porno rap, porn rap, dirty hip hop, sex rap, booty rap, ratchet rap or pornocore) is a subgenre of hip hop music that contains lyrical content revolving mainly around sexually explicit subjects.

The lyrics are often overtly explicit and graphic, sometimes to the point of being comical or offensive. Historically, dirty rap often contained a distinctly bass-driven sound, which arose from the popular (and usually sexually explicit) Miami bass rap scene. However, dirty rap has recently also been heavily influenced by Baltimore club, ghetto house, and ghettotech. Many dirty rap songs have been used as soundtracks to pornographic movies since the 2000s, replacing the traditional porn groove.

== Late 1980s and early 1990s dirty rap ==
The genre had been around since at least the 1970s or the 1980s, with Blowfly's Rapp Dirty release. However, it was not until later that decade, when Oakland rapper Too Short released the 1985 album Don't Stop Rappin' containing multiple dirty sex subjects, that sex became a central focus. Although the release did not see much attention outside of his hometown of Oakland, he would continue to use provocative and sexual lyrics throughout his career, gaining him six platinum albums and three gold.

The controversial rap group 2 Live Crew brought "dirty rap" to the mainstream with their Miami bass debut 2 Live Crew Is What We Are. With the graphic sexual content of their X-rated party rhymes, 2 Live Crew garnered much negative publicity. However, it was not until their 1989 album, As Nasty as They Wanna Be, that dirty rap became a legitimate genre. After being attacked by conservative critics, censors, and attorneys, 2 Live Crew responded with the 1990 album Banned in the USA, a much more political and angry album.

2 Live Crew returned to their utterly pornographic roots with 1991's Sports Weekend: As Nasty as They Wanna Be, Pt. 2, which was lambasted by many critics as running the sexually deviant lyrics of As Nasty As They Wanna Be into the ground. From Sport's Weekend onward, the Crew continued to make dirty rap and party rap.

Various rappers followed with dirty rap in the wake of 2 Live Crew's popularity. The group Poison Clan became widely successful, as did the group Bytches With Problems. Sir Mix-A-Lot's 1992 hit single "Baby Got Back" could arguably be considered within the dirty rap genre; however, the majority of Mix-A-Lot's work is not sexually explicit enough for him to be considered a true dirty rap artist. Similarly, the new jack swing hip hop group Wreckx-n-Effect scored a dirty rap hit with their 1992 single "Rump Shaker".

In the early 1990s, the Baltimore club scene first began gaining an identity separate from house music and mainstream hip hop. Baltimore club, or gutter music, often features sexually explicit lyrics, and has influenced many current dirty rappers. Both ghettotech and ghetto house (or "booty house") also evolved around the same time, and, to an even greater extent than Baltimore club, frequently contain pornographic and sexually explicit content, as exemplified by DJ Assault and DJ Funk, two artists who pioneered ghettotech and ghetto house, respectively.

== Contemporary dirty rap ==
Dirty rap was a popular subgenre into the 1990s and 2000s, particular in Southern hip hop. Luke Campbell of 2 Live Crew continued to produce dirty rap as a solo artist into the 2000s.

Kool Keith described the lyrical content of his 1997 album Sex Style as "pornocore". The album features Keith variously portraying himself as characters ranging from pimps to perverts. Keith also uses sexual metaphors to diss other rappers, many of which involve urolagnia. Kool Keith later appeared on the 2001 album Porn Again, a dirty rap or pornocore concept album by the Smut Peddlers.

Lil Wayne was ranked one of the dirtiest rappers by Billboard in 2012.

== See also ==
- Dirty blues

== Bibliography ==
- Chang, Jeff. Can't Stop, Won't Stop: A History of the Hip-Hop Generation, Picador USA, 2006, ISBN 978-0-312-42579-1.
