= As Nasty as They Wanna Be =

1989 album by 2 Live Crew

Studio album by 2 Live Crew
- Released: February 7, 1989
- Recorded: 1988
- Genres: Miami bass; dirty rap
- Length: 79:30
- Labels: Luke; Atlantic
- Producer: 2 Live Crew

2 Live Crew chronology
Move Somethin' (1988)	As Nasty as They Wanna Be (1989)	Banned in the U.S.A. (1990)

Singles from As Nasty as They Wanna Be
- 1. "Me So Horny" Released: January 20, 1989; 2. "C'mon Babe" Released: February 15, 1989; 3. "The Fuck Shop" Released: 1990; 4. "Coolin'" Released: 1990 (UK only)

Professional ratings
Review scores
Source	Rating
AllMusic	5/5 stars
Robert Christgau	C
The Rolling Stone Album Guide	4/5 stars

As Nasty as They Wanna Be is the third album by American Miami bass group 2 Live Crew. It was released on February 7, 1989, and became the group's largest seller, being certified platinum by the Recording Industry Association of America. In 1990, the United States District Court for the Southern District of Florida ruled that the album was legally obscene; this ruling was later overturned by the Eleventh Circuit. This 11th Circuit decision was then appealed to the United States Supreme Court, which refused to hear the case. It is the first album in history to be deemed legally obscene.

On June 9, 1990, three band members were arrested by then-Sheriff Nick Navarro when they performed some tracks at a strip club in Broward County, Florida. In the "media circus" attendant on these events, only the Washington City Paper, Tipper Gore's Parents Music Resource Center and The Nation magazine published the offending lyrics. The columnist Christopher Hitchens argued that the Crew should be left alone, and that the prosecution was bigoted. Hitchens also argued that both the judge and the sheriff were "racist shitheads".

== Obscenity trial ==
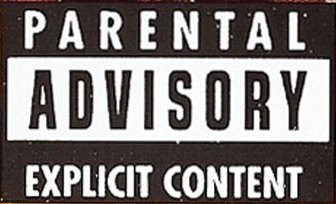
Parental Advisory sticker used in later releases of As Nasty as They Wanna Be

Shortly after the album was released, federal district judge Jose Gonzalez ruled that it was obscene and that stores and merchants in the several counties that fell under his jurisdiction could face charges if they made the album available for sale. Subsequently, on June 9, 1990, three band members were arrested by then-Sheriff Nick Navarro when they performed some tracks at a strip club in Broward County, Florida. In the "media circus" attendant on these events, only the Washington City Paper, Tipper Gore's Parents Music Resource Center and The Nation magazine published the offending lyrics. Christopher Hitchens, in a column on the last of these, citing the admonition on the cover of the album—"If you don't like the record, you can kiss our mother fuckin' ass"—commented,

Precisely. It's obvious to this reviewer that the Crew should be left alone, and that their foulmouthed attitude toward the gentler sex is a good-sounding excuse for a youth-hating and surreptitiously bigoted prosecution. I don't know the private thoughts of Sheriff Nick Navarro of Broward County, but I doubt they are worth a rat's behind and see no reason why he should sublimate his own vagina-dreading disorders in this expensive and undemocratic fashion. The same applies to the preposterous Judge Jose Gonzalez Jr., who in ruling on Sheriff Navarro's raid opined that the music appeals to "the loins, not to the intellect." In fact, I think they are a pair of racist shitheads who should be told to fuck right off.

During the 1990 Sound+Vision Tour in Philadelphia, David Bowie stopped his performance in the middle of the song "Young Americans" to speak out against music censorship, specifically due to the controversy over 2 Live Crew's album As Nasty as They Wanna Be, saying "I've been listening to the album by 2 Live Crew. It's not the best album that's ever been made, but when I heard they banned it, I went out and bought it. Freedom of thought, freedom of speech – it's one of the most important things we have."

An obscenity trial followed, in which Henry Louis Gates, Jr., addressed the court on behalf of the defendants, all of whom were eventually acquitted.

== Track listing ==
As Nasty as They Wanna Be track listing
No.	Title	Samples	Length
1.	"Me So Horny"	Vocal samples from the Stanley Kubrick movie Full Metal Jacket; Fragments of Nancy Sinatra's "These Boots Are Made for Walkin'" can be heard in the samples from Full Metal Jacket; The sex moans were taken from the 1977 film Which Way Is Up? starring Richard Pryor; Mass Production song "Firecracker"	4:36
2.	"Put Her in the Buck"	Main riff of the song and moans are sampled from the Chakachas' "Jungle Fever"	3:57
3.	"Dick Almighty"	Main riff of the song is sampled from the title track of Kraftwerk's The Man-Machine album; Vocal samples from Rudy Ray Moore, Kip Addotta, Richard Pryor and Richard & Willie; "My greatest thrill" is from Rudy Ray Moore's "The Player"; "15 inches long, 8 inches thick" is referenced on Leroy, Skillet & LaWanda's album Back Door Daddy.; Whodini's "Big Mouth"	4:53
4.	"C'mon Babe"		4:43
5.	"Dirty Nursery Rhymes"	Lyrically inspired by Andrew Dice Clay's "Nursery Rhymes" routine from his Dice album; Sample from Cheech and Chong's "Earache My Eye"	3:05
6.	"Break It on Down" (Campbell/Two Live Crew)		3:59
7.	"2 Live Blues"	"Love Me with a Feeling" by Clarence Carter	5:14
8.	"I Ain't Bullshittin'"	The title phrase is sampled from a Richard Pryor recording	4:27
9.	"Get Loose Now" (Campbell/Two Live Crew)	Rob Base and DJ E-Z Rock song "It Takes Two"; Beastie Boys song "The New Style"; The Jimmy Castor Bunch song "It's Just Begun"	4:36
10.	"The Fuck Shop"	Van Halen's "Ain't Talkin' 'Bout Love"; "I know a place just down there two streets" is from Leroy, Skillet & LaWanda's album Back Door Daddy.; Music Explosion's "Little Bit O' Soul"; Guns N' Roses's "Sweet Child O' Mine"	3:24
11.	"If You Believe in Having Sex"		3:51
12.	"My Seven Bizzos"	Jimi Hendrix's "Voodoo Child (Slight Return)"	4:18
13.	"Get the Fuck out of My House"	Eddie Murphy recording Eddie Murphy: Comedian; Laid Back's "White Horse"	4:37
14.	"Reggae Joint" (satire of dancehall music)	Replayed excerpt of the synth-bass riff from Wayne Smith's "Under Me Sleng Teng"	4:14
15.	"Fraternity Record"	Replayed excerpt of the guitar riff from the Beatles' "Day Tripper"	4:47
16.	"Bad Ass Bitch"		4:03
17.	"Mega Mixx III"	Largely instrumental; contains a sample of an electronic voice counting in German from the Kraftwerk song "Numbers/Computer World"	5:44
18.	"Coolin'" (Campbell/Two Live Crew)	Young-Holt Unlimited's "Soulful Strut"; The backing instrumental track from Barbara Acklin's "Am I the Same Girl"	5:02

== Personnel ==
- 2 Live Crew – producer
- Jimmy Magnoli – guitar
- Mr. Mixx – vocals, producer, performer, mixing
- Ted Stein – engineer, mixing
- Ron Taylor – engineer, mixing
- Chris Murphy – engineer

== As Clean as They Wanna Be ==
As Clean as They Wanna Be

Studio album by 2 Live Crew
- Released: June 15, 1989
- Recorded: 1988–1989
- Genre: Miami bass
- Length: 47:37
- Labels: Luke; Atlantic
- Producers: Luther Campbell; Mr. Mixx; 2 Live Crew

2 Live Crew chronology
Move Somethin' (1988)	As Clean as They Wanna Be (1989)	Banned in the U.S.A. (1990)

Professional ratings
Review scores
Source	Rating
AllMusic	2/5 stars
Select	2/5 medals

As Clean as They Wanna Be is the clean version of 2 Live Crew's third album. The album contains a disclaimer that "This album does not contain explicit lyrics". The album had notably worse sales than the explicit version. However, it does contain "Pretty Woman", which is not on the explicit version. The song – a parody of the Roy Orbison hit "Oh, Pretty Woman" – resulted in a Supreme Court case, Campbell v. Acuff-Rose Music, Inc., which established that a commercial parody can qualify as fair use. Despite the sticker on the album cover claiming "This album does not contain explicit lyrics", the song "Break It on Down" appears in its original, explicit form. Additionally, the song "City of Boom" (which is exclusive to the clean version) contains several explicit lyrics.

=== Track listing ===
All tracks are written by 2 Live Crew.

As Clean as They Wanna Be track listing
No.	Title	Length
1.	"The Funk Shop"	3:23
2.	"C'mon Babe"	4:19
3.	"Get Loose Now"	4:36
4.	"Coolin'"	5:03
5.	"You Got Larceny"	4:57
6.	"Me So Horny"	4:25
7.	"Pretty Woman" (parody of "Oh, Pretty Woman", written by Roy Orbison and Bill Dees)	3:20
8.	"My Seven Bizzos"	4:18
9.	"City of Boom"	3:32
10.	"Mega Mix III"	5:44
11.	"Break It on Down"	3:58

=== Personnel ===
- Mr. Mixx – vocals, producer, mixing
- Ted Stein – engineer, mixing
- Ron Taylor – engineer, mixing
- Milton Mizell – coordination
- Linda Fine – coordination
- Mac Hartshorn – photography
- Mike Holland, aka Mike Bizzo – H.N.I.C.
- Luther Campbell – producer, executive producer
- Nic Stone, aka Spoon 56 – Mocha Thunder Generation
- Debbie Bennett – coordination
- Mike Fuller – mastering

== Charts ==
=== Weekly charts ===
Weekly chart performance for As Nasty as They Wanna Be
Chart (1989–1990)	Peak position
Dutch Albums (Album Top 100)	30
US Billboard 200	29
US Top R&B/Hip-Hop Albums (Billboard)	3

=== Year-end charts ===
Year-end performance for As Nasty as They Wanna Be
Chart (1989)	Position
US Top R&B/Hip-Hop Albums (Billboard)	36

== Certifications ==
Certifications for As Nasty as They Wanna Be
Region	Certification	Certified units/sales
United States (RIAA)	Platinum	1,000,000^{^}
^{^} Shipments figures based on certification alone.

== Legacy ==
It was the final album to be released under the Skyywalker Records label. Following a successful lawsuit against Luther Campbell and Skyywalker Records by Star Wars creator and director George Lucas, the company was forced to change its name to Luke Records.

The album is broken down track-by-track by Luke and Mr. Mixx in Brian Coleman's book Check the Technique.

In 2010, the album cover and imagery of the record were used in the music video of the song "The Rabbit" by Swedish band Miike Snow.
