= Miami bass =

Subgenre of hip-hop from South Florida

- Stylistic origins: Hip-hop; electro; breakbeat
- Cultural origins: Mid-1980s, Miami, Florida, U.S.
- Typical instruments: drum machine; turntables; sampler; synthesizer
- Derivative forms: Funk carioca; freestyle; Dirty rap

Subgenres
- Audio bass

Regional scenes
- Music of Florida

Local scenes
- Music of Miami

Other topics
- Dirty rap; bounce; Memphis rap; Chopped and screwed; crunk; trap

Miami bass (also known as booty music or booty bass) is a subgenre of hip-hop that became popular in the 1980s and 1990s. The use of drums from the Roland TR-808, sustained kick drum, heavy bass, raised dance tempos, and frequently sexually explicit lyrical content differentiate it from other hip-hop subgenres. Music author Richie Unterberger has characterized Miami bass as using rhythms with a "stop-start flavor" and "hissy" cymbals with lyrics that "reflected the language of the streets, particularly Miami's historically black neighborhoods such as Liberty City, Goulds, and Overtown".

Despite Miami bass never having consistent mainstream acceptance, early national media attention in the 1980s resulted in a profound impact on the development of hip-hop, dance music, and pop.

== History ==
=== 1980s origins ===
External audio
- Origin of Miami Bass
- Bass Rock Express by MC A.D.E. credited as the first hit of the genre, YouTube video
- Throw the D by 2 Live Crew credited with international exposure and shaping the genre, YouTube video

During the 1980s, the focus of Miami bass tended to be on DJs and record producers, rather than individual performers. Record labels such as Pandisc, HOT Records, 4-Sight Records and Skyywalker Records released much material of the genre. Unterberger has referred to James (Maggotron) McCauley (also known as DXJ, Maggozulu Too, Planet Detroit and Bass Master Khan) as the "father of Miami bass", a distinction McCauley denies, choosing to confer that status on producer Amos Larkins.

DJ Kurtis Mantronik (Mantronix) was a key influence on Miami bass. In particular, Mantronik's single "Bass Machine" (1986), featuring rap vocals by T La Rock, was pivotal to the development of Miami bass.

MC ADE's "Bass Rock Express", with music and beats produced by Amos Larkins, is often credited as being the first Miami bass record to gain underground popularity on an international scale.

The single "Throw The D" by the group 2 Live Crew in 1986 gave a permanent blueprint to how future Miami bass songs were written and produced.

=== Popularity ===
2 Live Crew (Mark "Brother Marquis" Ross, Christopher "Fresh Kid Ice" Wong Won, Luther "Luke Skyywalker" Campbell and David "Mr. Mixx" Hobbs) played a key role in popularizing Miami bass in the late 1980s and early 1990s. The group's 1986 release, The 2 Live Crew Is What We Are, became controversial for its sexually explicit lyrics. 1989's As Nasty As They Wanna Be, along with its hit single "Me So Horny", proved more controversial still, leading to legal troubles for both 2 Live Crew and retailers selling the album. All charges were eventually overturned on appeal.

For the better part of the mid 1980s and early 1990s, DJs such as Luke Skyywalker's Ghetto Style DJs, Norberto Morales' Triple M DJs, Super JD's MHF DJs, Space Funk DJs, Mohamed Moretta, DJ Nice & Nasty, Felix Sama, DJ Spin, Ramon Hernandez, Bass Master DJs, DJ Laz, Earl "The Pearl" Little, Uncle Al, Ser MC, Raylo & Dem Damn Dogs, DJ Slice, K-Bass, Jam Pony Express and others were heavily involved in playing Miami bass at local outdoor events to large audiences at area beaches, parks, and fairs.

Clubs in South Florida, including Pac-Jam, Superstars Rollertheque, Bass Station, Studio 183, Randolphs, Nepenthe, Video Powerhouse, Skylight Express, Beat Club and Club Boca, were hosting bass nights on a regular basis. Miami radio airplay and programming support was strong in the now defunct Rhythm 98, as well as WEDR and WPOW (Power 96).

Contribution and promotion of Miami bass also came out of Orlando. 102 Jamz (WJHM), a prominent Orlando radio station in the late 1980s, featured Miami bass and helped its popularity rise in and around Central Florida.

Florida breaks was heavily influenced by Miami bass in addition to elements of house, and deep bass that eventually created "The Orlando Sound". Thus, Miami bass quickly became a Florida staple.

=== 1990s ===
By the mid-1990s, the influence of Miami bass had spread outside South and Central Florida to all areas of Florida and the Southern United States. In the mid-1990s, it saw a commercial and mainstream resurgence, with Miami bass influenced artists such as L'Trimm, 95 South, Tag Team, 69 Boyz, Quad City DJ's and Freak Nasty all scoring big Miami bass hits. Examples of these songs are "Whoomp! (There It Is)" by Tag Team in 1993, "Tootsee Roll" by 69 Boyz in 1994, "C'mon N' Ride It (The Train)" by the Quad City DJ's in 1996 and "Whoot, There It Is" by 95 South in 1993.

These songs all reached the top 20 on the Billboard Hot 100 chart and exposed Miami bass nationally. These artists generally used a Miami bass sound and production but did it in a far less explicit and far more accessible way than had been previously done by Campbell and the 2 Live Crew.

Miami bass is closely related to the electronic dance music genres of ghettotech and booty house, genres which combine Detroit techno and Chicago house with the Miami bass sound. Ghettotech follows the same sexually oriented lyrics, hip-hop bass lines and streetwise attitude, but with harder, uptempo Roland TR-909 techno-style kick beats. In 2007, contemporary hip-hop and R&B songs became more dance oriented, showing influences of Miami bass and techno, and are typically sped up to a "chipmunk" sound for faster tempos for dances such as juking, wu-tanging and bopping, usually only done in Miami-Dade, Broward and Palm Beach Counties in south Florida.

=== Subgenres ===
Miami bass has been influenced by the cultural history of its wide-ranging community with the evolution of Cuban, Dominican, and Afro-Brazilian-fused sub-genres that include Baltimore club and funk carioca.

Another subgenre of Miami bass is "car audio bass", which features an even more stripped down bass-heavy sound, tending to focus on either extremely hard 909 kicks combined with sine waves or the classic 808 kick, or sometimes simply the sine wave by itself. Some artist examples would be DJ Laz, DJ Magic Mike, Afro-Rican (as Power Supply), Techmaster P.E.B., DJ Billy E, Bass 305 and Bass Patrol.

== Stylistic differences ==
=== In African music ===
Gqom, an African electronic dance genre that originated in Durban, South Africa, in the early 2010s, is sometimes conflated with Miami bass due to perceived similarities between Durban's cityscape and Miami's South and North Beach areas as well as car culture, with enhanced car sound systems, with an emphasis on bass. However, gqom and miami bass are distinct in their origins and their production styles.

== Notes ==
- Pappawheelie. "Miami Bass: The Primer" Stylus Magazine
- Unterberger, Richie (1999). Music USA: The Rough Guide. The Rough Guides. pp. 144–145. ISBN 1-85828-421-X.
