= Don't Sleep On a Hizzo =

Single by Poison Clan

from the album Ruff Town Behavior
- Released: 1993
- Recorded: 1993
- Genre: Dirty Rap, Gangsta Rap, Miami Bass
- Length: 4:09
- Label: Luke Records
- Songwriter(s): JT Money
- Producer(s): Mike Fresh McCray, Luther Campbell

"Don't Sleep on a Hizzo" [AKA: Put Shit Pass No Ho] is a 1993 song by Southern hip hop group Poison Clan, that originally appeared on the group's third album, Ruff Town Behavior. The song peaked at No. 94 on the Hot R&B/Hip-Hop Singles & Tracks chart making it the lowest-charting Poison Clan single to date. In addition to a 12-inch single, a music video was released for the song and, as with almost all Poison Clan videos, the song's lyrics would be altered to remove the strong language found in the original uncensored version's lyrics. The song would later appear on Poison Clan's 1999 greatest hits release, The Best of JT Money & Poison Clan.
