= Ruff Town Behavior =

Studio album by Poison Clan
- Released: June 25, 1993
- Recorded: 1992–93
- Genre: Southern hip hop; dirty rap; gangsta rap
- Length: 1:07:04
- Label: Luke
- Producer: Mike "Fresh" McCray; Professor Griff; Swift

Poison Clan chronology
Poisonous Mentality (1992)	Ruff Town Behavior (1993)	Strait Zooism (1995)

Professional ratings
Review scores
Source	Rating
AllMusic	2.5/5 stars

Ruff Town Behavior is the third studio album by American hip hop group Poison Clan. It was released on June 25, 1993, via Luke Records, and was the group's final record for the label. It was produced by Mike "Fresh" McCray, Professor Griff, and Swift, with Luther Campbell serving as executive producer.

The album was Poison Clan's most successful album, reaching No. 97 on the Billboard 200, No. 12 on the Top R&B/Hip-Hop Albums chart, and No. 12 on Top Heatseekers. One single, "Put Shit Pass No Ho", peaked at No. 94 on the Hot R&B/Hip-Hop Singles & Tracks chart.

== Track listing ==
All lyrics are written by Jeff "JT Money" Thompkins, except track 21 written with Clayvoise, Sir Gucci & Toby Dick; all music is composed by Mike "Fresh" McCray, except track 23 produced by Swift and track 25 produced by Professor Griff.

No.	Title	Length
1.	"Intro"	2:11
2.	"Afraid of the Flavor"	4:15
3.	"Come a Surprise"	0:19
4.	"Put Shit Pass No Ho"	4:09
5.	"Some More Shit"	3:28
6.	"Work for Free"	0:23
7.	"Peepin'"	4:09
8.	"Pause for the Cause"	0:58
9.	"Game Recognize Game"	4:30
10.	"City Boy"	3:21
11.	"Burn One"	0:08
12.	"Check out the Ave., Pt. 1"	3:15
13.	"Let's Get Serious"	2:20
14.	"Check out the Ave., Pt. 2"	3:00
15.	"Setting Up"	0:30
16.	"Sugarhill Style"	4:23
17.	"True Player Speaks"	0:50
18.	"Word from a Player"	5:02
19.	"Ho Stories, Pt. 2"	3:03
20.	"Madball Back"	0:23
21.	"Listen"	5:19
22.	"MC Sundance"	1:35
23.	"Ruff Town Behavior"	4:03
24.	"Comin Strap"	1:14
25.	"Goin' All Out"	4:16
Total length:		1:07:04

== Charts ==
Chart (1993)	Peak position
US Billboard 200	97
