= Luke's Freak Fest 2000 =

Compilation album by Luke
- Released: March 7, 2000
- Recorded: 1999–2000
- Genre: Hip hop
- Length: 1:11:55
- Label: Luke; Loud
- Producer: 69 Boyz; Devastator; Disco Rick; DJ Paul; Jay Ski; Darren “DJ Spin” Rudnick; Juicy J; Luke; Michael Starr; Robert "Reo" Owens; Ty Scott

Luke chronology
Greatest Hits (1996)	Luke's Freak Fest 2000 (2000)	Scandalous: The All Star Compilation (2002)

Professional ratings
Review scores
Source	Rating
AllMusic	3/5 stars
The Source	3/5 stars
Spin	6/10

Luke's Freak Fest 2000 is a compilation album by American rapper and record producer Luke. It was released on March 7, 2000, through Luke Records through distribution from Loud Records (under the new-found structure of its merger into Sony Music's subsidiary Relativity Records only months prior). Production was handled by Jay "Ski" McGowan, 69 Boyz, Devastator, Darren “DJ Spin” Rudnick, Disco Rick, DJ Paul, Juicy J, Michael Starr, Robert "Reo" Owens, Ty Scott and Luke himself. It features new material from Luke and contributions from No Good But So Good, 10 K.A.N.S., 69 Boyz, 95 South, 606, Armageddon, Big Pun, Cuban Link, Del Harris, DJ Uncle Al, Goodie Mob, Jiggie Gee, Krayzie Bone, Ms. Tee, Quad City DJ's, Sylvia, Tear Da Club Up Thugs, Tightwork and Underground. The album peaked at number 140 on the Billboard 200 and number 37 on the Top R&B/Hip-Hop Albums in the United States.

== Track listing ==
No.	Title	Producer(s)	Length
1.	"Luke Intro"		0:21
2.	"Freak Shawty" (featuring Jay "Ski" McGowan)	Jay "Ski" McGowan	3:40
3.	"Girls Talkin' Shit"		0:31
4.	"Slippery When Wet" (featuring Big Pun, Cuban Link and Armageddon)	Luke Darren “DJ Spin” Rudnick	4:21
5.	"Tigger & Luke"		0:33
6.	"Creeping" (performed by Jiggie Gee and Del Harris)	Jay "Ski" McGowan	3:32
7.	"Fucks up Bishops Credit"		0:22
8.	"Get Rowdy" (featuring DJ Uncle Al)	Luke	3:58
9.	"Chief Vs Luke"		0:47
10.	"Baby Be Mine" (performed by Quad City DJ's)	Jay "Ski" McGowan	4:12
11.	"Tear It Up" (performed by No Good But So Good)	Devastator	5:19
12.	"Talkin' 'Bout" (featuring 606 and Ms. Tee)	Michael Starr	4:31
13.	"Lucky Gets Lucky"		0:43
14.	"Loving You" (performed by Sylvia)	Robert "Reo" Owens	3:15
15.	"Holla at Jay "Ski""		0:36
16.	"Can I Holla" (performed by Tightwork)	Jay "Ski" McGowan	3:55
17.	"Shawna & Tracy Fight"		0:49
18.	"Ain't Spending Nothing" (featuring Krayzie Bone)	Luke; Disco Rick	3:02
19.	"Hoe Surprise"		0:28
20.	"Strokin'" (featuring 69 Boyz)	69 Boyz	4:16
21.	"The Show"	Luke	3:17
22.	"Lay Your Ass Down" (performed by Underground)	Luke	4:42
23.	"Club Rats" (featuring Jay "Ski" McGowan and 10 K.A.N.S.)	Jay "Ski" McGowan	4:21
24.	"Bishop Don Juan"		1:22
25.	"Dirty Bottom" (performed by Goodie Mob and No Good But So Good)	Ty Scott	3:50
26.	"What We Like" (performed by 95 South)	Jay "Ski" McGowan	3:47
27.	"Slob on My Knob" (performed by Tear Da Club Up Thugs)	DJ Paul; Juicy J	1:25
Total length:			1:11:55

== Charts ==
Chart (2000)	Peak position
US Billboard 200	140
US Top R&B/Hip-Hop Albums (Billboard)	37
US Independent Albums (Billboard)	9
