= The Girl That I Hate =

1990 single by Poison Clan

Single by Poison Clan

from the album 2 Low Life Muthas
- Released: 1990
- Recorded: 1989
- Genre: Dirty Rap, Southern Hip Hop, Comedy hip hop
- Length: 4:32
- Label: Luke Records
- Songwriters: JT Money, David Hobbs
- Producer: Mr. Mixx

"The Girl That I Hate" (aka "The Bitch That I Hate") is a 1990 song by Southern Hip Hop group Poison Clan that originally appeared on their debut album 2 Low Life Muthas. The song peaked at #18 on the Billboard Hot Rap Singles chart and was released as a 12-inch single. As is the case with nearly all songs that the group released as a single for radio airplay, some of the lyrics were altered in the radio edit to remove the strong, profane language that dominated the original album version. The song would later appear nearly a decade later on Poison Clan's 1999 greatest hits album The Best of JT Money & Poison Clan.
