= Fuck wit Dre Day (And Everybody's Celebratin') =

1993 single by Dr. Dre featuring Snoop Doggy Dogg

Single by Dr. Dre featuring Snoop Doggy Dogg

from the album The Chronic
- B-side: "Puffin' on Blunts and Drankin' Tanqueray"
- Released: May 8, 1993
- Recorded: 1992
- Genre: G-funk
- Length: 4:52
- Label: Death Row; Interscope; Priority
- Songwriters: Andre Young; Calvin Broadus; Colin Wolfe; George Clinton; Garry Shider; David Spradley
- Producer: Dr. Dre

Dr. Dre singles chronology
"Nuthin' but a 'G' Thang" (1993)	"Fuck wit Dre Day (And Everybody's Celebratin')" (1993)	"Let Me Ride" (1993)

Snoop Doggy Dogg singles chronology
"Nuthin' but a 'G' Thang" (1993)	"Fuck Wit Dre Day (And Everybody's Celebratin')" (1993)	"Let Me Ride" (1993)

Audio sample
- file; help

Music video
- "Fuck wit Dre Day (And Everybody's Celebratin')" on YouTube

"Fuck wit Dre Day (And Everybody's Celebratin')", or censored as a single titled "Dre Day", is a song by American rapper and producer Dr. Dre featuring fellow American rapper Snoop Doggy Dogg and uncredited vocals from Jewell released in May 1993 as the second single from Dre's debut solo album, The Chronic (1992). "Dre Day" was a diss track targeting mainly Dre's former groupmate Eazy-E, who led their onetime rap group N.W.A and who, along with N.W.A's manager Jerry Heller, owned N.W.A's record label, Ruthless Records. In "Dre Day" and in its music video, which accuse Eazy of cheating N.W.A's artists, Dre and Snoop degrade and menace him. Also included are disses retorting earlier disses on songs by Miami rapper Luke Campbell, by New York rapper Tim Dog, and by onetime N.W.A. member Ice Cube, although Dre, while still an N.W.A member, had helped diss Cube first. After "Dre Day," a number of further diss records were exchanged.

== Analysis ==
On the main popular songs chart, the US Billboard Hot 100, whereas The Chronic's lead single, "Nuthin' but a 'G' Thang", reached number two, "Dre Day" peaked at number eight in June 1993. The song's bassline is a slowed interpolation from Funkadelic's song "(Not Just) Knee Deep." The chorus includes vocals by two more Death Row Records artists, R&B singer Jewell and rapper RBX. Also included is a sample and an interpolation from George Clinton’s song “Atomic Dog."

A diss track, "Dre Day" mainly targeted Dre's former N.W.A groupmate Eazy-E. It also dissed New York rapper Tim Dog for his song "Fuck Compton", and retorted Miami rapper Luke Campbell, a member of group 2 Live Crew, whose debut solo album I Got Shit On My Mind included the track "Fakin' Like Gangstas." Some "Dre Day" lyrics allude to former N.W.A rapper Ice Cube, whose 1989 departure from the group was acrimonious, leading to multiple disses directed at Cube from Dre and fellow groupmate MC Ren across N.W.A's 100 Miles and Runnin' and Niggaz4Life. Cube retorted on his album Death Certificate, which contained the track "No Vaseline."

In "Dre Day," Dre vows "to creep to South Central," which is Ice Cube's hometown, "on a Street Knowledge mission," while Cube's own record label was initially named Street Knowledge Productions. Dre lyrically "steps in the temple," evidently alluding to Cube's affiliation with the Nation of Islam, and claims to "spot him" by a "White Sox hat," which Cube often donned. Earlier in 1992, Cube had released his album The Predator, which featured the song "Check Yo Self". Referencing said song, Dre adds, "You tryin to check my homey, you best check yo self." Not parodied in the "Dre Day" music video, however, Cube instead would cameo, signaling reconciliation with Dre, in the September 1993 music video of the next and last Chronic single, "Let Me Ride."

== Music video ==
Dr. Dre directed the music video, which parodies Eazy-E as "Sleazy-E," played by actor A. J. Johnson with an exaggerated Jheri Curl hairstyle, a plaid shirt, and dark sunglasses. Prefacing the song performance is a skit, wherein Sleazy-E enters the office of "Useless Records" where a rotund Jewish man hires him to find some rappers. This mimic of Eazy-E's Ruthless Records co-owner Jerry Heller was played by Interscope Records executive Steve Berman. (Berman later played in three Eminem skits and one D12 skit.)

An interlude shows Sleazy-E introducing two newly acquired protégés, played by Bushwick Bill and Warren G, to his manager. In other scenes, Sleazy sustains gunfire, becomes homeless, is chased by armed men, and finally, along the Pasadena Freeway, holds up a cardboard sign scribbled WILL RAP FOR FOOD. The "Dre Day" video also parodies Luke Campbell of Miami rap group 2 Live Crew, portraying him jumping around on a stage. In 2005, a survey by MTV2 and XXL ranked the "Dre Day" music video 12th among the "25 Greatest West Coast Videos".

== Artist responses ==
The "Dre Day" single's B side "Puffin' on Blunts and Drankin' Tanqueray," featuring The Lady of Rage and Tha Dogg Pound, contains more disses from Dr. Dre, aimed at Eazy-E, Tim Dog, and Luke Campbell, while Kurupt disses Ruthless Records rappers Above the Law and Kokane. On Kokane's second album, he and Above the Law member Cold 187um replied with "Don't Bite the Phunk". Eazy-E would go on to release a response EP, It's On (~~Dr. Dre~~) 187^{um} Killa which included disses directed at Dr. Dre on the songs "Exxtra Special Thankz", "It's On," "Still a Nigga," and, most notably, "Real Muthaphuckkin G's", featuring new recording artists B.G. Knocc Out and Dresta.

"Real Muthaphuckkin G's" would become Eazy-E's biggest hit as a solo artist. Its music video imports from the "Dre Day" music video the character Sleazy-E, who in Eazy-E's music video is still roadside holding up a WILL RAP FOR FOOD sign, but is later chased through town, dragged into a van, and eventually lies motionless at his earlier roadside spot, or, in the video's radio edit, falls flat when running near a Leaving Compton road sign. On the short film Murder Was the Case's soundtrack, Snoop Dogg and Tha Dogg Pound responded with "What Would U Do?" while its music video parodies Eazy-E's proteges B.G. Knocc Out and Dresta themselves chased and beaten by Tha Dogg Pound.

Tim Dog responded to "Dre Day" with an EP titled Bitch With a Perm, including the title track and "Dog Baby," which yielded a music video including a dancing Snoop Dogg mimic with straightened hair, a "perm" hairstyle. Luke replied on his second solo album's song "Cowards in Compton," whose music video parodies both Dre's inclusion in the 1980s electro-rap group World Class Wreckin' Cru and casts Dre and Snoop lookalikes ridiculed in a mock of the "Nuthin' but a 'G' Thang" music video. Luke's album, In The Nude, also included a skit, "Dre's Momma Needs a Haircut," targeting "Tha Shiznit" skit on Snoop's debut solo or November 1993 album, Doggystyle. Compton rapper Tweedy Bird Loc joined against Luke by issuing "Fucc Miami” on his 1994 album No Holds Barred.

== Track listing ==
- UK CD single
1. "Dre Day" (Radio Version) - 4:52
2. "Dre Day" (UK Radio Flavour) - 4:56
3. "Dre Day" (Extended Club Mix) - 9:53
4. "Dre Day" (UK Flavour) - 4:58
5. "Dre Day" (Instrumental) - 4:52
6. "Dre Day" (LP Version) - 4:52
- German CD single
1. "Dre Day" (Radio Version) - 4:52
2. "Puffin' on Blunts and Drankin' Tanqueray" - 11:16
- UK 12" vinyl
1. "Dre Day" (LP Version) - 4:52
2. "Dre Day" (Radio Version) - 4:52
3. "Puffin' on Blunts and Drankin' Tanqueray" - 11:16
4. "Dre Day" (Extended Club Mix) - 9:53
5. "One Eight Seven" - 5:52
- 12" vinyl - EP
1. "Dre Day" (Radio Version) - 4:52
2. "Dre Day" (Extended Club Mix) - 10:00
3. "Dre Day" (LP Version) - 4:52
4. "Lil' Ghetto Boy" (Radio Mix) - 5:27
5. "One Eight Seven" - 5:52
6. "Puffin' on Blunts and Drankin' Tanqueray" - 11:16
- US 12" vinyl
1. "Dre Day" (LP Version) - 4:52
2. "Dre Day" (Radio Version) - 4:52
3. "Puffin' on Blunts and Drankin' Tanqueray" - 11:16
4. "Puffin' on Blunts and Drankin' Tanqueray" (Instrumental) - 11:16
5. "Dre Day" (Extended Club Mix) - 9:53
6. "One Eight Seven" - 5:52
- German 12" vinyl
1. "Dre Day" (Extended Club Mix) - 9:53
2. "Dre Day" (UK Flavour) - 4:58
3. "Puffin' on Blunts and Drankin' Tanqueray" - 11:16
- Cassette
1. "Dre Day" (Radio Version) - 4:52
2. "Dre Day" (Instrumental) - 4:52

== Charts ==
=== Weekly charts ===
Chart (1993)	Peak position
New Zealand (Recorded Music NZ)	49
UK Singles (OCC)	59
UK Dance (OCC)	18
UK Dance (Music Week)	18
US Billboard Hot 100	8
US Dance Club Songs (Billboard)	29
US Hot R&B/Hip-Hop Songs (Billboard)	6
US Hot Rap Songs (Billboard)	13
US Rhythmic Airplay (Billboard)	6
US Hot Dance Music/Maxi-Singles Sales (Billboard)	1
US Cash Box Top 100	8

=== Year-end charts ===
Chart (1993)	Position
US Billboard Hot 100	53
US Hot R&B/Hip-Hop Songs (Billboard)	58
US Cash Box Top 100	14

== Certifications ==
Region	Certification	Certified units/sales
United States (RIAA)	Gold	800,000

== Samples ==
- All from Parliament:

- Funkentelechy vs. the Placebo Syndrome (Casablanca 1977): "Funkentelechy"
- Motor Booty Affair (Casablanca 1978): "Aquaboogie (A Psychoalphadiscobetabioaquadoloop)"
- Gloryhallastoopid (Casablanca 1979): "The Big Bang Theory"

- "(Not Just) Knee Deep" by Funkadelic:
- "Atomic Dog" by George Clinton - This song is the source of the "Bow wow wow yippy yo yippy yay" line in the song.

== See also ==
- List of notable diss tracks
