= Strait Zooism =

Studio album by Poison Clan
- Released: November 7, 1995
- Recorded: 1995
- Genre: Southern hip hop, dirty rap, gangsta rap
- Length: 1:06:34
- Label: Warlock Records
- Producer: Mike "Fresh" McCray, JT Money

Poison Clan chronology
Ruff Town Behavior (1993)	Strait Zooism (1995)	The Best of JT Money & the Poison Clan (1999)

Professional ratings
Review scores
Source	Rating
AllMusic	2.5/5 stars

Strait Zooism is the fourth and final studio album released by rap group Poison Clan. It was released on November 7, 1995 through Warlock Records and was produced by Mike "Fresh" McCray and JT Money. Strait Zooism reached No. 80 on the Billboard Top R&B/Hip-Hop Albums chart. This album was also Poison Clan's only album not released through Luke Records, as the group had left the record label due to a money dispute with Luther Campbell.

== Track listing ==
1. "Intro"- 2:01
2. "Fire Up This Funk" [B-izer Version]- 3:31
3. "Zooism"- 5:11
4. "Paper Chase"- 5:45
5. "Peep da Flava"- 3:07
6. "Blow da Spot"- 1:02
7. "Ahead of My Time"- 4:00
8. "Rainbow Annihilators"- 6:49
9. "Strictly for da Hardcore"- 4:00
10. "Rather Deal with a Ho Than a Bitch"- 3:39
11. "Ganja Fiend"- 5:09
12. "Something About Them Bitches"- 4:16
13. "Shine Me Up"- 3:51
14. "Buckle Up"- 5:23
15. "Fire Up This Funk [Listen Mix]"- 3:38
16. "Busts a Pipe"- 5:12
