= Live in Concert (2 Live Crew album) =

Live album by 2 Live Crew
- Released: September 22, 1990
- Recorded: 1990
- Studio: Record Plant Mobile (Los Angeles, CA)
- Genres: Hardcore rap; Miami bass
- Length: 55:22
- Labels: Effect; Luke Records
- Producers: Luke Skyywalker (also exec.); 2 Live Crew

2 Live Crew chronology
Banned in the U.S.A. (1990)	Live in Concert (1990)	Sports Weekend: As Nasty As They Wanna Be, Pt. 2 (1991)

Professional ratings
Review scores
Source	Rating
Allmusic	1/5 stars

Live in Concert is the first and only live album by American rap group 2 Live Crew and their fifth record overall. It was released under the Effect subsidiary label of Luke Records, a move that was deemed necessary for the company to be able to release additional 2 Live Crew material outside of their distribution deal with Atlantic Records, which was signed in 1990 – the same year they released Banned In The U.S.A.. The album peaked at number 46 on the Top R&B/Hip-Hop Albums.

== Track listing ==
No.	Title	Length
1.	"Head, Booty And Cock"	3:45
2.	"C'mon Babe"	3:39
3.	"Face Down Ass Up"	2:59
4.	"Throw The Dick"	3:17
5.	"One And One"	2:24
6.	"Mr. Mixx Turntable Show (Part I)"	5:29
7.	"Sex, I Like It, I Love It"	4:22
8.	"Mr. Mixx Turntable Show (Part II)"	3:38
9.	"If You Believe In Having Sex"	3:49
10.	"The Fuck Shop"	3:00
11.	"Move Somthin'"	4:36
12.	"We Want Some Pussy"	3:54
13.	"Me So Horny"	5:07
14.	"Banned In The U.S.A."	5:23
Total length:		55:22

Note

- Track 8 contents elements from "It Takes Two" by Rob Base & DJ E-Z Rock (1988)

== Personnel ==
- Luther Roderick Campbell - performer, producer, executive producer
- David P. Hobbs - performer, producer
- Mark D. Ross - performer
- Christopher Wong Won - performer
- Robert Margouleff - engineer
- Brant Biles - assistant engineer
- Brian Jackson - photography
