= Dance All Night =

Dance All Night may refer to:

== Albums ==
- Dance All Night (album), by XL, 2012
- Dance All Night, by Chubby Carrier, 1993

== Songs ==
- "Dance All Night" (DeBarge song), 1987
- "Dance All Night" (Jessica Wright song), 2012
- "Dance All Night" (Poison Clan song), 1990
- "Dance All Night", by Autograph from Loud and Clear, 1987
- "Dance All Night", by Emma, 1991
- "Dance All Night", by Rosé from Rosie, 2024
- "Dance All Night", by The Tartans
