= Kao's II Wiz*7*Dome =

Kao's II Wiz-7-Dome

Studio album by Professor Griff
- Released: July 23, 1991
- Recorded: 1991
- Genre: Political hip hop
- Length: 55:09
- Labels: Luke/Atlantic Records; 91721
- Producers: Professor Griff; Luke Skyywalker; Kavon Shah

Professor Griff chronology
Pawns in the Game (1990)	Kao's II Wiz-7-Dome (1991)	Disturb N Tha Peace (1992)

Professional ratings
Review scores
Source	Rating
Allmusic	2.5/5 stars

Kao's II Wiz-7-Dome is the second album by emcee Professor Griff. The album was released on July 23, 1991, on Luke/Atlantic Records and was produced by Professor Griff, Luke Skyywalker, and Kavon Shah. The album was even less commercially successful than his previous album, Pawns in the Game, only making it to #70 on the Top R&B/Hip-Hop Albums chart. One single was released, titled "Jail Sale," but it did not make it to any of the Billboard charts. The number seven refers to the Nation of Gods and Earths, of which Griff is a member.

== Track listing ==
1. "Assassination Attempt"- 0:53
2. "Kao's II Wiz*7*Dome"- 4:21
3. "Mental Genocide"- 3:11
4. "Joey Hate Rap Calls the Cops"- 1:09
5. "Fugitive"- 3:36
6. "Jail Sale"- 5:08
7. "Crucified Prelude"- 1:23
8. "Crucified"- 2:51
9. "Rev 2:26"- 4:07
10. "Verbal Intercourse" 4:14
11. "My Ideology"- 4:17
12. "The Late, Great Black Man"- 4:29
13. "In-Cog-Negrow"- 4:22
14. "Grandma Vanilla Don't Like Loud Rap Music"- 1:37
15. "Bro Kemit Splitting Atoms in the Corporate War Zone"- 6:04
16. "Blax Thanx Pt II"- 3:27
