= Pawns in the Game =

Studio album by Professor Griff and the Last Asiatic Disciples
- Released: March 27, 1990
- Recorded: 1989–1990
- Studio: Skyywalker Recording Studio (Liberty City, FL)
- Genre: Political hip hop
- Label: Luke/Atlantic Records
- Producer: Luke Skyywalker (exec.); Beatmaster Clay D; Jim "Obie" O'Brien; Kerwin "Sleek" Young; Professor Griff

Professor Griff chronology
Pawns in the Game (1990)	Kao's II Wiz*7*Dome (1991)

Singles from Pawns in the Game
- 1. "Pawns in the Game" Released: 1990; 2. "The Verdict" Released: 1990

Professional ratings
Review scores
Source	Rating
AllMusic	2.5/5 stars
Robert Christgau	C
The Encyclopedia of Popular Music	3/5 stars
MusicHound Rock: The Essential Album Guide	1/5 stars
The Rolling Stone Album Guide	2.5/5 stars

Pawns in the Game is the only studio album by the American musician Professor Griff and the Last Asiatic Disciples, which included Life (Sean Peacock), Patrick X (Sean Smith), B-Wyze (Robert L. Harding, Jr.), Jim "Obie" O'Brien (John Michael O'Brian), and JXL (Jason Wicks). It was released in 1990 via Luke/Atlantic Records. The recording sessions took place at Skyywalker Recording Studio in Liberty City. The production was mainly handled by Griff, with co-producers O'Brien, Beatmaster Clay D (Clay Dixon) and Kerwin "Sleek" Young. Luke Skyywalker served as the executive producer.

The album peaked at number 127 on the Billboard 200 and number 24 on the Top R&B/Hip-Hop Albums chart. The title track and "The Verdict" were the only singles released. "Pawns in the Game" entered the Billboard rap singles chart at number 4.

Due to comments made by Griff prior to the album's recording, Pawns in the Game was not carried by every national record chain.

== Critical reception ==
The Chicago Tribune wrote that "although the music is good, and Griff and his crew are proficient rappers, Pawns in the Game is missing the urgency and spunk that fuel Public Enemy`s recordings." MusicHound Rock: The Essential Album Guide called the album "morally irritating." Trouser Press wrote that "although its strong rhythm tracks are gripping enough, the baldly proselytic Pawns in the Game isn’t about entertainment." The Rolling Stone Album Guide wrote that there are "enough hard beats built into the backing tracks to cover for Griff's sometimes shaky delivery."

== Track listing ==
All tracks are written by Richard Griffin, Sean Peacock, Sean Smith, Robert Harding, John Michael O'Brian and Jason Wicks.

No.	Title	Producer(s)	Length
1.	"Pawns In The Game"	Professor Griff; Kerwin "Sleek" Young	2:27
2.	"The Verdict"	Professor Griff; Beat Master Clay D.	4:28
3.	"Suzi Wants To Be A Rock Star"	Professor Griff; Beat Master Clay D.	5:17
4.	"Real African People 'Rap' Part 1"	Professor Griff; Kerwin "Sleek" Young	3:44
5.	"Pass The Ammo"	Professor Griff; Beat Master Clay D.	4:28
6.	"Real African People 'Rap' Part 2"	Professor Griff; Kerwin "Sleek" Young	1:21
7.	"Love Thy Enemy"	Professor Griff; Kerwin "Sleek" Young	3:59
8.	"Rap Terrorist"	Professor Griff; Kerwin "Sleek" Young; Jim "Obie" O'Brien	2:33
9.	"1-900 Ste Oreo Type"	Professor Griff; Beat Master Clay D.	4:08
10.	"Last Asiatic Disciples"	Professor Griff; Beat Master Clay D.	4:13
11.	"The Word Of God Griff On Duty"	Professor Griff; Kerwin "Sleek" Young	3:15
12.	"The V Amendment"	Professor Griff; Kerwin "Sleek" Young; Jim "Obie" O'Brien	3:50
13.	"The Interview"	Professor Griff; Kerwin "Sleek" Young; Jim "Obie" O'Brien	4:06
14.	"It's A Blax Thanx"	Professor Griff	3:15

== Charts ==
Chart (1990)	Peak position
US Billboard 200	127
US Top R&B/Hip-Hop Albums (Billboard)	24
