= Dance All Night (Poison Clan song) =

Single by Poison Clan

from the album 2 Low Life Muthas
- Released: 1990
- Recorded: 1989
- Genre: Miami bass
- Length: 4:07
- Label: Luke Records
- Songwriter(s): JT Money, David Hobbs, Patrick Walter
- Producer(s): Mr. Mixx

"Dance All Night" is the second single by the Southern hip hop group Poison Clan from their 1990 debut album 2 Low Life Muthas. The song peaked at No. 14 on the Billboard Hot Rap Singles chart and No. 51 on the Hot R&B Singles chart. The song is fast paced and features the signature Miami bass sound that was pioneered by Poison Clan's labelmates the 2 Live Crew. The opening riff from Isaac Hayes' iconic Theme from Shaft is sampled very prominently throughout the entire song. It is the only Poison Clan single that was not edited for content due to being the only truly clean song Poison Clan recorded as there are no profanities anywhere in the entire song. Along with a 12-inch single and CD maxi-single, a music video was released for the song. The song was included on the group's 1999 greatest hits release The Best of JT Money & Poison Clan.
