= Disturb n tha Peace =

Studio album by Professor Griff
- Released: 1992
- Recorded: 1992
- Genre: Political hip hop
- Length: 51:17
- Label: Luke/Atlantic
- Producer: Professor Griff, Luke Skyywalker, Kavon Shah, DJ SZider, DJ Toomp

Professor Griff chronology
Kao's II Wiz*7*Dome (1991)	Disturb n tha Peace (1992)	Blood of the Profit (1998)

Disturb n tha Peace is the third album by the American musician Professor Griff. It was released on November 17, 1992, and was his final album released on Luke Records. The album was produced by Professor Griff, Luke Skyywalker, Kavon Shah, DJ Spider, DJ Toomp, Tone Control, Snake Eyez, and Society. Two singles were released, "Blackdraft" and "Sista, Sista," but neither charted. "Sista, Sista" is a tribute to Black mothers.

== Critical reception ==
Professional ratings
Review scores
Source	Rating
The Source	2.5/5 stars

The San Diego Union-Tribune wrote: "Religion and politics aside, Griff has produced an intriguing, funky album. He proves himself world-class as a rapper, producer and arranger, mixing the usual studio trickery and sampling with a tough-sounding band that gets Griff's anger over to great effect." The Sun Sentinel determined that the album "reveals a more mature raconteur who adroitly—and often humorously—exposes the absurd side of racial friction, while advocating black self-containment."

The Colorado Springs Gazette-Telegraph said that "the raps, stylishly put together and ringing with authority, are masterfully executed." The Manchester Evening News opined that "an unbridled hatred overwhelms any merit in Griff's arguments."

== Track listing ==
1. "The Least We Forget" - 0:56
2. "Blackdraft" (Marcus Effinger, Richard Griffin, Anthony Mills, Simonian) - 5:10
3. "Sense or Shit"- 0:20
4. "Color Confrontation" (Effinger, Mills) - 2:40
5. "Disturb n tha Peace" - 3:39
6. "2-Mintute War...Ning" - 2:00
7. "7 Wattz of Reality" - 3:42
8. "Respect tha Art-Kill-Tech" (Sean Devore, Griffin) - 4:20
9. "KKK-Vs-Doo Doo Brown" - 0:20
10. "God Bless AmeriKKKa" (Devore, Griffin) - 3:02
11. "Phuck the Media" (Effinger, Griffin) - 3:58
12. "Ti'ant No Bitch" - 0:15
13. "Sista, Sista" (Effinger, Griffin, Mills, Simonian) - 5:39
14. "Pre-Game Activity" (Griffin) - 1:00
15. "Rebelz Against the Develz" (Effinger, Griffin, Mills, Simonian) - 3:24
16. "43rd Negative Confession" (Shah) - 3:00
17. "Wlad" - 0:32
18. "107. Point Live" (At the Slave Theater) (Devore, Effinger, Griffin, Marcelin, Marcelin, Anthony Mills, Nixon) - 5:28
19. "Blax Thank, Pt. 3" - 1:52

== Personnel ==
- Niam Akbar – editing
- Luther Campbell – executive producer
- Dante Carfagna – producer
- Steve Cokely – editing
- Sean Devore – backing vocals
- DJ Spider – scratching
- DJ Toomp – scratching
- Cindy Doucett – backing vocals
- Cindy Douchett – backing vocals
- Louis Farrakhan – editing
- Keisha Gantt – backing vocals
- Richard Griffin – supervisor
- Charles Harrison – guitar, Bass, keyboards, vocals, backing vocals
- Christopher Harrison – guitar, bass, rhythm guitar, saxophone, vocals, backing vocals
- Ashra Kwesi – editing
- Jack "DJ Spider" Lalane – scratching
- Lord Jamar – voices
- Mike "Fresh" McCray – scratching
- M.G.T. – editing
- Eddie Miller – drums, engineer, mixing
- Milton Mizell – design
- Mike Mosby – editing
- Dr. Khallid Abdul Muhammad – editing
- Professor Griff – producer, compilation, mixing, concept, cover art concept
- Kavon Shah – producer
- Society – vocals, backing vocals, producer, compilation, mixing, cover art concept, illustrations
- Taqiyyah – editing
- Tone Control – scratching, producer
- Claudia Verela – backing vocals
- Dr. Frances Crews Weisings – editing
- Dramos Wilson – editing
- Harold Synclair "Snake Eyez" Wright – producer
