= 2 Low Life Muthas =

Studio album by Poison Clan
- Released: 1990
- Recorded: 1989−1990
- Genres: Rap, gangsta rap
- Length: 51:01
- Label: Effect
- Producer: Mr. Mixx

Poison Clan chronology
2 Low Life Muthas (1990)	Poisonous Mentality (1992)

Professional ratings
Review scores
Source	Rating
AllMusic	3/5 stars

2 Low Life Muthas is the debut album by the American rap group Poison Clan. It was released in 1990 by Effect Records, a division of Luke Records, and was produced by 2 Live Crew member Mr. Mixx. The album sold well in the South, and reached No. 42 on the Billboard Top R&B/Hip-Hop Albums chart. The singles, "The Bitch That I Hate" and "Dance All Night" peaked at peaked at Nos. 18 and 14 on the Hot Rap Singles chart, respectively.

== Track listing ==
- All songs written by P. Walter, J. Thompkins and D. Hobbs

No.	Title	Length
1.	"Low Life Mutha Fuckas"	4:32
2.	"Spoiled Rotten"	4:40
3.	"Jeri Curl"	4:19
4.	"The Bitch That I Hate"	4:34
5.	"Dance All Night"	4:07
6.	"Poison Freestyle" (featuring Brother Marquis and Tony MF Rock)	5:16
7.	"Flaugin'"	4:39
8.	"Bad Influence"	4:12
9.	"You Gets Nothin'"	4:49
10.	"The Neighborhood Haps"	2:51
11.	"Juveniles"	7:02

== Personnel ==
- Mr. Mixx – producer, mixing
- Sheena Moore – additional vocals
- Melissa Cooper – additional vocals
- Michael Sterling – recording engineer, mixing
- Ron Taylor – recording engineer, mixing
- Luther Campbell – executive producer
- Milton Mizell – cover design
