= Greatest Hits (Luke album) =

Greatest hits album by Luke
- Released: November 5, 1996
- Recorded: 1989–1996
- Genre: Hip-Hop
- Length: 56:08
- Label: Luke Records
- Producer: Darren “DJ Spin” Rudnick, Mike "Fresh" McCray, Devastator X, Clay-D

Luke chronology
| Greatest Hits (1996) | Luke's Freak Fest 2000 (2000) |

Professional ratings
Review scores
| Source | Rating |
|---|---|
| AllMusic | 4/5 stars |

Greatest Hits is the first compilation album released by Luke.

== Track listing ==
1. "It's Your Birthday" – 3:42
2. "Dr. Dre is a Bitch Ass" [Cowards in Compton Deathrow Remix] – 5:48
3. "Head, Head, & More Head, Pt. 1" – 4:01
4. "Breakdown" – 3:53
5. "Welcome to Club Hell" – 4:25
6. "Whatever" – 5:18
7. "Dance" – 3:28
8. "I Wanna Rock" – 4:38
9. "Come On" – 4:02
10. "Where Them Ho's At" – 3:08
11. "The Hop" – 3:46
12. "Bounce/Rock to the Beat" – 4:01
13. "Work It Out" – 3:08
14. "Lipstick on My Dick" – 2:50
