= Scandalous: The All Star Compilation =

Compilation album by Luke
- Released: November 19, 2002
- Recorded: 1990–2002
- Genre: Hip hop
- Label: Luke Records / Orpheus Music
- Producer: Luther Campbell, Darren "DJ Spin" Rudnick, Disco Rick, Doug E. Fresh, Mr. Mixx, Daz Dillinger

Luke chronology
| Luke's Freak Fest 2000 (2000) | Scandalous: The All Star Compilation (2002) |

Professional ratings
Review scores
| Source | Rating |
|---|---|
| Allmusic | 2.5/5 stars |

Scandalous: The All Star Compilation is a compilation album containing songs by Luther Campbell and a variety of other musicians including Big Punisher, Cam'ron and Trick Daddy.

== Track listing ==
1. "Slippery When It's Wet"- 4:32 (Featuring Big Punisher, Terror Squad)
2. "Suck This Dick"- 4:08 (Featuring Cam'ron)
3. "Hoes"- 4:59 (Featuring Snoop Dogg, Daz Dillinger, Kurupt)
4. "Could It Be"- 3:52 (Featuring HonoRebel, Shelly Diva)
5. "Ain't Spending Nuthin'"- 3:12 (Featuring Krayzie Bone)
6. "Hoe Stories"- 4:57 (Featuring Daz Dillinger, Sciryl)
7. "Scarred"- 3:26 (Featuring Trick Daddy)
8. "Bust a Nut"- 4:30 (Featuring The Notorious B.I.G.)
9. "Strokin'"- 4:17 (Featuring 69 Boyz)
10. "Freak Shawty"- 3:39 (Featuring Jayski)
11. "Freak"- 5:28 (Featuring Aaron Hall)
12. "Off da Hook"- 4:46 (Featuring Doug E. Fresh)
