= Uncle Al =

Uncle Al may refer to

- Albert Moss, a Miami disk jockey known as DJ Uncle Al
- Albert Lewis, host of the children's television program The Uncle Al Show broadcast from Cincinnati.
- Aleister Crowley
- Al Jourgensen, frontman of Ministry (band), an American industrial metal band, and co-owner of 13th Planet Records.
- The Alchemist (musician), American record producer and DJ
