= I Got Shit on My Mind =

1992 album by Luke

Studio album by Luke
- Released: February 11, 1992
- Recorded: 1991
- Genre: Hip hop; Miami bass; porn rap
- Length: 57:17
- Label: Luke Records; Atlantic
- Producer: Mike "Fresh" McCray

Luke chronology
The Luke LP (1990)	I Got Shit on My Mind (1992)	In the Nude (1993)

Professional ratings
Review scores
Source	Rating
AllMusic	link

I Got Shit on My Mind (alternatively titled I Got Sumthin' on My Mind) is the second studio album by American rapper Luke, and his first official solo album without the 2 Live Crew. It was released on March 24, 1992, through Luke Records and would be the last Luke album to be released through their distribution deal with Atlantic Records. The album, which was mainly produced by Mike "Fresh" McCray, peaked at #52 on the Billboard 200 chart and #20 on the Top R&B/Hip-Hop Albums chart.

== Packaging ==
The cover shows Luke holding a news paper while using a toilet which is partially covered by the parental advisory warning. To the right of Luke shows two nude women covering their breasts and genitals while they are in the shower.

== Track listing ==
1. "I Wanna Rock"- 6:44
2. "Fakin' Like Gangsters"- 4:37 *feat. JT Money
3. "Cisco"- 3:06
4. "I Ain't Bullshittin', Pt. IV"- 4:40
5. "Pussy Ass Kid and Hoe Ass Play (Payback Is a Mutha Fucker) [Kid 'n Play Diss]"- 4:29 *feat. Bust Down & JT Money
6. "Menage a Trois"- 5:08
7. "Ain't That a Bitch, Pt. I"- 7:25
8. "Breakdown"- 4:17
9. "Head, Head and More Head"- 4:41 *feat. JT Money & Jiggie Gee
10. "Sonia"- 3:24
11. "You and Me"- 6:17 *feat. Angee Griffin and H-Town
12. "One Black and a Bunch of Dirty White Boys"- 4:20
13. "News Cast"- 2:54
14. "Ain't That a Bitch, Pt. II"- 4:30
15. "Megamix"- 4:08

== Charts ==
=== Weekly charts ===
Chart (1992)	Peak position
US Billboard 200	52
US Top R&B/Hip-Hop Albums (Billboard)	20

=== Year-end charts ===
Chart (1992)	Position
US Top R&B/Hip-Hop Albums (Billboard)	49
