= Raise the Roof (Luke song) =

Single by Luke featuring No Good But So Good

from the album Changin' the Game
- Released: March 10, 1998
- Recorded: 1997
- Genre: Hip hop, Miami bass
- Length: 3:30
- Label: Luke / Island
- Songwriters: Luther Campbell, Darren Rudnick, John Barry
- Producers: Luther Campbell, Darren 'DJ Spin" Rudnick

Luke singles chronology
"Scarred" (1996)	"Raise the Roof" (1998)	"Luke's Shelia" (1998)

"Raise the Roof" is the lead single from Luke's sixth studio album, Changin' the Game. The song was produced and written by Luke himself and Darren "DJ Spin" Rudnick. The song sampled the "Theme from King Kong" for which legendary composer John Barry also received writing credits.

Upon its release in early 1998, "Raise the Roof" became Luke's biggest hit as a solo artist and his only one to reach the top 40, peaking at No. 26 on the Billboard Hot 100. The uptempo song featured rap group No Good But So Good and helped popularize the dance of the same name. By the summer of 1998, the single achieved gold status, reaching the feat on June 24, 1998 for sales of 500,000 copies, becoming Luke's only certified release as a solo artist. "Raise the Roof" also reached No. 90 on the Billboard Year-End Hot 100 singles of 1998 as one of the year's most popular singles.

The song's music video (directed by Dave Meyers) featured Luke and No Good But So Good performing the song in a night club and featured cameos from Stuart Scott, A.J. Johnson, Tyson Beckford, Sean "Puffy" Combs, Ice Cube, WC and Mack 10.

== Single track listing ==
1. "Raise the Roof" (Party Time Version)- 3:32
2. "Raise the Roof" (Game Time Version)- 3:32
3. "Raise the Roof" (Instrumental)- 3:23

== Charts and certifications ==
=== Weekly charts ===
Chart (1998)	Peak position
Billboard Hot 100	26
Billboard Hot R&B/Hip-Hop Singles & Tracks	20
Billboard Hot Rap Singles	1
Billboard Hot Dance Music/Maxi-Singles Sales	21

=== Year-end charts ===
Chart (1998)	Position
U.S. Billboard Hot 100	90

=== Certifications ===
Region	Certification	Certified units/sales
United States (RIAA)	Gold	600,000
