= Somethin' Nasty =

Studio album by Uncle Luke
- Released: March 13, 2001
- Recorded: 2000–01
- Genre: Dirty rap
- Length: 1:17:11
- Label: Luke; KELA
- Producer: Luke (also exec.); Daz Dillinger; Mr. Mixx; Darren " DJ Spin" Rudnick; The Committee

Uncle Luke chronology
Changin' the Game (1997)	Somethin' Nasty (2001)	My Life & Freaky Times (2006)

Professional ratings
Review scores
Source	Rating
AllMusic	1.5/5 stars

Somethin' Nasty is the seventh studio album by American rapper Uncle Luke. It was released on March 13, 2001 through Luke Records/Koch Entertainment Label Alliance. Production was handled by Darren “DJ Spin” Rudnick, Mr. Mixx, Daz Dillinger, Gorilla Tek, and Luke himself. It features guest appearances from Sporty G, Pitbull, Jiggie Gee, Daz Dillinger, No Love, Cam'ron, Kurupt, Lil Zane, Snoop Dogg, HonoRebel, Shelly Diva, Sciryl, Kid Capri, DJ Kizzy Rock and DJ Smurf. The album peaked at #149 on the Billboard 200, #36 on the Top R&B/Hip-Hop Albums and #6 on the Independent Albums. This album features the debut of Pitbull, who appears on "Roll Wit Luke", "Suck This Dick", and "Lollipop".

== Track listing ==
No.	Title	Length
1.	"Intro"	0:45
2.	"Roll Wit Luke" (featuring Sporty G, Pitbull, Jiggle Gee and No Love)	4:02
3.	"Holla" (featuring Sporty G)	3:31
4.	"Freaky Red Skit"	0:16
5.	"Suck This Dick" (featuring Cam'ron and Pitbull)	4:08
6.	"Hoes" (featuring Snoop Dogg and Tha Dogg Pound)	5:00
7.	"Lollipop" (featuring Pitbull and Lil' Zane)	4:07
8.	"No Rubber"	0:41
9.	"Fat Girls"	3:45
10.	"The Show"	3:14
11.	"We Want Some Head"	3:54
12.	"Kiss Each Other Skit"	1:05
13.	"Could It Be" (featuring Shelly Diva and HonoRebel)	3:52
14.	"If It Wasn't 4 Us" (featuring Sporty G)	4:31
15.	"Eat the Pussy Skit"	0:15
16.	"Eat the Pussy"	4:06
17.	"Hoe Stories" (featuring Daz Dillinger and Sciryl)	4:57
18.	"Talkin' Shit"	4:38
19.	"Capri Skit"	0:23
20.	"Party Don't Start" (featuring Kid Capri and Jiggle Gee)	3:54
21.	"B-Otch" (featuring DJ Smurf and DJ Kizzy Rock)	4:10
22.	"Big Dick Skit"	0:18
23.	"We Want Big Dick"	3:39
24.	"Save Me from the Devil"	4:24
25.	"Outro"	3:36
Total length:		1:17:11

== Charts ==
Chart (2001)	Peak position
US Billboard 200	149
US Top R&B/Hip-Hop Albums (Billboard)	36
US Independent Albums (Billboard)	6
