= My Life & Freaky Times =

Studio album by Uncle Luke
- Released: March 7, 2006
- Recorded: 2005–2006
- Genre: Hip-Hop, Miami bass
- Label: Virgin, Luke
- Producer: Boy Wonder, Luther Campbell, Danny D, Nikki D, Petey Pablo

Uncle Luke chronology
Somethin' Nasty (2001)	My Life & Freaky Times (2006)

Professional ratings
Review scores
Source	Rating
Allmusic	3/5 stars

My Life & Freaky Times is the eighth and final album released by Uncle Luke. It was released on March 7, 2006 through Virgin Records and featured production from Luke himself, Petey Pablo and Nikki D, among others. The album was not much of a success, peaking at just #35 on the Top R&B/Hip-Hop Albums. My Life & Freaky Times was a 3-disc set and was said to be the last album Luke would release as a recording artist.

== Track listing ==
- Disc 1
1. "Luke's Public Address"- 1:57
2. "I Got Somethin' (My Baby Can Dance To)"- 3:22
3. "Move Something"- 4:07 (Featuring Trick Daddy, Jacki-O)
4. "Pop That Pussy"- 3:13
5. "Shake That" (Featuring Jolli Boi) - 2:54
6. "Anytime, Anyplace"- 1:43
7. "Archy Breaky"- 3:57
8. "Holla at Cha Homeboy"- 3:33 (Featuring Petey Pablo, Pitbull)
9. "Oh My God"- 4:02 (Featuring Rick Ross)
10. "South Beach Bitches"- 0:19
11. "Sponge Bob"- 2:54
12. "Let the Monkey Out"- 3:09
13. "Bad Moral Bitches"- 0:09
14. "We Don't Give a Damn"- 3:46 (Featuring Petey Pablo, Big Tigger)
15. "Get on Down"- 3:41
16. "Spanish Joke"- 0:55
17. "Nice and Slow"- 4:22
18. "One & One"- 2:08
19. "Work Wit It"- 3:17
20. "Mega Mix"- 3:43
21. "Haitian Gangsta"- 0:43
22. "Pop That Pussy"- 4:56
23. "Outro"- 2:00
- Disc 2
1. "Foreplay aka the Introduction"- 1:01
2. "Glory Days Luke Dancers, Pt. 1"- 3:38
3. "Glory Days Luke Dancers, Pt. 2"- 8:30
4. "Trick and Treat Luke Dancers, Pt. 3"- 4:40
5. "Hoes and Stage Shows"- 4:32
6. "Groupie Love, Groupie Hate"- 3:03
7. "Groupie Bus"- 8:29
8. "The Luke Lowdown"- 4:56
9. "Sex and the Rap Business"- 2:14
10. "Golden Shower"- 2:55
11. "Luke vs. Suge and Snoop"- 5:23
12. "The Best of Uncle Luke's Freak Shows"- 3:52
13. "Tupac on the Peep Show"- 4:38
14. "Notorious B.I.G. on the Peep Show"- 1:16
15. "R&B Celebrity Freaks"- 2:45
16. "Horny-Weight Champion of the World"- 2:13
17. "A List Celebrities, Triple X Obsessions"- 2:45
- Disc 3
1. "Luke and Mike Tyson: Saved by Pussy, Pt. 1"- 6:56
2. "Luke and Ray Lewis: Saved by Pussy, Pt. 2"- 6:54
3. "Pussy Pitfalls and Professional Football"- 12:19
4. "Hurricane Luke"- 10:18
5. "Pimpin' the Prosecution"- 4:45
6. "Courtroom Craziness"- 4:58
7. "Golden Shower Weekend"- 6:38
8. "Beauty and the Bestiality"- 6:43
