= Uncle Luke (album) =

Studio album by Luke
- Released: May 14, 1996
- Recorded: 1995–96
- Genre: Miami bass; dirty rap
- Length: 1:14:06
- Label: Luther Campbell Music
- Producer: Hiriam Hicks (exec.) Luke; (Also exec.); Darren "DJ Spin" Rudnick; Doug E. Fresh; Frankie Cutlass; Ice Cube; Rick & Jody; Rick Smith Entertainment; Rod XL; S.M.K. Sean Pross; Todd Terry

Luke chronology
Freak for Life (1994)	Uncle Luke (1996)	Changin' the Game (1997)

Singles from Uncle Luke
- 1. "Scarred" Released: April 2, 1996; 2. "Bounce to Da Beat" Released: October 15, 1996

Professional ratings
Review scores
Source	Rating
AllMusic	2.5/5 stars

Uncle Luke is the fifth studio album released by American rapper Luke. It was released on May 14, 1996, via Luther Campbell Music. Production was handled by Darren "DJ Spin" Rudnick, Rod XL, Doug E. Fresh, Frankie Cutlass, Ice Cube, Rick Smith Entertainment, Rick & Jody, S.M.K. Sean Pross and Todd Terry, with Hiriam Hicks serving as executive producer. It features guest appearances from Trick Daddy, Doug E. Fresh, Ice Cube, Lil Hop, The Notorious B.I.G. and Verb.

Uncle Luke was joint-distributed through Alliance Entertainment Corporation and the Island Black Music division of Island Records (though they weren't directly mentioned in name) and is the first and only Luke solo album released under the temporary new umbrella name, Luther Campbell Music after Luke Records went into bankruptcy, sold its catalog to Joseph "Lil' Joe" Weinberger (ultimately forming Lil' Joe Records) and went under reconstruction. The Luke Records name was almost instantly reinstated months later.

Uncle Luke peaked at number 51 on the Billboard 200 and number 8 on the Top R&B/Hip-Hop Albums chart. The single, "Scarred", made it to No. 64 on the Billboard Hot 100 and No. 7 on the Hot Rap Singles chart.

== Track listing ==
No.	Title	Producer(s)	Length
1.	"Intro"		1:46
2.	"Scarred" (featuring Verb and Trick Daddy)	Darren "D.J. Spin" Rudnick	3:27
3.	"The Interview"		0:31
4.	"Bust a Nut" (featuring The Notorious B.I.G.)	Frankie Cutlass	4:29
5.	"Dick in Mouth"		0:29
6.	"Bounce to da Beat"	Darren "D.J. Spin" Rudnick	3:24
7.	"Never Forget from Whence You Came"	Rick Smith Entertainment	4:46
8.	"Freaks on the Radio"		0:41
9.	"Freaky Bitches"	Rod XL	4:36
10.	"Interview, Pt. 2"		0:19
11.	"Luke Megamix"	Rod XL	3:12
12.	"Asshole Naked" (featuring Ice Cube)	Ice Cube	4:56
13.	"Marvin's Comedy Show"		1:00
14.	"Do-It Do-It" (featuring Lil Hop)	Rod XL	3:33
15.	"In the News"		0:51
16.	"Work It Baby"	Darren "D.J. Spin" Rudnick	3:35
17.	"To Have a Dick"		0:30
18.	"Bone"	Sean "SMK" Pross	4:59
19.	"T.K. The Pussyologist"		1:39
20.	"R U Ready"	Rick & Jody	4:45
21.	"Ol' G" (featuring Trick Daddy)	Rod XL	4:10
22.	"911"		1:33
23.	"Off da Hook" (featuring Doug E. Fresh)	Doug E. Fresh; Todd Terry	4:44
24.	"Out da Closet"		1:15
25.	"Straight Beef"	Sean "SMK" Pross	4:06
26.	"Shout Outs"	Darren "D.J. Spin" Rudnick	4:51
Total length:			1:14:06

== Charts ==
Chart (1996)	Peak position
US Billboard 200	51
US Top R&B/Hip-Hop Albums (Billboard)	8
