= Freak for Life =

Freak for Life 6996

Studio album by Luke
- Released: July 12, 1994
- Recorded: 1993–94
- Studio: Luke Recording Studio (Liberty City, FL)
- Genre: Hip hop; bass music
- Length: 67:45
- Label: Luke Records
- Producer: Luke (exec.); Darren "DJ Spin" Rudnick; DJ Laz; DJ Slice; Eddie Miller; Mike "Fresh" McCray

Luke chronology
In the Nude (1993)	Freak for Life 6996 (1994)	Uncle Luke (1996)

Singles from Freak for Life 6996
- 1. "It's Your Birthday" Released: June 28, 1994; 2. "Where Them Hoe's At" Released: October 11, 1994

Professional ratings
Review scores
Source	Rating
AllMusic	2/5 stars
RapReviews	5/10

Freak for Life 6996 (known to some as simply Freak For Life) is the fourth studio album by American rapper Luke. It was released on July 12, 1994 through Luke Records. Recording sessions took place at Luke Recording Studio in Liberty City, Florida. Production was handled by Mike "Fresh" McCray, DJ Slice, Darren "DJ Spin" Rudnick, DJ Laz and Eddie Miller, with Luke serving as executive producer. It features guest appearances from JT Money, Home Team, Fresh Kid Ice, Likkle Wicked, Trellini and Verb.

The album peaked at #174 on the Billboard 200 and #24 on the Top R&B/Hip-Hop Albums, making it his lowest charting album at the time. One single found mild success, "It's Your Birthday" peaked at #33 on the Hot Rap Singles and #91 on the Hot R&B/Hip-Hop Singles & Tracks.

Freak For Life 6996 is the last Luke's solo album to be released under Luke Records independently before it went into bankruptcy. This album is now the property of Lil' Joe Records, who owns the pre-1996 Luke Records catalog.

== Track listing ==
No.	Title	Producer(s)	Length
1.	"Freak for Life"	Mike "Fresh" McCray	2:27
2.	"It's Your Birthday"	Darren "D.J. Spin" Rudnick	3:49
3.	"Beat Your Lover"		1:39
4.	"That's How I Feel" (featuring JT Money)	Mike "Fresh" McCray	3:26
5.	"Come On"	Darren "D.J. Spin" Rudnick	3:34
6.	"Clip on Clicks"		1:18
7.	"Megamix"	DJ Laz	5:19
8.	"Where's the Tittie"		1:11
9.	"Some Ol Bullshit"	DJ Slice	4:24
10.	"You Have Been Bad"		1:17
11.	"Pre-Masterbatorial"	DJ Slice	4:37
12.	"Anal Sex"		1:39
13.	"Where Them Ho's At"	DJ Laz	3:07
14.	"Represent" (featuring Fresh Kid Ice, Verb, JT Money and Home Team)	Mike "Fresh" McCray	4:14
15.	"We Are the Weave"		1:10
16.	"All My Ex's"	Eddie Miller	3:22
17.	"Out of Control"		1:50
18.	"Freaky Business"	Mike "Fresh" McCray	3:17
19.	"Got to Get Some Work Done"		0:38
20.	"Welcome to the Quiet Storm" (featuring Trellini)	Eddie Miller	4:45
21.	"Cool (Some Cool Shit)"	DJ Slice	3:48
22.	"JC's Detailed Car Wash"		1:24
23.	"Movin' Along" (featuring JT Money, Home Team and Likkle Wicked)	Mike "Fresh" McCray	5:05
24.	"Beat Your Lover (Reprise)"		9:33
Total length:			1:07:45

== Charts ==
Chart (1994)	Peak position
US Billboard 200	174
US Top R&B/Hip-Hop Albums (Billboard)	24
