= Poisonous Mentality =

Studio album by Poison Clan
- Released: April 7, 1992
- Genre: Hip-hop
- Length: 59:26
- Label: Effect
- Producer: Devastator X; Eddie Miller; JT Money; Mike Fresh; Nivek

Poison Clan chronology
2 Low Life Muthas (1990)	Poisonous Mentality (1992)	Ruff Town Behavior (1993)

Professional ratings
Review scores
Source	Rating
AllMusic	4/5 stars

Poisonous Mentality is the second studio album by American hip-hop group Poison Clan. It was released on April 7, 1992, via Effect Records. Produced by Mike Fresh, JT Money, Nivek, Devastator X and Eddie Miller, it features additional vocals from Bustdown, Debbie Bennett, Devastator X, Uncle Luke and Madball. The album peaked at number 62 on the Top R&B/Hip-Hop Albums chart and number 20 on the Heatseekers Albums charts in the United States. Member Debonaire had departed from the group.

== Track listing ==
All tracks are written by Jeffrey Thompkins, except track 19 written with Eddie Miller.

No.	Title	Producer(s)	Length
1.	"JT's Dream"	Mike Fresh	2:46
2.	"Inside Edition"	Mike Fresh	2:49
3.	"All They Good 4"	Mike Fresh	3:11
4.	"Uzi Gets Shot"	Mike Fresh	0:18
5.	"Action"	Mike Fresh	3:14
6.	"Livin' in the City"	Mike Fresh	3:54
7.	"Raymond up the Road"	Mike Fresh	0:18
8.	"Fugitive"	Mike Fresh	3:15
9.	"Ho' Stories"	Mike Fresh	3:20
10.	"JT's Confession"	Mike Fresh	0:39
11.	"I Hate Ho's"	Mike Fresh	3:12
12.	"Drugz Bullshittin'"	Mike Fresh	0:15
13.	"Rough Nigga Gettin' Busy"	Mike Fresh	4:26
14.	"The Tip on Madball"	Mike Fresh	0:28
15.	"Some Shit I Used to Do"	Mike Fresh	4:00
16.	"That Was Ram"	Mike Fresh	0:40
17.	"Groove With the PC"	Mike Fresh	3:53
18.	"JT Ole Boy"	Mike Fresh	0:09
19.	"No Haps"	Eddie Miller	4:43
20.	"Shake Whatcha' Mama Gave Ya'"	Devastator X	3:24
21.	"Big Nose"	Mike Fresh	0:35
22.	"Something' 4 You Raggedy Ho's"	JT Money; Nivek	4:14
23.	"Shorty T in Madballs's Basement"	Mike Fresh	0:20
24.	"Shout Outs"	JT Money; Nivek	5:23
Total length:			59:26

== Personnel ==
- Jeff "JT Money" Thompkins – songwriter, producer (tracks: 22, 24)
- Debbie Bennett – additional vocals (track 2)
- Luther "Uncle Luke" Campbell – additional vocals (track 8), executive producer
- Eddie Miller – songwriter & producer (track 19), mixing, engineering
- Kenneth "Devastator X" Terry – additional vocals & producer (track 20)
- John "Bust Down" Bickham Jr. – additional vocals (track 22)
- Steve "Madball" Watson – additional vocals (track 22)
- Michael "Mike Fresh" McCray – producer (tracks: 1–18, 21, 23)
- Nivek – producer (tracks: 22, 24)
- Milton Mizell – graphic design
- Mark Hartshorn – photography

== Charts ==
Chart (1992)	Peak position
US Top R&B/Hip-Hop Albums (Billboard)	62
