= And the Word Became Flesh =

And The Word Became Flesh

Studio album by Professor Griff
- Released: September 11, 2001
- Recorded: 2001
- Genre: Political Rap; Hardcore rap
- Label: The Right Stuff/Capitol/EMI Records; 7243 5 29319 2 7 T2-29319
- Producer: Professor Griff; Chuck D Kerwin "Sleek" Young

Professor Griff chronology
Blood of the Profit (1998)	And The Word Became Flesh (2001)

Professional ratings
Review scores
Source	Rating
Allmusic	2/5 stars
Rapreviews.com	7.5/10
Robert Christgau	(dud)

And the Word Became Flesh is the fifth album by emcee Professor Griff, which was released on September 11, 2001, on the Right Stuff Records and was produced by Professor Griff and Chuck D. The album did not make it to any of the Billboard charts or produce any hit singles. Chuck D, Umar Bin Hassan, and Kerwin "Sleek" Young made guest appearances.

== Track listing ==
1. "W.O.R.D.S." (Without Really Doing Shit)- 1:45
2. "Blood of the Profit"- 2:50
3. "A.I.D.S."- 1:14
4. "F.U.N.K."- 2:18
5. "European on Me" feat. Umar Bin Hassan- 3:50
6. "Imagination"- 6:29
7. "Hypocrites" feat. Chuck D- 3:42
8. "R.A.P." (Real African People), Pt. 1-2- 4:52
9. "T.H.I.N.K."- 4:16
10. "Skit #1"- 0:14
11. "Sudden Death"- 2:52
12. "Skit #2"- :19
13. "It Ain't Right"- 2:26
14. "Skit #3"- 0:16
15. "Horizontal Heroin"- 1:48
16. "Skit #4"- 0:29
17. "Black Beauty and the Bitch"- 6:59
18. "G.O.D." (Griff on Duty)- 4:19
19. "The Late, Great Blackman, Pt. 1" featuring Kerwin "Sleek" Young- 2:33
20. "Man O Man"- 3:10
21. "The Late, Great Blackman, Pt. 2" featuring Kerwin "Sleek" Young- 3:17
22. "43rd Negative Confession"- 4:11
23. "I am a Poet"- 4:47
24. "W.O.R.D.S., Pt. 2"- 1:14
