= Changin' the Game =

Studio album by Luke
- Released: November 11, 1997
- Recorded: 1997
- Genre: Southern hip hop; dirty rap
- Length: 54:46
- Label: Luke Records; Island Black Music
- Producer: Hiriam Hicks (exec.); Luke (also exec.); Darren " DJ Spin" Rudnick; Danny Spohn; Derrick Hill; Gusto; Lil' Jon; Louis "Ugly" Howard; Rod XL; Tony Galvin

Luke chronology
Uncle Luke (1996)	Changin' the Game (1997)	Somethin' Nasty (2001)

Singles from Changin' the Game
- 1. "Luke's Sheila" Released: 1997; 2. "Raise the Roof" Released: March 10, 1998

Professional ratings
Review scores
Source	Rating
AllMusic	4/5 stars
Entertainment Weekly	D
The Source	3.5/5 stars

Changin' the Game is the sixth studio album by American rapper and record producer Uncle Luke. It was released on November 11, 1997 through Luke Records/Island Black Music. Production was handled by Darren “DJ Spin” Rudnick, Danny Spohn, Derrick Hill, Gusto, Lil' Jon, Louis "Ugly" Howard, Rod XL, Tony Galvin, and Luke himself, who also served as executive producer together with Hiriam Hicks. It features guest appearances from No Good-N-Jiggie, Aaron Hall, Melvin Riley and Choclatt. The album peaked at number 49 on the US Billboard Top R&B/Hip-Hop Albums chart. However, the single "Raise the Roof" found success reaching No. 26 on the Billboard Hot 100 and topped the Hot Rap Singles. The song helped to popularize the arm gesture by the same name which involved repeatedly extending ones arms upwards with the palms of the hands also facing upwards. The song is also featured in the 1998 compilation album Jock Jams, Volume 4.

== Track listing ==
No.	Title	Producer(s)	Length
1.	"Intro"	Luke; Tony Galvin	1:05
2.	"Freak" (featuring Aaron Hall)	Luke; Tony Galvin	5:27
3.	"Wanda Smith (Interlude #1)"		0:24
4.	"Baby Girl" (featuring No Good But So Good)	Luke, Darren "DJ Spin" Rudnick	4:10
5.	"Sheryl Underwood (Interlude #2)"		0:16
6.	"Like This, Like That" (featuring Jiggie Gee)	Lil' Jon	3:51
7.	"Sommore #2"		0:38
8.	"Luke's Sheila" (featuring Melvin Riley)	Lil' Jon	4:30
9.	"Sommore #1 (Interlude #2)"		0:37
10.	"Live at Freaknik"	Lil' Jon; Danny Spohn	3:35
11.	"Raise the Roof" (featuring No Good But So Good)	Luke, Darren "DJ Spin" Rudnick	3:30
12.	"Marvin Dixon (Interlude #5)"		0:48
13.	"Squirrel"	Luke	3:30
14.	"Let's Ride" (featuring No Good But So Good and Jiggie Gee)	Luke, Darren "DJ Spin" Rudnick	3:29
15.	"Guest List"	Derrick Hill; Louis "Ugly" Howard	3:08
16.	"Megamix"	Rod XL	5:49
17.	"Shout Outs"	Luke; Gusto	4:52
18.	"Outro"	Luke; Tony Galvin	1:07
19.	"Luke's Sheila (Frank Delour Remix)" (featuring Choclatt)	Lil' Jon	4:00
Total length:			54:46

== Charts ==
Chart (1997)	Peak position
US Top R&B/Hip-Hop Albums (Billboard)	49
