= Blood of the Profit =

Studio album by Professor Griff
- Released: August 18, 1998
- Recorded: 1998
- Genre: Political hip hop Hardcore hip hop
- Length: 43:45
- Label: Lethal/Blackheart/Mercury
- Producer: Professor Griff; Chuck D Kerwin Young

Professor Griff chronology
Disturb N Tha Peace (1992)	Blood of the Profit (1998)	And The Word Became Flesh (2001)

Professional ratings
Review scores
Source	Rating
AllMusic	2.5/5 stars
Robert Christgau	D

Blood of the Profit is an album by the American rapper Professor Griff. It was released in 1998 on Lethal/Blackheart/Mercury, and was produced by Professor Griff and Chuck D. The single, "The Ole Bitch-U-Worryz," which featured Chuck D, made it to No. 16 on the Hot Rap Singles and No. 66 on the Hot R&B/Hip-Hop Singles & Tracks.

The album was released a few months after Professor Griff rejoined Public Enemy. Its lyrical content was inspired by the deaths of Tupac Shakur and the Notorious B.I.G.

== Track listing ==
1. "Red Reign"- 1:13
2. "The Ole Bitch-U-Worryz" feat. Chuck D- 4:21
3. "Common Thread"- 4:31
4. "Bitch Skit"- 0:16
5. "Black Beauty & the Bitch"- 4:03
6. "Vicious Cycle"- 4:08
7. "Where U At?"- 5:04
8. "Rosez n Thornz"- 5:31
9. "Blood of the Profit"- 1:07
10. "Field Nigguhz in a Huddle"- 4:26
11. "Imaginenation"- 5:03
12. "Point Blank"- 4:25
13. "The X-Y Chromozone Theory"- 4:03
