= The Best of JT Money & Poison Clan =

The Best of JT Money & the Poison Clan

Greatest hits album by Poison Clan
- Released: June 29, 1999
- Recorded: 1990–1995
- Genre: Southern hip hop, dirty rap, Miami bass, hardcore hip hop
- Length: 61:40
- Label: Luke Records
- Producer: Luther Campbell, Mike "Fresh" McCray, JT Money

Poison Clan chronology
Strait Zooism (1995)	The Best of JT Money & the Poison Clan (1999)

Professional ratings
Review scores
Source	Rating
AllMusic	4/5 stars

The Best of JT Money & the Poison Clan is a compilation album released by Luke Records containing the greatest hits from the group, Poison Clan. The album peaked at No. 82 on the Billboard Top R&B/Hip-Hop Albums chart.

== Track listing ==
1. "Low Life Mutha Fuckas"- 4:45
2. "In My Nature"- 4:30
3. "The Bitch That I Hate"- 4:34
4. "Groove With the Poison Clan"- 3:54
5. "Shake Whatcha Mama Gave Ya"- 3:22
6. "Dance All Night"- 4:57
7. "Put Shit Past No Ho"- 4:12
8. "Fakin' Like Gangsters"- 3:52
9. "Action"- 4:17
10. "I Hate Hoes"- 3:14
11. "Poison Freestyle"- 5:17
12. "Check Out the Ave., Pt. 1"- 3:18
13. "Check Out the Ave., Pt. 2"- 3:00
14. "Head Head & More Head, Pt. 1"- 4:20
15. "Head Head & More Head, Pt. 2"- 4:31
16. "Get It Girl"- 6:01
17. "Pick It Up"- 3:01
18. "Dance All Night"- 4:55
19. "Throw the P"- 3:09
20. "Shake Whatcha Mama Gave Ya"- 3:11
21. "You Go Girl"- 3:58
22. "Everybody Say Yeah"- 4:14
23. "Wiggle Wiggle"- 3:47
24. "Jealous Girls"- 3:56
25. " Nasty Bitch"- 6:36
26. "Sheryl & Donna"- 3:14
27. "Mega Mixx"- 10:40
