= Jess Wright =

English television personality, model, singer and businesswoman

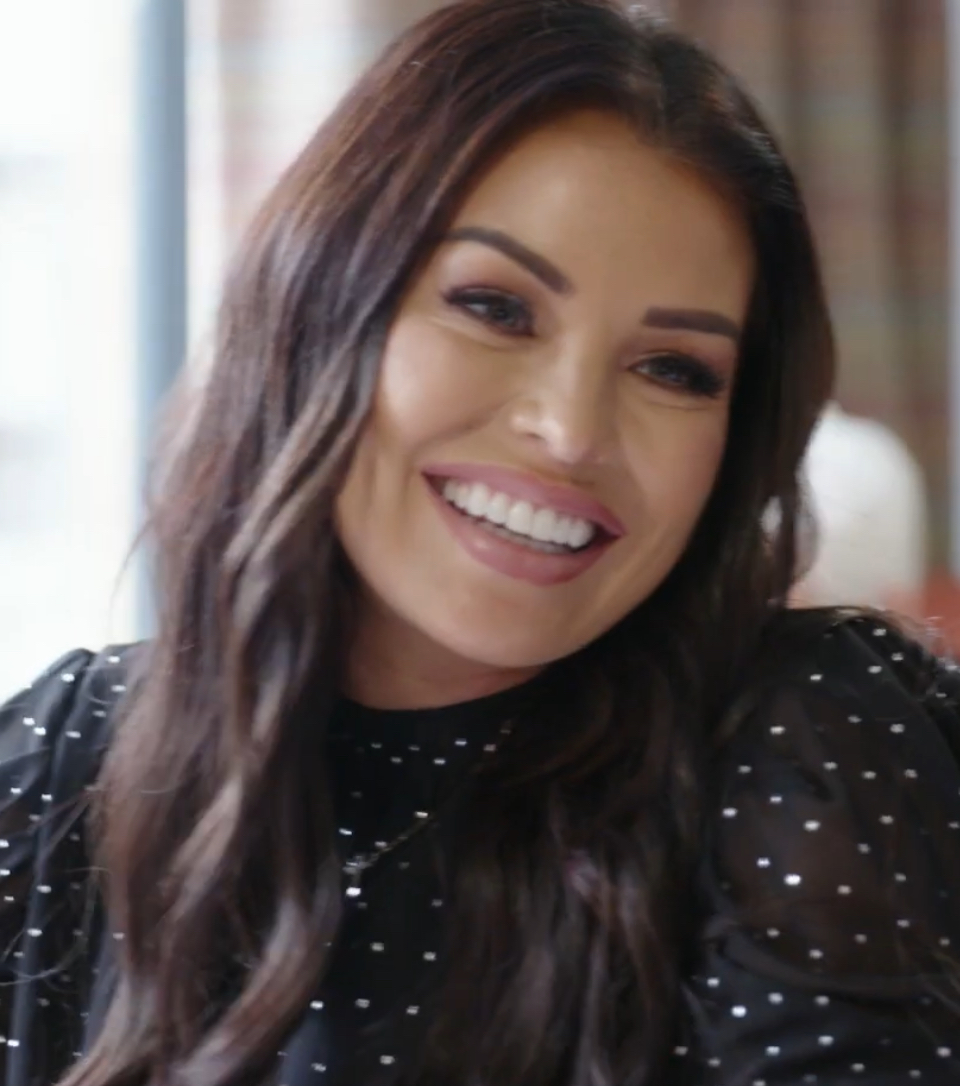
- Wright in 2019
- Born: Jessica Sophia Wright; 14 September 1985 (age 41); Tower Hamlets, London, England
- Occupations: Television personality; singer
- Years active: 2010–present
- Spouse: William Lee-Kemp (m. 2021)
- Children: 1
- Relatives: Mark Wright (brother); Josh Wright (brother); Elliott Wright (cousin); Michelle Keegan (sister-in-law)
- Musical career
- Genres: Pop; dance
- Label: All Around the World

Jessica Sophia Wright (born 14 September 1985) is an English television personality and former singer. From 2010 to 2016, she appeared in the ITVBe reality series The Only Way Is Essex. Throughout her time on the series, she pursued a music career, notably releasing the single "Dance All Night". Since leaving the series, she has competed in various series including Dance Dance Dance, Celebrity Karaoke Club and Cooking with the Stars. She also co-hosts the Wright at Home podcast alongside her sister and mother.

== Early life ==
Jessica Sophia Wright was born on 14 September 1985 in the London Borough of Tower Hamlets. She is the elder daughter of Bernard and Mark Wright Sr, as well as the sister of Mark, Josh Wright and Natalya, the cousin of Elliott Wright and Leah Wright, and the granddaughter of Patricia Brooker. She went to Bancroft's School in Woodford Green, which she has credited with nurturing her dream to work in entertainment. She has a degree in Business and Marketing Management from the University of Westminster.

== Career ==
In 2010, Wright was cast alongside her family on the ITV reality series The Only Way Is Essex. In December 2011, the cast of The Only Way Is Essex released a cover of the Wham! song "Last Christmas", with their own version of the show's theme song, "The Only Way Is Up" by Yazz, as the single's B-side. In 2012, Wright signed a three-single deal with All Around the World. She later went to Marbella to film a music video for her debut single, "Dance All Night", which was released on 16 September 2012 and peaked at number 36 on the UK Singles Chart. Wright released her second single, "Dominoes", featuring Mann on 17 February 2013, which charted on the UK Official Dance Chart at number 36. Wright then released a further track, "Come With Me", in June 2013, as part of Clubland 23.

In 2016, after appearing in 16 series, she announced her departure from The Only Way Is Essex. Wright returned for one episode five months later to visit friend Bobby Norris, following the death of his dog. A year after her exit, she competed on Dance Dance Dance; she was the second to be eliminated. In 2020, she was a contestant on the first series of Celebrity Karaoke Club. Then in 2025, she competed in the fifth series of the ITV cooking competition series Cooking with the Stars. She was eliminated first. Also in 2025, Wright began fronting the Wright at Home podcast alongside mother Carol and sister Natalya. An episode of their podcast garnered controversy in March 2026 after the three made "degrading" comments about women who wear thong bikinis. They later apologised for their comments.

== Personal life ==
Wright was in a relationship with her fellow The Only Way Is Essex co-star Ricky Rayment between 2012 and 2014. She married William Lee-Kemp in 2021 and she gave birth to her first child, a boy, in May 2022.

== Filmography ==
As herself
Year	Title	Notes
2010–2016	The Only Way Is Essex	Main cast
2015	Celebrity Juice	Panellist
2017	Dance Dance Dance	Contestant; fourth place
2020	Celebrity Karaoke Club	Contestant; fourth place
2025	Cooking with the Stars	Contestant; eighth place

== Discography ==
=== Singles ===
Title	Year	Peak chart positions
Title	Year	UK
"Dance All Night"	2012	36
"Dominoes" (featuring Mann)	2013	–
"Come with Me"	2013	–
"—" denotes a recording that failed to chart, was ineligible for the chart, or was not released.
