= No Good (group) =

American hip hop group

- Also known as: No Good but So Good
- Origin: Miami, Florida
- Genres: Hip hop
- Years active: 1992–2005
- Labels: Loud, Priority, Artistdirect
- Past members: Mr. Fatal; T-Nasty; Slo

No Good (previously known as No Good but So Good) was an American hip hop group from Miami, Florida. The group was formed by Derrick "Mr. Fatal" Hill, Tracy "T-Nasty" Lattimer and John "Slo" Strachtan. Strachtan later departed the group, and No Good continued as a duo.

== History ==
Derrick Hill, Tracy Lattimer and John Strachtan started working in 1992 as dancers and hype men for rapper Luther "Luke" Campbell. They later formed No Good But So Good in 1992 as a dance troupe, eventually making a shift into rap music. They gained much hype in their hometown of Miami, performing in local clubs. Up to No Good, their debut studio album, was produced by Campbell and released in December 1996. Two singles—"Get Your Shake On" and "Six O'Clock in the Morning"—were released from the album. In 1998, No Good But So Good were featured on Luke's single "Raise the Roof", which peaked at number 26 on the US Billboard Hot 100. Strachtan later departed the group, and the group's remaining two members shortened their name to No Good. The duo found success with the 1998 single "Lizard, Lizard", a collaboration with rapper Jiggie, which became a top ten hit on the Billboard Hot Rap Songs chart. No Good and Jiggie collaborated for the studio album Lizard Lizard, which was released in February 1999. The duo later signed to Artistdirect Records and released their third studio album Gameday, PBB in May 2002. The album spawned the hit single "Ballin' Boy", which gave the group their second number-one hit on the Hot Rap Songs chart.

== Discography ==
=== Studio albums ===
List of studio albums
Title	Album details
Up to No Good	Release: December 3, 1996 (US); Label: Loud, Priority; Formats: CD, cassette, LP
Lizard Lizard (with Jiggie)	Release: February 9, 1999 (US); Label: Loud, RCA; Formats: CD, cassette, LP
Gameday, PBB	Release: May 21, 2002 (US); Label: Artistdirect; Formats: CD, LP

=== Singles ===
List of singles, with selected chart positions, showing year released and album name
Title	Year	Peak chart positions				Album
Title	Year	US	US Dance	US R&B	US Rap	Album
"Get Your Shake On"	1996	—	—	—	—	Up to No Good
"Six O'Clock in the Morning"	1997	—	—	—	—	Up to No Good
"Raise the Roof" (Luke featuring No Good)	1998	26	21	20	1	Changin' the Game
"Lizard Lizard" (with Jiggie, featuring Luke)	1998	—	—	66	9	Lizard Lizard
"Ballin' Boy"	2002	—	—	54	1	Gameday, PBB
"—" denotes a recording that did not chart or was not released in that territory.
