= Banned in the U.S.A. =

Banned in the U.S.A.: The Luke LP

Studio album by Luke featuring the 2 Live Crew
- Released: July 24, 1990
- Recorded: 1989–1990
- Genres: Miami bass; dirty rap
- Length: 63:19
- Labels: Luke; Atlantic
- Producers: Big Tony Fisher; Luke; Mike "Fresh" McCray; Mr. Mixx; 2 Live Crew; Denver A. Wright

Luke featuring the 2 Live Crew chronology
As Nasty as They Wanna Be (1989)	Banned in the U.S.A.: The Luke LP (1990)	Live in Concert (1990)

Alternative cover

Singles from Banned in the U.S.A.
- 1. "Banned in the U.S.A." Released: May 3, 1990; 2. "Do the Bart" Released: February 6, 1991

Professional ratings
Review scores
Source	Rating
Allmusic	4.5/5 stars

Banned in the U.S.A.: The Luke LP (later reissued as Banned in the U.S.A.) is the fourth studio album by American hip hop group 2 Live Crew, released on July 24, 1990, by Luke and Atlantic Records. Originally credited as Luke's solo album, it included the hits "Do the Bart" and "Banned in the U.S.A.". It was also the very first release to bear the RIAA-standard Parental Advisory warning sticker.

== Music ==
The eponymous title single is a reference to the decision in a court case that 2 Live Crew's previous album As Nasty As They Wanna Be was obscene (the decision would later be overturned on appeal). Bruce Springsteen granted the group permission to interpolate his song "Born in the U.S.A." for it.

Displeased over the decision of Florida Governor Bob Martinez who, on being asked to examine the album, decided it was obscene and recommended local law enforcement take action against it and over the subsequent action of sheriff Nick Navarro of Broward County, Florida, who arrested local record store owners on obscenity charges for selling the group's albums and the subsequent arrest of members of the group on obscenity charges, the group included the song "Fuck Martinez", which also includes multiple repetitions of the phrase "fuck Navarro". The group found two other men with the same names, and had them sign releases, as they thought that this action would make it impossible for Martinez or Navarro to sue them. "Fuck Martinez" is not included on Spotify's stream of Banned in the U.S.A.; however, it is included on Uncle Luke's compilation Booty Calls & Chants.

== Track listing ==
1. "Banned in the U.S.A." – 4:24
2. "News Flash—People in the News" – 0:16
3. "Man, Not a Myth" – 3:57
4. "News Flash—350 Men" – 0:25
5. "Fuck Martinez" – 5:15
6. "News Flash—Super Snoop" – 0:10
7. "Strip Club" – 3:17
8. "News Flash—Nation by Storm" – 0:07
9. "Do the Bart" – 4:28
10. "In Color—Men on Records" – 0:39
11. "Face Down, Ass Up" – 3:02
12. "Hey, Jack!" – 0:55
13. "Bass 9-1-7" – 4:42
14. "So Funky" – 4:58
15. "News Flash—Poll Results" – 0:10
16. "Mamolapenga" – 3:02
17. "Video No Soul" – 0:09
18. "I Ain't Bullshittin' Part 2" – 6:42
19. "Commercial—Nasty Motherfuckers" – 0:15
20. "This Is to Luke from the Posse" – 5:15
21. "News Flash—British Youth" – 0:12
22. "Fuck a Gang" – 3:56
23. "Commercial—Inquiring Minds" – 0:07
24. "Arrest in Effect" – 3:25
25. "Mega Mix IV" – 3:31

There were also VHS tape and LaserDisc releases of the group discussing the ban. The album was briefly parodied on a skit of In Living Color in which Campbell, spoofed by David Alan Grier, is challenged to compose a children's song. Struggling to make a good song, he manages to come up with unoffensive composures until the last line where he must rhyme the word "tucked". The skit is cut off by a narrator saying "The following line is banned in the USA".

== Charts ==
=== Weekly charts ===
Chart (1990)	Peak position
US Billboard 200	21
US Top R&B/Hip-Hop Albums (Billboard)	10

=== Year-end charts ===
Chart (1990)	Position
US Top R&B/Hip-Hop Albums (Billboard)	75
