= In the Nude =

Studio album by Luke
- Released: July 12, 1993
- Studio: Luke Recording Studios (Miami, FL)
- Genre: Dirty rap
- Length: 1:06:23
- Label: Luke
- Producer: Beat Master Clay D.; Bishop "Stick" Burrell; Eddie Miller; Home Team; John "Swift" Catalon; Mike "Fresh" McCray

Luke chronology
I Got Shit on My Mind (1992)	In the Nude (1993)	Freak for Life (1994)

Singles from In the Nude
- 1. "Work It Out" Released: 1993; 2. "Cowards in Compton" Released: June 1993

In the Nude is the third studio album by the American rapper Uncle Luke. It was released on July 12, 1993, via Luke Records. Production was handled by Mike "Fresh" McCray, Home Team, Eddie Miller, Clay Dixon, John "Swift" Catalon and Bishop "Stick" Burrell, with Luke serving as executive producer. It features guest appearances from JT Money, Clayvoisie, Home Team, H-Town, Jiggie Gee and Fresh Kid Ice. The album reached at number 54 on the Billboard 200 and number 8 on the Top R&B/Hip-Hop Albums in the United States.

The album was supported with two singles: "Work It Out" and "Cowards in Compton". Its lead single, "Work It Out", peaked at number 58 on the Hot R&B/Hip-Hop Songs and number 16 on the Hot Rap Songs. The second single off of the album, "Cowards in Compton", made it to number 93 on the Hot R&B/Hip-Hop Songs chart. In the songs "Dre's Momma Needs a Haircut" and "Cowards in Compton" Luke disses Dr. Dre, Snoop Doggy Dogg and Death Row Records, referencing to Dre's World Class Wreckin' Cru times fashion choices.

== Critical reception ==
Professional ratings
Review scores
Source	Rating
AllMusic	2.5/5 stars
RapReviews	5/10
The Virgin Encyclopedia of Eighties Music	2/5 stars

In his mixed review for AllMusic, editor Jason Thurston found that the "album packed with frenetic and danceable hip-hop jams" and added that "Luke betrays a softer side on the funky "Tell Me What You Know", an almost tender tribute to African-American women".

== Track listing ==
No.	Title	Producer(s)	Length
1.	"Do You Hear the Lambs Calling"	Mike "Fresh" McCray	2:10
2.	"Work It Out"		3:07
3.	"We're Fuckin'"		0:42
4.	"Bad Land Boogie" (featuring Home Team)	Home Team	3:54
5.	"I Got a Fuckin' Headache"		0:31
6.	"Tell Me What You Know"	Mike "Fresh" McCray	6:04
7.	"Dre's Momma Needs a Haircut"		1:03
8.	"Cowards in Compton" (featuring JT Money and Clayvoisie)	Mike "Fresh" McCray	3:59
9.	"Head, Head & More Head, Pt. II" (featuring Jiggie Gee and JT Money)	Mike "Fresh" McCray	4:30
10.	"Weenie Roast"		0:39
11.	"Menege a Tois, Pt. II"	John "Swift" Catalon	5:06
12.	"Pimple on My Dick"		0:50
13.	"The Hero"	Eddie Miller	3:19
14.	"Whatever"	Beat Master Clay D.	5:17
15.	"Stop Looking at My Dick"		0:50
16.	"The Hop"	Mike "Fresh" McCray	4:08
17.	"L.L.O.L.M."		1:25
18.	"Freestyle Joint" (featuring JT Money, Clayvoise, Fresh Kid Ice and Home Team)	Mike "Fresh" McCray; Home Team	5:27
19.	"$100 Bet"		1:13
20.	"Bust a Nut" (featuring H-Town)	Bishop "Stick" Burrell	5:12
21.	"Wear a Rubber"		1:11
22.	"Take It Off"	Beat Master Clay D.	4:35
23.	"The Boy Got Some Dick"		0:24
24.	"Headbanger"	Eddie Miller	4:19
25.	"Good to the Last Drop"		0:26
26.	"Shout Outs"	Mike "Fresh" McCray	6:15
Total length:			1:16:23

== Personnel ==
- Luther "Uncle Luke" Campbell – lyrics, vocals, executive producer
- Patrick "Debonaire" Walter – vocals & producer (tracks: 4, 18)
- Van "Drugz" Watler – vocals & producer (tracks: 4, 18)
- Jeffrey "JT Money" Thompkins – vocals (tracks: 8, 9, 18)
- Clayton "Clayvoisé" Roland – vocals (tracks: 8, 18)
- Regenia "Jiggie Gee" Anderson – vocals (track 9)
- Christopher "Fresh Kid Ice" Wong Won – vocals (track 18)
- H-Town – vocals (track 20)
- Gary King – guitar & keyboards (track 11)
- Eddie Miller – drums (track 13), producer (tracks: 13, 24), mixing, engineering
- Michael "Mike Fresh" McCray – producer (tracks: 1, 6, 8, 9, 16, 18, 26)
- John "Swift" Catalon – producer (track 11)
- Clay Dixon – producer (tracks: 14, 22)
- Bishop "Stick" Burrell – producer (track 20)
- Mike Fuller – mastering
- Milton Mizell – graphics

== Charts ==
Chart (1993)	Peak position
US Billboard 200	54
US Top R&B/Hip-Hop Albums (Billboard)	8
