= Professor Griff =

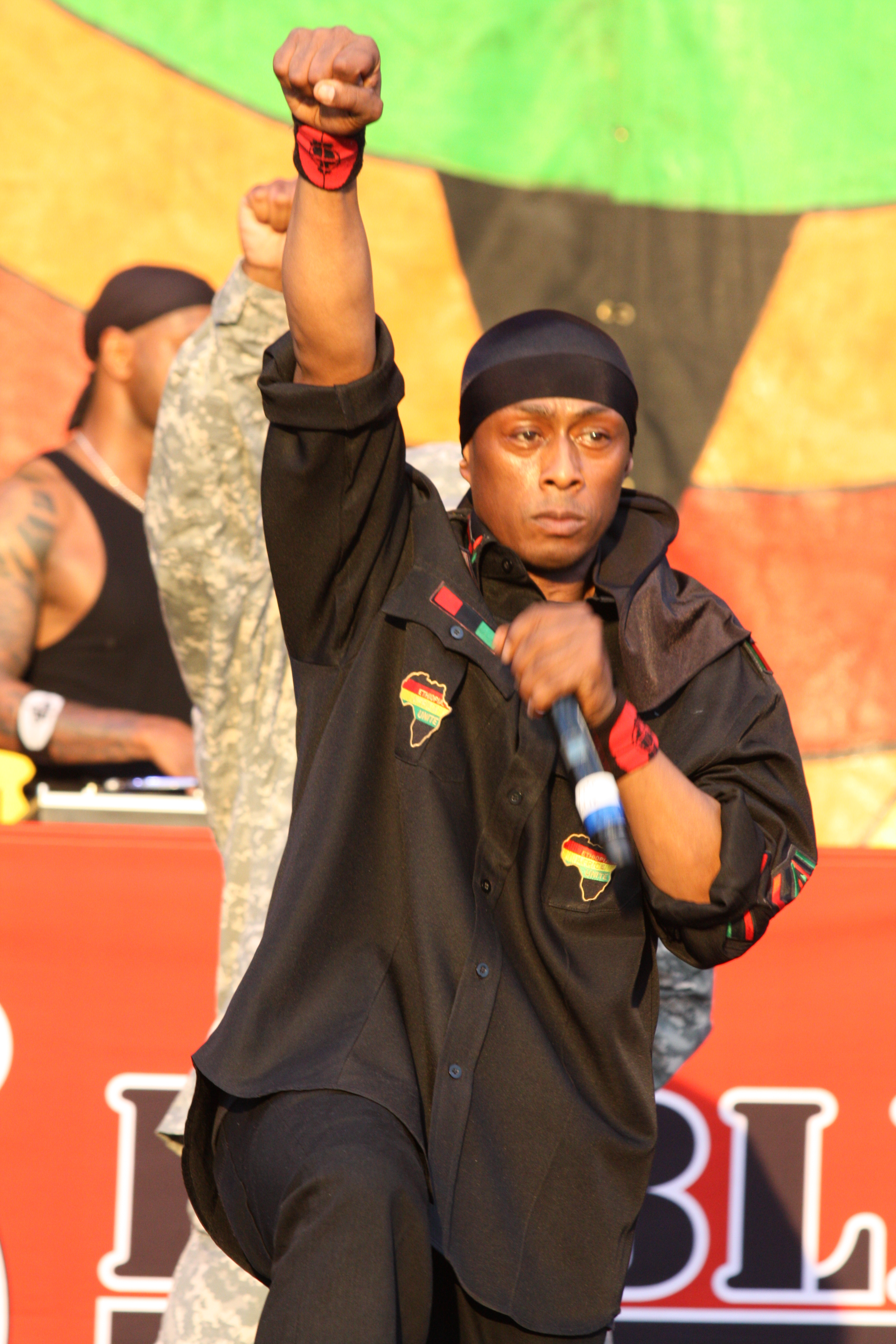
- Professor Griff performing with Public Enemy in 2014

Background information
- Also known as: Kavon Shah
- Born: Richard Duane Griffin; August 1, 1960 (age 66); Roosevelt, New York, U.S.
- Genre: Hip-hop
- Occupations: Rapper; spoken word artist; lecturer
- Instrument: Vocals
- Years active: 1982–present
- Labels: Luke; Atlantic; Blackheart; PolyGram; PIAS
- Formerly of: Public Enemy
- Spouse: Solé (m. 2017; sep. 2026)

Richard Duane Griffin (born August 1, 1960), better known by his stage name Professor Griff, is an American spoken word artist, and lecturer. He was a member of the hip-hop group Public Enemy, serving as the group's "Minister of Information".

== Life and career ==
Griffin grew up in Roosevelt, Long Island, and was a childhood friend of Carlton Ridenhour, who later became known as Chuck D. After serving in the United States Army, Griffin started a private security firm called Unity Force to manage security for local parties and nightlife events. During this time, Chuck D was part of Spectrum City DJs, a mobile DJ group founded by Hank Shocklee in 1975 that also included Keith Shocklee and Eric "Vietnam" Sadler. Unity Force and Spectrum City regularly worked together at the same local events, forming the network of people that later became Public Enemy.

=== 1986–1989: Public Enemy and the S1W ===
In 1986, Def Jam Recordings signed Chuck D to a recording contract. Chuck D then recruited his Spectrum City partners and Griffin to form the group Public Enemy. During his time with Public Enemy, he was an adherent of the ideas espoused by Nation of Islam leader Louis Farrakhan, which informed both Griffin's and Public Enemy's ideological views. Griffin was given the title of "Minister of Information," a role focused on research and group ideology rather than musical performance. He co-wrote a few songs for the group, including "She Watch Channel Zero?!" on the album It Takes a Nation of Millions to Hold Us Back. Griffin also turned his security company, Unity Force, into the Security of the First World (S1W). The S1W acted as a uniformed security team that performed martial arts and military-style drills on stage during live concerts. Griffin left Public Enemy in 1989 following controversial remarks he made during media interviews.

=== 1990–present ===
After leaving Public Enemy, Griffin signed with Luke Records in 1990 to start a solo career. Working with his backing group, The Last Asiatic Disciples, he released three studio albums: Pawns in the Game (1990), Kao's II Wiz*7*Dome (1991), and Disturb N Tha Peace (1992).

Griffin later moved to Atlanta and worked as a licensed bounty hunter. He renewed his working relationship with Chuck D, contributing guest vocals to Chuck D's 1996 solo album Autobiography of Mistachuck. Griffin officially rejoined Public Enemy in 1998, performing on the He Got Game soundtrack and participating in subsequent tours. That same year, he released his fourth solo album, Blood of the Profit, which featured production from Chuck D. In 2001, he released his fifth studio album, And the Word Became Flesh, through Right Stuff Records. Outside of music, Griffin has worked as an author and lecturer.

As a member of Public Enemy, Griffin was inducted into the Rock and Roll Hall of Fame in 2013 and received a Grammy Lifetime Achievement Award in 2020.

== Controversies ==
=== Antisemitism and departure from Public Enemy ===
Before the release of It Takes a Nation of Millions to Hold Us Back, Professor Griff, in his role as Minister of Information, gave interviews to UK magazines on behalf of Public Enemy, during which he made homophobic and antisemitic remarks. In a 1988 issue of Melody Maker he stated, "There's no place for gays. When God destroyed Sodom and Gomorrah, it was for that sort of behaviour" and "If the Palestinians took up arms, went into Israel and killed all the Jews, it'd be all right." However, there was little controversy until May 22, 1989, when Griffin was interviewed by The Washington Times. At the time, Public Enemy enjoyed unprecedented mainstream attention with the single "Fight the Power" from the soundtrack of Spike Lee's film Do the Right Thing.

During the 1989 interview with David Mills, Griffin made numerous statements such as "Jews are responsible for the majority of the wickedness in the world". When the interview was published, a media firestorm emerged, and the band found itself under intense scrutiny.

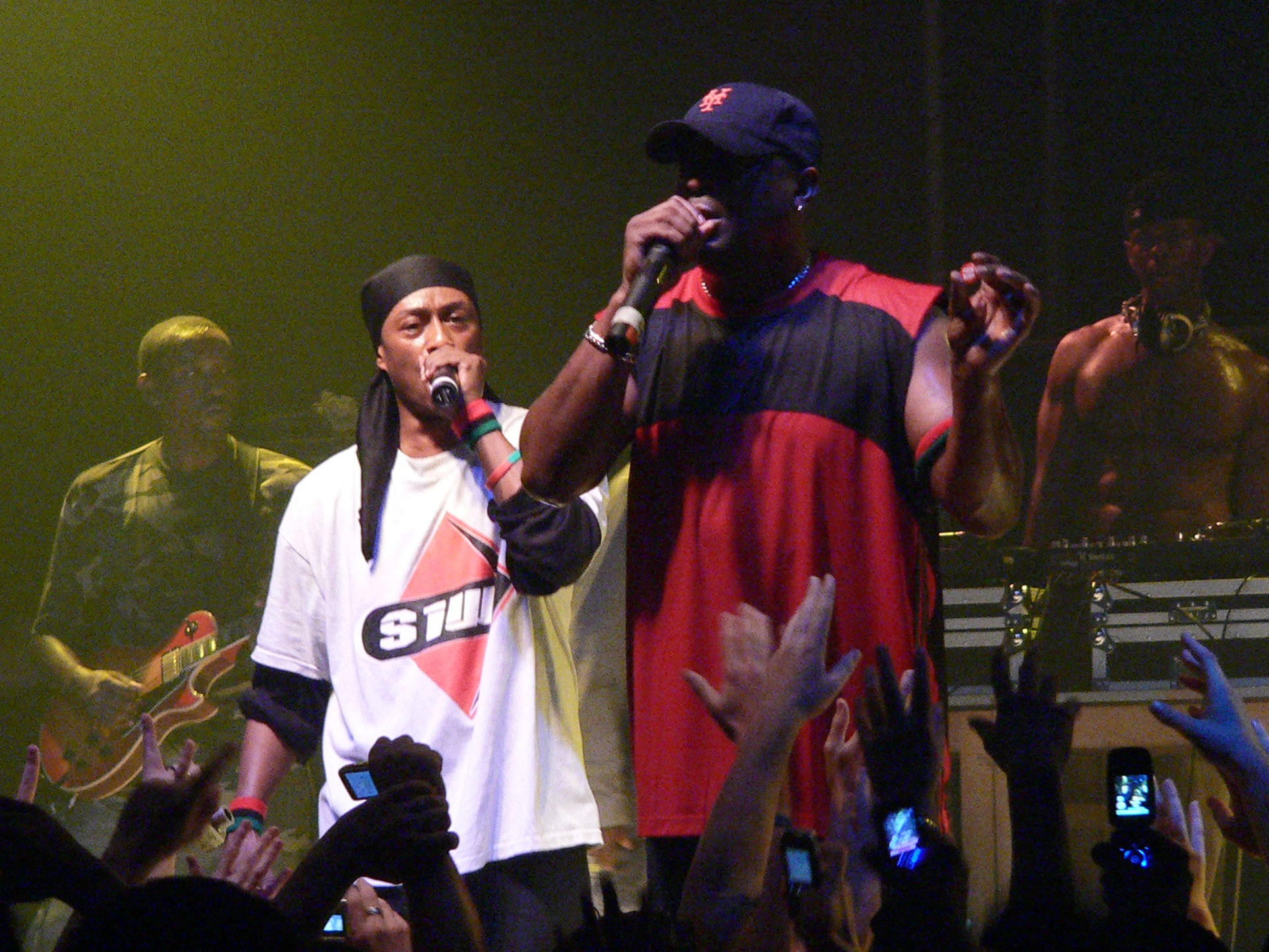
Griff behind Chuck D, in Zagreb in 2006

In a series of press conferences, Griffin was either fired, quit, or demoted. Def Jam co-founder Rick Rubin had already left the label by then; taking his place alongside Russell Simmons was Lyor Cohen, the son of Israeli immigrants who had run Rush Artist Management since 1985. Before the dust settled, Cohen claims to have arranged for a Holocaust museum to give the band a private tour.

In an attempt to defuse the situation, Public Enemy frontman Chuck D first expressed an apology on Griffin's behalf, and fired Griffin soon thereafter. Griffin later rejoined the group, provoking more protests, causing Chuck D to briefly disband the group. When Public Enemy reformed, due to increasing attention from the press and pressure from Def Jam hierarchy, Griffin was no longer with the group.

Griffin later publicly expressed remorse for his statements after a meeting with the National Holocaust Awareness Student Organization in 1990.

In his 2009 book Analytixz, Griffin once again admitted the faults in his 1989 statement: "To say the Jews are responsible for the majority of wickedness that went on around the globe, I would have to know about the majority of wickedness that went on around the globe, which is impossible. ... I'm not the best knower—God is. Then, not only knowing that, I would have to know who is at the crux of all of the problems in the world and then blame Jewish people, which is not correct." Griff also said that not only were his words taken out of context, but that the recording was never released to the public for an unbiased listen. In a YouTube interview on August 2, 2018, Griffin recalled one of his many long conversations with record executive Lyor Cohen he said he used to have respectful debates about history: "I told him about the history of him and his people about the Ashkenazi, the Ashke-Nazis, and when I laid it on him he couldn't handle it and I'm like, all right, which is common knowledge today everybody talking about it, you understand what I'm saying people are making books about it."

In June 2020, Griffin was a guest on the podcast Cannon's Class by rapper and television host Nick Cannon. During the podcast, Cannon and Griffin stated antisemitic conspiracy theories about Jewish control of finance and the Rothschild family and "black people as the 'true Hebrews'".

=== Afrocentrism ===
Griffin embraces a form of Afrocentrism. He is a member of the Nation of Islam.

After his departure from Public Enemy, Griffin formed his own group, the Last Asiatic Disciples. Griffin's albums were of an Islamic (NOI) and Afrocentric style, combined with increasingly spoken word lyrics.

His lyrics and record titles as a solo artist referenced his allegiance to the Nation of Islam. Another general theme in his lyrics is the New World Order conspiracy theory.

== Personal life ==
On August 27, 2017, Griffin married rapper Solé. The couple met 23 years earlier and resumed their relationship after Solé and Ginuwine divorced. In October 2026, Solé announced their separation.

== Discography ==
| Year | Album | Chart Positions | |
| Year | Album | US | US Hip-Hop |
|---|---|---|---|
| 1990 | Pawns in the Game | 127 | 24 |
| 1991 | Kao's II Wiz*7*Dome | — | 70 |
| 1992 | Disturb N Tha Peace | — | — |
| 1998 | Blood of the Profit | — | — |
| 2001 | And The Word Became Flesh | — | — |
— - denotes the album failed to chart or was not released
