= Banned in the U.S.A. (song) =

1990 single by 2 Live Crew

Single by 2 Live Crew

from the album Banned in the U.S.A. and The Luke LP
- Released: May 3, 1990
- Recorded: 1989
- Genre: Political hip hop
- Length: 4:24
- Label: Luke; Atlantic
- Songwriters: Luther Campbell; David Hobbs; Marquis Ross; Christopher Wong Won
- Producers: Mr. Mixx; Luke Records; 2 Live Crew

2 Live Crew singles chronology
"The Fuck Shop" (1989)	"Banned in the U.S.A." (1990)	"Mama Juanita" (1990)

"Banned in the U.S.A." is a song recorded by the American hip hop group 2 Live Crew. It was released on May 3, 1990 by Luke and Atlantic Records, as the lead single from their fourth album of the same name (1990). "Banned in the U.S.A." was also released on the alternate version of the album, credited as Luke's debut solo album, titled The Luke LP. The song peaked at numbers 18 and 20 on the US Cash Box Top 100 and Billboard Hot 100 charts. It is the group's highest-charting song on these charts and it also reached number-one on the Billboard Hot Rap Tracks chart.

== Content ==
The song is a reference to the decision in a court case that the 2 Live Crew's album As Nasty as They Wanna Be was obscene. (The decision would later be overturned on appeal.) It contains a sample of a Ronald Reagan impressionist proclaiming the United States' government to be a government "Of the people, for the people, by the people."

== Charts ==
Weekly chart performance for "Banned in the U.S.A."
Chart (1990)	Peak Position
Netherlands (Dutch Top 40)	32
Netherlands (Single Top 100)	28
US Billboard Hot 100	20
US Hot R&B/Hip-Hop Songs (Billboard)	13
US Cash Box Top 100	18
