= Dance All Night (Jessica Wright song) =

Single by Jess Wright
- Released: 16 September 2012
- Recorded: 2012
- Genre: Dance
- Length: 3:22
- Label: All Around the World
- Songwriter(s): Jessica Wright, Christopher Rudall, Ciaran Bell, Lee Butler, Steven Laycock

Jess Wright singles chronology
| "Dance All Night" (2012) | "Dominoes" (2013) |

"Dance All Night" is the debut single by British singer and reality television star Jess Wright, released in the United Kingdom on All Around the World as a digital download on 16 September 2012. The song entered the UK Singles Chart at number 36.

== Music video ==
A music video to accompany the release of "Dance All Night" was first released onto YouTube on 20 June 2012 at a total length of three minutes and twenty-one seconds.

== Track listing ==
Digital download
| No. | Title | Length |
|---|---|---|
| 1. | "Dance All Night" (Edit) | 3:22 |
| 2. | "Dance All Night" (Extended Mix) | 5:18 |
| 3. | "Dance All Night" (JRMX Edit) | 3:54 |
| 4. | "Dance All Night" (JRMX Club Mix) | 6:37 |
| 5. | "Dance All Night" (Rudedog Remix) | 6:13 |
| 6. | "Dance All Night" (Supasound Dubby Remix) | 5:03 |
| 7. | "Dance All Night" (JRMX Dub Mix) | 6:36 |
| 8. | "Dance All Night" (Video) | 3:20 |

== Chart performance ==
| Chart (2012) | Peak position |
|---|---|
| UK Singles (OCC) | 36 |

== Release history ==
| Region | Date | Format | Label |
|---|---|---|---|
| United Kingdom | 16 September 2012 | Digital download | All Around the World |

== Credits and personnel ==
- Cairon Bell - Composer
- Lee Butler - Composer, Producer, A&R
- Cab @ AllStar - Assistant Engineer
- Steve Cocky - Composer, Producer, Vocal Engineer, A&R
- Christian Davies - Composer, Producer, Instrumentation, Mixing, Mastering
- Martin O'Shea - Executive Producer, Management
- Louise Rogan - Backing Vocals
- Emma Rouse - Management
- Jessica Wright - Composer, Primary Artist
- Recorded at AllStar Studios and Base Studios
