= DJ Uncle Al =

Background information
- Also known as: Uncle Al
- Born: Albert Leroy Moss; August 14, 1969
- Died: September 10, 2001 (aged 32) Miami, Florida, U.S.
- Genres: Southern rap, Miami bass, hip hop
- Occupations: DJ, rapper
- Instrument: Turntables
- Years active: 1990–2001

Albert Leroy Moss (August 14, 1969 – September 10, 2001), better known by the stage name "DJ Uncle Al", was an American DJ from Miami, Florida. He became known for his work as a music producer and broadcaster in the local community. He was shot and killed on September 10, 2001.

== Biography ==
Born Albert Leroy Moss on August 14, 1969, in Miami, Florida, DJ Uncle Al was a pioneering DJ and influential figure in Miami's hip-hop community, becoming known for his energetic style and innovative mixes, which showcased his unique ability to blend various genres, including hip-hop, reggae, and dancehall. DJ Uncle Al developed a passion for music at an early age, graduating from Miami Northwestern High School.

He started his career in the mid-1980s, during a time when Miami bass—a high-energy, bass-heavy style of hip-hop—was gaining popularity, and worked as a broadcaster, hosting radio shows on local stations like WEDR 99 Jamz and Mixx 96. His shows, which often featured live mixing and freestyle sessions, became essential listening for fans of Miami bass and hip-hop. He was known for his catchphrase, "Bass is gonna blow your mind" which encapsulated the essence of his high-energy performances. As a producer, DJ Uncle Al helped to shape the sound of Miami bass, working with numerous artists and releasing several successful tracks that became anthems in the Miami music scene. His influence extended beyond music production as he promoted local talent and provided a platform for rising artists through his radio shows and live events.

DJ Uncle Al was deeply committed to his community and used his influence to promote positive messages and initiatives. He was known for organizing and participating in events that aimed to reduce violence and uplift the youth in Miami. His annual "Peace in the Hood" block parties were particularly popular, bringing residents together for a day of community solidarity, music and fun.

On September 10, 2001, DJ Uncle Al was shot and killed at his Miami home at the age of 32. The DJ Uncle Al "Peace in the Hood" festival is held in the Liberty City area of Miami in honor of him. A suspect was charged with the murder four years later, but the charges were dropped in 2007.
