= Poison Clan =

American hip hop group

- Origin: Miami, Florida, U.S.
- Genres: Hip-hop
- Years active: 1990–1995
- Labels: Effect; Luke; Warlock
- Past members: JT Money; Debonaire; Drugz; Madball; Uzi; Big Ram

Poison Clan was a hip-hop group signed to Effect Records from 1990 to 1992, then later signed to Luke Records from 1993 to 1995. The group had various lineups and members were JT Money, Debonaire, Drugz, Uzi, Madball and Big Ram.

AllMusic noted about the group's 1999 compilation album, "The best tracks from Poison Clan as well as former frontman J.T. Money, this collection includes 'Fakin' Like Gangsta's,' 'Shake Whatcha Mama Gave Ya,' 'Dance All Night,' 'Check Out the Ave. Pt. 1 & 2' and 'Action' (featuring Likkle Wicked)."

== Discography ==
=== Albums ===
==== Studio albums ====
Year	Album	Chart positions		
Year	Album	US	US Hip-Hop	Heatseekers
1990	2 Low Life Muthas	-	42	-
1992	Poisonous Mentality	-	62	20
1993	Ruff Town Behavior	97	12	12
1995	Strait Zooism	-	80	-
"—" denotes the album failed to chart or not released
