= Uncle Luke =

American musician and actor (born 1960)

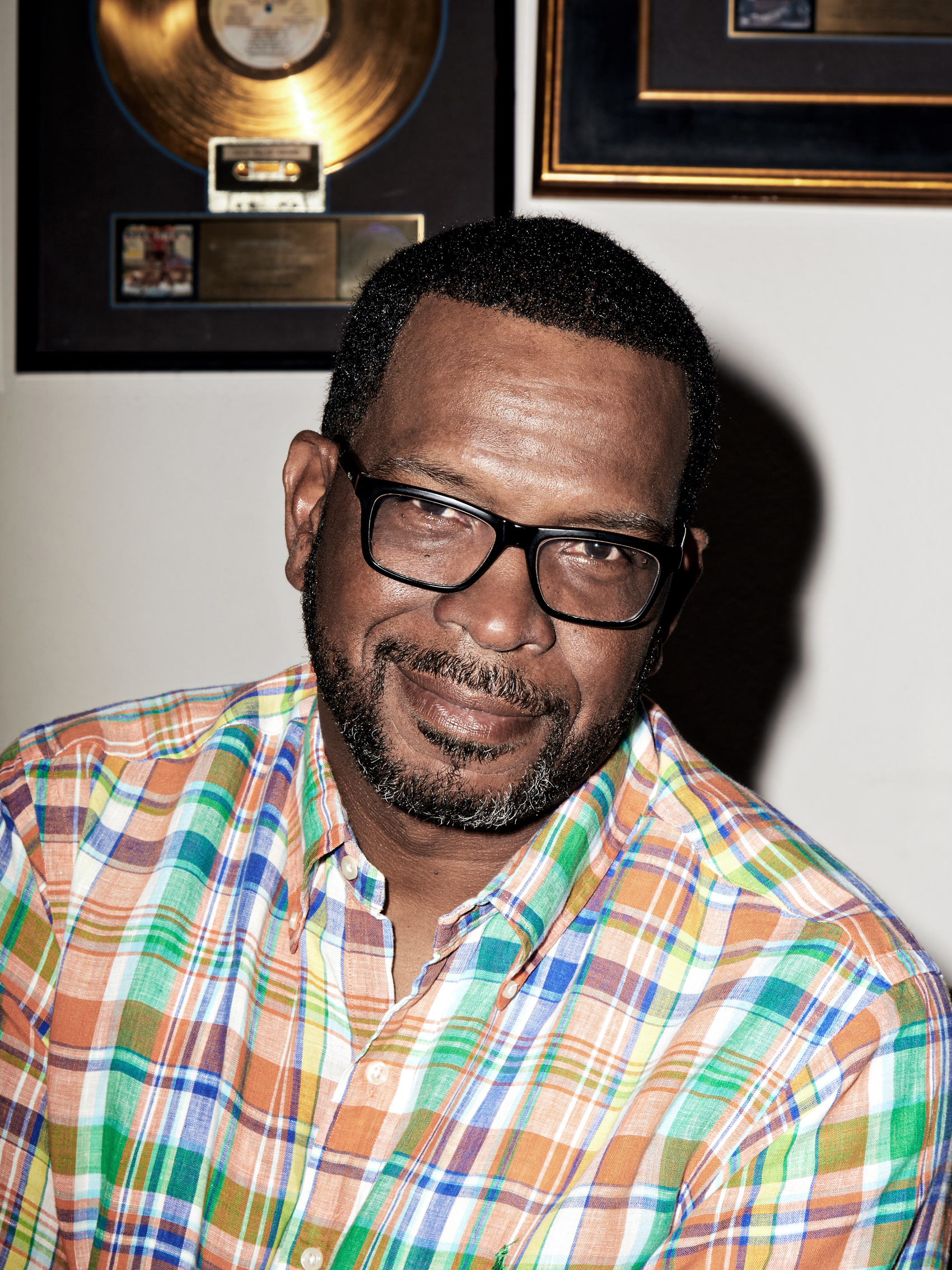
- Luke in May 2017

Background information
- Also known as: Luke Skyywalker; Solo Luke; Uncle Luke; Luke; Captain D
- Born: Luther Roderick Campbell; December 22, 1960 (age 65); Miami, Florida, U.S.
- Genres: Southern hip-hop; Miami bass
- Occupations: Rapper; songwriter; promoter; record executive; actor
- Instrument: Vocals
- Years active: 1981–2010; 2017–present
- Labels: Luke; Atlantic; Island; Koch; Virgin; LaFace; Pandisc
- Formerly of: 2 Live Crew

Luther Roderick Campbell (born December 22, 1960), also known by his stage names Luke or Uncle Luke (originally Luke Skyywalker), is an American rapper, music promoter, record executive, actor, and former leader of the rap group 2 Live Crew. He is a pioneer in Florida hip hop and the creator of the Miami bass genre, known for his sexually crude call and response lyrics. He also starred in a short-lived show on VH1, Luke's Parental Advisory.

A member of the Democratic Party, Campbell was a candidate for Mayor of Miami-Dade County in 2011, and ran for U.S. Congress in Florida's 20th congressional district in the 2026 election, where he was defeated in the primary by Congresswoman Debbie Wasserman Schultz.

== Early life and education ==
Luther Campbell was born on December 22, 1960, in Miami. His mother was a beautician of Bahamian ancestry and his father was a custodian of Jamaican ancestry. He was the youngest of five sons and was named after Martin Luther King Jr. He was raised Catholic.

After graduating from Miami Beach Senior High School in 1979, Campbell was asked by his mother to leave the house every weekday from 8:30am to 4:30pm regardless of his employment status.

== Career ==
=== 1980s ===
In the early 1980s, Campbell worked as a cook at Mount Sinai Hospital in Miami Beach and as a concert promoter in Miami, bringing rap groups of that era to Miami. In 1983, he also enrolled in an eight-week study course at Miami public radio station WDNA, where he learned basic audio editing and production techniques.

In 1984, Campbell took notice of a single from California named "Revelation" by 2 Live Crew, which consisted of two rappers (Fresh Kid Ice and Amazing V) and a DJ (Mr. Mixx). The single was a hit on the South Florida club circuit, and Campbell decided to bring them from California to Miami for a performance. He took a special interest in the group and began managing them.

2 Live Crew eventually fully relocated to Florida without Amazing Vee and in 1986, 2 Live Crew recorded "Throw the D" with "Ghetto Bass" on the B-side, they went into a joint venture with Campbell to start Luke Skyywalker Records, which was also his first MC name.

In April of that year, Brother Marquis joined the group in Miami. Campbell gave The 2 Live Crew a record deal and officially joined the group. They exploded on the local scene with their gold-selling debut album, The 2 Live Crew Is What We Are (1986). This made Luke Skyywalker and his bandmates rap superstars in south Florida. On April 20, 1987, a clerk at Starship Records in Callaway, Florida was arrested and charged with a felony for selling a copy of The 2 Live Crew Is What We Are to a 14-year-old girl. The charges were dropped before trial.

In 1988, the group released their second album, Move Somethin'. It was certified Gold and featured the singles "Move Somethin'" and "Do Wah Diddy Diddy". The album improved on the charts from the previous album, making it to No. 68 on the Billboard 200 and No. 20 on the Top R&B/Hip Hop Albums chart.

Campbell decided to sell a separate clean version in addition to the explicit version of the album. A record store clerk in Alexander City, Alabama, was cited for selling a copy to an undercover police officer in 1988. It was the first time in the United States that a store owner was held liable for obscenity over music. The charges were dropped after a jury found the owner not guilty.

Their third album As Nasty as They Wanna Be (1989) became the group's largest seller, being certified platinum by the Recording Industry Association of America. In 1990, the United States District Court for the Southern District of Florida ruled that the album was legally obscene; this ruling was later overturned by the Eleventh Circuit. This 11th Circuit decision was then appealed to the United States Supreme Court, which refused to hear the case. It is the first album in history to be deemed legally obscene. An obscenity trial followed, in which Henry Louis Gates, Jr., addressed the court on behalf of the defendants, all of whom were eventually acquitted.

==== University of Miami "pay-for-play" allegations ====
Campbell was also infamous in the late 1980s and early 1990s for his association with the University of Miami football team. Campbell was alleged to have been behind what was referred to as a "pay-for-play" system, which involved cash rewards for acts such as scoring touchdowns and big hits, although Campbell has never actually donated to the University of Miami or its athletics department.

In 1993, Campbell threatened to go public with various alleged violations by the university's athletic department and its football program if Ryan Collins, a black player on the team, was not named starting quarterback that season.

=== 1990s ===
1990 saw the release of Banned in the U.S.A., originally credited as Campbell's solo album featuring 2 Live Crew and in later editions credited as a 2 Live Crew album. The album included the hits "Do the Bart" and the title track. It was also the very first release to bear the RIAA-standard Parental Advisory warning sticker. It peaked at number 20 on the Hot 100.

The eponymous title single is a reference to the decision in a court case that the group's album As Nasty as They Wanna Be was obscene. Bruce Springsteen granted the group permission to interpolate his song "Born in the U.S.A." for it.

Displeased over the decision of Florida Governor Bob Martinez who, on being asked to examine the album, decided it was obscene and recommended local law enforcement take action against it and over the subsequent action of Broward County, Florida, sheriff Nick Navarro, who arrested local record-store owners on obscenity charges for selling the group's albums and the subsequent arrest of members of the group on obscenity charges, the group included the song "Fuck Martinez", which also includes multiple repetitions of the phrase "fuck Navarro". The group found two other men with the same names, and had them sign releases, as they thought that this action would make it impossible for Martinez or Navarro to sue them.

That same year they released Live in Concert, the group's first and only live album, and their fifth record overall. It was released under the Effect subsidiary label of Luke Records, a move that was deemed necessary for the company to be able to release additional 2 Live Crew material outside of their distribution deal with Atlantic Records. The album peaked at number 46 on the Top R&B/Hip-Hop Albums.

Sports Weekend: As Nasty as They Wanna Be, Pt. 2 (1991) is the sixth album overall and fifth studio album by the 2 Live Crew. A clean version was released later that same year titled Sports Weekend: As Clean as They Wanna Be Part II and was the sequel of As Clean as They Wanna Be. This would be the last studio album by all original members of the 2 Live Crew.

In 1992, I Got Shit on My Mind was released. It was his first official solo album without The 2 Live Crew. It peaked at No. 52 on the Billboard 200 chart and No. 20 on the Top R&B/Hip-Hop Albums chart. It was the album that spawned the hit single "I Wanna Rock" (better known more prominently as "Doo-Doo Brown"), which became Campbell's signature song. Upon its initial release in 1992, the song did not garner much attention until the following year, when it became a runaway hit, and charted at 73 on the Hot 100.

June 8, 1993 saw the release of his third solo album In the Nude. It was another success, reaching No. 54 on the Billboard 200 and No. 8 on the Top R&B/Hip-Hop Albums.

One of The 2 Live Crew’s songs, which used a parody of Roy Orbison's "Oh, Pretty Woman", was the subject of a 1993-1994 lawsuit, Campbell v. Acuff-Rose Music, Inc., which was argued in front of the U.S. Supreme Court. The Miami New Times described Campbell as "the man whose booty-shaking madness once made the U.S. Supreme Court stand up for free speech".

In 1994, he reunited with Fresh Kid Ice, and a local rapper named Verb made an album under the banner The New 2 Live Crew. It is the last 2 Live Crew related project to feature him. The album became a moderate hit, peaking at No. 52 on the Billboard 200 and No. 9 on the Top R&B/Hip-Hop Albums, as well as producing two charting singles, "Hell, Yeah" and "You Go Girl" who were both made into music videos.

Freak for Life is Campbell's fourth album. It was released on July 12, 1994, through Luke Records. Freak for Life peaked at No. 174 on the Billboard 200 and No. 24 on the Top R&B/Hip-Hop Albums, making it his lowest charting album at the time. One single found mild success, "It's Your Birthday" peaked at No. 33 on the Hot Rap Singles and No. 91 on the Hot R&B/Hip-Hop Singles & Tracks.

Also in 1994, Campbell co-founded Liberty City Optimists, an inner city youth sports program. One of his notable apprentices is Devonta Freeman, who went on to play college football for Florida State Seminoles, rival of the Hurricanes.

Campbell and his label, Luke Records, Inc. went bankrupt in 1995 and sold their catalogs to Joseph Weinberger and Lil' Joe Records, Inc. in 1996.

Uncle Luke was released on May 14, 1996, on Luther Campbell Music and was mainly produced by Darren "DJ Spin" Rudnick, and Rod XL, with additional production by Frankie Cutlass, Ice Cube and Doug E. Fresh. Uncle Luke was a success, peaking at No. 51 on the Billboard 200 and No. 8 on the Top R&B/Hip-Hop Albums and spawned a single, "Scarred", which made it to No. 64 on the Billboard Hot 100 and No. 7 on the Hot Rap Singles, the song was also turned into a Video.

Changin' the Game is the sixth album released by Campbell. It was released on November 11, 1997, on the Island Black Music label in collaboration with Luke Records and featured production from Campbell, Rod XL, Lil' Jon and Louis "Ugly" Howard. Though the album was met with some positive reviews, the album was a flop and remains Campbell's lowest charting album, only making it to No. 49 on the Top R&B/Hip-Hop Albums. However, the single "Raise the Roof" found great success peaking at No. 26 on the Billboard Hot 100 and No. 1 on the Hot Rap Singles. The song helped to popularize the arm gesture by the same name which involved repeatedly extending ones arms upwards with the palms of the hands also facing upwards. The song is also featured in the compilation album Jock Jams Volume 4.

In 1998 he played a supporting role in the movie Ride a comedy film written and directed by Millicent Shelton. It stars Malik Yoba, Fredro Starr, and Melissa De Sousa. Also that year he made a special cameo appearance in Ice Cube's The Players Club. The comedy/drama film stars Bernie Mac, Monica Calhoun, Jamie Foxx, John Amos, A. J. Johnson, Alex Thomas, Charlie Murphy, Terrence Howard, Faizon Love and LisaRaye.

=== 2000s ===
Somethin' Nasty is the seventh album released by Campbell. It was released on March 13, 2001, on Luke Records through Koch Records' short-lived independent label distribution unit, KELA (Koch Entertainment Label Alliance) and featured production by Campbell's former 2 Live Crew bandmate, Mr. Mixx, Daz Dillinger, Gorilla Tek, and Campbell himself. The album found minor success, peaking at No. 149 on the Billboard 200, No. 36 on the Top R&B/Hip-Hop Albums and No. 6 on the Top Independent Albums.

Campbell's last release, My Life & Freaky Times, was released in March 2006, and peaked at 32 at the Top R&B/Hip-Hop Albums. The first singles serviced to radio were "Holla at Cha Homeboy", featuring Pitbull & Petey Pablo, and the reggaeton-leaning "Pop That" by Plan B and Rey Chester Secretweapon.

That same year, Campbell appeared in Grand Theft Auto: Vice City Stories as DJ Luke for the hip-hop station Fresh 105 FM. Campbell hosts a sports talk show on Miami's 790 The Ticket with former football player Terry Kirby on Saturdays.

Campbell has previously entered the adult film industry and cites on his MySpace page the need to clean up the "sometimes amateurish new courtship of Hip-Hop and Adult Entertainment". He produced the adult entertainment movie Luke's Bachelor Party in 2007.

In December 2007, Campbell launched The Luke Entertainment Group and took the company public trading under the symbol LKEN on Pink Sheets.

In 2008, he starred in his own short-lived show on VH1, Luke's Parental Advisory.

Campbell was interviewed about his involvement with the University of Miami football program for the documentary The U, which premiered December 12, 2009, as part of ESPN's 30 for 30 series.

=== 2010s ===
In 2010, he briefly reunited with Fresh Kid Ice, Brother Marquis, and Mr. Mixx as the 2 Live Crew were honorees winners at the 2010 VH1 Hip-Hop Honors: The Dirty South Edition. On February 2, 2011, Campbell announced his intention to run for mayor of Miami-Dade County on a platform that includes making housing projects safer, transparency in local government, and taxing strippers. He came in fourth in a field of 11 candidates, winning 11% of the vote. By Thanksgiving 2014, Campbell reunited with 2 Live Crew (Fresh Kid Ice and Brother Marquis) for a series of shows until 2015.

Campbell served as the head coach of the Miami Edison Senior High School football team from 2018 to 2026.

=== Political career ===
In 2026, Campbell resigned his high school coaching role and announced his intention to run in the 2026 election for Florida's 20th congressional district.

== Personal life ==
On February 18, 2009, Campbell was arrested for falling behind on child support payments. He allegedly has six or seven children, each from a different mother.

In February 2010, Campbell became a columnist for Miami New Times, an alternative weekly newspaper distributed in the Miami metropolitan area. Campbell's column, called "Luke's Gospel", provides "a forum for his crazy-ass views on current events," which include politics, sports and entertainment. He is quoted on the Miami New Times website as saying, "It's the perfect place for me. I am a free-speech guy. It's just a match made in Heaven. Can you believe it? Me turned loose on the world in New Times. Wow."

He supported Kamala Harris' 2024 presidential campaign, stating: "I’m getting sick and tired of you m…f……. who’s out here trying to take the blackness away from Kamala Harris, our VP and soon-to-be president because your daddy, Donald Trump, gives you these talking messages, so you repeat the dumb shit."

== Discography ==
=== Studio albums ===
Year	Album	Chart Positions		
Year	Album	US	US Hip-Hop	
1990	The Luke LP	21	10	
1992	I Got Shit on My Mind	52	20	
1993	In the Nude	54	8	
1994	Freak for Life	174	24	
1996	Uncle Luke	51	8	
1997	Changin' the Game	–	49	
2001	Somethin' Nasty	149	36	
2006	My Life & Freaky Times	–	35	"—" denotes the album failed to chart or not released

=== Compilation albums ===
- 1996: Greatest Hits
- 2000: Luke's Freak Fest 2000
- 2002: Scandalous: The All Star Compilation

=== Singles ===
List of singles, with selected chart positions and certifications, showing year released and album name
Title	Year	Peak chart positions			Album
Title	Year	US	US R&B	US Rap	Album
"Banned in the U.S.A." (featuring 2 Live Crew)	1990	20	13	1	The Luke LP
"I Wanna Rock"	1992	73	39	8	I Got Shit on My Mind
"It's Your Birthday"	1994	—	91	33	Freak for Life
"Scarred" (featuring Trick Daddy and Verb)	1996	64	31	7	Uncle Luke
"Raise the Roof" (featuring No Good but So Good)	1998	26	20	1	Changin' the Game
"—" denotes a recording that did not chart or was not released in that territory.
