= Luke Records =

American record label

- Founded: 1985; 41 years ago (as Luke Skyywalker Records)
- Founder: Luther Campbell; David Chackler
- Distributor: Atlantic Records
- Genre: Hip hop music
- Country of origin: United States
- Location: Miami, Florida
- Official website: lukerecord.com

Luke Records is an American record label formed in 1985 by Luther Campbell, the former producer and hypeman of 2 Live Crew, and David Chackler, and based in Miami, Florida. It was one of the first recording labels devoted almost exclusively to Southern hip-hop.

The label was originally called Luke Skyywalker Records; however, because it was not found to be of fair use, Campbell shortened his pseudonym to Luke in 1990 (a result of George Lucas' successful lawsuit over Campbell appropriating the Skywalker name).

From 1990 to 1993, the label was distributed by Atlantic Records. The label's catalogue has been reclaimed by Luther Campbell and the estates of Fresh Kid Ice & Brother Marquis.

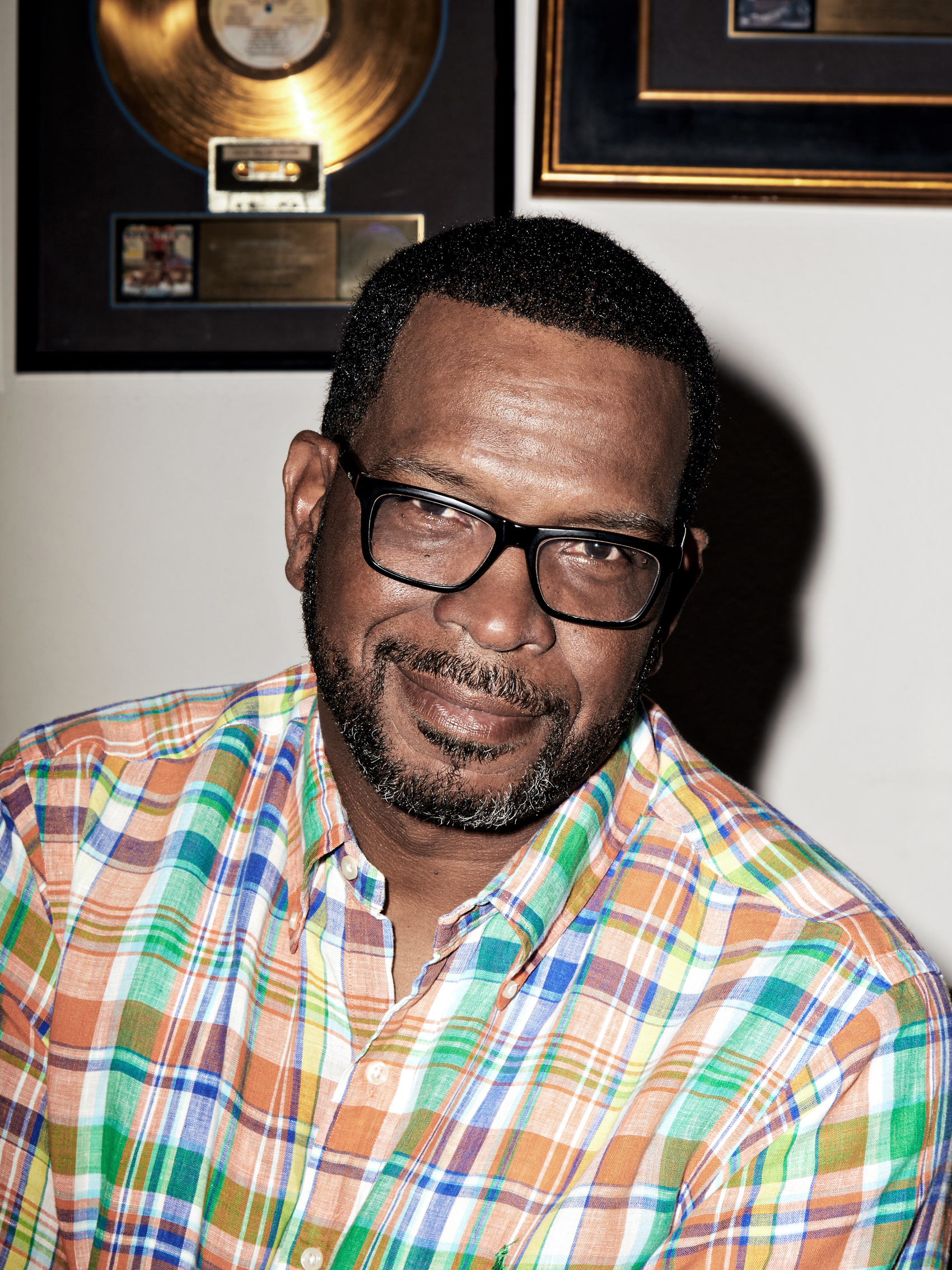
Luther Campbell, co-founder of Luke Records
