= Production of Ben-Hur (1959 film) =

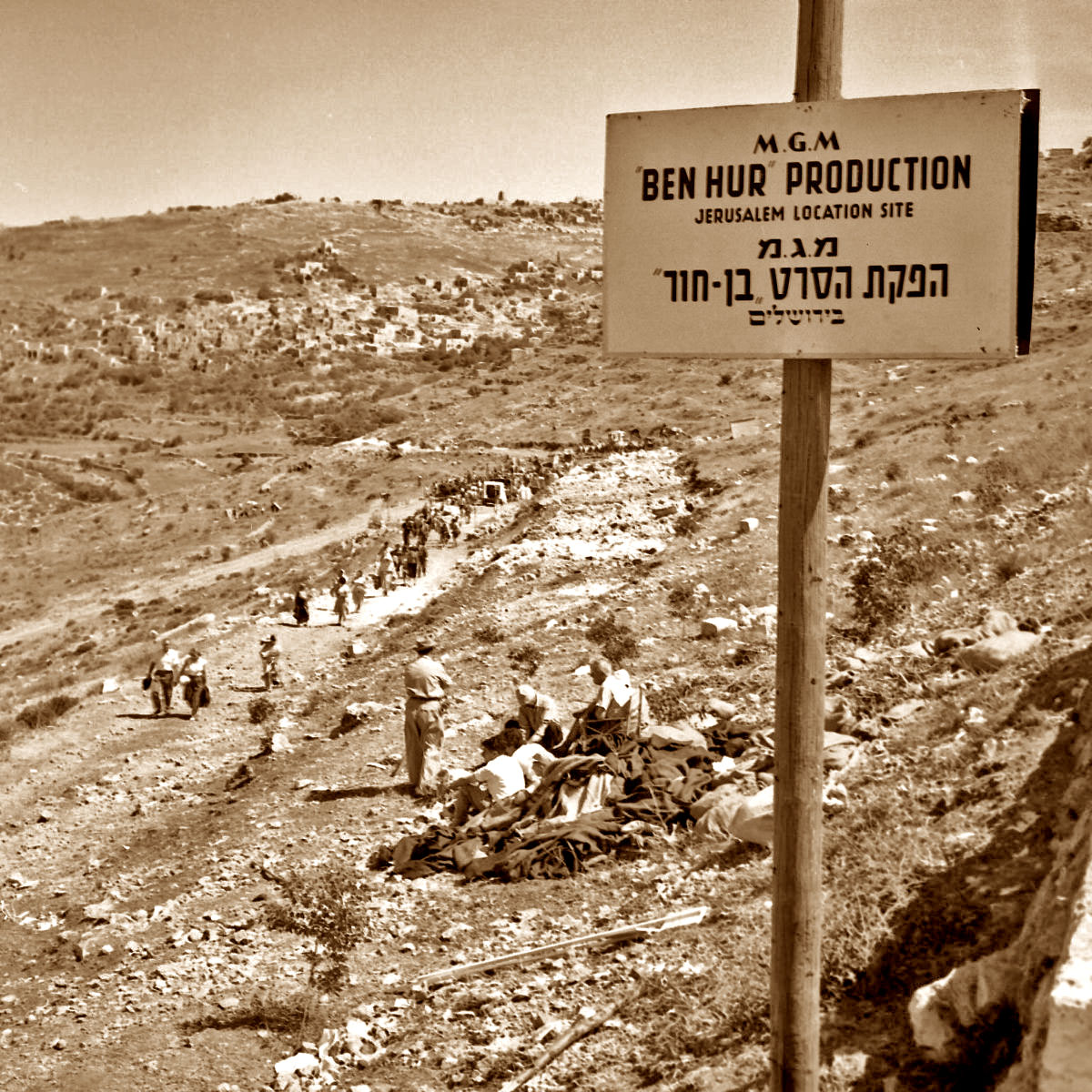
Ben-Hur filming site near Lifta, intended to be Jerusalem

Metro-Goldwyn-Mayer (MGM) originally announced a remake of the 1925 silent film Ben-Hur in December 1952, ostensibly as a way to spend its Italian assets. (Note: MGM had extensive amounts of income in Italian lira. In the wake of World War II the Italian government banned the movement of lira out of Italy as a means of stabilizing the inflation-plagued Italian economy. Finding a way to spend this money in Italy would free up resources elsewhere for the studio.) Stewart Granger and Robert Taylor were reported to be in the running for the lead. Nine months later, MGM announced it would make the film in CinemaScope, with shooting beginning in 1954. In November 1953, MGM announced it had assigned producer Sam Zimbalist to the picture and hired screenwriter Karl Tunberg to write it. Zimbalist was chosen because he had produced MGM's Best Picture-nominated Christians-and-lions epic Quo Vadis in 1951. The studio then announced in July 1954 that production would start in March 1955 with 42 speaking parts and 97 sets. MGM said Sidney Franklin would direct, that the script by Tunberg was finished, that shooting would occur in Rome and in Spain, and that Marlon Brando was up for the lead. In September 1955, Zimbalist, who continued to claim that Tunberg's script was complete, announced that a $7 million, six-to-seven month production would begin in April 1956 in either Israel or Egypt in MGM's new 65mm widescreen process. MGM, however, suspended production in early 1956.

By the late 1950s, court decisions forcing film studios to divest themselves of theater chains and the competitive pressure of television had caused significant financial distress at MGM. In a gamble to save the studio, and inspired by the success of Paramount Pictures' 1956 Biblical epic The Ten Commandments, studio head Joseph Vogel announced in 1957 that MGM would again move forward on a remake of Ben-Hur. Filming started in May 1958 and wrapped in January 1959, and post-production took six months. Although the budget for Ben-Hur was initially $7 million, it was reported to be $10 million by February 1958, reaching $15 million by the time shooting began—making it the costliest film ever produced up to that time. When adjusted for inflation, the budget of Ben Hur was approximately $166 million in constant dollars.

One notable change in the film involved the opening titles. Concerned that a roaring Leo the Lion (the MGM mascot) would create the wrong mood for the sensitive and sacred nativity scene, Wyler received permission to replace the traditional logo with one in which Leo the Lion is quiet. It was the first time in MGM history that the lion logo was not seen roaring.

== Pre-production ==
=== Development ===
Lew Wallace's 1880 novel Ben-Hur: A Tale of the Christ ran to about 550 pages. Sam Zimbalist hired a number of screenwriters to cut the story down and turn the novel into a script. According to Gore Vidal, more than 12 versions of the script had been written by various writers by the spring of 1958. Vidal himself had been asked to write a version of the script in 1957, refused, and been placed on suspension for his decision. Karl Tunberg was one of the last writers to work on the script. Zimbalist had initially chosen director Sidney Franklin to helm the picture, and Tunberg consulted with Franklin about the script. Tunberg cut out everything in the book after the crucifixion of Jesus, omitted the sub-plot in which Ben-Hur fakes his death and raises a Jewish army to overthrow the Romans, and altered the manner in which the leperous women are healed. (Note: Instead of being healed as Christ carries His cross, the women are healed after accidentally soaking in rainwater stained by the blood of Jesus after the crucifixion.) The silent film version had introduced Esther early in the picture, rather than midway as in the novel, and Tunberg retained this feature in his script as well. But Zimbalist was unhappy with Tunberg's script, and felt it was "pedestrian" and "unshootable".

The writing effort changed direction when Franklin fell ill and was removed from the production. Zimbalist offered the project to William Wyler, who had been one of 30 assistant directors on the 1925 film, in early 1957. Wyler initially rejected it, considering the quality of the script to be "very primitive, elementary" and no better than hack work. It lacked good characterization, the dramatic structure was poor, and the leads were uninteresting (just "villains and heroes"). Zimbalist showed Wyler some preliminary storyboards for the chariot race, and Wyler began to express an interest in the picture. Zimbalist told Wyler, "Forget the chariot race. That's just second-unit stuff", stating that the real challenge would be to give the picture "body, depth, intimacy", which Wyler was renowned for. Zimbalist also told Wyler that Metro-Goldwyn-Mayer (MGM) would spend up to $10 million on the film, and Wyler, impressed with the large budget, agreed to review the script a second time. The more Wyler thought about the story, the more he became intrigued with its possibilities. However, according to a report in The New York Times, Wyler refused to take the job until he was sure he had a good leading man. MGM permitted Wyler to start casting, and in April 1957, mainstream media outlets reported that Wyler was giving screen tests to Italian leading men, such as Cesare Danova.

By June 13, 1957, MGM was still declining to confirm that Wyler had been hired to direct. Yet, production was due to start, the studio said, in March 1958. In fact, despite conducting screen tests and engaging in other pre-production work for Ben-Hur, Wyler did not agree to direct the film until September 1957, and MGM did not announce his hiring until January 3, 1958. Even though he still lacked a leading man, Wyler took the assignment for many reasons: He was promised a base salary of $350,000 as well as 8 percent of the gross box office (or 3 percent of the net profits, whichever was greater), and he wanted to work in Rome again (where he had filmed Roman Holiday). His base salary was, at the time, the largest ever paid to a director for a single film. Professional competitive reasons also played a role in his decision to direct, and Wyler later admitted that he wished to "out DeMille" and make a "thinking man's" Biblical epic. In later years, William Wyler would joke that it took a Jew to make a good film about Christ.

=== Writing ===
Wyler, like Zimbalist, was also unhappy with the script. He felt Tunberg's draft was too much of a morality play overlaid with current Western political overtones, and that the dialogue was too modern-sounding. Zimbalist brought in playwright S. N. Behrman (who also wrote the script for Quo Vadis) and then playwright Maxwell Anderson to write drafts. Behrman spent about a month working on the script, but how much he contributed to the final version is unclear. Both a contemporary account in the British magazine Films and Filmmaking as well as Vidal biographer Fred Kaplan claim that Anderson was ill and unable to work on the script. The New York Times however, reported in June 1957 that Anderson was at work on the script. (Note: The newspaper would later informally retract this statement, and admit in 1959 that Anderson had been too ill to do any writing.) Vidal said that, by spring 1958, the script largely reflected Anderson and Behrman's work and nearly all the dialogue was in Anderson's "elevated poetic style." Kaplan describes the script at this point as having only a "modest to minimal" understanding of what the ancient Roman world was like, dialogue which veered "between flat Americanisms and stilted formality", and an ill-defined relationship between Judah Ben-Hur and Messala.

Vidal biographer Fred Kaplan states that British poet and playwright Christopher Fry was hired simultaneously with Vidal, although most sources (including Vidal himself) state that Vidal followed Anderson, and that Fry did not come aboard until Vidal was close to leaving the picture. Vidal said that pre-production on the film was already underway in Italy when he flew to Rome in early March 1958 to meet with Wyler. (Note: Vidal says he worked on the script for three months. Fry did not arrive in Rome until May 1958 and Vidal says he did not leave Rome until mid or late June, so Vidal's arrival in Rome can be deduced with some accuracy. See: Vidal, p. 73; Herman, p. 400–401.) Vidal claimed that Wyler had not read the script, and that when he did so (at Vidal's urging) on his flight from the U.S. to Italy, he was upset with the modernist dialogue. Vidal agreed to work on the script for three months so that he would come off suspension and fulfill his contract with MGM, although Zimbalist pushed him to stay throughout the entire production. Vidal was researching a book on the 4th century Roman emperor Julian, and knew a great deal about ancient Rome. Wyler, however, knew almost nothing about the period, and spent most of March having nearly every Hollywood film about ancient Rome flown to him in Italy—where he spent hours screening them.

Vidal's working style was to finish a scene and review it with Zimbalist. Once Vidal and Zimbalist had come to agreement, the scene would be passed to Wyler. Vidal said he kept the structure of the Tunberg/Behrman/Anderson script, but rewrote nearly all the dialogue. Vidal admitted to William Morris in March 1959 that Fry rewrote as much as a third of the dialogue which Vidal had added to the first half of the script. Vidal made one structural change that was not revised, however. The Tunberg script had Ben-Hur and Messala reuniting and falling out in a single scene. Vidal broke the scene in two, so that the men first reunite at the Castle Antonia and then later argue and end their friendship at Ben-Hur's home. Vidal also added small character touches to the script, such as Ben-Hur's purchase of a brooch for Tirzah and a horse for Messala. Vidal claimed that he worked on the first half of the script (everything up to the chariot race), and scripted 10 versions of the scene where Ben-Hur confronts Messala and begs for his family's freedom.

Vidal's claim about a homoerotic subtext is hotly debated. Vidal first made the claim in an interview in the 1995 documentary film The Celluloid Closet, and asserted that he persuaded Wyler to direct Stephen Boyd to play the role as if he were a spurned homosexual lover. Vidal said that he believed that Messala's vindictiveness could only be motivated by the feeling of rejection that a lover would feel, and suggested to Wyler that Stephen Boyd should play the role that way, and that Heston be kept in the dark about the Messala character's motivations. Vidal further claimed that Wyler took his advice. Whether Vidal wrote the scene in question or had the acting conversation with Wyler, and whether Wyler shot what Vidal wrote, remain issues of debate. In 1980, Wallace biographers Robert and Katharine Morsberger said that Vidal's contribution to the script remained unclear. Heston has asserted that Wyler felt Vidal did not solve the problem of motivation, and that Wyler shot little of what he wrote or made little contribution to the script. Wyler himself says that he does not remember any conversation about this part of the script or Boyd's acting with Gore Vidal, and that he discarded Vidal's draft in favor of Fry's. Film critic Gary Giddins also dismisses Vidal's claims, concluding that 80 percent of the script had been written "years before" Vidal came aboard the production. However, Jan Herman, one of Wyler's biographers, asserts "there is no reason to doubt" Vidal's claim, and that Wyler's inability to remember the conversation was just part of the director's notorious caginess. There appears to be some contemporary support for Vidal's assertions. Morgan Hudgens, publicity director for the film, wrote to Vidal in late May 1958 about the crucial scene, and implied there was a homosexual context: "... the big cornpone [the crew's nickname for Heston] really threw himself into your 'first meeting' scene yesterday. You should have seen those boys embrace!" Film critic F. X. Feeney, in a comparison of script drafts, concludes that Vidal made significant and extensive contributions to the script.

The final writer on the film was Christopher Fry. Charlton Heston has claimed that Fry was Wyler's first choice as screenwriter, but that Zimbalist forced him to use Vidal. Whether Fry worked on the script before Vidal or not, sources agree that Fry arrived in Rome in early May 1958 and spent six days a week on the set, writing and rewriting lines of dialogue as well as entire scenes, until the picture was finished. In particular, Fry gave the dialogue a slightly more formal and archaic tone without making it sound stilted and medieval. For example, the sentence "How was your dinner?" became "Was the food not to your liking?" By early June, Fry (working backward from the ending) had finished the screenplay. Film historian Daniel Eagan, however, claims that Fry did not finish the screenplay. Rather, as time went on, Wyler stopped seeking improvements to the script in order to finish the picture.

The final script ran 230 pages. The screenplay differed more from the original novel than did the 1925 silent film version. Some changes made the film's storyline more dramatic. Others inserted an admiration for Jewish people (who had founded the state of Israel by this time) and the more pluralistic society of 1950s America rather than the "Christian superiority" view of Wallace's novel.

==== Credits dispute ====
Wyler said that he tried to get Tunberg and Fry co-credit for writing the screenplay. Tunberg initially agreed, Wyler said, but then changed his mind when the Screen Writers' Guild routinely investigated the claim. According to Gore Vidal and film historian Gary Giddins, however, Wyler tried to get Fry an unshared credit for the screenplay.

The dispute over who would receive screen credit quickly became a public one. According to The New York Times, Vidal challenged the initial determination by the Screen Writers' Guild regarding who would receive writing credit for the film. The Screen Writers' Guild arbitrated the credit under its screenwriting credit system, and unanimously awarded full and sole credit for the script to Tunberg (who, coincidentally, was a former president of the Guild). Both director William Wyler and Sol C. Siegel, head of production at MGM, appealed the Guild's ruling. Tunberg agreed to share credit, but the Guild refused to change its ruling. Wyler publicly campaigned to get Fry screenwriting credit, feeling that insider politics had led the Guild to give Tunberg sole credit. In retaliation, the Guild took out advertisements in trade newspapers accusing Wyler of trying to undermine the integrity of the credit and arbitration system. When Ben-Hur won Academy Awards in a wide range of categories except best screenplay, the Guild then accused Wyler of interfering with Tunberg's nomination. Later, when Charlton Heston accepted his Oscar for Best Leading Actor, he thanked Christopher Fry in his acceptance speech. The Guild sent him a letter which accused Heston of deliberately impugning the Guild and Tunberg's reputation.

=== Casting ===
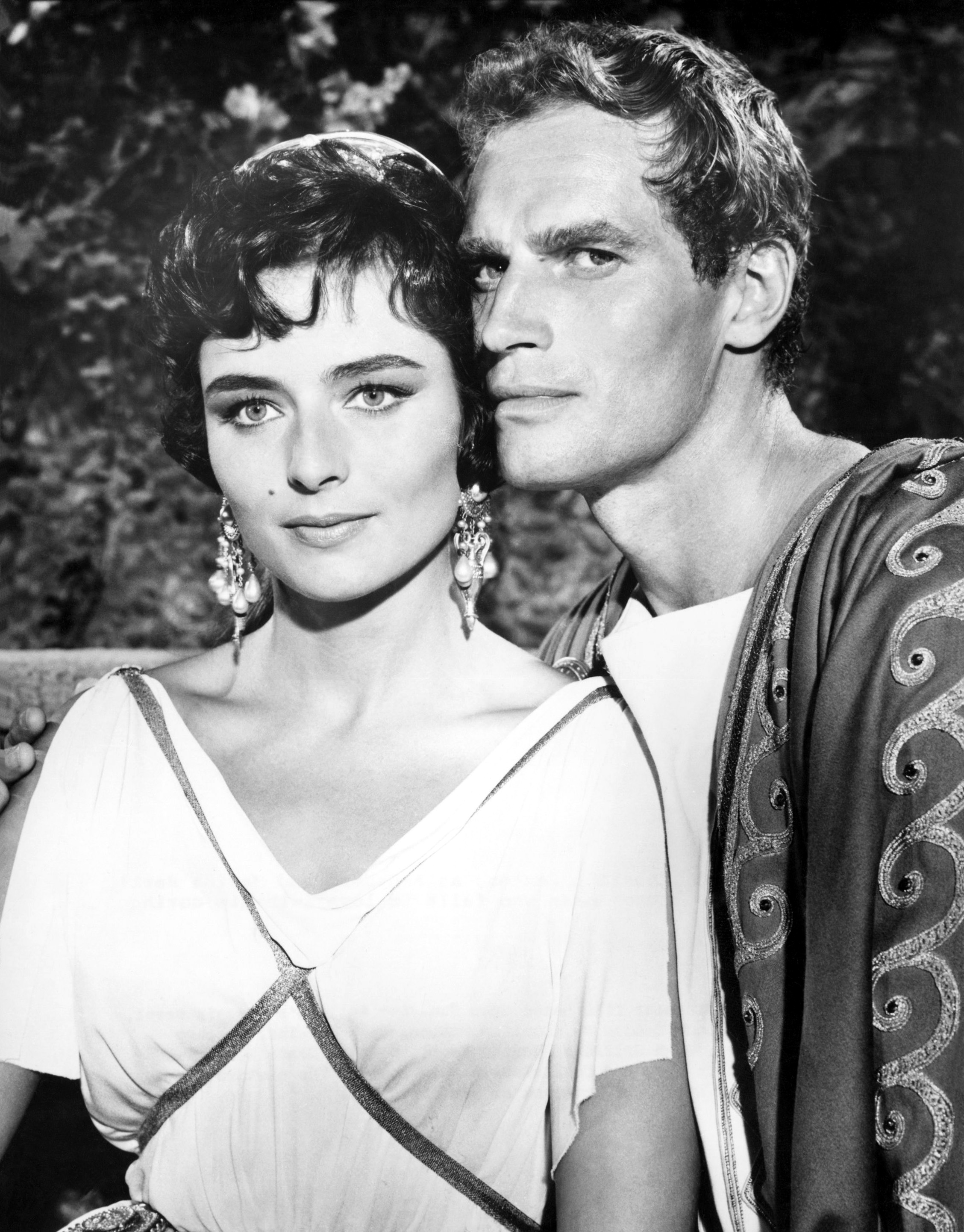
Charlton Heston and Marina Berti in Ben-Hur

Several actors were offered the role of Judah Ben-Hur before it was accepted by Charlton Heston. Burt Lancaster claimed he turned down the role because he found the script boring and belittling to Christianity. (Note: Buford also says MGM offered Lancaster $1 million to star in the picture, and to pay off $2.5 million in debts owed by Lancaster's production company. Still Lancaster refused. See: Buford, p. 190.) Paul Newman turned it down because he said he didn't have the legs to wear a tunic. Marlon Brando, Rock Hudson, (Note: Hudson's agent, Henry Willson, refused to allow Hudson to take the role, believing that historical costume epics were not right for his client. See: Bret, p. 95; Gates and Thomas, p. 125.) Geoffrey Horne, (Note: Industry columnist Louella Parsons claimed that Horne was all but cast in the film, due to his performance in The Bridge on the River Kwai. See: Hofler, p. 320.) and Leslie Nielsen were also offered the role, as were a number of muscular, handsome Italian actors (many of whom did not speak English). Kirk Douglas was interested in the role, but was turned down in favor of Heston, (Note: This inspired Douglas to make Spartacus a year later.) who was formally cast on January 22, 1958. His salary was $250,000 for 30 weeks, a prorated salary for any time over 30 weeks, and travel expenses for his family.

Stephen Boyd was cast as the antagonist, Messala, on April 13, 1958. William Wyler originally wanted Heston for the role, but sought another actor after he moved Heston into the role of Judah Ben-Hur. Wyler tried to interest Kirk Douglas in the role of Messala, but Douglas turned him down. Stewart Granger also turned down the role, reportedly because he did not want to take second billing to Charlton Heston. Boyd was a contract player at 20th Century Fox when Wyler cast him. Because both Boyd and Heston had blue eyes, Wyler had Boyd outfitted with brown contact lenses as a way of contrasting the two men.

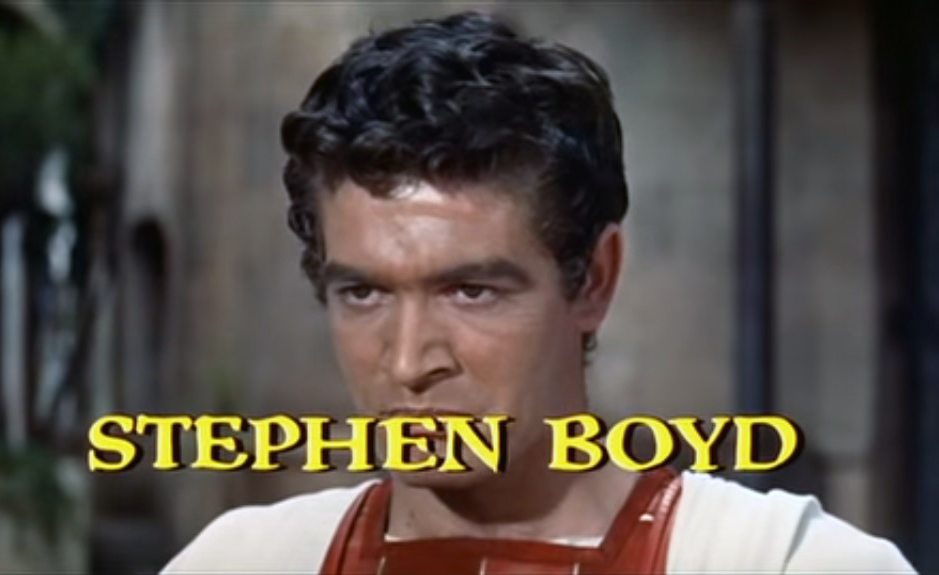
Stephen Boyd

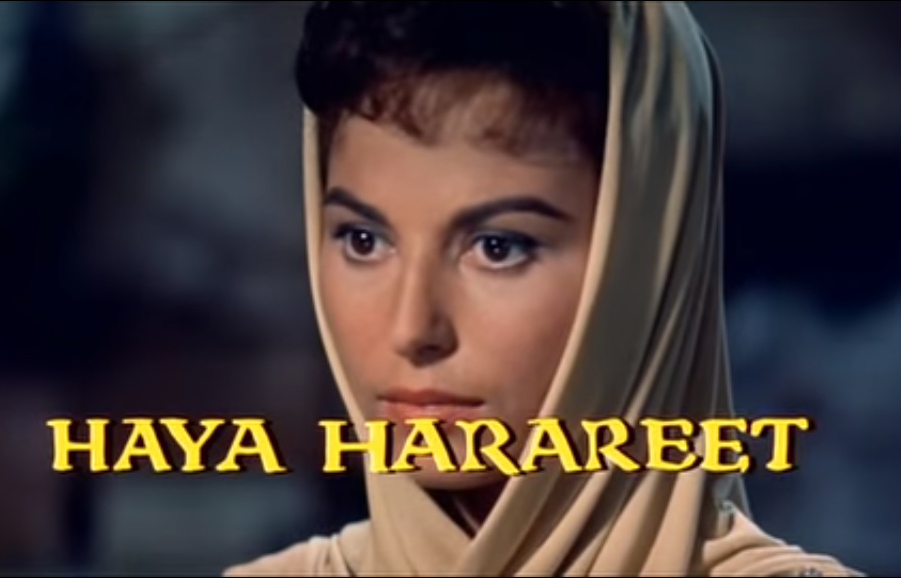
Haya Harareet

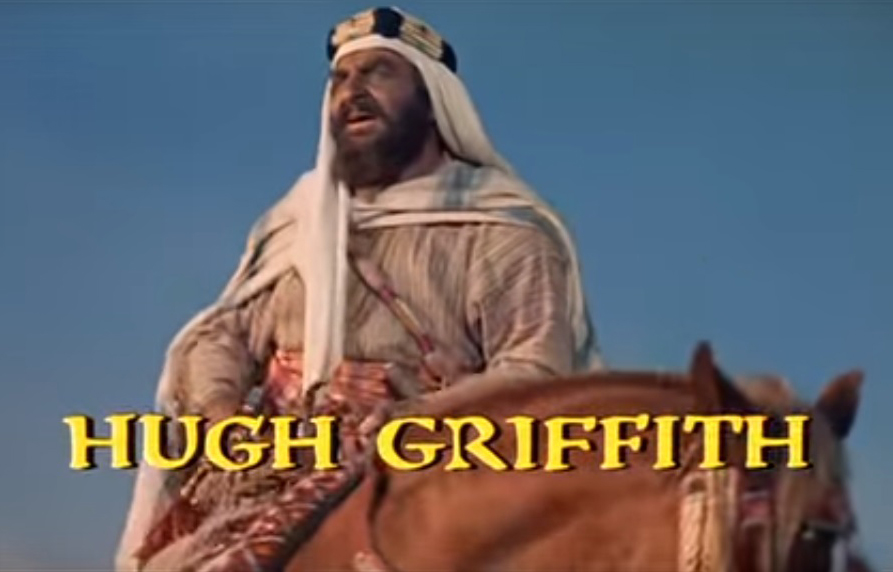
Hugh Griffith

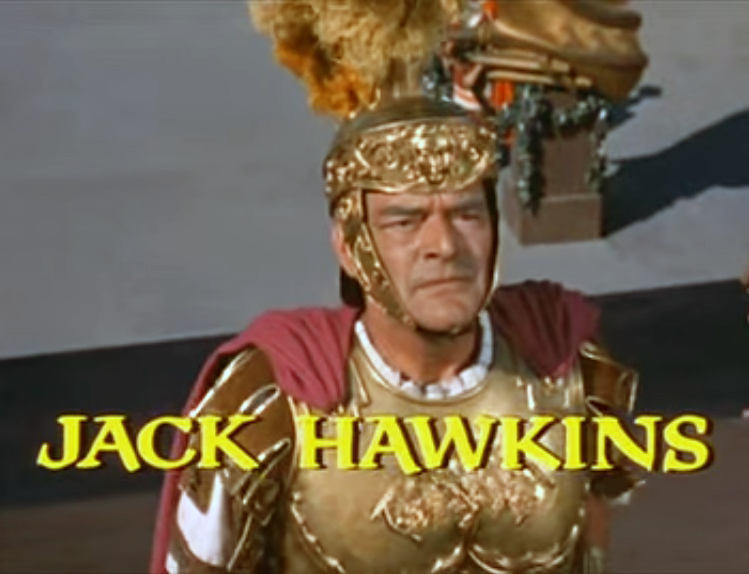
Jack Hawkins

Wyler typically cast the Romans with British actors and the Jews with American actors to help underscore the divide between the two groups. The Romans were the aristocrats in the film, and Wyler believed that American audiences would interpret British accents as patrician. Marie Ney was originally cast as Miriam, but was fired after two days of work because she could not cry on cue. Heston says that he was the one who suggested that Wyler cast Martha Scott (who had played the mother of Heston's Moses in The Ten Commandments, and with whom he'd worked on Broadway) as Miriam. Scott was hired on July 17, 1958. Cathy O'Donnell was Wyler's sister-in-law, and although her career was in decline (Ben-Hur would be her last screen performance) Wyler cast her as Tirzah. More than 30 actresses were considered for the role of Esther. The Israeli actress Haya Harareet, a relative newcomer to film, was cast as Esther on May 16, 1958, after providing a 30-second silent screen test. Wyler had met her at the Cannes Film Festival, where she impressed him with her conversational skills and force of personality. Sam Jaffe was cast as Simonides on April 3, 1958, primarily because he had become famous for his roles as a wise old patriarch in a number of films. Finlay Currie was cast as Balthasar the same day as Jaffe. Wyler had to persuade Jack Hawkins to appear in the film, because Hawkins was unwilling to act in another epic motion picture so soon after The Bridge on the River Kwai. Wyler's efforts at persuasion were successful, and Hawkins was cast on March 18, 1958. Hugh Griffith, who gained acclaim in the post-World War II era in Ealing Studios comedies, was cast as the comical Sheik Ilderim. Finlay Currie had worked with Zimbalist before on Quo Vadis, playing St. Peter, was cast as Balthasar.

Out of respect for the divinity of Jesus Christ and consistent with Lew Wallace's stated preference, (Note: The novel had been adapted to the theater during Wallace's lifetime. Wallace refused to allow any theatrical production which depicted Christ to go forward, so a beam of light was used to represent the presence of Jesus. See: Lennox, p. 169.) Wyler decided before the production began that the face of Jesus would not be shown. The role of Jesus was played by Claude Heater, who was uncredited for the role. Heater was an American opera singer performing with the Vienna State Opera in Rome when he was asked to do a screen test for the film.

In casting, Wyler placed heavy emphasis on characterization rather than looks or acting history. For example, he cast a British actor for the role of the centurion who denies Judah Ben-Hur water at Nazareth. When the actor demanded higher pay, the first assistant director selected a different actor. Wyler, who believed the centurion's reaction to his confrontation with Jesus Christ was critical, shut down the production at a cost of $15,000 while the original actor was retrieved from Rome.

MGM opened a casting office in Rome in mid-1957 to select the 50,000 individuals who would act in minor roles and as extras in the film. The studio announced that casting for leads in the film was complete on September 12, 1958, when Kamala Devi was cast as Iris, Sheik Ilderim's daughter. However, neither the character nor the actress appeared in the film. A total of 365 actors had speaking parts in the film, although only 45 of them were considered "principal" performers. According to The New York Times, only four of the actors (Heston, O'Donnell, Jaffe, and Scott) had worked in Hollywood.

== Production ==
=== Cinematography ===
Robert L. Surtees, who had filmed several of the most successful epics of the 1950s and who had worked with Sam Zimbalist on Quo Vadis in 1951, was hired as cinematographer for the film. Early on in the film's production, Zimbalist and other MGM executives made the decision to film the picture in a widescreen format. Wyler strongly disliked the widescreen format, commenting that "Nothing is out of the picture, and you can't fill it. You either have a lot of empty space, or you have two people talking and a flock of others surrounding them who have nothing to do with the scene. Your eye just wanders out of curiosity." The cameras were also quite large, heavy, and difficult and time-consuming to move. To overcome these difficulties, Surtees and Wyler collaborated on using the widescreen lenses, film stocks, and projection technologies to create highly detailed images for the film. For establishing shots, they planned to show vast lines of marching Roman troops and sailing ships, immense architectural structures lined with thousands of extras, expansive landscapes, and action that moved across the screen. Wyler was best known for composition in depth, a visual technique in which people, props, and architecture are not merely composed horizontally but in depth of field as well. He also had a strong preference for long takes, during which his actors could move within this highly detailed space. Widescreen cinematic technology, however, limited the depth of field. Surtees and Wyler worked to overcome this by creating scenes in which one half of the screen is filled with a foreground object while the other half is filled with a background area, and then rack-focusing between the two as the action shifts from foreground to background. Notable instances of this occur when the injured Messala waits for Judah Ben-Hur to appear in the racecourse surgery, when Judah Ben-Hur hides behind a rock to avoid being seen by his mother and sister in the Valley of the Lepers, and during the Sermon on the Mount.

The movie was filmed in a process known as "MGM Camera 65". 1957's Raintree County was the first MGM film to use the process. The MGM Camera 65 used special 65mm Eastmancolor film stock with a 2.76:1 aspect ratio. 70mm anamorphic camera lenses developed by the Mitchell Camera Company were manufactured to specifications submitted by MGM. These lenses squeezed the image down 1.25 times to fit on the image area of the film stock. The 65mm images were then printed on 70mm film stock. The extra 5mm of space on the film stock allowed the studio to use the new six-track stereo sound, which audiences rarely heard at the time.

To make a 35mm print (the type of film stock most smaller theaters could project), a 35mm print with black borders along the top and bottom of each frame was used. When projected, the 2.76:1 aspect ratio was retained. Because the film could be adapted to the requirements of individual theaters, movie houses did not need to install special, expensive 70mm projection equipment. This allowed more theaters to show the film. Six of the 70mm lenses, each worth $100,000, were shipped to Rome for use by the production. (Note: Most sources agree that the lenses were worth $100,000 each. But at least one source puts the value of each lens at $250,000. See: Herman, p. 406.)

=== Principal photography ===
Wyler left the United States for Italy in April 1958, five months before post-production on Wyler's The Big Country was finished. Wyler authorized his long-time editor, Robert Swink, to edit The Big Country as he saw fit—including the shooting of a new finale, which Swink did. Wyler asked not to be contacted by United Artists over the changes to The Big Country because Ben-Hur would take all his attention, time, and energy. Swink sent him a final cut of the picture in May 1958, which Wyler endorsed.

I spent sleepless nights trying to find a way to deal with the figure of Christ. It was a frightening thing when all the great painters of twenty centuries have painted events you have to deal with, events in the life of the best-known man who ever lived. Everyone already has his own concept of him. I wanted to be reverent, and yet realistic. Crucifixion is a bloody, awful, horrible thing, and a man does not go through it with a benign expression on his face. I had to deal with that. It is a very challenging thing to do that and get no complaints from anybody.

— Wyler on the difficulty of shooting the crucifixion scene.

Pre-production began at Cinecittà around October 1957. The MGM Art Department produced more than 15,000 sketches and drawings of costumes, sets, props, and other items needed for the film (8,000 alone for the costumes); photostatted each item; and cross-referenced and catalogued them for use by the production design team and fabricators. More than a million props were ultimately manufactured. Construction of miniatures for the entrance of Quintus Arrius into Rome and for the sea battle were under way by the end of November 1957. MGM location scouts arrived in Rome ("yet again", according to The New York Times) to identify shooting locations in August 1957. Location shooting in Africa was actively under consideration. In mid-January 1958, MGM said that filming in North Africa (later revealed to be Libya) would begin on March 1, 1958, and that 200 camels and 2,500 horses had already been procured for the studio's use there. The production was then scheduled to move to Rome on April 1, where Andrew Marton had been hired as second unit director and 72 horses were being trained for the chariot race sequence. However, the Libyan government canceled the production's film permit for religious reasons on March 11, 1958, just a week before filming was to have begun. (Note: The Libyan government learned that the production was scheduled to shoot in Israel. Libya, which was at war with Israel, had enacted legislation in 1957 banning any individual or company from doing business with Israel or Jews.) It is unclear whether any second unit filming took place in Israel. A June 8, 1958, reported in The New York Times said Marton had roamed "up and down the countryside" filming footage. However, the American Film Institute claims the filming permit was revoked in Israel for religious reasons as well (although when is not clear), and no footage from the planned location shooting near Jerusalem appeared in the film.

Principal photography began in Rome on May 18, 1958. The script was still unfinished when cinematography began, so that Wyler had only read the first 10 to 12 pages of it. Shooting lasted for 12 to 14 hours a day, six days a week. On Sundays, Wyler would meet with Fry and Zimbalist for story conferences. The pace of the film was so grueling that a doctor was brought onto the set to give a vitamin B complex injection to anyone who requested it (shots that Wyler and his family later suspected may have contained amphetamines). Wyler was unhappy with Heston's performances, feeling they did not make Judah Ben-Hur a plausible character. Wyler shot 16 takes of Heston saying, "I'm a Jew!" By November 1958, the production was becoming bogged down. In part, this was due to the extras. More than 85 percent of the extras had no telephone and no permanent address, so contacting them required using word-of-mouth. It could take several days before all the extras were informed they would be needed. An experienced extra was put in charge of about 30 inexperienced extras, moving them in and out of make-up and wardrobe. On days when there were thousands of extras, individuals would begin getting into costume at 5 A.M., while the last extras would get out of costume around 10 P.M. To speed things up, Wyler often kept principal actors on stand-by, in full costume and make-up, so that he could shoot pick-up scenes if the first unit slowed down. Actresses Martha Scott and Cathy O'Donnell spent almost the entire month of November 1958 in full leprosy make-up and costumes so that Wyler could shoot "leper scenes" when other shots didn't go well. Shooting took nine months, which included three months for the chariot race scene alone.

Principal photography ended on January 7, 1959, with filming of the crucifixion scene. The sequence took four days to film. Heston said that the final day's shoot was such a "flurry of grab shots" that the conclusion of principal photography was hardly remarked.

==== Chariot race sequence ====
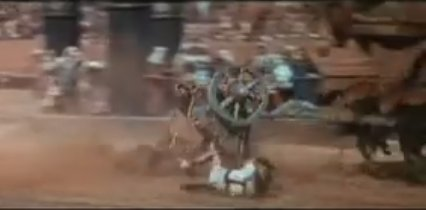
Chariot wreckage in Ben-Hur

The chariot race in Ben-Hur was directed by Andrew Marton and Yakima Canutt, filmmakers who often acted as second unit directors on other people's films. Each man had an assistant director, who shot additional footage. Among these were Sergio Leone, who was senior assistant director in the second unit and responsible for retakes. William Wyler shot the "pageantry" sequence that occurs before the race, scenes of the jubilant crowd, and the victory scenes after the race concludes. The "pageantry" sequence before the race begins is a shot-by-shot remake of the same sequence from the 1925 silent film version. Wyler added the parade around the track because he knew that the chariot race would be primarily composed of close-up and medium shots. To impress the audience with the grandeur of the arena, Wyler added the parade in formation (even though it was not historically accurate).

The original screenwriter, Karl Tunberg, had written just three words ("the chariot race") to describe the now-famous sequence, and no other writer had enlarged on his description. Marton and Canutt wrote 38 pages of script that outlined every aspect of the race, including action, stunts, camera shots and angles. According to editor John Dunning, producer Sam Zimbalist was deeply involved in the planning and shooting of the chariot sequence, and the construction of the arena.

==== Set design ====
The chariot arena was modeled on a historic circus in Jerusalem. Covering 18 acres (7.3 ha), it was the largest film set ever built at that time. Constructed at a cost of $1 million, it took a thousand workmen more than a year to carve the oval out of a rock quarry. The racetrack featured 1,500-foot (460 m) long straightaways and five-story-high grandstands. Over 250 miles (400 km) of metal tubing were used to erect the grandstands. Matte paintings created the illusion of upper stories of the grandstands and the background mountains. The production crew researched ancient Roman racetracks, but were unable to determine what a historic track surface was like. The crew decided to create their own racecourse surface, one that would be hard enough to support the steel-rimmed chariot wheels but soft enough to not harm the horses after hundreds of laps. The construction crew laid down a bed of crushed rock topped by a layer of ground lava and fine-ground yellow rock. More than 40,000 short tons (36,000 t) of sand were brought in from beaches on the Mediterranean to cover the track. Other elements of the circus were historically accurate. Imperial Roman racecourses featured a raised 10 feet (3.0 m) high spina (the center section), metae (columnar goalposts at each end of the spina), dolphin-shaped lap counters, and carceres (the columned building in the rear, which housed the cells where horses waited prior to the race). The four statues atop the spina were 30 feet (9.1 m) high. A chariot track identical in size was constructed next to the set and used to train the horses and lay out the camera shots.

==== Preparation ====
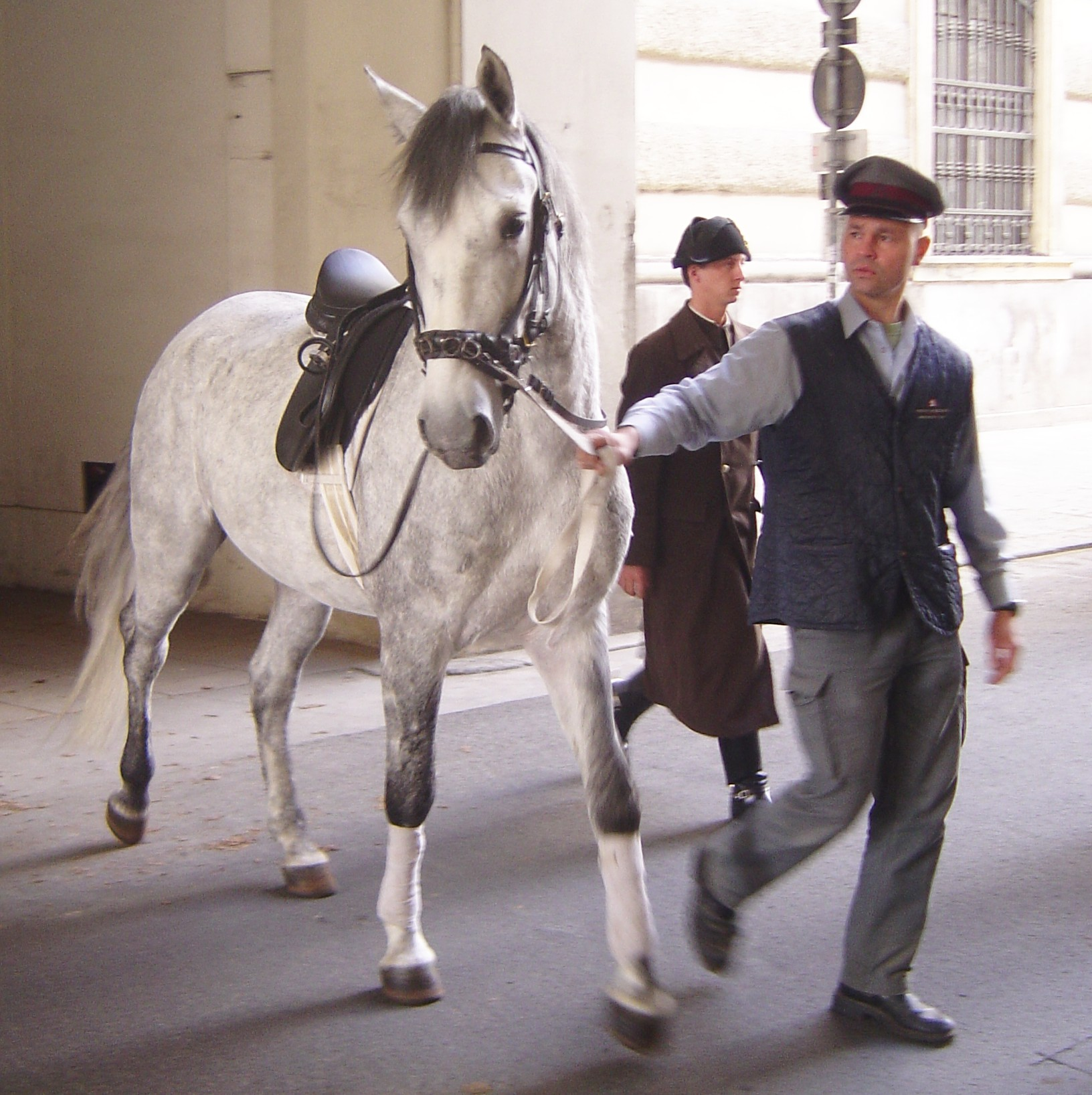
Lipizzan horses, like this one in Vienna, were used for chariot teams in Ben-Hur.

Planning for the chariot race took nearly a year to complete. Seventy-eight horses were bought and imported from Yugoslavia and Sicily in November 1957, exercised into peak physical condition, and trained by Hollywood animal handler Glenn Randall to pull the quadriga (a Roman Empire chariot drawn by four horses abreast). Andalusian horses played Ben-Hur's Arabians, while the others in the chariot race were primarily Lipizzans. A veterinarian, a harness maker, and 20 stable boys were employed to care for the horses and ensure they were outfitted for racing each day. When a blacksmith for making horseshoes could not be found, an 18-year-old Italian boy was trained in the art of blacksmithing in order to do so. The firm of Danesi Brothers built 18 chariots, each weighing 900 pounds (410 kg). Nine were practice chariots. Principal cast members, stand-ins, and stunt people made 100 practice laps of the arena in preparation for shooting. Because the chariot race was considered so dangerous, a 20-bed infirmary staffed by two doctors and two nurses was built next to the set to care for anyone injured during shooting.

Heston and Boyd both had to learn how to drive a chariot. Heston, an experienced horseman, took daily three-hour lessons in chariot driving after he arrived in Rome and picked up the skill quickly. (He also learned sword fighting, how to throw a javelin, camel riding, and rowing.) Heston was outfitted with special contact lenses to prevent the grit kicked up during the race from injuring his eyes. Boyd, however, needed four weeks of training to feel comfortable (but not expert) at driving the quadriga. For the other charioteers, six actors with extensive experience with horses were flown in from Hollywood. Local actors also portrayed charioteers. Among them was Giuseppe Tosi, who had once been a bodyguard for Victor Emmanuel III of Italy.

The production schedule originally called for the chariot race to be shot in the spring, when weather was cooler for the horses and when Wyler would not be placing heavy demands on Heston and Boyd's time. However, the arena surface was not ready, the arena set was not finished, and the horses had not finished their training. Shooting of the chariot sequence began on the same day as principal photography. Once again filming was delayed. The racecourse surface proved so soft that it slowed the horses down and a day of shooting was lost as the yellow rock and all but 3.5 inches (8.9 cm) of crushed lava were removed.

==== Filming ====
Marton and Canutt filmed the entire chariot sequence with stunt doubles in long shot, edited the footage together, and showed the footage to Zimbalist, Wyler, and Heston to show them what the race should look like and to indicate where close-up shots with Heston and Boyd should go. Seven thousand extras were hired to cheer in the stands. (Note: There is dispute over the number of extras used in the chariot race scenes. At least one non-contemporary source puts the number at 15,000. See: Cyrino, p. 73.) Economic conditions in Italy were poor at the time, and as shooting for the chariot scene wound down only 1,500 extras were needed on any given day. On June 6, more than 3,000 people seeking work were turned away. The crowd rioted, throwing stones and assaulting the set's gates until police arrived and dispersed them. Dynamite charges were used to show the chariot wheels and axles splintering from the effects of Messala's barbed-wheel attacks. Three lifelike dummies were placed at key points in the race to give the appearance of men being run over by chariots.

The cameras used during the chariot race also presented problems. The 70mm lenses had a minimum focal length of 50 feet (15 m), and the camera was mounted on a small Italian-made car so the camera crew could keep in front of the chariots. The horses, however, accelerated down the 1,500-foot (460 m) straightaway much faster than the car could, and the long focal length left Marton and Canutt with too little time to get their shots. The production company purchased a more powerful American car, but the horses still proved too fast. Even with a head start, the larger American car could give the filmmakers only a few more seconds of shot time. Since the horses had to be running at top speed for the best visual impact, Marton chose to film the chariot race with a smaller lens with a much shorter minimum focal length. He also decided that the car should stay only a few feet ahead of the horses. This was highly dangerous, for if the car did not make its turns or slowed down, a deadly crash with the horses could occur. The changes, however, solved the problems the camera crew was encountering. As filming progressed, vast amounts of footage were shot for this sequence. The ratio of footage shot to footage used was 263:1, one of the highest ratios ever for a film.

John Dunning and Ralph E. Winters edited the footage of the chariot sequence. According to Dunning, Winters edited most of the chariot race, but the two men discussed it at length with some input from Wyler. The two editors decided that, once the race was under way, one of the charioteers should be killed immediately to demonstrate to the audience that the race was a deadly one. The barb inserts on the hub of Messala's chariot were used repeatedly throughout the sequence to make it obvious that his chariot was highly dangerous. As footage was shot, it was roughly edited by Ralph Winters. If the footage was poor, the stunts didn't come off on camera well, or coverage was lacking, then more footage would be shot. At the end of three months, Dunning says, Winters had so much footage on hand that he asked Dunning to come to Rome to help him edit the final sequence together.

One of the most notable moments in the race came from a near-fatal accident. Joe Canutt, Yakima Canutt's son, did Heston's more dangerous stunts during the sequence. When Judah Ben-Hur's chariot jumps over the wreckage of a chariot in its path, Ben-Hur is almost thrown out of his chariot. He hangs on and climbs back aboard to continue the race. While the jump was planned (the horses were trained to leap over the wreckage, and a telephone pole had been half-buried in the earth to force the chariot to jump into the air), stunt man Joe Canutt was tossed into the air by accident; he incurred a minor chin injury. Marton wanted to keep the shot, but Zimbalist felt the footage was unusable. Marton conceived the idea of showing that Ben-Hur was able to land on and cling to the front of his chariot, then scramble back into the quadriga while the horses kept going. The long shot of Canutt's accident edited together with a close-up of Heston climbing back aboard constitutes one of the race's most memorable moments. Boyd did all but two of his own stunts. For the sequence where Messala is dragged beneath a chariot's horses and trampled to near death, Boyd wore steel armor under his costume and acted out the close-up shot and the shot of him on his back, attempting to climb up into the horses' harness to escape injury. A dummy was used to obtain the trampling shot in this sequence.

In all, the chariot scene took five weeks (spread over three months) to film at a total cost of $1 million and required more than 200 miles (320 km) of racing to complete. Two of the $100,000 70mm lenses were destroyed during the filming of the close-up shots. Once the "pageantry" and victory parade sequences of the race were finished, Wyler did not visit the chariot race set again. Marton asked the editors to put together a rough cut of the film, with temporary sound effects, and then asked Zimbalist to screen it for Wyler to get Wyler's approval for the sequence. Zimbalist said no. Wyler was tired, and might not fully appreciate the rough cut and demand that the whole race be refilmed. Zimbalist changed his mind however and showed the rough cut to Wyler several days later. According to Zimbalist, Wyler said "it's one of the greatest cinematic achievements" he had ever seen. Wyler did not see the final cut of the chariot race until the press screening of Ben-Hur.

==== Myths ====
Several urban legends exist regarding the chariot sequence. One states that a stuntman died during filming. Stuntman Nosher Powell says in his autobiography, "We had a stunt man killed in the third week, and it happened right in front of me. You saw it, too, because the cameras kept turning and it's in the movie." But film historian Monica Silveira Cyrino discounted this statement in 2005, and said there were no published accounts of any serious injuries or deaths during filming of the chariot race. Indeed, the only recorded death to occur during the filming was that of producer Sam Zimbalist, who died of a heart attack at the age of 57 on November 4, 1958, while on the set. MGM executives asked Wyler to take over the executive producer's job, with an extra salary of $100,000. Wyler agreed, although he had assistance from experienced MGM executives as well. Production supervisor Henry Henigson was so overcome by stress-related heart problems during the shoot that doctors feared for his life and ordered him off the set. Henigson, however, returned to the production shortly thereafter and did not die. Nor were any horses injured during the shoot; in fact, the number of hours that the horses could be used each day was actually shortened to keep them out of the summer heat.

Another urban legend states that a red Ferrari can be seen during the chariot race. The book Movie Mistakes claims this is a myth. Heston, in a DVD commentary track for the film, mentions that a third urban legend claims that he wore a wristwatch during the chariot race. Heston points out that he wore leather bracers up to the elbow.

=== Production design ===
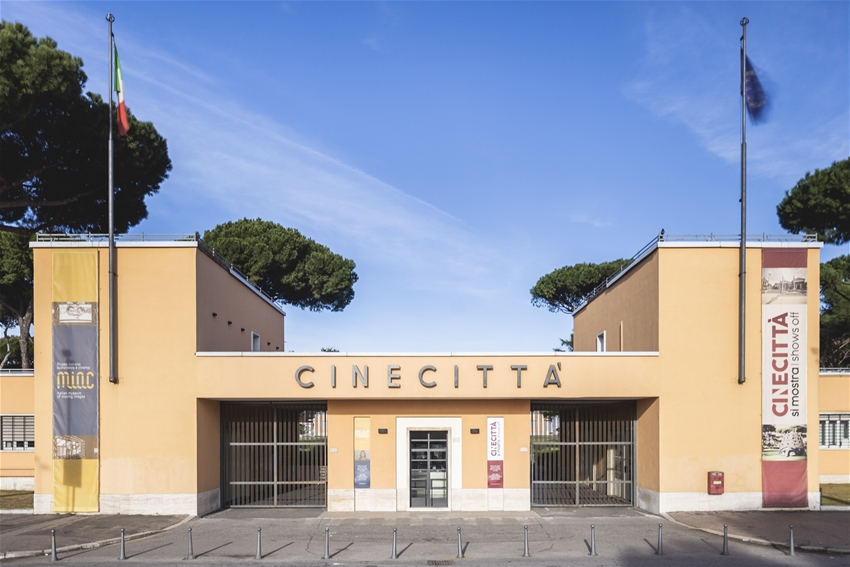
Entrance to Cinecittà in Rome, the largest film studio in Europe, where Ben-Hur was filmed.

Italy was MGM's top choice for hosting the production. However, a number of countries—including France, Mexico, Spain, and the United Kingdom—were also considered. Cinecittà Studios, a very large motion picture production facility constructed in 1937 on the outskirts of Rome, was identified early on as the primary shooting location.

Zimbalist hired Wyler's long-term production supervisor, Henry Henigson, to oversee the film. Henigson arrived in Italy in the spring of 1956. Art directors William A. Horning and Edward Carfagno created the overall look of the film, relying on the more than five years of research that had already been completed for the production. A skeleton crew of studio technicians arrived in the summer of 1956 to begin preparing the Cinecittà soundstages and back lot, and to oversee the construction of additional buildings that would be needed to house the production team. The largest Cinecittà soundstage was not used for filming, but was used as a vast costume warehouse. Another soundstage housed a dry cleaning facility, a traditional laundry, a sculptors' workshop, and a shoe repair facility.

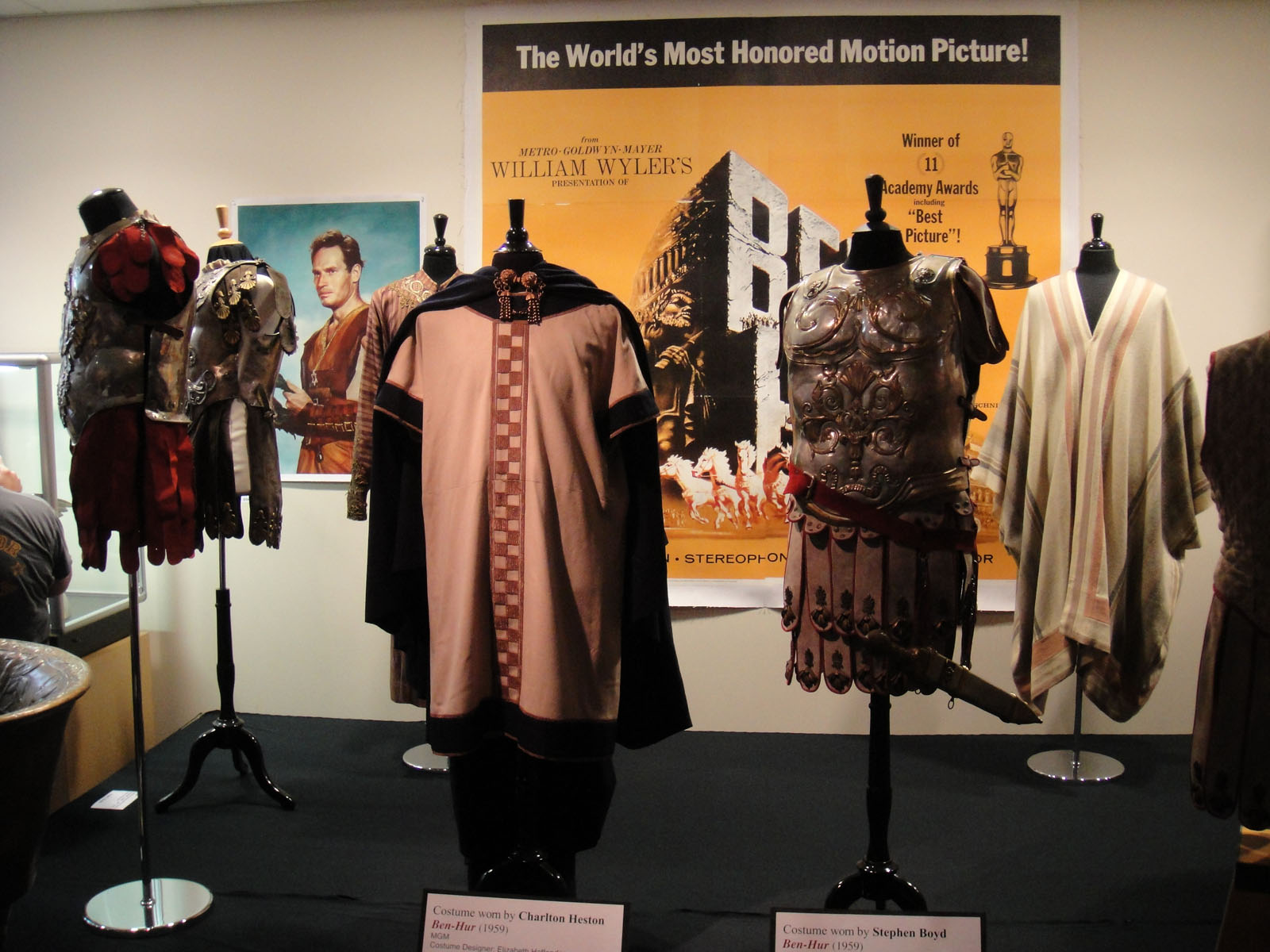
Costumes used in Ben-Hur

The Ben-Hur production utilized 300 sets scattered over 148 acres (60 ha) and nine sound stages. It was filmed largely at Cinecittà Studios. Several sets still standing from Quo Vadis in 1951 were refurbished and used for Ben-Hur. By the end of the production more than 1,000,000 pounds (450,000 kg) of plaster and 40,000 cubic feet (1,100 m^{3}) of lumber were used. The budget called for more than 100,000 costumes and 1,000 suits of armor to be made, for the hiring of 10,000 extras, and the procurement of hundreds of camels, donkeys, horses, and sheep. Costume designer Elizabeth Haffenden oversaw a staff of 100 wardrobe fabricators who began manufacturing the costumes for the film a year before filming began. Special silk was imported from Thailand, the armor manufactured in West Germany, and the woolens made and embroidered in the United Kingdom and various countries of South America. Many leather goods were hand-tooled in the United Kingdom as well, while Italian shoemakers manufactured the boots and shoes. The lace for costumes came from France, while costume jewelry was purchased in Switzerland. More than 400 pounds (180 kg) of hair were donated by women in the Piedmont region of Italy to make wigs and beards for the production, and 1,000 feet (300 m) of track laid down for the camera dollies. A workshop employing 200 artists and workmen provided the hundreds of friezes and statues needed. A cafeteria capable of serving more than 5,000 extras in 20 minutes was also built. The mountain village of Arcinazzo Romano, 40 miles (64 km) from Rome, served as a stand-in for the town of Nazareth. Beaches near Anzio were also used, and caves just south of the city served as the leper colony. Some additional desert panoramas were shot in Arizona, and some close-up inserts taken at the MGM Studios, with the final images photographed on February 3, 1958.

The film was intended to be historically accurate. Hugh Gray, a noted historian and motion picture studio researcher, was hired by Zimbalist as the film's historical advisor. A veteran of the Hollywood historical epic, it was the last film he worked on. Even the smallest details were historically correct. For example, Wyler asked a professor at the University of Jerusalem to copy a portion of the Dead Sea Scrolls for a scene that called for parchment with Hebrew writing on it.

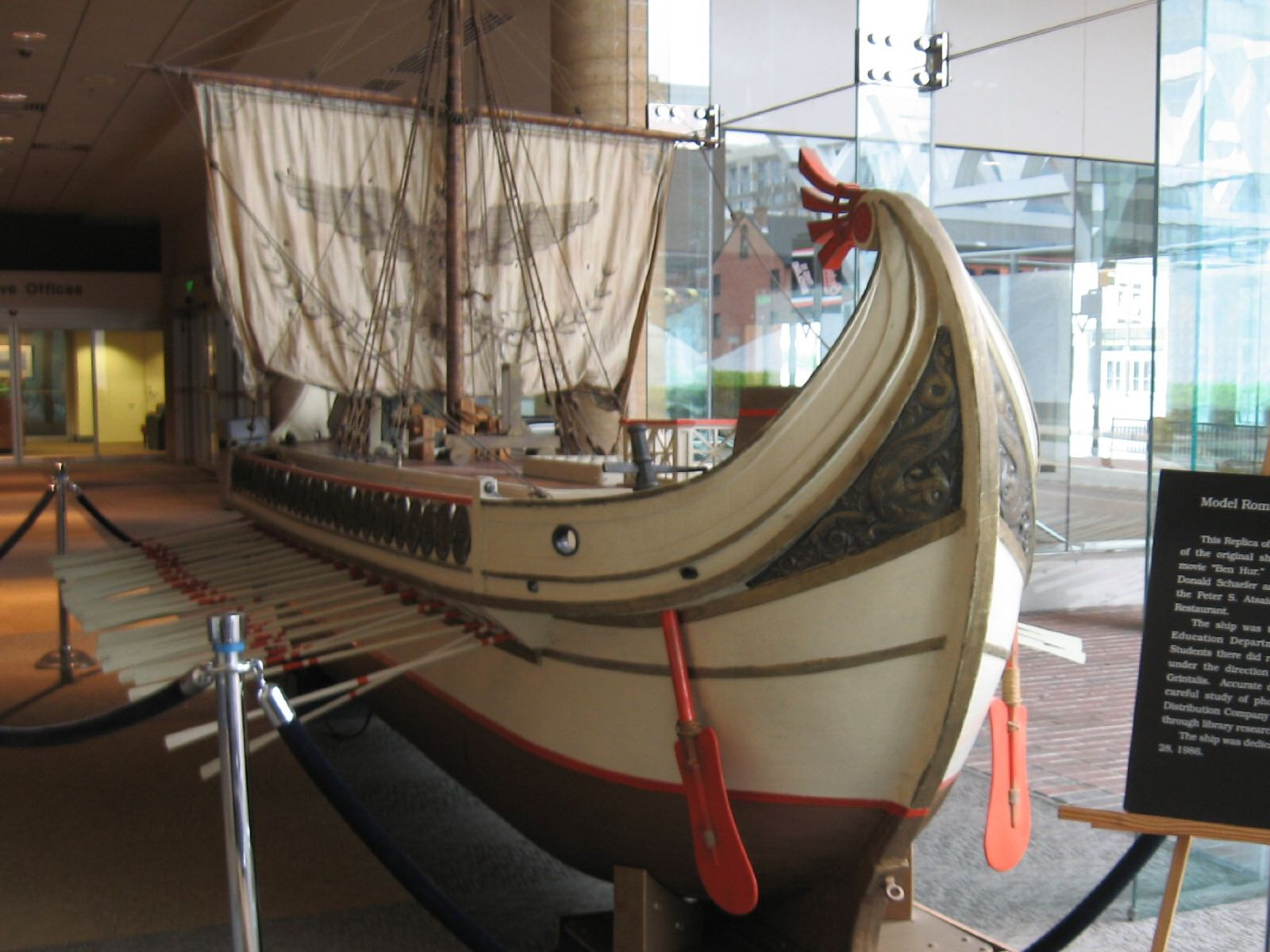
One of the miniature Roman triremes used in Ben-Hur in 1959.

The sea battle was one of the first sequences created for the film, filmed using miniatures in a huge tank on the back lot at the MGM Studios in Culver City, California in November and December 1957. More than 40 miniature ships were built for the sequence. The script contained no description of or dialogue for the sea battle, and none had been written by the time the production schedule got around to filming the live-action sequences. According to editor John Dunning, screenwriter Christopher Fry looked at the miniature footage that Dunning had edited into a rough cut, and then wrote the interior and above-deck scenes. Two 175-foot (53 m) long Roman galleys, each of them seaworthy, were built for the live-action segment. The ships were constructed based on plans found in Italian museums for actual ancient Roman galleys. An artificial lake with equipment capable of generating sea-sized waves was built at the Cinecittà studios to accommodate the galleys. A massive backdrop, 200 feet (61 m) wide by 50 feet (15 m) high, was painted and erected to hide the city and hills in the background. Third unit director Richard Thorpe was hired on July 17, 1958, at the request of William Wyler to film the above-decks sequences, but a directing commitment back in the United States required him to leave the production with filming still incomplete. Dunning says he then directed most of the below-decks scenes, including the sequence in which Quintus Arrius' flagship is rammed. To make the scene bloodier, Dunning sought out Italian extras who had missing limbs, then had the makeup crews rig them with fake bone and blood to make it appear as if they had lost a hand or leg during the battle. When Dunning edited his own footage later, he made sure that these men were not on screen for long so that audiences would be upset. (Note: There was so much footage of the sea battle left over that Charlton Heston used it in his 1972 film Antony and Cleopatra.) The above-decks footage was integrated with the miniature work using process shots and traveling mattes.

Dunning claimed to have directed most of the critical scene in which Quintus Arrius first confronts Judah Ben-Hur on the galley, as well as the following segment in which Arrius forces the slaves to row at high speed. Some of the dialogue in the scene, he says, was shot by Wyler, but most of the rest (including the high-speed rowing) was shot by Dunning himself. Dunning has stated that he spent several days on the high-speed rowing segment, shooting the sequence over and over from different angles to ensure that there was plenty of coverage. He then edited the immense amount of footage down to obtain a rough cut that matched the script, and then re-edited the footage to be more cinematic and to work emotionally on screen. The galley sequence is one of the few scenes in the film that is not historically accurate, as the Roman navy (in contrast to its early modern counterparts) did not employ convicts as galley slaves.

One of the most sumptuous sets was the villa of Quintus Arrius, which included 45 working fountains and 8.9 miles (14.3 km) of pipes. Wealthy citizens of Rome, who wanted to portray their ancient selves, acted as extras in the villa scenes. Among them were the Countess Nona Medici, Count Marigliano del Monte, Count Mario Rivoltella, Prince Emanuele Ruspoli and Prince Raimondo Ruspoli of Italy, the Princess Carmen de Hohenlohe, Prince Cristian Hohenlohe and Count Santiago Oneto of Spain, Baroness Lillian de Balzo of Hungary, and Princess Irina Wassilchikoff of Russia. To recreate the ancient city streets of Jerusalem, a vast set covering 0.5-square-mile (1.3 km^{2}) was built, which included a 75-foot (23 m) high Joppa Gate. The sets were so vast and visually exciting that they became a tourist attraction. Tour buses visited the site hourly, and entertainers such as Harry Belafonte, Kirk Douglas, Susan Hayward, Audrey Hepburn, and Jack Palance traveled to Italy to see the production. The huge sets could be seen from the outskirts of Rome, and MGM estimated that more than 5,000 people were given tours of the sets. Another 25,000 tourists stopped by the studios to see the production in progress. The New York Times reported that thousands more viewed the sets without entering the grounds.

Dismantling the sets cost $125,000. Almost all the filmmaking equipment was turned over to the Italian government, which sold and exported it. MGM turned the title to the artificial lake over to Cinecittà. MGM retained control over the costumes and the artificial lake background, which went back to the United States. The chariots were also returned to the U.S., where they were used as promotional props. The life-size galleys and pirate ships were dismantled to prevent them from being used by competing studios. Some of the horses were adopted by the men who trained them, while others were sold. Many of the camels, donkeys, and other exotic animals were sold to circuses and zoos in Europe.

== Post-production ==
=== Editing ===
According to editor John D. Dunning, the first cut of the film was four and one-half hours long (although a mass media report in March 1959 indicated the running time was closer to five hours). A total of 1,100,000 feet (340,000 m) was shot for the film. William Wyler said his goal was to bring the running time down to three and a half hours. Editors Dunning and Winters saw their job as condensing the picture without losing any information or emotional impact. Dunning later said that he felt some of the leper colony sequence could have been cut. The most difficult editing decisions, he also said, came during scenes that involved Jesus Christ, as these contained almost no dialogue and most of the footage was purely reaction shots by actors. Editing was also complicated by the 70mm footage being printed. Because no editing equipment (such as the Moviola) existed that could handle the 70mm print, the 70mm footage would be reduced to 35mm and then cut. This caused much of the image to be lost, and according to Dunning "you didn't even know what you had until you cut the negative. We'd print up the 70 now and then, and project it to see what we were getting against what we were seeing in the 35. We really did it blind." When the film was edited into its final form, it ran 213 minutes and included just 19,000 feet (5,800 m) of film. It was the third-longest motion picture ever made at the time, behind Gone with the Wind and The Ten Commandments.

The editors had little to do with inserting music into the film. Composer Miklós Rózsa viewed a near-final cut of the film, and then made scoring notes. Afterward, Rózsa consulted with the editors, who made suggestions, and then wrote his score and had music inserted where he wished.

=== Musical score ===
The film score was composed and conducted by Miklós Rózsa, who scored most of MGM's epics. The composer was hired by Zimbalist (Zimbalist had previously commissioned and then set aside a score from Sir William Walton). Rózsa conducted research into Greek and Roman music of the period to give his score an archaic sound while still being modern. Rózsa himself directed the 100-piece MGM Symphony Orchestra during the 12 recording sessions (which stretched over 72 hours). The soundtrack was recorded in six-channel stereo. More than three hours of music were composed for the film, and two-and-a-half hours of it were finally used, making it the longest score ever composed for a motion picture at the time (until the soundtrack to Zack Snyder's Justice League in 2021). Unlike previous efforts for films set in the distant past, Rózsa quoted no ancient Greek or Roman musical themes in his score. But he did re-use music he had composed for Quo Vadis in his Ben-Hur score. Several times when Jesus Christ is depicted on screen, the full orchestra is replaced with a pipe organ.

Rózsa won his third Academy Award for his score. As of 2001, it was the only musical score in the ancient and medieval epic genre of film to win an Oscar. Like most film musical soundtracks, it was issued as an album for the public to enjoy as a distinct piece of music. The score was so lengthy that it had to be released in 1959 on three LP records, although a one-LP version with Carlo Savina conducting the Symphony Orchestra of Rome was also issued. In addition, to provide a more "listenable" album, Rózsa arranged his score into a "Ben-Hur Suite", which was released on Lion Records (an MGM subsidiary which issued low-priced records) in 1959. This made the Ben-Hur film musical score the first to be released not only in its entirety but also as a separate album.

The Ben-Hur score has been considered to be the best of Rózsa's career. The musical soundtrack to Ben-Hur remained deeply influential into the mid 1970s, when film music composed by John Williams for films such as Jaws, Star Wars, and Raiders of the Lost Ark became more popular among composers and film-goers.

Rózsa's score has since seen several notable re-releases. In 1967, Rózsa himself arranged and recorded another four-movement suite of music from the film with the Nuremberg Symphony Orchestra. It was released by Capitol Records. In 1977, Decca Records recorded an album of highlights from the score featuring the United Kingdom's National Philharmonic Orchestra and Chorus. Sony Music reissued the first two of the three-LP 1959 recording (along with selections from the film's actual soundtrack) as a two-CD set in 1991. Rhino Records issued a two-CD release in 1996, which featured remastered original recordings, outtakes from the original film soundtrack, alternate and recording outtakes, and extended versions of some musical sequences. In 2012, Film Score Monthly and WaterTower Music issued a limited edition five-CD set of music from the film. It included a remastered film score (as heard on screen) on two discs; two discs of alternate versions, additional alternate versions, and unused tracks (presented in film order); and the contents of the three-LP MGM and one-LP Lion Records albums on a single disc.

== Bibliography ==
- Alexander, Shana. "Will the Real Burt Please Stand Up?" Life. September 6, 1963.
- Altman, Rick (1992). Sound Theory, Sound Practice. Florence, Ky.: Psychology Press. ISBN 978-0-415-90457-5.
- Belton, John (2012). American Cinema/American Culture. New York: McGraw-Hill Higher Education. ISBN 978-0-07-744347-4.
- Block, Alex Ben; Wilson, Lucy Autrey (2010). George Lucas's Blockbusting: A Decade-by-Decade Survey of Timeless Movies Including Untold Secrets of Their Financial and Cultural Success. New York: HarperCollins. ISBN 978-0-06-196345-2.
- Brosnan, John (1976). Movie Magic: The Story of Special Effects in the Cinema. London: New American Library. ISBN 0-349-10368-2.
- Brownlow, Kevin (1968). The Parade's Gone By. Berkeley, Calif.: University of California Press. ISBN 978-0-520-03068-8.
- Canutt, Yakima; Drake, Oliver (1979). Stunt Man: The Autobiography of Yakima Canutt With Oliver Drake. Norman, Okla.: University of Oklahoma Press. ISBN 978-0-8061-2927-3.
- Casson, Lionel (1971). Ships and Seamanship in the Ancient World. Princeton, N.J.: Princeton University Press. ISBN 0-691-03536-9. "editions:LHns-db8hRIC."
- Cole, Clayton. "Fry, Wyler, and the Row Over Ben-Hur in Hollywood." Films and Filming. March 1959.
- Coughlan, Robert. "Lew Wallace Got Ben-Hur Going—and He's Never Stopped." Life. November 16, 1959.
- Cyrino, Monica Silveira (2005). Big Screen Rome. Malden, Mass.: Blackwell. ISBN 978-1-4051-1683-1.
- Didinger, Ray; Macnow, Glen (2009). The Ultimate Book of Sports Movies: Featuring the 100 Greatest Sports Films of All Time. Philadelphia: Running Press. ISBN 978-0-7624-3921-8.
- Dunning, John D. (1995). "'Good Stuff' Never Changes: John D. Dunning". In Oldham, Gabriella (ed.). First Cut: Conversations With Film Editors. Berkeley, Calif.: University of California Press. ISBN 0-520-07586-2.
- Eagan, Daniel (2010). America's Film Legacy: The Authoritative Guide to the Landmark Movies in the National Film Registry. New York: Continuum. ISBN 978-0-8264-2977-3.
- Eldridge, David (2006). Hollywood's History Films. London: I.B.Tauris. ISBN 978-1-84511-061-1.
- Eyman, Scott (1997). The Speed of Sound: Hollywood and the Talkie Revolution 1926–1930. New York: Simon and Schuster. ISBN 978-1-4391-0428-6.
- Feeney, F.X. "Ben-Gore: Romancing the Word With Gore Vidal." Written By. December 1997-January 1998.
- Frayling, Christopher (2006). Spaghetti Westerns: Cowboys and Europeans From Karl May to Sergio Leone. London: I.B. Tauris & Co. ISBN 978-1-84511-207-3.
- Freiman, Ray (1959). The Story of the Making of Ben-Hur: A Tale of the Christ, from Metro-Goldwyn-Mayer. New York: Random House.
- Giddins, Gary (2010). Warning Shadows: Home Alone with Classic Cinema. New York: W. W. Norton. ISBN 978-0-393-33792-1.
- Haines, Richard W. (1993). Technicolor Movies: The History of Dye Transfer Printing. Jefferson, N.C.: McFarland. ISBN 978-0-7864-1809-1.
- Hall, Sheldon; Neale, Stephen (2010). Epics, Spectacles, and Blockbusters: A Hollywood History. Detroit: Wayne State University Press. ISBN 978-0-8143-3008-1.
- Herman, Jan (1997). A Talent for Trouble: The Life of Hollywood's Most Acclaimed Director, William Wyler. New York: Da Capo Press. ISBN 978-0-306-80798-5.
- Heston, Charlton (1995). In the Arena. New York: Simon & Schuster. ISBN 0-684-80394-1.
- Hezser, Catherine (2009). "Ben Hur and Ancient Jewish Slavery". A Wandering Galilean: Essays in Honour of Seán Freyne. Boston: Brill Academic Publishers. ISBN 978-90-04-17355-2.
- Joshel, Sandra R.; Malamud, Margaret; McGuire, Donald T. Jr. (2005). Imperial Projections: Ancient Rome in Modern Popular Culture. Baltimore: Johns Hopkins University Press. ISBN 978-0-8018-8268-5.
- Kaplan, Fred (1999). Gore Vidal: A Biography. New York: Doubleday. ISBN 0-385-47703-1. "editions:Y7OESYrg5J0C."
- Kinn, Gail; Piazza, Jim (2008). The Academy Awards: The Complete Unofficial History. New York: Black Dog & Leventhal. ISBN 978-1-57912-772-5.
- MacDonald, Laurence E. (1998). The Invisible Art of Film Music: A Comprehensive History. New York: Ardsley House. ISBN 978-0-8108-9058-9.
- Madsen, Axel (1973). William Wyler: The Authorized Biography. New York: Crowell. ISBN 978-0-690-00083-2.
- Magill, Frank Northen; Hanson, Stephen L.; Hanson, Patricia King (1981). Magill's Survey of Cinema: English Language Films, Second Series. Englewood Cliffs, N.J.: Salem Press. ISBN 978-0-89356-232-8.
- McAlister, Melani (2005). Epic Encounters: Culture, Media, and U.S. Interests in the Middle East Since 1945. Berkeley, Calif.: University of California Press. ISBN 978-0-520-24499-3.
- Monush, Barry (2003). Screen World Presents the Encyclopedia of Hollywood Film Actors: From the silent era to 1965. New York: Applause Theatre & Cinema Books. ISBN 978-1-55783-551-2.
- Morsberger, Robert Eustis; Morsberger, Katharine M. (1980). Lew Wallace, Militant Romantic. New York: McGraw-Hill. ISBN 978-0-07-043305-2.
- Parish, James Robert; Mank, Gregory W.; Picchiarini, Richard (1981). The Best of MGM: The Golden Years (1928–59). Westport, Conn.: Arlington House. ISBN 0-87000-488-3.
- Pomerance, Murray (2005). American Cinema of the 1950s: Themes and Variations. New Brunswick, N.J.: Rutgers University Press. ISBN 978-0-8135-3673-6.
- Powell, Nosher; Hall, William (2001). Nosher. London: John Blake Publishing, Limited. ISBN 978-1-85782-491-9.
- Pratt, Douglas (2004). Doug Pratt's DVD: Movies, Television, Music, Art, Adult, and More!, Volume 1. New York: UNET 2 Corporation. ISBN 1-932916-00-8.
- Raymond, Emilie (2006). From My Cold, Dead Hands: Charlton Heston and American Politics. Lexington, Ky.: University Press of Kentucky. ISBN 0-8131-7149-0.
- Rode, Alan K. (2012). Charles McGraw: Biography of a Film Noir Tough Guy. Jefferson, N.C.: McFarland. ISBN 978-1-4766-0035-2.
- Rothwell, Kenneth S. (2004). A History of Shakespeare on Screen: A Century of Film and Television. New York: Cambridge University Press. ISBN 978-0-521-54311-8.
- Sandys, John (2006). Movie Mistakes Take 4. London: Virgin. ISBN 0-7535-1091-X.
- Solomon, Jon (2001). The Ancient World in the Cinema. New Haven, Conn.: Yale University Press. ISBN 978-0-300-08337-8.
- Sultanik, Aaron (1986). Film, a Modern Art. New York: Associated University Presses. ISBN 978-0-8453-4752-2.
- Vidal, Gore. "How I Survived the Fifties." The New Yorker. October 2, 1995.
- Winkler, Martin M. (2001). Classical Myth & Culture in the Cinema. New York: Oxford University Press. ISBN 978-0-19-513004-1.
- Wyler, William (2007). "William Wyler". In Stevens, Jr., George (ed.). Conversations with the Great Moviemakers of Hollywood's Golden Age at the American Film Institute. New York: Random House. ISBN 978-1-40-003314-0.
