= Me So Horny =

1989 single by 2 Live Crew

Single by 2 Live Crew

from the album As Nasty as They Wanna Be
- Released: January 20, 1989
- Recorded: 1988
- Genre: Dirty rap; Miami bass
- Length: 4:36; 4:25 (clean version)
- Label: Luke Records
- Songwriters: Luther Campbell; Mr. Mixx; Brother Marquis; Ricardo Williams; Fresh Kid Ice
- Producer: 2 Live Crew

2 Live Crew singles chronology
"Move Somethin'" (1988)	"Me So Horny" (1989)	"Yakety Yak" (1989)

"Me So Horny" is a song by the rap group 2 Live Crew on their album As Nasty as They Wanna Be. The explicit nature of the lyrics of this song and the album led to the initially successful prosecution of the group on obscenity charges and the album being banned from sale in Florida. This ban was overturned on appeal.

It reached number one on the U.S. Billboard Hot Rap Tracks chart and number 26 on the U.S. Billboard Hot 100 in 1989, staying on the Hot 100 for 30 weeks, despite lack of airplay due to the controversial nature of the lyrics (and/or possibly because of the associated controversy). The song also reached number one in the Netherlands.

The song samples music from the 1979 hit song "Firecracker" by Mass Production and dialogue from the Richard Pryor film Which Way Is Up? and the Stanley Kubrick film Full Metal Jacket.

== Success and controversy ==
The song became a major hit for 2 Live Crew, topping the rap charts and going to No. 26 on the Billboard Hot 100 in 1989. As Nasty as They Wanna Be reached No. 3 on the rap album charts and No. 29 on the album chart. The album eventually sold millions of copies. Because of the controversy, the song's title was never mentioned by Shadoe Stevens when he played the song on the radio show American Top 40, though it did get mentioned on a Summer 1990 episode when the group's second top 40 hit, Banned in the U.S.A. was on the chart.

The success of the single and the album led to concern over the explicit nature of rap lyrics both by 2 Live Crew and by gangsta rappers such as Geto Boys, Ice-T and N.W.A.

Then–Broward County prosecutor Jack Thompson prosecuted 2 Live Crew on obscenity charges and persuaded a Federal District judge to declare the album obscene in June 1990. 2 Live Crew performed songs from the album including "Me So Horny" and were prosecuted for obscenity. Record store clerks who sold copies of the album were also arrested.

Henry Louis Gates Jr. testified on behalf of the group during the trial. The decision was later overturned on appeal and the ruling was upheld by the US Supreme Court. The publicity from the trials led to further sales of the album.

In 2008, it was ranked number 83 on VH1's 100 Greatest Songs of Hip Hop.

== Chart performance ==
=== Weekly charts ===
Weekly chart performance for "Me So Horny"
Chart (1989–1990)	Peak position
Australia (ARIA)	180
Belgium (Ultratop 50 Flanders)	9
Finland (Suomen virallinen lista)	21
Netherlands (Dutch Top 40)	1
Netherlands (Single Top 100)	1
New Zealand (Recorded Music NZ)	31
U.S. Billboard Hot 100	26
U.S. Billboard Hot Rap Tracks	1
U.S. Billboard Hot Dance Music/Club Play	5
U.S. Billboard Hot R&B/Hip-Hop Singles & Tracks	34

=== Year-end charts ===
Year-end chart performance for "Me So Horny"
Chart (1990)	Position
Belgium (Ultratop Flanders)	80
Netherlands (Dutch Top 40)	18
Netherlands (Single Top 100)	32

== Music video ==
The music video mainly features the members of the band rapping while scantily clad women are shown dancing on a stage.

Two versions of the video were ultimately released. The original "uncut" version featured the dancing women in G-string bikini bottoms (with rotoscoped black squares placed over the women's buttocks) and sport brassieres. The MTV version featured alternative lyrics for the song (to comply with MTV's standards and practices) and alternative footage of the dancers in cycling shorts instead of bikinis.

== Covers and re-mixes ==
- American industrial metal act Revolting Cocks covered the song on their 2010 longplayer Got Cock?. The album also included a remix of the track.
- Andy LaPlegua of Combichrist made an EBM version of the song for his solo album "13 Ways to Masturbate" released under the moniker of Dj Scandy.
- An interpolation of the song can be heard on the track "Kitty Kat" from the mixtape Something for Thee Hotties by American rap artist Megan Thee Stallion.
- The M.I.A. song "10 Dollar" (from Arular) features an interpolation of the refrain: "What can I get for ten dollar? Every/any-ting you want"

== Parodies ==
- A comedy hip-hop duo known as 2 Live Jews (whose name is an obvious parody of 2 Live Crew) released a spoof of the song, called "Oy! It's So Humid". This spoof replaces the line, "Me love you long time" with "It's like a sauna in here." This is one of the tracks of their first album, titled As Kosher As They Wanna Be.
- Richard Cheese and Lounge Against the Machine did a Lounge cover on the 2005 album, Aperitif for Destruction.

== See also ==
- Dirty rap
- Miami bass
