= Godzilla vs. Kong (soundtrack) =

Godzilla vs. Kong (Original Motion Picture Soundtrack)

Film score by Tom Holkenborg
- Released: March 31, 2021
- Genre: Film score
- Length: 67:09
- Label: WaterTower Music

Tom Holkenborg chronology
Zack Snyder's Justice League (2021)	Godzilla vs. Kong (Original Motion Picture Soundtrack) (2021)	Army of the Dead (2021)

Professional ratings
Review scores
Source	Rating
Soundtrack Universe	3/5 stars
Filmtracks	2/5 stars
Zanobard Reviews	8/10 stars

Godzilla vs. Kong (Original Motion Picture Soundtrack) is the soundtrack album to the 2021 American monster film Godzilla vs. Kong, composed by Tom Holkenborg. He was announced as a part of the film in June 2020, having had a planned meeting with Wingard two years prior when the film was under pre-production, expressing his interest on working on the score due to his personal love for Godzilla during his teenhood.

The recording of the score took place for nearly two years, and was bundled into a soundtrack album, released by WaterTower Music in digital and physical formats on March 31, 2021, coinciding with the film's United States theatrical release.

== Overview ==
Wingard met Holkenborg in 2018, where Holkenborg admitted to recreationally writing music for Godzilla years prior due to being a fan. Holkenborg subsequently began communicating with the director, tweaked the material, and played it for the director, stating that Wingard was "totally in love". Holkenborg requested a bass drum roughly ten feet in diameter, but the builder was only able to scale it down to eight feet. Holkenborg recalled in a Zoom chat discussion saying that "the score is hyper-modern and the thematic material is also original, but it's written in respect of the history of Kong and Godzilla".

Wingard felt it was "insincere" to repurpose the themes by Akira Ifukube because he associated them with Toho's Godzilla. Instead, Wingard wished to go in a different direction to create themes that were unique to the MonsterVerse's Godzilla, while paying homage to its influences. Holkenborg wanted to create a Godzilla theme that "lived and breathed" the history behind monster themes. Lower brass and big tympanis were used to emphasize the power of Godzilla, and a sound originated from tuba and trombone crashing in quick succession was composed to recreate the musical signature Godzilla theme in 1950. He further wanted Godzilla's theme to be slow and sluggish to reflect Godzilla.

"So Godzilla and Kong always had slow themes, and the reason why they're slow is because when the two are fighting, you're not looking at a ninja fight. It's more like a bar fight between two drunken Irish guys who just came back from fishing boats and they get into a fight […] So that's what this fight is. So you have to be mindful of what has worked in the past, a slow theme instead of [something faster paced]. That's not Godzilla. It's one step and then another step."

— Tom Holkenborg

For Kong's theme, Holkenborg provided an "organic approach" as "the nature of Kong, and it's the closest thing to a human". The sound was interwoven with electronic and sound design elements, and the film score began with melody, and from that point, the score "got colors and orchestration and different types of electronic instruments with it". Two of the themes: "Pensacola, Florida (Godzilla Theme)" and "Skull Island (Kong Theme)" were released on March 7 and 10.

== Track listing ==
The official track list was unveiled on March 17, with a press release regarding the soundtrack release was confirmed by WaterTower Music on the same date.

All music is composed by Tom Holkenborg.

Godzilla vs. Kong (Original Motion Picture Soundtrack)
No.	Title	Length
1.	"Pensacola, Florida (Godzilla Theme)"	2:18
2.	"Skull Island (Kong Theme)"	7:24
3.	"Apex Cybernetics"	2:02
4.	"A New Language"	2:29
5.	"Just Now"	1:50
6.	"Tasman Sea"	9:30
7.	"Through There"	1:25
8.	"Antarctica"	2:36
9.	"Hollow Earth"	3:48
10.	"The Throne"	2:11
11.	"Lunch"	1:59
12.	"Nuclear Blast"	3:59
13.	"The Royal Axe"	4:48
14.	"Mega"	7:39
15.	"Hong Kong"	13:14
Total length:		67:09

== Additional music ==
As with Legendary's previous Godzilla trailers, György Ligeti's "Requiem" was used, followed by "Here We Go" by Chris Classic. Those tracks were neither featured in the film, nor being included in the soundtrack. Additional music, which were used in the film, but not featured in the soundtrack, includes: "Over the Mountain; Across the Sea" by Bobby Vinton, "Loving Arms" by Elvis Presley, "Breaking the Law" by Judas Priest, "A Glowing Light, A Promise" by Makeup and Vanity Set, "Chinese festival" by Derek and Brandon Fletcher and "Tea Ceremony" by Brandon Fletcher. The song "The Air That I Breathe" by The Hollies was used in the credits scene.

For the film's Japanese release, Man with a Mission contributed the track "Into the Deep", which was played only in the Japanese version of the film. Regarding the track's inclusion, Wingard commented, "I'm thrilled that an inspiring song from a groundbreaking band like Man with a Mission will be playing alongside the battle in Godzilla vs. Kong." The music video, which was used for promotional purposes, released on April 15.

== Reception ==
Unlike its predecessor, the soundtrack received mixed reviews from music critics. A positive review from Zanobard Reviews criticized Holkenborg's score of Godzilla's theme stated: "Tom Holkenborg's Godzilla Vs. Kong is loud, ferocious and overall, a pretty well-crafted monster-battling soundtrack that features several excellent new themes; it's just a bit of a shame that Akira Ifukube's iconic Godzilla motif isn't one of them." Critic Jonathan Broxton of Movie Music UK said "There are certainly moments where the score is thoroughly enjoyable [...] Unfortunately, the lack of clear narrative development and dramatic musical storytelling is frustrating, the lack of references to the original Ifukube themes is disappointing, and the over-reliance on occasionally dated and cheap-sounding electronics and simplistic rhythmic drumming makes it pale in comparison to everything that [Alexandre] Desplat, [Henry] Jackman and [Bear] McCreary did." A mixed review from Filmtracks commented "The whole experience with Godzilla vs. Kong's soundtrack is miserably disappointing despite a few fleeting, decent ideas from Holkenborg".

== Sources ==
- Holkenborg, Tom (2021). Godzilla's Theme - Godzilla vs. Kong [Studio Time: S4E3] (YouTube Video). Junkie XL.
- Kalat, David (2010). A Critical History and Filmography of Toho's Godzilla Series (Second ed.). McFarland. ISBN 9780786447497.
- Ryfle, Steve (1998). Japan's Favorite Mon-Star: The Unauthorized Biography of the Big G. ECW Press. ISBN 1550223488.
