= Aperitif for Destruction =

Studio album by Richard Cheese
- Released: May 24, 2005
- Genres: Comedy rock Lounge
- Length: 32:54
- Label: Surfdog Records
- Producers: Noel Melanio; Mark Jonathan Davis

Richard Cheese chronology
I'd Like a Virgin (2004)	Aperitif for Destruction (2005)	The Sunny Side of the Moon: The Best of Richard Cheese (2006)

Professional ratings
Review scores
Source	Rating
AllMusic	3.5/5 stars
ReadJunk	3.5/5 stars

Aperitif for Destruction is the fourth album by Richard Cheese, released May 24, 2005. The album title and artwork parody Guns N' Roses' 1987 album, Appetite for Destruction.

== Track listing ==
1. "Me So Horny" (2 Live Crew) – 2:15
2. "People = Shit" (Slipknot) – 2:03
3. "Welcome to the Jungle" (Guns N' Roses) – 2:41 (interpolates "Jungle Love" by Morris Day and The Time and "The Lion Sleeps Tonight" by The Tokens)
4. "Brass Monkey" (Beastie Boys) – 2:13
5. "Let's Get Retarded" (The Black Eyed Peas) – 1:58
6. "Man in the Box" (Alice in Chains) – 2:23
7. "Been Caught Stealing" (Jane's Addiction) – 1:55
8. "The Girl Is Mine" (Michael Jackson/Paul McCartney) - duet with Stephen Hawking (impersonated) – 2:15
9. "You Oughta Know" (Alanis Morissette) – 2:11
10. "Enter Sandman" (Metallica) (interpolates "Mr. Sandman" by The Chordettes) – 1:50
11. "Sunday Bloody Sunday" (U2) – 1:36
12. "We Are the World" (USA for Africa) – 1:46
13. "Do Me!" (Bell Biv DeVoe) – 1:31
14. "American Idiot" (Green Day) (also a medley with "My Country, 'Tis of Thee", "God Bless America", "The Star-Spangled Banner", "La Cucaracha", "Deck the Halls" and "Tequila") – 1:35
15. "Add It Up" (Violent Femmes) – 1:46
16. "Somebody Told Me" (The Killers) – 2:56
