= Sheila Murnaghan =

Academic background
- Education: Harvard University, Cambridge University, University of North Carolina, Chapel Hill

Academic work
- Discipline: Classics
- Sub-discipline: Classical tradition, Ancient Greek literature
- Institutions: University of Pennsylvania
- Notable students: Monica Cyrino
- Notable works: Disguise and Recognition in the Odyssey

Sheila Murnaghan is the Alfred Reginald Allen Memorial Professor of Greek at the University of Pennsylvania. She is particularly known for her work on Greek epic, tragedy, and historiography.

== Career ==
Murnaghan gained her AB in Classics from Harvard University in 1973 followed by a BA from Cambridge University in 1975 and PhD from the University of North Carolina at Chapel Hill in 1980. Murnaghan taught at Yale University from 1979 until 1990 then moved to the University of Pennsylvania where she is now the Alfred Reginald Allen Memorial Professor of Greek.

Murnaghan works on Greek epic poetry, tragedy, and historiography, gender in classical culture, and the classical tradition. Her groundbreaking work Disguise and Recognition in the Odyssey (Princeton 1987), which was based on her PhD thesis, was republished in 2011.

Murnaghan currently works on the classical tradition, particularly the development of Greek mythology as children's literature in the 19th-20th centuries. She was invited to give a lecture on the subject as part of the Heinz Blum Memorial Lecture Series at Boston College in 2016 and her volume on the subject with Deborah H. Roberts was published in 2018.

== Select publications ==
- Disguise and Recognition in the Odyssey (Princeton 1987, 2nd edition 2011)
- Murnaghan, Sheila (1988-01-01). "How a Woman Can Be More Like a Man: The Dialogue Between Ischomachus and his Wife in Xenophone's Oeconomicus". Helios. 15 (1): 9–22. Archived from the original on September 20, 2019.
- Murnaghan, Sheila (1992). "Maternity and Mortality in Homeric Poetry". Classical Antiquity. 11 (2): 242–264. doi:10.2307/25010975. ISSN 0278-6656. JSTOR 25010975. PMID 18080407. Archived from the original on June 8, 2020.
- Murnaghan, Sheila (1994). "Reading Penelope". In Oberhelman, Steven M.; Kelly, Van; Golsan, Richard Joseph (eds.). Epic and Epoch: Essays on the Interpretation and History of a Genre. Texas Tech University Press. ISBN 9780896723313.
- Murnaghan, Sheila (1995-05-11). "The Plan of Athena". In Cohen, Beth (ed.). The Distaff Side: Representing the Female in Homer's Odyssey. Oxford University Press. ISBN 9780195344738.
- Murnaghan, Sheila (1995-11-01). "Sucking the Juice Without Biting the Rind: Aristotle and Tragic Mimesis". Arethusa. 26 (4): 755–773. doi:10.1353/nlh.1995.0058. ISSN 1080-661X. S2CID 170468444. Archived from the original on June 1, 2020.
- Beissinger, Margaret; Tylus, Jane; Wofford, Susanne; Wofford, Susanne Lindgren (1999-03-31). Epic Traditions in the Contemporary World: The Poetics of Community. University of California Press. ISBN 9780520210387.
- Murnaghan, Sheila (2009-01-01). "Tragic Bystanders: Choruses And Other Survivors In The Plays Of Sophocles". The Play of Texts and Fragments: 321–333. doi:10.1163/ej.9789004174733.i-580.56. ISBN 9789047428190.
- Murnaghan, Sheila (2009). "Penelope's Agnoia: Knowledge, Power, and Gender in the Odyssey". In Doherty, Lillian Eileen (ed.). Homer's Odyssey. Oxford University Press. ISBN 9780199233328.

=== Co-authored works ===
- with Sandra R. Joshel Women and Slaves in Greco-Roman Culture: Differential Equations (Routledge 1998)
- with Deborah H. Roberts "Penelope's Song: The Lyric Odysseys of Linda Pastan and Louise Glück," Classical and Modern Literature 22 (2002): 1-33
- with Hunter Gardner Odyssean Identities In Modern Cultures: The Journey Home (Ohio State University Press 2014)
- with Deborah H. Roberts Childhood and the Classics: Britain and America, 1850-1965 (Oxford University Press 2018)
- with Ralph M. Rosen Hip Sublime: Beat Writers and the Classical Tradition (Ohio State University Press 2018)
