= Army of the Dead (soundtrack) =

Army of the Dead (Music From the Netflix Film)

Soundtrack album by Tom Holkenborg
- Released: May 21, 2021
- Recorded: 2020–2021
- Genre: Film score; electronic
- Length: 48:42
- Label: Maisie Music Publishing; Milan Records
- Producer: Tom Holkenborg

Tom Holkenborg chronology
Godzilla vs. Kong: Original Motion Picture Soundtrack (2021)	Army of the Dead (Music From the Netflix Film) (2021)	The 355 (2022)

Army of the Dead (Music From the Netflix Film) is the soundtrack album to the 2021 American film Army of the Dead, directed by Zack Snyder. The soundtrack was released by Milan Records on May 21, 2021, coinciding the day with its global release on Netflix. It features 12 tracks from the original score composed by Tom Holkenborg, also known as Junkie XL, and the Elvis Presley song "Viva Las Vegas" (performed by Richard Cheese and Allison Crowe). In addition, a limited edition 2-disc vinyl set of the soundtrack was released on September 10.

== Development ==
"Army of the Dead was a chance to start something very new and fresh, which is certainly ironic for a movie about the undead! It was such a fun project as we got to rip up the rule book, and really re-examine what a zombie movie could sound like. It's a lot of fun!"

— Tom Holkenborg, in an interview with Collider.

Snyder's norm collaborator and Dutch composer Tom Holkenborg confirmed on a Reddit AMA in May 2020 that he would be composing the film's score. This marked his third film with the director after 300: Rise of an Empire (2014), Batman v Superman: Dawn of Justice (2016) and Zack Snyder's Justice League (2021). (Note: Also known as Snyder Cut) (Note: Holkenborg was originally intended to score for the theatrical version of Justice League, before being replaced by Danny Elfman following Snyder's departure and Joss Whedon's arrival. When Snyder got the chance to finish and release his version of the film, Holkenberg was brought back and decided to rescore the film from scratch, with Elfman's score being disregarded.) In an interview, Holkenborg recalled that Snyder told him to make the music "modern, make it unworldly, make it as emotional as you can with soft, dark, underlining haunting elements." To accomplish this, he created a "totally electronic score [...] packed with adrenaline-pumping music" that Snyder later said he enjoyed.

While Holkenborg was expected to contribute to the music of the prequel Army of Thieves (also released in the same year) and the tie-in animated series Army of the Dead: Lost Vegas, the former's director Matthias Schweighöfer announced that Hans Zimmer and Steve Mazzaro will serve as composers for the film, replacing Holkenborg. He is also expected to return for the direct sequel, whose title Planet of the Dead was announced in October 2021.

== Release ==
Army of the Dead (Music From the Netflix Film) was released to streaming and digital download on May 21, 2021, coinciding with the Netflix release. Before the album's release, the track list consisting of 12 songs being launched on May 13, and a preview single from the album, the Elvis Presley song "Viva Las Vegas" (performed by Richard Cheese and Allison Crowe), was released the same date. The album was released in physical formats on July 9, 2021. In addition, a limited edition 2-disc vinyl set of the soundtrack was announced by Waxwork Records, the co-distributor of the vinyl CDs and pre-orders for the vinyl album began on May 28. This limited edition soundtrack consists of 180-gram neon pink and yellow disc vinyl, consists of six tracks each. A new artwork design by Oliver Barrett and exclusive liner notes were also contained in this edition. The vinyl edition released in US on September 10.

== Track listing ==
All music is composed by Tom Holkenborg.

No.	Title	Length
1.	"Viva Las Vegas" (Performed by Richard Cheese and Allison Crowe)	5:55
2.	"Scott and Kate Part 1"	5:24
3.	"Scott and Kate Part 2"	2:49
4.	"Scott and Kate Part 3"	4:42
5.	"Toten Hosen"	3:56
6.	"Swimming Pool"	1:05
7.	"Not Here"	1:50
8.	"3 Flares"	4:42
9.	"Battle Hallway Part 1"	4:00
10.	"Battle Hallway Part 2"	6:41
11.	"Zeus and Athena Part 1"	3:17
12.	"Zeus and Athena Part 2"	4:14
Total length:		48:42

== Additional music ==
Additional music that is not listed in the soundtrack album includes Presley's "Suspicious Minds" and "Night Life", Thea Gilmore's cover of "Bad Moon Rising", Control Machete's "Sí Señor", "The End" by the Raveonettes, Culture Club's "Do You Really Want to Hurt Me", "Siegfried's Funeral March" from Götterdämmerung, and the acoustic version of the Cranberries' "Zombie".

== Reception ==
The soundtrack received mostly positive reviews. From Decider, Anna Menta commented that she found the soundtrack album to be "consistently perfect" and said "Each song seems to capture the grizzled but colorful vibe of killing zombies in the desert—like a western that knows how to have fun". Writing for the PopSugar website, Divya Meena called it as "an exceptionally great soundtrack that not only enhances the cinematic experience but also drives the emotion home" and also hailed it as "one of 2021's best soundtracks".

Contrarily, a reviewer from Film Music Central gave a negative review saying that "the music crashes together in a rising crescendo that, if it takes place in the moment, where music and picture work together perfectly". Movie Wave-based critic James Southall wrote: "It's no surprise to hear music in this style written for a movie like this, but it is odd that Snyder used pretty famous tuneful songs (albeit cover versions) for so much of the movie and asked for such dark, relentless music from Holkenborg for the score. And the thing with film music is that because it can be essentially any style of music at all, if it's in a style you don't like – then it doesn't really matter how well it may be written, the album isn't going to be for you."

== Charts ==
Chart performance for Army of the Dead (Music From the Netflix Film)
Chart (2021)	Peak position
US Billboard 200	56
US Soundtrack Albums (Billboard)	47
