= 2 Live Jews =

Former hip hop parody duo

- Genres: Comedy hip hop
- Years active: 1990–1998
- Labels: Hot Productions; Empire Musicwerks/VI Music/Universal Records
- Members: Moisha MC; Easy Irving

2 Live Jews was a comedy hip hop duo composed of MC Moisha (Eric Lambert) and Easy Irving (Joe Stone). Its name is a parody of 2 Live Crew. The duo were known for songs that mixed and spoofed hip hop culture and Jewish American stereotypes; the members were purportedly two elderly Jewish men who had recently discovered their rhyming ability. In reality, Lambert and Stone were young men who were raised Jewish.

== Style ==
2 Live Jews' original rhyming style incorporated hip hop lyrics typical of the golden age hip hop of the early 1990s, mixed with singing and traditional Jewish music. Its lyrics tended toward cliché or stereotypical Ashkenazi Jewish topics. In keeping with Jewish stereotypes the duo's lyrics are full of Yiddish words, often unknown to most non-Yiddish speakers. Despite Moisha and Irving's true ages, they adopted haggard voices for effect.

== History ==
2 Live Jews released its debut album, As Kosher as They Wanna Be, in 1990. The name of the group and the album were spoofs of 2 Live Crew's 1989 hit album, As Nasty as They Wanna Be. With songs such as "Oy! It's So Humid" (a parody of 2 Live Crew's hit "Me So Horny"), "Young Jews be Proud," and "Shake Your Tuchas" (which borrowed liberally from KC and the Sunshine Band's "(Shake, Shake, Shake) Shake Your Booty"), the album was a success and launched 2 Live Jews into the spotlight. Billboard magazine reviewed the album as "funny all the way through. It might not age well, but the first listening is hilarious and the raps are better than one could reasonably expect." The duo appeared on MTV, Regis and Kathie Lee, and other media outlets.

As Kosher as They Wanna Be was the duo's most successful and popular album. 2 Live Jews released four others. Fiddling With Tradition (1991), a hip-hop reworking of the 1964 musical, Fiddler on the Roof; it got only minor attention and was not a success. 2 Live Jews released Disco Jews in 1994, and Christmas Jews in 1998. On VH1, the duo guest-starred as talking heads for the special "40 Least Hip Hop Moments." In 2005, Moisha and Irving released a greatest-hits album, The Worst of 2 Live Jews...the Best of the Shticks. In 2010 they released the single "What's with the Pants".

== Discography ==
- As Kosher As They Wanna Be (1990), Hot Productions
- Fiddling With Tradition (1991), Hot Productions
- Disco Jews (1994), Hot Productions
- Christmas Jews (1998), Hot Productions
- The Worst of 2 Live Jews...the Best of the Shticks (2005), Empire Musicwerks/VI Music/Universal Records
