= Zack Snyder's Justice League (soundtrack) =

Zack Snyder's Justice League (Original Motion Picture Soundtrack)

Soundtrack album by Tom Holkenborg
- Released: March 18, 2021
- Recorded: 2020–2021
- Genres: Film score; electronic
- Length: 234:09
- Label: WaterTower
- Producer: Tom Holkenborg

Tom Holkenborg chronology
Scoob! (Original Motion Picture Score) (2020)	Zack Snyder's Justice League (Original Motion Picture Soundtrack) (2021)	Godzilla vs. Kong (Original Motion Picture Soundtrack) (2021)

Singles from Zack Snyder's Justice League (Original Motion Picture Soundtrack)
- 1. "The Crew at Warpower" Released: February 17, 2021; 2. "Middle Mass" Released: March 12, 2021

Zack Snyder's Justice League (Original Motion Picture Soundtrack) is the soundtrack to the film of the same name, itself a director's cut of the 2017 theatrical film which had its own soundtrack. Tom Holkenborg, also known as Junkie XL, composed the film's score; he had previously worked on a score for the theatrical version of Justice League, before being replaced by Danny Elfman following original director Zack Snyder's departure and Joss Whedon's arrival. Upon Snyder getting the chance to finish and release his version of the film, Holkenberg was brought back and decided to rescore the film from scratch. The album was released via WaterTower Music on March 18, 2021, the same day as the film's release, and was later released as a limited-edition 7-disc vinyl set on April 14. The film's score is notable as the longest in film history at nearly four hours long.

== Overview ==
When Holkenborg was rehired to score the "Snyder Cut" in early 2020, he decided to scrap his original score and make a brand new one for the film, which consists of fifty-four tracks and is three hours and 54 minutes long. The length of the score broke the long held 3-hour record of 1959's Ben-Hur by nearly a full hour, becoming the longest musical score in film history. While Holkenberg originally stated that he had finished the score, it turned out not to be the case as he had only finished 55 minutes of the original two hour mandate, having the rest of the film be covered by music demos from other films. It took Holkenberg 8 months to complete the score for the full 4-hour film, which he called "unique" and "challenging" as it was longer than most films, but had to maintain a consistent flow as opposed to episodes of a television series. Holkenberg also discarded his previous work out of respect for Snyder's late daughter, Autumn, whose death was one of the main reasons for both their departures from the original film.

The score features reprisals of Hans Zimmer's Superman themes from Man of Steel and Batman v Superman: Dawn of Justice, as well as the Wonder Woman and Lex Luthor themes from the latter film on which Zimmer collaborated with Holkenborg. This is markedly different from the theatrical cut's score, which uses reprisals of John Williams' Superman theme from the 1978–87-film series and Elfman's Batman theme from the 1989–92-film series, and only featuring a brief reprise of Wonder Woman's DCEU theme. Rather than fully re-using the Batman theme from Dawn of Justice, Holkenborg opted to create a new theme for the character in Justice League to reflect how he has developed from the tormented character depicted in Dawn of Justice. The theme from Dawn of Justice is briefly heard again in Justice League, albeit not as the primary Batman theme. As for Wonder Woman, Holkenborg reused her Dawn of Justice theme but incorporated elements of world music and electronica to revamp it. He decided to "showcase another side of Diana's personality" by making her theme more aggressive, as opposed to the previous approach of "softening" her theme to reflect her femininity. The "Ancient Lamentation" vocal motif was sung by Iranian singer Delaram Kamareh.

The first track from the score, "The Crew at Warpower", was released on February 17, 2021. Holkenborg has described this score as a "national anthem" for Snyder's Justice League and has confirmed this plays during the 10 minute intermission halfway through theatrical screenings of the movie. A second track, "Middle Mass", was released on March 12. Holkenborg described the score as "fully electronic [at times], and at other times fully orchestral", incorporating elements of rock and trap.

The beginning of the movie features a traditional Icelandic song "Vísur Vatnsenda-Rósu" (sung by Yong Aus Galeson but lip-synced by Icelandic actress Salóme Gunnarsdóttir in the scene) which however does not appear on the soundtrack. Allison Crowe's cover of the Leonard Cohen song "Hallelujah" plays during the end credits as a tribute to Autumn Snyder.

== Track listing ==
Track listing and credits adapted from Spotify and Tidal.

All music is composed by Tom Holkenborg, except where noted.

Zack Snyder's Justice League (Original Motion Picture Soundtrack)
No.	Title	Composer(s)	Length
1.	"Song to the Siren" (Tim Buckley cover, performed by Rose Betts)	Buckley; Larry Beckett	3:17
2.	"A Hunter Gathers"		7:57
3.	"Migratory"		0:57
4.	"Things Fall Apart"		1:04
5.	"Wonder Woman Defending / And What Rough Beast"	Hans Zimmer; Mark Andrew Wherry; Melissa Muik; Robert Badami; Steve Mazzaro; Holkenborg	7:20
6.	"World Ending Fire"		9:23
7.	"Middle Mass"		1:18
8.	"Long Division"		1:13
9.	"No Paradise, No Fall"		4:11
10.	"The Center Will Not Hold, Twenty Centuries of Stony Sleep"	Zimmer; Holkenborg	8:56
11.	"As Above, So Below"		2:28
12.	"No Dog, No Master"		8:14
13.	"Take This Kingdom by Force"		1:44
14.	"A Splinter from the Thorn That Pricked You"	Zimmer; Holkenborg	1:09
15.	"Cyborg Becoming / Human All Too Human"		10:35
16.	"The Path Chooses You"		2:12
17.	"Aquaman Returning / Carry Your Own Water"		8:22
18.	"The Provenance of Something Gathered"		1:14
19.	"We Do This Together"		12:57
20.	"The Will to Power"		5:20
21.	"Smoke Become Fire"		1:39
22.	"I Teach You, the Overman"	Zimmer; Holkenborg	4:19
23.	"A Glimmer at the Door of the Living"		1:01
24.	"How We Achieve Ourselves"		1:43
25.	"The Sun Forever Rising"		1:31
26.	"Underworld"	Zimmer; Holkenborg	5:49
27.	"Superman Rising, Pt. 1 / A Book of Hours"	Zimmer; Holkenborg	2:40
28.	"Beyond Good and Evil"		4:24
29.	"Monument Builder"		2:29
30.	"Monument Destroyer"		6:08
31.	"Urgrund"	Zimmer; Holkenborg	1:49
32.	"So Begins the End"		4:49
33.	"The House of Belonging"	Zimmer; Holkenborg	2:37
34.	"Earthling"	Zimmer; Holkenborg	3:24
35.	"Flight Is Our Nature"		1:54
36.	"Indivisible"		2:33
37.	"And the Lion-Earth Did Roar, Pt. 1"		5:22
38.	"And the Lion-Earth Did Roar, Pt. 2"		5:32
39.	"Superman Rising, Pt. 2 / Immovable"	Zimmer; Holkenborg	1:55
40.	"At the Speed of Force"		4:20
41.	"My Broken Boy"		2:16
42.	"That Terrible Strength"		1:51
43.	"An Eternal Reoccurrence of Change"		1:45
44.	"We Slay Ourselves"		5:52
45.	"Your Own House Turned to Ashes"	Benjamin Wallfisch; Zimmer; Mazzaro; Holkenborg	3:16
46.	"All of You Undisturbed Cities"	Zimmer; Wherry; Muik; Badami; Holkenborg	6:15
47.	"The Art of Preserving Fire"		1:27
48.	"The Crew at Warpower"		6:49
49.	"The Foundation Theme"		2:08
50.	"Batman, a Duty to Fight / To See"		5:30
51.	"Batman, an Invocation to Heal / To Be Seen"		8:36
52.	"Wonder Woman, a Call to Stand / A World Awakened"	Zimmer; Wherry; Muik; Badami; Mazzaro; Holkenborg	5:10
53.	"Flash, the Space to Win / Our Legacy Is Now"		11:14
54.	"Hallelujah" (Leonard Cohen cover, performed by Allison Crowe)	Cohen	6:11
Total length:			234:09

Music appearing in the film and not included on the soundtrack:

#	Title	Performer(s)
1	"Vísur Vatnsenda-Rósu"	Yong Aus Galeson
2	"Distant Sky"	Nick Cave and the Bad Seeds
3	"There Is a Kingdom"	Nick Cave and the Bad Seeds

== Reception ==
Holkenberg's score received polarized reviews from critics. Nadine Smith of Pitchfork noted Holkenberg's ability to create a distinctive soundtrack, otherwise describing the soundtrack as "aggressively long, ambitiously overstuffed, and deeply polarizing", but praised both the film and the soundtrack as director Zack Snyder and Holkenborg's unfiltered vision. Certain tracks such as "At the Speed of Force" were deemed the most memorable, and some pieces contributed to the impact of their respective scenes in the film. Fans enjoyed the revamped themes for several characters, including the "Ancient Lamentation" motif associated with Wonder Woman and the Amazons, though others called the motif "overused" and "annoying" and turned it into an internet meme. Christian Clemmenson of Filmtracks did not enjoy the soundtrack. He felt the soundtrack had no narrative and was too derivative of Hans Zimmer's work on previous DCEU films. Conversely, James Southall of Movie Wave awarded the soundtrack four out of five stars, considering it "the finest music of [Holkenborg's] career so far". In Zanobard Reviews, the soundtrack was praised as well, stating that the score "marks a triumphant return to the hopeful musical world established and maintained by Man Of Steel and Batman V Superman, with a killer main theme for the League that combined with several standout action setpieces and many a thematic reprise genuinely make it one of the best superhero scores around."

Professional ratings
Review scores
Source	Rating
Pitchfork	6.5/10
Filmtracks	2/5 stars
Movie Wave	4/5 stars
Zanobard Reviews	10/10
