= Monica Cyrino =

American classical scholar

Monica Silveira Cyrino
- Born: May 5, 1962 (age 64)
- Occupation: Professor of Classics
- Spouse: Brian Patrick Cooke

Academic background
- Education: University of California, Berkeley (BA); Yale University (PhD)
- Thesis: In the Pithos of Pandora: Images of Disease and Madness for Erotic Experience in Early Greek Poetry (1992)
- Doctoral advisor: Sheila Murnaghan

Academic work
- Discipline: Classics
- Sub-discipline: Classical reception studies
- Institutions: University of New Mexico

Monica Cyrino is a professor of classics at the University of New Mexico. She is an expert in Classical reception studies, described as a "leading academic" in the field. Her work focuses particularly on modern film and TV, and she has also served as a historical consultant for multiple modern productions.

== Early life and education ==
Cyrino attended Marina High School where she was a cheerleader and among 117 students at Orange County high schools advancing in Merit Scholar Contest. She was a first prize winner in the feature category in a high school journalism event.

Cyrino received her BA from University of California, Berkeley in Classical Languages in 1984, and studied for an MA, MPhil and PhD in Classical Philology at Yale University between 1986 and 1992. Until 1990 she taught as a Teaching Assistant at Yale, before moving to the University of New Mexico, first as a Visiting assistant professor, and from 1993 as assistant professor in classics. In 2007 she was promoted to Professor of Classics, and since 2018 has held a Chair of Languages, Cultures, and Literature at the University of New Mexico.

== Career ==
Cyrino was awarded an Society for Classical Studies 'Excellence in Teaching' award in 1998–9, and a Hood Fellowship in 2018. She was also awarded an ovatio by the Classical Association for the Middle West and South in 2008. Between 2013 and 2014 she served as the President for the Classical Association for the Middle West and South.

Cyrino's research is focused in two main areas: eros in Ancient Greece, and classical reception on the modern screen and pop culture. She has been described as 'an authority on the reception of ancient Rome in film studies', and her work on film has been described as "advancing the field of Classical Reception Studies". Cyrino has published on modern TV series such as HBO's Rome on both seasons, BBC's Troy: Fall of a City and Starz' Spartacus. She has also been described as a "leading academic" and "leading name in cinematic reception studies." Her work on film and TV has also meant that she has been involved in the media industries, as Cyrino has served as the historical consultant on TV series such as Better Call Saul (2015) and The Messengers (2015).

Cyrino has also received many awards for contributions to her field through teaching such as:

- American Philological Association's Excellence in Teaching Classics Award (1998-1999)
- UNM Alumni Association Faculty Teaching Award (2002)
- UNM Presidential Teaching Fellowship Award (2000-2002)
- UNM College of Arts & Sciences Gunter Starkey Teaching Award (1998-1999)
- UNM Outstanding Teacher of the Year Award (1994-1995)

Cyrino will deliver the 2025 Sir Ronald Syme Memorial Lecture at The Classics Programme of Te Herenga Waka (Victoria University of Wellington).

== Bibliography ==
- Screening Love and War in Troy: Fall of a City. Co-edited with Antony Augoustakis (Bloomsbury 2022).
- STARZ Spartacus: Reimagining an Icon on Screen. Co-edited with Antony Augoustakis (Edinburgh 2017).
- Rome, Season Two: Trial and Triumph ed. Monica S. Cyrino (Edinburgh 2015).
- Screening Love and Sex in the Ancient World ed. Monica S. Cyrino (Palgrave Macmillan 2013).
- Aphrodite (Routledge 2010).
- Rome, Season One: History Makes Television ed. Monica S. Cyrino (Blackwell 2008).
