= Richard Cheese =

American cover band

Richard Cheese & Lounge Against The Machine
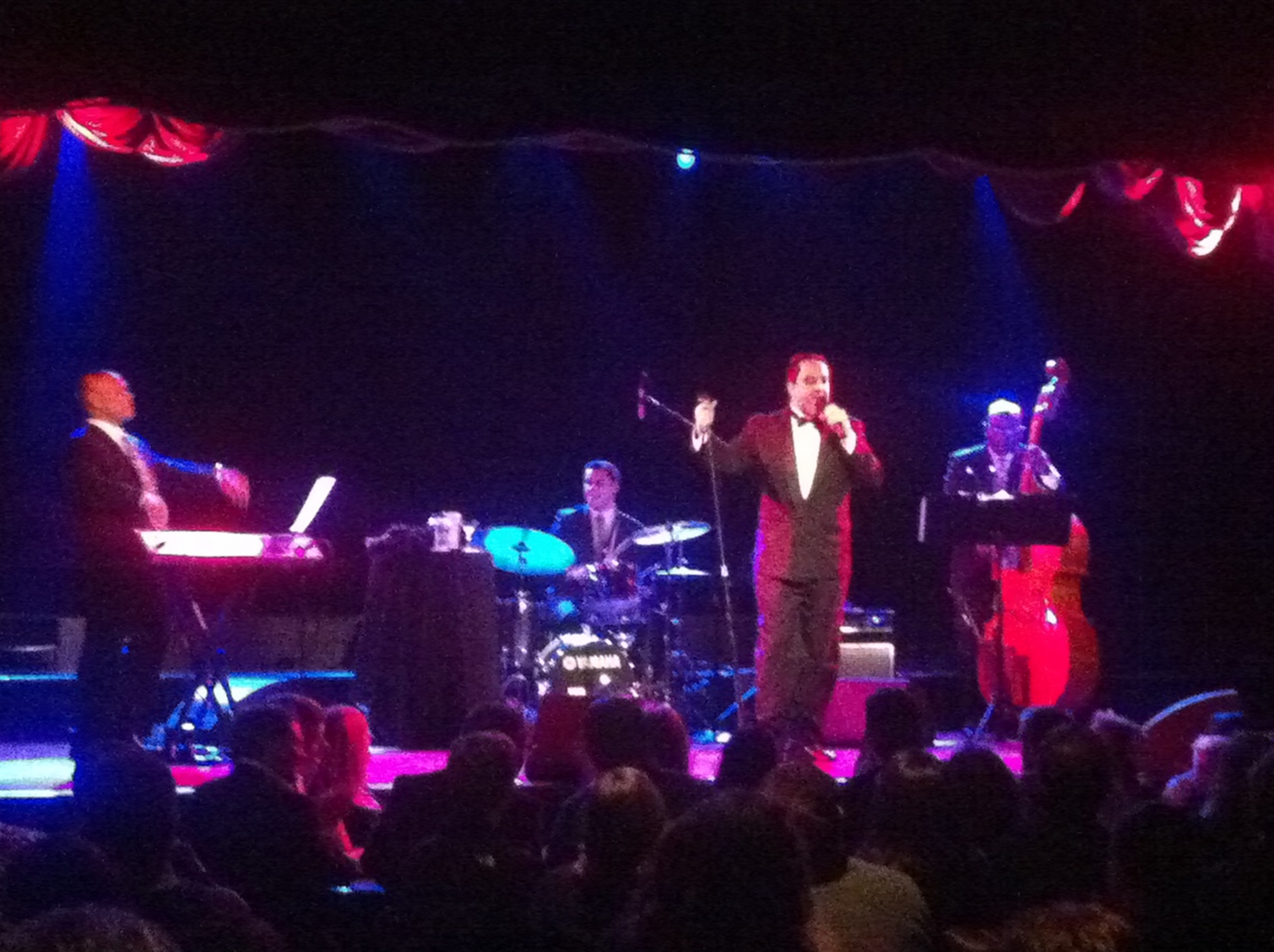
- Richard Cheese & Lounge Against The Machine performing live in 2011

Background information
- Origin: Los Angeles, California, U.S.
- Genres: Lounge; comedy; swing revival
- Years active: 2000–present
- Labels: Coverage Records (current), Surfdog, Oglio
- Members: Richard Cheese (Mark Jonathan Davis); Bobby Ricotta (Noel Melanio); Frank Feta (Brian Fishler); Billy Bleu (Ron Belcher)
- Website: richardcheese.com

Richard Cheese & Lounge Against The Machine (or simply Richard Cheese) is a cover band and comedy act, performing popular songs in a lounge/swing style. Lounge singer Richard Cheese is a character created and portrayed by Los Angeles–based actor/comedian/singer Mark Jonathan Davis.

== History ==
Davis had previously worked as Director of Comedy Network Programming for Premiere Networks. He developed the Richard Cheese lounge singer idea in the mid-1990s. The band's work was first broadcast in 2000 by KROQ-FM and the Dr. Demento show.

== Releases ==
Since 2000, Richard Cheese & Lounge Against The Machine band has released 28 albums.

The band's debut album Lounge Against the Machine was released in 2000 by Oglio Records. Cheese's second and third albums, Tuxicity and I'd Like a Virgin were independently released in 2002 and 2004 by Cheese's own label, Ideatown Entertainment (later renamed to Coverage Records). From 2005 to 2006, Surfdog Records released three Richard Cheese CDs: Aperitif for Destruction, a studio album, Silent Nightclub, a collection of songs tangentially related to the holiday season, and The Sunny Side of the Moon: The Best of Richard Cheese, which included newly re-recorded versions of six covers from previous albums, plus four new studio recordings. Surfdog also re-released the Richard Cheese albums Tuxicity and I'd Like a Virgin on their label.

Beginning in 2007, the band returned to releasing its own albums, through Davis's independent Coverage Records label.

== Film work ==
Richard Cheese's cover of Disturbed's "Down with the Sickness" was featured in the 2004 Zack Snyder-directed remake of Dawn of the Dead.

In 2016, the band had two songs in the motion picture Batman v Superman: Dawn of Justice, and released a one-track parody album called Live at Wayne Financial Tower in which the band's performance is cut short by Superman's heat vision. Warner Bros. included the band as animated LEGO mini-figs in the 2017 film The Lego Batman Movie.

The character of Richard Cheese appeared in the Kristen Wiig comedy Barb and Star Go to Vista Del Mar, released in February 2021.

In May 2021, Snyder's Army of the Dead movie featured Richard Cheese singing the opening song "Viva Las Vegas" in a duet with Allison Crowe.

== Band members ==
As of 2015, the lineup of the Lounge Against The Machine band was:

- Richard Cheese – vocals
- Bobby Ricotta – piano, keyboards
- Frank Feta – drums, percussion
- Billy Bleu – upright bass, bass

The names are all pseudonyms that refer to types of cheese (ricotta, feta, bleu).

The role of pianist and musical director Bobby Ricotta is currently played by Noel Melanio. The band's first drummer, Buddy Gouda, was played by Todd LaValley, and then by Charles Byler. Byler left the band in 2004; he was replaced by Brian Fishler, and the drummer's stage name was changed to Frank Feta. The current bass player, Billy Bleu, is portrayed by Ron Belcher.

== Discography ==
All self-released as Coverage Records except where noted.

=== Studio albums ===
- Lounge Against the Machine (2000) (Oglio Records)
- Tuxicity (2002) (Surfdog Records) (Note: originally released in 2002 by Ideatown/Coverage Records)
- I'd Like a Virgin (2004) (Surfdog Records) (Note: originally released in 2004 by Ideatown/Coverage Records)
- Aperitif for Destruction (2005) (Surfdog Records)
- The Sunny Side of the Moon: The Best of Richard Cheese (2006) (Surfdog Records)
- Silent Nightclub (2006) (Surfdog Records)
- Dick at Nite (2007)
- Viva la Vodka (2009)
- OK Bartender (2010)
- Lavapalooza (2010) (as Richard Cheese presents Johnny Aloha)
- Richard Cheese: Live at the Royal Wedding (2011)
- Cocktails with Santa
- A Lounge Supreme (2011)
- Back in Black Tie (2012)
- The Lounge Awakens (2015)
- Supermassive Black Tux (2015)
- Bakin' at the Boulder [Live at the Boulder Theater] (2015)
- Licensed to Spill (2017)
- The Royal Baby Album
- Richard Cheese's Big Swingin' Organ! (2019)
- Numbers of the Beast (2020)
- Big Cheese Energy (2021)
- Live From Hollywood (2023)
- Blue No Matter Who (2024)

=== Compilation albums ===
- The Sunny Side of the Moon: The Best of Richard Cheese (2006) (Surfdog Records)
- Hail to the Cheese: Richard Cheese's All-American Greatest Hits (digital only) (2012)
- Down With the Dickness: Richard Cheese's Dirtiest Greatest Hits (digital only) (2012)
- Lord of the Swings: The Best of Richard Cheese, Vol. 2 (digital only) (2018)
- Snappier Than Ever: The Original Songs (2021)
- Besame Queso (vinyl only) (2022)
- Pussy Party (vinyl only) (2022)
- Microphone Colossus: The Best of Richard Cheese, Vol. 3 (digital only) (2025)

=== Film soundtracks ===
- Dawn of the Dead “Down with the Sickness” (2004, Universal)
- Batman v Superman: Dawn of Justice “Night and Day”, first meeting of Bruce Wayne and Clark Kent (2016, Warner Bros.)
- The Lego Batman Movie: Original Motion Picture Soundtrack (2017, Warner Bros.)
- Barb and Star Go to Vista Del Mar Soundtrack (2021, Milan/Sony)
- Army of the Dead soundtrack (2021, Milan/Sony)

== Charts ==
- The Sunny Side of the Moon – No. 9 on Billboard Comedy Album Chart, March 17, 2006
- OK Bartender – No. 15 on Billboard Comedy Album Chart, April 9, 2010
- Numbers of the Beast – No. 6 on Billboard Comedy Album Chart, August 15, 2020
- Big Cheese Energy – No. 10 on Billboard Comedy Album Chart, March 13, 2021

== See also ==
- The Lounge Kittens, an English comedy band who performed rock and heavy metal songs in a lounge music style.
- Black Velvet Flag, an American trio who performed punk rock songs in a lounge music style.
- Frank Bennett, an Australian jazz singer who recorded several big band arrangements of popular songs.
