= Asian American hip-hop =

Musical genre

Asian American hip hop
- Stylistic origins: Hip hop
- Cultural origins: 1970s, the Bronx, New York City
- Typical instruments: Turntable, synthesizer, DAW, rapping, drum machine, sampler, drums, guitar, bass guitar, piano, beatboxing, vocals

The influence and impact of hip hop was originally shaped from African American communities in the South Bronx. In the last several decades, the abundant Asian and Asian American presence in hip hop has become a worldwide phenomenon and one factor of their exponential participation in hip hop culture can be credited to the emergence of collegiate California-based dance teams that propagated from the culture-centric/ethnic-centric clubs on campuses; in the mid 1980's to the late 1990's the first generation of collegiate teams had been inspired by dance films such as Breakin' (1983), Flashdance [Rocksteady Crew] (1983) and popular house party dances like Wop and the Running Man. The following generation of collegiate dance teams were further nurtured by the commercial successes of films like Save the Last Dance (2001), Honey (2003), You Got Served (2004), Step Up (2006), and Stomp The Yard (2007). Television shows such as So You Think You Can Dance (2005), America's Best Dance Crew (2008); and finally Internet video sharing websites such as YouTube (2005) facilitated greater exposure of hip hop dance culture to mass audiences, both domestic and international. Technological advancements and forms of communication and publishing have allowed the movement to become a worldwide phenomenon which transcends different cultural boundaries. Asian American hip-hop practitioners include: MC Jin, Lyrics Born, Dumbfoundead, Tokimonsta, and DJ Q-Bert.

== 1980s ==
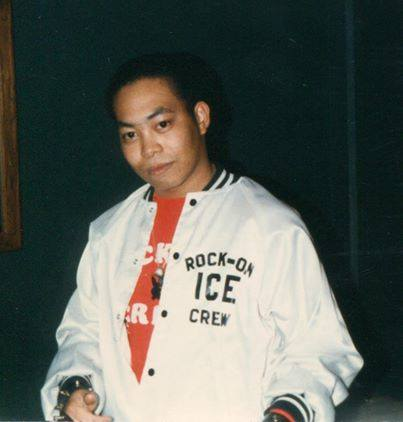
Fresh Kid Ice in the 1980s.

=== Fresh Kid Ice and 2 Live Crew ===
In 1984, three members of the U.S. Air Force, while stationed at March Air Force Base in Riverside, California, formed the rap group 2 Live Crew known to have popularized Miami Bass, a subgenre of hip hop music. This included the DJ David "Mr. Mixx" Hobbs, and two rappers Yuri "Amazing Vee" Vielot, and Christopher Fresh Kid Ice Wong Won (1964–2017). Wong Won would become known as the first Asian rapper, his ethnicity is Afrochinese, his family is mostly from Hong Kong and both of his grandmothers were African. In many of his raps, he gave himself the nickname Chinaman.

After releasing a successful independent single, the group caught the attention of a Florida-based music promoter and DJ named Luther Campbell invited the group to work with him there. Vielot would quit the group shortly after. They then released the lyrically sexually charged single called "Throw The D" in January 1986 gave a permanent blueprint to how future Miami bass songs were written and produced. At the time Fresh Kid Ice was the only MC in the group and featured on the track. The fact that he was alone made him the first Miami Bass Rapper. It is rumored that he coined the term Miami Bass as well. Shortly after, Campbell would join the group as the hype man and Brother Marquis took over Amazing Vee's place.

The 2 Live Crew's debut album The 2 Live Crew Is What We Are (1986), and their second Move Somethin' (1988) both went Gold and were comedic albums with sexually explicit lyrics. Fresh Kid Ice and his group mate became American rap superstars of that area.

The group became notorious, influential, and legendary in 1989 with their third album As Nasty As They Wanna Be, along with its hit single "Me So Horny", proved more controversial still, leading to legal troubles getting obscenity charges for both 2 Live Crew and retailers selling the album (all charges were eventually overturned on appeal in the 1990s). The controversy lead to the album going double platinum.Fresh Kid Ice, would make two more best selling albums with 2 Live Crew before disbanding in 1991. In 1992, he made his first solo album The Chinaman. The Chinaman is the first American hip hop album to embrace an Asian heritage. It inverts Asian stereotypes into prideful declarations of self-identity. On the Billboard 200, it peaked at No. 38 and stayed two weeks on the Heatseekers Albums, and was No. 56 for ten weeks on the Top R&B/Hip-Hop Albums. Various reunions of the 2 Live Crew would occur. All the albums produced from that point would chart, but all them would have one or two members of the original line up missing, however Fresh Kid Ice was the only one always present until the last official 2 Live Crew album The Real One in 1998.

In the early 2000s Fresh Kid Ice released three albums: Still Nasty (2000), Stop Playin' (2003), and Freaky Chinese (2004). Due to the graphic sexual nature of his lyrics, his music video could only be played on BET Uncut. Freaky Chinese is noted to be the first album where Flo Rida performed, whom he discovered and hired on to be his hypeman.

In the mid 2000s Fresh Kid Ice and Brother Marquis decided to relaunch 2 Live Crew. They toured and released singles. Fresh Kid ice left 2 Live Crew in 2016, and died in 2017 due to health issues.

== 1990s ==
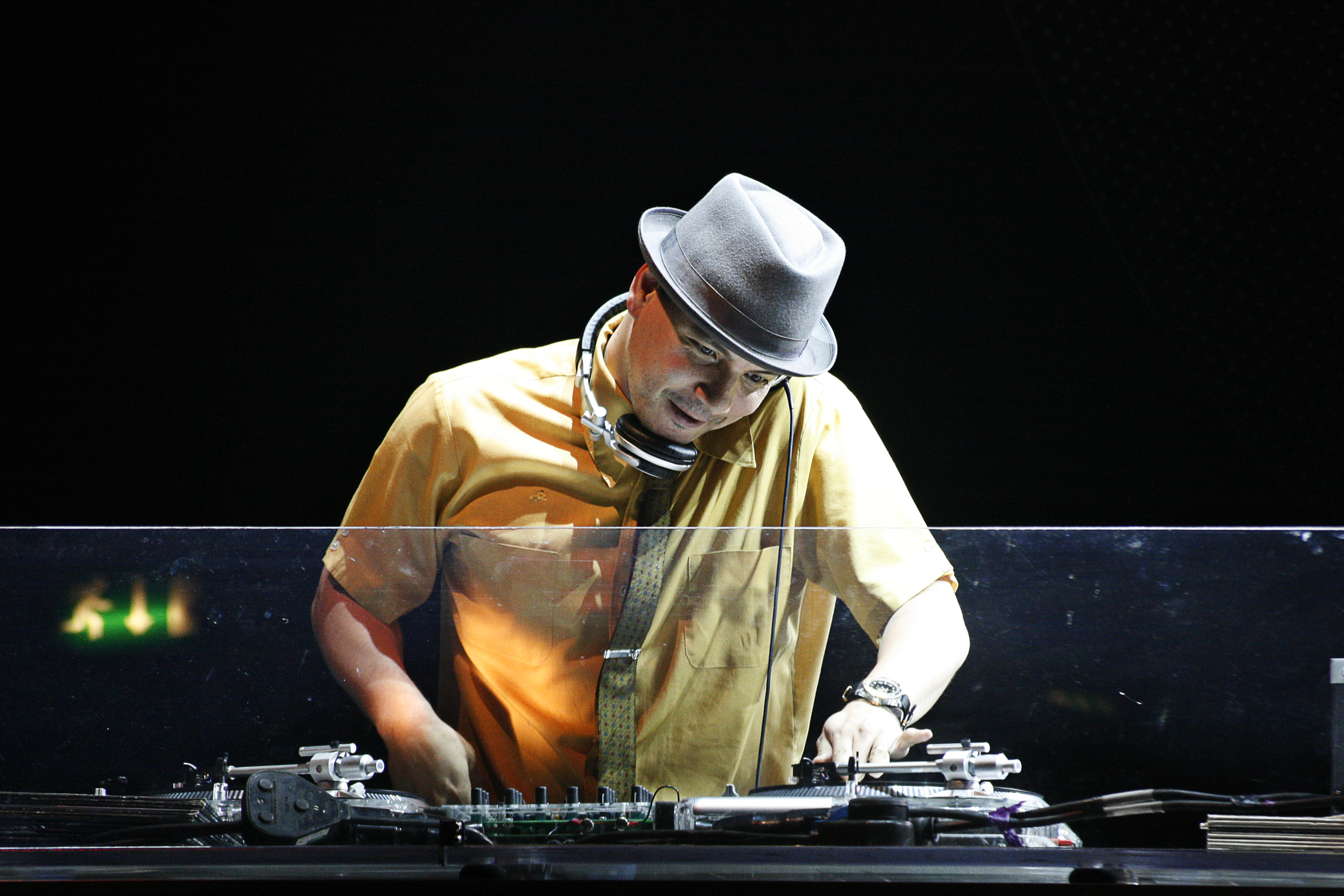
Mix Master Mike circa 2007

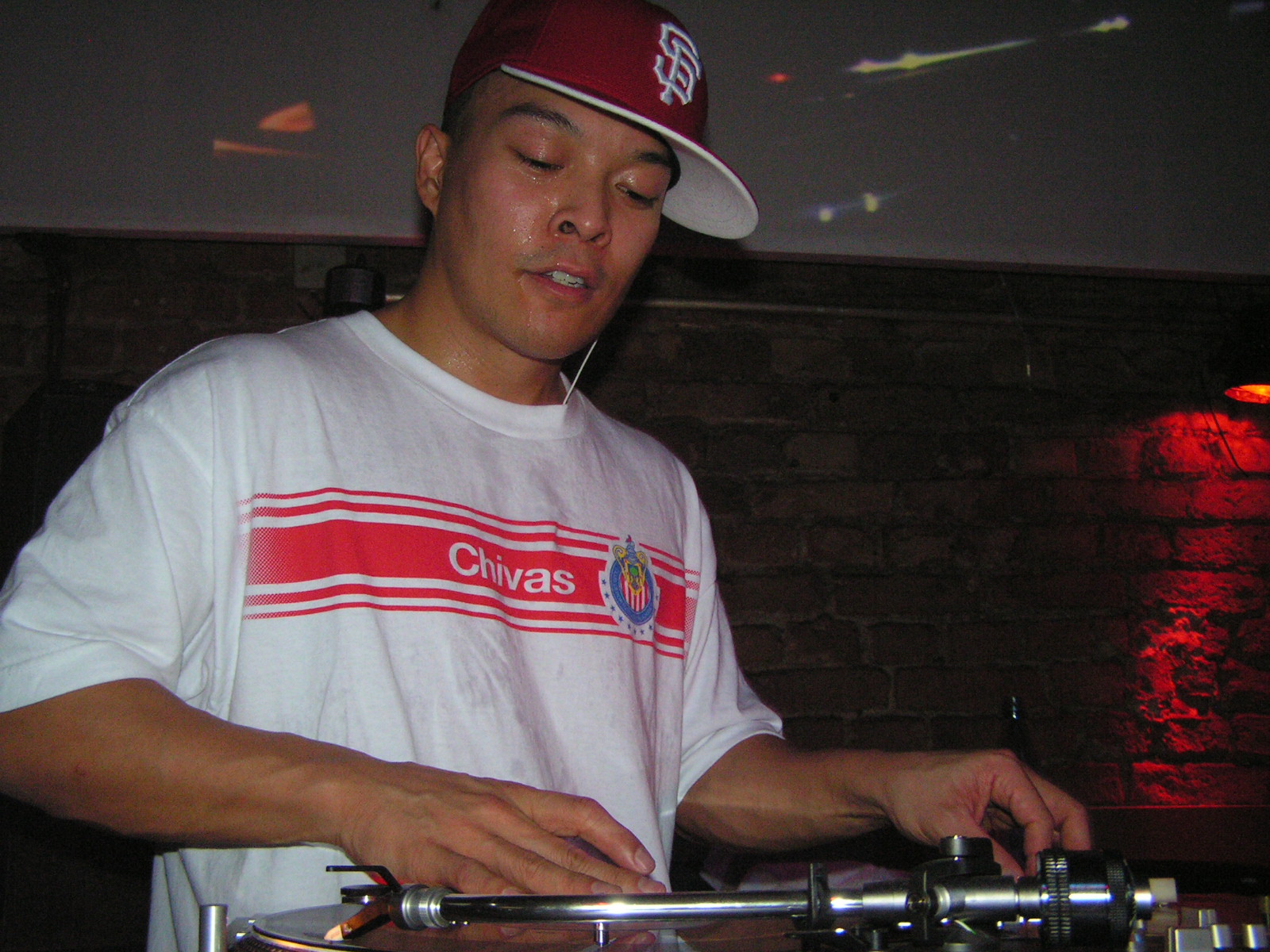
DJ Qbert circa 2008

=== DJ Qbert and Mix Master Mike of Invisibl Skratch Piklz ===
In the early 1990s, two hip hop turntablists of Filipino descent came to prominence DJ Qbert, Mix Master Mike, they were both founding members of the group Invisibl Skratch Piklz. In 1990, DJ Qbert won the DMC World DJ Championships, the following year he was joined by his group Shadow of the Prophet (later known as Invisibl Skratch Piklz) which included Mix Master Mike. Together they won for three more consecutive years.

They released as a group and solo many Albums, Mixtapes and various other projects. Through these, they are known for the inventions of the "crab scratch", "tweak scratch", "strobing", and furthering the development of "flare scratching".

Mix Master Mike's most high-profile work has been with hip-hop group the Beastie Boys. Mix Master Mike worked with the band on Hello Nasty (1998), and To The 5 Boroughs(2004). In 2018, it was announced by BReal of Cypress Hill that he would be joining Cypress Hill.

=== apl.de.ap of The Black Eyed Peas ===
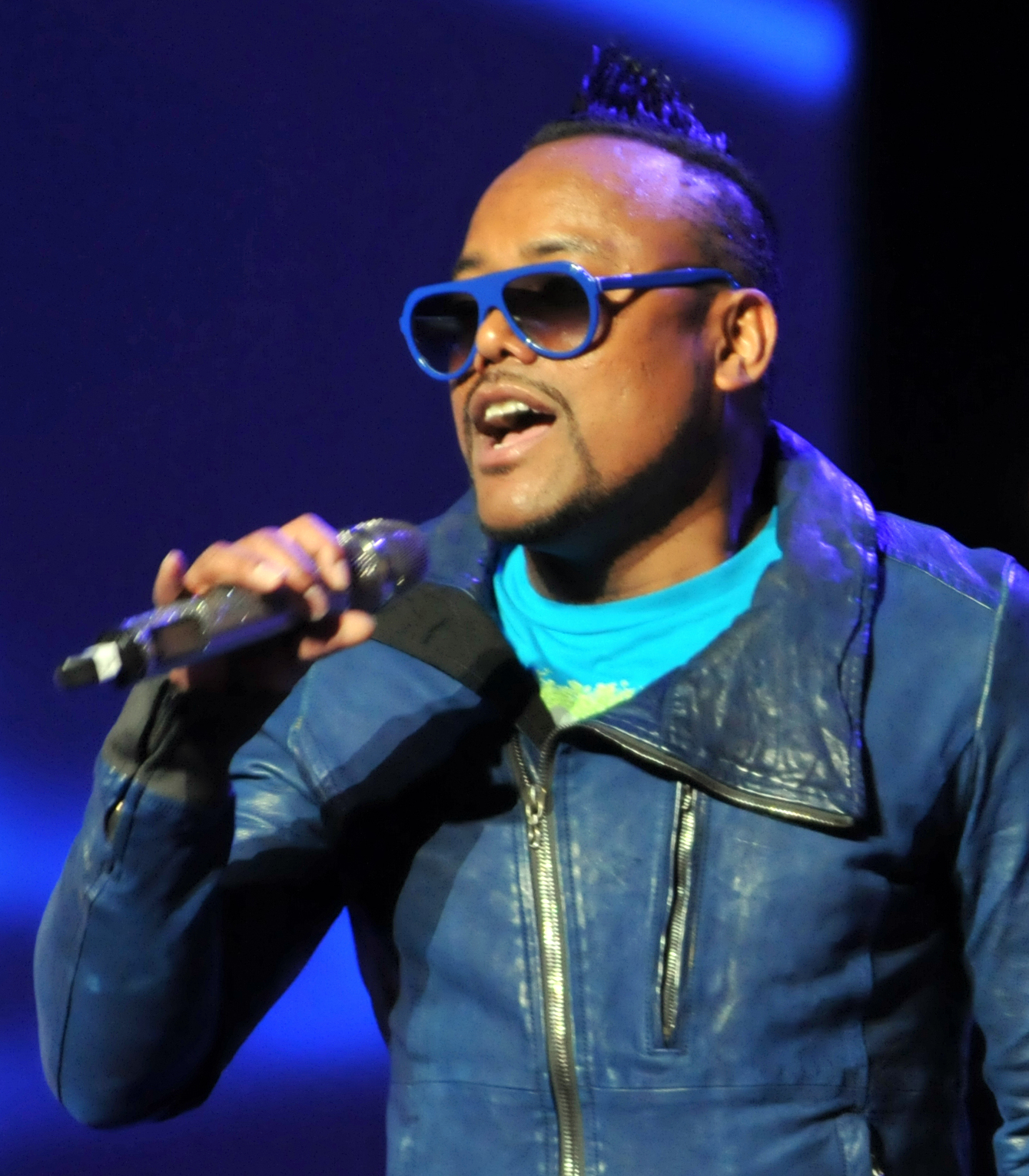
apl.de.ap performing in 2011.

In 1992, apl.de.ap a Filipino descent rapper, with his group mate will.i.am, and several others had their group Atban Klann sign to Ruthless Records (run by Eazy-E). They made their first appearance on Eazy-E's EP, 5150: Home 4 tha Sick on the track entitled "Merry Muthaphuckkin' Xmas". Soon after, the duo recorded their debut album, Grass Roots which was to be released on October 6, 1992; however, the album was shelved shortly before its release. The duo would stay with Ruthless until they were dropped from the label after Eazy-E's death in 1995. Soon after they changed their name to Black Eyed Peas. Another vocalist would join Taboo, and they made their critically acclaimed debut Behind the Front.

In 2000, apl.de.ap and The Black Eyed Peas released Bridging the Gap, who met with critical acclaim.

For their third album in 2003, female singer Fergie joined and they made Elephunk. In the United States, Elephunk reached number 14 on the Billboard Top 200 and was their first album to chart in the top 15. On the UK Album Charts it reached number 3. It has sold over 1.6 million copies in the UK and 8.5 million copies worldwide.

In 2004, their album Monkey Business was also a big success. Afterward the group went on a hiatus. They came back in with the album 2009 The E.N.D., and 2010 The Beginning. Both albums did well on the charts.

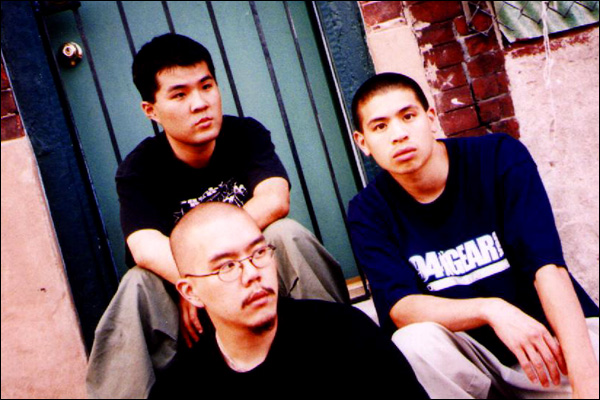
Mountain Brothers promotional photo.

=== Mountain Brothers ===
Philadelphia's Mountain Brothers emerged from the underground rap scene and are considered cultural pioneers, being one of the first Asian American hip-hop groups with an authentic style and also for the lack of sampling of other music in construction of their own. The Mountain Brothers were briefly signed to Ruffhouse Records, a major record label, in 1997 but did not publish an album under the record label. In the following year, 1998, the group released their debut album Self, Vol. 1, through their own independent record label. Mountain Brothers released two critically acclaimed albums, Self Vol 1(1999) and Triple Crown(2003), the first of which is widely considered to be an independent hip-hop classic. The Mountain Brothers' music video for their song, Galaxies was broadcast on MTV, making the rap group one of the first Asian American artists to do so.

== 2000s ==
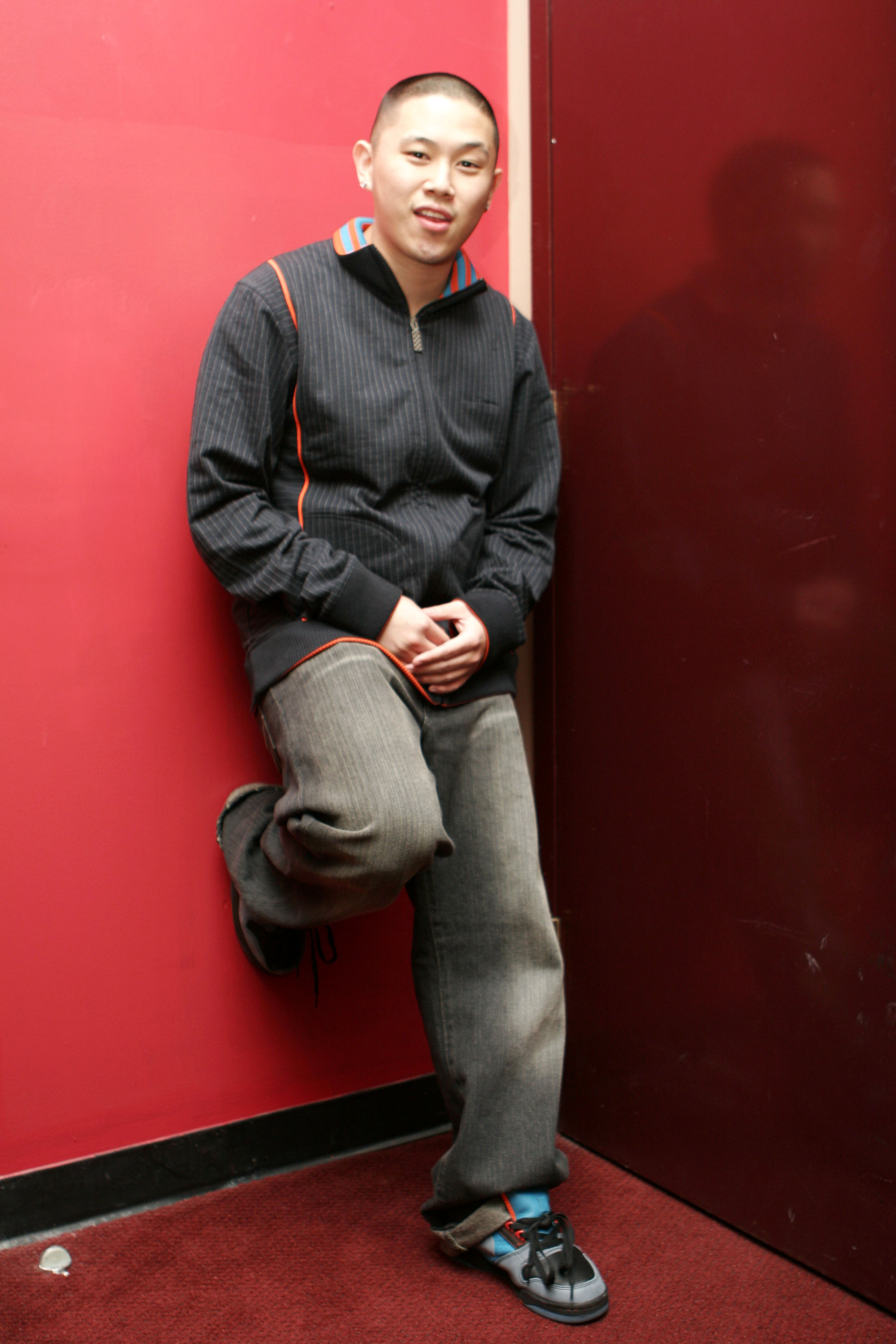
MC Jin circa 2004.

=== MC Jin ===
In 2001, MC Jin had a break came when the BET program 106 & Park began inviting local rappers to hold battles in a segment known as Freestyle Friday. He won seven battles in a row, making Jin the second battle rapper in B.E.T history to have completed this feat, enabling Jin to be inducted in the Freestyle Friday Hall of Fame. Unlike other competitors, Jin occasionally spoke Cantonese in his freestyle verses.

After that he signed a deal with the Ruff Ryders label. His first single under Ruff Ryders was titled "Learn Chinese" featuring Wyclef Jean. The album The Rest Is History debuted at the No. 54 on the Billboard 200 and spent 3 weeks on the charts debuting at No. 54. The album also spent 7-week on the Billboard Top R&B/Hip-Hop Albums debuting at No. 12. It also spent two weeks at the Billboard Top Rap Albums debuting at No. 8. The album to date has sold over 100,000 units in the United States and over 250,000 worldwide.

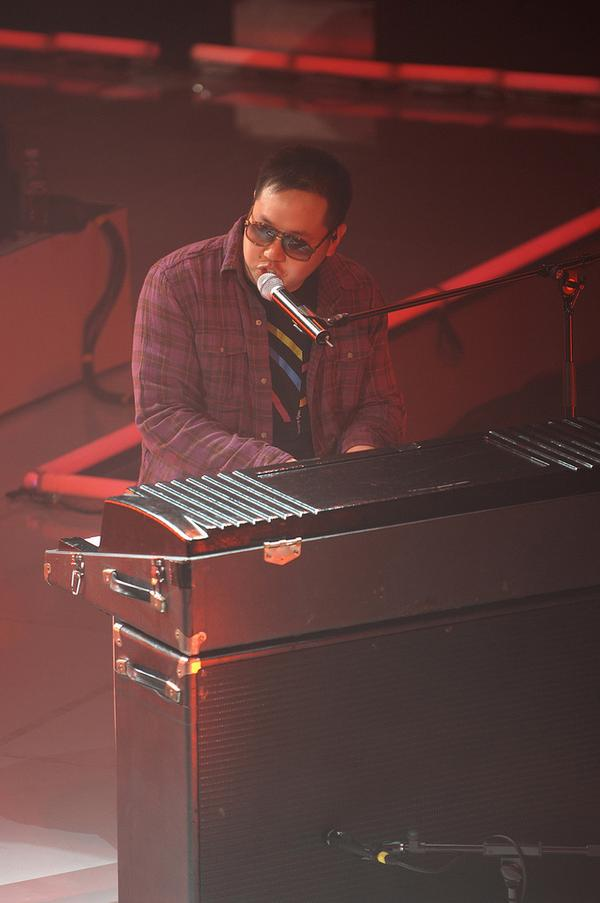
Kero One performing circa 2009.

=== Kero One ===
Kero One is a Korean-American hip hop MC, producer, and DJ from San Francisco, California. He has been recognized for re-introducing the jazz rap sound in the early to mid 2000s with his groundbreaking jazz-hop album Windmills of the Soul.

== 2010s ==
Ever since many Asian rappers have emerged in the US, including Traphik, Jay Park, Dumbfoundead, Heems, Anderson .Paak, Awkwafina, and Rich Brian.

Far East Movement became the first Asian American hip hop act to attain mainstream success with their single "Like a G6" in 2010. Eric Nakamura of Giant Robot likens the group's success to Jeremy Lin signing with the Golden State Warriors, becoming the first Asian-American to sign with the NBA since 1947.

Model Minority, a hip hop trio consisting of The Fung Brothers and Jason “Grandmaster” Chu, released a parody rap of Wiz Khalifa's "Black and Yellow" in 2011.
