= Ddotty =

South Korean YouTuber (born 1986)

Dotty
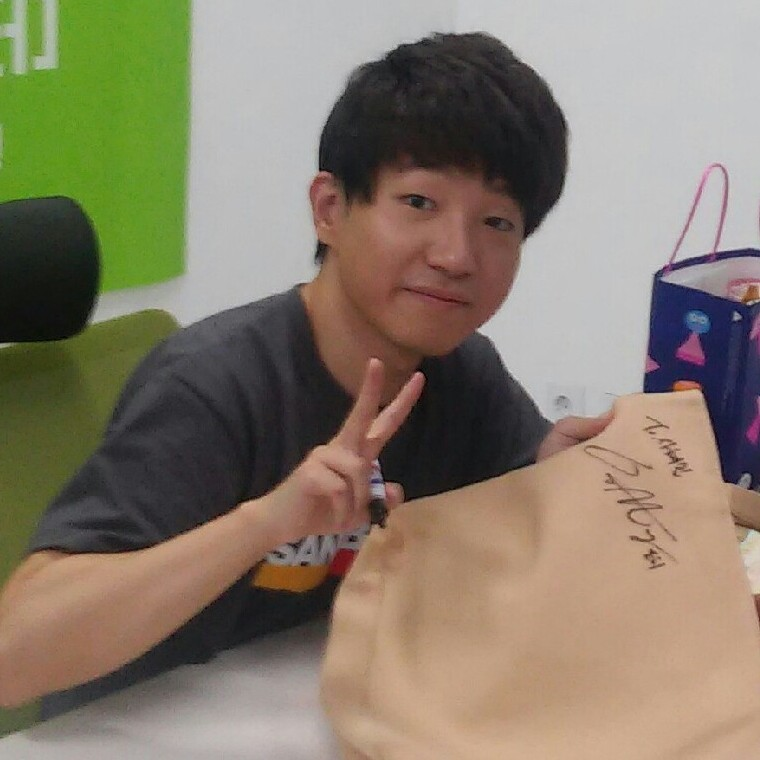
- Na in 2016
- Born: Na Hee-sun; 10 December 1986 (age 39); Cheongju, South Korea
- Occupations: YouTuber, businessman
- Organization: Sandbox Network

YouTube information
- Channel: Dotty
- Years active: 2013–present
- Genres: Gaming; Role-playing
- Subscribers: 2.37 million
- Views: 2.8 billion
- Last updated: September 21, 2025

Na Hee-sun (Korean: 나희선; born 10 December 1986), also known by his online alias Ddotty, (도티TV, also spelled as "Dotty") is a South Korean YouTuber, internet personality and businessman. He is the current president and co-founder of Sandbox Network. Na gained fame as an internet celebrity among young audiences through his child-friendly content, which focused mostly on the video game Minecraft.

== Life and career ==
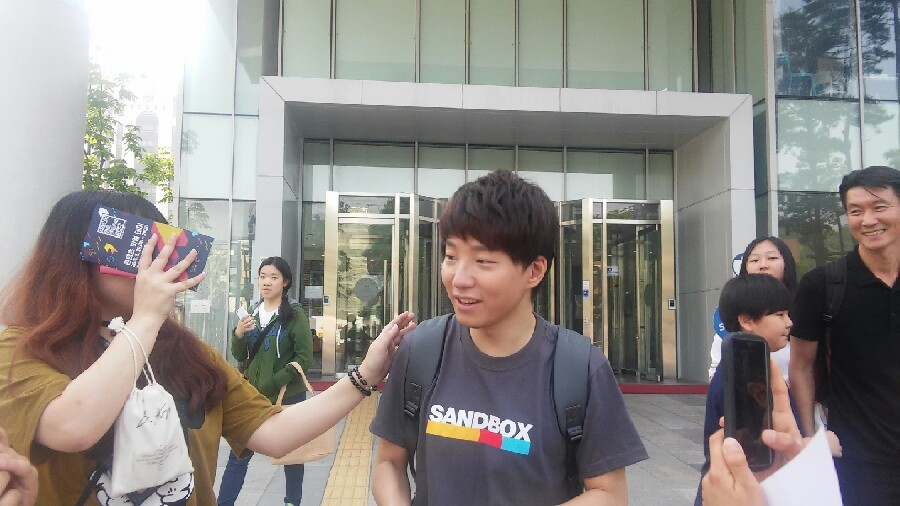
Na during a 2016 fan convention

Na was born in Cheongju, North Chungcheong Province, on 10 December 1986. After graduating from Pungsaeng High School, he earned a bachelor's degree in law in Yonsei University to pursue a law career. In an interview with The Dong-A Ilbo, Na recounted that he felt burdened with the costs of Law school and later became interested in becoming a production designer for a broadcasting company. When the success of South Korean singer Psy's "Gangnam Style" on YouTube brought the video-sharing platform into recognition among Korean audiences, Na became interested and conceived a YouTube channel with "around 1000 subscribers" on his resume would help him better pursue a career in TV production. He uploaded his first video on 16 October 2013, which was a playthrough of the video game Minecraft.

In 2014, Na visited the US to attend that year's VidCon, with Lee Pil-sung, a friend of his who was then a Google employee. Subsequently, the two founded Sandbox Network, a multi-channel network (MCN), in 2015, with Na as the CCO and Lee as the CEO.

Na gained popularity through his kid-orientated content, focusing mostly on playthroughs or role-playing web series on various online video games such as Minecraft, Roblox, and Clash Royale. He has made appearances in various South Korean TV shows including Radio Star, Omniscient Interfering View, and Happy Together. His immense fame among young viewers gave him the nickname "Elementary School President" (Korean: 초통령).

== Reception ==
Na became involved with the 2020 Korean YouTube backdoor advertising controversy when several YouTubers associated with Sandbox Network were revealed to have published videos with advertised content without labeling their videos with tags disclosing paid promotions. On 7 August, Sandbxox Network revealed a statement of apology acknowledging the company's responsibility.

On 2 May 2024, Na was prosecuted by KORAIL for trespassing when he posted a video of himself inside an operational railroad in Yongsan District, Seoul, on Instagram. The video was later taken down, and Sandbox Network released a statement of apology, elaborating that the railroad was mistaken as defunct.

== Filmography ==
TV Shows
| Year | Broadcast | Show | Role | Remarks |
|---|---|---|---|---|
| 2019 | MBC | King of Mask Singer | Contestant (Short-Lived Resolve) | |
| 2019 | Tooniverse | My YouTube Diary | Himself | |
| 2019 | MBC | Omniscient Interfering View | Guest | |
| 2020 | Animax Korea | DDottyui Banggwahu Ranking | Host | |
| 2020 | MBC | Those Who Cross the Line | Guest | |
| 2020 | tvN | Problematic Men | Regular guest | |
| 2020 | MBC | Video Star | Guest | |
| 2020 | KBS | Gag Concert | Guest | |
| 2020 | JTBC | Travelling Market | Seller | |
| 2020 | MBN | Voice Trot | Contestant | |
| 2020 | KBS | Boss in the Mirror | Special guest | Met with Hyun Joo-yup at Sandbox Network's headquarters |
| 2020 | Tooniverse | My YouTube Diary 2 | Himself | |
| 2021 | SBS | Racket Boys | | Special appearance |
| 2022 | Tooniverse | Dasi Mannan Segye: Jjeomimun | Himself | Special appearance |
| 2022 | Mnet | Show Me the Money 11 | Contestant | |

Movies
| Year | Title | Role |
|---|---|---|
| 2023 | Dotty and the Tower of Eternity | Himself |
