= Problematic Men =

- Promotional poster
- Also known as: The Brainiacs
- Genre: Talkshow; Variety
- Starring: See below
- Country of origin: South Korea
- Original language: Korean
- No. of seasons: 3
- No. of episodes: 224

Production
- Production location: South Korea
- Running time: 75 minutes
- Production company: tvN

Original release
- Network: tvN
- Release: February 26, 2015 – February 13, 2020

Problematic Men (Korean: 문제적남자) was a South Korean television program that aired on tvN.

The program went on hiatus after its broadcast on March 25, 2018. On May 9, 2018, it was announced that the program would be returning as Season 2 from May 29, and would air on every Tuesday at 23:00 (KST), with no change in the current cast lineup. Beginning January 7, 2019 the program aired on Mondays at 23:00 (KST).

The program was on another hiatus after its broadcast on June 10, 2019, as the program was to be replaced by More Salty Tour in its time slot, and it was slated to return in the second half of 2019. On October 28, 2019, tvN confirmed the program would return as Season 3 starting November 21, 2019, with original cast members Tyler Rasch and Park Kyung (Block B) not returning. Plus, model Joo Woo-jae and YouTuber/entrepreneur Ddotty would join the cast as new members.

The program had an indefinite hiatus as of February 13, 2020, due to the COVID-19 pandemic in South Korea, which made filming of the program difficult. No update about the show was announced, indicating that the series has ended.

A reboot of the program called Problematic Men Reboot: Math Edition starring Jun Hyun-moo, Chung Seung-je, John Park, Suho, Bae Sung-jae and Kim Gyu-min, aired on June 23 and 30, 2025.

== Program ==
It is a talk show variety program that focuses on various types of problems every week, sometimes with a theme. The cast invited for this program are 6 males, that have been labelled as "men with hot brains".

Traditionally, the cast is given clues to guess the identity of the episode's guest(s), and once the guest appears and are introduced, they and the cast are given a set of problems to solve. It is a tradition that all problems for the episode must be solved before the whole recording of the episode would end.

Season 3 features the theme of Brain Wanderers Squad/Travelling Brainiacs (브레인 유랑단), where the cast goes outdoors, unlike most of the previous 2 seasons when they were in the studio. The 6 cast members travel to various places around South Korea, varying from campuses to companies. For each place, the members would be split into 2 teams of 3 to look for people who they think are hidden brainiacs in the place and each team selects one to join, and the 2 teams go against each other in a battle of problem solving. The winning team can get off work on time, while the losing team has to stay in the campus to study after filming for the show is complete.

== Airtime ==
Air date	Airtime
Season 1
February 26 – July 16, 2015	Thursdays at 11:00 PM KST
August 16, 2015 – March 25, 2018	Sundays at 10:30 PM KST
Season 2
May 29, 2018 – January 1, 2019	Tuesdays at 11:00 PM KST
January 7 – June 10, 2019	Mondays at 11:00 PM KST
Season 3
November 21, 2019 – February 13, 2020	Thursdays at 8:00 PM KST

== Cast ==
- Jun Hyun-moo (Ep 1–224)
- Kim Ji-seok (Ep 1–224; absent in episodes 174, 179–198)
- Lee Jang-won (Peppertones) (Ep 1–224; absent in episodes 135, 174)
- Tyler Rasch (Ep 1–211; absent in episodes 37–39, 56, 72, 145–148, 163–164, 174)
- Ha Seok-jin (Ep 1–224; absent in episode 174)
- RM (BTS) (Ep 1-21)
- Park Kyung (Block B) (Ep 25-211; absent in episodes 37–39, 77, 145, 149, 174, 205)
- Joo Woo-jae (Ep 212–224)
- Ddotty (Ep 212–224)

== Episodes ==
In the ratings below, for each year, the highest rating for the show will be in red, and the lowest rating for the show will be in blue.

=== 2015 ===
List of 2015 episodes (episode 1-41)

Episode #	Broadcast Date	Guest	Ratings (AGB Nielsen Korea)
1	February 26, 2015	-	2.374%
2	March 5, 2015	-	1.834%
3	March 12, 2015	Lee Won-suk	1.633%
4	March 19, 2015	-	1.425%
5	March 26, 2015	-	1.838%
6	April 2, 2015	-	1.745%
7	April 9, 2015	-	1.978%
8	April 16, 2015	-	1.750%
9	April 23, 2015	Jackson (GOT7)	1.663%
10	April 30, 2015	Suho (EXO)	1.733%
11	May 7, 2015	Suho (EXO)	1.492%
12	May 14, 2015	Kim Ban-seok (elder brother of Kim Ji-seok, graduate of University of Oxford)	2.023%
13	May 21, 2015	Kim Young-chul	1.729%
14	May 28, 2015	Han Seung-yeon (KARA)	1.465%
15	June 4, 2015	-	1.426%
16	June 11, 2015	Lee Ki-woo	1.437%
17	June 18, 2015	Ha Sang-wook (Author)	1.496%
18	June 25, 2015	Shin Jae Pyung	1.908%
19	July 2, 2015	Pyo Chang-won	1.888%
20	July 9, 2015	-	2.027%
21	July 16, 2015	Yang Se-hyung; Lee Jin-ho	1.790%
22	August 16, 2015	Shin Jae Pyung	1.568%
23	August 23, 2015	Kim Chong-woon (Principal of a creative development institute, starter of Korea's pictorial brain warm-ups); Lee Chi-sung (Well known comic strips author, under the pseudonym CHO); Shin Jae Pyung	1.872%
24	August 30, 2015	Song Ki-moon (CTO of a game company); Shin Jae Pyung	1.783%
25	September 6, 2015	-	2.311%
26	September 13, 2015	-	1.902%
27	September 20, 2015	Dennis Hong	1.951%
28	September 27, 2015	-	1.632%
29	October 4, 2015	Lee Eun-gyeol	1.796%
30	October 11, 2015	Jang Dong-min, Hong Jin-ho	2.217%
31	October 18, 2015	Kim Hyung-kyu (Dentist, broadcaster)	2.163%
32	October 25, 2015	Yoonhan	1.846%
33	November 1, 2015	Yoon So-hee	2.508%
34	November 8, 2015	Jang Jin	2.119%
35	November 15, 2015	Sung Jin-hwan, In Ho-jin (Sweet Sorrow)	2.349%
36	November 22, 2015	Hwang Jae Keun (designer)	2.045%
37	November 29, 2015	Shin Jae Pyung, Key (SHINee)	2.157%
38	December 6, 2015	Shin Jae Pyung, Key (SHINee)	1.696%
39	December 13, 2015	Shin Jae Pyung, Key (SHINee)	1.547%
40	December 20, 2015	Ji Joo-yeon (Actress, achieved Bachelor in Media Informatics at from Seoul National University)	2.892%
41	December 27, 2015	Lee Jun-seok	2.522%

=== 2016 ===
List of 2016 episodes (episode 42–92)

Episode #	Broadcast Date	Guest	Ratings (AGB Nielsen Korea)
42	January 3, 2016	Go Joo-won	2.808%
43	January 10, 2016	Yoo Jae-hwan (Music producer)	2.463%
44	January 17, 2016	Lee Seung-won (Violist)	2.863%
45	January 24, 2016	Oh Sang-jin	3.236%
46	January 31, 2016	Choi Chang-yub (actor)	2.720%
47	February 7, 2016	Kim Sook, Kim Young-hee, Kim Min-kyung, Lee Se-young	2.309%
48	February 14, 2016	Kim Sook, Kim Young-hee, Kim Min-kyung, Lee Se-young	2.934%
49	February 21, 2016	Kim Young-woo, Song Woo-jin (Sweet Sorrow)	2.704%
50	February 28, 2016	Special appearance by Laboum	2.431%
51	March 6, 2016	Yoo Jae-Myung	1.913%
52	March 13, 2016	Lee Tae-min (SHINee)	1.646%
53	March 20, 2016	Chloë Grace Moretz	2.488%
54	March 27, 2016	Kyuhyun (Super Junior)	2.047%
55	April 3, 2016	Sam Hammington, Sam Okyere	2.308%
56	April 10, 2016	Nop.K (musician)	1.574%
57	April 17, 2016	Lee Won-suk (Daybreak)	1.739%
58	April 24, 2016	Block B	2.424%
59	May 1, 2016	Block B	1.400%
60	May 8, 2016	eAeon (Mot)	1.748%
61	May 15, 2016	Sa Hye-won (sophomore student at the University of Oxford)	2.782%
62	May 22, 2016	Cho Tae-kwan (actor)	2.095%
63	May 29, 2016	Park So-jin (Girl's Day)	2.212%
64	June 5, 2016	Dr. Simpson (rapper)	2.274%
65	June 12, 2016	Yang Se-chan, Lee Yong-jin	2.440%
66	June 19, 2016	Joo Woo-jae (model)	2.575%
67	June 26, 2016	Tony An	2.733%
68	July 3, 2016	JaePyung Shin (Peppertones), Song Ki-mun, Joo Woo-jae, Sung Jin-hwan (Sweet Sorrow), Jang Dong-min, Special appearance by Lovelyz on episode 69	1.872%
69	July 10, 2016	JaePyung Shin (Peppertones), Song Ki-mun, Joo Woo-jae, Sung Jin-hwan (Sweet Sorrow), Jang Dong-min, Special appearance by Lovelyz on episode 69	2.175%
70	July 17, 2016	Kwon Sun-il (Urban Zakapa)	2.849%
71	July 24, 2016	Kim Nam-hee (sports announcer, 2014 Miss Korea contestant, Mensa International member)	2.204%
72	July 31, 2016	Roy Kim, Joo Woo Jae	3.097%
73	August 7, 2016	Ko Na-young, Seo Yu-ri (student), Jung Min-gun	2.591%
74	August 14, 2016	Ko Na-young, Seo Yu-ri (student), Jung Min-gun	1.943%
74	August 14, 2016	Dominic O'Brien, Joo Woo-jae (standing in for Park Kyung)	1.943%
75	August 21, 2016	Dominic O'Brien, Joo Woo-jae (standing in for Park Kyung)	1.733%
76	August 28, 2016	John Park	2.450%
77	September 4, 2016	Wendy (Red Velvet), Joo Woo-jae (standing in for Park Kyung)	2.236%
78	September 11, 2016	Jun. K (2PM)	1.734%
79	September 18, 2016	Lee Soo-geun	2.118%
80	September 25, 2016	Choi Jung-moon	2.684%
81	October 2, 2016	Kim Ji-woon (chef, graduate of Eton College)	2.819%
82	October 16, 2016	Choi Min-ho (Shinee)	1.969%
83	October 23, 2016	Yoon Duk-won (Broccoli You Too)	2.250%
84	October 30, 2016	Jung Ha-eun, Jung Ji-woong (children of Jung Eun-pyo)	2.710%
85	November 6, 2016	Goo Sae-bom (announcer), Goo Se-kyung (sisters)	1.897%
86	November 13, 2016	Cha Eun-woo (ASTRO)	1.878%
87	November 20, 2016	Lee Jong-beom (webcomic artist)	1.777%
88	November 27, 2016	J-Min	2.103%
89	December 4, 2016	Yellow Bench (music duo)	2.696%
90	December 11, 2016	Park Sae-him (elder sister of Block B Park Kyung)	2.447%
91	December 18, 2016	myunDo (rapper)	1.940%
92	December 25, 2016	Park Na-rae, Kim Ji-min, Ahn Young-mi, Kang Yoo-mi, Oh Nami, Heo Anna	2.406%

=== 2017 ===
List of 2017 episodes (episode 93-144)

Episode #	Broadcast Date	Guest	Ratings (AGB Nielsen Korea)
93	January 1, 2017	Park Na-rae, Kim Ji-min, Ahn Young-mi, Kang Yoo-mi, Oh Nami, Heo Anna	2.629%
94	January 8, 2017	Kim Jeong-hoon	4.006%
95	January 15, 2017	Kim Jae-kyung, Lee Young-rae (SAT 2017 full marks candidates) (Special voice appearance by Jeon So-mi)	3.135%
96	January 22, 2017	Yong Duk Jhun (Digital cinematographer working at DreamWorks Animation)	3.016%
97	January 29, 2017	Seo Bo-hyun (Harvard University student, 2 time world debating champion)	3.142%
98	February 5, 2017	Choi Jeong, Oh Jeong-ah (Go players)	3.648%
99	February 12, 2017	Oh Min-suk	2.148%
100	February 19, 2017	100th Episode Special (Part 1); Special appearance by Cosmic Girls	3.406%
101	February 26, 2017	100th Episode Special (Part 2)	3.097%
102	March 5, 2017	Song Jae-kyeong (vocal of indie band 9 and the Numbers, chief of strategic planning department of one of the top construction companies in Korea)	2.412%
103	March 12, 2017	Kangnam	2.499%
104	March 19, 2017	Kim Dong-hyeok (Civil servant), Joo Woo-jae (stand-in for Park Kyung)	2.336%
105	March 26, 2017	Stella Jang (Singer-songwriter, graduate of Agro ParisTech, a Grandes école, majoring in Life Engineering), Shin Jae-pyung (stand-in for Park Kyung)	2.433%
106	April 2, 2017	Lisa (singer, musical actress), Lee Kyu-chang (CEO of Kin033 Entertainment, graduate of Washington University in St. Louis, majoring in business) (both are married to each other)	2.103%
107	April 9, 2017	Won Jong-gun (appeared on MBC's Exclamation Mark - Open Your Eyes in 2005; currently graduated from Kyung Hee University, majoring in Information and Communication; also the recipient of 2016 Korea's Talent award)	2.268%
108	April 16, 2017	Lee Su-ryeon (actress, former security agent in Presidential Security Service, achieved Masters in International Security Studies at Yonsei University and Bachelor in English Literature at Ewha Womans University)	2.639%
109	April 23, 2017	Seo Kyung-seok	2.005%
110	April 30, 2017	Kang Min-gil, Jung Won-ho, Kim Young-jong, Hong Hyuk-pyo, Ryu Chan-young, Han Kyu-beom (KAIST Special)	2.769%
111	May 7, 2017	Kang Min-gil, Jung Won-ho, Kim Young-jong, Hong Hyuk-pyo, Ryu Chan-young, Han Kyu-beom (KAIST Special)	1.921%
112	May 14, 2017	Han Jun-hee (Software engineer at Google, achieved Bachelor of Science, software engineering at Sungkyunkwan University)	2.456%
113	May 21, 2017	Peter Han (Musician, University of Vienna graduate with major in English Literature)	1.886%
114	May 28, 2017	Nahzam Sue (Singer, producer, audio engineer, member of band Sultan of the Disco)	2.042%
115	June 4, 2017	Sol Bi, Croquiky Brothers	2.441%
116	June 11, 2017	Lee Jung-hyun (Designer at Volvo, graduate of Umeå Institute of Design in Umeå University)	2.078%
117	June 18, 2017	Lee Min-woong (Home shopping host)	2.001%
118	June 25, 2017	Haim Shafir (board game designer), Laboum	1.622%
119	July 2, 2017	John Park, Roy Kim (Liberal arts VS Science team battle)	2.052%
120	July 9, 2017	Kwak Seung-jae (Leader of the South Korea national team for World Puzzle Championship, obtained master's degree in mathematics at Pohang University of Science and Technology)	2.000%
121	July 16, 2017	Lee Yeon-hwa (Creative director, bodybuilder)	2.505%
122	July 23, 2017	Park Ji-sun (Comedian, achieved Bachelor of Education at Korea University College of Education in Korea University), Shin Jae-pyung (standing in for Park Kyung)	3.042%
123	July 30, 2017	Choi Hyun-woo (Magician), Song Young-jo (Doctorate student of Biology & Brain Engineering in KAIST)	3.142%
124	August 6, 2017	Im Young-min, Yu Seon-ho, Lee Eui-woong (Produce 101 Season 2 contestants)	2.687%
125	August 13, 2017	Kang Sung-tae (Online learning lecturer, studied in Seoul National University)	2.655%
126	August 20, 2017	Jasmine Saein Park (Graduated from Stanford University, worked at Microsoft, Seoul International School high honor student, daughter of Insooni)	2.272%
127	August 27, 2017	Kim Jun-heon (National Assembly Speaker Chung Sye-kyun's administrative secretary, Seoul National University's College of Education graduate)	2.325%
128	September 3, 2017	Shin Jae-pyung, Kwak Seung-jae (World Puzzle Championship 2017 national representatives preliminaries Special)	2.731%
129	September 10, 2017	Moon Ga-young	2.455%
130	September 17, 2017	Ahn Jeong-hyun, Kim Da-in (2017 International Mathematical Olympiad South Korea national team representatives, both won gold medals, studied at Seoul Science High School)	3.119%
131	September 24, 2017	Choi Han-jin, Park Jong-geol (Korea University students) Kim Woon-yeon, Lee Chung-hee (Yonsei University students) (Korea University–Yonsei University rivalry Special)	2.954%
132	October 1, 2017	Tony An, Taemin (SHINee), Shin Jae-pyung, Joo Woo-jae (Special voice appearances by Yoo In-young, Han Sun-hwa and Park Bo-ram on episode 132) (Autumn Picnic Special, Hardcore Treasure Hunt)	2.304%
133	October 8, 2017	Tony An, Taemin (SHINee), Shin Jae-pyung, Joo Woo-jae (Special voice appearances by Yoo In-young, Han Sun-hwa and Park Bo-ram on episode 132) (Autumn Picnic Special, Hardcore Treasure Hunt)	1.884%
134	October 15, 2017	Choi Yu-ri (Airline crew manager, worked for Qatar Airways for 5 years, graduate of Sungshin Women's University Department of German Language and Literature), Choi Yu-na (Entrepreneur, 2013 Miss Korea Seoul 2nd runner-up, former reporter, graduate of Sookmyung Women's University Department of Economics), Choi Yu-sol (Model, graduate of Ewha Womans University Department of Korean Language and Literature) (The three are sisters)	3.037%
135	October 22, 2017	Yoon Jung-soo, P.O (Block B) (standing in for Lee Jang-won)	2.909%
136	October 29, 2017	Jang Jin-mo (Chef, crafted all dishes meant for drama Temperature of Love)	2.377%
137	November 5, 2017	Ddotty (YouTuber, graduate of Yonsei University's Yonsei Law School, co-entrepreneur of Sandbox Network, 2017 Korea Cable TV Awards One Man Creator Award winner)	2.208%
138	November 12, 2017	EXID (except Solji)	2.422%
139	November 19, 2017	Lee Jeong-eun (HR consultant working in Paris, awarded master's degrees for administrative, management and economics from international organisations in France, first Korean to be promoted from intern to official staff at OECD)	2.275%
140	November 26, 2017	Park Seong-ho (KAIST Department of Industrial Design top graduate, took part in National Creative Olympiad for 4 consecutive years, Audi Awards 2016 Excellence Award recipient for Best Innovation)	2.112%
141	December 3, 2017	Kim Ji-seok, Ahn Sung-joon (Go players)	2.313%
142	December 10, 2017	Ryan S. Jhun (Record producer, was qualified for Berklee College of Music, New York University Department of Music, Embry–Riddle Aeronautical University, Queens College, City University of New York, Queensborough Community College, John Jay College of Criminal Justice and City University of New York)	2.262%
143	December 17, 2017	Jo Seung-yeon (Humanities writer, graduated from New York University, Sorbonne University and École du Louvre, speaks 7 languages), Claudio Jung/Jung Kyung (Baritone, current Kookmin University professor, speaks 3 languages), Choi Sung-jun (Actor, graduated from Seoul National University, Mensa International member with top 2% IQ in South Korea), Blair Williams (Television personality, graduated from University of Queensland), Kim Rok (Currently the CEO of an advertising company, graduated from Hanyang University, former reporter and announcer), Yoo In-young (Year End Special)	3.229%
144	December 24, 2017		3.245%

=== 2018 ===
List of 2018 episodes (episode 145-187)

Episode #	Broadcast Date	Guest	Ratings (AGB Nielsen Korea)
145	January 7, 2018	Chang Ki-ha (Musician, Seoul National University graduate with bachelor's degree in sociology); Jeon Jae-yoon (ETH Zurich Atmospheric Sciences master's degree student); Jae Gal So-young (ETH Zurich Physics Doctorate student); Kim Bae-jeong (ETH Zurich Chemistry and Applied Science Doctorate student)	2.627%
146	January 14, 2018	Chang Ki-ha (Musician, Seoul National University graduate with bachelor's degree in sociology); Jeon Jae-yoon (ETH Zurich Atmospheric Sciences master's degree student); Jae Gal So-young (ETH Zurich Physics Doctorate student); Kim Bae-jeong (ETH Zurich Chemistry and Applied Science Doctorate student)	1.757%
146	January 14, 2018	Kim So-yeon (Mammut Sports Group's only Korean worker, ski suit designer)	1.757%
147	January 21, 2018	Chang Ki-ha	2.095%
148	January 28, 2018	An Mi-na (Actress, Yonsei University graduate majoring in Philosophy and Psychology); Blair Williams (standing in for Tyler Rasch)	2.166%
149	February 4, 2018	Paul M. Yun (Current El Camino College professor, only Korean ambassador for NASA, admissions officer for Harvard University, obtained master's degree in education from Harvard University, Master's degree in mathematics from University of California, Los Angeles, Bachelor's degree in mathematics from University of California, Berkeley, also SAT, GRE and GMAT Mathematics questions setter)	2.328%
150	February 11, 2018	Lee Seung-jin (White Hat hacker, CEO of a number one security system consulting enterprise in South Korea); Kang Heung-soo (White Hat hacker, developer of V3 (South Korea representative computer vaccine that has acknowledgement from Samsung, Microsoft and more), has an IQ of 156); Jang Joon-ho (White Hat hacker, first 3rd place from Asia in the finals of world hacking competition DEF CON, recipient of the Presidential Award in Talent Medal of Korea, Pohang University of Science and Technology's Information Security research group chairman)	2.931%
151	February 18, 2018	Kwon Hyuk-soo	2.399%
152	February 25, 2018	No guests (3rd Anniversary Special)	1.369%
153	March 4, 2018	Yoon Duk-won (Episode 83 guest); Choi Eo-jin (Episode 89 guest); Chang Ki-ha (Episodes 145-147 guest); Kwak Seung-jae (Episodes 120, 128 guest); Jang Joon-ho (Episode 150 guest); Oh Tae-seok (Episode 100 guest); Choi Sung-jun (Episodes 143-144 guest); Kim Da-in (Episode 130 guest); Han Kyu-beom (Episodes 110-111 guest); Jung Won-ho (Episodes 110-111 guest) (3rd Anniversary Special #2: Hot Brain Game of Thrones Special)	2.273%
154	March 11, 2018	'3rd Anniversary Special #2: Hot Brain Game of Thrones Special Part 2; Special appearance by Momoland	1.923%
155	March 18, 2018	Kim Ji-hoon (Special appearances by Oh My Girl (YooA, Seunghee) through video)	1.357%
156	March 25, 2018	Ji Il-joo (Actor, member of Mensa International, has an IQ of 156, obtained master's degree from College of Arts in Chung-Ang University) (Final episode of Season 1)	2.010%
Season 2
157	May 29, 2018	(Special appearances by baritone Claudio Jung/Jung Kyung and mezzo-soprano Im Jeong-sook)	1.332%
158	June 5, 2018	No guests	2.121%
159	June 12, 2018	No guests	1.310%
160	June 19, 2018	Kim Dae-shik (Current professor in KAIST's Department of Electrical and Electronic Engineering, professor in the Max Planck Society, had undergone postdoctoral course for Brain and Cognitive Sciences in Massachusetts Institute of Technology, researcher at Riken, assistant tutor in University of Minnesota, associate professor in Boston University)	1.447%
161	June 26, 2018	Ji So-yun	1.183%
162	July 3, 2018	Yoo Byung-jae	1.306%
163	July 10, 2018	Lee Si-won (Actress, achieved bachelor's degree in business administration from Seoul National University and master's degree in anthropology from Seoul National University Graduate School)	1.827%
164	July 17, 2018	Hyelim	1.700%
165	July 24, 2018	Jeong Cheol-gyu (Comedian, Kyungnam University graduate majoring in electronic engineering, Mensa member since May 2018, member of Civiq Society, has an IQ of 172); Lee Yoon-sang (Announcer, Mensa member since 2007 with a tested IQ of 164); Kim In-beom (Student from Seoul National University majoring in mechanical engineering, Mensa member); Kim Dong-hyun (Rubik's Cube player, current Korea record setter for solving of 2x2x2 Rubik's Cube, Mensa member) (Mensa Avengers Special)	1.281%
166	July 31, 2018	Lee Gyu-bin (Civil servant starting from May 2019, currently studying at Seoul National University majoring in electrical engineering and minoring in marketing, passed the Financial Administrative Examination Level 5, participant of Heart Signal Season 2)	1.520%
167	August 7, 2018	Choi Hong-woo (13 years old, took part in the 2014 and 2015 Mathematical Kangaroo and obtained 11th place among all contestants, gold medal in the 2018 International Olympiad in Informatics preliminaries, attended the Center for Talented Youth); Hwang Chan-woo (11 years old, youngest to be invited to the Blue House as a member); Oh Jung-hyun and Oh Jung-hoon (10 years old twins, 2017 World Puzzle Championship contestants, Asia Sudoku Championship 2018 team round 1st place); Hong Han-joo (14 years old, mathematics formula genius) (Problematic Men VS Young Geniuses Special)	1.725%
168	August 14, 2018	Choi Tae-seong (History lecturer in EBSi); Han Soo-yeon (National Liberation Day of Korea Special)	1.576%
169	August 21, 2018	Lee Min-hyung (18 years old, current intern at Seoul National University medical research center)	1.630%
170	August 28, 2018	Aron (NU'EST); Cho Joo-hee (ABC News' Seoul bureau chief and reporter)	2.002%
171	September 4, 2018	iKON (Jinhwan, B.I, Donghyuk)	1.240%
172	September 11, 2018	DIA (Huihyeon, Chaeyeon, Somyi)	1.292%
173	September 18, 2018	Lee Eun-gyeol; Kang Sung-joo (Current senior researcher at Korea Astronomy and Space Science Institute, University of Texas at Austin graduate majoring in Physics and Astronomy, completed University of Iowa's Astrophysics doctorate course)	1.939%
174	September 25, 2018	Shin Bong-sun; Park Ji-sun (Comedian, achieved Bachelor of Education at Korea University College of Education in Korea University); Lee Si-won (Actress, achieved bachelor's degree in business administration from Seoul National University and master's degree in anthropology from Seoul National University Graduate School); Park Shin-young (Freelance announcer, former announcer of MBC Sports Plus, achieved Bachelor in Economics at New York University); Go So-hyun (Model, graduated from Ewha Womans University majoring in Computer Science); Hyelim (Chuseok Special: Problematic Women)	1.893%
175	October 2, 2018	Hikaru Suzuki (Currently studying at University of Tokyo's Faculty of Law, was awarded the Hult Prize, acknowledged by Stanford University); Sou Mizukami (Currently studying at University of Tokyo's Faculty of Medicine, top 0.01% in Japan); Hinano Sugimoto (Currently studying at University of Tokyo's School of Science Department of Physics, 1st place in Miss International Japan 2018); Takushi Izawa (Currently studying at University of Tokyo Graduate School studying agricultural economics, director of a questions and answers magazine, from University of Tokyo majoring in economics); Takemata Beni (Japanese professional Shogi player, currently studying at Waseda University's School of Political Science and Economics); Ogi Hitoshi (Graduated from Keio University, member of Non-Summit) (Korea VS Japan Special)	2.842%
176	October 9, 2018		1.909%
177	October 16, 2018	Croquiky Brothers	2.620%
178	October 23, 2018	Kim Jung-hyun (Carrie; 2015 Miss Intercontinental Korea Semi Winner); Lee Sung-in (Ellie; studied in Capital Normal University, current director of CarrieSoft); Hyun Chae-min (Lucy; speaks French, Japanese and English) (The three are part of YouTube channel Carrie TV)	2.161%
179	October 30, 2018	Kim Jin-yeob (Actor, singer, scholarship student from Korea University); Key (Shinee) (standing in for Kim Ji-seok)	1.810%
180	November 6, 2018	Jeon Hyun-moo (Currently studying in Konkuk University majoring in physics); Ha Seok-jin (Currently studying in Sogang University majoring in computer engineering); Park Kyung (Lawyer, graduated from law school 6 years ago); Lee Jang-won (Obtained master's degree in plastic surgery from Yonsei University's Severance Hospital, IQ150); Tyler Maxey (English teacher working in Korea for 1 year, from Texas)	2.091%
181	November 13, 2018	Park Chan-hoo (Currently studying at Pohang University of Science and Technology's Computer Engineering course); Kim Hyun-sung (Currently studying at Pohang University of Science and Technology's Electrical and Electronic Engineering course) (Both are co-founders of media startup Geekble, which was listed in Forbes 30 Under 30 Asia 2018 list, and was awarded the 1st Google Newslab Fellowship scholarship)	1.733%
182	November 20, 2018	Kim Seo-yeon (Miss Korea 2014 winner, graduated from Ewha Womans University majoring in Business Administration, vice-leader of Seoul branch's Global Shaper Community for World Economic Forum); Lee Chae-rin (World Miss University 2017 contestant, currently studying in Korea University majoring in Business Administration); Han Ga-hyeon (2017 Chunhyang Selection Contest's Miss Chunhyang, currently studying in Sogang University for triple major in National Literature, News Media and Education Culture)	2.234%
183	November 27, 2018	Kim Beom-joon (Chief Technology Officer of popular delivery app Delivery's Nation, graduated from KAIST School of Computing); Jang In-seong (Chief Brand Officer of popular delivery app Delivery's Nation)	1.619%
184	December 4, 2018	Kwon Hyuk-gyu (Currently studying in Pohang University of Science and Technology, currently operating a SNS account for assistance in solving mathematics problems); Choi Hyun-joon (Currently studying in KAIST, achieved top 0.2% in Baccalauréat examinations); Kim Yeon-joon (Currently working at Ewha Womans University as a mathematics tutor for undergraduates and postgraduates); Kim Myung-soo (Currently studying in Seoul National University, achieved 1st place in academics among the entire Seoul Science High School); Choi Kyung-don (Currently studying in Ulsan National Institute of Science and Technology)	2.124%
185	December 11, 2018	AIVAN (Singer-songwriter; currently studying at Yonsei University as a scholarship master's degree student, member of Mensa International with IQ 156, formerly an intern reporter of CNN Korea); Sungjoo (UNIQ member, actor; previously studied in China for 3 years); Han Min-se (Singer-songwriter, part of Long:D; graduated from Yonsei University majoring in philosophy); Siyoon (Singer, actor, former member of Paran and U-KISS; studied in Columbia University); Inseong (SF9 member; studied in London for one year); Yoonsan (HOTSHOT member; stayed in France for 8 years, majored in design, was an intern designer at Chanel); Joo Eo-jin (Model); Park Chan-gyu (Model); Hyunuk (IN2IT member); Taro (Hot Blood Youth Member) (Problematic Men Intern Selections Special)	2.145%
186	December 18, 2018	Michael K. Lee (Musical actor, graduate of Stanford University majoring in psychology and medicine); Ham Yon-ji (Musical actress, graduated from Daewon Foreign Language High School, graduate of New York University's Tisch School of the Arts); AIVAN (as Problematic Men Intern)	2.451%
187	December 25, 2018	Lee Si-won (Actress, achieved bachelor's degree in business administration from Seoul National University and master's degree in anthropology from Seoul National University Graduate School); Park Shin-young (Freelance announcer, former announcer of MBC Sports Plus, achieved Bachelor in Economics at New York University); Han Ga-hyeon (2017 Chunhyang Selection Contest's Miss Chunhyang, currently studying in Sogang University for triple major in National Literature, News Media and Education Culture); Stella Jang (Singer-songwriter, graduate of Agro ParisTech, a Grandes école, majoring in Life Engineering); Jeon Sung-cho (Arirang TV newscaster, currently studying at Ewha Womans University's Graduate School of Translation and Interpreting, achieved bachelor's degree in Geography and Environmental Science from Florida State University); Park Yoo-rim (Currently studying in KAIST, former member of all-girl children's group 7 Princess); Inseong (SF9; as Problematic Men Intern) (Christmas Special: Problematic Men VS Problematic Women)	2.221%

=== 2019 ===
List of 2019 episodes (episode 188-217)

Episode #	Broadcast Date	Guest	Ratings (AGB Nielsen Korea)
188	January 1, 2019	WINNER (Lee Seung-hoon, Kang Seung-yoon) (New Year's Special: Escape The Cube)	1.884%
Change in broadcast time to every Monday 23:00 (KST)
189	January 7, 2019	Lee Soo-rin (Year 3 student at University of Cambridge majoring in mechanical engineering); Shin Joon-ha (Year 3 student at University of Cambridge majoring in information engineering); Inseong (SF9; as Problematic Men Intern)	1.958%
190	January 14, 2019	Hwang Je-sung (Comedian, achieved bachelor's degree in performing arts from Sungkyunkwan University); Inseong (SF9; as Problematic Men Intern)	2.315%
191	January 21, 2019	Oumaima Fatih (from Morocco, studied in Seoul National University majoring in construction engineering); Eugina Svetlana (from Russia, currently studying at Sungkyunkwan University majoring in political diplomacy, graduated from an arts school in Russia with full marks in all modules); Daniel Tudor (from England, studied in University of Oxford, former Korea branch president of The Economist, former Blue House overseas speech secretary advisory committee, member of Mensa International with IQ 177 since he was 12); Inseong (SF9; as Problematic Men Intern) (Global Special Part 1)	2.067%
192	January 28, 2019	Min Jin-woong; Inseong (SF9; as Problematic Men Intern)	1.966%
193	February 4, 2019	Kim Chang-jin (Ha Seok-jin's manager); Han Jae-sang (Jun Hyun-moo's manager); Min Byung-hoon (Lee Jang-won's manager); Jeong Hwang-joo (Tyler Rasch's manager); Lee Won-ho (Park Kyung's manager)	1.805%
194	February 11, 2019	Jin Ji-hee	1.489%
195	February 18, 2019	(Global Special Part 2: Problematic Men VS National University of Singapore)	1.775%
196	February 25, 2019	Seol Min-seok (History lecturer); Go So-hyun (Model, graduated from Ewha Womans University majoring in Computer Science)	2.696%
197	March 4, 2019	No guests (Korea VS Japan Revenge Match Part 1: Standby training at Kumamoto, Japan)	1.573%
198	March 11, 2019	Sou Mizukami (Currently studying at University of Tokyo's Faculty of Medicine, top 0.01% in Japan); Takushi Izawa (Currently studying at University of Tokyo Graduate School studying agricultural economics, director of a questions and answers magazine, from University of Tokyo majoring in economics); Takemata Beni (Japanese professional Shogi player, currently studying at Waseda University's School of Political Science and Economics); Shinya Sunagawa (Qualified for University of Tokyo, Waseda University and Keio University at the same period; 2018 Mr University Of Tokyo); Ema Katahara (Currently studying at Keio University majoring in English and American Literature; Self-learnt 5 languages: Japanese, English, Korean, Chinese and Swahili; received the Heather Diary Award at the 2018 Miss Keio) (Korea VS Japan Revenge Match Part 2 at Kumamoto, Japan)	1.338%
199	March 18, 2019	No guests (Kim Ji-seok's Comeback Special: Save Ji-seok from the Cube)	1.433%
200	March 25, 2019	200th Episode Special: 200 VS 6 (Part 1) (Special appearances by Lee Eun-gyeol and Lee Si-won)	2.005%
201	April 1, 2019	200th Episode Special: 200 VS 6 (Part 2) (Special appearances by Croquiky Brothers)	1.762%
202	April 8, 2019	Kim Moon-gi (Seoul National University's School of Dentistry graduate, Class Of 1989; father of Kim Jin-ha and Kim Joon-hwi); Kim Jin-ha (Seoul National University's College of Medicine student, Class of 2016); Kim Joon-hwi (Seoul National University's School of Dentistry student, Class of 2018)	1.755%
203	April 15, 2019	Jun Bum-sun (Singer, songwriter, vocal of rock band Jun Bum-sun and The Yangbans; Dartmouth College alumnus, attained master's degree in history at University of Oxford Graduate Admissions school, formerly an Ivy League admissions coordinator, was qualified for Columbia Law School, University of Cambridge Graduate Admissions school and University of Oxford Graduate Admissions school at the same time)	1.611%
204	April 22, 2019	Park Sung-kwang	1.554%
205	April 29, 2019	IZ*ONE; Blair Williams (standing in for Park Kyung)	1.592%
206	May 6, 2019	Cha Jae-yi (Actress, daughter of Cha Hwa-yeon; had early graduation from New York University's Tisch School of the Arts, scored full marks for mathematics in SAT)	1.529%
207	May 13, 2019	Lee Sa-gang (Film director, graduated from London Film School)	1.148%
208	May 20, 2019	Andy Park (Visual director working for Marvel Studios, comic book artist, illustrator, concept artist)	1.202%
209	May 27, 2019	Kim Jong-min	1.796%
210	June 3, 2019	Ki Dong-hoon (Emergency medicine specialist); Lee Ho-sang (Fire lieutenant for Daejeon Fire Department); Kim Tae-il (Staff of Korea Occupational Safety and Health Agency)	0.848%
211	June 10, 2019	Hwang Chi-yeul; Yoo Byung-jae; Park Shin-young (Freelance announcer, former announcer of MBC Sports Plus, achieved Bachelor in Economics at New York University); Stella Jang (Singer-songwriter, graduate of Agro ParisTech, a Grandes école, majoring in Life Engineering); Hyelim; Inseong (SF9 member; studied in London for one year) (Final episode of Season 2)	1.319%

Season 3
Episode #	Broadcast Date	Location	Teams	Ratings (AGB Nielsen Korea)
212	November 21, 2019	Pohang University of Science and Technology	Team Hyunmoo: Jun Hyun-moo, Lee Jang-won, Ddotty, Oh Yoon-jae (Note: Postgraduate majoring in mathematics, graduated from elite high school with a top ranking, won awards at the university mathematics competition for 3 consecutive years); Team Seokjin: Ha Seok-jin, Kim Ji-seok, Joo Woo-jae, Kim Yoon-hee (Note: Undergraduate majoring in life engineering, was tested to have an IQ of 136 at 5 years old)	2.044%
213	November 28, 2019	Pohang University of Science and Technology	Team Hyunmoo: Jun Hyun-moo, Lee Jang-won, Ddotty, Oh Yoon-jae; Team Seokjin: Ha Seok-jin, Kim Ji-seok, Joo Woo-jae, Kim Yoon-hee	1.945%
214	December 5, 2019	Catholic University of Korea College of Medicine	Team Woojae: Joo Woo-jae, Kim Ji-seok, Lee Jang-won, Lee Seung-hwan (Note: Year 2 undergraduate; obtained full marks for mathematics, English and chemistry in 2016 College Scholastic Ability Test); Team Ddotty: Ddotty, Jun Hyun-moo, Ha Seok-jin, Seo Jung-hwan (Note: Year 1 foundation student; graduated from high school with a top 0.1% ranking, was a winner of the Chemistry Research Frontier Prime Minister Award)	1.863%
215	December 12, 2019	Korean Minjok Leadership Academy	Team Jeong Yakyong: Jun Hyun-moo, Lee Jang-won, Joo Woo-jae, Koo Min-gi (Note: Year 2 student; national representative for the International Linguistics Olympiad); Team Yi Sun-sin: Kim Ji-seok, Ha Seok-jin, Ddotty, Kim Yeon-seo (Note: Year 2 student; administrative head of committee of the school, won various certificates of outstanding accomplishment for debating)	1.964%
216	December 19, 2019	Korean Minjok Leadership Academy	Team Jeong Yakyong: Jun Hyun-moo, Lee Jang-won, Joo Woo-jae, Koo Min-gi; Team Yi Sun-sin: Kim Ji-seok, Ha Seok-jin, Ddotty, Kim Yeon-seo	1.585%
217	December 26, 2019	SK Telecom	Team Arts: Jun Hyun-moo, Kim Ji-seok, Ddotty, Jang Yoo-seong (Note: Mobility Business department team leader (1.5 years); graduated from Seoul National University majoring in mathematics, obtained masters in computer engineering in America, former CEO of a startup company (specialising in autonomous vehicles and AI) at Silicon Valley); Team Science: Lee Jang-won, Ha Seok-jin, Joo Woo-jae, Lee Ji-soo (Note: MNO division Retention Team employee (2 years); former sports announcer)	1.784%

=== 2020 ===
List of 2020 episodes (episode 218-224)

Episode #	Broadcast Date	Location	Teams	Ratings (AGB Nielsen Korea)
218	January 2, 2020	Seoul Land	Team Hyunmoo: Jun Hyun-moo, Kim Ji-seok, Ha Seok-jin, Verbal Jint; Team Jangwon: Lee Jang-won, Joo Woo-jae, Ddotty, Park Sae-byul	1.555%
219	January 9, 2020	Gyeonggi Science High School	Team Hyunmoo: Jun Hyun-moo, Lee Jang-won, Joo Woo-jae, Park Jeong-um (Note: Year 2 student; Won gold award for KPHC and KMChC (physics and chemistry respectively), ranked 1st in school for mathematics and science); Team Followers: Ha Seok-jin, Kim Ji-seok, Ddotty, Hong Seok-joo (Note: Year 1 student; Won the Korean Mathematical Olympiad gold award, ranked 1st in school for mathematics)	1.835%
220	January 16, 2020	Gyeonggi Science High School	Team Hyunmoo: Jun Hyun-moo, Lee Jang-won, Joo Woo-jae, Park Jeong-um; Team Followers: Ha Seok-jin, Kim Ji-seok, Ddotty, Hong Seok-joo	1.825%
221	January 23, 2020	Not Applicable (Note: CSAT Full Marks Scorers Special)	Team OB: Jun Hyun-moo, Kim Ji-seok, Lee Jang-won, Song Young-joon (Note: Obtained full marks for CSAT 2020); Team YB: Ha Seok-jin, Joo Woo-jae, Ddotty, Lee Jin-hyung (Note: Successfully applied for Seoul National University twice, obtained full marks for 2019 CSAT 2019) (Special appearances by AIVAN and Lee Seung-hyo (Note: Student from Korean Minjok Leadership Academy))	1.611%
222	January 30, 2020	Yonsei University	Sinchon Line: Jun Hyun-moo, Joo Woo-jae, Ddotty, Kim Yeon (Note: Year); 81 Line: Kim Ji-seok, Lee Jang-won, Ha Seok-jin, Jung Jin-tae (Note: Year 2 student, majoring in chemical engineering)	1.581%
223	February 6, 2020	Yonsei University	Sinchon Line: Jun Hyun-moo, Joo Woo-jae, Ddotty, Kim Yeon; 81 Line: Kim Ji-seok, Lee Jang-won, Ha Seok-jin, Jung Jin-tae	1.229%
224	February 13, 2020	Sandbox Network (Note: Co-founder of the company is Ddotty)	TBA: Jun Hyun-moo, Kim Ji-seok, Ha Seok-jin, Oh Hyun-min; TBA: Lee Jang-won, Joo Woo-jae, Ddotty, Yoo Byung-jae (Special appearance by Copychu)	1.326%

Note: This program airs on a cable channel/pay TV which normally has a relatively smaller audience compared to free-to-air TV/public broadcasters.

== Awards and nominations ==
Year	Award	Category	Recipient	Result
2016	tvN10 Awards	Best Content Award, Variety	Problematic Men	Won
2016	tvN10 Awards	Best MC	Jun Hyun-moo	Nominated
2016	tvN10 Awards	Two Star Award	Kim Ji-seok	Nominated
