= Rewind (South Korean TV series) =

South Korean television show

- Promotional poster
- Hangul: 리와인드 - 시간을 달리는 게임
- RR: Riwaindeu - siganeul dallineun geim
- MR: Riwaindŭ - siganŭl tallinŭn keim
- Genre: Variety Show
- Presented by: Kim Sung-joo
- Starring: Park Myeong-su; Muzie; Jinsol (April); Kim Jong-kook; Yang Se-chan; Park Kyung (Block B); Haha; Haon; Lee Ji-hye
- Country of origin: South Korea
- Original language: Korean
- No. of seasons: 1
- No. of episodes: 24

Production
- Producer: Lee Soo-ho
- Production location: South Korea
- Running time: 80 minutes

Original release
- Network: Channel A
- Release: July 17, 2019 – January 8, 2020

Rewind (Korean: 리와인드) is a South Korea variety show program that was aired on Channel A and broadcast by Channel A on Wednesdays 9.30pm KST.

== Synopsis ==
This is a new type of game show where the casts goes back in time to answer relevant questions asked by the host based on the specific year. In addition, each group will also get to invest with their Rewind Money and whichever group that earns the most will be the winner.

== Cast ==
=== MC ===
- Kim Sung-joo

=== Present Members ===
- Park Myeong-su
- Muzie
- Kim Jong-kook
- Yang Se-chan
- Haha
- Lee Ji-hye

=== Past members ===
- Park Kyung (Block B) - Ep 1-16
- Haon - Ep 1-16
- Jinsol (April) - Ep 1-16

== Episodes ==
– Team(s) that had won
– Team(s) that had lost

Ep.	Rewind Back to the Year	Team Members			Round	Total Earned (in ₩)			Guests	Summary
Ep.	Rewind Back to the Year	Park Myeong-su's Team	Kim Jong-kook's Team	Haha's Team	Round	Park Myeong-su's Team	Haha's Team	Kim Jong-kook's Team	Guests	Summary
1	1999	Muzie; Jinsol	Yang Se-chan; Park Kyung	Haon; Lee Ji-hye	1 (Note: Earning their 1st capital)	40,000,000	10,000,000	4,000,000	—N/a	In this episode, all the 3 groups will start from 0 Rewind Money and will earn their capital from the game called Rewind Mock Test. The test consists of a total of 5 questions for the 3 groups to answer. All the groups have to answer all the 5 questions within 10 minutes. The Rewind Money earned for each question will be base on the difficulty level of the questions. The more difficult the questions are, the more Rewind Money they get to earn if they answer the questions correctly.
1	1999	Muzie; Jinsol	Yang Se-chan; Park Kyung	Haon; Lee Ji-hye	2 (Note: Making their 1st investment choice)	17,200,000	4,000,000	1,720,000	—N/a	On the 2nd round, the casts get to invest in the few given choices and gain their profits or loss from the investment they have previously chosen to invest.
2	1999	Muzie; Jinsol	Yang Se-chan; Park Kyung	Haon; Lee Ji-hye	3	72,342,680	36,419,000	36,419,000	—N/a	During the 3rd round, all the 3 groups had to guess which groups had the best album sales within October to December 1999 and make their investment on the group. In addition, for this round, Jong-kook's team had to loan money from 'Rewind Bank' due to insufficient money in their bank to make the investment.
2	1999	Muzie; Jinsol	Yang Se-chan; Park Kyung	Haon; Lee Ji-hye	4				—N/a	
2	1999	Muzie; Jinsol	Yang Se-chan; Park Kyung	Haon; Lee Ji-hye	5				—N/a	
2	1999	Muzie; Jinsol	Yang Se-chan; Park Kyung	Haon; Lee Ji-hye	Total	395,020,367	348,438,024	294,356,330	—N/a	
3	2002	Muzie; Jinsol	Yang Se-chan; Park Kyung	Haon; Lee Ji-hye	1				—N/a	
3	2002	Muzie; Jinsol	Yang Se-chan; Park Kyung	Haon; Lee Ji-hye	2				—N/a	
3	2002	Muzie; Jinsol	Yang Se-chan; Park Kyung	Haon; Lee Ji-hye	3				—N/a	
4	2002	Muzie; Jinsol	Yang Se-chan; Park Kyung	Haon; Lee Ji-hye	4				—N/a	
4	2002	Muzie; Jinsol	Yang Se-chan; Park Kyung	Haon; Lee Ji-hye	5				—N/a	
4	2002	Muzie; Jinsol	Yang Se-chan; Park Kyung	Haon; Lee Ji-hye	6				—N/a	
4	2002	Muzie; Jinsol	Yang Se-chan; Park Kyung	Haon; Lee Ji-hye	7				—N/a	
4	2002	Muzie; Jinsol	Yang Se-chan; Park Kyung	Haon; Lee Ji-hye	Total	521,555,800	376,198,800	366,638,536	—N/a	
5	1994	Park Kyung; Muzie	Yang Se-chan; Haon	Jinsol; Lee Ji-hye	1				—N/a	
5	1994	Park Kyung; Muzie	Yang Se-chan; Haon	Jinsol; Lee Ji-hye	2				—N/a	
5	1994	Park Kyung; Muzie	Yang Se-chan; Haon	Jinsol; Lee Ji-hye	3				—N/a	
6	1994	Park Kyung; Muzie	Yang Se-chan; Haon	Jinsol; Lee Ji-hye	4				Chun Myung-hoon; Lee Jin-ho	
6	1994	Park Kyung; Muzie	Yang Se-chan; Haon	Jinsol; Lee Ji-hye	5				Chun Myung-hoon; Lee Jin-ho	
6	1994	Park Kyung; Muzie	Yang Se-chan; Haon	Jinsol; Lee Ji-hye	6				Chun Myung-hoon; Lee Jin-ho	
6	1994	Park Kyung; Muzie	Yang Se-chan; Haon	Jinsol; Lee Ji-hye	Total	63,193,688,531	3,990,610,391	30,441,684,723	Chun Myung-hoon; Lee Jin-ho	
7	2009	Park Kyung; Muzie	Yang Se-chan; Haon	Jinsol; Lee Ji-hye	1				—N/a	
7	2009	Park Kyung; Muzie	Yang Se-chan; Haon	Jinsol; Lee Ji-hye	2				—N/a	
7	2009	Park Kyung; Muzie	Yang Se-chan; Haon	Jinsol; Lee Ji-hye	3				—N/a	
8	2009	Park Kyung; Muzie	Yang Se-chan; Haon	Jinsol; Lee Ji-hye	4				—N/a	
8	2009	Park Kyung; Muzie	Yang Se-chan; Haon	Jinsol; Lee Ji-hye	Total	895,711,100	1,445,827,100	1,036,317,600	—N/a	
9	2018				Total	223,000,000	192,000,000	181,000,000	Oh Ha-young (Apink)	
10	2018				Total	668,337,000	702,548,000	983,540,000	—N/a	
11	2012				Total		256,954,120	11,088,160	—N/a	
12	2005				Total	625,404,500	659,367,000	544,588,300	—N/a	
13	1988				Total	952,700,000	1,902,700,000	1,879,320,000	—N/a	
14	2000				Total	95,313,185	432,747,011	440,813,430	Jo Su-bin	
15	2004				Total	1,54,600,000	3,997,400,000	9,911,300,000	Jo Su-bin	
16	2015				Total	748,700,000	978,590,000	912,400,000	Jo Su-bin	
17	1992								Hyun Jin-young, Sung Dae-hyun, Kim Jung-nam	
18	1998								Hyun Jin-young, Sung Dae-hyun, Kim Jung-nam	
19	2007								Han Ki-bum, Jo Jun-ho, Shin Soo-ji	
20	1996								Hong Kyung-in, Lee Eui-jung, Choi Jae-woo	
21	2001								Chae Yeon, Brian Joo, KCM	
22	2008								Chae Yeon, Brian Joo, KCM	
23	2003								Andy Lee, Shin Ji, Hong Kyung-min	
24	1990								Kim Soo-yong, Hyun Jin-young, Hwang Hye Young, Shin Ji	

== Ratings ==
- Ratings listed below are the individual corner ratings of Rewind. (Note: Individual corner ratings do not include commercial time, which regular ratings include.)
- In the ratings below, the highest rating for the show will be in red and the lowest rating for the show will be in blue each year.

Ep. #	Original Airdate	AGB Nielsen Ratings Nationwide
1	July 17, 2019	0.478%
2	July 24, 2019	0.862%
3	July 31, 2019	0.735%
4	August 7, 2019	0.642%
5	August 14, 2019	0.701%
6	August 21, 2019	0.783%
7	August 28, 2019	0.537%
8	September 4, 2019	0.708%
9	September 11, 2019	0.469%
10	September 18, 2019	0.402%
11	September 25, 2019	0.473%
12	October 2, 2019	0.353%
13	October 9, 2019	0.823%
14	October 16, 2019	0.445%
15	October 23, 2019	0.421%
16	October 30, 2019	0.628%
17	November 20, 2019	0.636%
18	November 27, 2019	0.772%
19	December 4, 2019	0.760%
20	December 11, 2019	0.529%
21	December 18, 2019	0.704%
22	December 26, 2019	0.697%
23	January 1, 2020	0.700%
24	January 8, 2020	0.691%
