= Travelling Market =

Television program

- Promotional Poster
- Genre: Reality; Variety
- Starring: Seo Jang-hoon; Jang Yoon-jeong; Yoo Se-yoon
- Country of origin: South Korea
- Original language: Korean
- No. of seasons: 1
- No. of episodes: 26

Production
- Production location: South Korea
- Running time: 80 minutes

Original release
- Network: JTBC
- Release: February 16 – August 9, 2020

Travelling Market (Korean: 유랑마켓; Hanja: 流浪마켓; lit. Wandering Market) is a South Korean television program hosted by Seo Jang-hoon, Jang Yoon-jeong and Yoo Se-yoon. It aired on JTBC every Sunday at 19:40 (KST), from February 16 to August 9, 2020.

== Overview ==
In each episode, the cast members visit a celebrity's residence (the celebrity labelled as the episode's Client). The Client will introduce his/her residence, their belongings to sell and the memories with these belongings. The cast members each take charge of selling a number of the belongings through Danggeun Market, an online second-hand shopping portal. In some episodes, a special guest will join in at the residence and have the cast members to sell his/her belongings as well, or guest as an Intern Selling Fairy, in which he/she will also compete against the cast members to sell the belongings. When a negotiation with a buyer, who usually is one within the vicinity of the celebrity's home, is successful, the celebrity and the cast member in charge of the item would personally meet the buyer to finish the deal. The cast member with the most number of items sold (or the highest of the amount earned if there's a tie in number of items sold) will be the episode's Selling King. After completion of filming each episode, the production team would sell the unsold items behind the scenes, and their new owners will be shown.

Originally, the unsold items after the first selling phase (which consists of selling on filming day itself, and the production team selling behind the scenes) would still be kept by the celebrity. However, starting from episode 6, viewers all around South Korea can buy the celebrity's belongings that were not sold after the first selling phase through the show's website after each episode was aired. The second selling phase would be on a first come, first served basis.

== Episodes ==
| Ep. | Broadcast Date | Location | Client(s) | Selling King | Remark(s) |
|---|---|---|---|---|---|
| 1 | February 16 | Cheongdam-dong, Gangnam District, Seoul | Moon Jung-won | Yoo Se-yoon | |
| 2 | February 23 | Yeonhui-dong, Seodaemun District, Seoul | Lee Yeon-bok | Jang Yoon-jeong | |
| 3 | March 1 | Songdo, Incheon | Hyoyeon (Girls' Generation) | Seo Jang-hoon | Intern Selling Fairy: Shindong (Super Junior) |
| 4 | March 8 | Samseong-dong, Gangnam District, Seoul | Ddotty | Seo Jang-hoon | |
| 5 | March 15 | Donam-dong, Seongbuk District, Seoul | Kim Soo-yong | Yoo Se-yoon | Special guest: Kim Bo-sung |
| 6 | March 22 | Unyang-dong, Gimpo, Gyeonggi Province | Bbaek Ga (Koyote) | Jang Yoon-jeong | Special guest: Kim Jong-min (Koyote) |
| 7 | March 29 | Bora-dong, Yongin, Gyeonggi-do | Kim Wan-sun | Seo Jang-hoon | |
| 8 | April 5 | Samcheong-dong, Jongno District, Seoul | Mark Tetto | Yoo Se-yoon | Special guest: Alberto Mondi |
| 9 | April 12 | Yeonhui-dong, Seodaemun District, Seoul | Han Suk-joon | Seo Jang-hoon | |
| 10 | April 19 | Nonhyeon-dong, Gangnam District, Seoul | Ha Chun-hwa; Jin Sung; Young Tak; Lee Chan-won; Jang Minho; Kim Hee-jae; Kim Soo-chan | Jang Yoon-jeong (Note: Together with her team members YoungTak and Kim Soo-chan) | Travelling Bazaar Special |
| 11 | April 26 | Nonhyeon-dong, Gangnam District, Seoul | Ha Chun-hwa; Jin Sung; Young Tak; Lee Chan-won; Jang Minho; Kim Hee-jae; Kim Soo-chan | Jang Yoon-jeong | Travelling Bazaar Special |
| 12 | May 3 | Cheoin District, Yongin, Gyeonggi-do | Chae Ri-na | Jang Yoon-jeong | Special guest: Hyun Jin-young |
| 13 | May 10 | Dongjak-dong, Dongjak District, Seoul | Kim Sun-kyung | Jang Yoon-jeong | |
| 14 | May 17 | Bangbae-dong, Seocho District, Seoul | Ko Ji-yong; Ko Seung-jae (Note: Son of Ko Ji-yong) | Jang Yoon-jeong | |
| 15 | May 24 | Pyeongtaek, Gyeonggi-do | Brian (Fly to the Sky) | Yoo Se-yoon | |
| 16 | May 31 | Deokso-ri, Wabu-eup, Namyangju, Gyeonggi-do | Jo Eun-sook | Yoo Se-yoon | |
| 17 | June 7 | Oksu-dong, Seongdong District, Seoul | Kim Sae-rom | Jang Yoon-jeong | Intern Selling Fairy: Dong Ji-hyun |
| 18 | June 14 | Amsa-dong, Gangdong District, Seoul | Hong Sung-heon; Hong Hwa-ri; Hong Hwa-cheol (Note: Son of Hong Sung-heon) | Yoo Se-yoon | |
| 19 | June 21 | Hannam-dong, Yongsan District, Seoul | Shindong (Super Junior) | Choi Yeo-jin | Intern Selling Fairy: Choi Yeo-jin |
| 20 | June 28 | Oksu-dong, Seongdong District, Seoul | Kwak Jung-eun | Yoo Se-yoon | Intern Selling Fairy: Hong Hyun-hee |
| 21 | July 5 | Seocho-dong, Seocho District, Seoul | Lee Hyun-yi | Kim Min-kyung | Intern Selling Fairy: Kim Min-kyung |
| 22 | July 12 | Not mentioned | Kim Sung-eun | Tak Jae-hoon | Intern Selling Fairy: Tak Jae-hoon |
| 23 | July 19 | Cheongdam-dong, Gangnam District, Seoul | Kim Jong-min (Koyote) | Shin Ji | Intern Selling Fairy: Shin Ji (Koyote) |
| 24 | July 26 | Cheongdam-dong, Gangnam District, Seoul | Choi Yeo-jin | Jang Yoon-jeong | Intern Selling Fairy: Heo Kyung-hwan |
| 25 | August 2 | Bangbae-dong, Seocho District, Seoul | Ahn Hyun-mo | Jang Yoon-jeong | Intern Selling Fairy: Han Suk-joon; Special voice appearances by Jang Dong-min, Jun Hyun-moo, Boom and Kim Young-chul through phone |
| 26 | August 9 | Jijeong-myeon, Wonju, Gangwon Province | Jang Dong-min | Seo Jang-hoon | |

== Ratings ==
Average TV viewership ratings
| Ep. | Original broadcast date | Average audience share (Nielsen Korea) |
|---|---|---|
| 1 | February 16, 2020 | 2.539% |
| 2 | February 23, 2020 | 2.217% |
| 3 | March 1, 2020 | 2.149% |
| 4 | March 8, 2020 | 2.190% |
| 5 | March 15, 2020 | 1.860% |
| 6 | March 22, 2020 | 1.873% |
| 7 | March 29, 2020 | 2.510% |
| 8 | April 5, 2020 | 2.704% |
| 9 | April 12, 2020 | 3.041% |
| 10 | April 19, 2020 | 5.443% |
| 11 | April 26, 2020 | 3.538% |
| 12 | May 3, 2020 | 2.463% |
| 13 | May 10, 2020 | 2.657% |
| 14 | May 17, 2020 | 1.724% |
| 15 | May 24, 2020 | 2.702% |
| 16 | May 31, 2020 | 2.284% |
| 17 | June 7, 2020 | 2.083% |
| 18 | June 14, 2020 | 1.806% |
| 19 | June 21, 2020 | 2.487% |
| 20 | June 28, 2020 | 1.617% |
| 21 | July 5, 2020 | 1.685% |
| 22 | July 12, 2020 | 2.679% |
| 23 | July 19, 2020 | 2.657% |
| 24 | July 26, 2020 | 2.257% |
| 25 | August 2, 2020 | 1.602% |
| 26 | August 9, 2020 | 2.096% |
In this table below, the blue numbers represent the lowest ratings and the red numbers represent the highest ratings.
