= Park Kyung =

South Korean rapper and record producer (born 1992)

Park Kyung 박경
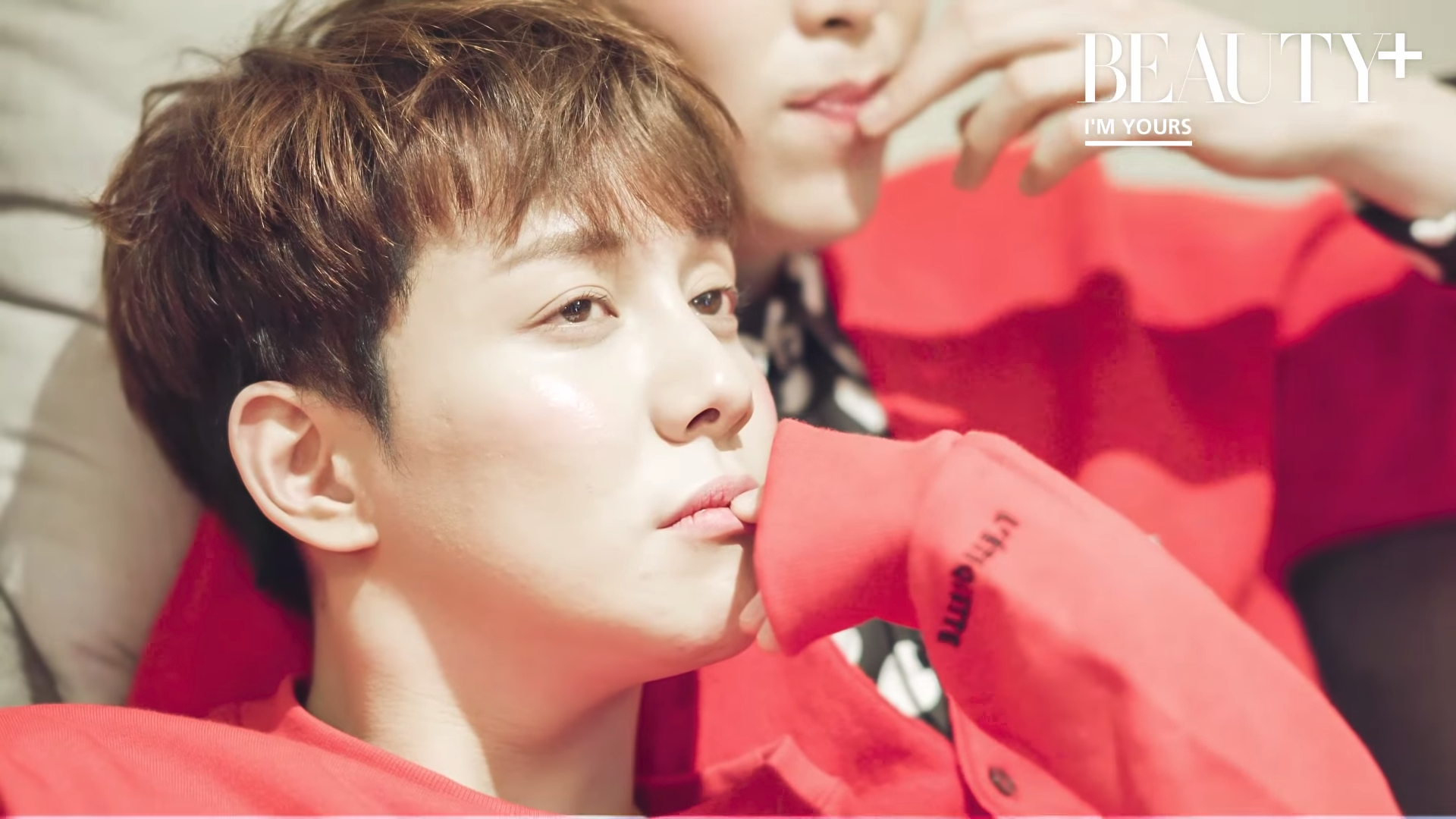
- Park in 2017

Background information
- Born: Park Kyung; July 8, 1992 (age 34); Seoul, South Korea
- Genres: K-pop; hip hop
- Occupations: Rapper; record producer
- Years active: 2011–present
- Label: Seven Seasons
- Member of: Block B

Korean name
- Hangul: 박경
- RR: Bak Gyeong
- MR: Pak Kyŏng

Park Kyung (Korean: 박경; born July 8, 1992), also known as just Kyung, is a South Korean rapper and record producer. He is a member of the group Block B.

== Career ==
=== Pre-debut ===
Park Kyung started his rapping career by promoting underground along with Zico. He used the name Holke, which means Horse-K. Park debuted in 2009 with the digital single "The Letter" as duo with Zico.

=== 2015: Problematic Men and "Ordinary Love" ===
On August 27, 2015, the television variety show Problematic Men announced that Park would join the show as a regular cast member, starting September 6.

A teaser image for Park's solo debut was released on September 9, 2015. His agency Seven Seasons commented, "Park Kyung displayed special affection and passion while writing and composing his solo song. This will be an opportunity for him to grow as an artist." "Ordinary Love" was produced by Korean/American jazz hip-hop producer Kero One alongside Park featuring Park Boram on September 21, 2015. The single topped multiple Korean real-time charts the day of its release and went on to debut at no.1 on Melon as well as no.3 on the Gaon Weekly Digital Chart.

=== 2016: "Inferiority Complex" and "Ogeul Ogeul" ===
On May 18, 2016, at midnight KST, a teaser video was uploaded for Park's upcoming single "Inferiority Complex" feature GFriend's Eunha, with the full video and the song being released seven days later.

In addition to releasing a song together, in May, Park and Eunha starred in the second season of the online show Oh My God! Tip, in which they act out tips for handling difficult situations.

On May 25 at midnight KST, Park released the music video for his single "Inferiority Complex". It's a cute and romantic duet that features GFriend's Eunha, and in the music video the two singers play a couple with a bit of a jealously issue. The video includes fun scenes of them on a home shopping channel and their own version of the live broadcast show My Little Television, and features plenty of cute scenes of the pair. The single was ranked no.1 on a variety of Korean real-time music charts.

In October, Park appeared on the show Celebrity Bromance with fellow Problematic Men cast member Kim Ji-seok.

On December 15, it was announced that Park would be releasing the single "Ogeul Ogeul" four days later. "Ogeul Ogeul" was first released as a mixtape song in 2013; the backing track is by Kero One. The title is a transcription of the Korean expression 오글 오글, which refers to the cringing feeling experienced when one is watching something cheesy.

=== 2017: Notebook and "Yesterday" ===
On January 8, Block B announced that Park would be releasing his first mini-album, Notebook on January 18. The album contained five songs, including three that had been previously released as singles.

Park composed the song "Yesterday", which was released by Block B on February 6, 2017, as a digital single "Yesterday". The song achieved an "all kill", topping six of Korea's real-time music charts.

He also produced the song, "Love or Not", which was released by fellow Block B member Taeil on June 12. The song featured Kim Se-jeong of Gugudan and was nominated for a 2017 Melon Music Awards Hot Trend Award. Two weeks later, "The Night Sky", a song from the drama The Best Shot was released; Park performed on and co-wrote the song.

On July 31, the MBC television network announced that Park would appear in a new variety show, Mystery Rank Show 1, 2, 3, which began broadcast August 4. The next day, Park released the digital single "Wiped" as part of an endorsement campaign. During the Chuseok holiday, Park appeared as a host for the annual international public diplomacy show Quiz on Korea, along with Leeteuk.

=== 2018: "Don't Leave" and "Instant" ===
On January 8, 2018, Block B released the album Re: Montage with a lead single, "Don't Leave", written and produced by Park.

In June 2018, Park announced a new single, "Instant", which was released June 22 and featured the singer Sumin. The song is in the alternative funk style, with lyrics about how modern technology has affected human relationships.

In early July 2018, it was announced that Park was producing the upcoming single by the group The Boyz, expected to be released later in the month.

=== 2019: "28.3°C" ===
On February 18, 2019, it was announced that Park would hold a solo fan meeting, titled "28.3°C," on March 9 and March 10 in Seoul. Tickets to the meeting sold out February 25.

In April 2019, it was announced that Taeil and Park would hold two concerts in Seoul together on May 25 and 26.

On November 24, 2019, Park published a tweet, which was later deleted, accusing six acts of engaging in "sajaegi," or chart manipulation, in which an artist buys or streams their own music in bulk in order to place higher on the music charts. The artists all denied manipulating the charts and announced their intentions to file legal actions against Park for defamation. The publicity surrounding the incident led several industry insiders to publicly state that sajaegi was increasingly impacting Korea's digital charts.

On December 7 and 8, 2019, Park held a solo fan meeting, "28.12°C," in Seoul.

=== 2020–present: Military service ===
In September 2020, Park Kyung received a fine of approximately $4,000 for defamation as a result of his tweet accusing other artists of chart manipulation.

On October 14, it was announced that Park Kyung would begin the military service required of South Korean men on October 19, serving for approximately a year and a half. The start of his service had been delayed because of the legal actions against him.

In April 2022, it was announced that Park Kyung, who had originally been scheduled to be discharged that month, had for health reasons switched from military service to public service, delaying his discharge.

== Personal life ==
He is a member of Mensa International.

=== Controversy ===
On September 20, 2020, an anonymous person who attended middle school with Park wrote a post on Instagram accusing him of committing school violence, specifically towards students with special needs.

The production team behind JTBC's Knowing Bros shared that they decided not to air the October 10 episode with Park Kyung following the bullying controversy. On October 15, a Korean YouTuber released a recording of an executive from the agency of one of the artists Park had accused of chart manipulation saying that he was responsible for discovering and publicizing the bullying allegations.

== Discography ==
=== Extended plays ===
Title	Album details	Peak chart positions	Sales
Title	Album details	KOR	Sales
Notebook	Released: January 18, 2017; Label: Seven Seasons, CJ E&M; Formats: CD, digital download; Track listing: 1. Ordinary Love (보통연애) (feat. Park Boram); 2. When I'm With You (너 앞에서 나는) (feat. Brother Su); 3. Ogeul Ogeul (오글오글); 4. Inferiority Complex (자격지심) (feat. Eunha of GFriend); 5. Memories (장상) (feat. Yoon Hyun-sang)	5	KOR: 9,248

=== Singles ===
Title	Year	Peak positions	Sales	Albums
Title	Year	KOR	Sales	Albums
"Ordinary Love" (보통연애) (feat. Park Boram)	2015	3	KOR: 930,149	Notebook
"Inferiority Complex" (자격지심) (feat. Eunha of GFriend)	2016	3	KOR: 888,848	Notebook
"Ogeul Ogeul" (오글오글)	2016	20	KOR: 110,325	Notebook
"When I'm With You" (너 앞에서 나는) (feat. Brother Su)	2017	36	KOR: 67,512	Notebook
"Memories" (잔상) (feat. Yoon Hyun-sang)	2017	87	KOR: 24,528	Notebook
"Wiped"	2017	98	KOR: 26,672	Space Oddity Project Vol. 1
"Instant" (feat. Sumin)	2018	—	**	Non-album single
"Gwichanist"	2019	—	**	Non-album single
"To Love Only Once" (사랑을 한 번 할 수 있다면) (feat. J Rabbit)	2019	124	**	Non-album single
"Refresh" (feat. Kang Min-kyung of Davichi)	2020	95	**	Non-album single
"—" denotes releases that did not chart. ** Gaon stopped releasing download sales numbers in January 2018.

=== Soundtrack appearances ===
Title	Year	Peak chart position	Album
Title	Year	KOR	Album
"The Night Sky" (밤하늘)	2017	—	Hit the Top OST
"Lucid Dream"	2019	—	Guilty Secret OST
"Goin' Crazy" (feat. Ravi)	2019	—	Melody Bookstore OST
"Ddingdong" (띵동)	2020	—	Welcome OST
"See Saw" (feat. SeolA of Cosmic Girls)	2020	—N/a	Backstreet Rookie OST
"—" denotes releases that did not chart or were not released in that region.

== Filmography ==
=== Drama ===
Year	Title	Role	Notes
2016	Oh My God! Tip	Himself	Web Drama

=== Variety show ===
Year	Title	Network	Notes
2012–2013	1 vs. 100	KBS	the 100 mob members, with Zico
2015–2019	Problematic Men	tvN	Cast member
2016	Celebrity Bromance	Naver TVCast	with Kim Ji-seok
2017	Ranking Show 1, 2, 3	MBC	Panelist
2017	Quiz on Korea	KBS	MC, with Leeteuk
2018	King of Mask Singer	MBC	Contestant
2018	1 vs. 100	KBS	The One (winner)
2019	Help Me! Homes	MBC	Cast member
2019	Rewind	Channel A	Team member
2019	Melody Bookstore	JTBC	Cast member
2020	Oh! My Part, You	MBC	Panelist

=== Radio shows ===
Date	Name	Network
2019	Dreaming Radio	MBC FM4U

=== Music videos ===
Year	Title	Album	Director
2015	보통연애 (Ordinary Love)	Notebook	Tiger Cave
2016	자격지심 (Inferiority Complex)	Notebook	Vikings League
2017	너 앞에서 나는 (When I'm With You)	Notebook	Digipedi
2017	Wiped	—N/a	FantazyLab
2018	INSTANT	—N/a	Tiger Cave
2019	Gwichanist	—N/a	Unknown
2019	사랑을 한 번 할 수 있다면 (To Love Only Once)	To Love Only Once	Unknown

== Awards and nominations ==
Year	Award/Critics	Category	Nominated Work	Result
2015
2015	25th Seoul Music Awards	Bonsang Award	"Ordinary Love" (feat. Park Boram)	Nominated
2015	25th Seoul Music Awards	Popularity Award	"Ordinary Love" (feat. Park Boram)	Nominated
2016	Melon Music Awards	Rap/Hip Hop	"Inferiority Complex" (feat. Eunha of GFriend)	Nominated
2016	Mnet Asian Music Awards	Best Collaboration	"Inferiority Complex" (feat. Eunha of GFriend)	Nominated
2016	Mnet Asian Music Awards	HotelsCombined Song of the Year	"Inferiority Complex" (feat. Eunha of GFriend)	Nominated
2017	31st Golden Disk Awards	Digital Daesang	"Inferiority Complex" (feat. Eunha of GFriend)	Nominated
