= 2020 Korean YouTube backdoor advertising controversy =

Undisclosed advertising by Korean YouTubers

In 2020, it was discovered that Korean YouTubers and internet celebrities were engaging in undisclosed or "backdoor" advertising, involving the promotion of products without the disclosure of a paid partnership with the suppliers of these products. This discovery led to widespread controversy and the eventual involvement of the South Korean Fair Trade Commission, which imposed strict regulations on social media providers in a major crackdown. The incident also prompted calls for similar regulation in other countries, such as the United States and Japan.

== Beginning of the controversy ==
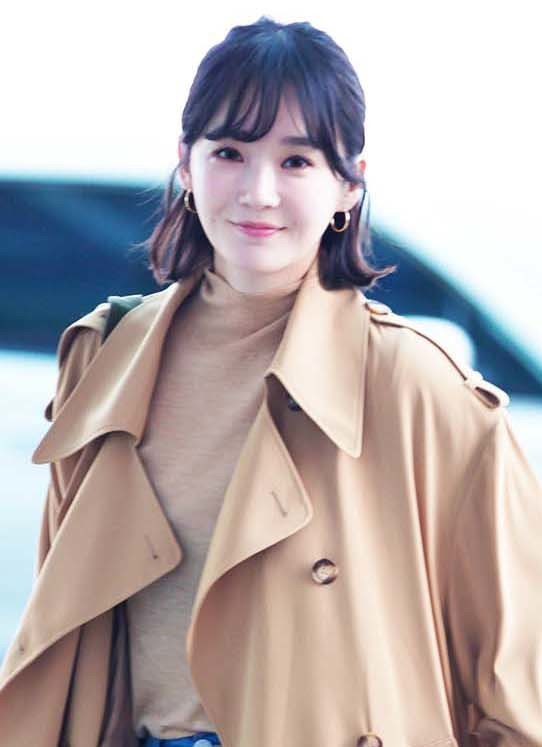
Kang Min-kyung at Incheon International Airport

On 15 July 2020, Dispatch, a Korean media organisation, reported that prominent Korean internet celebrities such as Han Hea-youn and Kang Min-kyung were involved in the process of undisclosed or 'backdoor' advertising, where products were promoted without the disclosure of a paid partnership. Kang Min-kyung was revealed to have been promoting products worth tens of thousands of dollars in videos without revealing that these videos were sponsored. Both figures later publicly apologised for their actions following major controversy.

Subsequently, other prominent figures such as YouTuber CharmPD (참피디) also revealed their involvement in this practice. The latter would also publicly reveal that several other prominent Korean YouTubers were similarly involved, which served to greatly increase the scale of the controversy.

== Impact on YouTubers ==
YouTubers such as mukbang food reviewers Tzuyang, Embro (엠브로), Moon Bok-hee (문복희), and Hamji (햄지) publicly apologised for their actions by admitting to their use of undisclosed advertising. However, this failed to improve public opinion, and led to significant losses in popularity among those involved, with one YouTuber losing 96% of their viewership in a month. Some YouTubers stopped uploading videos altogether, and announced their retirement from YouTube as a result of the controversy.

== Legal regulation ==
The growing scale of the controversy led to the official involvement of the South Korean Fair Trade Commission (FTC). On August 24 2020, Chairman of the FTC Cho Seong-wook met with prominent individuals and internet celebrities at the Chamber of Commerce and Industry in the Jung District of Seoul, which resulted in the implementation of strict regulations on social media platforms (including YouTube) in order to crack down on the practice of 'backdoor' advertising. These regulations did not immediately come into effect, but were instead enforced after a certain period of time, in order to allow affected individuals time to comply.

The regulations required internet celebrities to clearly disclose instances of advertising and paid sponsorships as well as associated payments, and prohibited ambiguous phrases such as 'experience group' and 'thanks to'. Contravention of these regulations would be met by significant legal and financial penalties, including up to two years in prison and fines of up to 150 million won. Although these laws were typically applied to business owners, internet celebrities were considered as such and were therefore subject to the same treatment under South Korean law.

== Impact on other countries ==
The strict response by the South Korean FTC prompted calls for similar measures abroad, with the Federal Trade Commission of the United States issuing a statement in February 2021 calling for the implementation of similar regulations. Legislative bodies in Japan and France passed similar measures, with offenders in France facing penalties of up to two years in prison and fines of up to 300,000 euros.
