= Kero One =

Korean-American rapper, producer and DJ

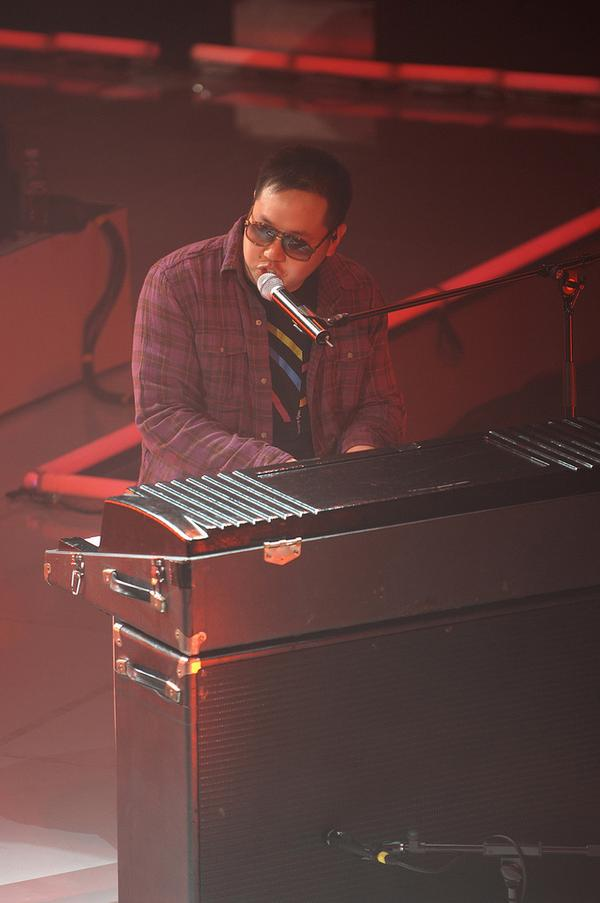
- Kero One playing Fender Rhodes at a concert in 2009

Background information
- Also known as: Kero Uno
- Origin: San Francisco, California
- Genres: Hip hop; jazz rap; neo soul; electro; R&B
- Occupations: Rapper; composer/producer; DJ
- Instruments: Vocals; keyboard; bass guitar; drums
- Years active: 2002–present
- Labels: Plug Label; P-Vine; M.net
- Website: www.kero1.com

Kero One is a Korean-American hip hop MC, producer, and DJ from San Francisco, California. He has been recognized for re-introducing the jazz rap sound in the early to mid 2000s with his jazz-hop album Windmills of the Soul.

== History ==
Kero One originally worked as a web designer, making 50 copies of his first single with home equipment and personal credit cards. He released his first 12" record, Check the Blueprints in 2003 on his own imprint, Plug Label. Of the 50 copies that were eventually distributed around the world, one reached a tiny record store in Tokyo, Japan. A few weeks later, it was found by a Japanese DJ who played it at a club that night and received dozens of inquiries, including a Japanese label executive who immediately contacted Kero One and asked for 3,000 copies of the record.

In 2012, Kero one released his fourth solo album, Color Theory, which raised over $10k from fans to pay for the mastering and engineering costs through Kickstarter. His lead single "What Am I Supposed to Do" charted on Radio Nova (France), J*Wave Japan, and WDR Funkhaus europa radio in Germany. The song received a major endorsement from Stevie Wonder, who asked Kero One to perform it at Wonder's 17th Annual House Full of Toys Benefit Concert on December 15, 2012, at Nokia Live Theatre with Bruno Mars.

Later, Kero One formed a new collaboration project, Kesna Music with YouTube singer Esna Yoon. They released their single "Is It Love?" on July 16, 2013.

In 2015, Kero One brought his signature jazz-hop sound to Korea, producing a song called "Ordinary Love" for Korean rapper Park Kyung of Block B and Park Bo-Ram, which hit #1 on Melon charts. Later that year, Kero One released a future soul album under the alias "Kero Uno", called Reflection (noitcelfer) Eternal which made it to Reddit's ListenToThis best of 2015 albums list. Also in 2016, South Korean longboarder Hyo Joo Ko used Kero One's 2012 song "So Seductive" in one of her Instagram videos. When Kero One reposted the video on his Facebook page it went viral, reaching 26 million views. The viral video brought Hyo Joo Ko international fame and renewed interest in Kero One's older song.

== Highlights ==
- 5th Best Indie hiphop of 2004 on MSN music
- 4th Most Downloaded artist on Cnet's Download.com
- 2nd selling underground hiphop album on HMV and Tower Records Japan
- 2nd most downloaded album on iTunes Japan
- Landed on Reddit's ListenToThis best of 2015 albums list

== Discography ==
=== Albums ===
Year	Title	Label
2006	Windmills of the Soul	Plug Label
2006	Windmills of the Soul Instrumentals	Plug Label
2008	Kero One Presents..Plug Label	Plug Label
2009	Early Believers	Plug Label
2010	Kinetic World	Plug Label
2012	Color Theory	Plug Label
2015	Reflection Eternal	Plug Label
2017	Kero & Azure	Plug Label

=== Singles ===
Year	Title	Label
2018	"A New Day Dawns"	Plug Label
2017	"Let Me Show You"	Plug Label
2015	"Princess Diamond" featuring Kelsey Bulkin	Plug Label
2012	"What Am I Supposed to Do?" featuring Suhn	Plug Label
2010	"When the Sunshine Comes" featuring Ben Westbeech	Plug Label
2008	"Get Down" featuring Aloe Blacc	Plug Label
2006	"In All the Wrong Places/ Give Thanks" (Sound Providers Remix)	Plug Label
2005	"My Story"	Plug Label
2005	"Keep It Alive"	Plug Label
2003	"Check the Blueprints"	Plug Label

=== Collaborative works ===
Year	Title	Label
2017	"Bad Habits" Crazyboy of J-Soul Brothers	Avex Japan
2016	"Ogeul Ogeul" featuring Park Kyung of (Block B)	Seven Seasons
2015	"Ordinary Love" featuring Park Kyung (Block B) and Park Bo-ram	Seven Seasons
2013	Kesna Music - Is It Love?	Plug Label
2012	Kero One - Love's Gonna Getcha (feat. Dynamic Duo & DFD)	Plug Label
2012	Kero One - Love's Gonna Getcha TV Instrumental (feat. Gaeko of Dynamic Duo)	Plug Label
2012	Sam Ock - Pieces (feat. Kero One)	SAM OCK
2010	Anan Ryoko - Forever We Will Be (feat. Kero One)	Blues Interactions, Inc.
2009	Kero One - When the Sunshine Comes (feat. Epik High)	Plug Label
2009	Kero One - Let's Just Be Friends (feat. Dynamic Duo)	Plug Label
2009	Kero One - Keep Pushin' (feat. Tablo of Epik High)	Plug Label
2009	Kero One - Goodbye Forever (Choice 37 Remix) (feat. Ben Westbeech & Choice 37)	Plug Label
2009	Epik High - Rocksteady (feat. Kero One, Dumbfoundead, MYK, Rakka)	Map The Soul Inc.
2009	Epik High - Map The Soul [Worldwide Version] (feat. MYK, Kero One)	Map The Soul Inc.
2008	Talib Kweli - "In the Pocket" (Kero One Remix)	Manhattan Records/HMV
2008	Nomak feat. Abstract Rude - "Hi, Mom! - A Prayer For World Peace" (Kero One Remix)	Huge Soul
2008	Pe2ny - "Wake Up" (feat. Kero One, Myk)	Mnet Korea
2008	Rashaan Ahmad - "Here We Go" (prod. by Kero One)	Om hiphop
2008	DJ Motive - "Reach for the Star" (feat. by Kero One)	Mohowks Records
2007	Dynamic Duo - 지구본뮤직 (feat. Kero One)	CJ Music
2007	Lanu - "It's Time" (feat. Kero One)	Tru Thoughts/Ubiquity Records
2007	Choice 37 - "Conversate" (feat. Kero One & El Gambina)	Subcontact Records
2007	Himuki - Innervision (feat. Kero One)	S.O.U.Records/Milkdipper/Nunki Inc.
2006	Surreal & DJ Balance - Yeah Boy (Beat By Kero One)(feat. Theory Hazit)	Hiphop IS Music
