= Korea University College of Education =

College of Korea University in Seoul, South Korea

Coordinates: 37.5915°N 127.0343°E

College of Education
- 고려대학교 사범대학 (高麗大學校 師範大學)
- Type: Private
- Established: 1972
- Location: Seoul, South Korea
- Website: educa.korea.ac.kr

The College of Education is one of the undergraduate colleges at Korea University in Seoul, South Korea. It is considered to be one of the leading schools of education in the country.

Launched in 1972, the College of Education hosts 2,000 would-be-teachers in nine departments. It is a place in which top-tier professors and their students can grow together through teaching and learning. The students can acquire expertise in two professional areas by choosing from multiple, dual, and intensified majors. In addition, the college encourages the development of advanced educational and research activities by collaborating with university institutes that are linked with the departments. The college also operates the Graduate School of Education.

== Departments ==
English Language Education

Korean Language Education

Math Education

Geology Education

History Education

Physical Education

Home Economics Education

Department of Education
