= Windmills of the Soul =

Studio album by Kero One
- Released: February 7, 2006
- Recorded: 2002–2005; Sticks Studios (San Jose, California)
- Genre: Hip hop; jazz rap
- Length: 46:14
- Label: Plug Label
- Producer: Kero One, King Most

Kero One chronology
Windmills of the Soul (2006)	Kero presents plug label (2008)

Singles from Windmills of the Soul
- 1. "Check The Blueprints" Released: February 2003; 2. "Keep it Alive!" Released: 2006; 3. "In all the Wrong Places" Released: February 2007

Windmills of the Soul is the debut album by the Korean-American hip-hop artist Kero One, released on February 7, 2006, on Plug Label.

== Music ==
A jazz/hip-hop album that infused dusty drums with plenty of live instrumentation. Windmills of the Soul was produced using the Asr-10 and Mpc-2000.

== Reception ==
XLR8R magazine called it lyrically compelling. Oozing dusty drum breaks, mellow loops, and live instrumentation aplenty-Fender Rhodes, sax, and guitar are all present.

== Track listing ==
All tracks written and produced by Kero One except track 5 & 9 by King Most.

Track #	Title
1	Windmills Intro
2	Give Thanks ft. Niamaj
3	Musical Journey
4	My Story
5	In a Dream
6	Ain't That Somethin?
7	Tempted
8	In all the Wrong Places
9	Keep it Alive!
10	The Cycle Repeats
11	Fly Fly Away
12	It's a New Day
13	Check the Blueprints

== Personnel ==
Credits for Windmills of the Soul adapted from Discogs.

- Kero one – producer, mixing
- Niamaj – rap
- Vince Czekusk –guitar, fender rhodes
- King Most – associate producer
- Eddy Schreyer – engineer
- Seoul Control – turntables
- Danny Song – photography
- Kento Tanaka – design, cover art concept

== Singles ==
Single information
"Check The Blueprints"
- Released: 2003
- B-side: "The Cycle Repeats"
